= List of radio stations in Alberta =

The following is a list of radio stations in the Canadian province of Alberta, as of August 2024.

== Radio stations ==
Call sign	Frequency	City of licence	Owner	Format
CFIT-FM	106.1 FM	Airdrie	Golden West Broadcasting	Adult Top 40
VF2241	89.9 FM	Anzac	Aboriginal Multimedia Society	First Nations
CKBA-FM	94.1 FM	Athabasca	Stingray Digital	classic hits
CKUA-FM-10	98.3 FM	Athabasca	CKUA Radio Network	public broadcasting
CKRY-FM-2	93.3 FM	Banff	Corus Entertainment	country
CJAQ-FM-1	94.1 FM	Banff	Rogers Media	adult hits
CJAY-FM-1	95.1 FM	Banff	Bell Media Radio	active rock
CBRB-FM	96.3 FM	Banff	CBC Radio One	public news/talk
CHFM-FM-1	99.3 FM	Banff	Rogers Media	adult contemporary
CFGQ-FM-2	100.1 FM	Banff	Corus Entertainment	classic rock
CKUA-FM-14	104.3 FM	Banff	CKUA Radio Network	public broadcasting
CHMN-FM-1	106.5 FM	Banff	Rogers Media	adult contemporary
VF2242	89.9 FM	Beaver Lake	Aboriginal Multimedia Society	First Nations
CJPR-FM	94.9 FM	Blairmore	Stingray Digital	country
CBX-FM-1	92.9 FM	Bonnyville	CBC Radio One	public news/talk
CHFB-FM	98.7 FM	Bonnyville	Ici Radio-Canada Première	public news/talk (French) (Soon to be CHFA-FM-14)
CFNA-FM	99.7 FM	Bonnyville	912038 Alberta Ltd.	active rock
CJEG-FM	101.3 FM	Bonnyville	Stingray Digital	CHR
VF2176	89.9 FM	Boyer River	Aboriginal Multimedia Society	First Nations
CIXF-FM	101.1 FM	Brooks	Stingray Digital	classic hits
CIBQ-FM	105.7 FM	Brooks	Stingray Digital	country
CIAM-FM-2	95.5 FM	Buffalo Head	CARE Radio Broadcasting Association	Christian radio
VF2244	89.9 FM	Buffalo Lake	Aboriginal Multimedia Society	First Nations
CIAM-FM-24	101.9 FM	Burnt Hill	CARE Radio Broadcasting Association	Christian radio
VF2177	89.9 FM	Bushe River	Aboriginal Multimedia Society	First Nations
VF2084	89.9 FM	Cadotte Lake	Aboriginal Multimedia Society	First Nations
CFFR	660 AM	Calgary	Rogers Media	news
CJLI	700 AM	Calgary	Touch Canada Broadcasting	Christian radio
CHQR	770 AM	Calgary	Corus Entertainment	news/talk
CFAC	960 AM	Calgary	Rogers Media	sports
CBR	1010 AM	Calgary	CBC Radio One	public news/talk
CJWE-FM	88.1 FM	Calgary	Aboriginal Multi-Media Society	First Nations
CJSI-FM	88.9 FM	Calgary	Touch Canada Broadcasting	Christian radio
CBCX-FM	89.7 FM	Calgary	Ici Musique	public music (French)
CKMP-FM	90.3 FM	Calgary	Stingray Digital	rhythmic contemporary
CJSW-FM	90.9 FM	Calgary	Independent	campus radio
CJAY-FM	92.1 FM	Calgary	Bell Media Radio	active rock
CFEX-FM	92.9 FM	Calgary	Harvard Broadcasting	modern rock
CKUA-FM-1	93.7 FM	Calgary	CKUA Radio Network	public broadcasting
CHKF-FM	94.7 FM	Calgary	Fairchild Media Group	multilingual
CKWD-FM	95.3 FM	Calgary	Pattison Media	country
CHFM-FM	95.9 FM	Calgary	Rogers Media	adult contemporary
CJAQ-FM	96.9 FM	Calgary	Rogers Media	adult hits
CHUP-FM	97.7 FM	Calgary	Rawlco Radio	adult hits
CIBK-FM	98.5 FM	Calgary	Bell Media Radio	rhythmic top 40
CBR-1-FM	99.1 FM	Calgary	CBC Radio One	public news/talk
CKCE-FM	101.5 FM	Calgary	Jim Pattison Group	hot adult contemporary
CBR-FM	102.1 FM	Calgary	CBC Music	public music
CFXL-FM	103.1 FM	Calgary	Stingray Digital	classic hits/oldies
CBRF-FM	103.9 FM	Calgary	Ici Radio-Canada Première	public news/talk (French)
CKRY-FM	105.1 FM	Calgary	Corus Entertainment	country
CKYR-FM	106.7 FM	Calgary	Multicultural Broadcasting Corporation	multilingual
CFGQ-FM	107.3 FM	Calgary	Corus Entertainment	news/talk
CIRI-FM	107.9 FM	Calgary	City of Calgary	traffic information
CFCW	840 AM	Camrose	Stingray Digital	country
CFCW-FM	98.1 FM	Camrose	Stingray Digital	classic hits
CHMN-FM	106.5 FM	Canmore	Rogers Media	adult contemporary
CKCA-FM	89.9 FM	Chateh	Dene Tha Communications Society	First Nations community radio
CIAM-FM-17	96.9 FM	Chateh	CARE Radio Broadcasting Association	Christian radio
CBXA-FM	103.5 FM	Chateh	CBC Radio One	public news/talk
VF2179	89.9 FM	Child Lake	Aboriginal Multimedia Society	First Nations community radio
CIAM-FM-12	91.5 FM	Cleardale	CARE Radio Broadcasting Association	Christian radio
VF2481	94.9 FM	Coal Valley Mine Site	Luscar Ltd.	
VF2482	95.9 FM	Coal Valley Mine Site	Luscar Ltd.	
CFIT-FM-1	95.3 FM	Cochrane	Golden West Broadcasting	adult contemporary
CJXK-FM	95.3 FM	Cold Lake	Stingray Digital	classic rock
CBR-2-FM	102.3 FM	Coleman	CBC Radio One	public news/talk
VF2085	89.9 FM	Conklin	Aboriginal Multimedia Society	First Nations community radio
CIDV-FM	90.3 FM	Drayton Valley	Word of Life Center Church and Ministries	Christian radio
CIBW-FM	92.9 FM	Drayton Valley	Jim Pattison Group	country
CKDQ-FM	92.5 FM	Drumheller	Stingray Digital	country
CKUA-FM-13	91.3 FM	Drumheller	CKUA Radio Network	public broadcasting
CHTR-FM	94.5 FM	Drumheller	Drumheller Regional Business Development	tourist information
CHOO-FM	99.5 FM	Drumheller	Golden West Broadcasting	adult contemporary
VF2243	89.9 FM	Duncan's	Aboriginal Multimedia Society	First Nations community radio
CHAH	580 AM	Edmonton	1811258 Alberta Ltd.	multilingual
CBX	740 AM	Edmonton	CBC Radio One	public news/talk
CHED	880 AM	Edmonton	Corus Entertainment	news
CJCA	930 AM	Edmonton	Touch Canada Broadcasting	Christian radio
CJSR-FM	88.5 FM	Edmonton	First Alberta Campus Radio Association	campus radio
CFWE-FM	89.3 FM	Edmonton	Aboriginal Multi-Media Society	First Nations
CHFA-FM	90.1 FM	Edmonton	Ici Radio-Canada Première	public news/talk (French)
CBX-FM	90.9 FM	Edmonton	CBC Music	public music
CHBN-FM	91.7 FM	Edmonton	Rogers Media	CHR
CKNG-FM	92.5 FM	Edmonton	Corus Entertainment	adult hits
CBX-FM-2	93.9 FM	Edmonton	CBC Radio One	public news/talk
CKUA-FM	94.9 FM	Edmonton	CKUA Radio Network	public broadcasting
CKEA-FM	95.7 FM	Edmonton	Harvard Broadcasting	classic rock
CKRA-FM	96.3 FM	Edmonton	Stingray Digital	soft adult contemporary
CIRK-FM	97.3 FM	Edmonton	Stingray Digital	classic rock
CFED-FM	97.9 FM	Edmonton	Société de la radio communautaire du Grand Edmonton	francophone community radio
CIUP-FM	99.3 FM	Edmonton	Pattison Media	adult hits
CFBR-FM	100.3 FM	Edmonton	Bell Media Radio	active rock
CBCX-FM-1	101.1 FM	Edmonton	Ici Musique	public music (French)
CKER-FM	101.7 FM	Edmonton	Akash Broadcasting Inc.	multilingual
CKNO-FM	102.3 FM	Edmonton	Pattison Media	hot adult contemporary
CHDI-FM	102.9 FM	Edmonton	Rogers Media	modern rock
CISN-FM	103.9 FM	Edmonton	Corus Entertainment	country
CFMG-FM	104.9 FM	Edmonton	Bell Media Radio	CHR
CJRY-FM	105.9 FM	Edmonton	Touch Canada Broadcasting	Christian radio
CJNW-FM	107.1 FM	Edmonton	Harvard Broadcasting	rhythmic adult contemporary
CBXD	95.3 FM	Edson	CBC Radio One	public news/talk (French)
CFXE-FM	94.3 FM	Edson	Stingray Digital	country
CKUA-FM-8	103.7 FM	Edson	CKUA Radio Network	public broadcasting
CBRE-FM	100.7 FM	Exshaw	CBC Radio One	public news/talk
CBRI-FM	92.1 FM	Etzikom	CBC Radio One	public news/talk
CKYL-3-FM	88.5 FM	Fairview	Peace River Broadcasting	country
CKKF-FM	106.9 FM	Fairview	Terrance Babiy	hot adult contemporary
CKRP-FM	95.7 FM	Falher	Association canadienne-française de l'Alberta	community radio (French)
CHFA-FM-7	103.7 FM	Falher	Ici Radio-Canada Première	public news/talk (French)
CIAM-FM-4	104.3 FM	Foggy Mountain	CARE Radio Broadcasting Association	Christian radio
VF2087	89.9 FM	Fort Chipewyan	Aboriginal Multimedia Society	First Nations community radio
CIAM-FM-15	95.5 FM	Fort Chipewyan	CARE Radio Broadcasting Association	Christian radio
CBQZ-FM	99.9 FM	Fort Chipewyan	CBC Radio One	public news/talk
VF2182	89.9 FM	Fort McKay	Aboriginal Multimedia Society	First Nations community radio
CIYU-FM	106.3 FM	Fort McKay	Fort McKay Radio Society	First Nations community radio
CKOS-FM	91.1 FM	Fort McMurray	King's Kids Promotions Outreach Ministries	Christian radio
CJOK-FM	93.3 FM	Fort McMurray	Rogers Media	country
CFWE-FM-5	94.5 FM	Fort McMurray	Aboriginal Multi-Media Society	First Nations
CKUA-FM-11	96.7 FM	Fort McMurray	CKUA Radio Network	public broadcasting
CKYX-FM	97.9 FM	Fort McMurray	Rogers Media	active rock
CBXN-FM	99.3 FM	Fort McMurray	CBC Radio One	public news/talk
CHFT-FM	100.5 FM	Fort McMurray	Harvard Broadcasting	classic hits
CHFA-FM-6	101.5 FM	Fort McMurray	Ici Radio-Canada Première	public news/talk (French)
CFVR-FM	103.7 FM	Fort McMurray	Harvard Broadcasting	CHR
CKFT-FM	107.9 FM	Fort Saskatchewan	Kenner Media	Classic hits
CIAM-FM	92.7 FM	Fort Vermilion	CARE Radio Broadcasting Association	Christian radio
VF2509	98.3 FM	Fort Vermilion	Friends of the Falcons	First Nations community radio
CBXF-FM	105.1 FM	Fort Vermilion	CBC Radio One	public news/talk
CBXV-FM	91.3 FM	Fox Creek	CBC Radio One	public news/talk
CBXK-FM	96.9 FM	Fox Lake	CBC Radio One	public news/talk
VF2183	89.9 FM	Goodfish Lake	Aboriginal Multimedia Society	First Nations community radio
CBXC-FM	92.3 FM	Grande Cache	CBC Radio One	public news/talk
CFXG	93.3 FM	Grande Cache	Stingray Digital	country
CHFA-FM-5	103.3 FM	Grande Prairie	Ici Radio-Canada Première	public news/talk (French)
CJXX-FM	93.1 FM	Grande Prairie	Pattison Media	country
CJGY-FM	96.3 FM	Grande Prairie	Golden West Broadcasting	Christian radio
CFGP-FM	97.7 FM	Grande Prairie	Rogers Media	active rock
CIKT-FM	98.9 FM	Grande Prairie	Bear Creek Broadcasting	classic rock
CKUA-FM-4	100.9 FM	Grande Prairie	CKUA Radio Network	public broadcasting
CBXP-FM	102.5 FM	Grande Prairie	CBC Radio One	public news/talk
CFRI-FM	104.7 FM	Grande Prairie	Vista Broadcast Group	CHR
CBRC-FM	97.9 FM	Harvie Heights	CBC Radio One	public news/talk
VF2251	89.9 FM	Heart Lake	Aboriginal Multimedia Society	First Nations community radio
CBXL-FM	99.5 FM	High Level	CBC Radio One	public news/talk
CKHL-FM	102.1 FM	High Level	Peace River Broadcasting	country
CFKX-FM	106.1 FM	High Level	Terrance Babiy	hot adult contemporary
CKVH-FM	93.5 FM	High Prairie	Stingray Digital	classic hits
CKYL-2-FM	92.1 FM	High Prairie	Peace River Broadcasting	country
CJHP-FM	106.9 FM	High Prairie	Terrance Babiy	hot adult contemporary
CHRB	1140 AM	High River	Golden West Broadcasting	news/sports/community radio
CFXO-FM	99.7 FM	High River	Golden West Broadcasting	country
CKUV-FM	100.9 FM	Okotoks	Golden West Broadcasting	Hot Adult Contemporary
CIAM-FM-6	94.7 FM	Hines Creek	CARE Radio Broadcasting Association	Christian radio
CBXI-FM	88.1 FM	Hinton	CBC Radio One	public news/talk
CFXH-FM	97.5 FM	Hinton	Stingray Digital	country
CHFA-FM-4	100.7 FM	Hinton	Ici Radio-Canada Première	public news/talk (French)
CKUA-FM-7	102.5 FM	Hinton	CKUA Radio Network	public broadcasting
CFHI-FM	104.9 FM	Hinton	Stingray Digital	classic hits
VF2252	89.9 FM	Horse Lake	Aboriginal Multimedia Society	First Nations community radio
VF2178	89.9 FM	Janvier	Aboriginal Multimedia Society	First Nations community radio
CJAG-FM	92.3 FM	Jasper	Athabasca Hotel	active rock
CFXP-FM	95.5 FM	Jasper	Stingray Digital	country
CBXJ-FM	98.1 FM	Jasper	CBC Radio One	public news/talk
VF2667	94.7 FM	Jasper National Park	Jasper National Park	tourist/park information
VF2668	96.7 FM	Jasper National Park	Jasper National Park	tourist/park information
VF2090	89.9 FM	John D'Or Prairie	Aboriginal Multimedia Society	First Nations community radio
CBXH-FM	102.5 FM	John D'Or Prairie	CBC Radio One	public news/talk
CFWE-FM-1	91.7 FM	Joussard	Aboriginal Multimedia Society	First Nations community radio
VF2254	89.9 FM	Kikino	Aboriginal Multimedia Society	First Nations community radio
CKLA-FM	92.1 FM	La Crete	Peace River Broadcasting	country
CFWE-FM	89.9 FM	Lac La Biche	Aboriginal Multimedia Society	First Nations community radio
CHPL-FM	92.1 FM	Lac La Biche	Le Club de la radio communautaire de Plamondon-Lac La Biche	community radio (French)
CILB-FM	103.5 FM	Lac La Biche	Stingray Digital	classic hits
CJUV-FM	94.1 FM	Lacombe	Golden West Broadcasting	classic hits
CJAQ-FM-2	93.9 FM	Lake Louise	Rogers Media	adult hits
CJAY-FM-2	97.5 FM	Lake Louise	Bell Media Radio	active rock
CBRQ-FM	103.9 FM	Lake Louise	CBC Radio One	public news/talk
CJLD-FM	93.1 FM	Leduc	Mark Tamagi (OBCI)	country
CKXU-FM	88.3 FM	Lethbridge	CKXU Radio Society	campus radio
CBBC-FM	91.7 FM	Lethbridge	CBC Music	public music
CJBZ-FM	93.3 FM	Lethbridge	Pattison Media	hot adult contemporary
CJOC-FM	94.1 FM	Lethbridge	Clear Sky Radio	adult standards
CHLB-FM	95.5 FM	Lethbridge	Pattison Media	country
CKBD-FM	98.1 FM	Lethbridge	Clear Sky Radio	modern rock
CKUA-FM-2	99.3 FM	Lethbridge	CKUA Radio Network	public broadcasting
CBRL-FM	100.1 FM	Lethbridge	CBC Radio One	public news/talk
CHFA-FM-1	104.3 FM	Lethbridge	Ici Radio-Canada Première	public news/talk (French)
CJRX-FM	106.7 FM	Lethbridge	Rogers Media	active rock
CFRV-FM	107.7 FM	Lethbridge	Rogers Media	adult contemporary
VF2091	90.5 FM	Little Buffalo	Aboriginal Multimedia Society	First Nations community radio
CKSA-FM	95.9 FM	Lloydminster	Stingray Digital	country
CKUA-FM-15	97.5 FM	Lloydminster	CKUA Radio Network	public broadcasting
CILR-FM	98.9 FM	Lloydminster	Stingray Digital	tourist information/community radio
CKLM-FM	106.1 FM	Lloydminster	912038 Alberta Ltd.	active rock
VF2092	89.9 FM	Loon Lake	Aboriginal Multimedia Society	First Nations community radio
CFOG-FM	90.1 FM	Luscar	Floyd Atkinson	country (rep. CISN-FM Edmonton)
VF2213	96.5 FM	Luscar	Floyd Atkinson	classic rock (rep. CFMI-FM Vancouver)
VF2214	106.3 FM	Luscar	Floyd Atkinson	classic rock (rep. CIRK-FM Edmonton)
CKKX-FM-1	92.1 FM	Manning	Terrance Babiy	hot adult contemporary
CKYL-6-FM	93.3 FM	Manning	Peace River Broadcasting	country
CIAM-FM-18	95.5 FM	Manning	CARE Radio Broadcasting Association	Christian radio
CBXM-FM	100.5 FM	Manning	CBC Radio One	public news/talk
CFMR-FM	89.9 FM	Meander River	Dene Tha Communications Society	First Nations community radio
CIAM-FM-16	95.9 FM	Meander River	CARE Radio Broadcasting Association	Christian radio
CJLT-FM	93.7 FM	Medicine Hat	Vista Radio Ltd	Christian radio
CHAT-FM	94.5 FM	Medicine Hat	Pattison Media	country
CFMY-FM	96.1 FM	Medicine Hat	Pattison Media	hot adult contemporary
CKUA-FM-3	97.3 FM	Medicine Hat	CKUA Radio Network	public broadcasting
CBRM-FM	98.3 FM	Medicine Hat	CBC Radio One	public news/talk
CHFA-FM-8	100.5 FM	Medicine Hat	Ici Radio-Canada Première	public news/talk (French)
CJCY-FM	102.1 FM	Medicine Hat	Rogers Media	adult hits
CKMH-FM	105.3 FM	Medicine Hat	Rogers Media	active rock
CBRA-FM	90.9 FM	Milk River	CBC Radio One	public news/talk
CFWE-FM-3	96.7 FM	Moose Hills	Aboriginal Multimedia Society	First Nations
CFIR-FM	88.5 FM	Morley	Terry Rider	
CKRP-FM-1	102.9 FM	Nampa	Association canadienne-française de l'Alberta	community radio (French)
CHBW-FM-1	93.9 FM	Nordegg	Jim Pattison Group	country
CKLJ-FM	96.5 FM	Olds	CAB-K Broadcasting Ltd.	country
CKJX-FM	104.5 FM	Olds	CAB-K Broadcasting Ltd.	active rock
VF2187	89.9 FM	Paddle Prairie	Aboriginal Multimedia Society	First Nations community radio
CKRP-FM-2	90.3 FM	Peace River	Association canadienne-française de l'Alberta	community radio (French)
CHFA-FM-3	92.5 FM	Peace River	Ici Radio-Canada Première	public news/talk (French)
CBXG-FM	93.9 FM	Peace River	CBC Radio One	public news/talk
CKYL-FM	94.9 FM	Peace River	Peace River Broadcasting	country
CKUA-FM-5	96.9 FM	Peace River	CKUA Radio Network	public broadcasting
CFGP-FM-1	104.3 FM	Peace River	Rogers Media	hot adult contemporary
CKKX-FM	106.1 FM	Peace River	Terrance Babiy	hot adult contemporary
VF2188	89.9 FM	Peavine	Aboriginal Multimedia Society	First Nations community radio
VF2255	89.9 FM	Peerless Lake	Aboriginal Multimedia Society	First Nations community radio
CIAM-FM-13	96.9 FM	Peerless Lake	CARE Radio Broadcasting Association	Christian radio
CFWE-FM-2	89.9 FM	Peigan Reserve	Aboriginal Multimedia Society	First Nations community radio
CJPR-FM-1	92.7 FM	Pincher Creek	Stingray Digital	country
CBRP-FM	97.5 FM	Pincher Creek	CBC Radio One	public news/talk
CKPA-FM	89.7 FM	Ponoka	Blackgold Broadcasting	country
VF2293	92.3 FM	Rainbow Lake	Rainbow Lake Sporting Association	
CJRA-FM	93.1 FM	Rainbow Lake	Peace River Broadcasting	country
CBXX	101.5 FM	Rainbow Lake	CBC Radio One	public news/talk
VF2294	103.9 FM	Rainbow Lake	Rainbow Lake Sporting Association	
CKTC-FM	89.9 FM	Red Deer	Red Deer Visitor & Convention Bureau	tourist information
CKRD-FM	90.5 FM	Red Deer	Touch Canada Broadcasting	Christian radio
CKGY-FM	95.5 FM	Red Deer	Stingray Digital	country
CIZZ-FM	98.9 FM	Red Deer	Stingray Digital	active rock
CBR-FM-1	99.9 FM	Red Deer	CBC Music	public music
CKRI-FM	100.7 FM	Red Deer	Harvard Broadcasting	Classic Hits
CKIK-FM	101.3 FM	Red Deer	Harvard Broadcasting	CHR
CBRD-FM	102.5 FM	Red Deer	CBC Radio One	public news/talk
CHFA-FM-2	103.5 FM	Red Deer	Ici Radio-Canada Première	public news/talk (French)
CHUB-FM	105.5 FM	Red Deer	Pattison Media	hot adult contemporary
CFDV-FM	106.7 FM	Red Deer	Pattison Media	classic rock
CKUA-FM-6	107.7 FM	Red Deer	CKUA Radio Network	public broadcasting
CIAM-FM-1	102.9 FM	Red Earth	CARE Radio Broadcasting Association	Christian radio
CHBW-FM	94.5 FM	Rocky Mountain House	Pattison Media	country
CKYL-5-FM	88.9 FM	Saddle Hills County	Peace River Broadcasting	country
VF2256	89.9 FM	Sandy Lake	Aboriginal Multimedia Society	First Nations community radio
CIAM-FM-25	89.3 FM	Saskatoon Hill	CARE Radio Broadcasting Association	Christian radio
CHDH-FM	97.7 FM	Siksika	Siksika Communications Society	First Nations community radio
VF2190	88.7 FM	Slave Lake	Aboriginal Multimedia Society	First Nations community radio
CHSL-FM	92.7 FM	Slave Lake	Stingray Digital	classic rock
CIAM-FM-7	107.5 FM	Slave Lake	CARE Radio Broadcasting Association	Christian radio
CKUA-FM-12	99.5 FM	Spirit River	CKUA Radio Network	public broadcasting
CFWE-FM-4	98.5 FM	Spruce Grove	Aboriginal Multimedia Society	First Nations
CHSP-FM	97.7 FM	St. Paul	Stingray Digital	country
CHFA-FM-9	105.5 FM	St. Paul	Ici Radio-Canada Première	public news/talk (French)
CKSQ-FM	93.3 FM	Stettler	Stingray Digital	country
CKSS-FM	88.1 FM	Stony Plain	Blackgold Broadcasting	country
CKMR-FM	104.5 FM	Strathmore	Clear Sky Radio	country
VF2192	89.9 FM	Sturgeon Lake	Aboriginal Multimedia Society	First Nations community radio
CBXS-FM	91.5 FM	Swan Hills	CBC Radio One	public news/talk
CKBF-FM	104.1 FM	Suffield	CFB Suffield	community radio
VF2398	91.3 FM	Sundre	Rick Martin Trucking	
CIAM-FM-23	102.5 FM	Taber	CARE Radio Broadcasting Association	Christian radio
VF2186	89.9 FM	Tall Cree North	Aboriginal Multimedia Society	First Nations community radio
VF2191	89.9 FM	Tall Cree South	Aboriginal Multimedia Society	First Nations community radio
CJOK-FM-1	95.7 FM	Tar Island	Rogers Media	country
VF2257	89.9 FM	Trout Lake	Aboriginal Multimedia Society	First Nations community radio
CKYL-4-FM	88.7 FM	Valleyview	Peace River Broadcasting	country
CKVG-FM	106.5 FM	Vegreville	CAB-K Broadcasting Ltd.	country
VF2180	89.9 FM	Wabasca	Aboriginal Multimedia Society	First Nations community radio
CIAM-FM-14	95.5 FM	Wabasca	CARE Radio Broadcasting Association	Christian radio
CHSL-FM-1	94.3 FM	Wabasca	Stingray Digital	classic rock
CKWY-FM	93.7 FM	Wainwright	Stingray Digital	adult contemporary
CKKY-FM	101.9 FM	Wainwright	Stingray Digital	active rock
CBPI-FM-1	88.3 FM	Waterton Lakes National Park	CBC/Parks Canada	park information (English)
CBPJ-FM-1	90.7 FM	Waterton Lakes National Park	CBC/Parks Canada	park information (French)
CBPJ-FM	89.5 FM	Waterton Park	CBC/Parks Canada	park information (French)
CBPI-FM	90.3 FM	Waterton Park	CBC/Parks Canada	park information (English)
CIAM-FM-3	94.1 FM	Watt Mountain	CARE Radio Broadcasting Association	Christian radio
CIAM-FM-5	101.7 FM	Weberville	CARE Radio Broadcasting Association	Christian radio
CKWB-FM	97.9 FM	Westlock	Stingray Digital	country
CKJR	1440 AM	Wetaskiwin	Stingray Digital	sports radio
CIHS-FM	93.5 FM	Wetaskiwin	Tag Broadcasting	Christian radio
VF2258	89.9 FM	White Fish Lake	Aboriginal Multimedia Society	First Nations community radio
CFXW-FM	96.7 FM	Whitecourt	Stingray Digital	classic hits
CIXM-FM	105.3 FM	Whitecourt	Edward & Remi Tardif	country
CKUA-FM-9	107.1 FM	Whitecourt	CKUA Radio Network	public broadcasting

== See also ==
- Lists of radio stations in North and Central America
