= Media in Grande Prairie =

This is a list of media in Grande Prairie, Alberta.

== Radio ==
Frequency	Call sign	Branding	Format	Owner	Notes
FM 88.9	CKYL-FM-5	River Country 94.9 FM	country	Peace River Broadcasting	licensed to Saddle Hills County; relays CKYL Peace River
FM 90.5	CHFA-5-FM	Ici Radio-Canada Première	news/talk	Canadian Broadcasting Corporation	French; relays CHFA-FM Edmonton
FM 93.1	CJXX-FM	Big Country 93.1	country	Jim Pattison Group	
FM 96.3	CJGY-FM	96.3 SUN FM	Contemporary Hit Radio	Vista Broadcast Group	
FM 97.7	CFGP-FM	97.7 Rock	active rock	Rogers Media	
FM 98.9	CIKT-FM	98.9 Rewind Radio	adult hits	Jim Pattison Group	
FM 100.9	CKUA-FM-4	CKUA Radio Network	public broadcasting	CKUA Radio Foundation	province-wide public radio network; relays CKUA Edmonton
FM 102.5	CBXP-FM	CBC Radio One	news/talk	Canadian Broadcasting Corporation	relays CBX Edmonton
FM 104.7	CFRI-FM	104.7 The GOAT	Rock	Vista Broadcast Group	

== Television ==
CFRN-TV-1 channel 13 (CTV) is a local repeater of CFRN-DT Edmonton, with separate commercials and local news bulletins (with a local news gathering bureau) for Grande Prairie.

CBXT-DT (CBC Television), CBXFT-DT (Ici Radio-Canada Télé) and CITV-DT (Global) are also available on cable and satellite.

== Print ==
Grande Prairie's main and only daily newspaper is the Grande Prairie Daily Herald-Tribune. The paper also publishes a regional agricultural supplement, The Peace Country Sun. The DHT is owned by Canadian media conglomerate Sun Media, which is owned by Postmedia.

The Herald-Tribune publishes five days a week, Monday through Friday, and offers local news, sports and commentary, as well as national and international news.

The newspaper, which was formed in 1913, became a daily newspaper in 1964, when the name of the paper became the "Daily" Herald-Tribune. It has not missed a scheduled publication, barring holidays, since it became a daily newspaper.

== Other ==
Grande Prairie was host to one of the few video game development studios in Alberta, HermitWorks Entertainment. HermitWorks Entertainment was founded in 2004 and has gone on to release one title, Space Trader.
