= Media in Lethbridge =

This is a list of media outlets in the city of Lethbridge, Alberta, Canada.

== Radio ==
Frequency	Call letters	Branding	Format	Owner	Notes
88.3 FM	CKXU-FM	CKXU 88.3 FM	campus radio	CKXU Radio Society	
91.7 FM	CBBC-FM	CBC Music	public music	Canadian Broadcasting Corporation	Repeater of CBR-FM Calgary
93.3 FM	CJBZ-FM	B93	contemporary hit radio	Jim Pattison Group	
94.1 FM	CJOC-FM	94.1 CJOC	classic hits	Vista Radio	
95.5 FM	CHLB-FM	Wild 95.5	country music	Jim Pattison Group	
98.1 FM	CKBD-FM	98.1 The Ranch	country music	Vista Radio	
99.3 FM	CKUA-FM-2	CKUA	public radio	CKUA Radio Foundation	Repeater of CKUA Edmonton
100.1 FM	CBRL-FM	CBC Radio One	news/talk	Canadian Broadcasting Corporation	Repeater of CBR Calgary
103.5 FM	CJWE-1-FM	CFWE Alberta's Best Country	country music	Aboriginal Multi-Media Society of Alberta	Repeater of CJWE-FM Calgary
104.3 FM	CHFA-1-FM	Ici Radio-Canada Première	news/talk	Canadian Broadcasting Corporation	French, repeater of CHFA Edmonton
106.7 FM	CJRX-FM	106.7 Rock	active rock	Rogers Media	
107.7 FM	CFRV-FM	KiSS 107.7	adult contemporary	Rogers Media	

== Television ==
OTA virtual channel (PSIP)	OTA actual channel	Shaw Cable	Call sign	Network	Notes
2.1	46 (UHF)	8	CKAL-DT-1	Citytv	Rebroadcaster of CKAL-DT (Calgary)
7.1	7 (VHF)	5	CISA-DT	Global	
13.1	13 (VHF)	3	CFCN-DT-5	CTV	Rebroadcaster of CFCN-DT (Calgary)
17.1	17 (UHF)	4	CJIL-DT	Independent	Bridge City News/Miracle Channel
–	–	9	–	Shaw TV	Community channel for Shaw Cable subscribers.

Lethbridge previously received CBC Television from a rebroadcaster of CBRT-DT in Calgary, and Ici Radio-Canada Télé from a rebroadcaster of CBXFT-DT in Edmonton. However, these repeaters went off the air on August 31, 2012 due to budget cuts. Most Lethbridge residents didn't lose access to CBC or Radio-Canada programming, however, as they are still carried on cable.

The incumbent cable television provider in Lethbridge is Shaw Cable. Network programming from the United States is received on cable via affiliates from Spokane, Washington, which is in the Pacific Time Zone. This means American prime time shows on weekdays run from 9PM–12 midnight. Also, except for PBS, HDTV network programming is from Seattle. On digital cable, U.S. network programming (in standard resolution) is available from Detroit in the Eastern Time Zone. Prime time shows on weekdays run from 6PM-9PM.

== Newspapers ==
- Lethbridge Herald - daily paper, owned by Glacier Ventures International Corp. and Alta Newspaper Group Limited Partnership

== See also ==
- List of Calgary media outlets
