= Selkirk Communications =

Defunct Canadian media company

- Industry: Broadcasting
- Predecessor: Taylor, Pearson & Carson, All-Canada Radio Facilities, Ltd
- Founded: 1959; 67 years ago
- Defunct: 1989
- Fate: TV properties sold to WIC; Most radio properties sold to Rogers Communications; Cable holdings and one radio station retained by Maclean-Hunter
- Owner: Maclean-Hunter (from 1988)

Selkirk Communications was a Canadian radio and television broadcasting company, which operated from 1959 to 1989. It evolved out of Taylor, Pearson & Carson, a local broadcaster in Vancouver founded in 1934, and its subsidiary All-Canada Radio Facilities, a national radio syndication service, the company grew to own 14 radio stations, six television stations (three wholly owned and three partially owned) and cable television holdings across Canada and the world.

Selkirk was eventually acquired by Maclean-Hunter in 1988. When the sale was finalized the following year, Maclean-Hunter sold almost all of the company's broadcast properties to WIC and Rogers Communications, retaining ownership only of Selkirk's cable holdings and one radio station. Maclean-Hunter was itself acquired by Rogers in 1994.

== Holdings as of 1988 sale ==
=== Radio ===
Maclean-Hunter sold all of the Western Canadian stations to Rogers Communications, retaining ownership only of CFNY in Toronto.

- Banff/Canmore - CFHC
- Blairmore - CJPR
- Calgary - CFAC
- Edmonton - CJCA, CJCA-FM
- Grande Prairie - CFGP
- Lethbridge - CJOC, CILA
- Squamish/Whistler - CISQ
- Toronto - CFNY
- Vancouver - CKWX, CKKS
- Vernon - CJIB
- Victoria - CJVI

=== Television ===
All of Selkirk's television stations were sold to Western International Communications by Maclean-Hunter.

City	Station	Current status
Calgary/Lethbridge	CFAC-TV/CFAC-1	Global O&Os
Hamilton	CHCH	Independent station owned by Channel Zero (2190015 Ontario Inc.)
Kelowna	CHBC (co-owner with WIC)	Global O&O
Vancouver	CHAN (co-owner with WIC)	Global O&O
Victoria	CHEK (co-owner with WIC)	Independent station owned by CHEK Media Group (0859291 BC Ltd.)
