= All-Canada Radio =

Canadian broadcasting representation and program distribution company

All-Canada Radio Facilities
- Type: Private
- Industry: Broadcasting
- Founded: 1936 in Winnipeg, Manitoba, Canada
- Founder: Dawson Richardson
- Defunct: December 31, 1992
- Fate: Radio operations merged with United Broadcast Sales
- Successor: Canadian Broadcast Sales
- Headquarters: Toronto, Ontario, Canada
- Key people: Harold R. Carson; J. Stuart MacKay
- Services: Broadcast advertising representation; radio program syndication

All-Canada Radio Facilities Ltd., commonly known as All-Canada Radio, was a Canadian broadcast advertising representation and program syndication company. Founded in Winnipeg in 1936 by Dawson Richardson, the company represented privately owned Canadian radio stations to national advertisers and distributed recorded radio programs to stations across Canada. It became Canada's largest broadcast representation firm, measured by both the number of stations represented and advertising billings.

All-Canada expanded into television representation in 1953 and was renamed All-Canada Radio & Television Ltd. in 1957. It later became part of Selkirk Communications. Following Selkirk's acquisition by Maclean-Hunter in 1989, All-Canada was sold to Rogers Broadcasting. Its television representation division was sold in 1991, and its remaining radio representation business was merged with United Broadcast Sales at the end of 1992 to form Canadian Broadcast Sales.

== History ==
=== Origins ===
The development of All-Canada was connected with the growth of privately owned commercial radio in Western Canada. Harold R. Carson, Hugh Pearson and James Taylor formed Taylor, Pearson & Carson in 1934 to provide radio station management, programming and sales services. Carson, Pearson and Eric Harvie also established United Broadcast Sales in Calgary to obtain national advertising for their radio stations, with Perc Gaynor sent to establish a Toronto office.

In 1936, Winnipeg publisher and broadcaster Dawson Richardson established All-Canada Radio Facilities in Winnipeg. Later that year, United Broadcast Sales merged with All-Canada, with the resulting company owned by Richardson, Carson, Harvie and Pearson. Richardson had been involved in broadcasting through CJGX in Yorkton, Saskatchewan.

All-Canada subsequently expanded its national operations. By 1938 it maintained offices in Montreal, Toronto, Winnipeg, Calgary and Vancouver, and became the country's largest broadcast representation firm in both the number of stations represented and advertising billings.

In 1940, Richardson sold his interest in the company to James Richardson & Sons, which was unrelated to him. That company subsequently sold the interest to Armadale Corporation, controlled by the Sifton family.

=== Station representation ===
All-Canada's principal business was acting as the national advertising representative for local radio stations. It sold commercial time on behalf of its client stations to national advertisers and advertising agencies, allowing local broadcasters to obtain advertising originating outside their home markets.

In January 1938, the company introduced an exclusive representation arrangement under which participating stations used All-Canada as their exclusive national sales representative. A 1948 advertisement marking the arrangement's tenth anniversary stated that All-Canada then represented 30 stations, 21 of which had been represented continuously since the system was introduced.

=== Program syndication ===
All-Canada entered syndicated program sales in 1937, distributing recorded programs on electrical transcription discs. The following year, the company established a program division to acquire rights to recorded programming for distribution to Canadian stations. Harold Carson travelled to New York and Hollywood to obtain Canadian and, in some cases, international distribution rights to American radio programs.

Programs handled by All-Canada included The Lone Ranger, programs featuring Guy Lombardo, The Ronald Colman Theatre, and Eb and Zeb. By 1940, All-Canada's program division had what the company's history describes as the largest library of transcribed radio programming in the world.

The transcription business allowed local stations to broadcast professionally produced programs without originating them locally or receiving them simultaneously over a conventional radio network. The company's program-distribution activities later expanded into film distribution for television stations.

All-Canada also distributed short-form news and opinion commentaries. By 1960, it syndicated recorded commentaries by Pierre Berton and Charles Templeton to 30 subscribing radio stations. Stations received 20 segments per week from each commentator, generally running between 40 and 75 seconds and dealing with current affairs, editorials and other topical subjects. Templeton later recalled that All-Canada had hired him in 1958 to produce one-minute news commentaries and that Berton was providing a similar service. Berton and Templeton later teamed up for the daily radio program Dialogue, in which they exchanged personal viewpoints on current events. The program began on CFRB on March 16, 1966, and moved to CKEY on September 7, 1970. The program subsequently continued on CKEY for more than a decade.

=== All-Canada Mutually Operated Stations ===
In 1937, Taylor, Pearson & Carson established All-Canada Mutually Operated Stations (ACMO), a station-management organization closely associated with All-Canada Radio Facilities. ACMO provided management services to station owners, including selecting and training personnel and operating stations on behalf of their owners.

Taylor, Pearson & Carson subsequently acquired interests in several stations that it had originally been retained to manage. CKWX in Vancouver and CFGP in Grande Prairie, Alberta, were among stations that ultimately came under the company's ownership after initially being managed through ACMO.

=== Expansion into television ===
All-Canada established a television division on June 1, 1953, with Reo Thompson as its head. Ross McCreath handled television sales in Toronto and John Cameron in Montreal. The company was preparing for the emergence of privately owned Canadian television stations and sent representatives to study television advertising and station representation in the United States.

In 1957, the company changed its name from All-Canada Radio Facilities Ltd. to All-Canada Radio & Television Ltd. The company subsequently became a major representative of privately owned Canadian television stations as well as radio stations.

J. Stuart MacKay became president of All-Canada following Carson's death in 1959. In 1960, the company moved into the All-Canada Building at 1000 Yonge Street in Toronto. Its facilities included space for the program division's distribution operations, which by then handled films for television stations as well as recorded radio programming.

The company's program-distribution activities later expanded into syndicated films for television stations. All-Canada Television became the exclusive Canadian representative and distributor for Ziv Television Programs in the 1950s. Programs offered through All-Canada included Mr. District Attorney, Boston Blackie, I Led Three Lives, Favorite Story and The Cisco Kid. It also handled the Canadian distribution of Ziv's The Eddie Cantor Comedy Theatre, which premiered on CHCH-TV in January 1955 and was scheduled to be carried by 13 Canadian stations.

By 1964, All-Canada's television syndication catalogue included Biography, All-Star Golf, Championship Bowling, Championship Bridge and Golf Tip of the Day. Its program division provided film importing, editing, shipping and national, regional and local distribution services.

=== Selkirk Communications ===
In 1965, Selkirk Holdings Limited was established as a publicly traded holding company with Southam, Taylor, Pearson & Carson and Armadale as major shareholders. Over the following several years, jointly held broadcasting companies, including All-Canada, were brought under the Selkirk organization. Selkirk Holdings subsequently became Selkirk Communications.

All-Canada continued to operate as Selkirk's broadcast representation business. It also expanded internationally. All-Canada opened offices in New York, Chicago and Los Angeles in 1962, and Selkirk later established radio and television representation businesses in the United States and the United Kingdom.

=== Sale and dissolution ===
In 1989, Maclean-Hunter acquired Selkirk Communications and its subsidiaries. All-Canada was subsequently sold to Rogers Broadcasting.

All-Canada sold its television representation division to Western Broadcast Sales in 1991. On December 31, 1992, All-Canada Radio was merged with United Broadcast Sales to form Canadian Broadcast Sales, jointly owned by Rogers Broadcasting and Westcom Radio. Patrick Grierson became president of the new company.

== See also ==
- Selkirk Communications
- History of broadcasting in Canada
- Canadian Association of Broadcasters
