= Robert Stebbins =

Robert Stebbins may refer to:

- Robert Stebbins, pen name of American filmmaker Sidney Meyers (1906–1969)
- Robert A. Stebbins (born 1938), Canadian sociologist
- Robert C. Stebbins (1915–2013), American herpetologist and illustrator
- Robert C. Stebbins, United States consul taken hostage in the 1975 AIA building hostage crisis
