= Eveline Charles =

Canadian hairdresser

- Eveline Charles with Vidal Sassoon
- Born: Falher, Alberta Canada
- Died: January 12, 2025
- Occupations: President and CEO, EvelineCharles Salons and Spas
- Website: https://www.evelinecharles.com

Eveline Charles was a Canadian hairdresser and business woman in the beauty salon and day spa industry.

== Early life ==
Charles was born and raised in the small French community of Falher, Alberta.

== Professional career ==
Eveline Charles enrolled in Beauty School immediately after high school in 1973. She began cutting hair professionally in 1974, and ten years later opened her first salon, 'Bianco Nero' in Edmonton.

During the 1980s and early 90s, Charles established Bianco Nero as a premier Edmonton beauty salon. At the forefront of the day spa movement, in 1995 Charles expanded the location to include a full-service day spa. A second Bianco Nero salon and spa was opened in West Edmonton Mall in 1998, and it was during this period that Charles stepped out from behind the salon chair to focus entirely on developing the business.

The business was then rebranded to 'EvelineCharles' in 2000, and has since expanded throughout Western Canada. Today, EvelineCharles Salons & Spas has four locations in Edmonton and Calgary. A complete range of beauty services are offered, including modern hairstyling, colouring, highlights, manicures & pedicures, facials, massage, hair removal (waxing), and wedding packages. Specific locations in Edmonton and Calgary offer their Beauty MD services of laser hair removal, Botox, Restylane, chemical peels, photo rejuvenation, skin resurfacing, leg vein treatments, lip enhancements and more.

Furthermore, In 2005 Charles opened her first EC Academy a beauty institute in Edmonton, Alberta offering Cosmetology, Esthetics and Makeup Artistry courses. In 2010, she opened her second Academy location in Vancouver, British Columbia, which was closed due to funding. She was set to open a third EC Academy location in Calgary in early 2011. As of today, all EC Academy locations and several salons have been permanently shut down.

== Accolades ==
Ivey School of Business and Scotiabank Group, Canada’s Most Powerful Women Top 100 2007
Profit Magazine, Top 100 Women Entrepreneurs 2007 (26), 2006 (31), 2005 (36), 2004 (48)
Global Salon Business Awards, Global Salon Entrepreneur of the Year 2006, 2004
Junior Achievement Alberta Business Hall of Fame, First Female Inductee, 2003
Consumer’s Choice Awards, Business Woman of the Year 2002
Alberta Venture Magazine, Marketer of the Year 2001

== Community ==
EvelineCharles Salons and Spas supports the Youth Emergency Shelter Society (YESS) and their "Homeless for a Night" annual event. Eveline was also a founding member of the Board of Directors for the Compassion House Foundation – where breast cancer patients receive support during diagnosis, treatment and recovery. Other organizations that the company supports include Stollery Children's Hospital, Canadian Cancer Society, Canadian Diabetes Association, United Way and Unicef.

== See also ==
- EC Academy
