= Free FM (disambiguation) =

Free FM can refer to:

- CFRI-FM, a radio station in Grande Prairie, Alberta, Canada that identifies itself as 104.7 FreeFM
- CKLO-FM, a radio station in London, Ontario, Canada that identifies itself as 98.1 Free FM
- Free FM, a short-lived, mostly-talk-radio format and brand name for eleven FM CBS Radio stations in the United States
- Free-FM (Sydney, Australia), a gay & lesbian radio station formerly operated in Sydney, Australia
- Free FM (Hamilton, New Zealand), a community radio station in Hamilton, New Zealand
