= CKRP-FM =

Radio station in Falher, Alberta

Coordinates: 55.727°N 117.201°W

- Falher, Alberta; Canada
- Frequency: 95.7 MHz
- Branding: Nord-Ouest FM

Programming
- Language: French
- Format: community

Ownership
- Owner: Société CKRP Radio Rivière la Paix

History
- First air date: October 1996

Technical information
- Class: A
- ERP: vertical polarization only: 671 watts average 1300 watts peak
- HAAT: 16 metres (52 ft)

Links
- Website: https://www.nordouestfm.ca

CKRP-FM, branded as Nord-Ouest FM since 2020, is a Canadian French language community radio station that operates at 95.7 FM in Falher, Alberta. The station was established in the early 1990s-via several temporary on-air samples-and signed in October 1996. From 1996 to 2017, it was operated by the regional ACFA.

On November 21, 2017, it was announced that CKRP-FM would cease to operate. The station was relaunched under a new committee independent of the ACFA in 2019.

== Rebroadcasters ==
City of licence	Identifier	Frequency	RECNet	CRTC Decision
Nampa	CKRP-FM-1	102.9	Query	
Peace River	CKRP-FM-2	90.3	Query	97-297
