= CIAM-FM =

Radio station in Fort Vermilion, Alberta, Canada

Coordinates: 58°22′45″N 116°00′56″W

- Fort Vermilion, Alberta; Canada
- Frequency: 92.7 MHz

Programming
- Format: community radio

Ownership
- Owner: CIAM Media & Radio Broadcasting Association

Technical information
- Class: LP
- ERP: 30 watts vertical polarization only
- HAAT: 58 meters (190 ft)

Links
- Website: ciamradio.com

CIAM-FM is a community Christian radio station broadcasting at 92.7 MHz on the FM dial in Fort Vermilion, Alberta, Canada. CIAM-FM is a listener supported community broadcast. CIAM Media & Radio Broadcasting Association is the registered charity that holds the broadcast license.

CIAM-FM carries music programming, community events, national & international news, sports, weather and syndicated spoken word content. Some content is in local ethnic languages including Cree, Dene, and Plaudt Deutsch.

== History ==
The station in Fort Vermilion began broadcasting in January 2003 at 92.3 MHz on the FM dial but moved to 92.7 FM around 2004.

CIAM-FM has many rebroadcast transmitters in Alberta, British Columbia, Saskatchewan and the Northwest Territories.

== Rebroadcasters ==
Rebroadcasters of CIAM-FM
City of licence	Identifier	Frequency	RECNet	CRTC Decision
Red Earth, Alberta	CIAM-FM-1	102.9 FM	Query	2004-173
Buffalo Head/La Crete, Alberta	CIAM-FM-2	95.5 FM	Query	2004-171
Watt Mountain/High Level, Alberta	CIAM-FM-3	94.1 FM	Query	2004-174
Foggy Mountain/Caribou Mountain, Alberta	CIAM-FM-4	104.3 FM	Query	2004-172
Weberville/Peace River, Alberta	CIAM-FM-5	101.7 FM	Query	2006-280
Hines Creek, Alberta	CIAM-FM-6	94.7 FM	Query	
Slave Lake, Alberta	CIAM-FM-7	107.5 FM	Query	
Charlie Lake, British Columbia	CIAM-FM-8	92.5 FM	Query	2007-153
Dawson Creek, British Columbia	CIAM-FM-9	107.5 FM	Query	
Buckland, Saskatchewan	CIAM-FM-10	100.1 FM	Query	2008-302
Vanderhoof, British Columbia	CIAM-FM-11	98.5 FM	Query	
Cleardale, Alberta	CIAM-FM-12	91.5 FM	Query	
Peerless Lake, Alberta	CIAM-FM-13	96.9 FM	Query	
Wabasca, Alberta	CIAM-FM-14	95.5 FM	Query	
Fort Chipewyan, Alberta	CIAM-FM-15	95.5 FM	Query	
Meander River, Alberta	CIAM-FM-16	95.9 FM	Query	
Chateh, Alberta	CIAM-FM-17	96.9 FM	Query	
Manning, Alberta	CIAM-FM-18	95.5 FM	Query	
Prespatou, British Columbia	CIAM-FM-19	105.5 FM	Query	
Prince Albert, Saskatchewan	CIAM-FM-22	107.1 FM	Query	2012-438
Taber, Alberta	CIAM-FM-23	102.5 FM	Query	
Burnt Hill, Alberta	CIAM-FM-24	101.9 FM	Query	
Saskatoon Hill, Alberta	CIAM-FM-25	89.3 FM	Query	
Rose Prairie, British Columbia	CIAM-FM-26	107.5 FM	Query	
Boston Bar, British Columbia	CIAM-FM-27	91.1 FM	Query	2017-336
Telegraph Creek, British Columbia	CIAM-FM-28	92.7 FM	Query	2018-392
Corman Park, Saskatchewan	CIAM-FM-29	100.9 FM	Query	
Fort Liard, Northwest Territories	CIAM-FM-30	95.1 FM	Query	2019-108

On May 16, 2008, CIAM has applied to the CRTC to add a transmitter at Buckland, Saskatchewan and another at Vanderhoof, British Columbia Also on July 15, 2008 the station applied to add more rebroadcasters to a number of communities in Alberta and received approval on November 6, 2008.

On March 13, 2009, an application received by CIAM Media & Radio Broadcasting Association proposes to amend the technical parameters of its transmitter, CIAM-FM-11 Vanderhoof, British Columbia, by changing the frequency from 97.9 MHz to 98.5 MHz. This frequency change was approved on May 12, 2009.

On April 22, 2010, CIAM-FM applied to add more transmitters in these following locations: 89.5 MHz Three Hills, Alberta, 105.5 MHz Prespatou, British Columbia and 107.5 MHz in Dawson Creek, British Columbia. This application was denied by the CRTC on August 20, 2010. On March 17, 2011, the station reapplied to add new transmitters in Three Hills, Alberta, Prespatou, British Columbia and Dawson Creek, British Columbia. All three of these locations were approved by the CRTC on July 28, 2011.

On October 25, 2011, the CRTC approved an application by CIAM-FM Media & Radio Broadcasting Association to change the authorized contours of its transmitter CIAM-FM-12 Cleardale, Alberta by decreasing the antenna's effective height above average terrain from 48.5 to 39.07 metres and relocating the transmitter site.

On August 9, 2012, CIAM received approval from the CRTC to add a transmitter at Prince Albert, Saskatchewan. The new Prince Albert transmitter will operate at 107.1 MHz on the FM band.

On June 8, 2016, the CRTC approved CIAM Media & Radio Broadcasting Association's application to operate a low-power rebroadcasting transmitter in Taber, Alberta which will operate at 89.3 MHz (channel 207LP) with an effective radiated power of 50 watts (non-directional antenna with an effective height of antenna above average terrain of 25.85 metres). Its unknown if or when the Taber transmitter signed on at 89.5 MHz instead of 89.3 MHz. On May 25, 2019, CIAM received CRTC approval to change frequencies for CIAM-FM-23 in Taber, Alberta from 89.5 MHz to 102.5 MHz. Power would increase from 50 to 1,500 watts. EHAAT would rise from 41.3 to 46.2 metres.

On September 19, 2017, CIAM Media & Radio Broadcasting Association received CRTC approval to add rebroadcast FM transmitters at Burnt Hills, Alberta (101.9 MHz with ERP of 50 watts and EHAAT of 82.99 metres), Saskatoon Hill, Alberta (89.3 MHz with an ERP of 50 watts and EHAAT of 156.3 metres), Rose Prairie, British Columbia (107.5 MHz with ERP of 50 watts and EHAAT of 104.6 metres), and Boston Bar, British Columbia (91.1 MHz with ERP of 50 watts and EHAAT of -537.2 metres).

On October 4, 2018, the CRTC approved CIAM’s applications to add FM transmitters at Telegraph Creek, British Columbia on 92.7 MHz with ERP of 50 watts and Corman Park, Saskatchewan on 102.9 MHz with ERP of 50 watts.

On April 15, 2019, CIAM received CRTC approval to add a new FM transmitter in Fort Liard, Northwest Territories that would operate on 95.1 MHz with 50 watts.
