= Beauty salon =

Hair and cosmetic treatment salon

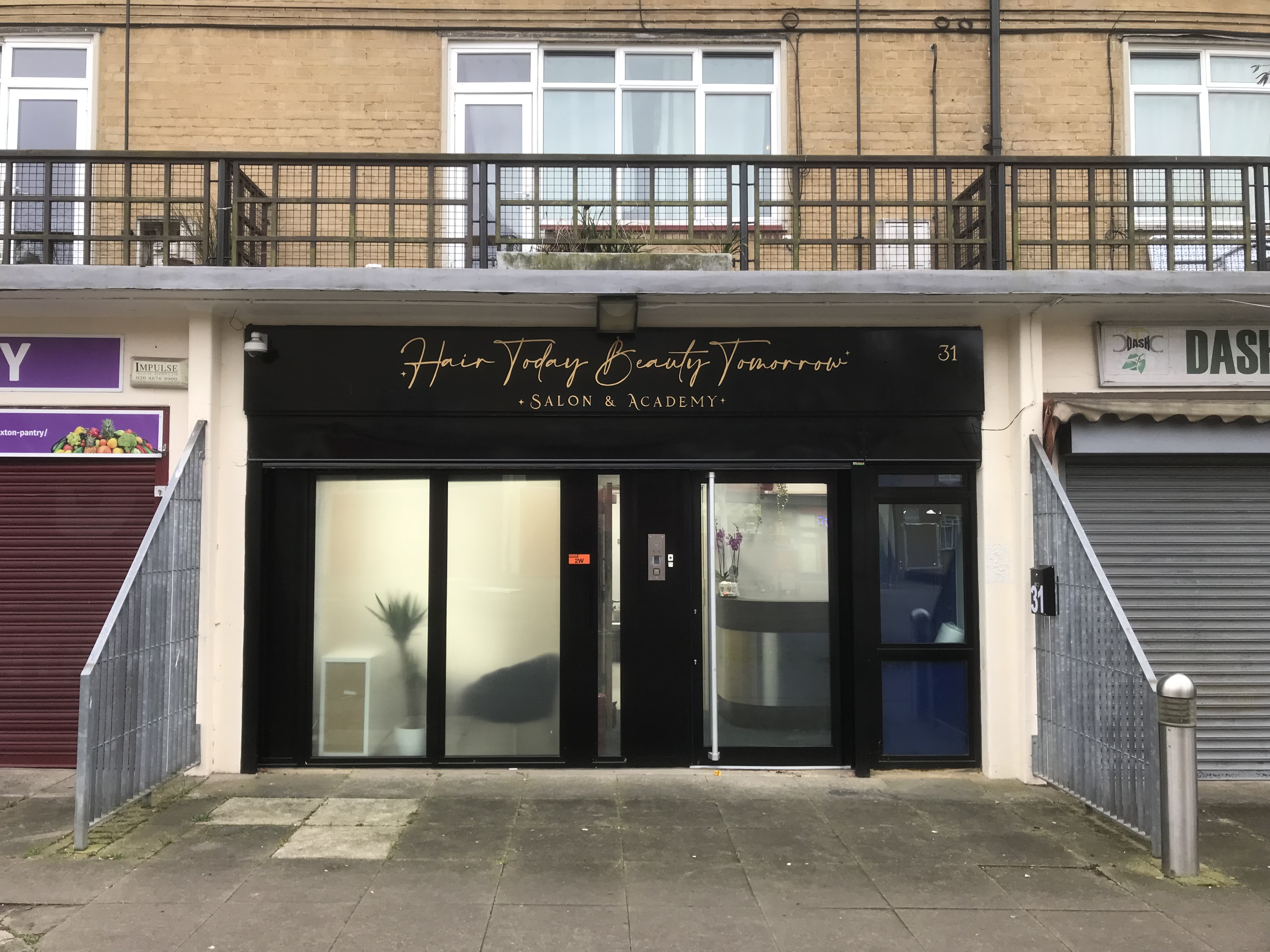
- A beauty salon in Kingswood Estate, London, 2025
- Type: Barbers
- Industry: Cosmetics
- Key people: Eveline Charles; Vidal Sassoon
- Net income: £27.2bn (UK) (2024)
- Number of employees: 224,000 (UK) (2024)

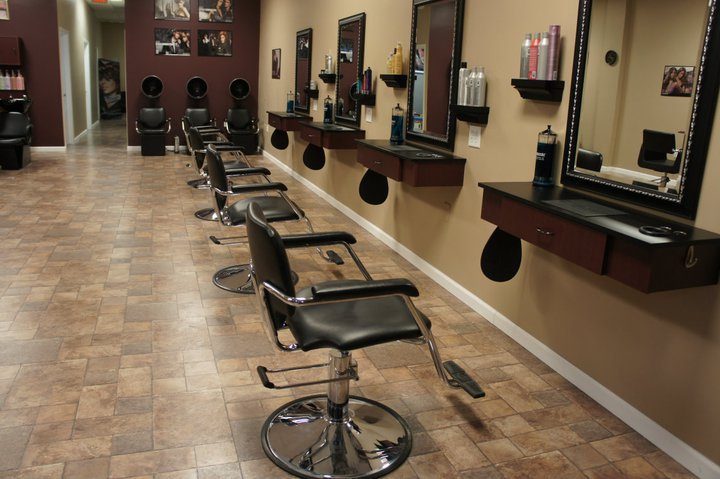
Hair salon styling floor

A beauty salon or beauty parlor is an establishment that provides cosmetic treatments for people. Other variations of this type of business include hair salons, spas, day spas, and medical spas.

== Beauty treatments ==
Haircuts are generally offered in most beauty salons. Massages for the body are another beauty treatment, with various techniques offering benefits to the skin (including the application of beauty products) and increasing mental well-being. Hair removal is offered at some beauty salons through treatments such as waxing and threading. Some beauty salons also style hair instead of requiring clients to go to a separate hair salon. Some also offer sun tanning via tanning beds.

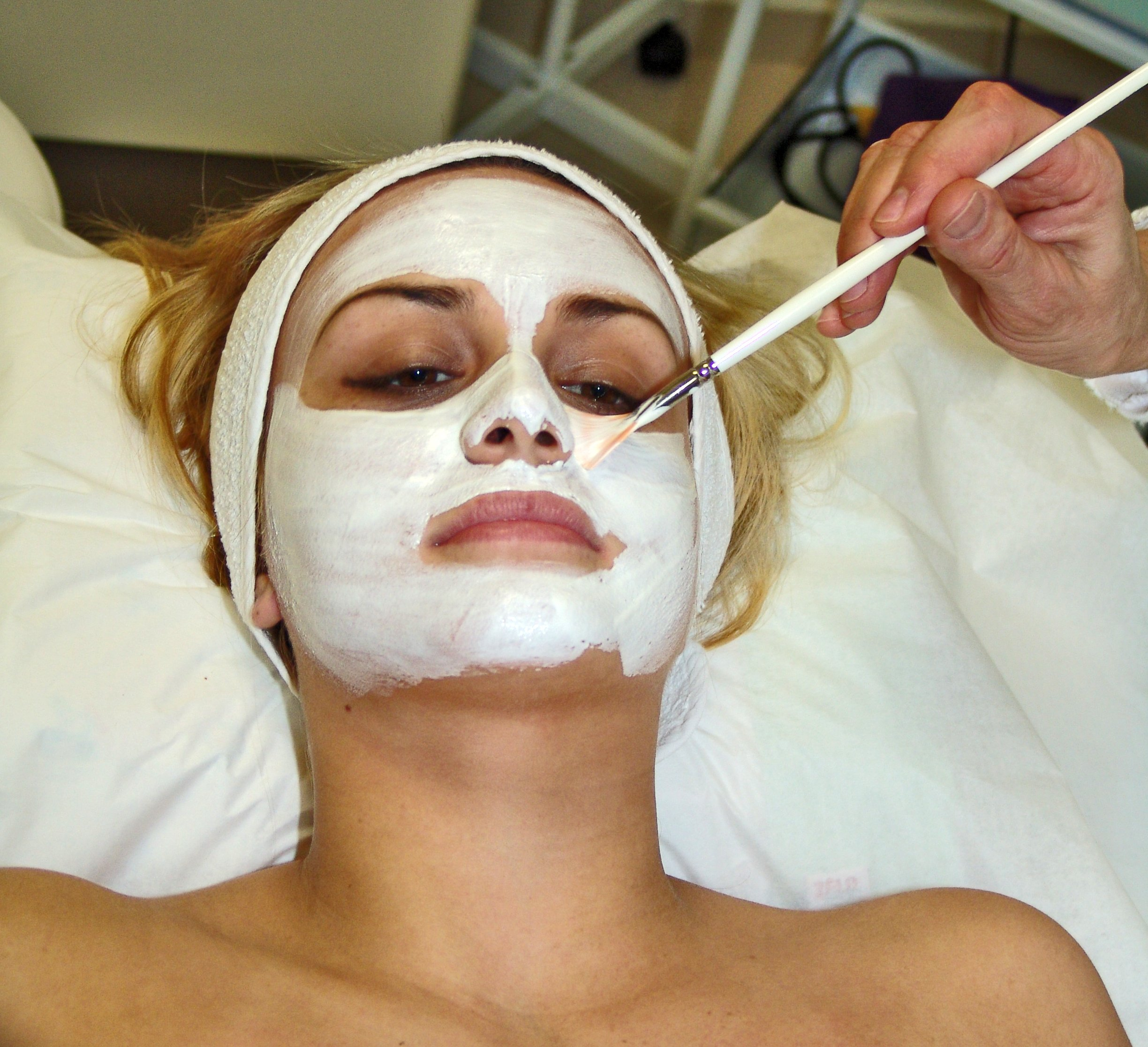
Facials may include the use of a facial mask

Another popular beauty treatment specific to the face is known as a facial. The perceived effects of a facial mask treatment include revitalization, healing, or refreshment of the skin. They may yield temporary benefits depending on environmental, dietary, and other skincare factors. Although customers seek out these services for anti-aging or anti-inflammatory results, there is little to no objective evidence that there are any long-term benefits to the various available facial treatments.

Specialized beauty salons known as nail salons offer treatments such as manicures and pedicures for the nails. A manicure is a treatment for the hands that involves trimming and filing of the fingernails and softening the cuticles in preparation for the application of nail polish. A pedicure is a treatment for the feet that involves trimming and filing of the toenails in preparation for the application of nail polish, as well as the softening or removal of calluses.

== Inventions throughout history ==
Throughout time there have been many inventions that have contributed to the formation of beauty salons.

=== Late 19th century ===
During this time there were many innovations in hair salons. The world's first hair dryer was invented in France in 1890. The device was very large and was only able to be used in hair salons, this was a big advancement in hairstyling, it was able to give beauticians much more flexibility and precision in the hair styles they offered.

=== 20th century ===
Towards the beginning of the 1900s, chemical and heat treatment techniques were being experimented with to create the first permanent wave. In 1909 the first electric permanent wave machine was patented.

During World War II, many women entered the workforce to fill the jobs that were left behind. Hairstyles were evolving and required professional treatments. More women began visiting the beauty salon; hair coloring was in high in demand during this time. Movies and television helped to popularize trends, like perms, crimps, and bleached or dyed hair. Beauty salons increased in popularity. By the late 1900s beauty salons were not only seen for women. There were a large number of male clients, many of whom wanted treatments such as perms, or other hairstyles that had to be done at the salon.

The "permanent waving machine", patented by Marjorie Joner in 1928, was a device that allowed quick, efficient curling, as opposed to the curl-by-curl method used at the time. After seating the client in a chair, the salonist would wrap damp hair around the heated, wire rollers that hung from above. It was used in many beauty salons in the 20th century.

The "sew-in" technique, patented in 1951, was invented by Christina Jenkins. At the time, people would attach weaves to their hair by using hairpins. This was not very secure, so Jenkins had the idea of sewing the weave into the hair. The process was described as "interweaving strands of live hair and strands of commercial hair, with cord like material to permanently join the strands thereto."

== Entrepreneurs throughout history ==
=== Annie Turnbo Malone ===
Annie Malone was a woman born in 1869, she was orphaned at a young age. She realized that for many African American women their appearance mattered more than their personal style. She also realized how appearance can indicate a woman's social class. She took inspiration to develop hair products from styling her sister’s hair; she soon began experimenting with chemistry and was able to establish a business. She developed products that helped improve scalp health and hair growth.

=== Madame C.J. Walker (born Sarah Breedlove) ===
Madame C.J. Walker was also orphaned at a young age, she struggled with hair issues of her own; which why she began experimenting with solutions. After finishing college she decided to change her name to Madame C.J. Walker. She then started to develop her own hair product line, which included "Glossine and Pressing oil" and "Wonderful Hair Grower." She worked with Annie Malone and was able to start her own business from her guidance.

== Beauty salons by country ==
=== Afghanistan ===
There were thousands of beauty salons in Afghanistan before the Taliban outlawed them in July 2023, mandating their closure within a month.

=== Brazil ===
==== Black/ethnic beauty salons ====
Hair functions as a key element of Black identity, it carries both cultural and social meaning. Beauty salons that primarily serve the Black population play an important role in how hair and identity are understood. These spaces promote Afro-textured and curly hair are equally as beautiful as straight hair. The process of accepting one's natural hair becomes challenging, but often connected to the broader acceptance of the Black phenotype, which contributes to development of self-esteem and stronger sense of racial identity.

Through provided services, ethnic beauty salons operate as spaces of community and refuge. Ethnic individuals enter these environments often encounter a setting where they can share personal experiences, exchange ideas, and engage in conversations related to identity and representation. These salons can be seen as a role of support and cultural affirmation.

Ethnic beauty salons also contribute to development of aesthetic standards that differ from dominant Western aesthetics. By centering Black hair textures and styles, they participate in the reinforcement of alternative beauty standards. As a result, ethnic beauty salons are closely connected to construction of Black identity in Brazil.

The identification of these spaces as "ethnic" and its emphasis on promoting positive representations of Blackness, positioning them within broader social and political discussions. In a society built on racial inequality, the act of affirming Black beauty carries not only cultural issues, but also political and ideological.

There is a noticeable shift in how Black hair is represented, while it has often been characterized as difficult or undesirable, the increasing acceptance of Afro-textured and curly hair reflects a transformation in aesthetic values. There becomes a redefinition of beauty standards, in which Black aesthetics are more visibly recognized and validated.

==== Beauty courses ====
Many of Brazil's hair courses historically emphasized hair straightening as the main technique when face to face with afro-textured hair. As a result, straight hair became associated with Western beauty standards and was widely accepted, while Afro-textured hair was often treated as something needed to be fixed. In some cases, these hair straightening practices led to physical harm, such as burns caused by repeated chemical treatments.

Ethnic beauty salons serve as important sites for knowledge exchange and support. The clients who may not fully understand how to care for their ethnic hair usually sought guidance in these spaces, asking questions that typically go unanswered in traditional salons. In many cases, shared experiences between stylists and clients, particularly those with the same hair types and same background helps the client understand.

=== India ===
Beauty parlors employed 3.4 million people across India in 2013. The industry was expected to employ 12.1 million workers by 2022. Services typically include facials, skin-lightening bleaches, waxing, hair coloring, and hair straightening.

=== United States ===
Beauty salons have been a recession-resistant industry across the United States. Although sales had declined from 2008 highs due to the Great Recession, they remain robust with a long-term positive forecast. Despite the tendency for consumers to be more price-conscious during recessions, spending continued to increase. With rising per capita incomes across the United States since 2015, beauty salons boomed, generating $56.2 billion in the United States. Hair care was the largest segment, with 86,000 locations. Skincare was expected to generate $21.09 billion in revenue by 2023, growing annually by 3.91%. This growth was driven in part by increasing awareness of the importance of skin care among American women, but also specifically due to an increase in the market for men.

In 2020, the market was distributed widely across America, with a concentration in the Northeast and Midwest. There was also a growing trend in boutique salons popping up and leveraging online marketing to gain customers and compete with the franchise chains. In 2014, the US Labor Department estimated employment in the United States increased 20% between 2008 and 2014, with the greatest employment growth from skincare specialists. Beauty salons employ cosmetologists specializing in general beautification techniques. Cosmetology licensing requirements vary from state to state and depend on which specific license type is desired: general cosmetologist, hair stylist, esthetician, manicurist, barber, electrologist, or other. Hair salon professionals are increasingly becoming independent businesses, a trend that accelerated during the COVID-19 pandemic. By 2022, most of the more than 1.2 million salon-related businesses in the United States were independently owned, and 33% of the workers were self employed.

==== Black beauty salons ====
In many African cultures, hair has been associated with spirituality, as well as a marker of age, religion, and social status. During slavery in America, the cutting of hair was used as a method of control and dehumanization. By removing hair, enslavers sought to disconnect African slaves from their cultural identity and heritage. This act was enslavers' first attempt to suppress African identity in the period of slavery.

Beginning during slavery and the post-emancipation era, hairstyling and barbering were among the limited professions that were available to Black people in the United States.

During the 20th century, Black beauty salons became established within African American communities where individuals could gather to share information and build social networks. They used salons as spaces for political activism and discussion within African American communities during segregation and the Civil Rights movement. Figures such as Madam C.J Walker and Annie Turnbo Malone assisted with the expansion of the Black beauty industry, especially for Black women. Malone opened Poro College Company, a cosmetics school which helped the employment of African Americans. Walker used her manufacturing company to open training programs like the "Walker System" and employed 40,000 African American men and women in the United States. A scholarly review of Beauty Shop Politics: African American Women's Activism in the Beauty Industry by Tiffany Gill notes that Black beauticians often operated with financial independence due to having primarily Black clients.

==== Economics ====
The salon industry is a growing and lively component of the U.S economy; the annual sales are more than $62 billion. The industry has had a steady growth for the last two decades and is projected to increase by 9% by 2028.

Beauty salons provide a pathway to ownership opportunities. Not only do they provide employment opportunities for all individuals, they also provide opportunities for individuals to own businesses for themselves. More specifically they provide women with more opportunities, about 74% of all salon businesses are women owned, about 33% are owned by black women.

=== Vietnam ===
According to the Ministry of Health, as of December 2023, Vietnam has a total of 11,752 establishments providing aesthetic services. Of these, only 598 establishments are licensed to operate in accordance with Ministry of Health regulations. In Ho Chi Minh City, there are 7,087 establishments providing aesthetic services, of which only 598 are licensed to operate. In Hanoi, there are 2,044 establishments providing aesthetic services, of which only 200 are licensed to operate.

== Cultural and social significance of salons ==
Beauty salons have operated as social environments in addition to providing cosmetic services. People may interact and facilitate routine interactions between clients and workers, which contribute to the maintenance of social relationships. Salons may also serve as spaces where informal communication occurs, relating to personal experiences or local issues.

== Infectious diseases risk in beauty salons ==
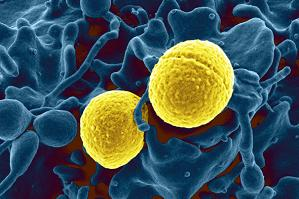
Staphylococcus aureus bacteria.

People who work in beauty salons include hairdressers, nail technicians, estheticians, and other licensed cosmetic workers. Those who work at beauty salons are at risk of being exposed to infectious diseases. Reasons for this include the direct physical contact between worker and client, and the amount of and the use of tools that can lead to breaks in the skin, increasing exposure to infectious pathogens such as bacteria, viruses, and fungi. Studies have shown that beauty salons are often breeding grounds for infections, such as antibiotic-resistant Staphylococcus aureus (MRSA) infections and fungal infections, which can easily spread through cuts or abrasions that can occur from beauty treatments. Further, infectious diseases such as HIV, hepatitis B and C, herpes, chronic fungal infections, hair lice, and eye and skin infections have all been attributed to beauty salons.

Several risk factors contribute to the vulnerability of beauty salon worker's health in terms of infectious disease. Beauty salon workers directly touch and use tools on client's bodies, such as scissors, razors, and metal combs, that can create nicks, cuts, or abrasions on the skin that could introduce or spread infectious disease. Various cosmetic tools are also known to be ideal environments for pathogens to thrive, creating an opportunistic environment for disease spread when not cleaned sufficiently. Unsafe sanitation practices, such as the reuse of unsterilized or improperly sanitized tools, and poor hygiene protocols, all contribute to infectious disease spread and are prevalent in many beauty salons. Sanitation is very important in preventing disease transmission in beauty salons. Regular disinfection of tools, the use of disposable tools instead of reusable tools, the use personal protective equipment, and maintaining sanitary workstations are all outlined by Sanaat (2021) as essential practices for avoiding infectious disease spread. Additionally, personal protective equipment, such as surgical gloves and masks, can significantly reduce exposure to infectious agents in the workplace.

Another risk factor that beauty salon workers and clients face is contamination of beauty products used in beauty salons, such as moisturizers, lotions, lipsticks, eyeliners, powders, and mascaras. Cosmetic products provide the ideal environment for microbial growth and have been found to be contaminated with several pathogens such as bacteria, funguses, and yeasts in beauty salons using these products.

To lessen the risk of acquiring infectious diseases in the workplace, Mancini et al. recommends implementing strong infection control measures, as well as ensuring those who work at beauty salons receive proper training on hygiene practices. By prioritizing sanitation and disease prevention, the health of beauty salon workers and their clients can be safeguarded, creating a safer work environment. Overall, the sheer amount of biological hazards in beauty salons creates a complex risk environment for workers and clients.
