= CHBW-FM =

Radio station in Rocky Mountain House, Alberta

- Rocky Mountain House, Alberta; Canada
- Frequency: 94.5 MHz
- Branding: 94.5 Rewind Radio

Programming
- Format: Classic hits

Ownership
- Owner: Jim Pattison Group

History
- First air date: 1997
- Call sign meaning: Big West

Technical information
- Class: A
- ERP: 720 watts
- HAAT: 71.5 metres (235 ft)
- Transmitter coordinates: 52.371°N 114.917°W

Links
- Website: 945rewindradio.ca

CHBW-FM is a Canadian radio station, that broadcasts a classic hits format at 94.5 FM in Rocky Mountain House, Alberta. The station is owned by Jim Pattison Group.

Owned by the Jim Pattison Group the station was licensed in 1997. In 2000, the station was authorized to add a transmitter at Nordegg on the frequency 93.9 FM to replace the rebroadcaster CIBW-FM at Drayton Valley.

In early 2008, CHBW-FM broke away from CIBW-FM and became its own entity in the classic hits genre and was rebranded B-94 "Playing Whatever".

The station later switched to a hot adult contemporary format in the early 2010s, dropping the "Playing Whatever" moniker in favor of the new format.

In March 2021, the station had returned to broadcasting a classic hits format while keeping its current branding. Recently, In September 2021, the station rebranded to 94.5 Rewind Radio while retaining the classic hits format. It still rebroadcasts on 93.9 FM Nordegg.
