= Falher =

- Town
- Town of Falher; Ville de Falher
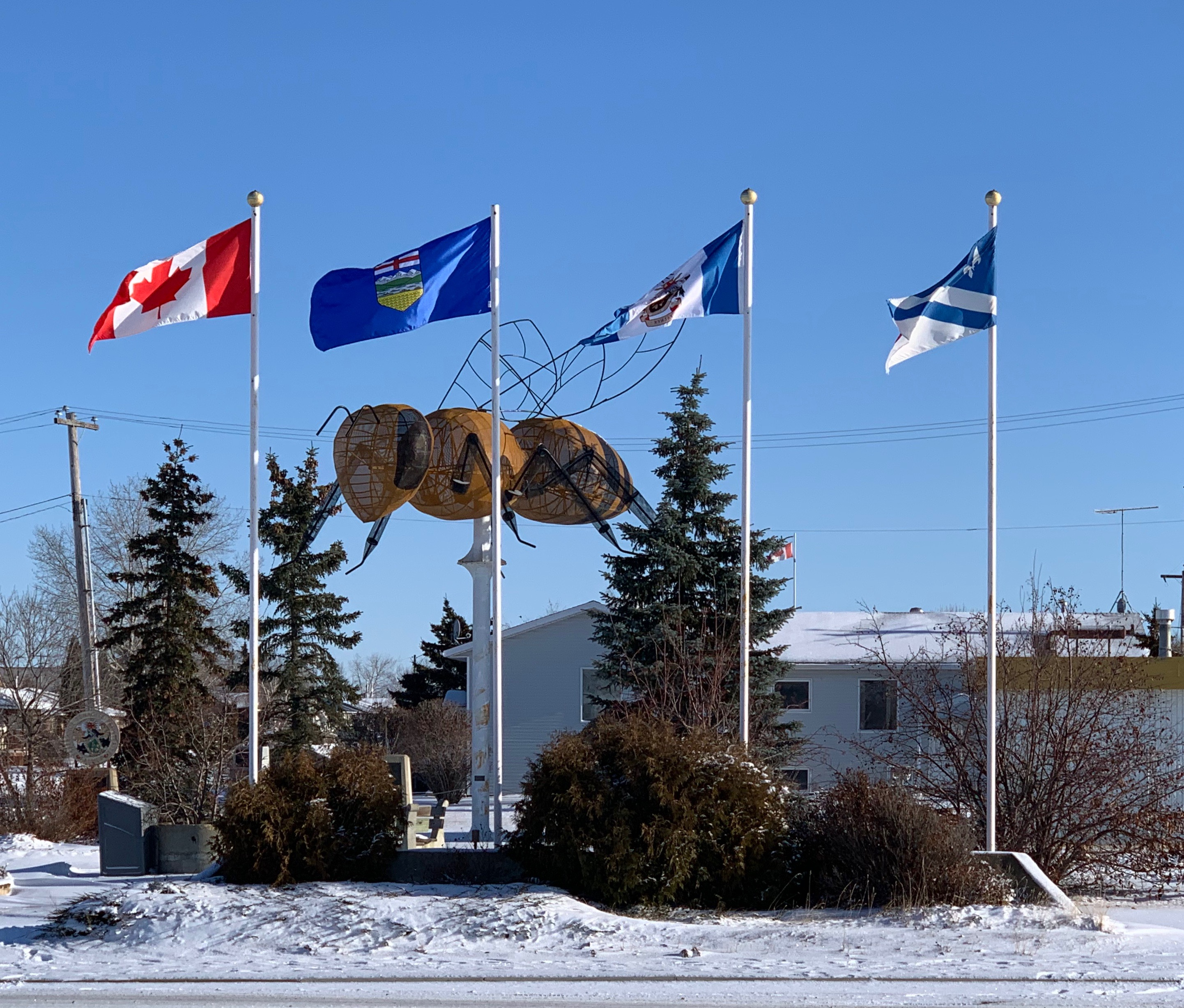
- The world's largest honey bee Statue

- Flag Coat of arms
- Nickname: Honey Capital of Canada
- Location of Falher in Alberta
- Coordinates: 55°44′14″N 117°12′05″W
- Country: Canada
- Province: Alberta
- Region: Northern Alberta
- Census division: 19
- Municipal district: Municipal District of Smoky River No. 130
- Incorporated
  - Village: September 5, 1923
  - Dissolution: August 9, 1926
  - Village: March 13, 1929
  - Town: January 1, 1955

Government
  - Mayor: Donna Buchinski
  - Governing body: Falher Town Council

Area (2021)
  - Land: 2.83 km^{2} (1.09 sq mi)
- Elevation: 587 m (1,926 ft)

Population (2021)
  - Total: 1,001
  - Density: 354.1/km^{2} (917/sq mi)
- Time zone: UTC−06:00 (Alberta Time)
- Area code: +1-780
- Highways: Highway 49; Highway 2
- Website: Official website

Falher (/fəˈlɛər/; fə-LAIR, French pronunciation: [fɑlɛːʁ]) is a town in the Peace Country area of Alberta, Canada. It is located in the Municipal District of Smoky River No. 130, along Highway 49. Falher is one of the earliest agricultural communities in the Peace River Country, and still acts as the commercial centre of the surrounding Smoky River Region, with which it shares much of its history. Falher is notable for its sizable francophone population, having the highest percentage of French speakers of any municipality in Western Canada, with 52% able to speak the language as of 2021.

== Etymology ==
The name of the colony and first mission of Saint-Jean-Baptiste de Falher was chosen on June 1, 1912 by the first party of settlers, accompanied by Fathers Constant Falher and Jean-Baptiste Henri Giroux. During a gathering for prayer, Giroux suggested the name “Saint-Constant de Falher,” which was met with protests by Fr. Falher. The group settled on the name by combining Giroux’s first name and Fr. Falher’s family name. The surname is ultimately derived from Breton falc’her (cognate with French faucher) meaning “scytheman.” When the mission was officially elevated to a parish by Bishop Émile Grouard on June 14, 1917, he chose to erect it under the patronage of Saint Anne as there was already a mission named Saint-Jean-Baptiste in present-day Fort McMurray, built a year prior to that in Falher.

The settlements of Falher, Donnelly and Girouxville were referred to by the Cree jointly as umstosee owuskee, meaning “Frenchman’s Land.” J. Fromhold provides the alternate Cree name of mistik asissw owaski to Falher and Donnelly, literally “Little Stick House" (in reference to the mission church), the Cree supposedly identifying the French as the mistik asis iniw or “Little Stick People.”

== History ==
A gathering of residents around the 2nd church of Falher (1916)

The area was known to missionaries before it was surveyed in 1909 as an Indian trail that led to British Columbia and where the Edmonton, Dunvegan and British Columbia Railway later laid its tracks. In 1912, the settlement of Mission Saint-Jean-Baptiste de Falher was opened 5 km (3.1 mi) from the current location of the Town of Falher. When the railway came to the area in 1915, the settlement was named after Father Constant Falher (March 29, 1863 – March 18, 1939), a Roman Catholic Oblate missionary who was born in Josselin, France, arriving at Grouard in 1889. The origin of the majority of local colonizers were from Quebec; some arriving in the area via the United States of America (French American), such as Robert Goulet's family, who settled in Girouxville.

The colony was divided into two: what is now the Village of Donnelly and the Town of Falher. In 1919, the town consolidated a school district and the first parish of Ste. Anne was established. The first post office opened in 1923 when the settlement became a hamlet. It incorporated as a village in 1929 and then as a town in 1955.

In 1963, a celebration of the 50 year anniversary of the settlement of Falher was organized by the regional ACFA, with attendance reaching 'more than 5000'.

== Demographics ==
Federal census population history
Year	Pop.	±%
1926	128	—
1931	253	+97.7%
1936	284	+12.3%
1941	244	−14.1%
1946	279	+14.3%
1951	575	+106.1%
1956	802	+39.5%
1961	741	−7.6%
1966	843	+13.8%
1971	935	+10.9%
1976	1,120	+19.8%
1981	1,102	−1.6%
1986	1,178	+6.9%
1991	1,183	+0.4%
1996	1,149	−2.9%
2001	1,109	−3.5%
2006	941	−15.1%
2011	1,075	+14.2%
2016	1,047	−2.6%
2021	1,001	−4.4%
Source: Statistics Canada

In the 2021 Census of Population conducted by Statistics Canada, the Town of Falher had a population of 1,001 living in 408 of its 474 total private dwellings, a change of −4.4% from its 2016 population of 1,047. With a land area of 2.83 km^{2} (1.09 sq mi), it had a population density of 353.7/km^{2} (916.1/sq mi) in 2021.

In the 2016 Census of Population conducted by Statistics Canada, the Town of Falher recorded a population of 1,047 living in 450 of its 482 total private dwellings, a −2.6% change from its 2011 population of 1,075. With a land area of 2.78 km^{2} (1.07 sq mi), it had a population density of 376.6/km^{2} (975.4/sq mi) in 2016.

== Economy ==
The principal industries in the area are agriculture, forestry, oil and gas.

Established in 1973 as a private business, Falher Alfalfa (an alfalfa processing facility) was sold to a group of producers and farmers in 1978 with the same company. Under normal circumstances, Falher Alfalfa employed a staff of about 35 full-time employees in the spring and 110 at the busiest time of the season. Falher Alfalfa went under the Company Creditor Arrangement Act in June 2007, protecting the company against any legal action taken by creditors and gave the company a chance to sell its product to be able to repay creditors. In spring 2008, Falher Alfalfa declared bankruptcy due to production costs.

== Government ==
The Town of Falher is governed by a mayor (Donna Buchinski) and five councillors who meet on the second Monday of each month. It is currently located in the riding of Peace River—Westlock federally.

== Arts and culture ==
Beginning in 1970, each June, the Falher Honey Festival is held to pay tribute to the beekeeping industry which has created an impact in the Smoky River region and throughout Canada and the United States. The honey in the area is derived largely from clover seed operations. At its peak, more than 48,000 hives in the region produced 10 million pounds (4,500 t) of honey annually.

Falher attracted national attention in 2006 due to its high standing in the "Kraft Hockeyville" contest, a coast-to-coast competition to elect the municipality that most embodies the spirit of Canada's national pastime.

== Attractions ==
Main Street Falher includes a large honey bee statue, as Falher is known as "Honey Capital of Canada". The statue was built by local welder, Richard Ethier and it measures 22 feet 8 inches (6.91 m), and its diameter is 7 feet 7 inches (2.31 m). The Falher Recreational Complex boasts a hockey arena, a private gym and a curling rink. The arena is home to the Falher Pirates, a team within the East Division of the North Peace Hockey League.

== Education ==
There are two public schools in Falher:

- École Héritage School, part of the Conseil scolaire du Nord-Ouest No. 1, is a Francophone school that is located in a building that once served as a farmer's college built by the Oblates in 1951. École Héritage currently has students in grades K–12.
- École Routhier School is another educational institution in Falher. Routhier is an Anglophone and French immersion Elementary School which includes grades K–6. Students in grades 7-12 attend classes at École Georges P. Vanier School in nearby Donnelly, Alberta.

== Media ==
Falher is home to a French-language community radio station, CKRP-FM, which has operated since 1996, and is today branded as Nord-Ouest FM.

As a Franco-Albertan community, Falher has been served by numerous French-language newspapers since its foundation. These include the official publications of the ACFA: La survivance (1928-1967) and its successors, Le franco-albertain (1967-1979), and Le franco (1979 onwards). Since 1966, it has been served by the English-language weekly newspaper, The Smoky River Express.

== Notable people ==
- Gabrielle Bugeaud (1952-), singer, musician, actress
- Robert LaPalme (1908-1997), caricaturist
- Eveline Charles, businesswoman
- Hector Goudreau, Canadian politician, MLA for Central Peace-Notley (2004-2015)

== See also ==
- List of communities in Alberta
- List of francophone communities in Alberta
- List of towns in Alberta
