= Space Trader =

2007 video game

- Developer: HermitWorks Entertainment
- Publisher: HermitWorks Entertainment
- Engine: id Tech 3
- Platforms: Microsoft Windows, Mac OS X, iOS
- Release: Windows, Mac OS X July 25, 2007 iOS; 2009
- Genres: First-person shooter, space trading and combat simulator
- Modes: Single-player, multiplayer

Space Trader is a video game by the Canadian developer HermitWorks Entertainment, for Microsoft Windows and Mac OS X released on July 25, 2007. After the game was open-sourced in 2008, an iOS version followed in 2009.

== Gameplay ==
Space Trader is a combination first person action and trading game with co-operative multiplayer, tied together with online scoreboards. Players assume the role of Traders in a fictitious future universe. Their goal: to make as much money possible within a time limit. They accomplish this by leasing cargo ships, traveling to planets and trading with Merchants. Each Merchant trades different commodities, and each at different prices. Finding successful trade routes between these merchants is one of the strategic elements of the game. Players can also be stopped along the way by an omnipresent government organization known as the Ministry of Accounts, and forced to pay taxes. Shady informants reveal the location of black market merchants and the location of criminal bosses, which the players can attempt to bring down for the bounty placed on their head by the Ministry of Accounts. These fights involve first person shooter gameplay. IGN noted the player's inability to permanently procure new weapons. A basic pistol is always held at the start of a first person shooter segment and can only be replaced temporarily by other weapons found in that environment. Bosses may be characterized as simple bootleggers or high ranking corrupt officials.

Progression consists of unlocking cargo slots and earning the right to access new areas of outer space. The tutorial takes place between only the Earth and Moon.

In multiplayer, players work together in combat and attempt to thwart each other in trading by taking as many bonuses as they can from other players. All scores from games are uploaded to the Space Trader website, and players are ranked against one another. The Space Trader website features community scoreboards and forums, along with information about the game.

== History ==
Space Trader was developed on base of the open-source id Tech 3 engine, as the first commercial title to use that engine since it was open sourced in August 2005. The game's development started in 2005, headed by Cameron Tofer and Marcia Tofer, both previously of BioWare, along with a group of other developers that have joined along the way. The game was released for Microsoft Windows and Mac OS X on July 25, 2007. Currently Space Trader is at version 1.0.4, with a beta version of 1.0.6 available. A free demo is also available on the website.

In April 2008 Space Trader's source code in version 1.1.14 was released.

An iOS version was released in 2009 as Space Trader: Moon Madness.

== Reception ==
An IGN review found the game difficult to praise and insufficiently modern despite being an important continuation of its genre.

== Reviews ==
- The Adrenaline Vault
- GameFocus
- Generation: Gamerz
- Bytten
- Out of Eight
- Killer Betties
