= Robert A. Stebbins =

Canadian and American sociologist (1938–2026)

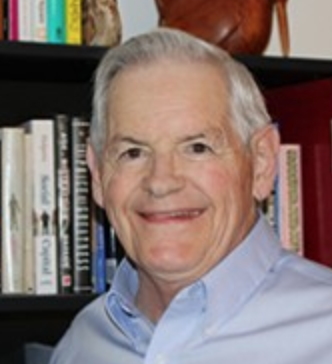
- Born: June 22, 1938; Rhinelander, Wisconsin, U.S.
- Died: May 4, 2026 (aged 87); Calgary, Alberta, Canada
- Occupations: Author, researcher and academic
- Awards: Fellow, Royal Society of Canada

Academic background
- Education: Macalester College; University of Minnesota; B.A. M.A. Ph.D.
- Doctoral advisor: Don Martindale
- Influences: Erving Goffman, Georg Simmel, Alfred Schütz, Barney Glaser and Anselm Strauss

Academic work
- Institutions: University of Calgary

Robert Alan Stebbins (June 22, 1938 – May 4, 2026) was a Canadian sociologist. He was a professor emeritus at the University of Calgary and was associate editor for Leisure and Voluntaristics Review: Brill Research Perspectives.

Stebbins published more than 300 research articles and is the author of 65 books and monographs. Most of his work is in leisure studies and has centered on amateurs, hobbyists, career volunteers, and the serious leisure perspective. Over his career, he has delivered keynote addresses at international conferences, including events in Europe, North America, and Asia.

He was the president of Canadian Sociology and Anthropology Association and Social Science Federation of Canada. He was the recipient of the Outstanding Contribution Award from the Canadian Sociology and Anthropology Association and the Marguerite Dentinger Prize from the Association canadienne-française de l'Alberta. He was elected Fellow of the Royal Society of Canada in 1999. He was also recognized as a Senior Fellow of the World Leisure Academy in 2010.

== Early life and education ==
Stebbins was born in Rhinelander, Wisconsin, on June 22, 1938. He received his bachelor's degree from Macalester College in 1961 and then completed a master's degree and doctoral studies in sociology from the University of Minnesota in 1962 and 1964 respectively.

== Career ==
After receiving his Ph.D., Stebbins was appointed associate professor of sociology at Presbyterian College, where he taught for one year before working at Memorial University of Newfoundland as an assistant professor from 1965 to 1968. For the next three years, Stebbins served as associate professor and head of the Department of Sociology and Anthropology and then taught as a professor from 1971 to 1973. He joined the University of Texas at Arlington as a professor of sociology for a three-year term. In 1976, Stebbins moved to Canada and joined the University of Calgary as head of the Department of Sociology until 1982 and then taught as a professor until 1999. In 2000, he was promoted to faculty professor and then to professor emeritus of sociology. He continued to contribute as a scholarly writer, mentor and speaker at academic events.

Stebbins served as president of the Canadian Sociology and Anthropology Association from 1987 to 1990 and Social Science Federation of Canada from 1990 to 1993. From 1997 to 2002, Stebbins was board director of the World Leisure and Recreation Association. He became a senior fellow of the World Leisure Academy and vice-president of Research Committee 13 (Sociology of Leisure) at the International Sociological Association in 2010.

He was invited by the UK-based Leisure Studies Association to author the Leisure Reflections series, a collection of essays exploring diverse aspects of leisure. These essays provide insights into his theoretical and practical work, including the Serious Leisure Perspective.

=== Research ===
Stebbins conducted extensive qualitative research on humor, work, and leisure. Most of his work in leisure studies has centered on the serious leisure perspective (SLP), which is a term he coined in 1982 and elaborated on in 2007. The SLP framework has been widely adopted in leisure studies, providing insights into how individuals pursue structured and fulfilling leisure activities.

A common subfield of his research is amateur musicians. Stebbins authored an article in 1969 about jazz musicians and role distance behavior. In 1978, Stebbins researched the creation of high culture and the role of American amateur musicians, proposing a new method to analyze high culture. His work has also delved into other leisure pursuits, such as stand-up comedy and barbershop singing, demonstrating the diverse applications of his theories.

Stebbins authored more than 60 books and monographs. In 1971, he published Commitment to Deviance: The Nonprofessional Criminal in the Community which was recommended in Social Forces to “professions which deal with the problems of publicly labeled deviants.” Stebbins published Amateurs: On the Margin Between Work and Leisure in 1979; Marianne Gosztonyi Ainley writes for Isis that it “offers useful definitions for amateurs and professionals." In 1991, Lori V. Morris reviewed Stebbins' book The Laugh-Makers: Stand-Up Comedy as Art, Business, and Life-Style, writing: “Anyone with a fan's curiosity about comedians would likely find this book interesting.” In 1996, Stebbins published The Barbershop Singer: Inside the Social World of a Musical Hobby. Stan Parker of the University of Brighton called the book “short but highly readable."

In The Serious Leisure Perspective (2020), Stebbins provides a synthesis of the 47 years of work on the SLP. A website hosting information on the SLP was created in 2006 by Stebbins in collaboration with Jenna Hartel.

== Serious leisure perspective ==
From 1973, Stebbins made contributions to the field of leisure studies, particularly through his development of the Serious Leisure Perspective (SLP). This conceptual framework emerged from his field research on amateurs across various activities, such as music, theater, sports, and entertainment. The SLP provides a grounded theory of leisure, categorizing it into serious, casual, and project-based types. Stebbins' work has been foundational in organizing leisure studies in a manner akin to the classification of species in biology, offering an interdisciplinary and comprehensive approach to understanding free-time activities.

Stebbins was elected a Fellow of the Royal Society of Canada for his contributions to leisure research. His work is widely shared through seriousleisure.net, founded in 2006, which hosts over 3,500 scholarly references on the SLP across fields like aging, tourism, and therapeutic recreation.

His books have been published in multiple languages, and articles translated into Russian, Italian, French, and others. A key achievement is the Serious Leisure Inventory and Measure (SLIM) (2008), a widely validated tool for studying serious leisure, now used internationally to assess volunteerism, tourism participation, and leisure crafting.

== Death ==
Stebbins died on May 4, 2026, at the age of 87.

== Selected publications ==
- Exploratory Research in the Social Sciences. Sage, 2001.
- Amateurs, Professionals, and Serious Leisure. McGill-Queen's Press-MQUP, 1992.
- Serious Leisure: A Perspective for Our Time. Transaction Publishers, 2007.
- "Serious Leisure: A Conceptual Statement." Pacific Sociological Review, 25(2), 251–272, 1982.
- "Casual Leisure: A Conceptual Statement." Leisure Studies, 16(1), 17–25, 1997.
- "Cultural Tourism as Serious Leisure." Annals of Tourism Research, 1996.
- Experiencing Fieldwork: An Inside View of Qualitative Research. Co-authored with W. Shaffir. Sage Publications, 1990.
- "Volunteering: A Serious Leisure Perspective." Nonprofit and Voluntary Sector Quarterly, 25(2), 211–224, 1996.
- "Serious Leisure." Society, 38(4), 53, 2001.
- New Directions in the Theory and Research of Serious Leisure. 2001.
- Careers in Serious Leisure: From Dabbler to Devotee in Search of Fulfillment. Palgrave Macmillan, 2014.
- Occupational Devotion: Finding Satisfaction and Fullment at Work. Anthem Press, 2022.

== Awards and honors ==
- 1996 – Elected Fellow, Academy of Leisure Sciences
- 1996 – Distinguished Research Award, University of Calgary
- 1997 – Outstanding Contribution Award, Canadian Sociology and Anthropology Association
- 1999 – Elected Fellow, Royal Society of Canada
- 2003 – Marguerite Dentinger Prize, Association canadienne-française de l'Alberta
- 2010 – Elected Senior Fellow, World Leisure Academy
- 2019 – Honorary Lifetime Member, Leisure Studies Association
- 2022 – Best Book Prize (for The Serious Leisure Perspective), Leisure Studies Association
