= CKJX-FM =

Radio station in Olds, Alberta

- Olds, Alberta; Canada
- Broadcast area: Central Alberta
- Frequency: 104.5 MHz
- Branding: 104.5 The Goat

Programming
- Language: English
- Format: Mainstream rock

Ownership
- Owner: Vista Radio
- Sister stations: CKLJ-FM

History
- First air date: May 30, 2008

Technical information
- Class: B
- ERP: 35,000 watts
- HAAT: 124.7 metres (409 ft)
- Transmitter coordinates: 51.795°N 114.102°W

Links
- Webcast: Listen Live
- Website: mymountainviewnow.com

CKJX-FM (104.5 FM, "104.5 The GOAT") is a radio station in Olds, Alberta. Owned by Vista Radio, it broadcasts a mainstream rock format.

== History ==
The station owned by CAB-K Broadcasting Ltd. received CRTC approval on June 4, 2007 to operate a new FM radio station at Olds, Alberta.

CKJX began broadcasting on May 30, 2008 playing rock music from the 1960s to today.

In September 2023, Vista Radio announced its intent to acquire CAB-K Broadcasting. It switched to Vista's standard rock brand The GOAT in January 2025.
