= Prespatou =

Coordinates: 56.9500°N 120.9950°W

Location of Prespatou in British Columbia

Prespatou is a settlement in British Columbia. It is located approximately 100 km north of Fort St John. It is a community with the majority of the residents being Plautdietsch-speaking Mennonites. It has a convenience store, gas station, and a public school, Prespatou Elementary-Secondary, that provides instruction to 320 students from kindergarten to grade 12. The community is served by School District 60: Peace River North. There is minimal access into Prespatou, with only a single road (aptly named, Prespatou Road) giving access from Fort St. John and other rural communities, which are largely accessible through Cole Avenue.

In 2020, there were great concerns relating to COVID-19 in the community.

== Census ==
In the 2016 census, there was 346 individuals living in the community. In the 2021 census, there was 298 individuals living in the community. This represents a change of -13%. The community is bilingual and speaks German and English.
