= CKLM-FM =

Radio station in Lloydminster, Alberta

Coordinates: 53°11′35″N 110°20′58″W

- Lloydminster, Alberta/Saskatchewan; Canada
- Frequency: 106.1 MHz
- Branding: 106.1 The Goat

Programming
- Format: Active rock

Ownership
- Owner: Vista Radio

History
- First air date: May 18, 2001
- Call sign meaning: LM for Lloydminster

Technical information
- Class: C1
- ERP: 43 kW vertical polarization 100 kW horizontal polarization
- HAAT: 181.9 metres (597 ft)

Links
- Website: mylloydminsternow.com/the-goat

CKLM-FM is a Canadian radio station, broadcasting at 106.1 FM in Lloydminster, Alberta/Saskatchewan. The station airs an active rock format branded as 106.1 The Goat.

Licensed in 2000 to Peace River Broadcasting, the station was acquired by Stewart and Anita Dent (shareholders of Peace River Broadcasting) in 2001 through their numbered holding company 912038 Alberta Ltd.

The station launched on May 18, 2001. The station added a rebroadcaster at Bonnyville on August 22, 2003, which subsequently became an independent station, CFNA, on September 28, 2007. The Canadian Radio-television and Telecommunications Commission approved the stations' sale to the Vista Broadcast Group on November 21, 2008.
