= CKLJ-FM =

Radio station in Olds, Alberta

- Olds, Alberta; Canada
- Broadcast area: Central Alberta
- Frequency: 96.5 MHz
- Branding: 96.5 The Ranch

Programming
- Language: English
- Format: Country

Ownership
- Owner: Vista Radio
- Sister stations: CKJX-FM

History
- First air date: February 4, 2004
- Former frequencies: 97.7 MHz (2004–2007)

Technical information
- Class: B
- ERP: 35,000 watts
- HAAT: 124.5 metres (408 ft)
- Transmitter coordinates: 51°45′29″N 114°05′41″W

Links
- Website: mymountainviewnow.com

CKLJ-FM (96.5 FM, "96.5 The Ranch") is a radio station in Olds, Alberta. Owned by Vista Radio, it broadcasts a country music format.

== History ==
In July 2003, CAB-K Broadcasting received approval for a new FM country station in Olds, Alberta.

The station originally began broadcasting on February 2, 2004 at 97.7 FM. In 2007, the CRTC approved technical changes to increase the height and power of CKLJ's transmitter, and re-locate the station to 96.5 FM. CAB-K argued that the station was facing reception difficulties in areas west of Olds due to its hilly terrain, and that the changes would improve its ability to serve its primary signal contour. Rawlco Communications concurrently received approval to move its newly-approved Calgary radio station from 100.3 to 97.7.

In September 2023, CAB-K Broadcasting was sold to Vista Radio, after which it switched to Vista's standard country music brand The Ranch.
