= CJOK-FM =

Radio station in Fort McMurray, Alberta

Coordinates: 56°41′16″N 111°19′59″W

- Fort McMurray, Alberta; Canada
- Frequency: 93.3 MHz
- Branding: Country 93.3

Programming
- Format: Country
- Affiliations: Fort McMurray Oil Barons

Ownership
- Owner: Rogers Radio; (Rogers Media, Inc.)
- Sister stations: CKYX-FM

History
- First air date: January 1, 1973
- Former frequencies: 1230 kHz (1973–1998)

Technical information
- Class: B
- ERP: 43,500 watts
- HAAT: 123 metres (404 ft)

Links
- Webcast: Listen Live
- Website: www.country933.com

CJOK-FM (93.3 MHz) is a radio station in Fort McMurray, Alberta, Canada, with a country format branded on-air as Country 93.3. The station is owned by Rogers Radio, a division of Rogers Sports & Media.

CJOK went on the air January 1, 1973, as the first radio station in Fort McMurray. It was founded by Roger Charest and was the namesake for his broadcast company, the OK Radio Group. In 1985, a sister FM station, CKYX-FM, was established. CJOK moved to FM in August 1997 and was purchased by Rogers in 2006.

== History ==
In 1972, Roger Charest, an announcer at CHQT in Edmonton, decided to file for the first radio licence to serve Fort McMurray, at the time a small town with no local stations in the years before the Athabasca oil sands boomed. He contacted a friend of his, Stu Morton, who at first didn't know where the town was. The two went into partnership, and CJOK began broadcasting as an AM station on 1230 kHz at 12:01 a.m. on January 1, 1973, New Year's Day; the first song played was "I Can See Clearly Now" by Johnny Nash. The station met with tremendous local interest; Charest recalled nonstop phone calls and a feeling of "jubilation" in town. CJOK was among the first small-town radio stations in Alberta. With the exception of the Peace River area, the majority of the stations in the province were in cities, possibly because the flat terrain allowed those signals to travel much further than otherwise; in contrast, mountainous British Columbia had a proliferation of rural stations. Charest would later state that he founded CJOK "five years too soon", before the tar sands boom took hold in town.

After the success of CJOK, Charest and Morton received licences from the Canadian Radio-Television Commission (now the Canadian Radio-television and Telecommunications Commission, CRTC) to launch CFOK in Westlock and CIOK in St. Paul. Charest sold all of his interest in OK Radio Group to Humford Development in 1978 but bought it back in 1981, with Charest and Morton co-owning the OK Radio Group and Edmonton ethnic radio station CKER. In the wake of the repurchase, CJOK applied to the CRTC to change frequencies to the lower 550 kHz with 10,000 watts instead of 1,000, expanding coverage. The station also anticipated to improve coverage at the oil sands plants and within buildings in the city. However, an intervention by adjacent-channel CBK, the CBC station in Saskatchewan, stalled approval until April 1984. Ultimately, the frequency change proposal was abandoned, having become unnecessary because the projected Alsands plant and population boom to support the increased coverage never materialized.

In March 1985, OK Radio Group built rock-formatted FM station CKYX-FM; CJOK removed rock music from its middle of the road format at that time. The station received a short 18-month licence renewal from the CRTC, its most severe penalty short of revocation, in 1987 because it failed to play enough Canadian content; CJOK fell short because four songs sung by Anne Murray failed to meet two of the four MAPL (music, artist, production, lyrics) requirements to qualify. By 1989, CJOK was airing a country music format.

CJOK applied in August 1997 to move to the FM band, citing the inadequacy of its signal as conceived in the early 1970s to serve the larger Fort McMurray urban area. The proposal required the CRTC to issue a waiver of its rule that prevented one group from owning more than one FM station in the same market; in December, the commission granted this waiver and approved the FM conversion, satisfied with OK Radio's commitment to retain the country format and that the arrangement would "provide a better quality service to the Fort McMurray population". The conversion was made in August 1998.

In 2006, Charest and Morton—now in their 60s—announced their retirement and put the OK Radio Group on the market. It now consisted of the Fort McMurray stations as well as outlets in Edmonton, Grande Prairie, and Victoria, British Columbia. Rogers Communications acquired the seven stations for $39.6 million, marking its entry into the three Alberta markets served by the OK Radio Group.

In October 2025, Rogers laid off local staff and closed the studios in Fort McMurray due to lack of revenue and staffing difficulties. Remaining local talent continued to present programming remotely from home studios or other arrangements.

== Rebroadcaster ==
In 1994, CJOK was authorized to add an FM rebroadcaster at 95.7 MHz at the Suncor plant on Tar Island. The rebroadcaster was switched to repeating CKYX-FM in 2005.
