= Day spa =

Health facility

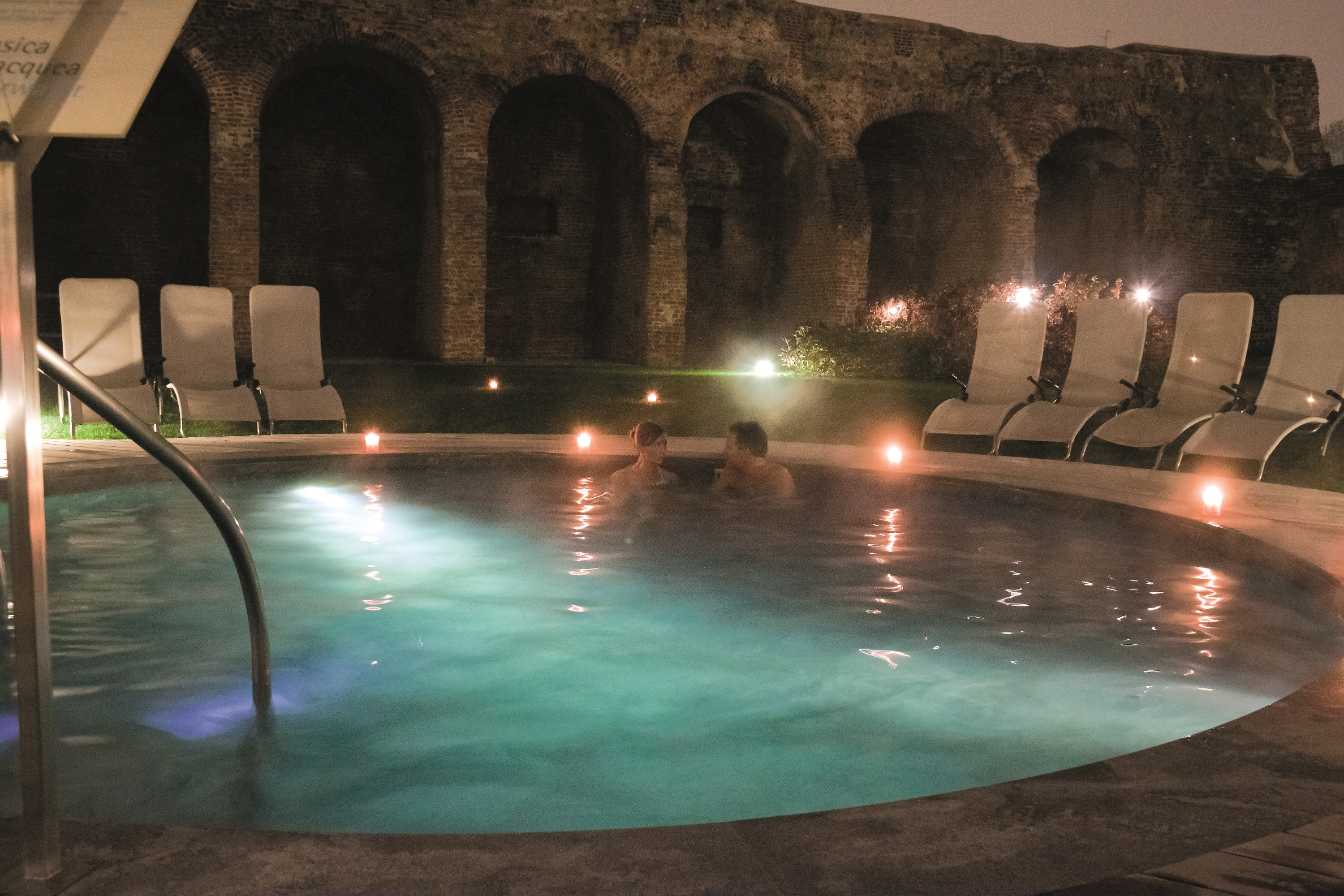
A day spa in Milan, Italy

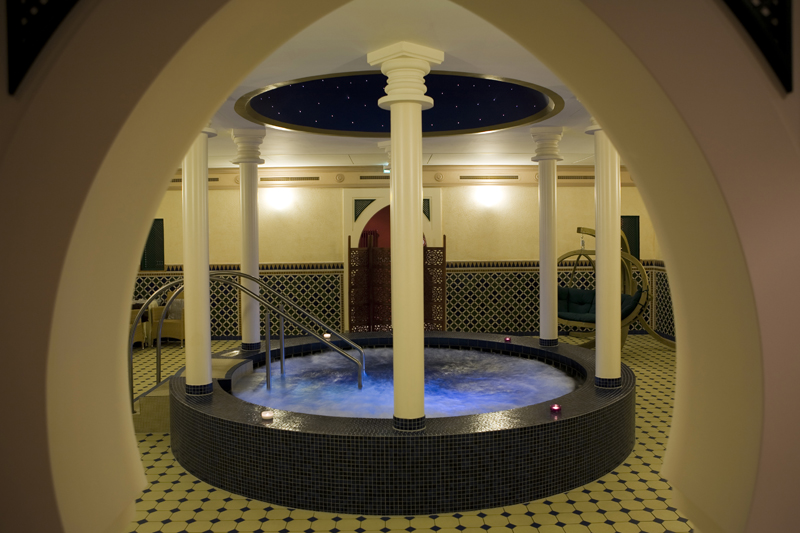
A day spa in Wrocław, Poland

A day spa is a business that promotes itself as providing a variety of services for improving health, beauty, and relaxation through personal care treatments such as massages and facials. The number of day spas in the US almost doubled in the two years from 2002 to 2004, to 8,734, according to the International Spa Association, and by 2020 there were 21,560 spas across the United States, according to Statista.

== Differences from beauty salon and destination spa ==
A day spa is different from a beauty salon, in that it contains facilities such as a sauna, pool, steam room, or whirlpool that guests may use in addition to their treatment.

A day spa is also different from a destination spa, as no overnight accommodation is provided. In contrast, a destination spa offers similar services integrated into packages that may include diet, exercise programs, instruction on wellness, life coaching, yoga, tai chi, and accommodations in which participants reside for the duration of their stay. It may also function as a day spa, if it allows day access to patrons who are not guests of the resort.

== Medspa ==
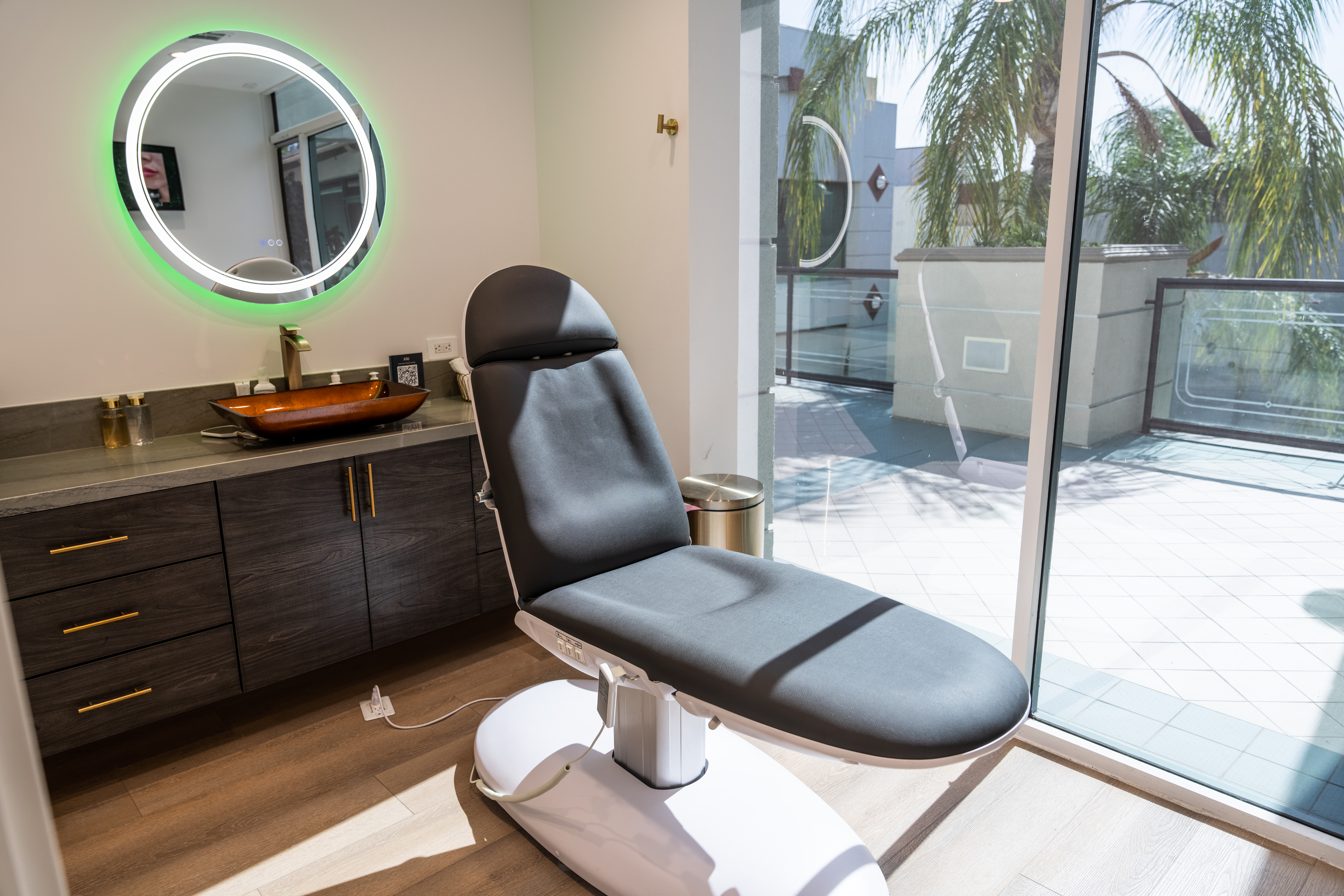
A medspa in Los Angeles, California

A medspa, also known as a medical spa, is a spa that provides the client with medical spa services. It is a combination of a medical clinic and a traditional spa, providing spa and specialized medical treatments, with an overall focus on holistic health, wellness, and anti-aging services. Medspas specialize in non-surgical aesthetic services, including laser hair removal and medical-grade skin therapies. Licensed medical professionals operate them, but generally look and feel like a boutique personal service. As of 2022, the most popular procedures at medspas, according to the American Med Spa Association, are: chemical peels, aesthetician services, Botox and filler injections, microdermabrasion, photo-facial pulsed light, skin tightening, body contouring, laser skin resurfacing, medical consultations with a licensed medical doctor, and radiofrequency.

=== Growth in the United States ===
The first medspa appeared around 1996. In 2002, the year Botox was approved for cosmetic use by the Food and Drug Administration, there were approximately 25 medspas in the US, according to the International Medical Spa Association. By 2004, there were approximately 500 medspas in the US, mostly cosmetic and run by dermatologists or plastic surgeons, though an increasing number were beginning to identify as wellness centers.

Between 2007 and 2008, the number of medspas increased by 85%, according to the International Medical Spa Association, with the types of procedures performed at medspas also increasing. In 2010, there were 1,600 medspas in the US generating $1.1 billion in revenue ($700,000 per medspa on average); by 2018, over 5,000 medspas were generating $7–8 billion in revenue ($1.4 million per medspa on average). The 2018 profit margin for medspas was 29%.

In 2022, the United States accounted for 37.7% of the global medspa market, valued at $16.4 billion, and projected to reach $41 billion by the end of 2029, according to Data Bridge Market Research. The surge is credited to technological advances, evolving consumer preferences, and the proliferation of business conducted through video calling. By the end of 2022, there were 8,841 registered medical spas in the US, employing more than 70,000 people, with women making up 88% of medspa patients, according to the American Med Spa Association.

The number of medical spas in the United States offering services such as laser hair removal, skin resurfacing, and various other treatments classified as medical procedures has risen significantly in recent years. The industry's expansion is evident in its growth from approximately 1,600 locations in 2010 to more than 10,000 by 2023. During this period, the average annual revenue per medical spa reached $1.4 million, contributing to an overall industry revenue of $15.8 billion as of 2023.

== See also ==
- Spa
