= CKKX-FM =

Radio station in Peace River, Alberta

Coordinates: 56°14′11″N 117°15′50″W

- Peace River, Alberta; Canada
- Broadcast area: Peace River; High Level; Fairview; High Prairie; Manning
- Frequency: 106.1 MHz (FM)
- Branding: Kix FM

Programming
- Format: CHR/Top 40

Ownership
- Owner: Peace River Broadcasting

History
- First air date: July 1997 (licensed)

Technical information
- Class: A
- ERP: 2.5 kWs
- HAAT: 155.2 meters (509 ft)

Links
- Webcast: Listen Live
- Website: kix.fm

CKKX-FM is a Canadian radio station that broadcasts a CHR/Top 40 format at 106.1 FM in Peace River, Alberta and has rebroadcasters in High Level, Fairview, High Prairie, and Manning. The station is branded as Kix FM and is owned by Peace River Broadcasting.

The station received approval by the Canadian Radio-television and Telecommunications Commission (CRTC) in 1997.

== Rebroadcasters ==
Rebroadcasters of CKKX-FM
City of licence	Identifier	Frequency	Power	RECNet	CRTC Decision
Manning	CKKX-FM-1	92.1 FM	950 watts	Query	2005-289
High Level	CFKX-FM	106.1 FM	34,000 watts	Query	98-496
High Prairie	CJHP-FM	106.9 FM	2,700 watts	Query	2003-90
Fairview	CKKF-FM	106.9 FM	930 watts	Query	
