= CKPA-FM =

Radio station in Olds, Alberta

- Ponoka, Alberta; Canada
- Broadcast area: Central Alberta
- Frequency: 89.7 MHz (FM)
- Branding: 89.7 The One

Programming
- Language: English
- Format: Country

Ownership
- Owner: Blackgold Broadcasting Ltd.

History
- First air date: 2021

Technical information
- Class: B1
- ERP: 10,000 watts

CKPA-FM is a Canadian radio station that broadcasts a country format at 89.7 FM in Ponoka, Alberta. The station is branded as 89.7 The One and is owned by Blackgold Broadcasting Ltd.

== History ==
Blackgold received approval from the CRTC to operate a new English-language commercial FM radio station in Ponoka on September 2, 2016.
