= CFNA-FM =

Radio station in Bonnyville, Alberta, Canada

Coordinates: 54°10′55″N 110°51′59″W

- Bonnyville, Alberta; Canada
- Frequency: 99.7 MHz
- Branding: 99.7 The Ranch

Programming
- Format: Country

Ownership
- Owner: Vista Radio

History
- First air date: September 28, 2007
- Call sign meaning: Coming From Northern Alberta

Technical information
- Class: B
- ERP: 22 kWs vertical 50 kWs horizontal
- HAAT: 121.9 metres (400 ft)

Links
- Website: mylakelandnow.com/country-fm

CFNA-FM is a Canadian radio station, broadcasting at 99.7 FM in Bonnyville, Alberta. The station airs a country format branded as 99.7 The Ranch.

The station was originally launched in 2003 by 912038 Alberta Ltd. as a rebroadcaster of CKLM-FM in Lloydminster. It officially became a separate station with its own studios and program schedule on September 28, 2007. The station originally had an active rock format. The station was sold to Vista Broadcast Group on November 21, 2008. The music format was changed to country by Vista Radio in early 2009, when the name was changed from The Goat to The Wolf. The name was changed again in 2014 to 99 Country FM.
