= CKYX-FM =

Radio station in Fort McMurray, Alberta

Coordinates: 56°41′16″N 111°19′59″W

- Fort McMurray, Alberta; Canada
- Broadcast area: Fort McMurray
- Frequency: 97.9 MHz
- Branding: 97.9 Rock

Programming
- Format: classic rock

Ownership
- Owner: Rogers Radio; (Rogers Media, Inc.)
- Sister stations: CJOK-FM

History
- First air date: March 20, 1985
- Call sign meaning: "Kyx" (former branding)

Technical information
- Class: B
- ERP: 43,500 watts
- HAAT: 123 metres (404 ft)

Links
- Webcast: Listen live
- Website: 979rock.ca

CKYX-FM (97.9 MHz) is a radio station serving Fort McMurray, Alberta with a classic rock format branded as 97.9 Rock. The station received approval by the CRTC in 1984 to broadcast at 97.9 MHz.

CKYX also has a rebroadcaster on Tar Island at 95.7 MHz.

As of October 2025, Rogers laid off local staff and closed their studios in Fort McMurray due to lack of revenue and staffing difficulties https://broadcastdialogue.com/rogers-sports-media-moves-to-remote-ops-model-for-smaller-market-radio-stations/
