= CKHL-FM =

Radio station in High Level, Alberta

Coordinates: 58°40′51″N 117°24′41″W

- High Level, Alberta; Canada
- Broadcast area: High Level
- Frequency: 102.1 MHz (FM)
- Branding: River Country

Programming
- Format: Country

Ownership
- Owner: Peace River Broadcasting

History
- First air date: 1988
- Former frequencies: 530 kHz (AM) (1988–1999)
- Call sign meaning: CK High Level (broadcast area)

Technical information
- Class: C1
- ERP: 8,100 watts (average); 34,000 watts (peak)
- HAAT: 316 meters (1,037 ft)

Links
- Webcast: Listen Live
- Website: rivercountry.fm

CKHL-FM is a Canadian radio station, that broadcasts a country format branded as River Country at 102.1 FM in High Level, Alberta, Canada.

The station originally began broadcasting in 1988 on the frequency 530 AM, an unusual frequency for a commercial radio station, and was also used to rebroadcast programs of CKYL in Peace River, until it moved to its current FM frequency in 1999. The station was later authorized to delete its former AM transmitter.

The station is owned by Peace River Broadcasting and is also heard on a number of frequencies throughout the Peace.

In 2018, YL Country became River Country.

In April 2018, CKHL received CRTC approval to decrease power from 34,000 to 29,000 watts, and to raise antenna height.

== See also ==
- CKYL-FM
