= CKYL-FM =

Radio station in Peace River, Alberta, Canada

- Peace River, Alberta; Canada
- Broadcast area: Northern Alberta
- Frequency: 94.9 MHz (FM)
- Branding: River Country

Programming
- Format: Country
- Affiliations: Premiere Networks; Westwood One

Ownership
- Owner: Peace River Broadcasting

History
- First air date: November 1, 1954
- Former frequencies: 630 kHz (AM); 610 kHz

Technical information
- Class: C1
- ERP: 100,000 watts vertical polarization only
- HAAT: 219.9 meters (721 ft)
- Transmitter coordinates: 56°21′39″N 117°21′31″W

Links
- Webcast: Listen Live
- Website: rivercountry.fm

CKYL-FM is a Canadian radio station that broadcasts a country format at 94.9 FM in Peace River, Alberta and also several different other frequencies on the FM dial. The station is branded as River Country and is owned by Peace River Broadcasting.

== History ==
CKYL originally began broadcasting in 1954 at 630 AM, until it moved to 610 kHz in the late 1950s or early 60s. The station is also heard via a number of FM translators in various communities of northern Alberta. CKYL was a Class B regional station broadcasting with a power of 10,000 watts daytime and nighttime.

== Rebroadcasters ==
Rebroadcasters of CKYL-FM
City of licence	Identifier	Frequency	Power	Class	RECNet	CRTC Decision
Fairview	CKYL-FM-3	88.5 FM	820 watts	A	Query	
High Prairie	CKYL-FM-2	92.1 FM	1,500 watts	A	Query	2006-310
La Crete	CKLA-FM	92.1 FM	27 watts	LP	Query	95–248
Rainbow Lake	CJRA-FM	93.1 FM	49 watts	LP	Query	97-526
Saddle Hills County	CKYL-FM-5	88.9 FM	2,500 watts	B1	Query	
Valleyview	CKYL-FM-4	88.7 FM	1,400 watts	A	Query	
Manning	CKYL-FM-6	93.3 FM	880 watts	A	Query	2011-649

On July 24, 2006, the Peace River Broadcasting received CRTC approval to operate a new nested FM transmitter at Peace River, along with other new FM transmitters for communities in High Prairie, Fairview, Valleyview and Saddle Hills, Alberta.

== History ==
On October 17, 2011, Peace River Broadcasting received CRTC approval to operate a new transmitter at Manning, Alberta on 93.3 MHz.

On June 20, 2017, the CRTC approved Peace River Broadcasting Corporation Ltd. (Peace River Broadcasting) to operate an English-language FM commercial radio programming undertaking in Peace River, Alberta. This replaced its AM commercial radio programming undertaking CKYL Peace River and its rebroadcasting transmitter CKYL-FM-1 Peace River. The new FM station operates at 94.9 MHz (channel 235C1), the frequency currently used by the rebroadcasting transmitter CKYL-FM-1, with an average effective radiated power (ERP) of 62,000 watts (maximum ERP of 100,000 watts, and an effective height of antenna above average terrain of 219.9 metres).

In March 2018, CKYL officially moved from AM 610 to its nested FM frequency of 94.9 MHz as CKYL-FM. CKYL 610 AM left the air, after its simulcast period with 94.9 FM came to an end in May. In October 2018, CKYL changed their branding from YL Country to River Country.

== Former logos ==
YL Country logo used for CKYL until 2018

== See also ==
- CKHL-FM
