= CIBW-FM =

Radio station in Drayton Valley, Alberta

- Drayton Valley, Alberta; Canada
- Frequency: 92.9 MHz
- Branding: Big West Country

Programming
- Format: Country

Ownership
- Owner: Jim Pattison Group

History
- First air date: 1994
- Call sign meaning: "Big West"

Technical information
- Class: B
- ERP: 22,000 watts vertical 50,000 watts horizontal
- HAAT: 116.3 metres (382 ft)
- Transmitter coordinates: 53.2394°N 115.129°W

Links
- Webcast: Listen Live
- Website: bigwestcountry.ca

CIBW-FM is a Canadian radio station that broadcasts a country format at 92.9 FM in Drayton Valley, Alberta. The station is branded as Big West Country and is owned by the Jim Pattison Broadcast Group.

The station was given approval by the CRTC on December 8, 1993.

On August 26, 2009, CIBW-FM received CRTC approval to increase their effective radiated power.
