= CJPR-FM =

Radio station in Blairmore, Alberta

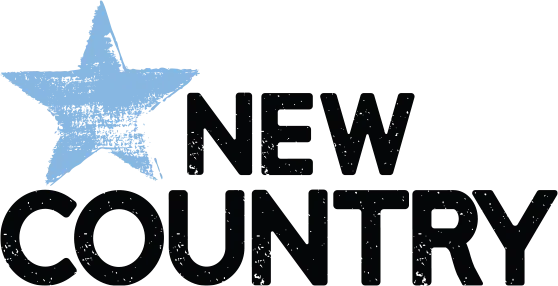
- Blairmore, Alberta; Canada
- Frequency: 94.9 MHz
- Branding: New Country

Programming
- Format: Country
- Affiliations: Westwood One

Ownership
- Owner: Stingray Group

History
- First air date: 1972
- Former frequencies: 1490 kHz (1972–2002)

Technical information
- Class: A
- ERP: 760 watts (horizontal polarization)
- HAAT: -324.7 metres
- Transmitter coordinates: 49°38′2.04″N 114°29′34.80″W

Links
- Webcast: Listen Live
- Website: newcountrysouthwest.ca

CJPR-FM (94.9 MHz) is a Canadian radio station that broadcasts a country format under its on-air branding as New Country in Blairmore, Alberta. The station was owned & operated by Newcap Radio until they were bought out by Stingray Digital.

CJPR originally began broadcasting at 1490 AM in 1972, until it moved to 94.9 FM in 2002.

On May 16, 2008, CJPR applied to the CRTC to add a transmitter at Pincher Creek, Alberta. The station was given approval on July 28, 2008 to operate a rebroadcaster in Pincher Creek at 92.7 FM (CJPV-FM).

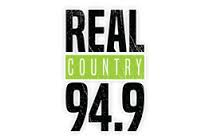
Previous logo

In November 2016, CJPR rebranded under the Real Country brand, as with other Newcap-owned country stations in Alberta.

On March 4, 2024, CJPR rebranded to New Country to match the company’s other country music stations.

== Rebroadcasters ==
Rebroadcasters of CJPR-FM
City of licence	Identifier	Frequency	Power	Class
Elkford, British Columbia	CJEV	1340 AM	50 watts	LP
Pincher Creek, Alberta	CJPV-FM	92.7 FM	6,000 watts	A
