= CJGY-FM =

Radio station in Grande Prairie

Coordinates: 55°14′30″N 118°33′30″W

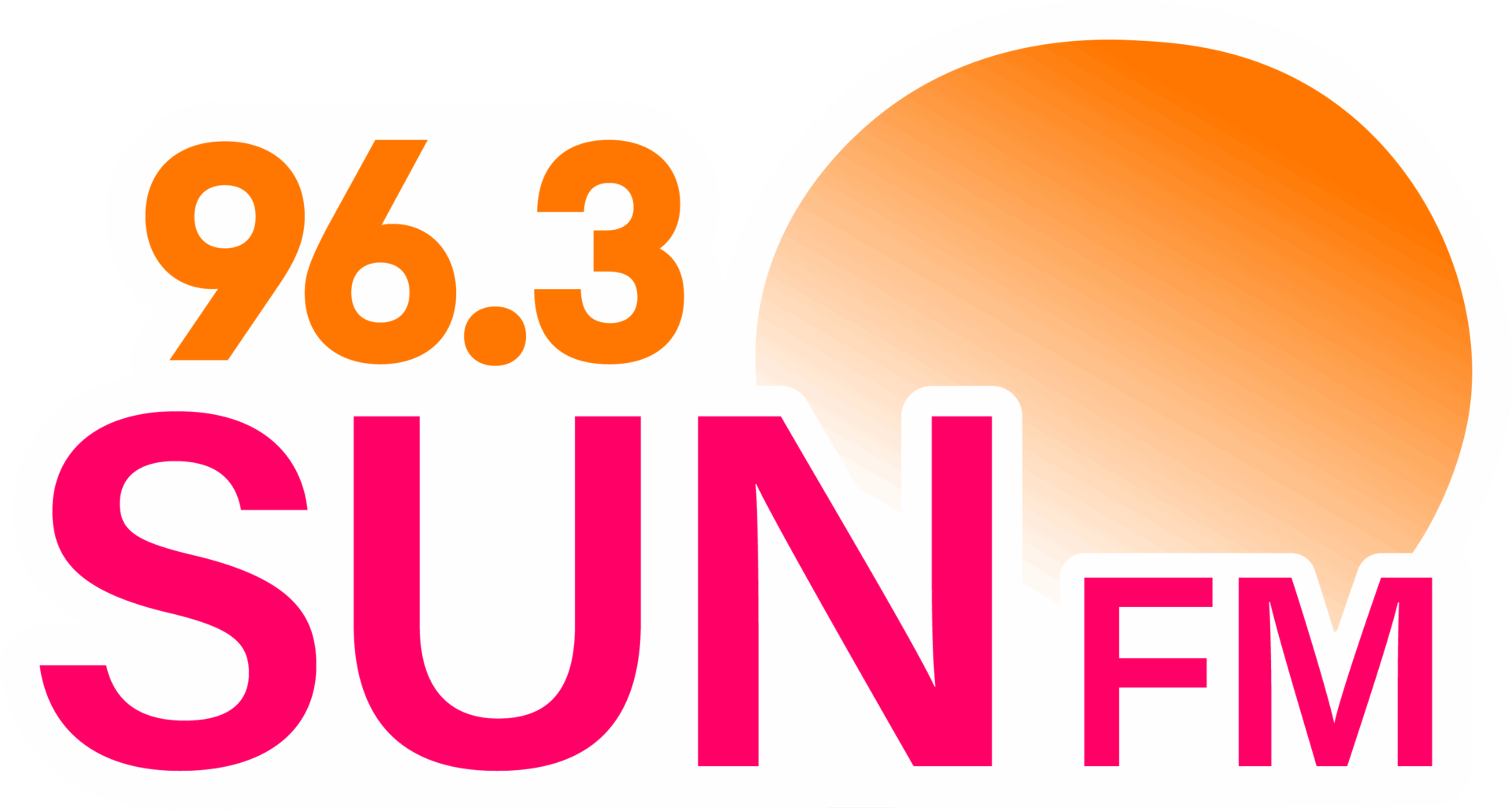
- Grande Prairie, Alberta; Canada
- Frequency: 96.3 MHz (FM)
- Branding: 96.3 Sun FM

Programming
- Format: Contemporary hit radio

Ownership
- Owner: Vista Radio
- Sister stations: CFRI-FM

History
- First air date: December 3, 2007

Technical information
- Licensing authority: CRTC
- Class: C1
- ERP: 30 kW vertical; 70 kW horizontal
- HAAT: 206 metres (676 ft)

Links
- Website: www.mygrandeprairienow.com

CJGY-FM (96.3 FM, "96.3 Sun FM") is a radio station in Grande Prairie, Alberta, Canada. Owned by Vista Radio, it broadcasts a contemporary hit radio format serving the Grand Prairie area, as well as the cities of Dawson Creek and Fort St. John, British Columbia via rebroadcasters.

== History ==
The station received approval in 2006 and launched on December 3, 2007, as 96.3 Shine FM. In 2012, the station was transferred to Grande Prairie Radio, Ltd., owned by Touch Canada Broadcasting co-partner Peter Teichroeb. In 2013, the station re-branded as 96.3 Reach FM, with no change in format.

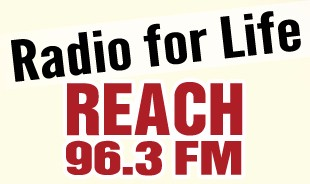
Logo as "96.3 Reach FM", used from 2013–2026

On January 27, 2016, the station received CRTC approval to add new FM transmitters in Dawson Creek (96.7 MHz) and Fort St. John, British Columbia (97.1 MHz). The transmitters, which commenced broadcasting in Summer 2016, repeat the same programs as CJGY-FM, but with local inserts, including news, weather and community information. In 2017, the station was sold to Golden West Broadcasting.

In 2023, Golden West requested a license amendment that would allow the station to broadcast a format based on popular music, citing that the Christian format had a small audience and was not profitable. The amendment was approved by the CRTC in January 2024.

On May 7, 2025, Vista Radio filed an application with the CRTC to acquire CJGY from Golden West; the sale was approved on October 31, 2025. The sale made CJGY a sister station to CFRI-FM. On January 5, 2026, the station flipped to contemporary hit radio as 96.3 Sun FM, with CFRI concurrently flipping from CHR to mainstream rock.

== Rebroadcasters ==
CJGY-FM has the following rebroadcasters:

Rebroadcasters of CJGY-FM
City of licence	Identifier	Frequency	RECNet	CRTC Decision
Dawson Creek, British Columbia	CJGY-FM-2	96.7 FM	Query	
Fort St. John, British Columbia	CJGY-FM-1	97.1 FM	Query	
