= CKBD-FM =

Radio station in Lethbridge

- Lethbridge, Alberta; Canada
- Broadcast area: Lethbridge County
- Frequency: 98.1 MHz
- Branding: 98.1 The Ranch

Programming
- Format: Country

Ownership
- Owner: Vista Radio
- Sister stations: CJOC-FM

History
- First air date: December 2000
- Former call signs: CJTS-FM (2000–2007); CKVN-FM (2007–2014)
- Former frequencies: 97.1 MHz (2000–2007)
- Call sign meaning: BD for "Bridge", former brand

Technical information
- Class: B
- ERP: 91 kW
- HAAT: 184.5 metres (605 ft)

Links
- Website: mylethbridgenow.com

CKBD-FM (98.1 FM, 98.1 The Ranch) is a radio station in Lethbridge, Alberta. Owned by Vista Radio, it broadcasts a country format.

== History ==
The station signed on in December 2000 as CJTS-FM, a Christian station broadcasting at 97.1 FM, initially owned by Spirit Broadcasting. In 2006, the station was sold to Golden West Broadcasting. In addition, the CRTC approved a re-location to 98.1 FM, and an increase in power to 20,000 watts. Golden West stated that the owner's health, as well as the station's financial performance, were factors in the decision to sell. In April 2007, the station switched frequencies and adopted the new call letters CKVN-FM. The station maintained its contemporary Christian music format (with branding modelled upon then-sister station CHVN-FM in Winnipeg).

In 2014, Lethbridge-based Clear Sky Radio, who owns CJOC-FM, acquired CKVN from Golden West. Clear Sky also received permission from the CRTC to remove the license conditions requiring CKVN to operate as a religious station; Clear Sky and Golden West argued that the station had accumulated financial losses under its existing Christian format. In September 2014, the station flipped to alternative rock as 98.1 The Bridge, with the new call letters CKBD-FM.

In 2017, the station segued to modern adult contemporary, still branding as The Bridge. In December 2018, Clear Sky Radio announced the sale of its three remaining stations to Vista Radio. In June 2019, both CKBD and sister station CJOC were rebranded under Vista's standard station brands, with CKBD becoming 98.1 2day FM.

Former Logo as 2DayFM 2019-2024

On February 2, 2024, CKBD-FM flipped to country as 98.1 The Ranch.
