= CFRV-FM =

Radio station in Lethbridge

- Lethbridge, Alberta; Canada
- Broadcast area: Lethbridge County
- Frequency: 107.7 MHz
- Branding: KiSS 107.7

Programming
- Format: Adult contemporary

Ownership
- Owner: Rogers Radio; (Rogers Media, Inc.)
- Sister stations: CJRX-FM

History
- First air date: August 28, 1959
- Former call signs: CHEC-FM (1959–1979); CILA (1979–1992)
- Former frequencies: 100.9 MHz (1959–1980)
- Call sign meaning: From former "The River" branding

Technical information
- Class: C
- ERP: 100,000 watts
- HAAT: 183.4 metres (602 ft)
- Transmitter coordinates: 49.696°N 112.831°W

Links
- Website: kiss1077.ca

CFRV-FM (107.7 MHz) is a radio station licensed to Lethbridge, Alberta. Owned by Rogers Radio, a division of Rogers Sports & Media, the station broadcasts an adult contemporary format branded as KiSS 107.7.

== History ==
The station first signed on the air on August 28, 1959, at 100.9 FM under its original call letters CHEC-FM. The station's call letters were changed to CILA in 1979 and increased its power to 100,000 watts. In 1980, the station moved to its current frequency. In 1992, the station adopted its current call letters. The station had a hot adult contemporary format until 2007 when the station shifted to adult contemporary, the station's format change to adult contemporary occurred around the same time CJBZ-FM shifted from adult hits to CHR/Top 40. This format change was to compete against rival station CJOC-FM.

This makes Lethbridge the largest Alberta market without a hot adult contemporary station, having been overtaken from Edmonton in February 2010, virtually the same time when CKNO-FM signed on the air. The station has since moved back to a hot AC sound. The station's branding at the time was 107.7 The River. On September 2, 2016, CFRV rebranded to KiSS 107.7, with no change in format.
