= CJOC-FM =

Radio station in Lethbridge

Coordinates: 49°40′57″N 112°55′38″W

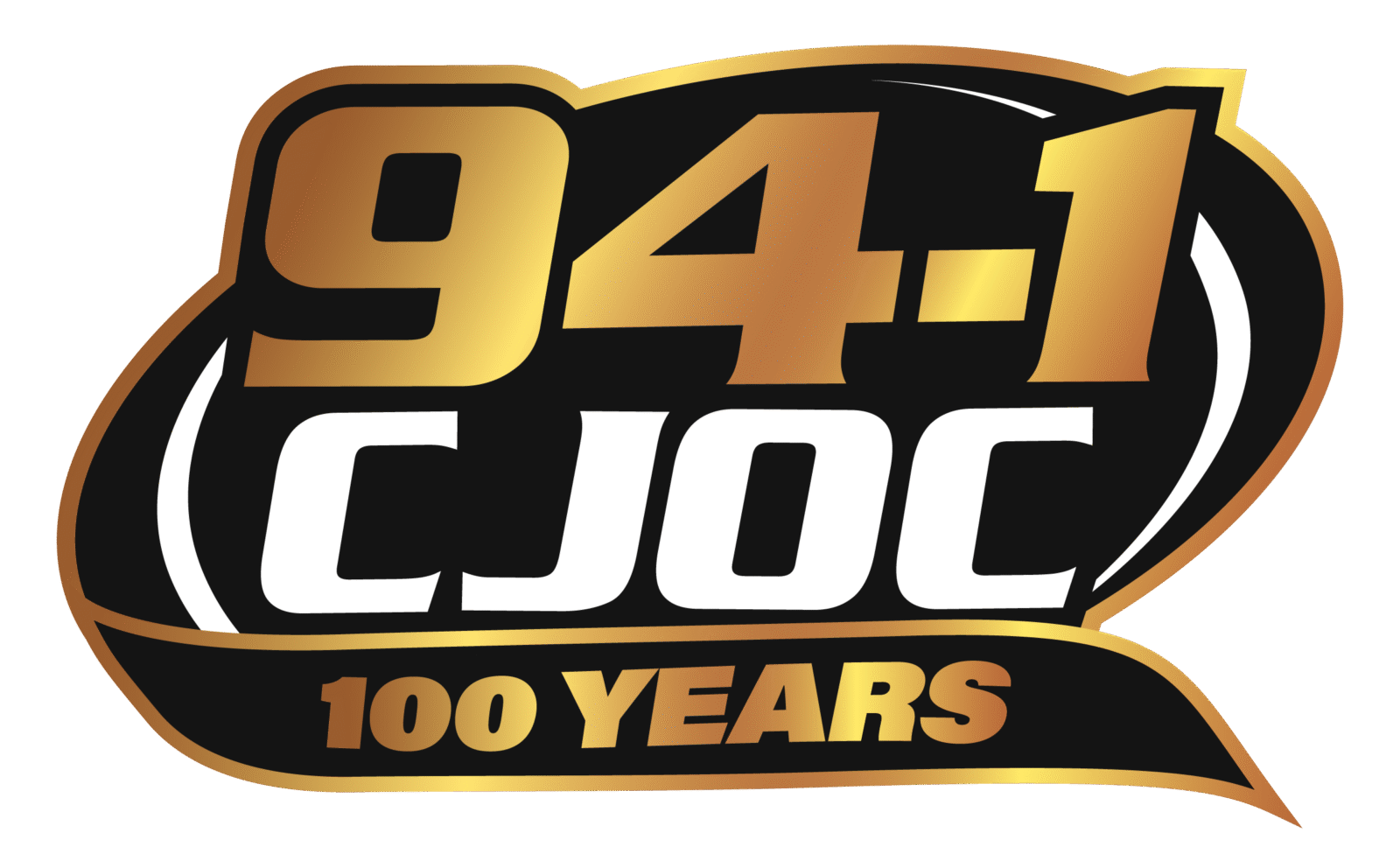
- CJOC secondary logo that used on the 100 year anniversary.
- Lethbridge, Alberta; Canada
- Broadcast area: Lethbridge County
- Frequency: 94.1 MHz
- Branding: 94.1 CJOC

Programming
- Format: Classic hits

Ownership
- Owner: Vista Radio
- Sister stations: CKBD-FM

History
- First air date: July 3, 2007
- Call sign meaning: Jock Palmer (derived from CJOC)

Technical information
- Class: C
- ERP: vertical polarization: 43,000 watts horizontal polarization: 100,000 watts
- HAAT: 155.8 metres (511 ft)

Links
- Webcast: Listen Live
- Website: mylethbridgenow.com

CJOC-FM (94.1 FM) is a radio station in Lethbridge, Alberta. Owned by Vista Radio, it broadcasts a classic hits format.

== History ==
The station was licensed by the Canadian Radio-television and Telecommunications Commission on August 2, 2006, and officially launched on July 3, 2007. The CJOC calls were previously used by an AM station in Lethbridge, which now broadcasts as CJRX-FM. That station has no ownership association with the current CJOC. Its sister station was CJCY-FM Medicine Hat.

In December 2018, Clear Sky Radio announced the sale of its remaining stations to Vista Radio. In June 2019, CJOC was rebranded under Vista's standard Juice FM brand.

In July 2020, CJOC reverted to its previous branding of 94.1 CJOC.
