= CFRI-FM =

Radio station in Grande Prairie

Coordinates: 55°14′30″N 118°33′30″W

- Grande Prairie, Alberta; Canada
- Frequency: 104.7 MHz
- Branding: 104.7 The Goat

Programming
- Format: Mainstream rock

Ownership
- Owner: Vista Radio
- Sister stations: CJGY-FM

History
- First air date: March 30, 2007
- Call sign meaning: Sounds like "free" (former branding)

Technical information
- Licensing authority: CRTC
- Class: C
- ERP: 42,900 watts vertical polarization 100,000 watts horizontal polarization
- HAAT: 218.1 metres (716 ft)

Links
- Website: www.mygrandeprairienow.com/on-air/104-7-the-goat-fm/

CFRI-FM (104.7 FM, "104.7 The GOAT") is a radio station in Grande Prairie, Alberta. Owned by Vista Radio, it broadcasts a mainstream rock format.

== History ==
The station began broadcasting on March 30, 2007 with a classic rock format branded as 104.7 Free FM. In July 2014, the station switched to a CHR format branded as 104.7 2Day FM. On January 5, 2026, the CHR format moved to newly-acquired sister station CJGY-FM, and CFRI flipped to mainstream rock as 104.7 The GOAT.
