= CJRX-FM =

Radio station in Lethbridge

Coordinates: 49°42′23″N 112°43′15″W

- Lethbridge, Alberta; Canada
- Broadcast area: Lethbridge County
- Frequency: 106.7 MHz
- Branding: 106.7 Rock

Programming
- Format: Classic rock
- Affiliations: Lethbridge Hurricanes

Ownership
- Owner: Rogers Radio; (Rogers Media, Inc.)
- Sister stations: CFRV-FM

History
- First air date: 1926
- Former call signs: CJOC (1926–2000)
- Former frequencies: 1100 kHz (AM) (1926–1928); 1120 kHz (1928–1942); 1400 kHz (1942–1960); 1220 kHz (1960–2000)
- Call sign meaning: sounds like "rocks"

Technical information
- Class: C
- ERP: 100,000 watts
- HAAT: 183.4 metres (602 ft)

Links
- Website: 1067rock.ca

CJRX-FM (106.7 MHz) is a radio station in Lethbridge, Alberta, Canada. Owned by Rogers Radio, a division of Rogers Sports & Media, the station airs a Classic rock format branded as 106.7 Rock.

== History ==
The station was founded as CJOC in 1926, named after its founder, Jock Palmer. In 1928, it was bought by Taylor Pearson & Carson, which evolved into Selkirk Communications. Originally on 1100 AM, it moved to 1120 in 1928, 1400 in 1942 and 1220 in 1960.

The station was a founding affiliate of the Canadian Broadcasting Corporation in 1936 and then of its Trans-Canada Network until 1962 when it became a CBC Radio network affiliate. The station disaffiliated in 1978.

Along with most of Selkirk's radio holdings, CJOC was sold to Rogers in 1989 after Selkirk merged with Maclean-Hunter. On January 19, 2000 CJOC moved to FM under new call letters, CJRX-FM. With the new frequency and call letters also came with a change in genre on November 3rd, 2000, from country to rock.

In June 2016, Rock 106 slightly rebranded to 106.7 Rock.
