= CFGP-FM =

Radio station in Grande Prairie

Coordinates: 55°27′57″N 118°45′37″W

- Grande Prairie, Alberta; Canada
- Frequency: 97.7 MHz
- Branding: 97.7 Rock

Programming
- Format: Classic rock
- Affiliations: Canadian Broadcasting Corporation (1937–1981)

Ownership
- Owner: Rogers Radio, Inc.

History
- First air date: November 2, 1937
- Former frequencies: 1200 kHz (1937–1940); 1310 kHz (1940–1941); 1340 kHz (1941–1944); 1350 kHz (1944–1946); 1050 kHz (1946–1996)
- Call sign meaning: Coming From Grande Prairie

Technical information
- Licensing authority: CRTC
- Class: C
- ERP: 66,000 watts average 100,000 watts peak horizontal polarization 28,200 watts average 71,800 watts peak vertical polarization
- HAAT: 281 metres (922 ft)

Links
- Website: 977rock.ca

CFGP-FM (97.7 MHz, 97.7 Rock) is a radio station in Grande Prairie, Alberta, Canada. Owned by Rogers Radio, a division of Rogers Sports & Media, it broadcasts a classic rock format.

== History ==
CFGP began as an AM station in 1937 and over the years, the station switched to different AM frequencies until moving to its current frequency at 97.7 MHz after receiving approval by the CRTC in 1996.

CFGP was an affiliate of CBC Radio network and its predecessor, the Trans-Canada Network, until 1981.

== Rebroadcasters ==
CFGP has the following rebroadcasters:

Rebroadcasters of CFGP-FM
City of licence	Identifier	Frequency	Power	RECNet	CRTC Decision
Peace River	CFGP-FM-1	104.3 FM	2,000 watts	Query	97-273
Tumbler Ridge	CFGP-FM-2	104.3 FM	10 watts	Query	2004-425
