= Association canadienne-française de l'Alberta =

Canadian cultural association

- Founded: 1926
- Purpose: Promotion of francophone culture in Alberta
- Location: Edmonton, Alberta
- Region served: Alberta
- Key people: Joseph-Étienne Amyot (1st President)
- Website: acfa.ab.ca

The Association canadienne-française de l'Alberta (French Canadian Association of Alberta) is a Canadian association that seeks to represent and promote the culture of Franco-Albertans within Alberta. It is the largest organisation of its kind in Alberta.

The goals of the ACFA are to provide a collective voice for francophones by working on political grounds, and by providing and organising French language media and cultural events.

== History ==
During the early 20th century, English was the only language used by the Government of Alberta and the sole language used for instruction, with the exception of a primary course that intended to provide a single year of French language instruction at primary schools. In spring of 1925, the francophone community and the Minister of Education, Perren Baker, worked together to establish ministerial regulations in regards to French language education in Alberta. Under the rules established, one hour a day could be spent on French, beginning in Grade 3. Following this, there was a strong need for organisation within the French Albertan community.

On 13 December 1925, 400 French Albertans gathered for a convention at the Hotel Macdonald in Edmonton to create the Association canadienne-française de l'Alberta (French Canadian Association of Alberta; ACFA), a general association for their community. A provisional committee was formed, presided over by Dr. Joseph-Étienne Amyot, to organise the ACFA, which held its first congress from 15 July to 18 July 1926.

Originally, the ACFA was divided by volunteers into 'parish circles' composed of members from a specific parish or Catholic mission. This structure was replaced in 1960, when Alberta was divided into five regional circles. The organisation was financially supported by the Secretary of State of Canada until the position's dissolution in 1996. The ACFA were in attendance of and took part in the Royal Commission on Bilingualism and Biculturalism and the Meech Lake Accord.

== See also ==
- University of Alberta Campus Saint-Jean
