= List of radio stations in British Columbia =

The following is a list of radio stations in the Canadian province of British Columbia, as of 2026. Radio stations are listed here by their legal city of licence. Some stations popularly associated with the Vancouver market may in fact be licensed to outlying communities such as New Westminster, Burnaby or North Vancouver. Those stations are listed under their legal city of licence.

Call sign	Frequency	City of licence	Owner	Format
CKBX	840 AM	100 Mile House	Vista Broadcast Group	country
CBUS-FM	91.3 FM	100 Mile House	CBC Radio One	public News/Talk
CFFM-FM-1	99.7 FM	100 Mile House	Vista Broadcast Group	active rock
VF2577	106.7 FM	100 Mile House	Admiralty House Museum and Archives	christian radio
CBU-1-FM	88.5 FM	Abbotsford	CBC Radio One	public news/talk
CKKS-FM-1	92.5 FM	Abbotsford	Rogers Communications	CHR
CIVL-FM	101.7 FM	Abbotsford	University of the Fraser Valley	campus radio
CKQC-FM	107.1 FM	Abbotsford	Rogers Communications	country
CBRY-FM	105.1 FM	Alert Bay	CBC Radio One	public news/talk
VF2173	97.1 FM	Alexandria	Northern Native Broadcasting	First Nations community radio
CBYU-FM	93.7 FM	Alexis Creek	CBC Radio One	public news/talk
VF2272	96.1 FM	Alkali Lake	Northern Native Broadcasting	First Nations community radio
VF2237	96.1 FM	Anahim Lake	Northern Native Broadcasting	First Nations community radio
CINL	1340 AM	Ashcroft	Stingray Digital	news/talk
CBUA-FM	90.1 FM	Atlin	CBC Radio One	public news/talk
VF2133	96.1 FM	Atlin	Northern Native Broadcasting	First Nations community radio
VF2306	98.1 FM	Atlin	Northern Native Broadcasting, Yukon	First Nations community radio
VF2315	89.7 FM	Avola	North Thompson Yellowhead TV Association	country
VF2316	93.5 FM	Avola	North Thompson Yellowhead TV Association	classic rock
CHLW-FM	93.1 FM	Barriere	Stephen Guay	community radio
CBYO-FM	104.1 FM	Barriere	CBC Radio One	public news/talk
CIFM-FM-5	105.9 FM	Barriere	Jim Pattison Group	active rock
CBTX-FM	89.9 FM	Bella Bella	CBC Radio One	public news/talk
VF2232	97.1 FM	Bella Bella	Northern Native Broadcasting	First Nations community radio
CKNN-FM	91.1 FM	Bella Coola	Nuxalk Acwsalcmalslayc Academy of Learning	First Nations community radio
VF2233	96.1 FM	Bella Coola	Northern Native Broadcasting	First Nations community radio
CBYD-FM	103.5 FM	Bella Coola	CBC Radio One	public news/talk
CHSU-FM-1	98.1 FM	Big White Ski	Bell Media	CHR
CBKM	860 AM	Blue River	CBC Radio One	public news/talk
VF2317	90.3 FM	Blue River	North Thompson Yellowhead TV Association	country
VF2318	93.9 FM	Blue River	North Thompson Yellowhead TV Association	classic rock
VF2110	96.1 FM	Blueberry River	Northern Native Broadcasting	First Nations community radio
CBUD-FM	89.5 FM	Bonnington Falls	CBC Radio One	public news/talk
CIAM-FM-27	91.1 FM	Boston Bar	CARE Radio Broadcasting Association	Christian radio
VF2006	92.9 FM	Boston Bar	Fraser Canyon Television Association	classic rock
CBRZ	1350 AM	Bralorne	CBC Radio One	public news/talk
CBTK-FM-4	106.9 FM	Braeloch	CBC Radio One	public news/talk
VF2327	101.1 FM	Bralorne	Bralorne TV Society	classic rock
CJSF-FM	90.1 FM	Burnaby	Simon Fraser University	campus radio
CFML-FM	107.9 FM	Burnaby	British Columbia Institute of Technology	campus radio
CFLD	760 AM	Burns Lake	Vista Broadcast Group	adult contemporary
CJFW-FM-5	92.9 FM	Burns Lake	Bell Media	country
VF2111	96.1 FM	Burns Lake	Northern Native Broadcasting	First Nations community radio
CBXB-FM	99.1 FM	Burns Lake	CBC Radio One	public news/talk
CIRX-FM-4	107.5 FM	Burns Lake	Vista Broadcast Group	active rock
VF2296	90.5 FM	Burton	Burton TV Society	classic rock
CBYK-FM-2	93.5 FM	Cache Creek	CBC Radio One	public news/talk
CIFM-FM-6	95.3 FM	Cache Creek	Jim Pattison Group	active rock
CFMA-FM	105.9 FM	Cache Creek	Ash-Creek Television Society	community radio
CHVI-FM	88.7 FM	Campbell River	Total Change Christian Ministries	Christian radio
CIQC-FM	99.7 FM	Campbell River	Vista Broadcast Group	CHR
CKCC-FM	100.7 FM	Campbell River	Western Media Group	country
CBYT-FM	104.5 FM	Campbell River	CBC Radio One	public news/talk
VF2377	103.9 FM	Campbell Road	Columbia Electoral Area 'A' Television	country
VF2378	102.3 FM	Campbell Road	Columbia Electoral Area 'A' Television	classic rock
CBYC-FM	91.7 FM	Canal Flats	CBC Radio One	public news/talk
VF2226	98.1 FM	Canyon City	Northern Native Broadcasting	First Nations community radio
CJAT-FM-1	90.3 FM	Castlegar	Bell Media	hot adult contemporary
CKQR-FM	99.3 FM	Castlegar	Vista Broadcast Group	adult rock
CIAM-FM-8	92.5 FM	Charlie Lake	CARE Radio Broadcasting Association	Christian radio
CIFM-FM-8	93.1 FM	Chase	Jim Pattison Group	active rock
CBUH-FM	95.5 FM	Chase	CBC Radio One	public news/talk
CKBZ-FM-2	101.1 FM	Chase	Jim Pattison Group	adult contemporary
VF2230	95.1 FM	Cheslatta	Northern Native Broadcasting	First Nations community radio
CBUZ-FM	93.5 FM	Chetwynd	CBC Radio One	public news/talk
CHET-FM	94.5 FM	Chetwynd	Chetwynd Communications Society	community radio
VF2104	100.5 FM	Chetwynd	Chetwynd Communications Society	classic rock
VF2015	103.9 FM	Chetwynd	Chetwynd Communications Society	country
CHWK-FM	89.5 FM	Chilliwack	Jim Pattison Group	country
CBYF-FM	91.7 FM	Chilliwack	CBC Radio One	public news/talk
CKSR-FM	98.3 FM	Chilliwack	Rogers Communications	adult contemporary
CBU-FM-7	99.9 FM	Chilliwack	CBC Music	public music
CBUF-FM-1	102.1 FM	Chilliwack	Ici Radio-Canada Première	public news/talk (French)
CKKS-FM	107.5 FM	Chilliwack	Rogers Communications	CHR
CBRO-FM	88.5 FM	Christina Lake	CBC Radio One	public news/talk
CKGF-FM-1	93.3 FM	Christina Lake	Vista Broadcast Group	hot adult contemporary
CBKZ	860 AM	Clearwater	CBC Radio One	public news/talk
CHNL-1	1400 AM	Clearwater	Stingray Digital	news/talk/sports
CIFM-FM-2	92.7 FM	Clearwater	Jim Pattison Group	active rock
CKBZ-FM-4	102.9 FM	Clearwater	Jim Pattison Group	adult contemporary
CBUU-FM	98.9 FM	Clinton	CBC Radio One	public news/talk
CIFM-FM-4	101.3 FM	Clinton	Jim Pattison Group	active rock
CBKO	540 AM	Coal Harbour	CBC Radio One	public news/talk
CBXH	1540 AM	Cooper Creek	CBC Radio One	public news/talk
CKTZ-FM	89.5 FM	Cortes Island	Cortes Community Radio Society	community radio
CKLR-FM	97.3 FM	Courtenay	Jim Pattison Group	hot adult contemporary
CFCP-FM	98.9 FM	Courtenay	Vista Broadcast Group	active rock
CBRR-FM	101.3 FM	Cranbrook	CBC Radio One	public news/talk
CHDR-FM	102.9 FM	Cranbrook	Jim Pattison Group	active rock
CHBZ-FM	104.7 FM	Cranbrook	Jim Pattison Group	country
VF2497	106.5 FM	Cranbrook	The Seventh-day Adventist Church	Religious
CFSM-FM	107.5 FM	Cranbrook	Clear Sky Radio	adult contemporary
CBTE-FM	89.9 FM	Crawford Bay	CBC Radio One	public news/talk
CHNV-FM-1	91.9 FM	Crawford Bay	Vista Broadcast Group	hot adult contemporary
CJLY-FM-1	96.5 FM	Crawford Bay	Kootenay Cooperative Radio	community radio
CKKC-FM-1	101.9 FM	Crawford Bay	Bell Media	hot adult contemporary
CFKC	1340 AM	Creston	Bell Media	hot adult contemporary
VF2507	92.9 FM	Creston	The Seventh-day Adventist Church	Religious
CKCV-FM	94.1 FM	Creston	Vista Broadcast Group	adult hits
CIDO-FM	97.7 FM	Creston	Creston Community Radio	community radio
CBTS-FM	100.3 FM	Creston	CBC Radio One	public news/talk
CICV-FM	98.7 FM	Cowichan Valley	Cowichan Valley Radio Ltd.	Community Radio
CFNB-FM	97.5 FM	D'Arcy	Anderson Lake Recreational and Cultural Society	community radio
CJDC	890 AM	Dawson Creek	Bell Media	country
CBKQ-FM	89.7 FM	Dawson Creek	CBC Radio One	public news/talk
CBUF-FM-7	93.7 FM	Dawson Creek	Ici Radio-Canada Première	public news/talk (French)
CHRX-FM-1	95.1 FM	Dawson Creek	Bell Media	hot adult contemporary
CHAD-FM	104.1 FM	Dawson Creek	Chetwynd Communications Society	adult contemporary
CIAM-FM-9	107.5 FM	Dawson Creek	CARE Radio Broadcasting Association	Christian radio
CHON-FM-4	90.5 FM	Dease Lake	Northern Native Broadcasting, Yukon	First Nations community radio
VF2066	97.1 FM	Dease Lake	Northern Native Broadcasting	First Nations community radio
VF2141	98.1 FM	Dease Lake	Dease Lake Broadcast Society	community-owned CBC Radio One rebroadcaster
VF2223	100.1 FM	Dease Lake	Dease Lake Broadcast Society	classic rock
VF2236	97.1 FM	Decker Lake	Northern Native Broadcasting	First Nations community radio
VF2276	96.1 FM	Dog Creek	Northern Native Broadcasting	First Nations community radio
VF2112	96.1 FM	Doig River	Northern Native Broadcasting	First Nations community radio
CBWD	900 AM	Donald Station	CBC Radio One	public news/talk
VF2000	94.5 FM	Donald Station	Columbia Electoral Area 'A' Television	classic rock
VF2002	100.1 FM	Donald Station	Columbia Electoral Area 'A' Television	country
CJSU-FM	89.7 FM	Duncan	Vista Broadcast Group	adult alternative
CBXM	860 AM	Edgewood	CBC Radio One	public news/talk
CJEV	1340 AM	Elkford	Stingray Digital	country
CBYX-FM	92.7 FM	Enderby	CBC Radio One	public news/talk
CKIZ-FM-1	93.9 FM	Enderby	Rogers Communications	adult contemporary
CICF-FM-4	98.7 FM	Enderby	Bell Media	hot adult contemporary
CKXR-FM-2	104.3 FM	Enderby	Bell Media	adult contemporary
CBTF-FM	102.7 FM	Falkland	CBC Radio One	public news/talk
CFBZ-FM	92.7 FM	Fernie	Jim Pattison Group	country
CBTN-FM	97.7 FM	Fernie	CBC Radio One	public news/talk
CJDR-FM	99.1 FM	Fernie	Jim Pattison Group	active rock
CFSM-FM-1	107.9 FM	Fernie	Clear Sky Radio	adult contemporary
CBTK-FM-1	97.1 FM	Field	CBC Radio One	public news/talk
VF2231	98.1 FM	Fort Babine	Northern Native Broadcasting	First Nations community radio
CBXR-FM	102.9 FM	Fort Fraser	CBC Radio One	public news/talk
CBUO-FM	88.3 FM	Fort Nelson	CBC Radio One	public news/talk
CFNR-FM-2	96.1 FM	Fort Nelson	Northern Native Broadcasting (Terrace)	First Nations community radio
CBPT-FM	99.3 FM	Fort Nelson	CBC/Weatheradio Canada	weather alerts
CKRX-FM	102.3 FM	Fort Nelson	Bell Media	adult hits
CIFJ	1480 AM	Fort St. James	Vista Broadcast Group	country
CBUV-FM	91.9 FM	Fort St. James	CBC Radio One	public news/talk
CIRX-FM-2	94.7 FM	Fort St. James	Vista Broadcast Group	active rock
VF2064	97.1 FM	Fort St. James	Northern Native Broadcasting	First Nations community radio
VF2099	97.9 FM	Fort St. James	Fort St. James Television Society	country
VF2100	99.9 FM	Fort St. James	Fort St. James Television Society	classic rock
VF2101	101.9 FM	Fort St. James	Fort St. James Television Society	community-owned CBC Radio One rebroadcaster
VF2103	103.9 FM	Fort St. James	Fort St. James Television Society	classic rock
CBYJ-FM	88.3 FM	Fort St. John	CBC Radio One	public news/talk
CHRX-FM	98.5 FM	Fort St. John	Bell Media	hot adult contemporary
CKFU-FM	100.1 FM	Fort St. John	663975 B.C. Ltd.	classic hits
CKNL-FM	101.5 FM	Fort St. John	Bell Media	adult hits
VF2113	96.1 FM	Fort Ware	Northern Native Broadcasting	First Nations community radio
CIFL	1450 AM	Fraser Lake	Vista Broadcast Group	country
VF2473	92.1 FM	Fraser Lake	Fraser Lake and District Rebroadcasting	classic rock
VF2474	93.1 FM	Fraser Lake	Fraser Lake and District Rebroadcasting	country
VF2475	94.1 FM	Fraser Lake	Fraser Lake and District Rebroadcasting	classic rock
VF2476	95.1 FM	Fraser Lake	Fraser Lake and District Rebroadcasting	community-owned CBC Radio One rebroadcaster
CISC-FM	107.5 FM	Gibsons	Rogers Communications	hot adult contemporary
VF2118	96.1 FM	Gitanyow	Northern Native Broadcasting	First Nations community radio
VF2271	96.1 FM	Gitlakdamix	Northern Native Broadcasting	First Nations community radio
CBYA-FM	102.3 FM	Gitlakdamix	CBC Radio One	public news/talk
VF2135	97.1 FM	Gitsegeukla	Northern Native Broadcasting	First Nations community radio
CBTG	860 AM	Gold Bridge	CBC Radio One	public news/talk
CBKJ	860 AM	Gold River	CBC Radio One	public news/talk
CJGR-FM	100.1 FM	Gold River	Vista Broadcast Group	CHR
VF2508	99.9 FM	Golden	The Seventh-day Adventist Church	Religious
CBXE-FM	101.7 FM	Golden	CBC Radio One	public news/talk
CKGR-FM	106.3 FM	Golden	Bell Media	adult hits
VF2072	96.1 FM	Good Hope Lake	Northern Native Broadcasting	First Nations community radio
VF2353	98.1 FM	Good Hope Lake	Northern Native Broadcasting Yukon	First Nations community radio
CJAT-FM-2	103.3 FM	Grand Forks	Bell Media	hot adult contemporary
CBTK-FM-2	107.3 FM	Grand Forks	CBC Radio One	public news/talk
CBKG	920 AM	Granisle	CBC Radio One	public news/talk
CHLD	1480 AM	Granisle	Vista Broadcast Group	adult contemporary
VF2350	99.9 FM	Granisle	Granisle T.V. Society	adult contemporary
VF2351	100.5 FM	Granisle	Granisle T.V. Society	country
VF2004	101.5 FM	Granisle	Granisle T.V. Society	classic rock
VF2352	101.9 FM	Granisle	Granisle T.V. Society	country
CKGF-FM-2	96.7 FM	Greenwood	Vista Broadcast Group	hot adult contemporary
CBYI-FM	88.1 FM	Hagensborg	CBC Radio One	public news/talk
VF2287	92.7 FM	Hagensborg	Hagensborg TV Society	classic rock
VF2288	94.1 FM	Hagensborg	Hagensborg TV Society	First Nations community radio
VF2162	96.1 FM	Halfway River	Northern Native Broadcasting	First Nations community radio
CBYH-FM	96.7 FM	Harrison Hot Springs	CBC Radio One	public news/talk
CFNR-FM-5	96.1 FM	Hartley Bay	Northern Native Broadcasting (Terrace)	First Nations community radio
VF2163	98.1 FM	Hazelton	Northern Native Broadcasting	First Nations community radio
CJFW-FM-8	101.9 FM	Hazelton	Bell Media	country
CFHG	1490 AM	Holberg	Western Forest Products Ltd.	community-owned CBC Radio One rebroadcaster
VF2532	94.1 FM	Hope	The Seventh-day Adventist Church	Religious
CFSR-FM	100.5 FM	Hope	Rogers Communications	adult contemporary
CBUE-FM	101.7 FM	Hope	CBC Radio One	public news/talk
CHFR-FM	96.5 FM	Hornby Island	Hornby Community Radio Society	community radio
CFNR-FM-6	96.1 FM	Houston	Northern Native Broadcasting (Terrace)	First Nations community radio
CBUR-FM	102.1 FM	Houston	CBC Radio One	public news/talk
CKEH-FM	104.7 FM	Houston	Houston-Smithers Rebroadcasting Society	community-owned CBC Music rebroadcaster
CJFW-FM-7	105.5 FM	Houston	Bell Media	country
CHBV-FM	106.5 FM	Houston	Vista Broadcast Group	adult contemporary
CBYG-FM-2	103.1 FM	Hudson's Hope	CBC Radio One	public news/talk
CKHH-FM	106.1 FM	Hudson's Hope	District of Hudson Hope	classic rock
VF2279	96.1 FM	Ingenika	Northern Native Broadcasting	First Nations community radio
CKIR	870 AM	Invermere	Bell Media	adult hits
CJAQ-FM-3	97.3 FM	Invermere	Rogers Communications	adult hits
CJAY-FM-3	99.7 FM	Invermere	Bell Media	active rock
CFSM-FM-3	107.7 FM	Invermere	Clear Sky Radio	adult contemporary
VF2114	96.1 FM	Iskut	Northern Native Broadcasting	First Nations community radio
CHNL	610 AM	Kamloops	Stingray Digital	news/talk/sports
CFBX-FM	92.5 FM	Kamloops	Thompson Rivers University	campus radio
CBYK-FM	94.1 FM	Kamloops	CBC Radio One	public news/talk
CBUF-FM-6	96.5 FM	Kamloops	Ici Radio-Canada Première	public news/talk (French)
CKRV-FM	97.5 FM	Kamloops	Stingray Digital	classic rock
CIFM-FM	98.3 FM	Kamloops	Jim Pattison Group	active rock
CKXB-FM	99.1 FM	Kamloops	International Harvesters for Christ Evangelistic Association Inc.	Christian radio
CKBZ-FM	100.1 FM	Kamloops	Jim Pattison Group	hot adult contemporary
CBPL-FM	101.9 FM	Kamloops	CBC/Weatheradio Canada	weather alerts
CJKC-FM	103.1 FM	Kamloops	Stingray Digital	country
CBU-FM-4	105.3 FM	Kamloops	CBC Music	public music
CBUG	860 AM	Kaslo	CBC Radio One	public news/talk
CKZX-FM-1	95.3 FM	Kaslo	Bell Media	hot adult contemporary
CKFR	1150 AM	Kelowna	Bell Media	oldies
CFIH-FM	88.1 FM	Kelowna	International Harvesters for Christ Evangelistic Association Inc.	Christian radio
CBTK-FM	88.9 FM	Kelowna	CBC Radio One	public news/talk
CBU-FM-3	89.7 FM	Kelowna	CBC Music	public music
CBUF-FM-2	90.5 FM	Kelowna	Ici Radio-Canada Première	public news/talk (French)
CKKO-FM	96.3 FM	Kelowna	Stingray Digital	classic rock
CHSU-FM	99.9 FM	Kelowna	Bell Media	CHR
CILK-FM	101.5 FM	Kelowna	Bell Media	adult contemporary
CKQQ-FM	103.1 FM	Kelowna	Jim Pattison Group	adult hits
CKOV-FM	103.9 FM	Kelowna	Radius Holdings Inc.	adult contemporary
CKLZ-FM	104.7 FM	Kelowna	Jim Pattison Group	active rock
VF2201	89.9 FM	Kemano	Kemano Community Association	First Nations community radio
VF2202	91.5 FM	Kemano	Kemano Community Association	hot adult contemporary
VF2203	93.5 FM	Kemano	Kemano Community Association	country
VF2204	95.5 FM	Kemano	Kemano Community Association	classic rock
VF2205	97.5 FM	Kemano	Kemano Community Association	multilingual
VF2206	98.9 FM	Kemano	Kemano Community Association	news/talk
VF2207	100.5 FM	Kemano	Kemano Community Association	First Nations community radio
VF2208	102.5 FM	Kemano	Kemano Community Association	community-owned CBC Music rebroadcaster
VF2209	103.5 FM	Kemano	Kemano Community Association	classic rock
CBKY	1350 AM	Keremeos	CBC Radio One	public news/talk
CIGV-FM-1	98.9 FM	Keremeos	Great Valleys Radio	country
CBYY-FM	90.9 FM	Kersley	CBC Radio One	public news/talk
CBRK	900 AM	Kimberley	CBC Radio One	public news/talk
VF2115	96.1 FM	Kincolith	Northern Native Broadcasting	First Nations community radio
CBTD	91.3 FM	Kispiox	CBC Radio One	public news/talk
CJFW-FM-1	92.9 FM	Kitimat	Bell Media	country
CKTK-FM	97.7 FM	Kitimat	Bell Media	adult hits
CBUK-FM	101.1 FM	Kitimat	CBC Radio One	public news/talk
CBUF-FM-5	105.1 FM	Kitimat	Ici Radio-Canada Première	public news/talk (French)
VF2116	96.1 FM	Kitamaat Village	Northern Native Broadcasting	First Nations community radio
VF2117	98.1 FM	Kitkatla	Northern Native Broadcasting	First Nations community radio
CBTZ-FM	94.3 FM	Kitwanga	CBC Radio One	public news/talk
VF2165	98.1 FM	Kitwanga	Northern Native Broadcasting	First Nations community radio
VF2227	96.1 FM	Klemtu	Northern Native Broadcasting	First Nations community radio
CICV-FM	98.7 FM	Lake Cowichan	Cowichan Valley Community Radio Society	community radio
CFNR-FM-4	96.1 FM	Laxgalts'ap	Northern Native Broadcasting	First Nations community radio
CBUL	92.7 FM	Lillooet	CBC Radio One	public news/talk
VF2144	93.9 FM	Lillooet	Lillooet-Camelsfoot TV Association	country
CHLS-FM	100.5 FM	Lillooet	Radio Lillooet Society	community radio
VF2343	89.3 FM	Logan Lake	Logan Lake TV Society	community-owned CBC Music rebroadcaster
VF2344	91.1 FM	Logan Lake	Logan Lake TV Society	country
CBYE-FM	92.9 FM	Logan Lake	CBC Radio One	public news/talk
VF2345	94.9 FM	Logan Lake	Logan Lake TV Society	adult hits
VF2053	102.5 FM	Logan Lake	Logan Lake TV Society	classic rock
VF2078	96.1 FM	Lower Post	Northern Native Broadcasting	First Nations community radio
VF2311	98.1 FM	Lower Post	Northern Native Broadcasting, Yukon	First Nations community radio
CBYL-FM	96.7 FM	Lumby	CBC Radio One	public news/talk
CBTY-FM	93.1 FM	Lytton	CBC Radio One	public news/talk
CIAK-FM	102.3 FM	Lytton	Jim Pattison Group	active rock
CBWF	920 AM	Mackenzie	CBC Radio One	public news/talk
CKMK	1240 AM	Mackenzie	Jim Pattison Group	classic rock CKDV-FM rebroadcaster
CHMM-FM	103.5 FM	Mackenzie	Mackenzie and Area Radio Society	community radio
CKKN-FM-2	105.7 FM	Mackenzie	Jim Pattison Group	hot adult contemporary
CILC-FM	94.7 FM	Magma Bay	Bell Media	adult contemporary
CJFW-FM-4	92.9 FM	Masset	Bell Media	country
CBTM-FM	103.9 FM	Masset	CBC Radio One	public news/talk
VF2079	96.1 FM	Massett Reserve	Northern Native Broadcasting	First Nations community radio
CBTC-FM	92.1 FM	McBride	CBC Radio One	public news/talk
VF2151	101.1 FM	McBride	Robson Valley Entertainment Association	classic rock
VF2152	104.1 FM	McBride	Robson Valley Entertainment Association	country
CKKN-FM-1	92.5 FM	McLeod Lake	Jim Pattison Group	hot adult contemporary
VF2273	96.1 FM	McLeod Lake	Northern Native Broadcasting	First Nations community radio
CBUP	860 AM; 98.7 FM	Merritt	CBC Radio One	public news/talk (Moving to 98.7 FM as CBUP-FM)
CJNL	1230 AM	Merritt	Stingray Digital	talk radio
CKBZ-FM-3	99.5 FM	Merritt	Jim Pattison Group	adult contemporary
CKMQ-FM	101.1 FM	Merritt	Merritt Broadcasting	adult contemporary
CIFM-FM-3	103.9 FM	Merritt	Jim Pattison Group	active rock
CBCV-FM-1	99.5 FM	Metchosin	CBC Radio One	public news/talk
CBU-FM-2	105.1 FM	Metchosin	CBC Music	public music
VF2119	98.1 FM	Metlakatla	Northern Native Broadcasting	First Nations community radio
CBXA	1150 AM	Mica Dam	CBC Radio One	public news/talk
VF2077	96.1 FM	Moberly Lake	Northern Native Broadcasting	First Nations community radio
VF2169	95.1 FM	Moricetown	Northern Native Broadcasting	First Nations community radio
CBTI-FM	96.5 FM	Moricetown	CBC Radio One	public news/talk
VF2515	92.9 FM	Nakusp	The Seventh-day Adventist Church	Religious
CBUM-FM	99.9 FM	Nakusp	CBC Radio One	public news/talk
CKBS-FM	103.1 FM	Nakusp	Bell Media	hot adult contemporary
CJHQ-FM	107.1 FM	Nakusp	Columbia Basin Alliance for Literacy	community radio
CHLY-FM	101.7 FM	Nanaimo	The Radio Malaspina Society	campus radio
CKWV-FM	102.3 FM	Nanaimo	Jim Pattison Group	hot adult contemporary
CHWF-FM	106.9 FM	Nanaimo	Jim Pattison Group	active rock
VF2274	98.1 FM	Nautley	Native Communications Society of the Northwest Territories	First Nations community radio
CJLY-FM	93.5 FM	Nelson	Kootenay Cooperative Radio	community radio
CBYN-FM	98.7 FM	Nelson	CBC Radio One	public news/talk
CHNV-FM	103.5 FM	Nelson	Vista Broadcast Group	adult hits
CKKC-FM	106.9 FM	Nelson	Bell Media	hot adult contemporary
VF2228	96.1 FM	Nemaiah Valley	Northern Native Broadcasting	First Nations community radio
CKZX-FM	93.5 FM	New Denver	Bell Media	hot adult contemporary
CBTK-FM-3	102.5 FM	New Denver	CBC Radio One	public news/talk
CBRH	1170 AM	New Hazelton	CBC Radio One	public news/talk
CKBV	1490 AM	New Hazelton	Vista Broadcast Group	adult contemporary
CHNW-FM (British Columbia)	88.7 FM	New Westminster	City of New Westminster	Emergency Broadcast System/Disaster info
CBRN-FM	90.7 FM	North Bend	CBC Radio One	public news/talk
CBXO-FM	92.1 FM	Ocean Falls	CBC Radio One	public news/talk
CJMG-FM-2	99.9 FM	Oliver	Bell Media	hot adult contemporary
CJOR-FM	102.9 FM	Oliver	Bell Media	adult hits
CJOR	1240 AM	Osoyoos	Bell Media	adult hits
CBUB-FM	95.3 FM	Osoyoos	CBC Radio One	public news/talk
CIBH-FM	88.5 FM	Parksville/Qualicum Beach	Jim Pattison Group	adult contemporary
CHPQ-FM	99.9 FM	Parksville/Qualicum Beach	Jim Pattison Group	pop standards
CKPL-FM	99.1 FM	Peachland	CBC Music	public music
CBU-3-FM	91.5 FM	Pemberton	CBC Radio One	public news/talk
CFPV-FM	98.9 FM	Pemberton	McBride Communications	community radio
CISP-FM	104.5 FM	Pemberton	Rogers Communications	hot adult contemporary
VF2005	106.7 FM	Pemberton	Coast Mountain Communications	country
CIPN-FM	104.7 FM	Pender Harbour	Rogers Communications	adult contemporary
CKOR	800 AM	Penticton	Bell Media	adult hits
CFUZ-FM	92.9 FM	Penticton	Peach City Community Radio Society	community radio
CBTP-FM	93.7 FM	Penticton	CBC Radio One	public news/talk
CJMG-FM	97.1 FM	Penticton	Bell Media	hot adult contemporary
CIGV-FM	100.7 FM	Penticton	Great Valleys Radio	country
CBRJ-FM	97.9 FM	Phoenix Mountain	CBC Radio One	public news/talk
CJAV-FM	93.3 FM	Port Alberni	Jim Pattison Group	adult contemporary
CBUF-FM-8	94.9 FM	Port Alberni	Ici Radio-Canada Première	public news/talk (French)
CBTQ-FM	98.1 FM	Port Alberni	CBC Radio One	public news/talk
CBCV-FM-2	92.3 FM	Port Alice	CBC Radio One	public news/talk
CFPA-FM	100.3 FM	Port Alice	Vista Broadcast Group	adult contemporary
CBYB-FM	102.9 FM	Port Clements	CBC Radio One	public news/talk
CFNI	1240 AM	Port Hardy	Vista Broadcast Group	adult contemporary
CBUY-FM	95.5 FM	Port Hardy	CBC Radio One	public news/talk
CBPD-FM	103.7 FM	Port Hardy	CBC/Weatheradio Canada	weather alerts
VF2170	96.1 FM	Port Simpson	Northern Native Broadcasting	First Nations community radio
CJMP-FM	90.1 FM	Powell River	Powell River Community Radio Society	community radio
CBUW-FM	92.5 FM	Powell River	CBC Radio One	public news/talk
CFPW-FM	95.7 FM	Powell River	Vista Broadcast Group	adult contemporary
CIAM-FM-19	105.5 FM	Prespatou	CARE Radio Broadcasting Association	Christian radio
CFUR-FM	88.7 FM	Prince George	University of Northern British Columbia	campus radio
CBU-FM-5	90.3 FM	Prince George	CBC Music	public music
CBYG-FM	91.5 FM	Prince George	CBC Radio One	public news/talk
CFIS-FM	93.1 FM	Prince George	Prince George Community Radio Society	community radio
CIRX-FM	94.3 FM	Prince George	Vista Broadcast Group	modern rock
CBUF-FM-4	95.5 FM	Prince George	Ici Radio-Canada Première	public news/talk (French)
CJCI-FM	97.3 FM	Prince George	Vista Broadcast Group	country
CKDV-FM	99.3 FM	Prince George	Jim Pattison Group	classic hits
CKKN-FM	101.3 FM	Prince George	Jim Pattison Group	hot adult contemporary
CFPR	860 AM	Prince Rupert	CBC Radio One	public news/talk
CHTK-FM	99.1 FM	Prince Rupert	Bell Media	adult hits
CIAJ-FM	100.7 FM	Prince Rupert	Christian Family Inspirational Radio Ministries	Christian radio
CJFW-FM-2	101.9 FM	Prince Rupert	Bell Media	country
CIOR	1400 AM	Princeton	Bell Media	adult contemporary
CBRG-FM	93.1 FM	Princeton	CBC Radio One	public news/talk
CIGV-FM-2	98.1 FM	Princeton	Great Valleys Radio	country
CKBZ-FM-1	104.5 FM	Pritchard	Jim Pattison Group	adult contemporary
CIFM-FM-7	106.3 FM	Pritchard	Jim Pattison Group	active rock
CBYQ-FM	104.9 FM	Queen Charlotte	CBC Radio One	public news/talk
CBRQ-FM	90.9 FM	Quesnel	CBC Radio One	public news/talk
VF8026	92.3 FM	Quesnel	The Seventh-day Adventist Church	Religious
CFFM-FM-2	94.9 FM	Quesnel	Vista Broadcast Group	active rock
CFNR-FM-1	96.1 FM	Quesnel	Northern Native Broadcasting (Terrace)	First Nations community radio
CKCQ-FM	100.3 FM	Quesnel	Vista Broadcast Group	country
CBU-FM-6	106.9 FM	Quesnel	CBC Music	public music
CBUQ-FM	94.5 FM	Radium Hot Springs	CBC Radio One	public news/talk
VF2238	96.1 FM	Redstone Flat	Northern Native Broadcasting	First Nations community radio
CBTO-FM	91.3 FM	Revelstoke	CBC Radio One	public news/talk
VF2590	92.5 FM	Revelstoke	Stoke FM Radio Society	community radio
CKCR-FM	106.1 FM	Revelstoke	Bell Media	adult hits
VF2098	98.7 FM	Riley Creek	Lillooet-Camelsfoot TV Association	community-owned CBC Music rebroadcaster
VF2194	104.5 FM	Riley Creek	Lillooet-Camelsfoot TV Association	classic rock
CBYR-FM	94.1 FM	Rock Creek	CBC Radio One	public news/talk
CKGF-FM-3	103.7 FM	Rock Creek	Vista Broadcast Group	hot adult contemporary
CIAM-FM-26	107.5 FM	Rose Prairie	CARE Radio Broadcasting Association	Christian radio
CHLI-FM	101.1 FM	Rossland	Rossland Radio Cooperative	community radio
CBUN	740 AM	Salmo	CBC Radio One	public news/talk
CFAD-FM	92.1 FM	Salmo	Salmo FM Radio Society	community radio
CKXR-FM	91.5 FM	Salmon Arm	Bell Media	adult hits
CKVS-FM	93.7 FM	Salmon Arm	Voice of the Shuswap Broadcast Society	community radio
CBUC-FM	96.9 FM	Salmon Arm	CBC Radio One	public news/talk
CIOC-FM-1	98.5 FM	Saltspring Island	Rogers Communications	adult contemporary
CHIR-FM	107.9 FM	Saltspring Island	Gulf Islands Community Radio Society	community radio
CJFW-FM-3	92.9 FM	Sandspit	Bell Media	country
CIFM-FM-1	101.9 FM	Savona	Jim Pattison Group	active rock
CBKU	630 AM	Sayward	CBC Radio One	public news/talk
CKAY-FM	91.7 FM	Sechelt	Westwave Broadcasting	classic hits
CFUN-FM	104.7 FM	Sechelt	Rogers Communications	hot adult contemporary
VF2218	103.5 FM	Seton Portage	Bridge River Community Recreational Society	community-owned rebroadcaster of CFMI-FM Vancouver
VF2219	106.1 FM	Seton Portage	Bridge River Community Recreational Society	community-owned rebroadcaster of CBU-FM Vancouver
CBKN	990 AM	Shalalth	CBC Radio One	public news/talk
CHBR-FM	95.1 FM	Shalalth	Jim Pattison Group	active rock
VF2171	97.1 FM	Skidegate	Northern Native Broadcasting	First Nations community radio
CFBV	870 AM	Smithers	Vista Broadcast Group	adult contemporary
CKEW-FM	88.1 FM	Smithers	Houston-Smithers Rebroadcasting Society	community-owned CBC Music rebroadcaster
CJFW-FM-6	92.9 FM	Smithers	Bell Media	country
CICK-FM	93.9 FM	Smithers	Smithers Community Radio Society	community radio
VF2169	95.1 FM	Smithers	Northern Native Broadcasting	First Nations community radio
CBRS-FM	97.5 FM	Smithers	CBC Radio One	public news/talk
CKKQ-FM-1	94.7 FM	Sooke	Jim Pattison Group	active rock
CJZN-FM-1	97.1 FM	Sooke	Jim Pattison Group	modern rock
CKXR-FM-1	102.1 FM	Sorrento	Bell Media	adult contemporary
CJDR-FM-1	93.5 FM	Sparwood	Jim Pattison Group	active rock
CBYS-FM	105.7 FM	Sparwood	CBC Radio One	public news/talk
CFSM-FM-2	107.1 FM	Sparwood	Clear Sky Radio	adult contemporary
CBRU-FM	98.3 FM	Squamish	CBC Radio One	public news/talk
CFDT-FM	99.7 FM	Squamish	Four Senses Entertainment	Contemporary hit radio
CISQ-FM	107.1 FM	Squamish	Rogers Communications	hot adult contemporary
CBKA	1450 AM	Stewart	CBC Radio One	public news/talk
VF2234	98.1 FM	Stoney Creek	Northern Native Broadcasting	First Nations community radio
VF2235	97.1 FM	Sugar Cane	Northern Native Broadcasting	First Nations community radio
CHOR-FM	98.5 FM	Summerland	Bell Media	adult hits
CIFM-FM-9	90.1 FM	Sun Peaks	Jim Pattison Group	active rock
CKBZ-FM-5	91.5 FM	Sun Peaks	Jim Pattison Group	adult contemporary
VF2689	106.9 FM	Surrey	Ravinder Singh Pannu	multilingual
CISF-FM	107.7 FM	Surrey	South Fraser Broadcasting	hot adult contemporary
CJCN-FM	91.5 FM	Surrey	Akash Broadcasting Inc.	multilingual
VF2166	98.1 FM	Tachie	Northern Native Broadcasting	First Nations community radio
CBTT-FM	90.5 FM	Tahsis	CBC Radio One	public news/talk
VF2164	96.1 FM	Takla Landing	Northern Native Broadcasting	First Nations community radio
CFUG-FM	94.9 FM	Tatalrose	Burns Lake & District Rebroadcasting Society	community-owned CBC Radio One rebroadcaster
CIAM-FM-28	92.7 FM	Telegraph Creek	CARE Radio Broadcasting Association	Christian radio
VF2120	96.1 FM	Telegraph Creek	Northern Native Broadcasting	First Nations community radio
CFTK	590 AM	Terrace	Bell Media	adult hits
CFNR-FM	92.1 FM	Terrace	Northern Native Broadcasting	First Nations community radio
CBTH-FM	95.3 FM	Terrace	CBC Radio One	public news/talk
CBUF-FM-3	96.9 FM	Terrace	Ici Radio-Canada Première	public news/talk (French)
VF2535	101.5 FM	Terrace	The Seventh-day Adventist Church	Religious
CJFW-FM	103.1 FM	Terrace	Bell Media	country
CHMZ-FM	90.1 FM	Tofino	McBride Communications	classic rock
CBXZ-FM	91.5 FM	Tofino	CBC Radio One	public news/talk
CJWC-FM-1	99.9 FM	Tofino	West Coast Community TV Association	country
VF2229	95.1 FM	Topley	Northern Native Broadcasting	First Nations community radio
CBTA-FM	94.9 FM	Trail	CBC Radio One	public news/talk
CJAT-FM	95.7 FM	Trail	Bell Media	adult hits
CHRT-FM	104.1 FM	Trail	Vista Broadcast Group	active rock
CBTU-FM	89.9 FM	Tumbler Ridge	CBC Radio One	public news/talk
CJDC-1-FM	92.7 FM	Tumbler Ridge	Bell Media	country
VF2051	101.1 FM	Tumbler Ridge	Persona Communications	classic rock
CBPU	1260 AM	Ucluelet	CBC/Weatheradio Canada	weather alerts/park information
CBXZ-FM-1	92.7 FM	Ucluelet	CBC Radio One	public news/talk
CIMM-FM	99.5 FM	Ucluelet	McBride Communications	community radio
CIWC-FM	102.7 FM	Ucluelet	Rogers Communications	(dark)
CJWC-FM	107.3 FM	Ucluelet	West Coast Community TV Association	country
CBTV-FM	90.3 FM	Valemount	CBC Radio One	public news/talk
VF2122	91.1 FM	Valemount	Valemount Entertainment Society	classic rock
VF2123	95.5 FM	Valemount	Valemount Entertainment Society	community-owned CBC Music rebroadcaster
VF2221	104.1 FM	Valemount	Valemount Entertainment Society	country
CBU	690 AM	Vancouver	CBC Radio One	public news/talk
CKNW	730 AM	Vancouver	Corus Entertainment	news/talk
CJRJ	1200 AM	Vancouver	I.T. Productions	multilingual
CHMB	1320 AM	Vancouver	Mainstream Broadcasting Corporation	multilingual
CBU-2-FM	88.1 FM	Vancouver	CBC Radio One	public news/talk
CBUX-FM	90.9 FM	Vancouver	Ici Musique	public music (French)
CKYE-FM	93.1 FM	Vancouver	South Asian Broadcasting Corporation	multilingual
CJJR-FM	93.7 FM	Vancouver	Jim Pattison Group	country
CFBT-FM	94.5 FM	Vancouver	Bell Media	CHR
CKZZ-FM	95.3 FM	Vancouver	Stingray Digital	hot adult contemporary
CHKG-FM	96.1 FM	Vancouver	Fairchild Radio	multilingual
CJAX-FM	96.9 FM	Vancouver	Rogers Communications	adult hits
CBUF-FM	97.7 FM	Vancouver	Ici Radio-Canada Première	public news/talk (French)
CIWV-FM	98.3 FM	Vancouver	Durham Radio	Smooth jazz
CFOX-FM	99.3 FM	Vancouver	Corus Entertainment	active rock
CFRO-FM	100.5 FM	Vancouver	Vancouver Cooperative Radio	community radio
CFMI-FM	101.1 FM	Vancouver	Corus Entertainment	classic rock
CITR-FM	101.9 FM	Vancouver	University of British Columbia	campus radio
CKPK-FM	102.7 FM	Vancouver	Jim Pattison Group	modern rock
CHQM-FM	103.5 FM	Vancouver	Bell Media	adult contemporary
CHLG-FM	104.3 FM	Vancouver	Stingray Digital	adult hits
CKKS-FM-2	104.9 FM	Vancouver	Rogers Communications	CHR
CBU-FM	105.7 FM	Vancouver	CBC Music	public music
CKUR	106.3 FM	Vancouver	Northern Native Broadcasting	first Nations
CIRX-FM-1	95.9 FM	Vanderhoof	Vista Broadcast Group	active rock
CBRV-FM	96.7 FM	Vanderhoof	CBC Radio One	public news/talk
CIAM-FM-11	98.5 FM	Vanderhoof	CARE Radio Broadcasting Association	Christian radio
CBYZ-FM	91.9 FM	Vavenby	CBC Radio One	public news/talk
CICF-FM	105.7 FM	Vernon	Bell Media	CHR
CBYV-FM	106.5 FM	Vernon	CBC Radio One	public news/talk
CKIZ-FM	107.5 FM	Vernon	Jim Pattison Group	adult hits
CFAX	1070 AM	Victoria	Bell Media	news/talk
CBUX-FM-1	88.9 FM	Victoria	Ici Musique	public music (French)
CBCV-FM	90.5 FM	Victoria	CBC Radio One	public news/talk
CJZN-FM	91.3 FM	Victoria	Jim Pattison Group	modern rock
CBU-FM-1	92.1 FM	Victoria	CBC Music	public music
CIOC-FM	98.5 FM	Victoria	Rogers Communications	adult contemporary
CBUF-FM-9	99.7 FM	Victoria	Ici Radio-Canada Première	public news/talk (French)
CKKQ-FM	100.3 FM	Victoria	Jim Pattison Group	active rock
CFUV-FM	101.9 FM	Victoria	University of Victoria	campus radio
CHTT-FM	103.1 FM	Victoria	Rogers Communications	adult hits
CHBE-FM	107.3 FM	Victoria	Bell Media	CHR
CILS-FM	107.9 FM	Victoria	Société radio communautaire Victoria	community radio (French)
CBYW	540 AM	Wells	CBC Radio One	public news/talk
CFRD-FM	92.5 FM	Wells	Wells Community Radio Association (OBCI)	community radio
VF2277	98.1 FM	Wells	Wells Best Seniors Association	community-owned CBC Music rebroadcaster
CFMI-FM-1	90.7 FM	Whistler	Corus Entertainment	classic rock
CFOX-FM-1	92.3 FM	Whistler	Corus Entertainment	active rock
CJAX-FM-1	96.9 FM	Whistler	Rogers Communications	adult hits
CBYW-FM	100.1 FM	Whistler	CBC Radio One	public news/talk
CKEE-FM	101.5 FM	Whistler	Four Senses Entertainment Inc.	Contemporary hit radio
CISW-FM	102.1 FM	Whistler	Rogers Communications	hot adult contemporary
CBUF-FM-10	103.1 FM	Whistler	Ici Radio-Canada Première	public news/talk (French)
CKWL	570 AM	Williams Lake	Vista Broadcast Group	country
CBYK-FM-1	92.1 FM	Williams Lake	CBC Radio One	public news/talk
CISK-FM	94.3 FM	Williams Lake	Western Singh Sabha Association	multilingual
VF2519	95.1 FM	Williams Lake	The Seventh-day Adventist Church	Religious
VF2235	96.1 FM	Williams Lake	Northern Native Broadcasting	First Nations community radio
CFFM-FM	97.5 FM	Williams Lake	Vista Broadcast Group	active rock
CJLJ-FM	100.7 FM	Williams Lake	Sugar Cane Community Diversity Association	community radio
CBUJ-FM	91.7 FM	Winlaw	CBC Radio One	public news/talk
CBTW-FM	92.7 FM	Woss	CBC Radio One	public news/talk

== See also ==
- Lists of radio stations in North and Central America
