= CKAY =

CKAY may refer to:

- CKAY-FM, a Canadian radio station
- CJSU-FM, a Canadian station previously known as CKAY
- Ckay1, American music composer, arranger, and producer
- CKay, Nigerian singer and producer best known for "Love Nwantiti"
