= CKPP-FM =

Radio station in Prescott, Ontario

Coordinates: 44°38′23″N 75°37′13″W

- Prescott, Ontario; Canada
- Frequency: 107.9 MHz
- Branding: 107.9 Icon Radio

Programming
- Language: English
- Format: Variety hits

Ownership
- Owner: Vista Broadcast Group
- Sister stations: CKVV-FM

History
- First air date: October 20, 2015

Technical information
- Class: A
- ERP: 1 kW Average; 4.2 kW Maximum
- HAAT: 120 metres (390 ft)

Links
- Webcast: Listen Live
- Website: myprescottnow.com

CKPP-FM is a radio station which broadcasts a variety hits format on 107.9 MHz (FM) in Prescott, Ontario, Canada. CKPP's studio is located in Kemptville, while its transmitter is located near Prescott.

== History ==
On November 10, 2011, the CRTC approved an application by Haliburton Broadcasting Group for a new FM radio station serving Prescott, Ontario, proposing a hot adult contemporary format with local news and information. Prior to the station's launch, Haliburton Broadcasting Group was acquired by Vista Radio. The transaction was approved by the CRTC on October 19, 2012.

On October 20, 2015, CKPP launched as 107.9 Coast FM. In May 2026, after having since rebranded as classic hits Moose FM, the station rebranded again as 107.9 Icon Radio.
