= CKBZ-FM =

Radio station in Kamloops

Coordinates: 50°40′15″N 120°23′55″W

- Kamloops, British Columbia; Canada
- Frequency: 100.1 MHz
- Branding: B-100

Programming
- Format: Hot adult contemporary

Ownership
- Owner: Jim Pattison Group

History
- First air date: 1926
- Former call signs: CFJC (1926–2001)
- Former frequencies: 1120 kHz (AM) (1926–1937); 910 kHz (AM) (1937–1979); 550 kHz (AM) (1979–2001)
- Call sign meaning: Kamloops Buzz

Technical information
- Licensing authority: CRTC
- Class: B
- ERP: horizontal polarization only: 3.5 kWs
- HAAT: 147 metres (482 ft)

Links
- Webcast: Listen Live
- Website: b100.ca

CKBZ-FM is a radio station in Kamloops, British Columbia, Canada. Broadcasting at 100.1 FM, the station airs a hot adult contemporary format (per reporting status on Mediabase) branded as B-100. The station is currently owned by the Jim Pattison Group.

The station was first launched in 1926 as CFJC 1120 AM, owned by the local N. S. Dalgliesh & Son department store. It was acquired by the Kamloops Sentinel in 1932, and changed frequency the following year to 1310. The station became an affiliate of the Canadian Radio Broadcasting Commission, a corporate precursor to the CBC, and retained an affiliation with CBC Radio's main network afterward. Its frequency subsequently changed to 800 AM in 1934, 880 in 1935 and 910 in 1941. The Sentinel finally sold the station to Inland Broadcasters in 1957.

Sister station CFJC-FM was launched in 1962.

CFJC dropped its CBC affiliation in 1977 when the CBC launched CBYK-FM, then a local rebroadcaster of Vancouver's CBU. The station then moved to its final AM frequency, 550, in 1979.

CFJC and its FM sister station were acquired by the Jim Pattison Group, their current owner, in 1987. Pattison converted CFJC to its current FM frequency, adult contemporary format and call sign in 2001. By December 2010, the station switched formats to hot adult contemporary, dropping most classic hits from the playlist, and going head-to-head up against rock-leaning CHR/Top 40 station CKRV-FM (which had been hot AC up until 2010). CKBZ-FM had been a reporter on the Mediabase & Nielsen BDS Canadian hot adult contemporary panels before the switch to hot AC. CKBZ-FM was the last adult contemporary station reporter on the Mediabase Canadian hot AC panels, while the only non-hot AC stations on those panels such as CKRV-FM, CHSU-FM and CICF-FM were CHR instead.

== Rebroadcasters ==
Rebroadcasters of CKBZ-FM
City of licence	Identifier	Frequency	RECNet	CRTC Decision
Pritchard	CKBZ-FM-1	104.5 FM	Query	
Chase	CKBZ-FM-2	101.1 FM	Query	
Merritt	CKBZ-FM-3	99.5 FM	Query	
Clearwater	CKBZ-FM-4	102.9 FM	Query	88-15
Sun Peaks	CKBZ-FM-5	91.5 FM	Query	2003-494

The Logan Lake TV Society also rebroadcasts CKBZ at 91.1 FM in their area.
