= CBRL =

CBRL may refer to:

- The Council for British Research in the Levant
- CBRL Group, an American restaurant company
- CBRL (AM), a radio rebroadcaster (860 AM) licensed to Williams Lake, British Columbia, Canada, rebroadcasting CBTK-FM
- CBRL-FM, a radio rebroadcaster (100.1 FM) licensed to Lethbridge, Alberta, Canada, rebroadcasting CBR
