= CBXA =

CBXA may refer to:

- CBXA (AM), a radio rebroadcaster (1150 AM) licensed to Mica Dam, British Columbia, Canada, rebroadcasting CBTK-FM
- CBXA-FM, a radio station (103.5 FM) licensed to Chateh, Alberta, Canada
