= CHRT =

CHRT might refer to:

- Cambridge-Huntingdon Rapid Transit Scheme, a public transport project
- Canadian Human Rights Tribunal
- Chartered Semiconductor Manufacturing, a company
- CHRT-FM in Trail, British Columbia, Canada
- Hormone Replacement Therapy (HRT) having undergone compounding
