= CKCV-FM =

Coordinates: 49.0958°N 116.5098°W

- Creston, British Columbia; Canada
- Broadcast area: East Kootenay
- Frequency: 94.1 MHz
- Branding: 94.1 Juice FM

Programming
- Format: Hot adult contemporary

Ownership
- Owner: Vista Broadcast Group; (Vista Radio)
- Sister stations: CKQR-FM, CHNV-FM

History
- First air date: August 7, 2015
- Call sign meaning: Central Kootenay Creston Valley

Technical information
- Class: C1
- ERP: 1,100 watts average 2,800 watts peak
- HAAT: 602 metres (1,975 ft)

Links
- Webcast: Listen Live
- Website: mycrestonnow.com/juice-fm

CKCV-FM is a Canadian radio station broadcasting at 94.1 FM in Creston, British Columbia. The station plays a hot adult contemporary format branded as 94.1 Juice FM. The station is owned by Vista Radio.

The station received approval by the CRTC on August 9, 2013 and officially launched on August 7, 2015 at 1:00 PM with studios located at 1230 Canyon Street in Creston.

This is the only station of the seven stations "Juice FM" network to keep the "Greatest Hits" slogan, while the rest of the network now uses the "Biggest Variety" slogan.
