= CFNI =

CFNI may stand for:

- Christ for the Nations Institute, a Christian educational institute in Dallas, Texas
- CFNI (AM), a radio station in Port Hardy, British Columbia, Canada.
