= CJOR =

CJOR may refer to:

- CJOR (AM), a radio station (1240 AM) licensed to Osoyoos, British Columbia, Canada, with a repeater on 102.9 FM licensed to Oliver, British Columbia, Canada as CJOR-FM.
- CKPK-FM, a radio station (100.5 FM) licensed to Vancouver, British Columbia, Canada, which held the call sign CJOR from 1926 to 1988
