= CBWA =

CBWA may refer to:

- CBWA (AM), a defunct radio rebroadcaster (860 AM) licensed to Ashcroft, British Columbia, Canada, rebroadcasting CBTK-FM
- CBWA-FM, a radio rebroadcaster (101.3 FM) licensed to Manigotagan, Manitoba, Canada, rebroadcasting CBW
