= CBKM =

CBKM may refer to:

- CBKM (AM), a radio rebroadcaster (860 AM) licensed to Blue River, British Columbia, Canada, rebroadcasting CBTK-FM
- CBKM-FM, a radio rebroadcaster (98.5 FM) licensed to Meadow Lake, Saskatchewan, Canada, rebroadcasting CBK
