= C106 =

C106, C-106, or variation, may refer to:

- Xingu corydoras, C106, a species of South American "Corydoras" armoured catfish
- Caldwell 106 (C106), the designation for globular cluster of 47 Tucanae located in the constellation Tucana.
- C-106 Loadmaster, a prototype World War II twin-engined transport aircraft built by Cessna for the United States Army Air Forces
- CC-106 Yukon, the Royal Canadian Air Force designation for the Canadair CL-44
- Pahang State Route C106, Malaysia
- KWKZ (106.1 FM), "Coyote Country C-106", a Missouri, USA country music radio station
- CKVG-FM (106.5 FM), "C-106 Country", an Alberta, Canada country music radio station
- SpaceX Dragon C106, the first SpaceX Dragon space capsule to be reused
