= CFTK =

CFTK may refer to:

- CFTK (AM), a radio station (590 AM) licensed to Terrace, British Columbia, Canada
- CFTK-TV, a television station (channel 3) licensed to Terrace, British Columbia, Canada
