= CKKO-FM =

Radio station in Kelowna

Coordinates: 49°46′06″N 119°30′03″W

- Kelowna, British Columbia; Canada
- Broadcast area: Okanagan Valley
- Frequency: 96.3 MHz
- Branding: K 96.3

Programming
- Format: Classic rock

Ownership
- Owner: Stingray Group

History
- First air date: November 4, 2008
- Call sign meaning: Kelowna Okanagan

Technical information
- Licensing authority: CRTC
- Class: B
- ERP: 10,000 watts (average); 31,000 watts (peak)
- HAAT: 130.8 metres (429 ft)

Links
- Website: k963.ca

CKKO-FM (96.3 MHz) is a radio station in Kelowna, British Columbia, Canada. The station is owned by the Stingray Group, and broadcasts a classic rock format.

== History ==
Originally owned by Sun Country Cablevision and currently owned by Stingray Group, the station was licensed on March 14, 2008. The station officially launched on November 4, 2008, playing the song "You Ain't Seen Nothin' Yet" by Bachman-Turner Overdrive.

On February 26, 2009, Sun Country Radio Ltd. received CRTC approval to acquire the assets of the radio programming undertaking CKKO-FM Kelowna from Sun Country Cablevision Ltd.

On July 12, 2013, Newcap was denied a licence to change the authorized contours of CKKO by relocating its transmitter to a site on top of Okanagan Mountain and by changing its transmitter class from B to C and its average effective radiated power (ERP) from 10,000 to 6,300 watts (directional antenna with a decrease in maximum ERP from 31,000 to 14,100 watts and an increase in the effective height of the antenna above average terrain from 130.8 to 793 metres). The denial was because the station would focus more on the nearby city of Penticton, where it would compete with other stations in that market, while losing its focus on Kelowna. In addition, the CRTC felt that it would give an unfair advantage in that market, with Newcap already owning CIGV-FM in Penticton.
