= Clear Sky Radio =

Canadian broadcasting company

- Company type: Private
- Industry: Media
- Founded: 2006
- Defunct: 2018
- Headquarters: Lethbridge, Alberta
- Key people: Paul Larsen; President / CEO
- Products: Broadcasting
- Website: Clear Sky Radio

Clear Sky Radio was a Canadian broadcasting company that owned radio stations in Alberta and British Columbia. The company, headquartered in Lethbridge, Alberta, was incorporated in 2006 after it was granted its first radio license.

In January 2018, Clear Sky sold CJCY-FM in Medicine Hat to Rogers Media, and a 25% stake in the yet-to-have-launched CKOV-FM in Strathmore to Golden West Broadcasting (with Clear Sky's co-owners Paul Larsen and Mary McKinnon Mills retaining a majority stake). In December 2018, it was announced that Vista Radio would purchase the remaining Clear Sky Radio stations.

== Stations ==
=== Alberta ===
- Lethbridge - CKBD-FM, CJOC-FM
- Medicine Hat - CJCY-FM
- Strathmore - CKOV-FM

=== British Columbia ===
- Cranbrook - CFSM-FM
