= CKGF-FM =

Radio station in Grand Forks, British Columbia

Coordinates: 49.0330°N 118.4420°W

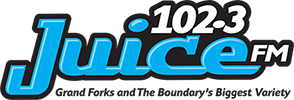

Grand Forks, British Columbia; Canada
- Broadcast area: Kootenays
- Frequency: 102.3 MHz
- Branding: 102.3 Juice FM

Programming
- Format: Adult Hits

Ownership
- Owner: Vista Broadcast Group; (Vista Radio)

History
- First air date: June 1969 (Note: The current originating station was authorized in 2014. From 2004 to 2014, the originating transmitter was CKGF-2-FM in Greenwood.)
- Call sign meaning: Grand Forks (broadcast area)

Technical information
- Class: A
- ERP: 0.589 kW average 1.043 kW peak
- HAAT: −353 metres (−1,158 ft)

Links
- Webcast: Listen Live
- Website: mygrandforksnow.com

CKGF-FM is a Canadian radio station that broadcasts an English-language commercial active rock format at 102.3 MHz (FM) in Grand Forks, British Columbia. The station is currently owned by Vista Broadcast Group.

== History ==
Okanagan Radio Limited (with headquarters in Penticton) originally launched CKGF at 1340 kHz (AM) in Grand Forks in June 1969.

In 1984, CKGF received CRTC approval to add new FM transmitters in Christina Lake, Greenwood and Rock Creek. The rebroadcast transmitters were on the air by the late 1980s. Around that time, CKGF began operating as a semi-satellite of CJAT in Trail. In 1993, CKGF began simulcasting programs of CKQR Castlegar.

On August 18, 2004, Boundary Broadcasting was authorized to delete the originating CKGF Grand Forks transmitter, which was already off the air. CKGF-2-FM Greenwood became the originating station for repeaters CKGF-1-FM Christina Lake, and CKGF-3-FM Rock Creek. The arrangement became official on January 16, 2007.

On March 3, 2014, the CRTC approved Vista's application to operate a new originating station in Grand Forks, which the current CKGF transmitters in Greenwood, Rock Creek and Christina Lake would rebroadcast. The new station will operate at 102.3 MHz with an average effective radiated power (ERP) of 589 watts (maximum ERP of 1,043 watts with an effective height of antenna above average terrain of -353 metres).

On March 10, 2016, at 1 p.m., the station dropped the CKQR-FM simulcast and flipped to adult hits as 102.3 Juice FM.

== Rebroadcasters ==
Rebroadcasters of CKGF-2-FM
City of licence	Identifier	Frequency	RECNet	CRTC Decision
Christina Lake	CKGF-1-FM	93.3 FM	Query	
Rock Creek	CKGF-3-FM	103.7 FM	Query	
