= CHBY-FM =

Radio station in Barry's Bay, Ontario

Coordinates: 45°29′23″N 77°43′34″W

- Barry's Bay, Ontario; Canada
- Broadcast area: Madawaska Valley
- Frequency: 106.5 MHz
- Branding: 106.5 ICON Radio

Programming
- Format: Classic hits

Ownership
- Owner: Vista Broadcast Group

History
- First air date: October 16, 2015

Technical information
- Class: B
- ERP: 12,000 watts
- HAAT: 127 meters (417 ft)

Links
- Webcast: Listen Live
- Website: mybarrysbaynow.com

CHBY-FM is a Canadian radio station which broadcasts a classic hits format on the frequency of 106.5 MHz in Barry's Bay, Ontario. This is Barry's Bay's first commercial FM radio station.

Owned by the Haliburton Broadcasting Group, the station received CRTC approval on January 12, 2011.

The stations' new call sign will be CHBY-FM with the "Moose FM" branding and a launch date for the new radio station has yet to be announced.

On April 23, 2012 Vista Broadcast Group, which owns a number of radio stations in western Canada, announced a deal to acquire Haliburton Broadcasting, in cooperation with Westerkirk Capital. The transaction was approved by the CRTC on October 19, 2012.

In 2013, Vista had until January 12, 2014, to get CHBY on the air. The station was granted a second extension date of October 19, 2015 to get the station on the air.

CHBY-FM as 106.5 Moose FM from 2015 to 2026

CHBY officially signed on the air at 12:00 PM on October 16, 2015, branded as 106.5 Moose FM. The station has a classic hits format and broadcasts from the CBC tower just outside Barry's Bay with an ERP of 12,000 watts.

In May 2026, CHBY-FM rebranded as 106.5 ICON Radio retaining the format.
