= CFPW-FM =

Radio station in Powell River, British Columbia

Coordinates: 49°41′54″N 124°26′05″W

- Powell River, British Columbia; Canada
- Frequency: 95.7 MHz
- Branding: 95.7 Coast FM

Programming
- Format: Classic hits
- Affiliations: Powell River Kings

Ownership
- Owner: Vista Broadcast Group

History
- First air date: 1967
- Former call signs: CHQB
- Former frequencies: 1280 kHz (1967–2008)
- Call sign meaning: PW for Powell

Technical information
- Class: B
- ERP: 1,183 watts average 5,798 watts peak horizontal polarization only
- HAAT: 416 metres (1,365 ft)

Links
- Webcast: Listen Live
- Website: mypowellrivernow.com

CFPW-FM is a Canadian radio station broadcasting at 95.7 FM in Powell River, British Columbia, with a classic hits format branded as 95.7 Coast FM. The station is owned by Vista Broadcast Group.

== History ==
The station began broadcasting in 1967 at 1280 AM with the call sign CHQB. The station was originally owned by Sunshine Coast Broadcasting ltd and was later acquired by Vista Broadcast Group in 2005. On May 18, 2007 the station received approval from the CRTC to convert to 94.1 FM, but the application was denied. On November 1, 2007, the station was given approval to use the frequency 95.7 FM.

The station relaunched as an FM station on August 27, 2008.
