= CFFM-FM =

Radio station in Williams Lake, British Columbia

- Williams Lake, British Columbia; Canada
- Broadcast area: Cariboo
- Frequency: 97.5 MHz
- Branding: The Goat

Programming
- Format: Active rock

Ownership
- Owner: Vista Broadcast Group; (Vista Radio)

History
- First air date: August 31, 1987

Technical information
- Class: A
- ERP: 462 watts (peak); 176 watts (average) horizontal polarization only
- HAAT: 125 metres (410 ft)
- Transmitter coordinates: 52.1153°N 122.188°W
- Repeater: CFFM-FM-1 99.7 100 Mile House CFFM-FM-2 94.9 Quesnel

Links
- Webcast: Listen Live
- Website: mycariboonow.com/the-goat

CFFM-FM is a Canadian radio station broadcasting at 97.5 FM in Williams Lake, British Columbia, with an active rock format as The Goat. The station also rebroadcasts at 94.9 FM in Quesnel and at 99.7 FM in 100 Mile House.

CFFM-FM is owned by Vista Broadcast Group.

== History ==
The station was approved by CRTC in 1986 and was launched August 31, 1987, originally with a country format. Over the years the station went through different ownerships and music formats. In July 2014, the station became known as 97.5 The Goat with an active rock format.

== Transmitters ==
Rebroadcasters of CFFM-FM
City of licence	Identifier	Frequency	Power	Class	RECNet	CRTC Decision
100 Mile House	CFFM-FM-1	99.7 FM	80 watts	B	Query	
Quesnel	CFFM-FM-2	94.9 FM	175 watts	B	Query	86-1019
