= CJFW-FM =

Radio station in Terrace, British Columbia

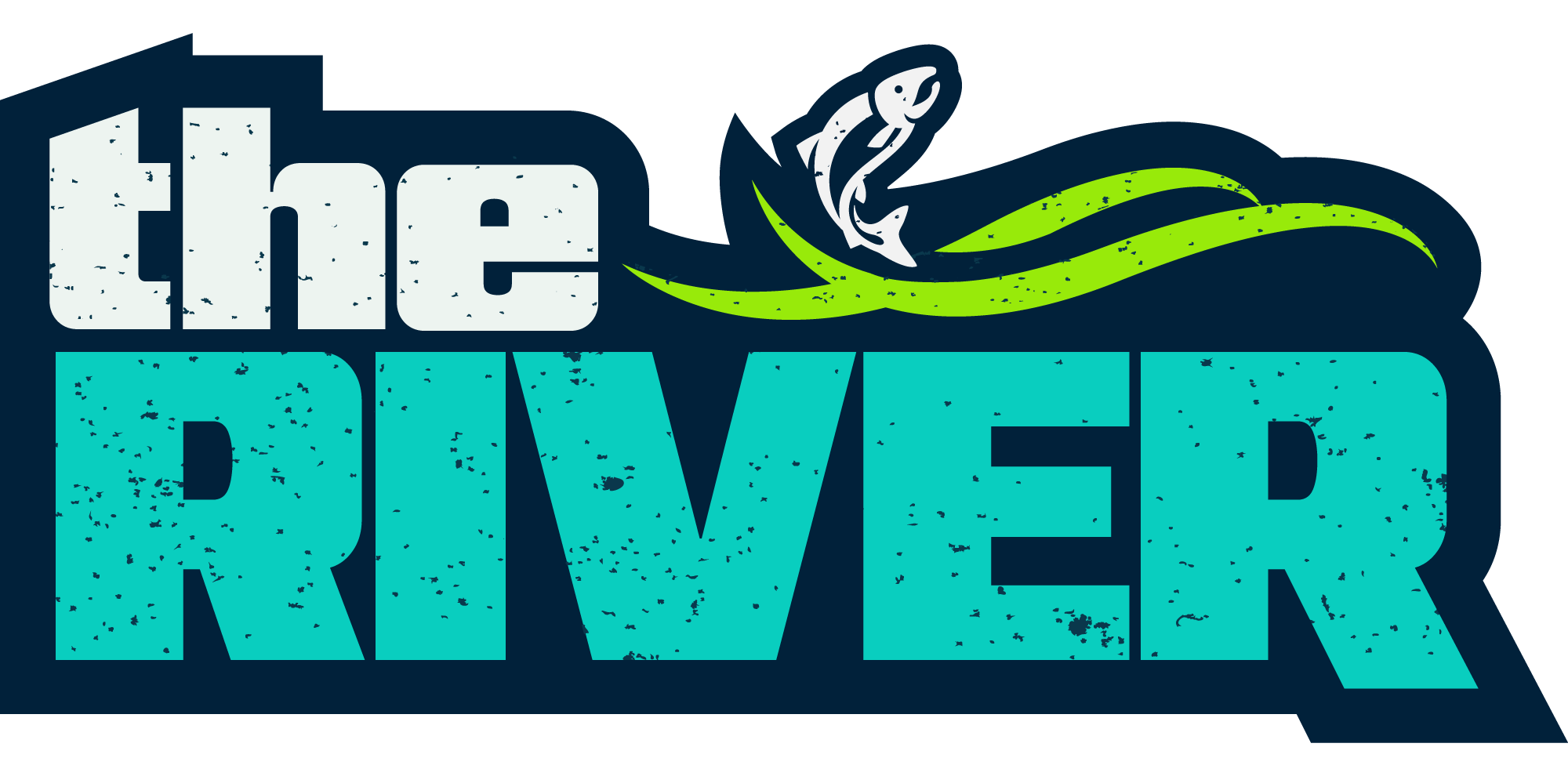
- Terrace, British Columbia; Canada
- Frequency: 103.1 MHz
- Branding: 103.1 The River

Programming
- Format: Country
- Affiliations: Premiere Networks; Vancouver Canucks

Ownership
- Owner: Vista Radio
- Sister stations: CFTK

History
- First air date: 1983

Technical information
- Class: B
- ERP: 3,160 watts peak 1,550 watts average
- HAAT: 451 metres (1,480 ft)
- Transmitter coordinates: 54°31′4.08″N 128°28′22.80″W

Links
- Webcast: Listen Live
- Website: The River

CJFW-FM is a Canadian radio station, airing at 103.1 FM in Terrace, British Columbia. It is owned by Vista Radio, broadcasting a country format to communities throughout northwestern B.C.

== History ==
The station began broadcasting in 1983 under Skeena Broadcasters. Around 1987, the corporate name changed to Okanagan Skeena Group Limited. In 1999, Telemedia Radio Inc. purchased Okanagan Skeena Group Ltd. In 2002, Standard Radio Inc. purchased the Western and Ontario operations of Telemedia. Some stations were then sold to other companies but Standard Radio retained the Okanagan Skeena group. On September 27, 2007, Astral Media Radio received CRTC approval to acquire the assets of the radio and television undertakings owned by Standard Radio Ltd., subject to certain conditions. The purchase included CJFW-FM.

On May 28, 2019, as part of a country-wide format reorganization by Bell Media, CJFW rebranded as Pure Country.

On February 8, 2024, Bell announced a restructuring that included the sale of 45 of its 103 radio stations to seven buyers, subject to approval by the CRTC, including CJFW, to be sold to Vista Radio. The application was approved on February 13, 2025. On April 14, 2025, Vista rebranded CJFW as 103.1 The River with no change in format.

== Rebroadcasters ==
CJFW-FM has the following rebroadcasters:

Rebroadcasters of CJFW-FM
City of licence	Identifier	Frequency	Power	Class	CRTC Decision
Kitimat	CJFW-FM-1	92.9 FM	170 watts	A1	
Prince Rupert	CJFW-FM-2	101.9 FM	1,750 watts	B	
Sandspit	CJFW-FM-3	92.9 FM	13 watts	LP	
Masset	CJFW-FM-4	92.9 FM	50 watts	LP	
Burns Lake	CJFW-FM-5	92.9 FM	50 watts	LP	Decision CRTC 86-714
Smithers	CJFW-FM-6	92.9 FM	50 watts	LP	Decision CRTC 86-716
Houston	CJFW-FM-7	105.5 FM	3,470 watts	B	Decision CRTC 86-715
Hazelton	CJFW-FM-8	101.9 FM	50 watts	LP	Decision CRTC 89-887
Granisle	VF2352	103.3 FM	32 watts	LP	Decision CRTC 99-36
