= CHOR-FM =

Radio station in Summerland, British Columbia

Coordinates: 49°39′34″N 119°34′22″W

- Summerland, British Columbia; Canada
- Frequency: 98.5 MHz
- Branding: 98.5 Summit

Programming
- Format: Classic hits

Ownership
- Owner: Vista Radio

History
- First air date: 1972
- Former call signs: CKSP (1972–1991)
- Former frequencies: 1450 kHz (1972–2010)

Technical information
- Class: A
- ERP: 100 watts

CHOR-FM is a Canadian radio station that broadcasts an adult hits format at 98.5 FM in Summerland, British Columbia. The station is owned by Vista Radio and is branded as 98.5 Summit.

CHOR began as CKSP at 1450 AM in 1972, as a part-time satellite re-broadcaster of CKOK in Penticton. Okanagan Radio Limited put the station on the air to improve coverage to the north. The first manager of the station was Russ Mitten, who was succeeded by Jim Hart, who became Member of Parliament. The station originally broadcast local programming from 6 a.m. to 9 a.m. and eventually from 6 a.m. to 5 p.m.

The CKSP call sign was changed by new owners in 1991.

== Switch to FM ==
Former CHOR AM logo.

On June 17, 2010, CHOR received approval by the CRTC to convert CHOR AM 1450 to the FM band at 98.5 MHz to broadcast an adult contemporary format targeting adults aged 18 to 54.

Former logo as "98.5 EZ Rock"

The move from 1450 AM to the new 98.5 FM frequency took place November 24, 2010. The station was then rebranded as 98.5 EZ Rock. 1450 was shut down in December.

As part of a mass format reorganization by Bell Media, on May 18, 2021, CHOR flipped to adult hits under the Bounce branding.

On February 8, 2024, Bell announced a restructuring that included the sale of 45 of its 103 radio stations to seven buyers, subject to approval by the CRTC, including CHOR, to be sold to Vista Radio. The application was approved on February 13, 2025.

The sale took effect April 14, 2025 and Vista rebranded the station to Classic Hits as 98.5 Summit.
