= CKEE-FM =

Coordinates: 50.0792°N 123.0170°W

- Whistler, British Columbia; Canada
- Frequency: 101.5 MHz
- Branding: 101.5 Whistler FM

Programming
- Format: Top 40/CHR

Ownership
- Owner: Four Senses Entertainment Inc.
- Sister stations: CFTW-FM

History
- First air date: February 25, 2013
- Call sign meaning: Sounds like "ski"

Links
- Webcast: Listen Live
- Website: whistlerfm.ca

CKEE-FM is a Canadian radio station broadcasting at 101.5 FM in Whistler, British Columbia, British Columbia with a Top 40/CHR format branded on-air as 101.5 Whistler FM.

== History ==
Owned by Four Senses Entertainment Inc., the station was licensed by the CRTC on March 2, 2009. On February 25, 2013, CKEE began broadcasting.
