= CKAY-FM =

Radio station in Gibsons, British Columbia

Coordinates: 49°09′02″N 124°02′55″W

- Gibsons, British Columbia; Canada
- Broadcast area: Sunshine Coast; Central Vancouver Island
- Frequency: 91.7 MHz
- Branding: 91.7 ICON Radio

Programming
- Format: Classic hits

Ownership
- Owner: Vista Radio

History
- First air date: May 20, 2006
- Call sign meaning: CKAY, a radio station in Duncan, now CJSU-FM

Technical information
- Class: C1
- ERP: vertical polarization: 260 watts average 1200 watts peak horizontal polarization: 600 watts average 2100 watts peak
- HAAT: 759 metres (2,490 ft)

Links
- Webcast: Listen Live
- Website: mycoastnow.com

CKAY-FM is a Canadian radio station that broadcasts a classic hits format at 91.7 FM, licensed to Gibsons, British Columbia with studios in Sechelt. The station targets Nanaimo and the Sunshine Coast.

Originally owned and operated by Westwave Broadcasting, the station was given approval by the CRTC on April 20, 2005.

CKAY previously had an adult contemporary format until June 2010, when the station switched to its current classic hits format. Although the signal is receivable in much of Greater Vancouver, the station does not target Vancouver itself. On March 15, 2024, the station rebranded to "91.7 ICON Radio" but retained the same format.

The station's transmitter is on Mount Benson, west of Nanaimo on Vancouver Island.

The station is currently owned by Vista Radio.
