= CHLW-FM =

Radio station in British Columbia, Canada

Coordinates: 51.1817°N 120.124°W

CHLW-FM is a commercial community radio station which operates at 93.1 MHz/FM in Barriere, British Columbia, Canada. HAAT (Height above average terrain): -144.5 m, Ground Level at Tower Base: 384 m, Overall Height Above Ground: 6 m.

The station was started by veteran broadcaster Stephen Guay, who received approval from the CRTC on December 10, 2013. The station broadcasts with an average effective radiated power of 13.5 watts (non-directional antenna with an effective height of antenna above average terrain of -144.5 metres). The proposed music format will primarily consist of pop, light rock, country and standard hits, plus world beat, experimental, acoustic, easy listening, folk, and jazz and blues music, as well as special music programming. The station brands its station as "THE BEAR". It was sold to Kenneth Collin Brown in 2017.

Guay is a retired broadcaster with 43 years of experience in the industry, most notably in the Montreal area as Steve Shannon.
