= CKVV-FM =

Radio station in Kemptville, Ontario

Coordinates: 45.03804°N 75.59053°W

- Kemptville, Ontario; Canada
- Broadcast area: North Grenville
- Frequency: 97.5 MHz
- Branding: 97.5 Moose FM

Programming
- Format: Variety hits

Ownership
- Owner: Vista Broadcast Group

History
- First air date: February 27, 2012
- Call sign meaning: Canada Kemptville Vista

Technical information
- Class: A
- ERP: 2,800 watts maximum
- HAAT: 89 metres (292 ft)

Links
- Webcast: Listen Live
- Website: mykemptvillenow.com

CKVV-FM is a Canadian radio station broadcasting a variety hits format on the frequency of 97.5 MHz (FM) in Kemptville, Ontario. The station is branded as 97.5 Moose FM.

== History ==
On December 13, 2010, the Haliburton Broadcasting Group applied to operate a new FM radio station in Kemptville at 97.5 MHz. This application received CRTC approval on April 21, 2011.

=== Launches as Star FM ===
Original logo as Star FM 97.5 Kemptville 2012-2014

The station is Kemptville's first local commercial FM radio station. The station launched on February 27, 2012. The station was branded as Star 97.5.

It is also the third English-language AC station serving the National Capital Region; the others are CJMJ-FM and CJWL-FM.

On April 23, 2012 Vista Broadcast Group, which owns a number of radio stations in western Canada, announced a deal to acquire Haliburton Broadcasting, in cooperation with Westerkirk Capital. The transaction was approved by the CRTC on October 19, 2012.

=== Juice FM ===
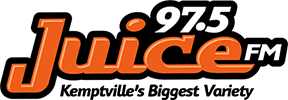
97.5 Juice FM logo 2014-2020

On September 9, 2014, the station changed its branding to Juice FM with a variety hits format.

=== Moose FM ===
On October 23, 2020, the station once again changed its branding to 97.5 Moose FM retaining its variety hits format.

== Technical Issues ==
The station may receive interference from a 97 kilowatt radio station, WFRY, out of Watertown, New York. The 97.5 FM frequency was also used for a low-power tourism station in Ottawa with the call sign VF2516.
