= CKBX =

Radio station in 100 Mile House, British Columbia

- 100 Mile House, British Columbia; Canada
- Broadcast area: Cariboo
- Frequency: 840 kHz
- Branding: Country 840

Programming
- Format: Country

Ownership
- Owner: Vista Broadcast Group; (Vista Radio, Ltd.)

History
- First air date: 1971

Technical information
- Class: B
- Power: 1 kW (day); 0.5 kW (night)
- Transmitter coordinates: 51.6697°N 121.291°W

Links
- Webcast: Listen Live
- Website: mycariboonow.com/country-840-am

CKBX is a Canadian radio station, which broadcasts at 840 AM in 100 Mile House, British Columbia. Owned by Vista Broadcast Group, the station airs a country format and is branded as Country 840.

== History ==
The station's license was issued on December 15, 1970, to Cariboo Broadcasters Ltd., which owned several other stations. The license permitted Cariboo to operate a new AM radio station at 100 Mile House. It was allotted a frequency of 1240 kHz with a transmission power of 250 watts. Cariboo Broadcasters launched the station in 1971.

In 1975, approval was granted for the station to increase its daytime transmission power from 250 to 1,000 watts.

On October 9, 1985, the CRTC permitted Cariboo to change CKBX's frequency from to 840 kHz and increase the nighttime power from 250 watts to 500 watts.

On October 4, 2004 at 8:00am, CKBX changed its branding from Wild Country to The Wolf, playing modern country and southern rock music.

In 2005, Cariboo Broadcasters was acquired by the Vista Broadcast Group.

In 2008, CKBX was converted to a stand-alone radio station serving 100 Mile House and area, becoming Country 840.

== See also ==
- CKCQ-FM
