= CIQC-FM =

Radio station in Campbell River, British Columbia

Coordinates: 50°03′15″N 125°19′30″W

- Campbell River, British Columbia; Canada
- Frequency: 99.7 MHz
- Branding: 99.7 The River

Programming
- Format: Hot adult contemporary

Ownership
- Owner: Vista Broadcast Group; (Vista Radio)

History
- First air date: September 10, 1963
- Former call signs: CFWB (1963–2008)
- Former frequencies: 1490 kHz (1963–2008)

Technical information
- Class: A
- ERP: 6 kW
- HAAT: 110 metres (360 ft)

Links
- Webcast: Listen Live
- Website: mycampbellrivernow.com

CIQC-FM is a Canadian radio station that broadcasts a hot adult contemporary format at 99.7 FM in Campbell River, British Columbia. The station was originally known as 99.7 The River with an adult contemporary format before rebranding as 99.7 2day FM and is owned by Vista Radio.

The station originally began broadcasting at 1490 AM in 1963, with the call sign CFWB. On August 30, 2007, the Canadian Radio-television and Telecommunications Commission (CRTC) partially approved an application by Vista Broadcast Group to convert the station to the FM band but required the station to choose a different frequency than it had originally applied for. The station subsequently applied for the 99.7 frequency, which was approved on March 19, 2008.

On December 10, 2008, CFWB moved from the AM band to the FM band and rebranded itself as 99.7 The River. CFWB's callsign was changed to CIQC-FM on the same day.

In the summer of 2014, the station rebranded as 99.7 2day FM, with a hot adult contemporary format.

In September 2021, the station rebranded back to 99.7 The River.

== Rebroadcasters ==
Rebroadcasters of CIQC-FM
City of licence	Identifier	Frequency	RECNet	CRTC Decision
Gold River	CJGR-FM	100.1 FM	Query	88-851
