= CIRX-FM =

Radio station in Prince George, British Columbia

Coordinates: 53°54′10″N 122°42′12″W

- Prince George, British Columbia; Canada
- Frequency: 94.3 MHz
- Branding: 94.3 The Goat

Programming
- Format: Active rock
- Affiliations: Prince George Cougars

Ownership
- Owner: Vista Radio
- Sister stations: CJCI-FM

History
- First air date: 1983
- Former call signs: CIBC (1983–19??)
- Call sign meaning: Canadian Independent Radio X (former branding)

Technical information
- Licensing authority: CRTC
- Class: C
- ERP: 11,480 watts; horizontal polarization only
- HAAT: 69.5 metres (228 ft)

Links
- Webcast: Listen live
- Website: www.myprincegeorgenow.com

CIRX-FM is a Canadian radio station broadcasting at 94.3 FM in Prince George, British Columbia, Canada. The station airs an active rock format branded on-air as 94.3 The Goat.

== History ==
The station was launched in 1983 with the call sign CIBC, and was later changed to CIRX. It had most of the time been Prince George's only rock station until 2003, when CKDV-FM (formerly CKPG) launched with a classic rock format. By 2004, the station began moving towards an active/alternative rock format, but mellowed out by the late 2000s. As of 2011, due to CKDV switching to classic hits, CIRX-FM is once again the only rock station in Prince George.

CIRX is currently owned by Vista Broadcast Group, which also owns CJCI-FM.

On May 30, 2014, the station was rebranded as 94.3 The Goat with no change in format.

In March 2018, CIRX's repeater in Vanderhoof became a full-time feed of CIVH after the station's transmitter was damaged.
