= CKTK-FM =

Radio station in Kitimat, British Columbia

Coordinates: 54°03′07″N 128°36′42″W

- Kitimat, British Columbia; Canada
- Frequency: 97.7 MHz
- Branding: 97.7 Summit

Programming
- Format: Adult hits

Ownership
- Owner: Vista Radio

History
- First air date: 1964
- Former frequencies: 1230 kHz (1964–2004)
- Call sign meaning: Canada Knows Terrace and Kitimat

Technical information
- Class: A1
- ERP: 170 watts

Links
- Webcast: https://radioplayer.vistaradio.ca/cktk]

CKTK-FM is a Canadian radio station that broadcasts a classic hits format at 97.7 FM in Kitimat, British Columbia. The station is branded as 97.7 Summit. CKTK is owned by Vista Radio.

The station originally began broadcasting in 1964 at 1230 AM, until the move to 97.7 on the FM dial was made in 2004.

In 2011, CKTK was rebranded as EZ Rock.

As part of a mass format reorganization by Bell Media, on May 18, 2021, CKTK flipped to adult hits, and adopted the Bounce branding.

On February 8, 2024, Bell announced a restructuring that included the sale of 45 of its 103 radio stations to seven buyers, subject to approval by the CRTC, including CKTK, which is to be sold to Vista Radio. The application was approved on February 13, 2025.

The sale took effect April 14, 2025 and Vista rebranded the station to Classic Hits as 97.7 Summit.

== Past station logo ==
CKTK-FM logo, used under previous station brand The Mix until October 2011.
