= CKCQ-FM =

Radio station in Quesnel, British Columbia

Coordinates: 52°59′22″N 122°33′57″W

- Quesnel, British Columbia; Canada
- Broadcast area: Cariboo
- Frequency: 100.3 MHz
- Branding: Cariboo Country

Programming
- Format: Country

Ownership
- Owner: Vista Radio

History
- First air date: 1957
- Call sign meaning: Cariboo Quesnel

Technical information
- Class: A
- ERP: 1.8 kW (FM) horizontal polarization only
- HAAT: 64 metres (210 ft)
- Repeater: CKWL (570 kHz) Williams Lake (1 kW)

Links
- Website: mycariboonow.com/country-fm

CKCQ-FM is a Canadian radio station, which broadcasts at 100.3 FM in Quesnel, British Columbia. Owned by Vista Broadcast Group, the station has a country format and is branded as Cariboo Country. It also has a repeater in Williams Lake (CKWL 570 AM).

The station was launched in 1957 by Cariboo Broadcasters on 570 AM. The Williams Lake transmitter was added in 1960, and a 100 Mile House transmitter was added in 1971. The Quesnel station changed to 920 AM in 1980, and the 570 AM frequency was allocated to CKWL in Williams Lake where it remains today. In 2004, CKCQ migrated to its current FM frequency and abandoned its 920 AM frequency.

The 100 Mile station, CKBX, was converted to a stand-alone station serving 100 Mile and area exclusively in 2008. The old AM transmitter is gone and the tower serves as the mast for the FM antenna which is located on the edge of a private residence near the Pinnacles on Stubbington Road. The FM station now transmits at 100.3 MHz with an effective radiated power of 1.8 kilowatts.

Vista acquired the stations from Cariboo Communications in 2005. In 2007 the radio station moved to its new location at 410 Kinchant in downtown Quesnel. The station was branded The Wolf but changed to Cariboo Country in 2014.

== Repeater ==
- Williams Lake: CKWL 570, (1,000 watts, Class B)
