= CJIB-FM =

Radio station in Vernon, British Columbia

Coordinates: 50°13′27″N 119°18′12″W

- Vernon, British Columbia; Canada
- Frequency: 107.5 MHz (FM)
- Branding: Beach Radio 107.5

Programming
- Format: Adult hits
- Affiliations: Vernon Vipers

Ownership
- Owner: Jim Pattison Group

History
- First air date: 1947
- Former call signs: CJIB (1947–2001); CKIS-FM (2001–2003); CKIZ-FM (2003–2018)
- Former frequencies: 940 kHz (1947–2001)

Technical information
- Class: C1
- ERP: 45,000 watts average 100,000 watts peak (horizontal signal only)
- HAAT: 71.2 metres (234 ft)

Links
- Website: vernonmatters.ca/radio-3/

CJIB-FM (107.5 MHz) is a radio station in Vernon, British Columbia, Canada. Owned by the Jim Pattison Group, it broadcasts an adult hits format branded as Beach Radio 107.5.

== History ==
The station began broadcasting in 1947 as CJIB at AM 940 kHz and went through different ownerships over the years. The station was affiliated to CBC Radio's Dominion Network from 1949 until 1962. On March 15, 2001, CJIB was converted to the FM band at 107.5 MHz becoming Vernon's first ever FM radio station.

In late 2001, CJIB adopted new call letters as CKIS which lasted until 2003 (now assigned to a station in Toronto), at which time it took the callsign CKIZ, and changed formats to hot adult contemporary. CKIZ-FM reverted to AC in 2007.

On February 25, 2005, Rogers Radio was given approval by the CRTC to add a 10 watt FM transmitter at Enderby at 93.9 MHz to rebroadcast the programming of CKIZ-FM, which was no longer receivable there after its conversion from the AM band in 2001.

In 2010, the station was sold to the Jim Pattison Group.

Former "Kiss FM" logo used until 2017

On December 14, 2017, the station re-branded from 107.5 Kiss FM to Beach Radio 107.5, flipping to adult hits. The station also returned to its legacy CJIB calls.

== Rebroadcasters ==
Rebroadcasters of CKIZ-FM
City of licence	Identifier	Frequency	Power
Enderby	CKIZ-FM-1	93.9 FM	? watts
