= CFBV =

Radio station in Smithers, British Columbia

Coordinates: 54°47′46″N 127°11′55″W

- Smithers, British Columbia; Canada
- Broadcast area: Bulkley-Nechako
- Frequency: 870 kHz
- Branding: The Moose

Programming
- Format: Variety hits

Ownership
- Owner: Vista Radio

History
- First air date: 1963
- Call sign meaning: Bulkley Valley

Technical information
- Class: B
- Power: 1,000 watts daytime 500 watts nighttime
- Repeaters: CHBV-FM 106.5 Houston; CFLD 760 Burns Lake

Links
- Webcast: Listen Live
- Website: mybulkleylakesnow.com

CFBV is a Canadian radio station that broadcasts a variety hits format and branded as The Moose at 870 AM in Smithers, British Columbia. The station is owned by Vista Radio.

== History ==
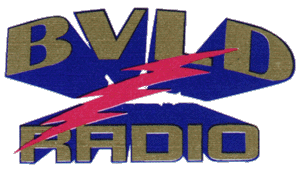
Logo used while branded as BV/LD Radio.

CFBV originally began broadcasting in 1963 at 1230 AM under the ownership of CFBV Ltd. from the Corner of Queen Street and Highway 16. Several years later the station moved to the former School Board offices on Queen Street at First Avenue in Smithers. Throughout its history, CFBV has broadcast with 1000 watts of power. The station opened a rebroadcaster, CFLD, at 1400 AM with 250 watts of power in the Tweedsmuir Hotel in Burns Lake in November 1965. CFBV added another rebroadcaster, CKBV in Hazelton, and CHLD in Granisle (a rebroadcaster of CFLD), in 1974.

In 1976, CFLD's studios moved from the Tweedsmuir Hotel to a new studio at 320-A Alaska Drive. Around the same time, CFBV Ltd. was granted permission to increase the daytime power of CFLD to 1000 watts (while nighttime power remained at 250 watts). CFBV Ltd. changed its corporate name to Cariboo Central Interior Radio Inc. in 1985, and CFBV and CFLD began operating under a common brand, BV/LD Radio, around that time, with some programming for both stations originating from CJCI in Prince George.

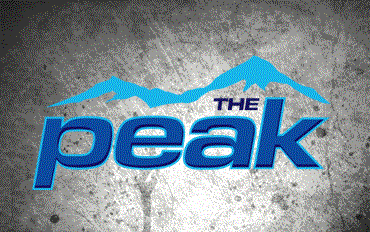
Logo used while branded as The Peak.

CFBV changed frequencies from 1230 to its present 870 on October 17, 1985, and CFLD followed suit on January 27, 1986, when it switched frequencies from 1400 to 760. CFBV established another rebroadcaster, CHBV, in Houston, in 1991. CFLD increased its power to 1000 watts full-time on January 9, 1996. On December 17, 1999, CFBV switched CHBV to 106.5 MHz with 923 watts of power.

Cariboo Central Interior Radio, the owner of CFBV, CFLD, CJCI and their rebroadcasters and other stations, was purchased on September 1, 2005, by 1126144 Alberta Ltd., a company affiliated with Vista. In early summer of 2006, CFBV and CFLD dropped its BV/LD branding for a new common brand, The Peak. On June 6, 2014, the station branding changed to The Moose.

In October, 2023, the station celebrated its 60th anniversary. Through the month, the station's history was talked about and callbacks were made to events that occurred in their broadcast region during that time. On October 25, several former announcers, news reporters, and other staff could were brought back in the morning to talk about their experiences working for the station, with the afternoon spent at a local brewery where they celebrated with the community.

== Rebroadcasters ==
In 2017, Vista Radio has voluntarily surrendered the licenses for all of their low-power 50 watt AM transmitters in British Columbia. Vista stated that the transmitting equipment for these facilities are in state of disrepair and would not be economically viable to replace them. The former rebroadcasters affected were:

- CHLD 1480 Granisle
- CKBV 1490 New Hazelton
