= CHTK-FM =

Radio station in Prince Rupert, British Columbia

Coordinates: 54°17′04″N 130°18′54″W

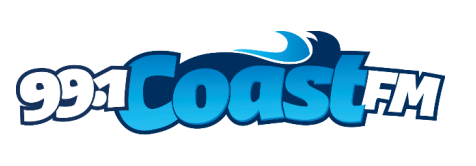
- Prince Rupert, British Columbia; Canada
- Frequency: 99.1 MHz
- Branding: 99.1 Coast FM

Programming
- Format: Classic hits

Ownership
- Owner: Vista Radio

History
- First air date: 1965
- Former frequencies: 560 kHz (1965–2011)

Technical information
- Class: A
- ERP: 160 watts
- HAAT: 578 metres (1,896 ft)

Links
- Webcast: Listen Live

CHTK-FM is a Canadian radio station that broadcasts a classic hits format at 99.1 FM in Prince Rupert, British Columbia. The station is branded as 99.1 Coast FM. CHTK is owned by Vista Radio.

The station has been broadcasting at its current frequency since October 21, 2011. It previously broadcast at 560 kHz from its first sign-on in 1965 until 2011.

== History ==
On January 11, 2011, CHTK received Canadian Radio-television and Telecommunications Commission approval to convert CHTK to 99.1 MHz.

As part of a mass format reorganization by Bell Media, on May 18, 2021, CHTK flipped to adult hits, and adopted the Bounce branding.

On February 8, 2024, Bell announced a restructuring that included the sale of 45 of its 103 radio stations to seven buyers, subject to approval by the CRTC, including CHTK, which was sold to Vista Radio. The application was approved on February 13, 2025. On April 14, 2025, the station rebranded under Vista's Coast FM brand with no change in format.
