= CJMG-FM =

Radio station in Penticton

Coordinates: 49°31′44″N 119°38′29″W

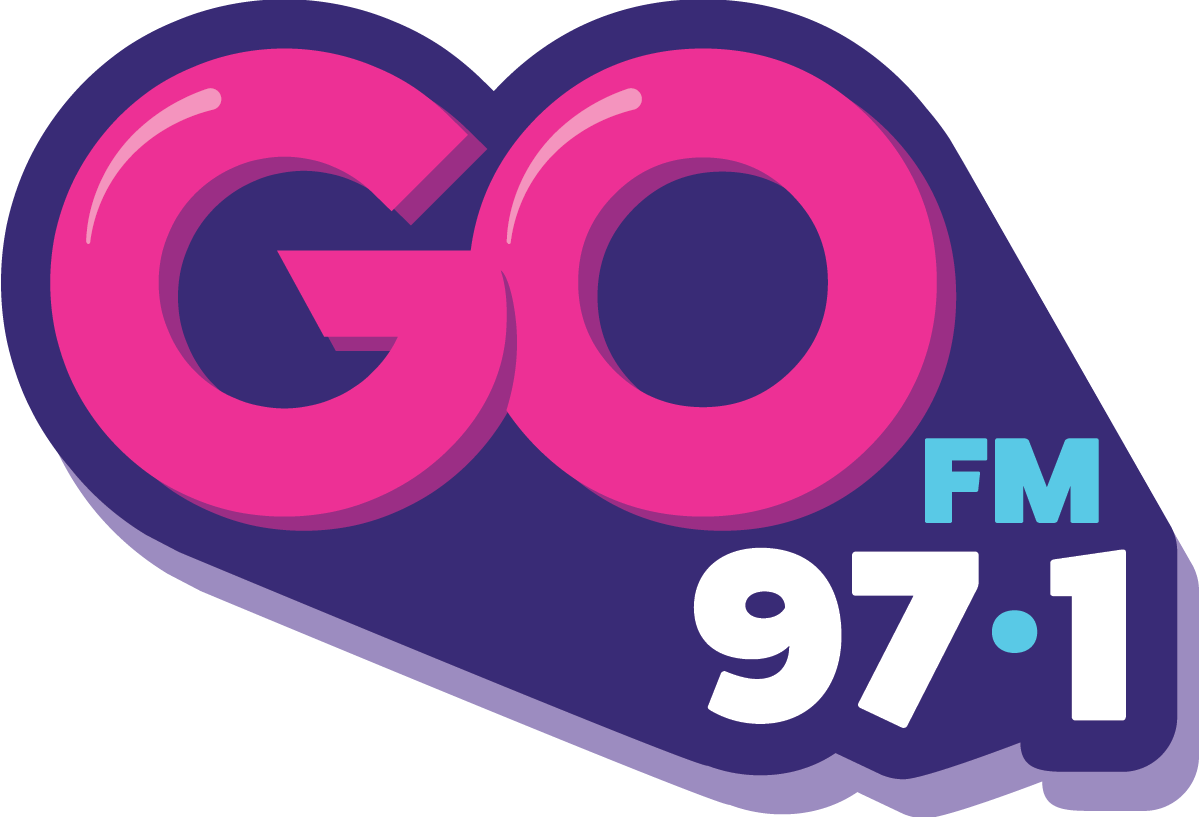
- Penticton, British Columbia; Canada
- Broadcast area: Okanagan-Similkameen
- Frequency: 97.1 MHz
- Branding: 97.1 GO FM

Programming
- Format: Adult contemporary

Ownership
- Owner: Vista Radio
- Sister stations: CKOR

History
- First air date: June 1, 1965
- Former call signs: CKOK-FM (1965–1977); CKOR-FM (1977–1986)

Technical information
- Class: B
- ERP: 1,800 watts horizontal polarization only
- HAAT: 230 metres (750 ft)
- Repeater: CJMG-FM-2 99.9 (Oliver)

Links
- Webcast: Listen Live

CJMG-FM (97.1 MHz) is a Canadian radio station located in Penticton, British Columbia. The station, owned by Vista Radio and operating with 1,800 watts of power, is branded as 97.1 GO FM and has an adult contemporary format.

Prior to December 27, 2020, CJMG was branded as 97.1 Sun FM with a CHR/Top 40 format.

On December 27, 2020, as part of a mass format reorganization by Bell Media, CJMG flipped to adult contemporary and rebranded as Move 97.1. While the station would run jockless for the first week of the format, on-air staff would return on January 4, 2021.

On February 8, 2024, Bell Media announced a restructuring that included the sale of 45 of its 103 radio stations to seven buyers, subject to approval by the CRTC, including CJMG, which was sold to Vista Radio. The application was approved on February 13, 2025.

The sale took effect April 14, 2025. Vista rebranded the station as 97.1 GO FM maintaining the adult contemporary format.

== Former logos ==
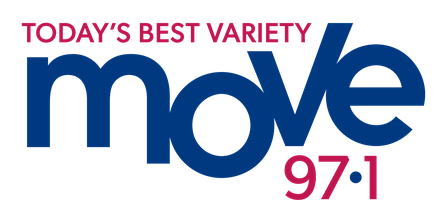
