= CIRX-FM-1 =

Radio station in Vanderhoof, British Columbia

- Vanderhoof, British Columbia; Canada
- Broadcast area: Nechako Valley
- Frequency: 95.9 MHz
- Branding: 95.9 The Goat

Programming
- Format: Active rock

Ownership
- Owner: Vista Radio; (Vista Radio Ltd.)

History
- First air date: November 1973

Technical information
- Class: B
- ERP: 1 watt horizontal polarization only
- HAAT: 500 metres (1,600 ft)

Links
- Website: mynechakovalleynow.com

CIRX-FM-1 (95.9 FM, 95.9 The Goat) is a Canadian radio station licensed to Vanderhoof, British Columbia. Owned by Vista Radio, it broadcasts an active rock format. The station formerly broadcast on AM as CIVH, but was forced to move permanently to FM in 2018 due to transmitter damage.

== History ==
Prince George Broadcasting Ltd. (owner of CJCI) received a licence for a new AM station at Vanderhoof in 1973. CIVH began broadcasting on 1340 kHz later that same year. A year later in 1974, CIVH was authorized to operate a rebroadcast transmitter at Fort St. James, on 1480 kHz with the call sign CIFJ. Also in 1974, CIFL was added to broadcast at 1450 kHz in Fraser Lake.

On October 19, 1993, the station had received CRTC approval to convert CIFJ operating at 1480 AM to 92.7 MHz on the FM dial, although the move did not take place.

The station previously operated retransmitters, CIFJ on 1480 in Fort St. James, and CIFL on 1450 in Fraser Lake, but they were discontinued in 2017 due to transmitter equipment issues

On March 6, 2018, the station's transmitter collapsed after one of its guy-wires were clipped by snow removal equipment contracted by the city of Vanderhoof. After the accident, CIVH moved its over-the-air feed to 95.9 CIRX-FM-1 (the local repeater of sister station CIRX-FM) as a temporary measure. However, in August 2018, Vista Radio announced that CIVH's programming would remain on 95.9 permanently, citing that it would too costly to repair and replace the transmitter's equipment. As requested by Vista Radio, CIVH's license was returned to the CRTC on August 15, 2018.

== See also ==
- CJCI-FM
