= CKKC-FM =

Radio station in Nelson, British Columbia

Coordinates: 49°31′50″N 117°18′02″W

- Nelson, British Columbia; Canada
- Broadcast area: Crawford Bay; New Denver; Kaslo; Nakusp
- Frequency: 106.9 MHz
- Branding: 106.9 Summit

Programming
- Format: Classic hits

Ownership
- Owner: Vista Radio
- Sister stations: CHNV-FM

History
- First air date: 1939
- Former call signs: CKLN (1939–1967)
- Former frequencies: 880 kHz (1939–1976); 1390 kHz (1976–1991); 1420 kHz (1991–2006)

Technical information
- Class: B
- ERP: 930 watts average; 2,000 watts peak; horizontal polarization only
- HAAT: 361 metres (1,184 ft)

Links
- Webcast: Listen Live
- Website: www.mynelsonnow.com

CKKC-FM is a Canadian radio station that broadcasts a classic hits format at 106.9 FM in Nelson, British Columbia. The station is owned by Vista Radio and is branded as 106.9 Summit. The station's programming is produced partly from its own studios, and from its sister station CJAT-FM in Trail. The station was launched in 1939 by the Nelson Daily News on AM as CKLN, it adopted its current call sign in 1967 and moved to the FM band in 2006.

== History ==
As CKLN, the station was a CBC Radio affiliate until the 1960s.

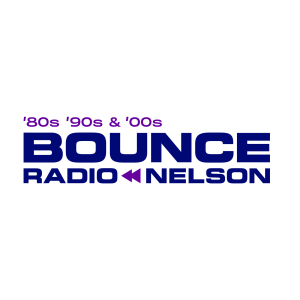
Logo as "Bounce Radio" 2021-2025

As part of a mass format reorganization by Bell Media, on May 18, 2021, CKKC dropped the adult contemporary format and the EZ Rock branding and flipped to adult hits, and adopted the Bounce branding.

On February 8, 2024, Bell announced a restructuring that included the sale of 45 of its 103 radio stations to seven buyers, subject to approval by the CRTC, including CKKC, which was to be sold to Vista Radio. The sale was approved in 2025.

The sale took effect April 14, 2025, and Vista rebranded the station as 106.9 Summit with a classic hits format.

== Rebroadcasters ==
- CKKC-1-FM 101.9 - Crawford Bay
- CKZX-FM 93.5 - New Denver
- CKZX-FM-1 95.3 - Kaslo
- CKBS-FM 103.1 - Nakusp
