= CJJR-FM =

Radio station in Vancouver, Canada

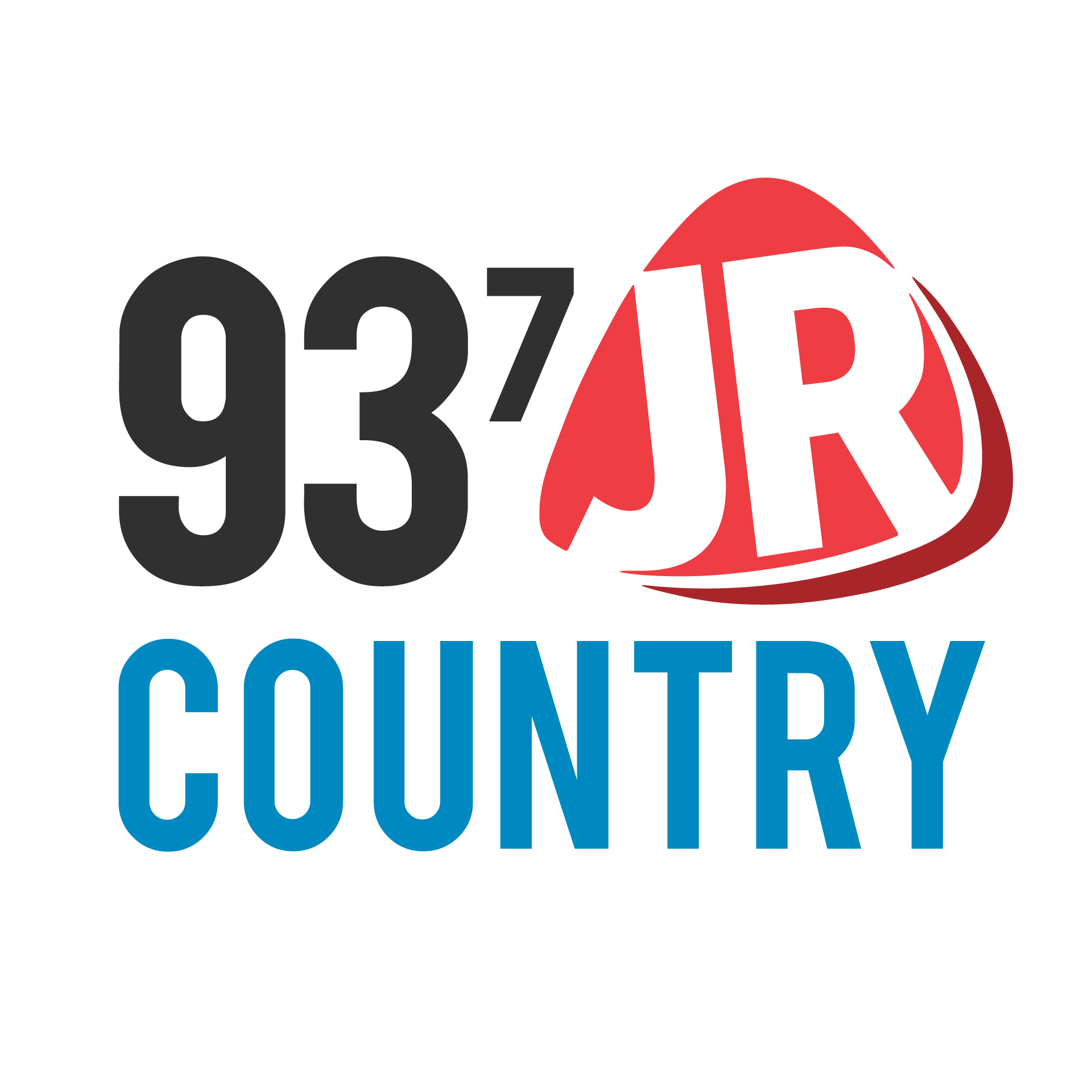
- Vancouver, British Columbia; Canada
- Broadcast area: Greater Vancouver
- Frequency: 93.7 MHz (HD Radio)
- Branding: 93.7 JR Country

Programming
- Format: Country

Ownership
- Owner: Jim Pattison Group; (Jim Pattison Broadcast Group Limited)
- Sister stations: CKPK-FM

History
- First air date: July 1, 1986; 39 years ago

Technical information
- Class: C
- ERP: 33,000 watts 61,000 watts maximum
- HAAT: 686 metres (2,251 ft)
- Transmitter coordinates: 49.357365°N 122.953776°W

Links
- Webcast: Listen Live
- Website: jrcountry.ca

CJJR-FM (93.7 MHz) is a commercial radio station in Vancouver, British Columbia. It is owned by the Jim Pattison Group with studios on West 8th Avenue in the Fairview neighbourhood of Vancouver. It broadcasts a country radio format branded as 93.7 JR Country.

CJJR-FM is a Class C station. It has an effective radiated power (ERP) of 33,000 watts (61,000 watts maximum). Its transmitter tower is on Mount Seymour in the District of North Vancouver.

== History ==
The station received approval by the Canadian Radio-television and Telecommunications Commission (CRTC) on March 20, 1986. It signed on the air on Canada Day (July 1) of that year.

CJJR-FM has had the same call sign and country music format since its founding. It was originally the FM sister station to CHRX (now CKPK-FM).
