= CHET-FM =

Radio station in Chetwynd, British Columbia

Coordinates: 55°40′07″N 121°34′57″W

- Chetwynd, British Columbia; Canada
- Frequency: 94.5 MHz
- Branding: Peace FM

Programming
- Format: community/campus radio

Ownership
- Owner: The Chetwynd Communications Society
- Sister stations: CHET-TV

History
- First air date: December 5, 1996
- Call sign meaning: Chetwynd (broadcast area)

Technical information
- Class: LP
- ERP: 27 watts horizontal polarization only
- HAAT: 265 metres (869 ft)
- Repeater: 104.1 CHAD-FM Dawson Creek

Links
- Website: peacefm.ca

CHET-FM is a Canadian radio station that broadcasts a community/campus format at 94.5 FM in Chetwynd, British Columbia. The station is owned by the Chetwynd Communications Society. CHET-FM and its television sister share studios on North Access Road in downtown Chetwynd.

CHET-FM began broadcasting on December 5, 1996, at 5:00 a.m.

In 2002 the station was given approval by the CRTC to add a 50-watt rebroadcast transmitter at 104.1 FM in Dawson Creek with the callsign CHAD-FM.
