= CKVG-FM =

Radio station in Vegreville, Alberta

Coordinates: 53.4984°N 112.0641°W

- Vegreville, Alberta; Canada
- Frequency: 106.5 MHz
- Branding: 106.5 The Ranch

Programming
- Format: Country

Ownership
- Owner: Vista Radio

History
- Call sign meaning: "Vegreville"

Technical information
- ERP: 13,000 watts
- HAAT: 107.8 metres (354 ft)

Links
- Website: myvegrevillenow.com

CKVG-FM (106.5 FM, "106.5 The Ranch") is a radio station in Vegreville, Alberta. Owned by Vista Radio, it broadcasts a country music format

== History ==
On February 20, 2014, CAB-K Broadcasting Ltd. received approval for a new radio station serving Vegreville, Alberta on 106.5 FM; the station would be Vegreville's first radio station, and carry a country music format with local news and information.

In September 2023, Vista Radio announced its intent to acquire CAB-K Broadcasting. In January 2025, the station switched to Vista's standard country music brand The Ranch.
