= CFSM-FM =

Radio station in Cranbrook, British Columbia

- Cranbrook, British Columbia; Canada
- Broadcast area: Kootenays
- Frequency: 107.5 MHz
- Branding: 107.5 2Day FM

Programming
- Format: Hot adult contemporary

Ownership
- Owner: Vista Radio

History
- First air date: September 11, 2015
- Call sign meaning: "Summit", format at launch

Technical information
- Class: C1
- ERP: 1.1 kW; (Horizontal polarization only)
- HAAT: 1,047.5 metres (3,437 ft)
- Transmitter coordinates: 49°27′29.88″N 115°37′48.00″W

Links
- Webcast: Listen Live
- Website: myeastkootenaynow.com

CFSM-FM (107.5 FM, 107.5 2Day FM) is a radio station in Cranbrook, British Columbia. Owned by Vista Radio, it broadcasts a hot adult contemporary format targeting the Kootenay region of British Columbia.

== History ==
The station was approved by the Canadian Radio-television and Telecommunications Commission on July 29, 2014. It launched on September 11, 2015 as adult contemporary Summit 107.

In December 2018, Vista Radio purchased Clear Sky Radio's remaining stations, including CFSM-FM. In August 2019, the station re-launched as 107.5 2Day FM, with a modern adult contemporary format featuring a mix of pop and rock hits.

== Rebroadcasters ==
Rebroadcasters of CFSM-FM
City of licence	Identifier	Frequency	Power	Class
Fernie	CFSM-FM-1	107.9 FM	(Horizontal polarization only); 154 watts	A
Invermere	CFSM-FM-3	107.7 FM	(Horizontal polarization only); 22 watts	A1
Sparwood	CFSM-FM-2	107.1 FM	(Horizontal polarization only); 69 watts	A
