= CFCP-FM =

Radio station in Courtenay, British Columbia

Coordinates: 49°44′54″N 125°14′58″W

- Courtenay, British Columbia; Canada
- Broadcast area: Vancouver Island
- Frequency: 98.9 MHz
- Branding: 98.9 Jet FM

Programming
- Format: Active rock

Ownership
- Owner: Vista Broadcast Group; (Vista Radio)

History
- First air date: September 1, 1959
- Former frequencies: 1440 kHz (1959–1999)

Technical information
- Licensing authority: CRTC
- Class: B
- ERP: horizontal polarization only: 2.682 kWs average 5 kWs peak
- HAAT: 437 metres (1,434 ft)

Links
- Website: mycomoxvalleynow.com

CFCP-FM is a Canadian radio station that broadcasts an active rock format at 98.9 FM in Courtenay, British Columbia, Canada. The station is branded as 98.9 Jet FM and is owned by Vista Broadcast Group.

The station began broadcasting on September 1, 1959, at 1440 AM. On November 11, 1999, the station moved to the FM dial as Magic 98.9 with an adult contemporary format. In October 2005, it changed formats to active rock with the branding 98.9 Jet FM. On May 30, 2014, CFCP changed its name to 98.9 The Goat. On November 1, 2019, "The Goat" changed all their logos on their Facebook and website and rebranded as 98.9 Jet FM once again, with former host Pete Montana and Robyn returning in the morning.

== Controversy ==
On December 19, 2012, Jet FM morning host Justin "Drex" Wilcomes hosted B.C. Premier Christy Clark on his program for an interview. One of the questions asked Clark during the interview, on behalf of a listener, was how she felt being a "MILF", a derogatory acronym. Clark laughingly responded to the question, saying that it was better to be a MILF than a "cougar". Clark then went on to thank the viewer, treating the question as a compliment. On January 10, 2013, the station fired Wilcomes and was released from his contract. The station did not give any further explanation, other than "We treat employee matters as private and will not comment further, other than to say that this was an internal decision." Wilcomes contended that he was fired for the interview, but refuses to comment further, pending legal advice.
