= CICF-FM =

Radio station in Vernon, British Columbia

- Vernon, British Columbia; Canada
- Frequency: 105.7 MHz
- Branding: 105.7 The Ranch

Programming
- Format: Country

Ownership
- Owner: Vista Radio

History
- First air date: October 23, 1978
- Former call signs: CKAL (1978–1987); CICF (1987–2001)
- Former frequencies: 1050 kHz (1978–2001)

Technical information
- Class: C1
- ERP: 47,000 average watts; 100,000 watts peak
- HAAT: 71.2 metres (234 ft)
- Transmitter coordinates: 50°13′27.12″N 119°18′10.80″W

Links
- Webcast: Listen Live
- Website: mynorthokanagannow.com/

CICF-FM (105.7 MHz) is a Canadian radio station in Vernon, British Columbia with a country format branded on-air as 105.7 The Ranch. The station is owned by Vista Radio.

The station began broadcasting on October 23, 1978 at 1050 kHz as CKAL. In 1981, CKAL added FM transmitters to rebroadcast the programming of CKAL in Nakusp, New Denver, and Kaslo, while another one was added to Armstrong/Enderby on 89.7 MHz in 1986. CKAL became CICF in 1987. The rebroadcasters CICF-FM-2 New Denver and CICF-FM-3 Kaslo were granted to change their programming source from CICF to CKKC in Nelson in 1990, and CICF-FM-1 Nakusp was shut down in 1997 and taken over by CKKC. The "CKAL" calls are now used by a television station in Calgary, Alberta.

On November 28, 2001, CICF moved to FM band at 105.7 MHz, and became hot adult contemporary station Sun FM. CICF was acquired by Astral Media in 2007 along with the former terrestrial broadcasting assets of Standard Radio. By 2010, CICF switched to CHR/Top 40. On November 19, 2020, the station flipped to country as Pure Country 105.7, becoming the latest Bell Media station to adopt the "Pure Country" branding. CIMX-FM in Windsor, Ontario and CJCJ-FM in Woodstock, New Brunswick would also switch to the "Pure Country" format and branding the same day.

On February 8, 2024, Bell Media announced a restructuring that included the sale of 45 of its 103 radio stations to seven buyers, subject to approval by the CRTC, including CICF, to be sold to Vista Radio. The sale was approved in 2025.

The sale took effect on April 14, 2025. Vista rebranded the station as 105.7 The Ranch maintaining the country format.
