= CKRX-FM =

Radio station in Fort Nelson, British Columbia

Coordinates: 58°48′49″N 122°42′52″W

- Fort Nelson, British Columbia; Canada
- Frequency: 102.3 MHz
- Branding: 102.3 Summit

Programming
- Format: Classic hits

Ownership
- Owner: Vista Radio

History
- First air date: November 21, 1967
- Former call signs: CFNL (1967–1997)
- Former frequencies: 590 kHz (1967–1997)

Technical information
- Class: A
- ERP: 1.8 kW
- HAAT: 122.5 metres (402 ft)

Links
- Website: https://www.myfortnelsonnow.com/

CKRX-FM is a Canadian radio station that broadcasts a classic hits format at 102.3 FM in Fort Nelson, British Columbia. The station is branded as 102.3 Summit and is owned by Vista Radio.

The station originally began broadcasting on November 21, 1967, as CFNL operating at 590 AM, until the move to the FM dial was made in 1997. It originally aired a hot adult contemporary format under the Energy 102.3 moniker until mid-2011, where it changed to an active rock format under a new moniker, 102.3 The Bear. It is the fourth radio station in Canada to use this moniker, after CFBR-FM in Edmonton, CKQB-FM in Ottawa (which changed owners on January 31, 2014, and format two months later), and CKNL-FM in Fort St. John.

As part of a mass format reorganization by Bell Media, on May 18, 2021, CKRX flipped to adult hits under the Bounce branding.

On February 8, 2024, Bell announced a restructuring that included the sale of 45 of its 103 radio stations to seven buyers, including CKRX, which were sold to Vista Radio. The CRTC approved the sale in 2025.

The sale took effect April 14, 2025. Vista changed the format to the station to Classic Hits and rebranded the station to 102.3 Summit.
