= CKVS-FM =

Radio station in British Columbia, Canada

Coordinates: 50°45′24″N 119°22′06″W

CKVS-FM is a community radio station broadcasting on the frequency of 93.7 MHz/FM in Salmon Arm, British Columbia, Canada.

== History ==
On August 21, 2012, Voice of the Shuswap Broadcast Society, the owner of the new 93.7 FM received Canadian Radio-television and Telecommunications Commission (CRTC) approval to operate a new low-power community FM radio station at Salmon Arm. The radio station began broadcasting December 10, 2012. According to the Canadian Communications Foundation website, CKVS-FM began on-air testing in February 2013.
