= CHNV-FM =

Radio station in Nelson, British Columbia

- Nelson, British Columbia; Canada
- Broadcast area: Kootenays
- Frequency: 103.5 MHz
- Branding: 103.5 The Bridge

Programming
- Format: Modern rock

Ownership
- Owner: Vista Broadcast Group; (Vista Radio)
- Sister stations: CKKC-FM, CKQR-FM

History
- First air date: June 11, 2010

Technical information
- Class: B
- ERP: 1.1 kW average 2.4 kW peak horizontal polarization only
- HAAT: 376 metres (1,234 ft)

Links
- Website: mynelsonnow.com

CHNV-FM is a modern rock radio station broadcasting at 103.5 FM in Nelson, British Columbia, Canada and is also heard at 91.9 FM in Crawford Bay with the call sign CHNV-FM-1. The station is branded as 103.5 The Bridge and is owned by the Vista Broadcast Group.

== History ==
The station originally began in 2005 as a rebroadcaster of CKQR-FM, formerly known as (BK Radio and Mountain FM) in Castlegar.

On August 19, 2008, Vista applied to change the authorized contours of its transmitter CHNV-FM in Nelson by increasing the average effective radiated power from 84 watts to 1,100 watts (maximum effective radiated power of 2,400 watts), by increasing the effective antenna height to 376 metres and by relocating the transmitter. This was approved on October 21, 2008.

At midnight on June 11, 2010 it split off from being a rebroadcaster and moved to its own programming. It was still branded as Mountain FM and continued to have a mainly active rock format, though with more emphasis on Indie music.

September 3, 2010 saw a format change to adult album alternative, and a rebranding to 103.5 The Bridge.

On May 30, 2014, CHNV flipped to variety hits as 103.5 Juice FM.

In February 2020, CHNV flipped to CHR/Top 40 format and as 103.5 The Bridge.

As of 2021, CHNV has an modern rock format.
