= CIGV-FM =

Coordinates: 49°42′44″N 119°36′32″W

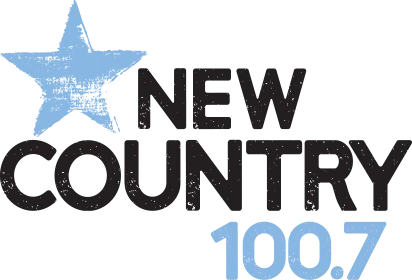
- Penticton, British Columbia; Canada
- Broadcast area: Okanagan Valley
- Frequency: 100.7 MHz
- Branding: New Country 100.7

Programming
- Format: Country

Ownership
- Owner: Stingray Group

History
- First air date: October 18, 1981
- Call sign meaning: Great Valley

Technical information
- Class: C
- ERP: horizontal polarization only: 6.3 kWs average 14.1 kWs peak
- HAAT: 793 metres (2,602 ft)

Links
- Webcast: Listen Live
- Website: newcountry1007.ca

CIGV-FM is a Canadian radio station, which broadcasts at 100.7 FM in Penticton, British Columbia, with rebroadcasters in Keremeos and Princeton. Founded by The Robinson Family of Great Valleys Radio in 1981, the station was sold to Newcap Radio in 2011, and approved by the CRTC on February 15, 2012. CIGV is the only country format station in the Okanagan Valley and was rebranded to Country 100.7 on April 27, 2012. On May 14, 2012, at 5:30 a.m., 'Okanagan Mornings with Troy Scott and Roo Phelps' went on the air. Troy Scott was released from the company in August 2012 and became Program Director of CJSU-FM. 100.7 re-branded the morning show as "Okanagan Mornings with Roo Phelps." Scott George hosts Okanagan Afternoons.

In February 2017, CIGV-FM rebranded to New Country 100.7.

CIGV's program director and morning host Casey Clarke—who formerly worked for CMT—produces several programs syndicated to other Stingray stations, including the Casey Clarke Country Countdown, and its current morning show The Casey Clarke Show.

== Rebroadcasters ==
- CIGV-FM-1 98.9 FM - Keremeos
- CIGV-FM-2 98.1 FM - Princeton

== Past station logos ==
New Country 100.7 Logo 2017–2024.
