= CFNI (AM) =

Radio station in Port Hardy

Coordinates: 50.7202°N 127.4919°W

- Port Hardy, British Columbia; Canada
- Frequency: 1240 kHz
- Branding: 1240 Coast AM

Programming
- Format: Classic hits

Ownership
- Owner: Vista Broadcast Group; (Vista Radio)

History
- First air date: 1979
- Call sign meaning: North Island

Technical information
- Class: C
- Power: 1,000 watts

Links
- Webcast: Listen Live
- Website: mytriportnow.com/coast-am

CFNI is a Canadian radio station that broadcasts a classic hits format at 1240 AM in Port Hardy, British Columbia. The station is owned by Vista Broadcast Group.

The station began broadcasting in 1979.

== Rebroadcasters ==
- CFPA-FM 100.3 Port Alice
