= Vista Radio =

Canadian radio broadcasting company

Vista Radio Ltd.
- Type: Private
- Industry: Radio broadcasting
- Founded: 2004; 22 years ago
- Founder: Bryan Edwards; Barb Fairclough; Jason Mann; Paul Mann; Margot Micallef
- Headquarters: Courtenay, British Columbia, Canada
- Owner: Westerkirk Capital
- Website: vistaradio.ca

Vista Radio Ltd. (also formerly known as Vista Broadcast Group) is a Courtenay, British Columbia-based media company. Owned by Westerkirk Capital, Vista is the second-largest owner of radio stations in Canada.

The company only owned stations in British Columbia until 2007, when it expanded outside the province by acquiring an existing station in Yellowknife, Northwest Territories and launching a new one in Grande Prairie, Alberta. With its acquisition of Haliburton Broadcasting Group, the company expanded into Ontario in 2012. In 2025, the company acquired 21 additional British Columbia stations from Bell Media.

== History ==
Vista Radio was founded by Paul Mann, Jason Mann, Margot Micallef, Barb Fairclough and Bryan Edwards in 2004.

On April 23, 2012, Vista announced that it had agreed to be acquired by Westerkirk Capital. With support from the new owner, Vista announced a concurrent agreement to acquire Haliburton Broadcasting Group, a broadcast group with 24 stations in small to mid-sized markets in Ontario. The deal was approved by the CRTC on October 19, 2012.

In July 2017, Vista announced its intent to sell CJUI-FM in Kelowna to Avenue Radio, Ltd., a company owned by former CILK-FM owner Nicholas J. Frost. In September 2023, Vista announced that it would acquire CAB-K Broadcasting, owner of two radio stations in Olds, Alberta and one in Vegreville.

On February 8, 2024, Bell Media announced that it would sell 21 of its radio stations in British Columbia to Vista Radio. The applications were approved by the CRTC on February 13, 2025. In April, Bell also reached an agreement to add Vista's current and future stations to iHeartRadio Canada. Vista relaunched all 21 stations under new brands on April 14, with most of the Move Radio stations rebranded as Go FM, Bounce Radio stations rebranded as Summit, and Pure Country mostly rebranded under Vista's existing country brand The Ranch.

In May 2025, Vista filed an application to acquire CJGY-FM in Grand Prairie, Alberta from Golden West Broadcasting.

== Stations ==
Many of Vista's stations operate under standardized brands, including:

- 2DayFM: Contemporary hit radio or hot adult contemporary
- The GOAT: Active or mainstream rock.
- Go FM: Hot adult contemporary. Replaced Bell Media's proprietary Move Radio brand on acquired stations in 2025.
- Juice FM: Adult or classic hits
- Moose FM/The Moose: Inherited from Haliburton Broadcasting Group,
- The Ranch: Country music.
- Country: Country music
- The Coast: Classic hits
- Jet FM: Classic hits
- The Summit: Adult hits. Replaced Bell Media's proprietary Bounce Radio brand on acquired stations in 2025.

=== Alberta ===
- Bonnyville - CFNA-FM
- Grande Prairie - CFRI-FM, CJGY-FM
- Lloydminster - CKLM-FM
- Lethbridge - CJOC-FM, CKBD-FM
- Olds - CKJX-FM, CKLJ-FM
- Vegreville - CKVG-FM

=== British Columbia ===
- 100 Mile House - CKBX
- Campbell River - CIQC-FM
- Castlegar - CKQR-FM
- Courtenay - CFCP-FM
- Cranbrook - CFSM-FM
- Creston - CKCV-FM
- Dawson Creek - CJDC
- Duncan - CJSU-FM
- Fort Nelson - CKRX-FM
- Fort St. John - CHRX-FM, CKNL-FM
- Golden - CKGR-FM
- Grand Forks - CKGF-2-FM
- Kelowna - CHSU-FM, CILK-FM, CKFR
- Kitimat - CKTK-FM
- Nanaimo - CKAY-FM
- Nelson - CHNV-FM, CKKC-FM
- Osoyoos - CJOR
- Port Hardy - CFNI
- Penticton - CJMG-FM, CKOR
- Powell River - CFPW-FM
- Prince George - CIRX-FM, CJCI-FM
- Prince Rupert - CHTK-FM
- Quesnel - CKCQ-FM
- Revelstoke - CKCR-FM
- Salmon Arm - CKXR-FM
- Smithers - CFBV
- Summerland - CHOR-FM
- Terrace - CFTK, CJFW-FM
- Trail - CJAT-FM
- Vanderhoof - CIRX-FM-1
- Vernon - CICF-FM
- Williams Lake - CFFM-FM

=== Northwest Territories ===
- Yellowknife - CJCD-FM

=== Ontario ===
Many of Vista's small-market radio stations in Ontario are branded as Moose FM, although the company uses a variety of other brands on its larger-market stations.

- Bancroft - CHMS-FM
- Barry's Bay - CHBY-FM
- Bracebridge - CFBG-FM
- Cochrane - CHPB-FM
- Elliot Lake - CKNR-FM
- Espanola - CJJM-FM
- Haliburton - CFZN-FM
- Huntsville - CFBK-FM
- Iroquois Falls - CFIF-FM
- Kapuskasing - CKAP-FM
- Kemptville - CKVV-FM
- North Bay - CFXN-FM, CFCH-FM
- Parry Sound - CKLP-FM
- Prescott - CKPP-FM
- Stratford - CJCS-FM, CHGK-FM
- Sturgeon Falls - CFSF-FM
- Timmins - CHMT-FM

=== Former stations ===
- Caledon, Ontario - CFGM-FM (defunct)
- Kelowna, British Columbia - CJUI (sold to Avenue Radio Ltd. in October 2017)
- Vanderhoof, British Columbia - CIVH (discontinued March 2018 after transmitter collapse. Programming moved to CIRX-FM-1.)
- Haldimand, Ontario - CKJN-FM (sold to Durham Radio in 2016)
- Niagara Falls, Ontario - CFLZ-FM, CJED-FM (sold to Byrnes Communications in January 2018)
- Medicine Hat, Alberta - CJLT-FM (sold to United Christian Broadcasters Canada in December 2023)
- Bolton, Ontario - CJFB-FM (sold to Local Radio Lab Inc. in April 2025)
