= CJOR (AM) =

Radio station in Osoyoos, British Columbia

- Osoyoos, British Columbia; Canada
- Broadcast area: Okanagan-Similkameen
- Frequency: 1240 kHz
- Branding: 1240 Summit

Programming
- Language: English
- Format: Classic hits

Ownership
- Owner: Vista Radio

Technical information
- Class: C
- Power: 1,000 watts
- Translator: CJOR-FM 102.9 Oliver

Links
- Webcast: Listen Live

CJOR (1240 AM, 1240 Summit) is a radio station in Osoyoos, British Columbia. Owned by Vista Radio, it broadcasts an adult hits format.

The station operates an FM rebroadcaster on 102.9 MHz as CJOR-FM in Oliver.

== History ==
CKOK Ltd. the original owner launched the station in December 1966 as CKOO. Sometime in the late 1970s or the early 1980s, a rebroadcaster was added in Oliver at 1490 AM with the callsign CKOO-1. In 1984, CKOO and CKOO-1 were authorized to increase night power from 250 to 1,000 watts. In 1991, CKOO and CKOO-1 adopted their current callsigns CJOR and CJOR-1. The CJOR callsign was previously used at an unrelated radio station in Vancouver from 1926 to 1988.

Over the years, the station went through a number of owners and formats. In 1993, CJOR received CRTC approval to convert CJOR-1 Oliver to the FM dial to operate at 102.9 MHz.

Logo as "Bounce Radio", 2021-2025

In May 2021 as part of a mass reorganization, CJOR flipped to adult hits as Bounce 1240.

The station has been sold to Vista Radio in 2024, as part of Bell Media's cuts, which was approved by the CRTC on February 13, 2025.

The sale took effect April 14, 2025, with Vista rebranding the station as "1240 Summit", and flipping to classic hits.
