= CFTK (AM) =

Radio station in Terrace, British Columbia

Coordinates: 54.5173°N 128.5889°W

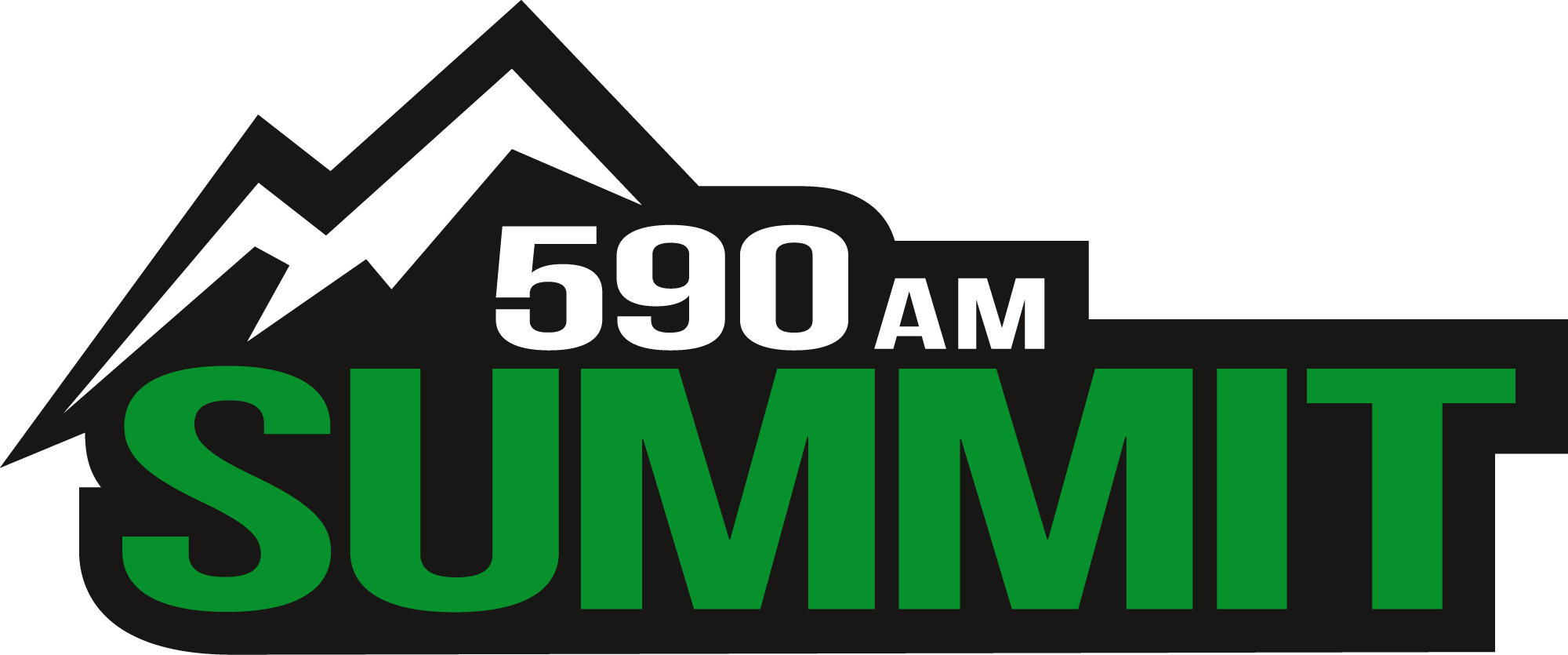
- Terrace, British Columbia; Canada
- Broadcast area: Terrace and Kitimat
- Frequency: 590 kHz
- Branding: 590 Summit

Programming
- Format: Classic hits

Ownership
- Owner: Vista Radio
- Sister stations: CJFW-FM

History
- First air date: 1960
- Call sign meaning: Coming From Terrace and Kitimat

Technical information
- Class: C
- Power: 1,000 watts

Links
- Webcast: Listen Live
- Website: www.myterracenow.com

CFTK is a Canadian radio station that broadcasts a classic hits format at 590 AM in Terrace, British Columbia. The station is branded as 590 Summit. The station is owned by Vista Radio. Prior to May 18, 2021, CFTK had an adult contemporary format branded as EZ Rock. Prior to April 14, 2025, it had an adult hits format branded as Bounce.

== History ==
The station began broadcasting in 1960 at 1140 AM, and later moved to its current frequency in 1963.

As part of a mass format reorganization by Bell Media, on May 18, 2021, CFTK flipped to adult hits under the Bounce branding.

On February 8, 2024, Bell announced a restructuring that included the sale of 45 of its 103 radio stations to seven buyers, subject to approval by the CRTC, including CFTK, to be sold to Vista Radio. The application was approved on February 13, 2025.

The sale took effect April 14, 2025, and Vista rebranded the station to classic hits as 590 Summit.
