= CIFM-FM =

Radio station in Kamloops

- Kamloops, British Columbia; Canada
- Frequency: 98.3 MHz
- Branding: 98.3 CIFM

Programming
- Format: Active rock

Ownership
- Owner: Jim Pattison Group

History
- First air date: 1962
- Former call signs: CFFM-FM (1962–1987)

Technical information
- Licensing authority: CRTC
- Class: B
- ERP: 4.3 kW
- HAAT: 119.5 metres (392 ft)
- Transmitter coordinates: 50°40′14.88″N 120°23′56.40″W

Links
- Webcast: www.98.3cifm.com/player/?%0AplayerID=835
- Website: 983cifm.com

CIFM-FM (98.3 MHz) is a radio station in Kamloops, British Columbia, Canada. Owned by Jim Pattison Group, the station currently broadcasts an active rock format.

== History ==
The station was launched in 1962 as CFFM-FM by Inland Broadcasters, and was acquired by the Jim Pattison Group in 1987.

== Rebroadcasters ==
The station also has the following rebroadcast transmitters:

Rebroadcasters of CIFM-FM
City of licence	Identifier	Frequency	Power	Class	RECNet	CRTC Decision
Savona	CIFM-FM-1	101.9 FM	? watts	?	Query	
Clearwater	CIFM-FM-2	92.7 FM	163 watts	B	Query	
Merritt	CIFM-FM-3	103.9 FM	40 watts	B	Query	
Clinton	CIFM-FM-4	101.3 FM	160 watts	B	Query	
Barriere	CIFM-FM-5	105.9 FM	160 watts	A	Query	
Cache Creek	CIFM-FM-6	95.3 FM	125 watts	A	Query	
Pritchard	CIFM-FM-7	106.3 FM	19 watts	A1	Query	
Chase	CIFM-FM-8	93.1 FM	140 watts	A	Query	
Sun Peaks	CIFM-FM-9	90.1 FM	40 watts	LP	Query	2003-494
Shalalth	CHBR-FM	95.1 FM	1 watt	LP	Query	94-803
Lytton	CIAK-FM	102.3 FM	5 watts	B	Query	
Lillooet	VF2369	96.9 FM	10 watts	LP	Query	
