= CKQR-FM =

Radio station in Castlegar, British Columbia

Coordinates: 49°18′54″N 117°37′31″W

- Castlegar, British Columbia; Canada
- Broadcast area: Kootenays
- Frequency: 99.3 MHz
- Branding: The Goat

Programming
- Format: Classic rock

Ownership
- Owner: Vista Broadcast Group; (Vista Radio)
- Sister stations: CHNV-FM

History
- First air date: September 22, 1969
- Former frequencies: 1340 kHz (1969–1970s); 1230 kHz (1970s–1984); 760 kHz (1984–1980s)
- Call sign meaning: Central Kootenay Quality Radio

Technical information
- Class: A
- ERP: 333 watts average 656 watts peak horizontal polarization only
- HAAT: −366.5 metres (−1,202 ft)

Links
- Webcast: Listen Live

CKQR-FM is a Canadian radio station that broadcasts a classic rock format at 99.3 FM in Castlegar, British Columbia. The station is branded as The Goat and it is owned by the Vista Broadcast Group.

== History ==
The station originally signed on September 22, 1969 and began broadcasting at 1230 AM in the 1970s, then moved to 760 AM in 1984 until it moved to its current frequency in 1998.

CKGF began broadcasting on 1340 kHz in 1969 and moved to FM in the 1980s.

In 1993, CKQR began simulcasting some of its programming on CKGF Grand Forks. On December 16, later that same year, CKQR was given approval to add an FM transmitter at Nelson, operating on 103.5 MHz, with an effective radiated power of 84 watts. The rebroadcaster in Nelson signed on the following year.

On February 3, 2005, the CRTC approved the application by Valley Broadcasters Ltd. for a broadcasting licence to operate an English-language FM commercial radio programming undertaking in Nelson. The new station would operate at 103.5 MHz (channel 278A1) with an average effective radiated power of 104 watts, and would have a transmitter in Crawford Bay operating at 91.9 MHz (channel 220LP) with an ERP of 40 watts. The new station in Nelson would replace CHNV-FM, a transmitter of CKQR, also owned by Valley.

At midnight on June 11, 2010, CHNV in Nelson ceased being a rebroadcaster of CKQR and moved to its own programming. It was still branded as Mountain FM and continues to have its current active rock format.

On June 19, 2014, Mountain FM was rebranded as The GOAT.

At 1:00 pm on March 10, 2016, CKGF Grand Forks ceased being a rebroadcaster of CKQR- and moved to its own programming. It was branded as Juice FM and operates under a variety hits format. 93.3 FM in Christina Lake, 96.7 FM in Greenwood, and 103.7 FM in Rock Creek also flipped to rebroadcast CKGF.

== Rebroadcasters ==
Rebroadcasters of CKQR-FM
City of licence	Identifier	Frequency	RECNet	CRTC Decision
Trail	CHRT-FM	104.1 FM	Query	

== See also ==
- CKGF-FM
