= CJAT-FM =

Radio station in Trail, British Columbia

Coordinates: 49°05′33″N 117°49′16″W

- Trail, British Columbia; Canada
- Broadcast area: Trail; Castlegar; Grand Forks; Creston
- Frequency: 95.7 MHz
- Branding: Summit 95.7

Programming
- Format: Classic hits

Ownership
- Owner: Vista Radio

History
- First air date: 1933

Technical information
- Class: C
- ERP: 13,500 watts; 220 watts (CJAT-FM-1); 450 watts (CJAT-FM-2)
- HAAT: 462.5 metres (1,517 ft); −491.1 metres (−1,611 ft) (CJAT-FM-1); −366.6 metres (−1,203 ft) (CJAT-FM-2)
- Repeaters: 90.3 CJAT-FM-1 Castlegar; 103.3 CJAT-FM-2 Grand Forks; 1340 CFKC Creston

CJAT-FM (Summit 95.7) is a Canadian radio station that broadcasts an adult hits format at 95.7 FM in Trail, British Columbia and is also heard in Castlegar at 90.3 FM and Grand Forks at 103.3 FM, including other rebroadcasters.

== History ==
The station began broadcasting in 1933 and has changed many frequencies until its last AM frequency at 610 kHz in 1941. CFKC operates at 1340 kHz in Creston, which was launched in 1968. As of 1989, CFKC Creston became a full-time rebroadcaster of CJAT Trail. The station was originally an affiliate of the Canadian Radio Broadcasting Commission and then affiliated with the Canadian Broadcasting Corporation when it was formed in 1936. The station would remain affiliated with CBC, including its Trans-Canada Network from 1944 to 1962 and then its successor CBC Radio until 1977.

In 1994, the station received CRTC approval to convert CJAT Trail from the AM band to the FM band at 95.7 MHz. On June 30, 2006, CJAT received approval to add new FM transmitters at Castlegar which would operate at 90.3 MHz and Grand Forks at 103.3 MHz.

Over the years, CJAT went through various formats and ownerships and was owned by Bell Media until 2025, which rebranded the station with the EZ Rock format on October 5, 2011, and then with the Bounce format on May 18, 2021.

On February 8, 2024, Bell announced a restructuring that included the sale of 45 of its 103 radio stations to seven buyers, subject to approval by the CRTC, including CJAT, which is to be sold to Vista Radio.The application was approved on February 13, 2025.

The sale took effect April 14, 2025 and Vista rebranded the station to Classic Hits as 95.7 Summit.
