= CJSU-FM =

Radio station in Duncan, British Columbia

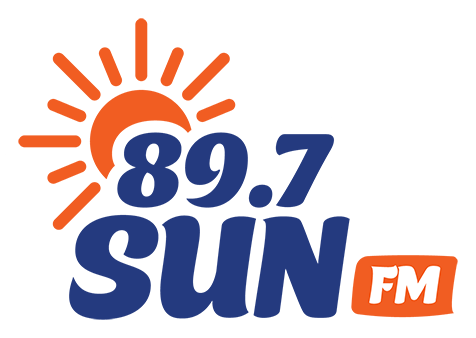
- Duncan, British Columbia; Canada
- Broadcast area: Vancouver Island
- Frequency: 89.7 MHz
- Branding: 89.7 Sun FM

Programming
- Format: Adult hits
- Affiliations: Cowichan Valley Capitals

Ownership
- Owner: Vista Broadcast Group; (Vista Radio)

History
- First air date: 1964
- Former call signs: CKAY (1964–2000)
- Former frequencies: 1500 kHz (1964–2000)
- Call sign meaning: From "Sun" branding

Technical information
- Class: B
- ERP: horizontal polarization only: 1,862 watts average 3,470 watts peak
- HAAT: 506 metres (1,660 ft)
- Transmitter coordinates: 48°51′37.08″N 123°45′25.20″W

Links
- Webcast: Listen Live
- Website: mycowichanvalleynow.com/on-air

CJSU-FM is a Canadian radio station that broadcasts at 89.7 FM in Duncan, British Columbia. The station is owned by Vista Broadcast Group and broadcasts an adult hits format branded as 89.7 Sun FM.

The station originally began broadcasting in 1964 as CKAY at 1500 AM, until the switch to the FM dial was made on August 1, 2000, and the station recalled.

== Former Logo ==
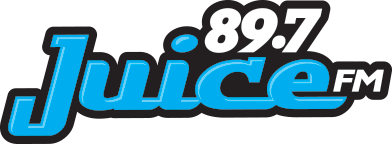
