= CBYK-FM =

Radio station in Kamloops

- Kamloops, British Columbia; Canada
- Broadcast area: Thompson and Cariboo regions
- Frequency: 94.1 MHz

Programming
- Format: News/Talk
- Network: CBC Radio One

Ownership
- Owner: Canadian Broadcasting Corporation

History
- First air date: 1977, as a CBU repeater; October 9, 2012, as a separate station
- Call sign meaning: CBC Kamloops

Technical information
- Class: B
- ERP: 4.75 kW
- HAAT: 124 metres (407 ft)
- Transmitter coordinates: 50°40′15″N 120°23′56″W

Links
- Webcast: CBC Kamloops webcast
- Website: CBC Kamloops

CBYK-FM is a radio station, broadcasting the programming of the CBC Radio One network in Kamloops, British Columbia, Canada. The station airs at 94.1 FM in Kamloops.

== History ==
The station was established in 1977 as a local rebroadcaster of Vancouver's CBU, replacing private CBC affiliate CFJC (now CKBZ-FM). CBYK switched to CBTK-FM Kelowna after regional programming for the Southern BC Interior commenced from that station in 1987.

On October 28, 2011, the CBC filed an application with the Canadian Radio-television and Telecommunications Commission (CRTC) to convert CBYK-FM from a rebroadcaster of CBTK-FM to an anchor of a new 23-station regional CBC Radio One network for the Thompson and Cariboo regions, with regional programming originating from new studios in Kamloops. Under CBC's proposal, the stations under CBYK-FM would have its own morning rush hour program originating out of Kamloops instead of rebroadcasting the programming out of Kelowna, and there would be several news updates throughout the day originating from Kamloops on weekdays. All other programming would be the same as those broadcast in Kelowna. After the application was heard on January 16, 2012, at a CRTC meeting in Miramichi, New Brunswick, the CRTC approved the new regional network on March 30, 2012. Repeater CBUC-FM in Salmon Arm, which was to have been part of the new network, will remain a repeater of CBTK-FM, following interventions from various parties, including the City of Salmon Arm, as the region is more economically tied with the Okanagan region than with Kamloops.

On September 6, 2012, it was announced that the CBC would launch the new regional network sometime in the fall of that year, with specifics to be announced during the current regional morning program, Daybreak Kelowna, on September 10, 2012; it was announced that day that the new regional morning program for Thompson and Cariboo, Daybreak Kamloops, would begin October 9, 2012, officially launching the new regional network on that day. CBYK's studios and news bureau is based at the Bank of Montreal building on 218 Victoria Street in Kamloops.

Shortly after CBYK-FM's launch as a separate station, residents of Revelstoke complained to the CRTC that they were not consulted by the CBC when they switched their local repeater, CBTO-FM, to CBYK-FM's programming; e-mails made to the city's mayor's office show that 80% of listeners prefer programming from Kelowna, while only 20% prefer the new Kamloops programming. The CRTC later said that it is up to the CBC to decide which programming originates for CBTO-FM, not the CRTC. After city officials contacted the CBC, BC spokesperson Lorna Haeber said that the CBC would make a decision on the issue "shortly", but failed to elaborate how or when the decision would be made. The CRTC subsequently issued a notice that it had approved an application by the CBC to change the local programming source of its Radio One transmitter in Revelstoke from Kamloops back to Kelowna. The change was implemented on January 2, 2014.

== Local programming ==
CBYK-FM produces its own local morning show, Daybreak Kamloops, which began October 9, 2012, hosted by veteran broadcaster Shelley Joyce. The station continues to carry CBTK-FM's local afternoon show, Radio West with Sarah Penton, which airs across the whole interior of British Columbia. Newsbreaks during the day originate from the new Kamloops studios; staffers include former CFJC-TV staffers Rob Polson (anchor) and Doug Herbert (reporter), and Josh Pagé of CBC's Regina operations.

== Rebroadcasters ==
Rebroadcasters of CBYK-FM
City of licence	Identifier	Frequency	Power	Class	RECNet	CRTC Decision	Notes
Falkland	CBTF-FM	102.7 FM	217 watts	B	Query	84-546	50°27′51″N 119°34′52″W
Gold Bridge	CBTG	860 AM	40 watts	LP	Query		50°50′21″N 122°51′47″W
Lytton	CBTY-FM	93.1 FM	183 watts	A1	Query	84-547	50°13′29″N 121°34′49″W
Blue River	CBKM	860 AM	40 watts	LP	Query	85-43	52°6′20″N 119°18′30″W
Shalalth	CBKN	990 AM	40 watts	LP	Query	85-71	50°43′49″N 122°14′30″W
Cache Creek	CBYK-FM-2	93.5 FM	1,127 watts	A1	Query	2018-147	50°48′42″N 121°19′40″W
Clearwater	CBKZ	860 AM	40 watts	LP	Query		51°38′38″N 120°2′12″W
Williams Lake	CBYK-FM-1	92.1 FM	275 watts	A	Query	2013-672	52°8′31″N 122°9′28″W
North Bend	CBRN-FM	90.7 FM	96 watts	A1	Query		49°52′59″N 121°27′13″W
Bralorne	CBRZ	1350 AM	40 watts	LP	Query		50°46′35″N 122°49′4″W
Chase	CBUH-FM	95.5 FM	225 watts	A	Query	99-434	50°54′8″N 119°38′25″W
Lillooet	CBUL-FM	92.7 FM	90 watts	A1	Query	2011-670	50°41′23″N 121°56′11″W
Merritt	CBUP	860 AM	40 watts	LP	Query		50°6′31″N 120°47′19″W
100 Mile House	CBUS-FM	91.3 FM	1,800 watts	B	Query		51°54′10″N 121°15′11″W
Clinton	CBUU-FM	98.9 FM	50 watts	LP	Query	2017-216	51°5′40″N 121°35′5″W
Mica Dam	CBXA	1150 AM	40 watts	LP	Query		52°3′40″N 118°34′29″W
Logan Lake	CBYE-FM	92.9 FM	135 watts	A1	Query		50°30′4″N 120°48′51″W
Barriere	CBYO-FM	104.1 FM	415 watts	B	Query		51°16′21″N 120°7′13″W
Alexis Creek	CBYU-FM	93.7 FM	2,600 watts	B	Query		51°50′2″N 123°3′12″W
Vavenby	CBYZ-FM	91.9 FM	80 watts	A1	Query		51°34′37″N 119°47′35″W

=== FM conversions ===
- In July 2011, CBTK-FM applied to convert CBUL Lillooet from 860 kHz to 92.7 MHz; the application received CRTC approval on October 26, 2011.
- On July 12, 2013, the CBC submitted an application to convert CBRL Williams Lake from 860 kHz to 92.1 MHz and adopted a new callsign CBYK-FM-1. This application was approved on December 11, 2013.
- On March 20, 2017, the CBC applied to convert CBUU 1070 kHz Clinton to 98.9 MHz with a new callsign CBUU-FM. This application was approved on June 23, 2017.
- On May 4, 2018, the CRTC approved the CBC's application to convert CBKS 1450 to 93.5 MHz with a new callsign CBYK-FM-2. The CBC has also applied to shut down CBWA 860 Ashcroft when the new FM in Cache Creek is launched as the FM signal will adequately cover both communities.
- On August 23, 2022, the CBC submitted an application to convert CBUP 860 Merritt from the AM band to the FM band at 98.7 MHz.
