= Channel 5 =

Channel 5 most commonly refers to:

- 5 (British TV channel), British commercial public broadcast network
  - Channel 5 Broadcasting Limited, parent company of the British TV channel

Channel 5 may also refer to:

== North America ==
=== Latin America ===
- Canal 5 (Mexican TV channel), a Mexican television network owned by Televisa
  - XHGC-TDT, a television station in Mexico City, flagship of the Canal 5 network
- Canal 5 TV-CE, a defunct Guatemalan television channel
- Great Belize Television, Belize television station, known as "Channel 5", founded in 1991 and broadcasting from Belize City
- Panavisión, a defunct Panamanian television channel
- Tonis (Canada), a former Ukrainian-language digital cable specialty television channel

=== Canada and United States ===
- KTLA Channel 5, a CW-affiliated television station in Los Angeles, California, United States
- KPIX-TV Channel 5, a CBS-owned television station in San Francisco, California, United States
- WNYW Channel 5, a Fox-affiliated television station in New York City, United States
- Channel 5 (web series), an American web channel led by Andrew Callaghan
- Channel 5 branded TV stations in the United States
- Channel 5 virtual TV stations in Canada
- Channel 5 virtual TV stations in the United States
- Channel 5 TV stations in Canada
- Channel 5 digital TV stations in the United States
- Channel 5 low-power TV stations in the United States

== South America ==
- Canal 5 Noticias, an Argentine television news channel
- Canal 5 (Uruguay), a government-owned Uruguayan television network
- Paravisión, a Paraguayan television network broadcasting on Channel 5 in Asunción
- TV+ (Chile), formerly UCV Televisión, a chilean free-to-air television channel broadcasting on Channel 5 in Santiago de Chile
- Telefe Rosario, Argentine television station which broadcasts from the city of Rosario
- Telesol, a television station in San Juan, Argentina
- Panamericana Televisión a Peruvian free-to-air television channel Broadcasting on Channel 5 in Lima, Peru

== Asia and Oceania ==
- CCTV-5, a Chinese television channel
- TV5 (Philippine TV network), a Filipino commercial television network formerly known as "ABC 5" and "5"
  - DWET-TV, the flagship television station of TV5 in Metro Manila, Philippines
- Enjoy TV5, a Malaysian television channel
- Mediacorp 5, a Singaporean English-language television channel
- RTA5, Thailand television broadcaster, founded in 1958 and owned by the Royal Thai Army
- IRIB TV5, operated by Islamic Republic of Iran Broadcasting
- Channel 5 (Pakistani TV channel), Pakistani Entertainment and News Channel
- Sport 5, Israeli cable and satellite TV station
- TV Asahi, a television station in Tokyo, Japan using virtual channel 5
- Sky 5, the former name of New Zealand television channel Sky Justice
- VTV5, a Vietnamese television channel

== Europe ==
- Channel 5 Video, a joint venture between PolyGram Filmed Entertainment and Heron Communications in the late 1980s and early 1990s
- 5 Kanal, Ukrainian television channel
- Canale 5, Italian television broadcaster
- Channel 5 Lithuania, the largest regional TV channel in Lithuania
- France 5, French public television network
- Kanal 5 (Swedish TV channel), Swedish commercial channel
- Kanal 5 (Danish TV channel), Danish television channel
- 5TV (Russian TV channel), Russian broadcaster, seen nationally, with regional channels
- Telecinco, Spain's second private television station
- RTL 5, a Dutch television channel
- Play5, a Belgian television channel
- La Cinq, a defunct French television channel
- Yle Teema & Fem, a Finnish television channel
- NTV-5, a defunct Latvian television channel
- Belarus-5, a Belarusian television channel

== Africa ==
- Alexandria Channel, an Egyptian regional television channel

== Other uses ==
- Channel 5 (Fear the Walking Dead), a 2019 episode of the television series
- Canal 5 Creative Campus, a tourist attraction in Changzhou, China

== See also ==
- Chanel No. 5, French perfume produced by the Parisian fashion house of Chanel
- CH5 (disambiguation)
- C5 (disambiguation)
- Kanal 5 (disambiguation)
- TV5 (disambiguation)
- FM extended band in Brazil, current allocation of VHF channels 5 and 6 in Brazil
