= Media in Prince George, British Columbia =

This is a list of media outlets in Prince George, British Columbia, Canada.

== Radio ==
Frequency	Call sign	Branding	Format	Owner	Notes
88.7 FM	CFUR-FM		campus radio	University of Northern British Columbia	
90.3 FM	CBU-FM-5	CBC Music	public music	Canadian Broadcasting Corporation	Rebroadcasts CBU-FM Vancouver
91.5 FM	CBYG-FM	CBC Radio One	public news/talk	Canadian Broadcasting Corporation	
93.1 FM	CFIS-FM		community radio	Prince George Community Radio Society	
94.3 FM	CIRX-FM	The Goat	active rock	Vista Broadcast Group	
95.5 FM	CBUF-FM-4	Ici Radio-Canada Première	public news/talk	Canadian Broadcasting Corporation	French; rebroadcasts CBUF-FM Vancouver
97.3 FM	CJCI-FM	Country 97 FM	country music	Vista Broadcast Group	
99.3 FM	CKDV-FM	99.3 Rewind Radio	classic hits	Jim Pattison Group	
101.3 FM	CKKN-FM	The River	hot adult contemporary	Jim Pattison Group	

== Television ==
The city is served by CKPG-TV, a conventional broadcast station which originates programming locally. All of the city's other television signals are rebroadcasters of stations from Vancouver, British Columbia.

As in most Canadian cities, digital television transmission has not commenced in Prince George as of early 2014. However, all of the city's television signals have their DTV channel assignments already in place.

OTA channel	DTV channel	Call sign	Network	Notes
2		CKPG-TV	City (affiliate)	
29	12-1	CIFG-DT	Global	Digital rebroadcaster of CHAN-DT Vancouver

Rogers Communications operates a community channel, Rogers TV, in Prince George. Rogers also carries Vancouver CBC Television station CBUT-DT to all subscribers, following CKPG-TV's disaffiliation from the CBC network, which left the community with no local CBC Television transmitter, as well as Radio-Canada station CBUFT-DT, whose repeater closed down on July 31, 2012. The Prince George area does not receive CBC Television, Ici Radio-Canada Télé, or CTV over the air.

== Publications ==
Prince George has one main newspaper, a weekly published on Thursday, the Prince George Citizen, winner of the 2006 Michener Award, which appears Tuesday through Saturday. The Prince George Free Press which appeared on Wednesday and Friday, ceased publication on May 1, 2015. Over the Edge publishes student-based content out of the University of Northern British Columbia every other week from September to March, and offers online content throughout the rest of the year. There is also a café newsletter, PG Xpress (weekly). Prince George also has two advertising publications, the Prince George Buy & Sell and the Prince George Bargain Finder.
