= TV5 =

TV 5 may refer to the following television channels, networks and stations:

- TV5 (Acre), a commercial television station in Brazil
- TV5 Cambodia
- TV5 (Finnish TV channel), a Finnish television channel owned by SBS Discovery Media
- TV5 (India), Telugu-language news channel
- TV5 (Latvia), former television channel in Latvia
- TV5 Mongolia, Mongolia based nationwide broadcasting network
- TV5 Network, Filipino media company based in Mandaluyong.
  - TV5 (Philippine TV network), television network in the Philippines
- Enjoy TV5, Malaysian television channel
- TV5Monde, French-language global television channel commonly referred to as "TV5" or "Telecinq"
- TV5 Québec Canada, Canada-based French-language television channel, which partners with TV5Monde
  - TV5 Unis
- TV Pětka, Czech television channel
- TV5, A former name of TV Okey, a Malaysian Channel owned by RTM.

== See also ==
- Channel 5 (disambiguation)
