= CKPG =

CKPG may refer to:

- CKPG-TV, a television station (channel 2) licensed to Prince George, British Columbia, Canada
- CKDV-FM, a radio station (99.3 FM) licensed to Prince George, British Columbia, Canada, which held the call sign CKPG from February 1946 to May 2003
