= Northern Television =

Defunct two-station network in northern British Columbia, Canada

- Type: Television system
- Branding: NTV
- Country: Canada
- Availability: British Columbia (northern)
- Dissolved: Yes

Northern Television was the name of a regional television system in northern British Columbia, composed of two private CBC Television stations, CFTK-TV and CJDC-TV.

== History ==
It was also known as "NTV", but should not be confused with CJON-DT, an unrelated station in Newfoundland and Labrador that also identifies itself as "NTV".

The network was disbanded and succeeded by a newer system, Great West Television (joined by CKPG-TV).
