= CJDC =

CJDC may refer to:

- CJDC (AM), a radio station (890 AM) licensed to Dawson Creek, British Columbia, Canada
- CJDC-TV, a television station (channel 5) licensed to Dawson Creek, British Columbia, Canada
- The Central Jakarta District Court
