= Newsworld International =

American news television network

- Country: United States
- Broadcast area: United States and the Caribbean
- Headquarters: New York City, New York; Toronto, Ontario

Programming
- Language: English
- Picture format: 480i (SDTV)

Ownership
- Owner: Canadian Broadcasting Corporation/Power Corporation of Canada (1994–2000); USA Networks/Vivendi Universal (2000–2004); Al Gore and Joel Hyatt (2004–2005)
- Sister channels: CBC Newsworld; Trio

History
- Launched: June 1, 1994; 32 years ago
- Closed: July 31, 2005; 21 years ago
- Replaced by: Current TV

Newsworld International (NWI) was an American news-oriented cable and satellite television network that operated from June 1994 to July 2005. The network carried a mix of newscasts from the Canadian Broadcasting Corporation and other international networks. After several ownership changes, the channel was purchased by former U.S. Vice President Al Gore and other parties in 2005 and became Current TV.

== History ==
The network was launched on June 1, 1994, as a joint venture between the Canadian Broadcasting Corporation (CBC) and Power Corporation of Canada along with sister channel Trio. It aired much of the same programming as the CBC-owned Canadian cable news channel CBC Newsworld.

During the late 1990s, Newsworld International's Sunday evening newscast at 7:00 p.m. Eastern Time aired on CBC-owned CBET in Windsor, Ontario as a replacement for the ABC family film anthology series The Wonderful World of Disney, which aired on most other CBC stations in that timeslot (Windsor is part of the Detroit market for programming purposes, as such, stations in Southwestern Ontario near the U.S.–Canada border pre-empt certain U.S.-based programs whose rights are held by Canadian networks to avoid paying higher advertising rates).

The channel reached about 20 million homes and provided news coverage from a variety of global perspectives. It also acted as a news source for Canadians who reside or were visiting the United States, Latin America or the Caribbean. The channel was available across the United States mainly on satellite provider DirecTV.

In May 2000, Newsworld International was sold along with sister cable channel Trio to Barry Diller's USA Network for $155 million. It was subsequently acquired by Vivendi (which later merged with Universal Pictures to become Vivendi Universal). The CBC maintained day-to-day operation of the channel. The network's main in-house news program was NWI International NewsFirst.

=== Shutdown and replacements ===
In 2004, during Viendi's merger of its entertainment division with the National Broadcasting Company to form NBC Universal, Newsworld International was purchased by former U.S. Vice President Al Gore and Joel Hyatt, who acquired it mainly for the channel's digital cable and satellite coverage reach, and were not interested in maintaining the network's existing format. Programming on Newsworld continued to be provided by the CBC until July 31, 2005; on that date, the network ceased operations with a special farewell message from the channel's Toronto offices on behalf of the Canadian Broadcasting Corporation at the Canadian Broadcasting Centre.

Gore and Hyatt relaunched the channel at midnight on August 1 as Current TV, specializing in a youth perspective on national issues. Gore and Hyatt chose the format after deciding that a liberal-focused news network would be rejected by national advertisers. The new channel, despite being profitable, underwent a major reorganization in 2010 after a "troubled" history, eventually evolving it into a progressive-leaning news and documentary channel. Gore and his partners sold the network to Al Jazeera Media Network in 2013, which like Gore and Hyatt before them, was mainly interested in taking over the channel's existing carriage deals, using Current's channel space to launch the internationally focused news channel Al Jazeera America that August. Al Jazeera America in turn failed in April 2016, after which the channel space created by NWI in 1994 ceased to exist.

After the closure of the channel, the CBC began uploading some of its news programs and reports as clips on CBC.ca for online viewing worldwide. Recently, CBC News Network – the former parent channel of Newsworld International – carries many of the CBC programs formerly seen on Newsworld, and is available worldwide outside of Canada online through paid subscriptions.

== Programming ==
=== Original series ===
Newsworld International produced Special Assignment, a half-hour documentary series hosted by veteran CBC correspondent Bill Cunningham, featuring a different country in each episode. The format included a segment of historical context on the featured country with archive footage narrated by Cunningham, followed by a recap of recent political developments and current events. The program often featured interviews with high-ranking government officials and political insiders. During its run, Special Assignment visited many countries in Europe, East Asia and Latin America as well as countries in Africa and the Caribbean. Reruns of earlier editions often included updated narrations to reflect recent developments.

==== NWI contributors at shutdown ====
- CBC Newsworld/News Network Canada – The National and its weekend substitutes CBC News: Saturday Report and CBC News: Sunday Night, CBC News: Correspondent, The Nature of Things, Hot Type, entertainment show >play, most of its international news output (including Hemispheres, a partnership with the Australian Broadcasting Corporation), as well as NWI's internal newscasts and newsmagazines
- Deutsche Welle Germany – the network's English newscast and its English weekend newsmagazine
- NHK Japan – the network's major English newscast and its English weekend newsmagazine
- CCTV-9 China – the network's major English newscast
- ITV United Kingdom – the domestic Evening News (produced by ITN)

==== Subtitled NWI newscasts discontinued before shutdown ====
- Canada – RDI (Quebec French)
- Mexico – TV Azteca
- Russia – NTV, Channel One

==== Other programming ====
- Washington Outlook with Henry Champ
- World Business
- NWI World Sports

== Former on-air staff ==
=== Anchors ===
Newsworld International was anchored by a team of CBC talent which included

- Henry Champ
- John Dawe
- Terry Glecoff
- Karen Hawryluk
- Chris Henry
- Ron Izawa
- Doreen Kays
- Jordan Kerbel
- Fred Langan
- Paul Lethbridge
- Sandra Lewis
- Sharon Lewis
- Helen Mann
- Jennifer Mossop
- Jim Reed
- Nerene Virgin

== See also ==
- Al Jazeera America - successor in interest to Newsworld International
- CBC News Network - Newsworld's parent channel (then known as CBC Newsworld)
