= Great West Television =

Canadian regional television system

Great West Television (GWTV) is a television system in regional British Columbia, made up of the following stations:

- CKPG, Prince George (owned by Jim Pattison Group; Citytv affiliate)
- CJDC, Dawson Creek (owned by Bell Media; CTV 2 affiliate)
- CFTK, Terrace (owned by Bell Media; CTV 2 affiliate)

With the exception of local news and other local programming, the majority of the programming on CJDC and CFTK comes from CTV 2, while CKPG obtains the majority of its programs from the Rogers Communications-owned Citytv. Syndicated programs from CHUM Limited had also been seen on these stations until October 2006, when CBC Television expanded to a 24-hour schedule and the GWTV stations accordingly dropped all syndicated shows from their schedules to accommodate the new CBC schedule. This arrangement was used by CKPG until August 31, 2008, when it switched affiliations to E!. Beginning September 1, 2009, CKPG switched affiliations to Citytv after the E! system ceased operations. On February 22, 2016, CFTK and CJDC disaffiliated from CBC and became CTV 2 owned and operated stations.

Great West Television is the successor to a previous mini-network in Northern British Columbia, Northern Television. That sub-system folded in the late 1990s, and was reborn as Great West Television, joined by Jim Pattison Group's CKPG-TV.
