= Channel 5 TV stations in Canada =

The following television stations broadcast on digital or analog channel 5 in Canada:

- CFJC-TV-6 in 100 Mile House, British Columbia
- CFTK-TV-2 in Smithers, British Columbia
- CHAU-DT in Carleton, Quebec
- CHRO-TV in Pembroke, Ontario
- CICI-TV in Sudbury, Ontario
- CJDC-TV in Dawson Creek, British Columbia

The following television stations, which are no longer licensed, formerly broadcast on channel 5 in Canada:

- CKBI-TV in Prince Albert, Saskatchewan
- CIHC-TV in Hay River, Northwest Territories
