= Fetv (disambiguation) =

Fetv may refer to:

- fetv, abbreviation for Family Entertainment Television, an American broadcast television network owned by Family Broadcasting Corporation.
- FETV (Panama), a Panamanian television network located in Panama City
- Fe-TV a Texas Spanish-language broadcast television network providing Christian programming to the Hispanic communities
