= Raggs =

Children's television series

- Genre: Animation; Live-action
- Created by: Toni Steedman
- Written by: Kym Goldsworthy (lead writer)
- Directed by: Ian Munro; Ralph Strasser; Peter Nathan; Daniel Nettheim; Jonathan Geraghty
- Starring: April L. Kresken (Raggs); Kimberly Miller Harwell (Trilby)
- Voices of: Justin Rosniak (Raggs, Australian Version); Di Adams (Trilby, Australian Version); Thomas Bromhead (B.Max, Australian Version); Jamie Oxenbould (Pido, Australian Version); Paula Morrell (Razzles, Australian Version)
- Theme music composer: Rebecca Kent Story; Michael McGinnis
- Opening theme: "Raggs TV Theme Song"
- Ending theme: "Raggs TV Theme Song"
- Composers: Fred Story; Rebecca Kent Story; Michael McGinnis; Erin Odani; David Floyd; Barbara Lewis; Jamie Hoover
- Countries of origin: Australia; United States
- Original language: English
- No. of seasons: 3
- No. of episodes: 78

Production
- Executive producers: Noel Price; Toni Steedman
- Running time: 30 minutes
- Production companies: Principal Production; ABC Studios, Sydney (2006–2009); Supplemental Production; Blue Socks Media (2009–2012); Co-production; Raggs LLC; Emulsion Arts; Southern Star International; KQED San Francisco (Public Television prints)

Original release
- Network: Seven Network (Australia); PBS member stations/Qubo (US)
- Release: 2 January 2006 – 18 February 2009

Raggs is a live-action/animated musical-educational television series for children ages 3 to 5 about five anthropomorphic dogs that form a rock 'n' roll band called The Raggs Band. There are 196 half hour episodes and 200 original songs in multiple languages. It was originally produced in Sydney, Australia, with additional production in the United States in English and Spanish. It was first broadcast in Australia on the Seven Network on 2 January 2006. In 2014, The Raggs Band reunited to record 20 classic children's songs.

== Broadcast ==
In the United States, Raggs first aired with a limited release of 26 episodes on PBS stations in select markets beginning 1 June 2007. Later, American Public Television introduced a nationwide broadcast release, which began distribution to additional public television stations on 4 February 2008. The first 60 episodes aired as Season 1, and the next thirteen episodes aired as Season 2 beginning 2 February 2009, with reruns continuing until 1 February 2014.

Raggs aired in the U.S. and Canada on Smile, Qubo, V-me, and Telemundo. It aired in Latin America on FETV Canal-Panama, RTV-Ecuador, Canal Dos-El Salvador, Guest Choice Cable-Dominican Republic and Corporación Televicentro-Honduras. Raggs began broadcasting on SABC 2 in South Africa on 7 May 2018.

Raggs' YouTube channel, RaggsTV, hosts short episodes and animations to classic kids' songs.

== History ==
Raggs was originally created in 1990 by U.S. advertising executive Toni Steedman for her 6-year-old daughter, Alison, as a series of carpool stories. Steedman later used the Raggs characters for a regional mall promotion and advertising campaign. By 2001, the successful mall programs encouraged Steedman, along with former HBO producer Carole Rosen, to create a one-hour music video-inspired pilot called "Pawsuuup," which was shot in Myrtle Beach, South Carolina, and New York City in August 2001. While Steedman shopped the pilot for a production or broadcast partner, The Raggs Band (also known as the Raggs Kids' Club Band because of the regional mall kids' clubs for which Raggs served as mascot) began playing concerts at fairs, festivals and performing arts venues.

In 2005, Steedman and her company, Raggs LLC, entered into a co-production relationship with Southern Star International (now Endemol Australia) to produce the Raggs series for the Seven Network in Sydney, Australia. Production began in 2005 using Alias Maya at the ABC Studios in Sydney, and the first episode of Series 1 began airing daily at 9 am on Seven in January 2006. Series 1 consisted of 65 half hours episodes. Raggs quickly garnered strong ratings and, within a few months of airing, Seven ordered Series 2, an additional 65 episodes. In 2007, Seven ordered Series 3, also 65 episodes, bringing the total to 195 original half hours by 2009. Each episode featured original Raggs’ music, written and produced in the U.S. by Concentrix Music and Sound Design, requiring over 200 original songs for the 195 half hours of shows.

In March 2007, Telemundo, the NBC-owned Spanish language network, and V-me, the public Spanish Language network owned by PBS and by its own company V-me Media Inc., licensed 144 episodes of Raggs in Spanish.

Southern Star distributed Raggs to several countries including Singapore, Bulgaria, South Africa and India. In the U.S., Steedman worked to establish Raggs on public television.

In January 2010, Steedman reacquired Southern Star's distribution and licensing rights under Blue Socks Media LLC. Blue Sock Media LLC, completing a complete consolidation of the worldwide assets, later purchased Raggs LLC. Steedman continues to head Blue Socks Media in Charlotte, North Carolina.

The Raggs characters are used at Grand Palladium family-friendly resorts in the Caribbean and Mexico to host the kids program, "Play at Palladium with Raggs." Features include a live show, disco party, and character breakfast.

=== Palace Theatre 2004 ===
Throughout 2004, the band starred in a 90-minute performance at The Palace Theatre in Myrtle Beach, alongside comic strip cat Garfield. The performances focused on the RAGGS Kids Club Band planning a birthday party for the famous orange cat. Suspecting things, Garfield "won't relax until he gets the surprise".

=== RAGGS Kids Club Band: PAWSUUUP! Tour ===
A DVD was released 17 August 2004, featuring in-concert performances of seven of the band's songs, and three "music videos". The 55-minute-long program was produced by Linda Mendoza of Line by Line Productions and executive produced by Carole Rosen.

The crew included screenwriter Mark Valenti (Rugrats, Hey Arnold!, Totally Spies!), lighting designer Alan Adelman (75+ episodes of Great Performances, Nickelodeon Kids' Choice Awards), music producers Fred and Becky Story (Concentrix Music & Sound), costume designer "Greyseal", and choreographer Hardin Minor (National Dance Institute).

The DVD earned 3.5 out of 4 stars from Suite 101 Family Entertainment film critic Nicholas Moreau, tied for the highest ever rating for an independently produced DVD. The music from the tour was later released as a CD album.

== Raggs Live Around the World ==
The Raggs Band has played more than 2,000 live performances in four continents. In the US, Raggs has performed at many state fairs, basketball games, regional malls, national fundraisers such as the Jerry Lewis MDA Telethon, and parades. Overseas, the Raggs Band has performed at American military bases in Japan, South Korea, Belgium, The Netherlands, Germany, and Iceland.

In Australia, the Raggs Band performed at Westfield Malls, and was one of two children's acts to perform on Carols in the Domain, a nationally televised live musical show.

== Episodes ==
Series	Episodes	Originally released	
Series	Episodes	First released	Last released
1	60	2 January 2006 (Australia); 4 February 2008 (United States)	20 April 2007 (Australia); 25 April 2008 (United States)
2	13	5 May 2008 (Australia); 2 February 2009 (United States)	21 May 2008 (Australia); 18 February 2009 (United States)

=== Series 1 (2006–2008) ===
No. overall	No. in season	Title	Original AUS. air date	Original U.S. air date
1	1	"Color"	2 January 2006	4 February 2008
The dogs can't decide which colored ball to play with. Plus, Razzles learns how to mix colors to create the perfect picture to send to Grandma Fluffy.
2	2	"Size"	3 January 2006	5 February 2008
The dogs learn how to wrap different sized presents to take to a party and Trilby must solve her small flea problem.
3	3	"Faces"	4 January 2006	6 February 2008
B.Max is playing animal explorer while the others pretend to have different animal faces. Also, it is Happy Face Parade Day and Raggs must find his happy face in order to lead the parade.
4	4	"Who Am I?"	5 January 2006	7 February 2008
It is Razzles' birthday and the others have to learn more about her so they can pick the perfect present. Plus, Pido cannot stop pretending to be Super Pido.
5	5	"Winter"	6 January 2006	8 February 2008
The dogs turn the clubhouse into a winter wonderland to prepare for Pido's cousin's visit. Also, B.Max wants to take Great Aunt Woofy some sunflowers, but discovers there are no flowers in the garden.
6	6	"Sharing"	9 January 2006	11 February 2008
It is Puppy Pirate Sharing Day! Instead of sharing, Raggs eats all of Pido's Surprise Pie and tries to cover it up by filling it with his building blocks.
7	7	"Food"	10 January 2006	12 February 2008
Pido's been snacking on junk food and has no energy to play. Plus, Trilby finds out what birds eat while looking after a pet bird.
8	8	"Hot"	11 January 2006	13 February 2008
It is too hot outside for the Egg and Spoon Race Championships, so the dogs find different ways to cool down. Also, Pido makes hot soup on a cold day but now it is too hot to eat.
9	9	"Play"	12 January 2006	14 February 2008
It is Puppy Play Day! Pido and B.Max cannot decide which games to play inside and which to play outside. Plus, the dogs discover it is more fun playing together than alone.
10	10	"Smell"	13 January 2006	15 February 2008
Raggs goes on a 'reverse sniff patrol' to find his lost teddy for the Teddy Bear's Picnic. Also, Pido invents his famous Sneaker Stew to help Trilby regain her sense of smell! Yuk!
11	11	"Hands"	16 January 2006	18 February 2008
Raggs must prepare an act for the Puppy Preschool Hand Show. Also, Razzles must learn how to talk with her hands when she loses her voice.
12	12	"Trees"	17 January 2006	19 February 2008
Pido builds a treehouse--only it is too big. Plus, Trilby plants a "wishing" tree so she can make her wish.
13	13	"Movement"	18 January 2006	20 February 2008
The dogs are putting on a play for the Preschool Move and Groove Show and Raggs can't decide which event to participate in at Shake Your Tails Sports Day.
14	14	"Cold"	19 January 2006	21 February 2008
The dogs are playing in the garden on a cold day when Pido accidentally freezes into a Pido popsicle! Plus, B.Max invents a Frosty Finder when Razzles' ice-cream melts.
15	15	"Pack Away"	20 January 2006	22 February 2008
Packaway Officer Razzles declares an "All Work, No Play Day" until all their mess is put away. Then, the dogs rush to clean up, but now Trilby can't find her tiara!
16	16	"Change"	23 January 2006	25 February 2008
Pido and B.Max invent an identity-changing game. Also, Raggs finds a caterpillar and soon discovers it turns into a butterfly.
17	17	"Day"	24 January 2006	26 February 2008
Tomorrow is Bark and Bury Bones Day so the dogs try to find a way to make today go by faster. Also, Trilby learns why Billy the Bat sleeps all day.
18	18	"Rain"	25 January 2006	27 February 2008
A hole in the roof has the dogs trying to figure out how to catch the raindrops. Plus, Raggs wants to paint the mailbox, but the weather interrupts his plans.
19	19	"New"	26 January 2006	28 February 2008
It is Try Something New Day, but Pido cannot think of anything new to do. Also, Razzles will not play with her ball because she wants to keep it new.
20	20	"Sleep"	27 January 2006	29 February 2008
Raggs' dreams are keeping him awake and Pido can't sleep because he's too excited about the upcoming Tail-Chasing Championships.
21	21	"Family"	30 January 2006	3 March 2008
Raggs finds a lost puppy and must take him back to his real family. Also, the dogs accidentally damage a special hat Razzles is wearing to her family picnic.
22	22	"Sun"	31 January 2006	4 March 2008
Storm clouds interrupt Pido's surfing and the others make an "indoor" sun to cheer him up. Plus, Razzles learns how to be safe in the sun.
23	23	"Job"	1 February 2006	5 March 2008
B.Max has a new play-job - driving a truck! But, his truck breaks down and whose job is it to fix it? Also, Raggs decides his job is to read a book while the others clean-up.
24	24	"Growing"	2 February 2006	6 March 2008
Razzles is upset when she finds out she hasn't grown as much as the others on the puppy growth chart. Plus, Pido excels at growing too many tomatoes, but can he grow anything else?
25	25	"Habits"	3 February 2006	7 March 2008
The dogs find a way to help Trilby break the habit of sucking her thumb. Also, B.Max invents a Habitmaster to help Raggs learn the difference between good and bad habits.
26	26	"Clothes"	5 March 2007	10 March 2008
Everybody's off to the beach, but Raggs keeps putting on the wrong clothes. Plus, the dogs have been invited to a dress-up party, but Razzles can't decide what to wear.
27	27	"Summer"	6 March 2007	11 March 2008
Pido breaks his surfboard and the others try to help him find alternative summer activities. And, Trilby must find something to enter in a summer art show!
28	28	"Fast"	7 March 2007	12 March 2008
Raggs is having a fast day - doing everything too quickly while B. Max wants to find a way to go faster for the upcoming Doggy Races!
29	29	"Safety"	8 March 2007	13 March 2008
Razzles gets carried away with safety gear for playing at the park. Plus, Pido doesn't play safely with his teddy and Dr. B. Max tends to him at Teddy Hospital!
30	30	"Transport"	9 March 2007	14 March 2008
Trilby must decide what form of transportation to use to visit Grandpa Pooch. Plus, B. Max and his teddy take everyone on a rocket ship to the moon.
31	31	"Happy"	13 March 2007	18 March 2008
Raggs is sad about breaking his new airplane and the others must show him that old toys can make you happy too. Plus Razzles invents a Happy Dance!
32	32	"Pets"	12 March 2007	17 March 2008
Pido can't decide on what kind of pet he'd like to have and Trilby must learn how to take care of a pet goldfish named Gilbert!
33	33	"Shapes"	14 March 2007	19 March 2008
B. Max makes a birthday present for Grandma Fluffy out of shapes. Raggs uses shape clues on a treasure map, but discovers the treasure has mysteriously disappeared!
34	34	"Beach"	15 March 2007	20 March 2008
Razzles goes overboard planning for a day at the beach and the dogs surprise Pido with a beach party!
35	35	"Opposites"	16 March 2007	21 March 2008
B. Max must decide what opposite things to take to the Puppy Preschool Opposite Show and Tell Day. Meanwhile, Razzles and Trilby invent an opposite game!
36	36	"Night"	19 March 2007	24 March 2008
Raggs hears noisy night noises and sees funny night shadows... and his friends must help him get back to sleep! And, Razzles wants to make a wish on a shooting star.
37	37	"Dancing"	20 March 2007	25 March 2008
Pido can't stop dancing because it is Doggy Dancing Day. Trilby has the starring role as Snoring Beauty in the Kennel Club Dancing Play and the dogs help her rehearse!
38	38	"Garden"	21 March 2007	26 March 2008
Raggs' enthusiasm for Gold Star Garden Day results in his accidentally vacuuming up B. Max's special flowers. B. Max invents the Gardenscope 2000 to help Trilby solve a gardening problem.
39	39	"Arts & Crafts"	22 March 2007	27 March 2008
Raggs and the band work together to create a new poster for the band. Plus, the dogs make puppets and help Pido put on a Cinderpaws puppet show!
40	40	"Direction"	23 March 2007	28 March 2008
The dogs help teach Raggs directions so that he can earn his Puppy Patrol Club Badge! When Pido stubs his toe and can't bake a cake, everyone offers directions to make a cake... with unusual results.
41	41	"Manners"	26 March 2007	31 March 2008
Raggs teaches his teddy how to have good manners and nobody wants to play with Rude Pirate Razzles until she corrects her bad manners!
42	42	"Forest"	27 March 2007	1 April 2008
It is Funky Forest Day at Puppy Preschool and Pido gets to tell his version of "Little Red Riding Pup." Meanwhile, back at the Clubhouse, Trilby sets up camp in her pretend forest.
43	43	"Water"	28 March 2007	2 April 2008
B. Max's boat unintentionally becomes a submarine and Raggs discovers being a dog-fish isn't all that it seems!
44	44	"Building"	29 March 2007	3 April 2008
Razzles' undertakes a noisy new construction project while Pido uses his culinary skills to build a Gingerbread house.
45	45	"Friends"	30 March 2007	4 April 2008
Trilby makes a gift for her "best friend forever" and the other pups invent imaginary friends!
46	46	"Machines"	2 April 2007	7 April 2008
B. Max is busy inventing a multi-tasking machine for the garden and Razzles may have found a machine that can replace everybody in the band!
47	47	"Sport"	3 April 2007	8 April 2008
Trilby is overly enthusiastic about the upcoming Doggy Sports Day and Pido invents games for everybody to play inside when it rains!
48	48	"Park"	4 April 2007	9 April 2008
Pido's Puppy Patrol Club and B. Max's invention of the day focus on the how much the dogs love to go to the park!
49	49	"Books"	5 April 2007	10 April 2008
The dogs help Razzles find her lost book by cleaning up the clubhouse and Pido creates his own bedtime story using all of the dogs' favorite characters.
50	50	"Slow"	6 April 2007	11 April 2008
It is Slow Sports Day at Puppy Preschool and Trilby tries to do everything in slow motion after reading the "Tortoise and the Hare."
51	51	"Taste"	9 April 2007	14 April 2008
Raggs takes a turn in the kitchen to try different tasty treat recipes while Razzles tries to find her sense of taste after burning her tongue from hot chocolate.
52	52	"Party"	10 April 2007	15 April 2008
B.Max wants to throw a surprise Puppy Party for his friends and the dogs all get invited to Larry the Labrador's dress up party!
53	53	"Holidays"	11 April 2007	16 April 2008
The dogs make up an imaginary vacation tour to help decide where to go and what has to be done before they go!
54	54	"Flying"	12 April 2007	17 April 2008
Razzles needs help rescuing her kite from a tree and Pido takes flight with the use of B. Max's new invention, the Flyboy 500.
55	55	"Farms"	13 April 2007	18 April 2008
The dogs prepare for a Rock-A-Doodle Farm Tour and B. Max invents a farm alarm so everyone won't miss Pido's home cooked breakfast!
56	56	"Space"	16 April 2007	21 April 2008
The dogs are excited to find a space helmet, but realize it is only Dumpster's bowl. Also, Razzles builds her own rocket for school.
57	57	"Pretend"	17 April 2007	22 April 2008
Pido pretends to be a snow-rescue dog and turns the clubhouse into a pretend mountain. Also, B. Max sets up a pretend concert.
58	58	"Dreams"	18 April 2007	23 April 2008
The dogs try to remember their dreams and what they mean!
59	59	"Dinosaurs"	19 April 2007	24 April 2008
Razzles is getting ready for a Dinosaur Party and everyone plays football with a dinosaur egg... but is it a real dinosaur egg?
60	60	"Nature"	20 April 2007	25 April 2008
B. Max works on his Puppy Patrol Nature badge while Trilby makes a video about the animals around the clubhouse.

=== Series 2 (2008–2009) ===
No. overall	No. in season	Title	Original AUS. air date	Original U.S. air date
61	1	"Working Together & Cooperation"	5 May 2008	2 February 2009
Raggs makes a messy cake without any help, and everyone works together to build a great go-cart for speedy Razzles!
62	2	"Keeping Clean"	6 May 2008	3 February 2009
Everyone loves bath time except Pido, and the clubhouse gets a mystery cleaning...did Dumpster do it?
63	3	"Times"	7 May 2008	4 February 2009
Raggs keeps getting his times confused, but B.Max's new invention will help. The dogs also discover there are others ways to tell time without a watch!
64	4	"Love"	8 May 2008	5 February 2009
It is Puppy Love Day and Razzles wants to find a special way to tell her friends how much she loves them and Pido learns how to take care of the things he loves the best.
65	5	"Sound & Noise"	9 May 2008	6 February 2009
It is a noisy day at the clubhouse with Raggs' new amplifier and Trilby's new noisemaker that confuses everybody with sounds of lions, trains and elephants.
66	6	"Big & Small"	12 May 2008	9 February 2009
Raggs wants to give a big present, but finds out that good things come in small packages too. And, Pido must find a way to make a big backdrop for the band from small pieces of paper.
67	7	"All Kinds of Moves"	13 May 2008	10 February 2009
It is a group howl when the dogs learn different kinds of moves and that moving furniture around the clubhouse can make things confusing.
68	8	"Try New Things"	14 May 2008	11 February 2009
While B. Max is trying to learn to eat the new Whole Grain Doggie Puffs, Pido can't decide between his old and new drums.
69	9	"Exploring Transportation"	15 May 2008	12 February 2009
The dogs discover that how you travel on a trip doesn't matter as long as your friends are along. And Trilby must find a way to safely transport Charlene the Chicken's eggs.
70	10	"Movement & Balance"	16 May 2008	13 February 2009
The dogs learn that, whether it is dancing or surfing, you have to practice to have good movement and balance.
71	11	"Conserving & Exploring Water"	19 May 2008	16 February 2009
Uh oh, Razzles has left the hose running by mistake and the water overflowed on the ground. With one bucket of water left - they use B. Max's invention to measure how much they can each use to brush their teeth, wash their paws and wash their dishes. Without any more water, can Dumpster help them figure out how to get more? When the pups go on a pretend journey to the bottom of the ocean, they discover that there are lots of different animals that live under water. Raggs wants to continue his exploration, so the rest of the pups pretend to be all sorts of sea creatures.
72	12	"Being a Good Sport & Practice"	20 May 2008	17 February 2009
The puppies are planning their own sports day and when Pido is encouraged to play, he wins, and then wants to race for everything so that he can win. Luckily, he learns the valuable lesson that sports are even better when they are played for fun. Chasing your tail is the best! Razzles takes over as coach of the relay team and the dogs soon learn that being positive and encouraging is much more fun for everyone.
73	13	"Appreciating Stories & the Library"	21 May 2008	18 February 2009
While Trilby is reading her book, The Lost Labrador, she accidentally gets it dirty and cannot see through the dirt to see how Davinda Dishlicker solved the mystery. Where can Trilby go to find out how the story ended? Raggs discovers that reading books can take you to lots of exciting places without even leaving the clubhouse. Raggs has so much fun using his imagination.
