= Indian (show) =

Czech internet show

INDIAN is a Czech internet show about video game produced by MediaRealms, based in Prague-Ďáblice, which took over audiovisual production from FiolaSoft and GODS studios. The show used to be broadcast on the TV channels Metropol, Pohoda and TV Pětka. The editors currently mainly produce individual reviews, shorter thematic videos and news summaries on YouTube and publish articles on the Indian-tv.cz website.

== History ==
The predecessor of Indian was FreewareWorld broadcast on PG24. It was moderated by Filip Kraucher (Fiola) and Ladislav Nosákovec (Nosi). The first episode of Indian was released in February 2008 on their website. From April 2012 until the end of January 2013, show was broadcast by TV Metropol and TV Pětka. After the bankruptcy of TV Pětka, the show briefly moved to YouTube. Since May 2013, the program has been broadcast by TV Pohoda. In February 2013, an internet side project Indiana: Creeprovinky was launched. The theme and screenplay were written by David Fišer. Creeprovinka is no longer broadcast.

In 2013, Indian lost its previous studio and started a campaign on Startovač, where it collected 110,407 CZK. They received more than five times the required amount. In January 2014, FiolaSoft studio launched a second project – Movie news, reviewing the latest movies. In 2019, this show was canceled and replaced by the NerdFix project. In 2019, the Indian project was already distributed by MediaRealms. As of January 2020, Indian has moved fully into the internet environment due to the declining interest of the television audience. At the beginning of 2021, the HARDWARE TEST program stopped broadcasting and was moved to the new TechFeed project.
