= TV Gazeta (Acre) =

TV Gazeta (ZYP 320)
- Rio Branco, Acre; Brazil
- Channels: Digital: 36 (UHF); Virtual: 11

Programming
- Affiliations: Record

Ownership
- Owner: Grupo Recol; (Rádio e Televisão Norte Ltda.)

History
- Founded: 1989
- First air date: February 2, 1990
- Former call signs: ZYA 202 (1990-2018)
- Former channel numbers: Analog: 11 (VHF, 1990–2018)
- Former affiliations: Rede Manchete (1990-1999); RedeTV! (1999-2001); CNT (2001-2002)

Technical information
- Licensing authority: ANATEL
- ERP: 2.5 kW
- Transmitter coordinates: 9°57′42.2″S 67°49′14.9″W

Links
- Public license information: Profile
- Website: www.agazeta.net

TV Gazeta (channel 11) is a Brazilian television station based in Rio Branco, capital of the state of Acre that is affiliated to Record. It is owned by Grupo Recol, which also controls the Agazeta.net portal and several enterprises in other sectors, such as Recol Distribuidora, Recol Veículos, Recol Motors, Recolfarma and the Acrebeer beverage distribution network.

== History ==
VHF Channel 11 in Rio Branco began operations in mid-1989, with the provisional name of TV Norte, only relaying Rede Manchete's programming, and had been implemented by Grupo Recol, owned by businessman Roberto Moura. At the same time, Moura teamed up with businessmen Silvio Martinello and Roberto Vaz, who ran the newspaper A Gazeta do Acre and the radio station 93 FM (currently Gazeta FM), forming Rede Gazeta de Comunicação, and migrated the outlets to the future TV headquarters, which was being built in the Vila Ivonete neighborhood. A few days before its inauguration, on January 21, 1990, President José Sarney granted a generating concession for channel 11, which made it possible years later to expand its signal to other regions of Acre.

TV Gazeta was officially inaugurated on February 2, 1990, in a ceremony attended by several authorities, such as the state governor, Flaviano Melo, and Bishop Dom Moacyr Grechi, who blessed the station's facilities. In its first years on air, it maintained a strong presence in local journalism and was prominent on national television, covering events such as the trial of those responsible for the murder of environmentalist Chico Mendes, still in 1990, in addition to the fire that occurred in the Legislative Assembly of Acre and the murder of governor Edmundo Pinto, both in 1992. Its first news program, Gazeta em Manchete, remains on the air to this day with the same name, despite changes in affiliation.

With the bankruptcy of Rede Manchete in 1999, TV Gazeta was one of the remaining affiliates that accompanied the transition to RedeTV!. However, in 2001, it was one of the first stations to leave the network, migrating to CNT, this being the first in a series of affiliation changes involving Rio Branco's television channels in the early 2000s. After about a year of affiliation, TV Gazeta left CNT in 2002 and migrated to Rede Record, which had not renewed the affiliation contract it had had since 1996 with TV5 (which in turn, became an affiliate of RedeTV!, and a year later, of Rede Bandeirantes).

In February 2004, when it completed 14 years on air, TV Gazeta invested in expanding its signal, with the implementation of retransmitters that increased its coverage to 80% of the state of Acre, even reaching parts of Bolivia in its border regions with Brazil. In 2008, with the time zone changes in the state of Acre and the new rating rules for television programs, TV Gazeta stopped showing Record's programming in real time, starting to delay its daily programming by around one or two hours compared to the network.

On August 14, 2013, the founder and owner of TV Gazeta, Roberto Moura, died at the age of 60, victim of a heart attack while traveling on business in São Paulo. The businessman's death was highlighted in a special session shown by the station, with the presentation of Alan Rick, who showed details of his business career and read messages of condolence left by important figures in the state. After Roberto's death, his son, Marcello Moura, became the new owner of the station and Grupo Recol.

== Technical information ==
Virtual channel	Digital channel	Screen	Content
11.1	36 UHF	1080i	TV5/Band's main schedule

The station began its digital transmissions on October 31, 2012, through UHF channel 36 for Rio Branco and nearby areas. At the same time, it also started producing all of its local programming in high definition.

Based on the federal decree transitioning Brazilian TV stations from analog to digital signals, TV Gazeta, as well as the other stations in Rio Branco, ceased broadcasting on VHF channel 5 on October 31, 2018, following the official ANATEL roadmap.

== Programming ==
In addition to retransmitting national programming from Record, TV Gazeta produces and broadcasts the following programs:

- Balanço Geral AC Manhã: News, com Márcio Souza
- Gazeta Alerta: Police news, com Gabriel Rotta
- Gazeta em Manchete: Main news, com Itaan Arruda
- Gazeta Entrevista: Interview program, com Astério Moreira

Several other programs made up the station's schedule and were discontinued:

- Acre Rural
- Bom Dia Cidade
- Câmera Gazeta
- Gazeta Esporte
- Geração Gazeta
- Jogo do Poder AC
- Marilze Braga & How Campos
- Music Mania
- Programa Antônio Klemer
