= Pilot Mountain (British Columbia) =

Mountain in British Columbia, Canada

- Location within British Columbia

Highest point
- Elevation: 995 m (3,264 ft)
- Prominence: 230 m (750 ft)
- Listing: Mountains of British Columbia
- Coordinates: 54°02′48″N 122°53′37″W

Geography
- Location: British Columbia, Canada
- District: Cariboo Land District
- Topo map: NTS 92J2 Whistler

Pilot Mountain is a mountain located 17 km (11 mi) northwest of the city limits of Prince George, British Columbia. The mountain top is used as a radio communications site by users including CKPG-TV channel 2.
