= CityWest =

Telecoms provider in British Columbia, Canada

CityWest Cable and Telephone Corporation
- Trade name: CityWest
- Formerly: CityTel
- Type: Municipally owned corporation
- Industry: Telecommunications
- Founded: 1910; 116 years ago in Prince Rupert, British Columbia
- Area served: Prince Rupert and surrounding areas
- Owner: City of Prince Rupert

CityWest Cable and Telephone Corporation, operating as CityWest, is a Canadian municipally-owned telecommunications holding company which provides telephone, cable television, and internet services in Prince Rupert, British Columbia, and the surrounding regions. CityWest also purchased Monarch Cablesystems' assets, which were split between the former CityTel and Shaw Communications.

It has been in operation since 1910. On August 10, 2005, the City of Prince Rupert (the company's sole shareholder) reorganized CityTel into a new company, called the CityWest Group of Companies, through the holding company "CityWest Cable and Telephone Corporation", or CityWest, as it is now known. On October 1, 2005, the company had purchased all of Monarch Cablesystems's Northern British Columbia cable assets, and its service area had expanded accordingly. CityTel had contracted Ledcor Group of Companies to construct a fibre-optic link to Terrace, and offered digital cable television in that area and in Prince Rupert, with digital cable in Kitimat.

On December 13, 2013, CityWest announced its exit from providing cellular services and that its existing cellular customers would be served by Telus.

In September 2020 CityWest announced a $9 Million expansion into Vanderhoof. In August 2021 CityWest announced a continued Southern expansion into Hornby and Denman Islands and also announced its intention to expand into Cortes Island, Bella Coola, Bamfield, Tow Hill, Tlell, and Zeballos. In November 2021 CityWest's $45.4 Million dollar Connected Coast project to better connect roughly 140 communities across the North Coast of BC began. In January 2022 the initial subsea fibre-optic cable for the Connected Coast was laid. In March 2022 a new partnership between CityWest and the Gitxaala Nation was announced to bring improved Internet to Kitkatla through the Connected Coast project.

== Services offered ==
CityWest offers fibre optic, phone service, television, and internet access to residential and business customers. Primarily in rural and Indigenous communities along the BC coast.

== Communities served ==
- Bella Coola
- Burns Lake
- Cortes Island
- Daajing Giids
- Dease Lake
- Denman Island
- Fort St. James
- Fraser Lake
- Gillies Bay
- Hartley Bay
- Hazelton
- Hornby Island
- Houston
- Iskut
- Kitimat
- Kitkatla
- Kitwanga
- Kyuquot
- Lax Kw'alaams
- Mackenzie
- Masset
- Metlakatla
- Prince Rupert
- Port Edward
- Quadra Island
- Sayward
- Skidegate
- Smithers / Telkwa
- Terrace / Thornhill
- Tlell
- Vanderhoof

== See also ==
- Monarch Cablesystems
