= CIFL =

CIFL may refer to:

- CIFL (AM), a radio station (1450 AM) licensed to Fraser Lake, British Columbia, Canada
- Continental Indoor Football League, an indoor football league founded in 2006.
