= CJDC (AM) =

Radio station in Dawson Creek

Coordinates: 55.7577°N 120.2268°W

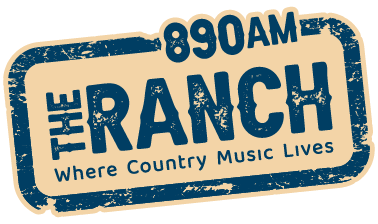
- Dawson Creek, British Columbia; Canada
- Broadcast area: Peace River Regional District
- Frequency: 890 kHz
- Branding: The Ranch AM 890

Programming
- Format: Country
- Affiliations: Premiere Networks

Ownership
- Owner: Vista Radio

History
- First air date: December 15, 1947
- Call sign meaning: Dawson Creek

Technical information
- Class: B
- Power: 10,000 watts
- Repeater: CJDC-1-FM 92.7 MHz

Links
- Webcast: Listen Live
- Website: My Peace Region Now

CJDC is a Canadian radio station, broadcasting at 890 AM in Dawson Creek, British Columbia, with a repeater broadcasting at 92.7 FM in Tumbler Ridge, British Columbia. The station, owned by Vista Radio, airs a country music radio format, and as of April 14, 2025, is branded as CJDC AM 890 The Ranch. CJDC broadcasts with a power of 10,000 watts day and night, using a non-directional antenna during daytime and a two-tower directional antenna during nighttime, to protect two American Class-A clear-channel stations broadcasting on the same frequency – KBBI (Homer, Alaska) and WLS (Chicago, Illinois) – from interference by skywave propagation. Its broadcast area reaches Valleyview, Alberta, Grande Prairie, Chetwynd, British Columbia, Fort St. John, British Columbia, Cecil Lake, Rose Prairie, and many other rural communities in the Peace Region. It is one of the few stations that is received clearly by many people in the rural areas of the Peace Region.

== History ==
The station was launched on December 15, 1947, by local broadcaster Radio Station CJDC (Dawson Creek, BC) Ltd. as an affiliate of the CBC's Trans-Canada Network, broadcasting on 1350 AM. In 1959, the company also launched CJDC-TV, a CBC Television affiliate, and changed its corporate name to CJDC Ltd. At a later date, the corporate name was changed to Mega Communications.

The station adopted its current frequency of 890 AM in 1986, and added a translator on 92.7 FM at Tumbler Ridge in 1988 with the callsign CJDC-1-FM.

The stations were sold to Okanagan Skeena Broadcasters in 1997, to Telemedia in 1999. Telemedia was later taken over by Standard Radio in 2002, and most of Standard's assets, including the CJDC stations, were in turn acquired by Astral in 2007, and were sold to Bell Media in 2013.

On May 28, 2019, as part of a country-wide format reorganization by Bell, CJDC rebranded as Pure Country 890.

On February 8, 2024, Bell announced a restructuring that included the sale of 45 of its 103 radio stations to seven buyers, subject to approval by the CRTC, including CJDC, which is to be sold to Vista Radio. The application was approved on February 13, 2025.

The sale took effect April 14, 2025, and Vista rebranded the station to 890 The Ranch maintaining the country format.

== Former logos ==
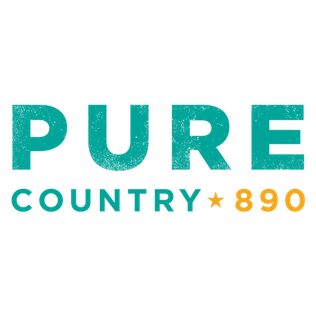
