= CKKN-FM =

Radio station in Prince George, British Columbia

- Prince George, British Columbia; Canada
- Frequency: 101.3 MHz
- Branding: 101.3 The River

Programming
- Language: English
- Format: Hot adult contemporary

Ownership
- Owner: Jim Pattison Group
- Sister stations: CKDV-FM; CKPG-TV

History
- First air date: 1981
- Former call signs: CIOI-FM (1981–1995)

Technical information
- Licensing authority: CRTC
- Class: B
- ERP: 9.1 kW
- HAAT: 75.5 metres (248 ft)
- Transmitter coordinates: 53°54′11″N 122°42′10″W

Links
- Webcast: Listen live
- Website: 1013theriver.ca

CKKN-FM (101.3 MHz) is a radio station, which broadcasts a hot adult contemporary format in Prince George, British Columbia, Canada. The station is owned by the Jim Pattison Group, which also owns sister stations CKDV-FM and CKPG-TV.

== History ==
The station was launched in 1981 by Q Broadcasting, as a country station with the call sign CIOI-FM and the brand name Country 101. Q Broadcasting sold its holdings to Monarch Broadcasting in 1990. Monarch converted the station to the CKKN call sign in 1995, and to its current format in 1999. The stations were in turn sold to Pattison in 2000, and became hot adult contemporary Hits FM at that time. By 2004, the station shifted to adult contemporary; ratings remained dismal from its adult top 40 format after the switch. It returned to hot adult contemporary as The River by 2005.

== Transmitters ==
Rebroadcasters of CKKN-FM
City of licence	Identifier	Frequency	Power	Class	RECNet
Mackenzie	CKKN-FM-2	105.7 FM	50 watts	LP	Query
McLeod Lake	CKKN-FM-1	92.5 FM	24 watts	LP	Query
