= CH5 =

The abbreviations CH5, Ch5, and variations thereof may mean:

- CH^{+}_{5}, the chemical formula of methanium, an organic ion
- CH5 Deeside, part of the CH postcode area, Great Britain
- Bacteriocin CH5, an antibacterial produced by Lactobacillus acidophilus
- Chile Route 5, a highway in Chile
- C_{H}5, a type of cirrus cloud
- Channel 5 (disambiguation), a common name of television networks, channels and stations around the world
- 22291 Heitifer (1989 CH_{5}), a main-belt asteroid
