= Buřtcajk =

2007 Czech TV program

- Starring: Zdeněk izer
- Country of origin: Czech Republic
- No. of seasons: 1
- No. of episodes: 14

Production
- Running time: 28 minutes

Original release
- Network: TV Pětka
- Release: January 8, 2007 – June 24, 2013

Buřtcajk was an entertaining program by Zdeněk Izer, which was broadcast on TV Pětka. The show included parodies of Czech shows and also several skits. 14 episodes were filmed, including a special episode on New Year's Eve. In addition to Zdeněk Izer, the program also features Milan Pitkin, Šárka Vaňková and Zdeněk Vencl. The program was broadcast during the existence of TV Pětka from October 2012 to February 2013.

== Parts of the show ==
The program was divided into several thematic parts.

=== Last minute ===
Last Minute was a parody of various travel shows.

=== Be in ===
Be in (Buď in) was a parody of the show "VIP News" with Šárka Vaňková.

=== Under the magnifying glass ===
Under the magnifying glass was a parody of the show Black Sheep with Vlado Štancel.

=== Auto moto corner ===
Auto moto corner was a parody of the ČT program "Auto moto revue".

=== Balls don't lie ===
Balls Don't Lie was a parody of the "Call the Fortune Tellers" variety show.

=== Domum sanitas ===
Domum sanitas was a parody of various health shows. This part only appeared in the special 14th episode.

=== Brewhouse ===
Brewhouse was a parody of various shows about cooking, i.e. about cooking in the kitchen. Like the Domum sanitas part, this part also appeared only in the 14th volume.
