= Michelle Lang =

Canadian journalist

- Born: 31 January 1975; Vancouver, British Columbia, Canada
- Died: 30 December 2009 (aged 34); Kandahar, Afghanistan
- Education: Simon Fraser University
- Occupation: Reporter
- Notable credit: Calgary Herald

Michelle Justine Lang (31 January 1975 – 30 December 2009) was a Canadian journalist. Lang was a Calgary Herald reporter and the first Canadian journalist to die in the war in Afghanistan.

== Biography ==
Born and raised in Vancouver, British Columbia, Lang was an alumnus of Magee Secondary School and Simon Fraser University. Her first job as a reporter was at the Prince George Free Press. She later moved on to Moose Jaw Times Herald and the Regina Leader-Post, then moved to Calgary to become a print journalist for the Calgary Herald. She won a National Newspaper Award in 2008 for best beat reporting, for her reporting on national and provincial health-care issues.

Lang was on a six-week assignment to Afghanistan for the Herald and Canwest News Service when the armoured military vehicle in which she was riding struck a roadside bomb. Four Canadian soldiers were also killed in the blast.

== See also ==
- List of journalists killed during the War in Afghanistan (2001–present)
- Embedded journalism
