= Kanal 5 =

Kanal 5 is the name of a number of television stations whose names translate into English as "Channel 5".

- Kanal 5 (Croatia), a Croatian station
- Kanal 5 (Denmark), a Danish station
- Kanal 5 (North Macedonia), a Macedonian station
- Kanal 5 (Sweden), a Swedish station
- 5 Kanal, a Ukrainian station

== See also ==
- Channel 5 (disambiguation)
