= CFTK-TV =

Television station in British Columbia, Canada

Terrace, British Columbia; Canada
- Channels: Analog: 3 (VHF); Digital: allocated 35 (UHF)
- Branding: CFTK-TV; CTV2 Terrace (alternate)

Programming
- Affiliations: CTV2

Ownership
- Owner: Bell Media Inc.
- Sister stations: CIVT-DT, CIVI-DT, CJDC-TV

History
- First air date: November 1, 1962
- Former affiliations: CBC Television (1962–2016)
- Call sign meaning: taken from its former sister radio station

Technical information
- Licensing authority: CRTC
- ERP: 13.8 kW
- HAAT: 453.5 m (1,488 ft)
- Transmitter coordinates: 54°31′4″N 128°28′21″W
- Translator(s): see § Transmitters

Links
- Website: CFTK-TV

CFTK-TV (analog channel 3) is a television station in Terrace, British Columbia, Canada, airing CTV2 programming. Owned and operated by Bell Media, it is part of the Great West Television system. CFTK-TV's studios are located on Lazelle Avenue in Terrace, and its transmitter is located on Thornhill Mountain. The station operates rebroadcast transmitters in Prince Rupert (CFTK-TV-1, channel 6) and Smithers (CFTK-TV-2, channel 5).

== History ==
CFTK went on the air for the first time on November 1, 1962. Standard Broadcasting acquired CFTK from Telemedia in 2002. Telemedia had owned CFTK since 1999.

The station was originally part of a two-station "sub-network" called Northern Television (NTV) since the early 1990s, until 2002, when it was disbanded and re-launched as Great West Television (joined by CKPG-TV). NTV and GWTV's programming consisted of mainly American shows imported and aired on CHUM Limited's NewNet/A-Channel stations, mixed with CBC's own programming.

Great West Television largely ceased to exist in October 2006. With CBC Television going to a 24-hour schedule beginning in October 2006, CFTK-TV dropped all of its syndicated programming and increased the amount of CBC programming in its schedule outside of local news. This, in effect, made CFTK-TV a semi-satellite of Vancouver's CBUT for the remainder of its CBC affiliation.

Astral Media acquired CFTK in the fall of 2007 as part of its acquisition of most of Standard Broadcasting's assets.

On March 16, 2012, it was announced that Bell Canada would acquire Astral Media for $3.38 billion. However, the deal was rejected by the Canadian Radio-television and Telecommunications Commission (CRTC) that fall. Bell submitted a revised takeover proposal in 2013, in which it would sell off a number of assets but keep CFTK. Bell has committed to maintaining the station's current conditions of license, including its CBC affiliation, until the end of its license term in 2017. Bell owns two networks of its own, CTV and CTV2, which compete with CBC. The deal was approved by the Competition Bureau in March 2013, and by the CRTC in June 2013.

On October 28, 2015, the CRTC made public an application by Bell to disaffiliate CFTK from CBC Television effective February 22, 2016, at which point the station is scheduled to begin airing programming from Bell's CTV Two system. Bell and the CBC agreed to an early termination of CFTK's affiliation agreement on October 5. Any TV service providers serving the region and not already carrying a CBC Television owned-and-operated station on their basic services (in this case, CBUT) would have to add one by the disaffiliation date in order to comply with CRTC regulations. It is now available on cable and satellite effective the same day.

On October 4, 2017, Bell Media applied for a new transmitter in Smithers to repeat CFTK-TV. The application was approved on December 12, 2017. The transmitter, which broadcasts on channel 5, is a reactivation of a former CBC-owned transmitter, CBCY-TV-2, which rebroadcast CBUT Vancouver until July 31, 2012, when budget cuts forced the closure of the CBC and Radio-Canada's remaining analogue transmitters. This repeater was renamed CFTK-TV-2 upon its reactivation.

== Newscasts ==
CFTK newscasts are one hour and air at 6 and 11 p.m. weekdays. A 30-minute news recap called Week in Review airs on weekends.

== Transmitters ==
Station	City of licence	Channel	ERP	HAAT	Transmitter coordinates
CFTK-TV-1	Prince Rupert	6 (VHF)	2.44 kW	593.8 m (1,948 ft)	54°17′4″N 130°18′54″W
CFTK-TV-2	Smithers	5 (VHF)	0.155 kW	242 m (794 ft)	54°44′26.88″N 126°58′55.20″W
