= Hixon, British Columbia =

Coordinates: 53°25′12″N 122°35′09″W

Location of Hixon in British Columbia

Hixon is an unincorporated community 2.48 square kilometres in size at the northern edge of the Cariboo region of the Central Interior region of British Columbia, Canada. It is part of Electoral Area E in the Regional District of Fraser-Fort George. It is located on the east (left) bank of the Fraser River, and is about midway along BC Highway 97 between the cities of Prince George (N) and Quesnel (S). It was named for Hixon Creek, which in turn is named for a 19th-century prospector in the area, by the name of Joseph Foster Hixon, who found gold here on the banks of the Fraser River back around 1866. As of 2021, it has a population of 239, representing a 13.7 percent decline from 2016.

== Climate ==
Climate data for Hixon
Month	Jan	Feb	Mar	Apr	May	Jun	Jul	Aug	Sep	Oct	Nov	Dec	Year
Record high °C (°F)	14.0 (57.2)	14.0 (57.2)	20.0 (68.0)	31.1 (88.0)	37.5 (99.5)	34.5 (94.1)	36.1 (97.0)	36.5 (97.7)	35.5 (95.9)	26.5 (79.7)	17.0 (62.6)	11.0 (51.8)	37.5 (99.5)
Mean daily maximum °C (°F)	−2.9 (26.8)	0.9 (33.6)	6.8 (44.2)	13.0 (55.4)	18.2 (64.8)	21.6 (70.9)	24.1 (75.4)	23.9 (75.0)	18.4 (65.1)	10.5 (50.9)	1.7 (35.1)	−2.4 (27.7)	11.2 (52.2)
Daily mean °C (°F)	−6.7 (19.9)	−3.8 (25.2)	0.7 (33.3)	5.9 (42.6)	10.8 (51.4)	14.5 (58.1)	16.7 (62.1)	16.2 (61.2)	11.6 (52.9)	5.4 (41.7)	−1.6 (29.1)	−5.8 (21.6)	5.3 (41.5)
Mean daily minimum °C (°F)	−10.5 (13.1)	−8.6 (16.5)	−5.3 (22.5)	−1.3 (29.7)	3.3 (37.9)	7.4 (45.3)	9.2 (48.6)	8.5 (47.3)	4.7 (40.5)	0.3 (32.5)	−4.9 (23.2)	−9.3 (15.3)	−0.5 (31.1)
Record low °C (°F)	−44.0 (−47.2)	−39.4 (−38.9)	−30.0 (−22.0)	−15.0 (5.0)	−6.1 (21.0)	−1.0 (30.2)	1.0 (33.8)	−2.5 (27.5)	−6.0 (21.2)	−26.5 (−15.7)	−35.5 (−31.9)	−40.5 (−40.9)	−44.0 (−47.2)
Average precipitation mm (inches)	64.5 (2.54)	32.2 (1.27)	32.7 (1.29)	36.7 (1.44)	46.2 (1.82)	68.5 (2.70)	70.5 (2.78)	47.3 (1.86)	57.9 (2.28)	66.4 (2.61)	63.4 (2.50)	58.8 (2.31)	645.0 (25.39)
Average rainfall mm (inches)	12.3 (0.48)	7.6 (0.30)	14.9 (0.59)	31.5 (1.24)	45.5 (1.79)	68.5 (2.70)	70.5 (2.78)	47.3 (1.86)	57.9 (2.28)	59.5 (2.34)	28.2 (1.11)	8.8 (0.35)	452.4 (17.81)
Average snowfall cm (inches)	52.2 (20.6)	24.6 (9.7)	17.9 (7.0)	5.2 (2.0)	0.7 (0.3)	0.0 (0.0)	0.0 (0.0)	0.0 (0.0)	0.0 (0.0)	6.9 (2.7)	35.2 (13.9)	50.0 (19.7)	192.6 (75.8)
Average precipitation days (≥ 0.2 mm)	14.6	10.4	11.2	10.9	14.3	15.9	15.4	12.8	13.4	16.2	15.4	13.9	164.3
Average rainy days (≥ 0.2 mm)	3.7	3.8	6.7	9.4	14.1	15.9	15.4	12.8	13.4	14.9	8.1	2.9	121.0
Average snowy days (≥ 0.2 cm)	12.3	7.5	6.3	2.2	0.3	0.0	0.0	0.0	0.0	2.4	9.5	11.8	52.3
