= Panavisión =

Defunct Panamanian television channel

Panavisión/Telecinco
- Country: Panama
- Broadcast area: Panama City, Panama

Programming
- Language: Spanish

Ownership
- Owner: Panavisión del Istmo

History
- Launched: 23 October 1983
- Closed: 31 March 1992
- Replaced by: FETV

Availability

Terrestrial
- VHF: 5

Panavisión, later renamed Telecinco, was a Panamanian over-the-air television network owned by Panavisión del Istmo. It was an attempt to break from the TVN-RPC monopoly (alongside Telemetro) but the channel was eventually sold in the late 1980s, renamed Telecinco and shut down in 1990. It was given to the Catholic Church, who took over the frequency and launched FETV.

== History ==
Panavisión, like Telemetro, was created as a result of constitutional reforms in 1980, ending the monopoly of the Eleta and Chiari families. Panavisión del Istmo was owned by Vice-president Ricardo de la Espriella, and was given the license to operate on channel 5 in Panamá Province. Broadcasts started on October 21, 1983 and included relay stations to cover all nine provinces within a year from launch.

Although Panavisión was an impartial network, the station was later taken by military, which ultimately cost De la Espriella its television license, upon losing support from President Manuel Noriega. The exit of Nicolás Ardito Barletta from its management allowed Arturo del Valle to buy the station. Eventually Del Valle abandoned control of the station, causing Panavisión to file for bankruptcy and cease operations.

The new administration took over in 1989 and rebadged it as Telecinco. Broadcasts were suspended due to the invasion in late 1989. The suspension wasn't lifted until April 1990, which, like the other Panamanian channels, restricted its programming to the Catholic program Los del Camino.

On June 28, 1990, part of Panavisión del Istmo's public assets were auctioned, including transmitters, some of which had over 1000 watts of power, and in Coclé, Veraguas and Chiriquí, a transmitting tower, relay transmitters, audio mixers, video recorders, camcorders, chargers and batteries for cameras. The rest was auctioned to Corporación Financiera Nacional (COFINA), which was put into re-evaluation.

The frequency and equipment was acquired by FETV in February 1991, in a sale approved on July 10; FETV took over on April 1, 1992.
