= CJDC-TV =

Television station in Dawson Creek

- Dawson Creek, British Columbia; Canada
- Channels: Analog: 5 (VHF); Digital: allocated 31 (UHF)
- Branding: CJDC-TV; CTV2 Dawson Creek (alternate)

Programming
- Affiliations: CTV2

Ownership
- Owner: Bell Media Inc.
- Sister stations: CIVT-DT, CIVI-DT, CFTK-TV

History
- First air date: January 15, 1959
- Former affiliations: CBC Television (1959–2016)
- Call sign meaning: taken from its former sister radio station

Technical information
- Licensing authority: CRTC
- ERP: 9.5 kW
- HAAT: 312.7 m (1,026 ft)
- Transmitter coordinates: 55°43′44″N 120°26′47″W
- Translator(s): see § Transmitters

Links
- Website: CJDC-TV

CJDC-TV (analog channel 5) is a television station in Dawson Creek, British Columbia, Canada, airing CTV2 programming. Owned and operated by Bell Media, it is part of the Great West Television system. CJDC-TV's studios are located on 102 Avenue and 9 Street in Dawson Creek, and its transmitter is located near 233 Road in Peace River.

== History ==
CJDC first went on the air on January 15, 1959, and was originally owned by Mega Communications, the owner of CJDC radio. It was the Michaud family that introduced radio and television to the BC Peace River region. Henry and Mike Michaud, also known as Mike Laverne, started the station in 1959. Before CJDC-TV went to air Mike Laverne went to Toronto to visit advertising agencies and hire a news editor to run the radio and television news services. Mike was successful in getting some new national ads for CJDC-TV and hired Australian-born Val Wake as the first news editor of the station's newscast. At the start the only visuals used by the newscast were 35mm transparencies.

The station was originally part of a two-station "sub-network" called Northern Television (NTV) since the early 1990s, until 2002, when it was disbanded and re-launched as Great West Television (joined by CKPG-TV). NTV and GWTV's programming consisted of mainly American shows imported and aired on CHUM Limited's NewNet/A-Channel stations, mixed with CBC's own programming. Great West Television itself would later become virtually non-existent in October 2006, when the CBC expanded its programming schedule to 24 hours a day and the GWTV affiliates accordingly dropped all syndicated programming to accommodate the new CBC schedule, leaving only local news as the remaining parts of GWTV.

CJDC was owned by Standard Broadcasting from 2002 until the fall of 2007, when Astral Media acquired most of the company's assets.

On March 16, 2012, it was announced that Bell Canada would acquire Astral Media for $3.38 billion. However, the deal was rejected by the Canadian Radio-television and Telecommunications Commission (CRTC) that fall. Bell submitted a revised takeover proposal in 2013, in which it will sell off a number of assets but keep CJDC. Bell has committed to maintaining the station's current conditions of license, including its CBC affiliation, until the end of its license term in 2017. Bell owns two networks of its own, CTV and CTV2, which compete with CBC. The deal was approved by the Competition Bureau in March 2013, and by the CRTC in June 2013.

On October 28, 2015, the CRTC made public an application by Bell to disaffiliate CJDC from CBC Television effective February 22, 2016, switching to CTV2. Bell and the CBC agreed to an early termination of CJDC's affiliation agreement on October 5. Any TV service providers serving the region and not already carrying a CBC Television owned-and-operated station such as CBUT Vancouver (or potentially CBXT or CBRT from Alberta, in light of Dawson Creek being on Mountain Time) on their basic services will have to add one by the disaffiliation date in order to comply with CRTC regulations. It is now available on cable and satellite effective the same day.

== Programming ==
CJDC currently produces two hour-long newscasts at 6 p.m. and 11 p.m. on weeknights. A simulcast of the 5 p.m. edition of CTV News Vancouver is carried on weekdays, and the 6 p.m. and 11 p.m. newscasts from CTV2 Victoria sister station CIVI-DT are aired on weekends. The station has some schedule variance in comparison to CIVI; due to its hour-long late-night newscast unlike other CTV2 stations, it does not air The Tonight Show Starring Jimmy Fallon, and a rotating strip of outdoors programming is aired at midnight before Late Night with Seth Meyers. It covers local news in northeastern British Columbia and western Alberta.

Unlike its sister station CFTK-TV in Terrace, CJDC is located in the Mountain Time Zone. Thus, its supper-hour newscast does not directly compete with the high-rated News Hour on Global BC and as such, it receives respectable ratings (according to Numeris). During daylight saving time, CJDC is also located in the Pacific Time Zone.

== Transmitters ==
Station	City of licence	Channel	ERP	HAAT	Transmitter coordinates
CJDC-TV-1	Fort St. John	9 (VHF)	0.180 kW	NA	56°16′45.12″N 121°2′38.40″W
CJDC-TV-2	Bullhead Mountain	8 (VHF)	0.009 kW	NA	56°2′41″N 122°7′59″W

CJDC-TV was previously repeated on CBC-owned rebroadcasters in Fort St. John, Pouce Coupe and Chetwynd. Due to budget cuts handed down on the CBC in April 2012, the CBC announced several austerity measures to keep the corporation solvent and in operation; this included the closure of the CBC and Radio-Canada's remaining analogue transmitters, including all CBC-owned transmitters rebroadcasting private stations on July 31, 2012.

On April 23, 2015, CJDC-TV's transmitter in Hudson's Hope, CJDC-TV-1 (channel 11), was destroyed in a fire. Bell Media subsequently applied on May 5 for permission to delete the transmitter, citing the fact that they had received no phone calls from viewers regarding the loss of the station (since they receive it locally on cable and DTH satellite television service). Bell further justified this by saying it would cost at least $35,000 to replace the destroyed nine-watt transmitter, and it brought in no revenue of its own to the station.

On October 4, 2017, Bell Media applied for a new transmitter in Fort St. John to repeat CJDC-TV. The application was approved on December 12, 2017. The transmitter, which broadcasts on channel 9, is a reactivation of a former CBC-owned transmitter, CBCD-TV-3, though using the then-available call-sign of CJDC-TV-1, which was vacated following the cancellation of the Hudson's Hope transmitter.

=== Former transmitters ===
Station	City of licence	Channel	ERP	HAAT	Transmitter coordinates
CJDC-TV-1	Hudson's Hope	11 (VHF)	0.009 kW	NA	56°1′42″N 121°56′38″W
