= TV Pětka =

- Country: Czech Republic

Programming
- Language(s): Czech

Ownership
- Owner: Metropol TV

History
- Launched: 15 October 2012
- Closed: 5 February 2013

TV Pětka (literally "TV 5") was a Czech television channel that focused primarily on Czech entertainment. It was known among Czech viewers mainly for a show about Iveta Bartošová and the problems with financing that started a month after the launch. Financial problems eventually led to the station going off the air after only three months.

== Original programming ==
TV Pětka relied on the fact that almost 100% of their programs was their own creation. It included:

- Bulvárek
- Buřtcajk
- City koktejl
- Co nového na Pětce
- Filmové novinky
- Indian
- Iveta
- Koule
- Maminka
- Miluji Česko
- Na vrcholu
- Na zdraví
- Nevař z vody
- Nic není nemožné
- Rozhovory na konci světa
- S-hitparáda
- Sbal si mě!
- Sen za den
- Sezóna
- Stylife
- Supermáma
- Svět celebrit
- Svět nás baví
- Šoumeni
- Toulky autobusem
- V luftě s Jakubem Kohákem
- Vaše oči
- Volejte k věci (formerly Volejte prezidentovi)
- Zprávy z Pětky
