= Telesol =

Telesol (Canal 5)
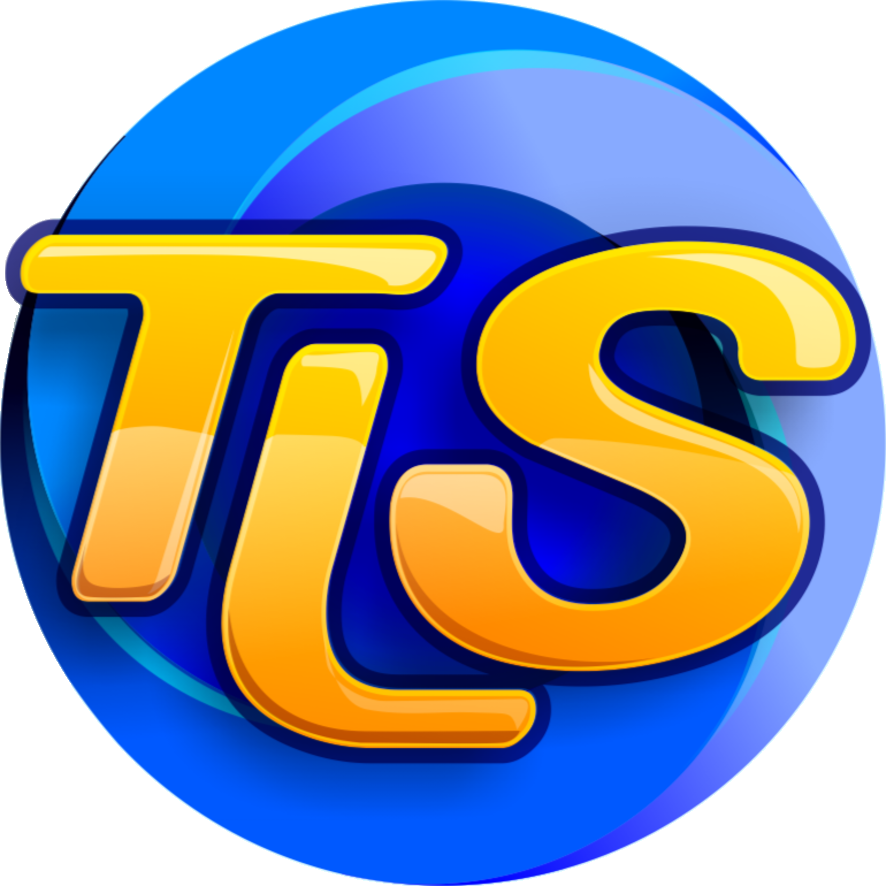
- San Juan; Argentina
- City: San Juan
- Channels: Analog: 5 (VHF); Digital: 36 (UHF)

Programming
- Affiliations: El Nueve

Ownership
- Owner: Andina S.A.

History
- First air date: 10 December 1996
- Former affiliations: Telefe (until 2026)

Technical information
- Licensing authority: ENACOM
- Repeater: See list

Links
- Website: telesoldiario.com

Canal 5 San Luis, known under its commercial name Telesol Canal 5, is an Argentine television station licensed to San Juan, Argentina, owned by Andina SRL. The station carries El Nueve programs.

== History ==
Telesol started broadcasting on December 10, 1996, under the control of Gastón Gioja. The station moved to new facilities at Calle Santa Fe in 2004, a building that the station would leave on January 10, 2025.

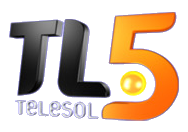
Logo used between 2009 and 2015.

On August 19, 2015, Telesol started broadcasting in HD; digital terrestrial broadcasts began on channel 36.1 in May 2022.

On December 19, 2024, Alberto Pérez, the owner of the Santa Fe Street facilities died, causing a status of uncertainty at the station. This prompted the station to initiate a move to new facilities, while making a decision about the old premises. The channel moved to its current facilities, sharing with AM 1020 and Diario El Zonda, upon the switch off of the former building, but the move was not formalized until March 12. The studio is the most technologically advanced in San Juan and in the Culo region.

On February 2, 2026, the station joined El Nueve after Telefe's new owners decided to withdraw commercial agreements with television stations in the Argentine inland.

== Programming ==
In addition to El Nueve relays, the station airs Telesol Noticias (news, 13:00 and 20:00), Amanecidos (morning magazine), De sobremesa (general interest) and La ventana (nightly program) among other local programs.
