= TV5 (Acre) =

- Rio Branco, Acre; Brazil
- Channels: Digital: 32 (UHF); Virtual: 5

Programming
- Affiliations: Rede Bandeirantes

Ownership
- Owner: Ecoacre Comunicações; (Sociedade de Comunicação Norte Ltda.)

History
- Founded: 1996
- First air date: April 15, 1996
- Former channel numbers: Analog: 5 (VHF, 1996–2018)
- Former affiliations: Rede Record (1996–2001); RedeTV! (2001–2002)

Technical information
- Licensing authority: ANATEL
- ERP: 2,4 kW
- Transmitter coordinates: 09°56′18.5″S 67°48′49.7″W

Links
- Public license information: Profile
- Website: www.ecoacre.news

TV5 (channel 5) is a Brazilian television station based in Rio Branco, capital of the state of Acre that is affiliated to Rede Bandeirantes. It is owned by locally based Ecoacre Comunicações.

== History ==
TV5 went on air on VHF channel 5 on April 15, 1996, assuming the position of an affiliate of Rede Record, which at that time was in the process of forming a network. The station became a new option as a TV channel in Rio Branco and the region, whose purpose was to create a different style of television. Throughout this period, it contributed significantly to local television journalism, consolidating itself as an important alternative for viewers in the region.

In 2001, after five years as an affiliate of Record, the broadcaster's contract was not renewed, when the network decided not to renew and sign with TV Gazeta, which at the time was a RedeTV! affiliate. With this, the station became an affiliate of RedeTV!. That same year, businessman Pedro Neves took over the station.

In 2002, just over a year after broadcasting RedeTV!, the broadcaster switched networks again, this time broadcasting Rede Bandeirantes. RedeTV! started to be broadcast on TV Quinari. According to Pedro Neves, in an interview with the Acrean website Página 20:

“Band, a network with great journalistic credibility, came to us when we were still affiliated to RedeTV!. When I received this invitation, I looked for the directors of RedeTV! to have a conversation, they accepted this change without any problems, however, we only joined Band when RedeTV! partners with Canal 40. We couldn't help but remember the partnership with Band, which has greatly contributed to our growth, and not forget the other networks we've already partnered with, Rede Record and RedeTV!.”

The businessman assured that the adaptations made by the station after its affiliation with Band were very good.

“The audience has been satisfactory, the number of advertisers increased every day, our programming has improved considerably and we now have three local programs a day.”

On December 6, 2004, the news program TV 5 Notícias premiered at 4:30 pm, presented by Demóstenes Nascimento. From February 2005, with the end of summer time in the southern region of the country, the program had its schedule adjusted, starting to be broadcast at 5 pm. The program was even shown at night.

In 2006, in celebration of ten years on air, the broadcaster promoted a big party, with the presence of the band Furacão do Calipso, a success throughout the country. Several local bands participated in the vast program of activities organized by the station. The event took place on April 29, at 8 pm, at Atlético Clube Juventus.

On June 24, 2008, there was a change in the Brazilian time zone in Acre and the extreme west and southwest of Amazonas, which left the state with just 1 hour less in relation to Brasília time. With this change, local program schedules were changed. On November 10, 2013, this difference returned to two hours (three in summer time).

== Technical information ==
| Virtual channel | Digital channel | Screen | Content |
|---|---|---|---|
| 5.1 | 32 UHF | 1080i | TV5/Band's main schedule |
| 5.2 | 32 UHF | 480i Widescreen | Educa5 |

Based on the federal decree transitioning Brazilian TV stations from analogue to digital signals, TV5, as well as the other stations in Rio Branco, ceased broadcasting on VHF channel 5 on October 31, 2018, following the official ANATEL timeline, and was Created Educa5, it was on Channel 5.2.

== Programming ==
In addition to retransmitting national programming from Rede Bandeirantes, TV5 produces and broadcasts the following programs:

- Café com Notícias: newscast, with Washington Aquino
- Sports Stand: sports debate, with Deise Leite, comments by Gelton Lima, Chico Pontes and Marcelo Avelino
- Acre Urgente: newscast, with Ercimairo Carvalho
- Sintonia EcoAcre: variety program with simultaneous transmission between Rádio Eco Acre FM and TV5, with Washington Aquino

== Controversies ==
On the morning of August 10, 2010, during a live interview on the morning news program in Cidade 5, the candidate for the Senate for Acre, João Correia (PMDB), was irritated by the questions asked to journalist Demóstenes Nascimento, about the involvement (when he was a federal deputy between 2003 and 2007) in the Leeches Scandal in 2006.

Candidate Correia got angry with the questions, exchanged insults, swear words and attacked the journalist. When exchanges of insults began that resulted in a fight between them, the program was interrupted with commercials. At this point in the commercials, the two exchanged punches and kicks for almost a minute in the interview studio.

After the fight was broken up by staff from the station, Demóstenes Nascimento returned to the air live. He explained to viewers about the interruption of the press conference: "Unfortunately we cannot show the interview because the candidate João Correia lowered his level. The aggression was moral, physical, and it was not just me, but all the journalists".

However, 45-second images leaked onto the internet were broadcast on all television news programs in Brazil, showing that the candidate started the fight, wanting to attack, exchange insults and even swear words (which were censored). The networks reported that those involved registered a police report (in the 8th Police District of Rio Branco) and were taken to the Legal Medical Institute (IML) to undergo a forensic examination.

After the images appeared on national news programs, the Union of Professional Journalists of Acre (Sinjac) and the National Federation of Journalists (Fenaj) issued a statement of repudiation in solidarity with Torres and against Correia.

On August 11, the station's management stated that it will take measures to ensure that the incident does not go unpunished.

On August 12, Correia and some members of the PMDB from Acre held a press conference and the surprise was that the candidate appeared with his right arm in a sling, one of his fingers with a bandage and on his face the marks still in red from punches and blows. which he received from Nascimento, saying he felt pain and stated that the journalist attended the interview to attack him. Correia says that the fight shown on television news was edited. He accused the journalist “in the service of the State government” and having guided the editing of part of the tape broadcast on national television. The edition only took parts that compromise him, making it clear that he started the verbal attacks and started the physical fight. In addition to attacking the current State Government, he also accused Sinjac of having “suffered fraud” by issuing a note in favor of the journalist.

The State government's Communications advisor, journalist Tainá Pires, released a statement denying all of Correia's accusations, saying that the Acre government had nothing to do with the interview that sparked a fight and not even with the accusation that was edited. of the images published on television news and websites: “TV 5 is a private company and, therefore, the government of Acre has nothing to do with its administrative decisions”.

The management of the TV station informed that Correia and the PMDB's "Liberty and Producing to Employ" coalition will have no difficulty in obtaining the raw tape, they will simply issue a letter to the Regional Electoral Court of Acre (TRE-AC) requesting a copy, if there is given that the original tape was delivered to that court the day after the incident occurred. As for broadcasting the images, the station reported that this possibility is being studied.

On August 15, the judge of the Regional Electoral Court of Acre (TRE-AC), Denise Bonfim, asked the broadcaster to send the images of the fight, claiming that she only had access to the edited images, which could compromise the evaluation of the fight. to decide who is responsible for the investigation. The judge gave the deadline for the recordings to be delivered by 11am on August 14.

On August 23, TRE-AC had access to the uncut video, including the coalition that supports Correia and the press, now almost 4 minutes long, demonstrating that the candidate actually started the fight. There was an announcement that the candidate would use the video of the fight in election advertising on TV.

Contrary to the news of the fight between the candidate and the journalist, the network news programs did not publicize the case further. Despite the new images, Correia claims that the content has been altered and goes to court to request an expert opinion on the images.

On September 8, the TRE-AC unanimously decided that night that the candidate João Correia (PMDB) has the right to grant a new interview to TV 5. The decision was made by the TRE Plenary.

On September 10, after being defeated by TRE-AC for the exhibition and examination of the images, Correia began a hunger strike in front of the Rio Branco Palace, sheltered by a tent set up under a temperature of 37 degrees. On the table, medication packets for hypertension, toothbrush and toothpaste, as well as copies of the two books Human, All Too Human (by Friedrich Nietzsche) and The Origins of Totalitarianism (by Hannah Arendt). On September 16, judge Romário Divino, from the Electoral Court, requested a technical examination of the interview footage. The hunger strike ended on September 17, when the candidate was informed by the lawyer who hired him.
