= Channel 5 virtual TV stations in Canada =

The following television stations operate on virtual channel 5 in Canada:

- CBLT-DT in Toronto, Ontario
- CBXT-DT in Edmonton, Alberta
- CHAU-DT in Carleton, Quebec
- CHAU-DT-2 in Saint-Quentin, New Brunswick
- CHKL-DT in Kelowna, British Columbia
- CIMT-DT-5 in Saint-Urbain, Quebec
- CJCH-DT in Halifax, Nova Scotia
- CKAL-DT in Calgary, Alberta
- CKRT-DT-4 in Cabano, Quebec
- CKRT-DT-6 in Trois-Pistoles, Quebec
