= Canal 5 TV-CE =

Defunct Guatemalan television channel

- Country: Guatemala

Ownership
- Owner: Ministry of Defence

History
- Launched: 1 August 1979
- Closed: 29 February 2000

Availability

Terrestrial
- Analog VHF: Channel 5

Canal 5 TV-CE (Cultural y Educativo) was a state-run television channel operational in Guatemala from 1979 to 2000. The station was set up by the Ministry of Defence and started broadcasting on 1 August 1979 though it conducted a test broadcast on 30 June 1979, to carry the Army Day parade. The channel's coverage area included the capital region's valley, part of the south coast and eastern and western Guatemala. Its programming was given to impulse education among Guatemalans. In-house programming included the weekly hour-long program Juguemos a aprender and music video showcase Dimensión 5. However, the station was plagued by a constant lack of funding, which was reflected in the lack of quality of its productions.

After over a decade relying mostly on carriage of live public events, it opened up its programming to include telenovelas in 1990, producing Esmeralda and Al filo de la Ciudad, both created to aim its audience on the topic of family planning, as well as the US evangelical program The 700 Club and military acts. In 1996, after the peace agreement between the guerilla factions and the state, it was proposed that the channel would fall under the control of the civil society. This was followed by the cession to the Ministry of Education in 1998, however it was plagued by further financial issues and outdated equipment. The channel closed on 29 February 2000, and the frequency was left vacant until 2004, when TV Maya, owned by the Mayan Language Academy, gained a state license and started broadcasting in April 2008.
