= Monarch Cablesystems =

Canadian television and internet service provider

Monarch Cablesystems' former logo

Monarch Cablesystems' former alternate logo

Monarch Cablesystems, LTD. was a cable television and internet service provider in British Columbia and portions of Alberta in Western Canada, and also operates Monarch TV-10, a community channel on Cable 10. Monarch was founded in the 1960s, and had expanded throughout Northern and Eastern British Columbia, with portions of service extending into southern Alberta as well. In 1976, Monarch had expanded into broadcasting by purchasing CBC Television affiliate CKRD-TV in Red Deer, Alberta under its newly created Monarch Broadcasting division. The station would later be sold to Allarcom in 1989. Monarch Broadcasting would later purchase Prince George, British Columbia's CKPG-TV in 1990 from Q Broadcasting, Ltd. The station, along with the entire Monarch Broadcasting division would be sold to Jim Pattison Broadcasting group, a division of the Jim Pattison Group on December 21, 2000. On October 1, 2007, Monarch was sold to Prince Rupert, British Columbia's CityTel and merged into its CityWest system, with its southern and Alberta portions of service being sold to Shaw Communications.

== See also ==
- CityWest
