= CKDV-FM =

Radio station in Prince George, British Columbia

Coordinates: 53°54′11″N 122°42′10″W

- Prince George, British Columbia; Canada
- Frequency: 99.3 MHz
- Branding: 99.3 Rewind Radio

Programming
- Format: Classic hits
- Affiliations: Prince George Spruce Kings

Ownership
- Owner: Jim Pattison Group
- Sister stations: CKKN-FM; CKPG-TV

History
- First air date: February 8, 1946
- Former call signs: CKPG (1946–2003)
- Former frequencies: 1230 kHz (1946–1947); 550 kHz (1947–2003)
- Call sign meaning: "Drive", former branding

Technical information
- Licensing authority: CRTC
- Class: B
- ERP: 9,300 watts horizontal polarization only
- HAAT: 89.6 meters

Links
- Webcast: Listen live
- Website: 993rewindradio.ca

CKDV-FM (99.3 MHz) is a radio station in Prince George, British Columbia, Canada. Owned by Jim Pattison Group, the station plays a classic hits format.

== History ==
The station was originally launched on February 8, 1946 as CKPG 1230 AM, and moved to 550 the following year. The station, owned by CKPG Radio Ltd., was an affiliate of the CBC's Trans-Canada Network. In 1961, CKPG Radio also launched the city's first television station, CKPG-TV. The stations were acquired by Q Broadcasting in 1969.

In 1981, a sister FM station, CIOI, was launched. The three stations were sold to Monarch Broadcasting in 1990, and then to the Jim Pattison Group in 2000. Pattison converted CKPG to its current call sign, frequency and format in 2003.

Also in 2003, CKDV-FM added a rebroadcaster at Mackenzie on 1240 AM. The transmitter in Mackenzie was formerly a separate radio station, CKMK. Its license as a separate station was revoked when it became a rebroadcaster of CKDV-FM, although the transmitter still uses the CKMK call sign.

By March 7, 2011 at 6:00 a.m., the station flipped to classic hits from classic rock (the format that debuted on the station after the station converted to FM), leaving mainstream rock station CIRX-FM as Prince George's only rock station again. Although classic hits songs are generally also played by adult contemporary and adult hits stations, this brings gold-based pop back to Prince George when CKKN-FM flipped to hot adult contemporary as The River from its old Hits FM adult contemporary format. In September 2021, CKDV-FM rebranded to 99.3 Rewind Radio retaining the classic hits format.
