= Prince George Free Press =

Local newspaper in Prince George, British Columbia, Canada (1994-2015)

The Free Press
- Format: tabloid
- Owner(s): Black Press; Aberdeen Publishing
- Launched: 1994
- Ceased publication: May 1, 2015
- Language: English
- City: Prince George
- Country: Canada
- Website: www.pgfreepress.com

The Prince George Free Press was a local weekly newspaper published in Prince George, British Columbia, Canada from 1994 to 2015. The Free Press was the first journalism employer for Michelle Lang who later died in 2009 while reporting from Afghanistan.

The Free Press began publishing on November 3, 1994 on a weekly basis but within months added a second edition per week. It reverted to a single publication per week in 2014. After two decades, the Free Press ceased publishing in mid-2015. The original owner was Black Press. The final owner (purchased in 2010) was Aberdeen Publishing, a collection of independent community newspapers in British Columbia and Alberta. The founding editor was Shane Mills (future editor of The Now (newspaper) in Surrey and public-relations director for Premier Christy Clark) and the final editor was Bill Phillips (winner of the 2007 Best Columnist award at the British Columbia/Yukon Community Newspaper Association Ma Murray award).

The Free Press competed against the daily Prince George Citizen. Several Free Press staff were hired by The Citizen. Nine were working at The Citizen before the closure of the Free Press.

== See also ==
- List of newspapers in Canada
