= FETV (Panama) =

Television network in Panama

FETV Canal 5
- Broadcast area: Panama

Programming
- Picture format: 1080i HDTV (downscaled to 480i for the SD feed)

Ownership
- Owner: Fundación para la Educación en la Television

History
- Launched: April 1, 1992
- Replaced: Panavisión

Links
- Website: www.fetv.org

Availability

Terrestrial
- Analog VHF: Channel 5
- Digital UHF: Channel 48

FETV is a television network that broadcasts on channel 5 in Panama City, and is headquartered in Panama City, Panama, with repeaters throughout the country. The network and stations broadcast in the NTSC format. The network takes its name from the Television Education Foundation (FETV), its owner.

== History ==
In 1990, the Catholic Church of Panama sought to create an educational television station in the country, and with the leadership of other churches and the commercial broadcasters, the Television Education Foundation (Fundación para la Educación en la Television) was formed.

The next year, the station received its frequencies to operate, and it bought the equipment used to operate FETV's predecessor on channel 5, Panavisión/Telecinco, in bankruptcy from Cofina, a governmental financial entity which had taken the channel 5 facilities as collateral for debts that Telecinco owed to the government.

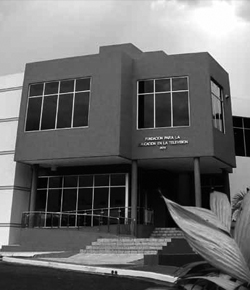
FETV's studio facilities in Panama City.

After broadcasting test signals, FETV signed on April 1, 1992; the station went to air with 4 hours of programming a day.

The station's programming is largely educational and social in nature. In 2009 they signed a 3-way deal, with the nation's major commercial broadcasters: TVN and Telemetro (MEDCOM), to avoid a sale of the station to international broadcasters. As a result, TVN moved into FETV's headquarters, and FETV moved to a smaller headquarters building next to their now former headquarters. FETV was the first station to cover Darien Province.

Programming includes children's shows, nature documentaries, medical and family topics talk shows, and programs from a variety of international broadcasters, such as Rome Reports, the Discovery Channel and National Geographic.

The channel was famous for Sarnoso, a brown dog which was a character of a kids' show called Cool Zone and was the mascot of the channel. However the channel gradually shifted away its programming into a religious channel when it changed its slogan and logo in 2016.

== Slogans ==
- El Canal de la misericordia (2016-)
- El Canal de lo Bueno(2014-2016)
- Totalmente bueno (2014-2016)
- La Buena Television (2010-2013)
- Abriendo Horizontes (1992-2011)
