= CJCI-FM =

Radio station in Prince George, British Columbia

Coordinates: 53°54′10″N 122°42′12″W

- Prince George, British Columbia; Canada
- Frequency: 97.3 MHz
- Branding: Country 97

Programming
- Format: Country

Ownership
- Owner: Vista Broadcast Group; (Vista Radio)
- Sister stations: CIRX-FM

History
- First air date: 1970
- Call sign meaning: Central Interior

Technical information
- Class: B
- ERP: 12 kWs horizontal polarization only
- HAAT: 63.8 metres (209 ft)

Links
- Website: myprincegeorgenow.com/country-97-fm

CJCI-FM is a Canadian radio station broadcasting at 97.3 FM in Prince George, British Columbia, owned by Vista Radio. The station currently airs a country format using its on-air brand name as Country 97.

The station was launched in 1970 by Central Interior Radio, broadcasting on 620 AM. In 1983, Central Interior also launched CIBC-FM in the city.

The station moved to its current frequency in 2002, and Central Interior Radio was acquired by the Vista Broadcast Group in 2005.
