= Hemispheres (TV program) =

Hemispheres is a news and current affairs program, co-produced by the Australian Broadcasting Corporation (ABC) and the Canadian Broadcasting Corporation (CBC). Its main focus was foreign events and international issues, using ABC and CBC correspondents from around the world. The program debuted in 2005.

It aired on the Australia Network and CBC Newsworld channels, as well as on ABC2 in Australia, but not on the main free-to-air ABC and CBC channels.

It was presented by CBC News anchor Ian Hanomansing from Vancouver, and ABC News presenter Felicity Davey in Sydney.

== See also ==
- List of Australian television series
- List of English-language Canadian television series
