= Enjoy TV5 =

- Country: Malaysia
- Broadcast area: Malaysia; Singapore; Brunei; Thailand (South Thailand, particularly Songkhla, Narathiwat, Yala and Satun); Indonesia (West Kalimantan, North Kalimantan and Riau Islands); Philippines (particularly southern Palawan and Tawi-Tawi)

Programming
- Languages: Malay; English; Chinese
- Picture format: 16:9 1080i HDTV (downscaled to 16:9 576i for the SDTV feed)

Ownership
- Owner: Enjoy TV Broadcasting Sdn Bhd

History
- Launched: 15 July 2023; 3 years ago (test broadcasts); 10 May 2025; 15 months ago (official)
- Closed: 15 October 2023; 2 years ago (test broadcasts); 20 August 2026; 19 days ago

Availability

Terrestrial
- MYTV: Channel 105 (SD)

Enjoy TV5 was a private television channel owned by Enjoy TV Holdings. Enjoy TV5 only broadcast English movies (Hollywood and United Kingdom), local movies (Malaysia and Singapore), Hong Kong movies and China movies. Other than that, Enjoy TV5 also broadcast other television programme such as variety shows, Chinese TV dramas, English TV dramas, entertainment shows, and news briefs. It started its trial broadcast on May 10, 2025, and broadcast 24 hours a day.

== History ==
Ahead of regular broadcasts, the channel acquired a raft of Taiwanese titles in November 2022, which would occupy 50% of the schedule, as well as some TVB productions.

Test broadcasts were conducted starting 15 July 2023 on MYTV's streaming platform.

The channel was announced on 5 May 2025. Broadcasts started on 10 May. The channel was given a one-year incentive period, with a three-year broadcasting license, pending MCMC regulations.

The channel was closed on 20 August 2026 for unknown reasons. It had suspended its broadcasts since 1 August 2026 for technical upgrades, but it failed to secure an upgrade.
