= CKPG-TV =

Television station in Prince George, British Columbia

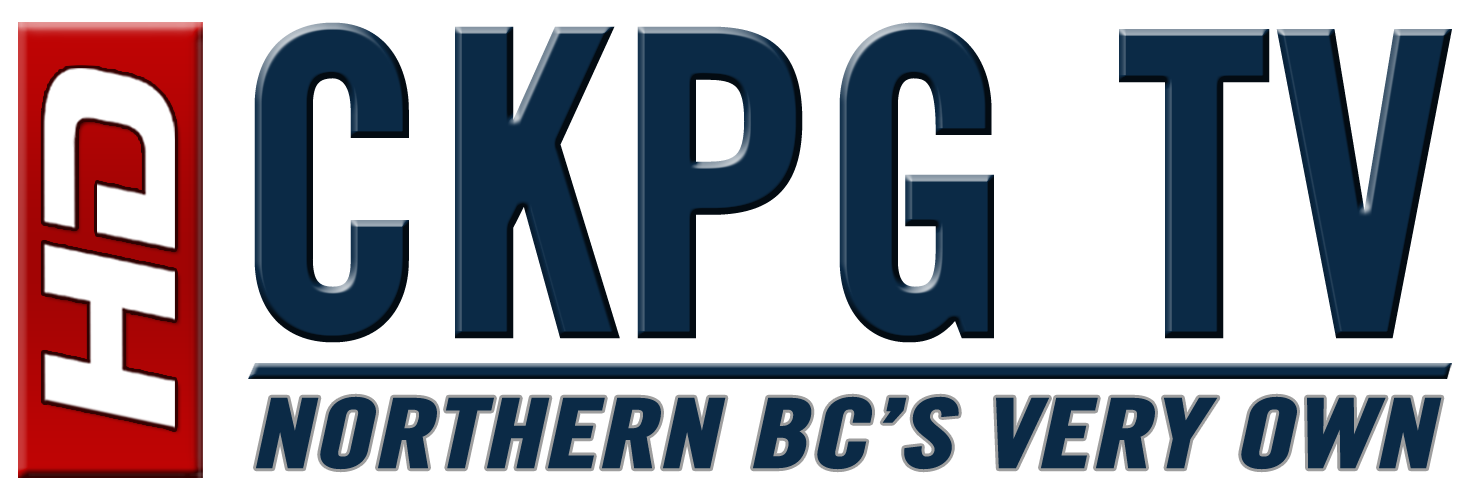
- Prince George, British Columbia; Canada
- Channels: Analog: 2 (VHF); Digital: allocated 34 (UHF)
- Branding: CKPG TV

Programming
- Affiliations: Citytv (2009–present)

Ownership
- Owner: Jim Pattison Group; (Pattison Media Limited Partnership)
- Sister stations: CKKN-FM; CKDV-FM

History
- First air date: August 20, 1961
- Former affiliations: CBC (1961–2008); E! (2008–2009)
- Call sign meaning: CK Prince George

Technical information
- Licensing authority: CRTC
- ERP: 8.3 kW
- HAAT: 329.7 m (1,082 ft)
- Transmitter coordinates: 54°2′47″N 122°53′37″W
- Translator(s): See below

Links
- Website: CKPG Today

CKPG-TV (analog channel 2) is a television station in Prince George, British Columbia, Canada, affiliated with Citytv. The station is owned by Pattison Media, and maintains studios on 3rd Avenue (near Winnipeg Street) in Prince George; its transmitter is located atop Pilot Mountain.

CKPG also operates rebroadcasters in Hixon (CKPG-TV-1, channel 10), Mackenzie (CKPG-TV-4, channel 6), and Quesnel (CKPG-TV-5, channel 13).

== History ==
The station first signed on the air on August 20, 1961, originally operated as a CBC affiliate. It was founded by the owner of local radio station CKPG (1230 AM, now CKDV-FM on 99.3 FM), broadcasting at a transmitter power output of 8,300 watts. The station's president and general manager, Bob Harkins, was one of the first people to appear on-air. In 1965, the station signed on a rebroadcaster in Quesnel on VHF channel 13. In April 1969, both the radio and television stations were purchased by Vancouver-based Q Broadcasting Ltd., owners of CHQM in Vancouver.

On December 12, 1970, Brian "Spinner" Spencer, a rookie hockey player for the Toronto Maple Leafs from Fort St. James, was called up to play with the Leafs in what would be his first NHL game on television. He called back home to his father, Roy Spencer, to tell him to watch the game that night on Hockey Night in Canada. Spencer was to be interviewed between periods during the game. However, CKPG-TV instead aired a game between the Vancouver Canucks and the California Golden Seals in place of the Maple Leafs-Chicago Black Hawks matchup. Infuriated, Roy Spencer drove 135 kilometres (84 mi) to CKPG-TV's Prince George studios and ordered the technicians at gunpoint to broadcast the Maple Leafs game instead. The station complied, but as Roy Spencer left the station, he was confronted by RCMP officers. After a brief stand-off, Roy Spencer was shot and killed. The event was later depicted in the 1993 Atom Egoyan-directed made-for-TV movie Gross Misconduct.

In 1973, Gord Leighton was appointed general manager of CKPG-TV and CKPG radio. By 1985, the station had operated six rebroadcasting stations, including three that were owned by the CBC, operating in Hixon, Mackenzie, Quesnel, Vanderhoof, Fort Fraser and Fort St. James. On November 2, 1986, Harkins was awarded the Jeanne Clarke Memorial Local History Award for his contributions to local history and the community. He also served two terms as an alderman, and was involved with the station's operations until he accepted a position at rival radio station CJCI (97.3 FM). Harkins would return to CKPG-TV in the early 1990s, being seen regularly on the programme Community Close-up, on news segments Harkins Comment and Harkins History, and on a station-produced video, Portraits: Bob Harkins.

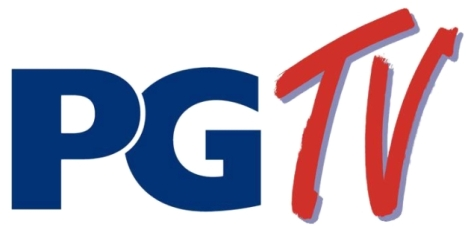
Logo used during its "PGTV" branding.

In 1988, the Canadian Radio-television and Telecommunications Commission (CRTC) renewed the network licence for CKPG-TV and Terrace station CFTK-TV, which allowed the two CBC affiliates to use the corporation's microwave equipment to transfer syndicated programming, when it was not being used for transmitting CBC programs. In 1990, Q Broadcasting Ltd. sold Radio Station CKPG Ltd., and its CKPG Television Ltd. subsidiary, to Monarch Broadcasting. Harkins died at the age of 69 on November 28, 2000. Nearly one month later, on December 21, the CRTC approved the buyout of Monarch Broadcasting by Pattison Media (then known as the Jim Pattison Broadcast Group), a division of the Jim Pattison Group, which included CKPG-TV and its re-transmitter stations.

In 2001, CKPG-TV and its sister radio stations were a part of the 24-hour Relay for a Friend, held on May 5 and 6 of that year. This event raised $260,000 for cancer research and services. In July 2002, Ken Kilcullen was appointed general manager of CKPG-TV, along with its sister stations CKKN-FM and CKDV-FM. In the fall of 2003, the station was added to Bell ExpressVu's basic tier; competing satellite provider Star Choice later began carrying the station in February 2004. In May 2004, CKPG-TV received the Special Program of the Year award from the BC Association of Broadcasters for its special Crossing the Line, which looked at softwood lumber. On August 27 that year, the CRTC renewed CKPG-TV's licence, recognizing the station's commitment to local news (it carried over ten hours of local programming per week) and extended its CBC affiliation through August 31, 2008. In September 2004, the operations of CKPG-TV and its sister radio stations moved into new studio facilities at 1810 3rd Avenue.

CKPG's logo used from 2008 to 2012 and is the basis of the current logo.

When CBC Television went to a 24-hour schedule in October 2006, CKPG-TV increased the amount of CBC programming in its schedule. Along with the increase in overall hours of programming, the station increased its local programming to over 12 hours a week, including additions of its daily news and information programming.

In September 2007, CKPG announced plans to disaffiliate from the CBC after its affiliation term ended on August 31, 2008. Documents filed with the CRTC indicate the station would begin receiving programming from Canwest. As Global station CHAN already broadcasts over-the-air in Prince George (via a rebroadcast transmitter), CKPG became an E! affiliate, as did Kamloops station CFJC. It was announced that CKPG's re-transmitters would not be replaced by the CBC; following the switch to E!, CBC's Vancouver station CBUT became the market's default affiliate through its availability on cable and satellite in Prince George (CBUT's existing rebroadcasters would later shut down in 2012, as part of austerity measures imposed by the network).

It was later announced that the rebroadcast transmitters of another former CBC affiliate that switched to E!, CHAT-TV in Medicine Hat, Alberta, would not be replaced by the CBC. All three areas became served by other television networks, including the E! system. However, despite the light Francophone population in the absence of an Anglophone network, Radio-Canada station CBUFT out of Vancouver is still available over-the-air in Prince George and Kamloops, and CBUFT's Edmonton sister station CBXFT is still available in Medicine Hat.

CKPG News logo starting on September 1, 2008.

On July 14, 2009, the Jim Pattison Group announced that CKPG and its other E! stations would affiliate with Rogers Media's Citytv system starting September 1; despite this, the stations did not incorporate any form of "Citytv" branding. CKPG and CFJC would also become part of a new regional sales initiative known as "inTV". Canwest had previously announced it would either sell or close its E! stations, leaving the Pattison stations without a programming source. On May 3, 2012, Rogers announced the renewal of the Citytv affiliation agreement with Jim Pattison Group, originally slated to expire that August. Beginning September 1, 2012, CKPG began carrying 90% of Citytv's prime time schedule and the majority of its morning and daytime lineup in pattern with Vancouver's CKVU-DT (including a simulcast of the Vancouver edition of Breakfast Television), opting out for local midday and evening newscasts.

Historically, CKPG aired Hockey Night in Canada dated back to the days of CBC affiliation. However, when Rogers bought the national rights to the NHL in November 2013, the Pattison affiliates began to air Hockey Night once again in October 2014.

== News operation ==
CKPG-TV presently broadcasts 15 hours of locally produced newscasts each week (with three hours each weekday); the station does not produce any newscasts on weekends. CKPG-TV's local newscasts are titled CKPG News; the station carries a 30-minute lunch hour newscast at noon, an hour-long early evening newscast from 5 to 6 p.m. and again from 6 to 7 p.m. along with a 30-minute newscast at 11 p.m. on weekdays only. Recorded versions of the 11 p.m. newscast are re-aired during overnight hours, until 7 a.m. the following morning. The station also produces CKPG News Week in Review, a half-hour recap of the week's top local news stories that airs on Saturdays at Noon and 6 p.m., with repeat broadcasts at noon and 6 p.m. on Sunday along with Monday mornings at 6 a.m.

== Transmitters ==
Station	City of licence	Channel	ERP	HAAT	Transmitter coordinates
CKPG-TV-1	Hixon	10 (VHF)	0.009 kW	NA	53°28′43″N 122°38′5″W
CKPG-TV-4	Mackenzie	6 (VHF)	0.008 kW	NA	55°1′52″N 122°53′44″W
CKPG-TV-5	Quesnel	13 (VHF)	0.008 kW	NA	52°53′0″N 122°20′10″W

CKPG-TV's programming was originally repeated on CBC-owned transmitters in Vanderhoof (CBCB-TV-1, channel 18), Fort Fraser (CBCB-TV-2, channel 13) and Fort St. James (CBCB-TV-3, channel 7); these transmitters switched to CBUT following CKPG-TV's disaffiliation from the CBC.

== Digital television and high definition ==
As of September 2008, CKPG has not yet begun broadcasting a digital signal. According to a 2009 CRTC decision, CKPG-TV is not required to switch to digital, as Prince George is not a mandatory market for digital conversion, which took place in most other markets on August 31, 2011. When CKPG-DT signs on its digital signal, it will broadcast on UHF channel 34, using virtual channel 2.
