= CBC Television =

Canadian television network

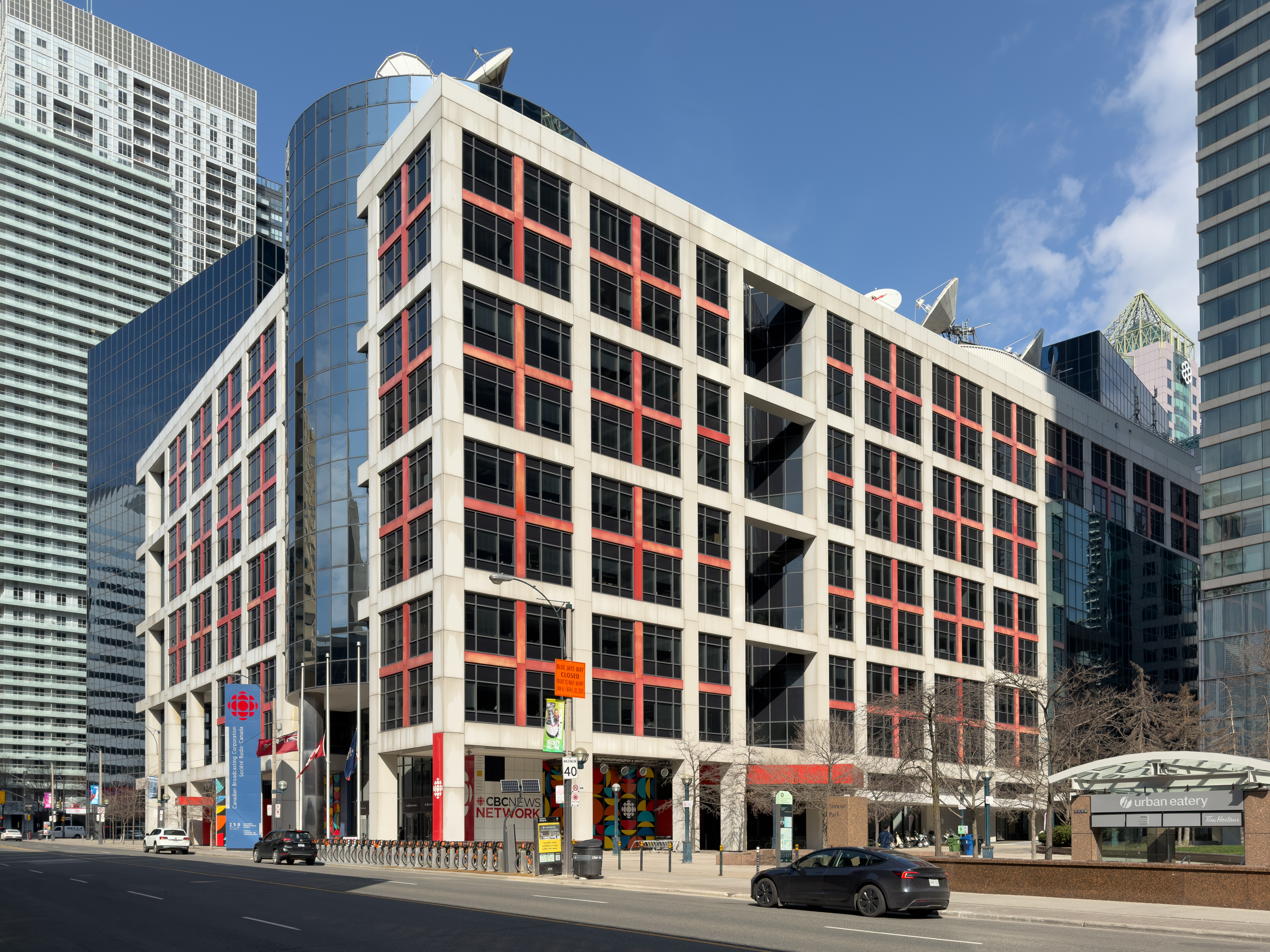
- CBC Television Headquarters in Toronto, 2025
- Type: Broadcast television network
- Country: Canada
- Broadcast area: Canada, reaching bordering regions via overspill of the Canadian terrestrial network
- Affiliates: List of member stations
- Headquarters: Canadian Broadcasting Centre, Toronto, Ontario, Canada

Programming
- Language: English
- Picture format: HDTV 720p

Ownership
- Owner: Canadian Broadcasting Corporation
- Key people: Barbara Williams, executive vice president, CBC English-language services

History
- Launched: September 6, 1952; 74 years ago

Links
- Website: www.cbc.ca/television/

Availability

Streaming media
- CBC Gem: Over-the-top TV
- RiverTV: Over-the-top TV
- Amazon Prime Video: Over-the-top TV

CBC Television (also known as CBC TV, or simply CBC) is a Canadian English-language broadcast television network owned by the Canadian Broadcasting Corporation, the national public broadcaster. The network began operations on September 6, 1952, with its main studios at the Canadian Broadcasting Centre in Toronto. Its French-language counterpart is Ici Radio-Canada Télé.

CBC Television is available throughout Canada on over-the-air television stations in urban centres, and as a must-carry station on cable and satellite television providers, and live streamed on its CBC Gem video platform. The channel is also used to distribute children's programming nationally.

== Overview ==
This alternate logo was used by CBC Television for print ads and program promos from the 1960s until 1974. A version of this logo was also used for CBC Radio (with "Radio" replacing "Television"). However, this was never used as an official logo for CBC Television.

Used from December 9, 1974 to December 31, 1985

Used from January 1, 1986 to November 1992

Used from November 1992 to present

CBC Television provides a complete 24-hour network schedule of news, sports, entertainment, and children's programming; in most cases, it feeds the same programming at the exact local times nationwide, except to the Newfoundland Time Zone, where programs air 30 minutes "late".

On October 9, 2006, at 6:00 a.m., the network switched to a 24-hour schedule, becoming one of the last major English-language broadcasters to transition to such a schedule. Most CBC-owned stations previously signed off the air during the early morning (typically from 1:00 a.m. to 6:00 a.m.).

Instead of the infomercials aired by most private stations, or a simulcast of CBC News Network in the style of BBC One's nightly simulcast of BBC News Channel, the CBC uses the time to air repeats, including local news, primetime series, films and other programming from the CBC library.

Its French counterpart, ICI Radio-Canada Télé, which continued to sign off every night for some years, now broadcasts a simulcast of its sister news network Ici RDI after regular programming ends for the night until the next programming day begins.

While historically there has been room for regional differences in the schedule, as there is today (see "Stations", below), for CBC-owned stations, funding has decreased to the point that most of these stations no longer broadcast any significant local programming beyond local newscasts and an edition of the summer regional documentary series Absolutely Canadian.

Until 1998, the network carried a variety of American programs in addition to its core Canadian programming, directly competing with private Canadian broadcasters such as CTV, Citytv and Global. Since then, it has restricted itself to Canadian programs, a handful of British programs, and a few American films and off-network repeats. Since this change, the CBC has sometimes struggled to maintain ratings comparable to those it achieved before 1995, although it has seen somewhat of a ratings resurgence in recent years. In the 2007–08 season, popular series such as Little Mosque on the Prairie and The Border helped the network achieve its strongest ratings performance in over half a decade.

Logo used by CBC Television from 2001 to 2009. Previous variants of the logo retained the CBC logo, but the text was in a different font.

In 2002, CBC Television and CBC News Network became the first broadcasters in Canada that are required to provide closed captioning for all of their programming. On those networks, only outside commercials need not be captioned, though most of them are aired with captions. All shows, bumpers, billboards, promos and other internal programming must be captioned. The requirement stems from a human rights complaint filed by deaf lawyer Henry Vlug, which was settled in 2002.

== History ==
In 1950, CBC was granted channels 2 and 5 in Montréal and 9 in Toronto. The stations were initially expected to sign on in 1951.

== Programming ==
=== News and current affairs ===
The CBC's flagship newscast, The National, airs Sunday through Fridays at 10:00 p.m. local time (except in Newfoundland, where it airs at 10:30 p.m.) and Saturdays at 6:00 p.m. EST. Until October 2006, CBC owned-and-operated stations aired a second broadcast of the program at 11:00 p.m.; This later broadcast included only the main news portion of the program, and excluded the analysis and documentary segment. This second airing was later replaced with other programming, and as of the 2012-13 television season, was replaced on CBC's major market stations by a half-hour late newscast. There is also a short news update, at most, on late Saturday evenings. During hockey season, this update is usually found during the first intermission of the second game of the doubleheader on Hockey Night in Canada.

The show also simultaneously broadcasts rolling coverage from CBC News Network from noon to 1 p.m. local time in most time zones (also from 6 to 7 a.m. in regions where a local CBC Radio One morning show is not simulcast instead).

In addition to the mentioned late local newscasts, CBC stations in most markets fill early evenings with local news programs, generally from 5:00 p.m. to 6:30 p.m., while most stations also air a single local newscast on weekend evenings (comprising a supper hour broadcast on Saturdays and a late evening newscast on Sundays). Weekly newsmagazine The Fifth Estate is also a CBC mainstay, as are documentary series such as Doc Zone.

=== Sports ===
One of the most popular shows on CBC Television is the weekly Saturday night broadcast of NHL hockey games, Hockey Night in Canada. It has been televised by the network since 1952. During the NHL lock-out and subsequent cancellation of the 2004–05 hockey season, the CBC instead aired various recent and classic films, branded as Movie Night in Canada, on Saturday nights. Many cultural groups criticized this and suggested the CBC air games from minor hockey leagues; the CBC responded that most such broadcast rights were already held by other groups, but it did base each Movie Night broadcast from a different Canadian hockey venue. Other than hockey, CBC Sports properties included Toronto Raptors basketball, Toronto FC soccer, and various other amateur and professional events.

The telecast of the Olympics including the Summer and Winter Olympic Games on Canadian television on CBC's broadcast started in 1956. It has the rights to broadcast the Olympic Games until 2032.

It was also the exclusive carrier of Canadian Curling Association events during the 2004–05 season. Due to disappointing results and fan outrage over many draws being carried on CBC Country Canada (now called Cottage Life), the association tried to cancel its multiyear deal with the CBC signed in 2004. After the CBC threatened legal action, both sides eventually came to an agreement under which early-round rights reverted to TSN. On June 15, 2006, the CCA announced that TSN would obtain exclusive rights to curling broadcasts in Canada as of the 2008–09 season, shutting the CBC out of the championship weekend for the first time in 40-plus years.

CBC Sports suffered another major blow when it was announced that after the 2007 season, the CFL regular season games and the Grey Cup would be moving to TSN, ending the CBC's tenure with the CFL. It has been stated that the CFL was not happy with the CBC's lacklustre production during the CBC's 2005 union lock-out, which forced the network to use CBC management to work the behind-the-scenes telecast and use stadium public address announcers in place of their regular announcer crew.

On June 23, 2007, the network aired the first game in a two-year deal to broadcast Toronto Blue Jays games; the contract ended at the end of the 2008 season, and was not renewed.

In August 2007, it was also announced that the CBC would broadcast National Basketball Association games involving the Toronto Raptors, starting with the 2007–08 NBA season, through at least 2009–10; the CBC would carry 10 games for the 2007–08 and 20 games for the 2008–09 and 2009–10 seasons.

In November 2013, the CBC lost its rights to the NHL to Rogers Communications, under a 12-year deal beginning in the 2014–15 NHL season. The CBC concurrently announced a sub-licensing agreement with Rogers, under which it would supply Sportsnet-produced Hockey Night in Canada broadcasts to CBC Television at no charge; all advertising during the broadcasts would be sold by Rogers, but the CBC would be provided with advertising time for its own programs. Officially, the broadcasts are carried by a CRTC-licensed part-time network operated by Rogers and affiliated with all CBC Television stations. This was required to formally assign responsibility for the broadcasts to Rogers; on-air, the telecasts otherwise use CBC branding and continuity.

As a result of funding reductions from the federal government and decreased revenues, in April 2014, the CBC announced it would no longer bid for professional sport broadcasting rights.

=== Entertainment ===
Among CBC Television's best-known primetime series are comedy series Rick Mercer Report (2004–18), This Hour Has 22 Minutes (since 1993) and Little Mosque on the Prairie (2007–12), and dramas such as The Tudors (2007–10), Heartland (since 2007) and Intelligence (2006–07). In recent years, British series such as Coronation Street and Doctor Who have been given greater prominence. As noted above, it now carries very little American programming apart from some syndicated daytime shows.

In 2006, the CBC announced radical changes to its primetime line-up, including the following new series to premiere that fall:

- Dragons' Den (reality)
- Intelligence (drama; 2006–07)
- Rumours (comedy; 2006–07)
- Underdogs (a spinoff of Marketplace)
- Jozi-H (medical drama; a Canadian-South African co-production; 2006–07)
- The One: Making a Music Star (a Canadian version of the American reality show simulcast by CBC in July 2006; Canadian series was not included on the schedule)
- 72 Hours: True Crime (crime documentary series; aired in "core" of primetime for first time; 2004–07)
- Repeats of The Hour on the main CBC network, from 2005 to 2014.

Many were surprised by these changes to the CBC schedule, which were apparently intended to attract a younger audience to the network; some suggested they might alienate the core CBC viewership. Another note of criticism was made when the network decided to move The National in some time zones to simulcast the American version of The One over the summer. This later became a moot point, as The One was taken off the air after two weeks after extremely low American and Canadian ratings, and the newscast resumed its regular schedule.

In 2006, daytime programming was also revamped. While there were still repeats of CBC and foreign series, new talk shows such as The Gill Deacon Show (2006–07) and the regional franchise Living (2007–09) were aired. The Gill Deacon Show was cancelled after just seven months, and replaced with another talk show, Steven and Chris from 2008 to 2015 (Steven and Chris is also shown on the Live Well Network in the United States); Living was cancelled in August 2009.

On January 9, 2007, the CBC began airing a highly publicized new series called Little Mosque on the Prairie (2007–12), a comedy about a Muslim family living in rural Saskatchewan. The series garnered strong ratings as well as international media attention, for most of its five-year run. It was also announced that Martha Stewart's daytime show would be added to the CBC daytime line-up, with the nighttime Wheel of Fortune and Jeopardy! following in September 2008 (with a few edits to limit the amount of U.S. advertising).

In January 2008, CBC Television launched the drama series The Border (2008–10), MVP (2008) and jPod (2008), the reality series The Week The Women Went (2008–09) and the comedy Sophie from 2008 to 2009. Only The Border and Sophie were renewed for a second season in the fall of 2008. The new series Being Erica (2009–10) and the short-lived Wild Roses (2009) began airing in January 2009.

Beginning in 2005, the CBC has contributed production funds for the BBC Wales revival of Doctor Who, for which it received a special credit at the end of each episode. This arrangement continued until the end of fourth season, broadcast in 2008. The CBC similarly contributed to the first season of the spin-off series, Torchwood. More recently, the network has also begun picking up Canadian rights to some Australian series, including the drama series Janet King and Love Child, and the comedy-drama series Please Like Me.

In 2015, CBC Television premiered Dan and Eugene Levy's sitcom Schitt's Creek; the series began to achieve critical acclaim after it was acquired by the streaming service Netflix, and swept all seven comedy awards at the 72nd Primetime Emmy Awards—becoming the first comedy or drama to sweep all seven major awards in their respective genre at the ceremony.

==== CBC Gem ====
CBC Gem logo

CBC Gem is CBC Television's over-the-top streaming platform; it launched in 2018, replacing the existing CBC TV app. The service carries live and on-demand programming from CBC Television, CBC News, and CBC Sports, as well as short- and long-form original programming and acquisitions (including films and television series).

The service is available in free ad-supported and premium versions, with the latter including advertising-free video on-demand, access to CBC News Network, and access to premium content that is exclusive to subscribers.

At launch, the CBC announced plans to add at least 50 Canadian films to Gem per-year, and announced a partnership with Telefilm Canada to stream a selection of featured Canadian films on the service ad-free for all users.

In May 2026, the CBC announced that it would launch a new digital brand known as CBC Docs to replace the Documentary Channel, along with a $7 million commitment to new documentary content.

=== Children's programming ===
Children's programming, often marketed as "CBC Kids" and "The Outlet", occupies most of the morning on weekdays and much of weekend mornings.

== CBC HD ==

On March 5, 2005, CBC Television launched a high definition simulcast of its Toronto (CBLT-DT) and Montreal (CBMT-DT) stations. Since that time, the network has also launched HD simulcasts in Vancouver (CBUT-DT), Ottawa (CBOT-DT), Edmonton (CBXT-DT), Calgary (CBRT-DT), Halifax (CBHT-DT), Windsor, (CBET-DT), Winnipeg (CBWT-DT), and St. John's (CBNT-DT).

City	Station	OTA digital channel (virtual channel)	Digital OTA launch date
Calgary, Alberta	CBRT-DT	21 (9.1)	April 1, 2011
Charlottetown, Prince Edward Island	CBCT-DT	13 (13.1)	August 31, 2011
Edmonton, Alberta	CBXT-DT	42 (5.1)	April 1, 2011
Fredericton, New Brunswick	CBAT-DT	31 (4.1)	August 31, 2011
Halifax, Nova Scotia	CBHT-DT	39 (3.1)	August 31, 2011
Montreal, Quebec	CBMT-DT	20 (6.1)	February 21, 2005
Ottawa, Ontario	CBOT-DT	25 (4.1)	September 13, 2006
Regina, Saskatchewan	CBKT-DT	9 (9.1)	August 31, 2011
St. John's, Newfoundland and Labrador	CBNT-DT	8 (8.1)	August 31, 2011
Toronto, Ontario	CBLT-DT	20 (5.1)	March 5, 2005
Vancouver, British Columbia	CBUT-DT	43 (2.1)	January 9, 2006
Windsor, Ontario	CBET-DT	9 (9.1)	August 31, 2011
Winnipeg, Manitoba	CBWT-DT	27 (6.1)	December 9, 2011
Yellowknife, Northwest Territories	CFYK-DT	8 (8.1)	August 1, 2012

All HD channels map to their analogue positions via the North American PSIP virtual channeling standard.

In fall 2007, the CBC upgraded its Toronto facilities, becoming the second fully HD news broadcaster in Canada. The National and all its news programs originating from the same news studio in Toronto (including CBC News: Sunday Night) are now available in HD.

On September 1, 2011, as part of the analogue television shutoff and digital conversion, all CBC over-the-air HD broadcasts switched from the 1080i to 720p resolution format.

In August 2012, after the CBC shut down all of their remaining analogue transmitters, CBC television (as well as CBC News Network) began broadcasting all programming solely in the 16:9 aspect ratio and began letterboxing its widescreen feed for standard definition viewers just as Ici Radio-Canada Télé has done since September 2007.

== Stations ==
All CBC television stations, including those in major cities, are owned and operated by the CBC itself, with their master control facilities all located at the Canadian Broadcasting Centre in Toronto. CBC owned-and-operated (O&O) stations operate as a mostly seamless national service with few deviations from the main network schedule, although there are some regional differences from time to time. For on-air identification, most CBC stations use the CBC brand rather than their call letters, not identifying themselves specifically until sign-on or sign-off (though some, like Toronto's CBLT, do not ID themselves at all except through PSIP). All CBC O&O stations have a standard call letter naming convention, in that the first two letters are "CB" (an ITU prefix in the CA-CE block allocated not to Canada (whose block is CF-CK), but to Chile) and the last letter is "T". Only the third letter varies from market to market; however, that letter is typically the same as the third letter of the CBC Radio One and CBC Radio 2 stations in the same market. An exception to this rule are the CBC North stations in Yellowknife, Whitehorse and Iqaluit, whose call signs begin with "CF" due to their historic association with the CBC's Frontier Coverage Package prior to the advent of microwave and satellite broadcasting.

Some stations that broadcast from smaller cities were private affiliates of the CBC, that is, stations which are owned by commercial broadcasters but predominantly incorporated CBC programming within their schedules. Such stations generally followed the CBC schedule, airing a minimum 40 hours per week of network programming. However, they often chose to opt out of some CBC programming in order to air locally produced programs, syndicated series or programs purchased from other broadcasters, such as CTV Two, which do not have a broadcast outlet in the same market. In these cases, the CBC programming being displaced may have been broadcast at a different time than the network, or were not broadcast on the station at all. Most private affiliates generally opted out of CBC's afternoon schedule and Thursday night arts programming. Private affiliates carried the 10 p.m. broadcast of The National as a core part of the CBC schedule, but generally omitted the 11 p.m. repeat (which is no longer broadcast). Most private affiliates produce their own local newscasts for a duration of at least 35 minutes.

Following the disaffiliation of the last privately owned CBC affiliate CKSA-DT in Lloydminster on August 31, 2016, no more private stations operate as CBC affiliates, as many such stations have been purchased either by the CBC itself or by Canwest Global or CHUM Limited, respectively becoming E! (a small system owned by Canwest, but separate from its fully national Global Television Network) or A-Channel (later A, now CTV Two) stations. One private CBC affiliate, CHBC-TV in Kelowna, joined E! (then known as CH) on February 27, 2006. When a private CBC affiliate reaffiliated with another network, the CBC normally added a retransmitter of its nearest O&O station to ensure that CBC service is continued. However, due to an agreement between CHBC and CFJC-TV in Kamloops, CFJC also disaffiliated from the CBC on February 27, 2006, but no retransmitters were installed in the licence area. Former private CBC affiliates CKPG-TV Prince George and CHAT-TV Medicine Hat disaffiliated on August 31, 2008, and joined E!, but the CBC announced it would not add new retransmitters to these areas. Incidentally, CFJC, CKPG and CHAT are all owned by an independent media company, Jim Pattison Group. With the closure of E! and other changes in the media landscape, several former CBC affiliates subsequently joined CTV, Citytv or Global, or closed altogether.

According to filings to the Canadian Radio-television and Telecommunications Commission (CRTC) by Thunder Bay Electronics (owner of CBC's Thunder Bay affiliate CKPR-DT) and Bell Media (owner of CBC affiliates CFTK-TV in Terrace and CJDC-TV in Dawson Creek), the CBC informed them that it would not extend its association with any of its private affiliates beyond August 31, 2011. Incidentally, that was also the date for analogue to digital transition in Canada. Given recent practice and the CBC's decision not to convert any retransmitters to digital, even in markets with populations in the hundreds in thousands, it was not expected that the CBC would open new transmitters to replace its affiliates, and indeed pared back its existing transmitter network to just its digital transmitters in July 2012. However, in March 2011, CKPR announced that it had come to a programming agreement with the CBC, in which the station would continue to provide CBC programming in Thunder Bay for a period of five years.

On March 16, 2012, Astral Media announced the sale of its assets to Bell Media, owners of CTV and CTV Two, for $3.38 billion with CFTK and CJDC included in the acquisition. Both stations subsequently became CTV Two stations.

CBC television stations in Nunavut, the Northwest Territories and Yukon, branded as CBC North, tailor their programming mostly to the local native population, and broadcast in many native languages such as Inuktitut, Gwichʼin and Dene.

== CBC Television worldwide ==
=== Carriage of CBC News ===
From 1994 through July 2005, CBC Television's news programming was aired in the United States on Newsworld International.

On September 11, 2001, several American broadcasters without their own news operations, including C-SPAN and Home Shopping Network, carried the CBC's coverage of the terror attacks in New York City and Washington, D.C. In the days after September 11, C-SPAN carried CBC's nightly newscast, The National, anchored by Peter Mansbridge.

C-SPAN has also carried CBC's coverage of major events affecting Canadians. Among them:

- Canadian federal elections.
- Six days in September 2000 that marked the death and state funeral of Pierre Elliott Trudeau.
- The war in Iraq. The National aired on C-SPAN each night for about three weeks following the attacks on Iraq.
  - Peter Mansbridge signed off his broadcasts during that time, saying "I'm Peter Mansbridge. Thanks for watching, those of you here in Canada, and viewers across the United States watching us on C-SPAN."
- The power outage crisis in summer 2003.
- Key proceedings in Parliament of Canada, such as state openings.
- U.S. presidential elections.
  - In 2004, C-SPAN picked up The National the day after the election for the view from Canadians.
- State and official visits of American presidents to Canada.
  - During MSNBC's coverage of President George W. Bush's visit to Canada, the CBC's senior parliamentary editor, Don Newman, appeared on MSNBC.

Several PBS stations also air some CBC programs, especially The Red Green Show, although no CBC programming currently airs on the full network schedule.

For a number of years CBC co-produced a news programme, Hemispheres, with Australia's national broadcaster, the ABC; the program was hosted from Sydney and Vancouver and included reports from both networks' foreign correspondents. It was broadcast in both Canada and Australia and across Asia and the Pacific on the Australia Network.

=== Canada–United States border audiences ===
CBC Television stations can be received over-the-air or through cable in many American communities along the Canada–United States border, and have a significant audience in those areas.

CBC's sports coverage has also attained high viewership in border markets, including its coverage of the NHL's Stanley Cup Playoffs. Its coverage of the Olympic Games also found a significant audience in border regions, primarily due to the fact that CBC aired more events live than NBC's coverage, which had been criticized in recent years for tape delaying events to air in primetime, even if the event is being held in a market in the Pacific Time Zone during primetime on the East (where it would still be delayed for West Coast primetime).

== Over-the-air digital television transition ==
The CRTC ordered that in 28 "mandatory markets," full power over-the-air analogue television transmitters had to cease transmitting by August 31, 2011. Broadcasters could either continue serving those markets by transitioning analogue transmitters to digital or cease broadcasting over-the-air. Cable, IPTV, and satellite services are not involved or affected by this digital transition deadline.

While its fellow Canadian broadcasters converted most of their transmitters to digital by the Canadian digital television transition deadline of August 31, 2011, the CBC converted only about half of the analogue transmitters in mandatory areas to digital (15 of 28 markets with CBC Television stations, and 14 of 28 markets with Télévision de Radio-Canada stations). Due to financial difficulties reported by the corporation, the corporation published digital transition plans for none of its analogue retransmitters in mandatory markets to be converted to digital by the deadline. Under this plan, communities that receive analogue signals by rebroadcast transmitters in mandatory markets would lose their over-the-air signals as of the deadline. Rebroadcast transmitters account for 23 of the 48 CBC and Radio-Canada transmitters in mandatory markets. Mandatory markets losing both CBC and Radio-Canada over-the-air signals include London, Ontario (metropolitan area population 457,000) and Saskatoon, Saskatchewan (metro area population 257,000). In both of those markets, the corporation's television transmitters are the only ones that were not planned to be converted to digital by the deadline.

Because rebroadcast transmitters were not planned to be converted to digital, many markets stood to lose over-the-air coverage from CBC or Radio-Canada, or both. As a result, only seven of the markets subject to the August 31, 2011, transition deadline were planned to have both CBC and Radio-Canada in digital, and 13 other markets were planned to have either CBC or Radio-Canada in digital. In mid-August 2011, the CRTC granted the CBC an extension, until August 31, 2012, to continue operating its analogue transmitters in markets subject to the August 31, 2011, transition deadline. This CRTC decision prevented many markets subject to the transition deadline from losing signals for the CBC or Radio-Canada, or both at the transition deadline. At the transition deadline, Barrie, Ontario lost both CBC and Radio-Canada signals as the CBC did not request that the CRTC allow these transmitters to continue operating.

In markets where a digital transmitter was installed, existing coverage areas were not necessarily maintained. For instance, the CBC implemented a digital transmitter covering Fredericton, New Brunswick in the place of the existing transmitter covering Saint John, New Brunswick and Fredericton, and decided to maintain analogue service to Saint John. According to CBC's application for this transmitter to the CRTC, the population served by the digital transmitter would be 113,930 people versus 303,465 served by the existing analogue transmitter. In Victoria, the replacement of the Vancouver analogue transmitters with digital ones only allowed only some northeastern parts of the metropolitan area (total population 330,000) to receive either CBC or Radio-Canada.

CBC announced on April 4, 2012, that it will shut down all of its approximately 620 analogue television transmitters on July 31, 2012 with no plans to install digital transmitters in their place, thus reducing the total number of the corporation's television transmitters across the country down to 27. According to the CBC, this would reduce the corporation's yearly costs by $10 million. No plans have been announced to use subchannels to maintain over-the-air signals for both CBC and Radio-Canada in markets where the corporation has one digital transmitter. In fact, in its CRTC application to shut down all of its analogue television transmitters, the CBC communicated its opposition to use of subchannels, citing costs, amongst other reasons.

The CBC had stated that the "useful life of CBC/Radio-Canada's satellite distribution backbone for analogue transmission ends in 2013" and that it "will not reinvest in that infrastructure given the inevitability of analogue obsolescence."

Despite the shutdown of the rebroadcasters, few viewers actually lost access to CBC programming due to the very high penetration of cable and satellite, which is all but essential for acceptable television in much of Canada (particularly rural areas).

=== CBC and affiliate transmitters in mandatory markets ===
		CBC Television (English language)		Ici Radio-Canada Télé (French language)	
Province	Market	Analog	Digital	Analog	Digital
AB	Calgary	Yes	Yes	Yes	No
AB	Edmonton	Yes	Yes	Yes	Yes
AB	Lethbridge	Yes	No	Yes	No
AB / SK	Lloydminster	Yes (affiliate)	2011-2016: Yes (affiliate); Since 2016: No^{1}	No^{1}	No^{1}
BC	Vancouver	Yes	Yes	Yes	Yes
BC	Victoria	Yes (Vancouver transmitter)	Sidney/Saanich only (Vancouver transmitter)	Sidney/Saanich only (Vancouver transmitter)	Sidney/Saanich only (Vancouver transmitter)
MB	Winnipeg	Yes	Yes	Yes	Yes
NB	Fredericton	Yes (Saint John transmitter)	Yes	Yes	No
NB	Moncton	Yes	No	Yes	Yes
NB	Saint John	Yes	No	Yes	No
NL	St. John's	Yes	Yes	Yes	No
NS	Halifax	Yes	Yes	Yes	No
ON	Kitchener	Yes	No	Yes	No
ON	London	Yes	No	Yes	No
ON	Ottawa/Gatineau, QC	Yes	Yes	Yes	Yes
ON	Thunder Bay	Yes (affiliate)	2011-2014: Yes (affiliate); Since 2014: No^{2}	Yes	No
ON	Toronto	Yes^{3}	Yes^{3}	Yes	Yes
ON	Windsor	Yes	Yes	Yes	No
PE	Charlottetown	Yes	Yes	Yes	No
QC	Montreal	Yes	Yes	Yes	Yes
QC	Quebec City	Yes	No	Yes	Yes
QC	Rivière-du-Loup	No^{4}	No^{4}	Yes (affiliate)	2011 to 2021: Yes (affiliate); Since 2021: No^{4}
QC	Rouyn-Noranda/Val-d'Or	Yes (Kearns, ON and Malartic, QC transmitters)	No	Yes (affiliate)	2011 to 2018: Yes (affiliate); Since 2018: No^{5}
QC	Saguenay	Yes	No	Yes	Yes
QC	Sherbrooke	Yes	No	Yes	Yes
QC	Trois-Rivières	Yes	No	Yes	Yes
SK	Regina	Yes	Yes	Yes	Yes
SK	Saskatoon	Yes	No	Yes	No
Total	27 markets	26 yes, 1 no	14 yes, 12 no, 1 partially	26 yes, 1 no	13 yes, 13 no, 1 partially

In addition to the above noted digital transmitters, the non-mandatory market Radio-Canada transmitter in Rimouski, Quebec, CJBR-DT, was transitioned to digital on August 31, 2012. The non-mandatory market CBC Yellowknife transmitter, CFYK-DT, was transitioned to digital on July 31, 2012. Of the non-mandatory affiliates, CKWS-DT Kingston and CHEX-DT Peterborough, Ontario converted in 2013, while CFTK-TV Terrace and CJDC-TV Dawson Creek, British Columbia has yet to convert; these stations has since changed its affiliations to other networks.

^{1} Lloydminster's CBC affiliate, CKSA-DT, disaffiliated with the network in September 2016, changing to an affiliate of Global. CBXT Edmonton and/or CBKT Regina now serves the region via cable and satellite. Radio-Canada never had a transmitter serving the Lloydminster area.

^{2} Thunder Bay's CBC affiliate, CKPR-DT, disaffiliated with the network in September 2014, changing to an affiliate of CTV. CBLT now serves the city via cable and satellite.

^{3} The Greater Toronto Area was served by CBC Television flagship CBLT, while the Durham Region was served by an affiliate, CHEX-TV-2. CHEX-TV-2 would not be required to convert to digital until 2019. CHEX-TV-2 would drop CBC programming in exchange for CTV in 2015; it since became a Global outlet for the Durham Region in 2018.

^{4} The Radio-Canada affiliate serving Rivière-du-Loup, CKRT-DT, ceased operations on August 31, 2021, after Radio-Canada declined to renew CKRT's affiliation, with no sufficient alternate sources available. Radio-Canada programming has since become available in the region only by cable and satellite, with CJBR-TV Rimouski seen on many cable systems. CBC Television never had a transmitter serving the Rivière-du-Loup area.

^{5} The Radio-Canada affiliate serving Rouyn-Noranda/Val-d'Or, CKRN-DT, ceased operations on March 25, 2018. Radio-Canada programming has since become available in the region only by cable and satellite, with CBFT Montreal seen on many cable systems. CBC Television was provided by two different repeaters: CBVD-TV channel 5 Malartic (repeating CBMT Montreal, serving Val-d'Or) and CFCL-TV-2 / CBLT-8 channel 2 in Kearns, Ontario (repeating CFCL-TV Timmins, later CBLT Toronto, serving Rouyn-Noranda); these repeaters would close with the rest of the repeater network in 2012.

=== History ===
In 2006, the CBC submitted a plan to the CRTC for transitioning the over-the-air television signals from analogue to digital. In this submission, the CBC stated that its 654 analogue transmitters reached 98% of the population, and that it planned on installing 44 digital transmitters, reaching 80% of Canadians.

The CRTC decided to impose a mandatory transition date switching over-the-air television signals from analogue to digital, following consultation with CBC and the public. The CBC had requested during this consultation that broadcasters be given four years to transition. Following the consultation, on May 17, 2007, the CRTC imposed a transition timeline of four years, resulting in a transition deadline of August 31, 2011, and requiring that over-the-air analogue transmitters be shut off by that date.

On July 6, 2009, the CRTC limited the August 31, 2011 transition deadline to certain mandatory markets, greatly reducing the number of transmitters needing to be transitioned. In CBC's 2009–2010 Corporate Plan, the corporation stated that it planned on having 30 transmitters broadcasting in digital by the deadline, costing $30 million.

On August 6, 2010, the CBC issued a press release stating that due to financial reasons, the CBC and Radio-Canada would only transition 27 transmitters total, one in each market where there was an originating station (i.e. a CBC or Radio-Canada television station located in that market). Further, the CBC stated in the release, that only 15 of the transmitters would be in place by August 31, 2011, due to lack of available funds, and that the remainder would not be on the air until as late as August 31, 2012. Additionally, the CBC stated in the release that it was asking the CRTC for permission to continue broadcasting in analogue until the identified transmitters for transition were up and running. At the time of the press release, only eight of the corporation's transmitters (four CBC and four Radio Canada) were broadcasting in digital.

On November 30, 2010, the CBC's senior director of regulatory affairs issued a letter to the CRTC regarding CBC's plans for transitioning to digital. The letter states, "CBC/Radio-Canada will not be converting its analogue retransmitters in mandatory markets to digital after August 31, 2011." On December 16, 2010, some months after the CRTC issued a bulletin reminding broadcasters that analogue transmitters had to be shut off by the deadline in mandatory markets, the CBC revised the documents accompanying its August 6, 2010, news release to state that it had the money for and is striving to transition all 27 transmitters by August 31, 2011.

On March 23, 2011, the CRTC rejected an application by the CBC to install a digital transmitter serving Fredericton, New Brunswick in place of the analogue transmitter serving Fredericton and Saint John, New Brunswick, which would have served only 62.5% of the population served by the existing analogue transmitter. The CBC issued a press release stating "CBC/Radio-Canada intends to re-file its application with the CRTC to provide more detailed cost estimates that will allow the Commission to better understand the unfeasibility of replicating the Corporation's current analogue coverage." The press release further added that the CBC suggests coverage could be maintained if the CRTC were to "allow CBC Television to continue providing the analogue service it offers today – much in the same way the Commission permitted recently in the case of Yellowknife, Whitehorse and Iqaluit."

On March 29, 2011, the CRTC added the following condition of licence to over-the-air stations owned by CBC: "Unless otherwise authorized by the Commission, the licensee shall not transmit analogue television signals after 31 August 2011 in mandatory markets designated as such by the Commission in Broadcasting Regulatory Policy 2011-184 or transmit television signals on channels 52 to 69".

On August 18, 2011, the CRTC issued a decision that allows CBC's mandatory market rebroadcasting transmitters in analogue to remain on-air until August 31, 2012. Before that deadline, the CBC's licence renewal process would take place and CBC's digital transition plans would be examined as part of that process. The requirement remains for all of CBC's full-power transmitters occupying channels 52 to 69 to either relocate to channels 2 to 51 or become low-power transmitters. In some cases, the CBC has opted to reduce the power of existing transmitters to low-power transmitters, which will result in signal loss for some viewers.

On April 4, 2012, the CBC released its budget plans, in which it announced that all of its approximately 620 analogue television transmitters would be shut down on July 31, 2012, which was earlier than planned, due to funding reductions from the federal government.

On July 17, 2012, the CRTC approved the shut down of CBC's analogue transmitters, noting that "while the Commission has the discretion to refuse to revoke broadcasting licences, even on application from a licensee, it cannot direct the CBC or any other broadcaster to continue to operate its stations and transmitters." On July 31, 2012, at around 11:59 p.m. in each time zone, the remaining 620 analogue transmitters were shut down, leaving the network with 27 digital television transmitters across the country, and some transmitters operated by some affiliated stations.

== See also ==
- 1999 CBC strike
- List of CBC Television stations
- List of programs broadcast by CBC Television
- Ici Radio-Canada Télé
