= List of campus radio stations in Canada =

This is a list of campus radio stations in Canada. Most stations listed here are members of the National Campus and Community Radio Association, or NCRA.

CFRC in Kingston is the longest continuously broadcasting radio station on a Canadian campus, with its first broadcasts beginning in 1922.

CKUA was originally operated by the University of Alberta, which held the station's license from 1927 until 1974; however Alberta Government Telephones actually operated the station from 1945 until 1974 when ownership was transferred to another government agency, the Alberta Educational Communications Corporation.

CJRT in Toronto, the first FM radio station in Canadian history licensed to an educational institution, severed its association with Ryerson Polytechnical Institute in 1974 and became an independent public broadcasting station financed by the government of Ontario.

CKCU in Ottawa was Canada's first community-based campus radio station, broadcasting since November 15, 1975.

Note that this list may also include some stations which are or have historically been affiliated with colleges or universities, but are now licensed as community radio, rather than campus radio, stations. Such stations are marked with a † next to their call signs.

Call sign	Frequency	City of licence	Owner
== Alberta ==
CJSW-FM	90.9 FM	Calgary	University of Calgary
CJSR-FM	88.5 FM	Edmonton	University of Alberta
CKXU-FM	88.3 FM	Lethbridge	University of Lethbridge
== British Columbia ==
CIVL-FM	101.7 FM	Abbotsford	University of the Fraser Valley
CFML-FM	107.9 FM	Burnaby	British Columbia Institute of Technology
CJSF-FM	90.1 FM	Burnaby	Simon Fraser University
CFBX-FM	92.5 FM	Kamloops	Thompson Rivers University
CHLY-FM	101.7 FM	Nanaimo	Vancouver Island University
CFUR-FM	88.7 FM	Prince George	University of Northern British Columbia
CITR-FM	101.9 FM	Vancouver	University of British Columbia
CKMO	defunct	Victoria	Camosun College
CFUV-FM	101.9 FM	Victoria	University of Victoria
== Manitoba ==
CJJJ-FM	106.5 FM	Brandon	Assiniboine Community College
CKIC-FM	defunct	Winnipeg	Red River College
CJUM-FM	101.5 FM	Winnipeg	University of Manitoba
CKUW-FM	95.9 FM	Winnipeg	University of Winnipeg
== New Brunswick ==
CHSR-FM	97.9 FM	Fredericton	University of New Brunswick
CKUM-FM	93.5 FM	Moncton	Université de Moncton
CHMA-FM	106.9 FM	Sackville	Mount Allison University
CFMH-FM	107.3 FM	Saint John	University of New Brunswick - Saint John
== Newfoundland and Labrador ==
CHMR-FM	93.5 FM	St. John's	Memorial University of Newfoundland
== Nova Scotia ==
CFXU-FM	93.3 FM	Antigonish	St. Francis Xavier University
CKDU-FM	88.1 FM	Halifax	Dalhousie University
CJBU-FM	107.3 FM	Cape Breton Regional Municipality	Cape Breton University
== Ontario ==
CJLX-FM	91.3 FM	Belleville	Loyalist College
CFRU-FM	93.3 FM	Guelph	University of Guelph
CFMU-FM	93.3 FM	Hamilton	McMaster University
CIOI-FM	101.5 FM	Hamilton	Mohawk College
CJIQ-FM	88.3 FM	Kitchener	Conestoga College
CFRC-FM	101.9 FM	Kingston	Queen's University
CIXX-FM	106.9 FM	London	Fanshawe College
CHRW-FM	94.9 FM	London	University of Western Ontario
CKDJ-FM	107.9 FM	Ottawa	Algonquin College
CKC455	91.9 FM	Mississauga	University of Toronto (Mississauga)
CKCU-FM	93.1 FM	Ottawa	Carleton University
CHUO-FM	89.1 FM	Ottawa	University of Ottawa
CFFF-FM †	92.7 FM	Peterborough	Trent University
CFBU-FM	103.7 FM	St. Catharines	Brock University
CKLU-FM	96.7 FM	Sudbury	Laurentian University
CILU-FM	102.7 FM	Thunder Bay	Lakehead University
CJTM	1280 AM	Toronto	Toronto Metropolitan University
CKHC-FM	96.9 FM	Toronto	Humber College
CKLN-FM	defunct	Toronto	Ryerson University
CIUT-FM	89.5 FM	Toronto	University of Toronto (St. George)
CHRY-FM	105.5 FM	Toronto	York University
CKMS-FM †	102.7 FM	Waterloo	University of Waterloo
CRNC	90.1 FM (cable only)	Welland	Niagara College
CJAM-FM	99.1 FM	Windsor	University of Windsor
== Prince Edward Island ==
CIMN-FM	defunct	Charlottetown	University of Prince Edward Island
== Quebec ==
CJLO	1690 AM	Montreal	Concordia University
CKUT-FM	90.3 FM	Montreal	McGill University
CISM-FM	89.3 FM	Montreal	Université de Montréal
CHYZ-FM	94.3 FM	Quebec City	Université Laval
CJMQ-FM †	88.9 FM	Sherbrooke	Bishop's University
CFAK-FM	88.3 FM	Sherbrooke	Université de Sherbrooke
CFOU-FM	89.1 FM	Trois-Rivières	Université du Québec à Trois-Rivières
== Saskatchewan ==
CJOS-FM	defunct	Caronport	Briercrest Bible College
CJUS-FM	defunct	Saskatoon	University of Saskatchewan

== Internet ==
Name	Location	Owner
Hot Hits	Belleville, Ontario	Loyalist College
Revolution 103	Calgary, Alberta	SAIT Polytechnic
CMRU	Calgary, Alberta	Mount Royal University
Ignite Radio	Hamilton, Ontario	Mohawk College
Spartan Web Radio	Langley, British Columbia	Trinity Western University
The Falcon	London, Ontario	Fanshawe College
Stellar Radio	London, Ontario	Fanshawe College
CHOQ.ca	Montreal, Quebec	Université du Québec à Montréal
Radio Piranha	Montreal, Quebec	École de Technologie Supérieure
Riot Radio	Oshawa, Ontario	University of Ontario Institute of Technology; Durham College
AIR Algonquin	Ottawa, Ontario	Algonquin College
Lab Radio	Ottawa, Ontario	La Cité collégiale
CJUS	Saskatoon, Saskatchewan	University of Saskatchewan
Radio Glendon	Toronto, Ontario	Glendon College
S@Y Radio	Toronto, Ontario	Seneca College
Fusion Radio	Toronto, Ontario	University of Toronto (Scarborough)
Radio Laurier	Waterloo, Ontario	Wilfrid Laurier University
Red River Radio	Winnipeg, Manitoba	Red River College
Axe Radio	Wolfville, Nova Scotia	Acadia University

== Closed circuit ==
Name	Location	Owner
CSKY Radio	Montreal, Quebec	John Abbott College
CIXS The Edge	Montreal, Quebec	Dawson College
CFRL	London, Ontario	Fanshawe College
