= Terra Informa =

- Genre: Environmental News
- Running time: 29 minutes
- Country of origin: Canada
- Language(s): English
- Home station: CJSR
- Syndicates: CFBU, CFBX, CFIS, CHRY, CHSR, CICK, CILU, CJHQ, CJSF, CJUC, CKDU, CKLB, CKXU, UMFM
- Recording studio: Edmonton, Alberta
- Original release: 2003
- Website: http://terrainforma.ca
- Podcast: http://feeds.feedburner.com/TerraInforma

Terra Informa is a weekly, half-hour environmental news program produced out of CJSR Radio in Edmonton, Alberta. Currently airing in more than 50 communities from coast to coast, it is one of the most widely broadcast shows on Canadian campus and community radio.

The program covers environmentally themed news stories from across Canada with an emphasis on grassroots movements and under-reported stories. Billing itself as, "Your source for the news that the mainstream media missed," the show's reports frequently include interviews with directly affected communities and members of local First Nations, in addition to politicians, academics, and environmental groups.

== Background ==
Terra Informa was started by Paul Reikie and Tara Irwin and began broadcasting in 2003. It initially focused on news stories affecting Alberta, and in particular Edmonton. In 2009 the show was picked up by CFRU in Guelph and began shifting its coverage to include stories from across Canada. As of 2011, it is broadcast on 17 radio stations serving 59 communities. A complete list of broadcast locations is available on the show's website.

== Awards ==
Terra Informa won two awards from the National Campus and Community Radio Association in 2011. It was recognized for Outstanding Achievement - Current Affairs or Magazine Show and Outstanding Achievement - Documentary for its 2010 report on air pollution in the Peace River region of Alberta. It was the only program to take home multiple awards.

In 2012, Terra Informa won the National Campus and Community Radio Association award for Outstanding Achievement - News. In 2013 and 2015, Terra Informa took home awards for Outstanding Achievement - Syndicated Show or Podcast.
