= Community radio in Canada =

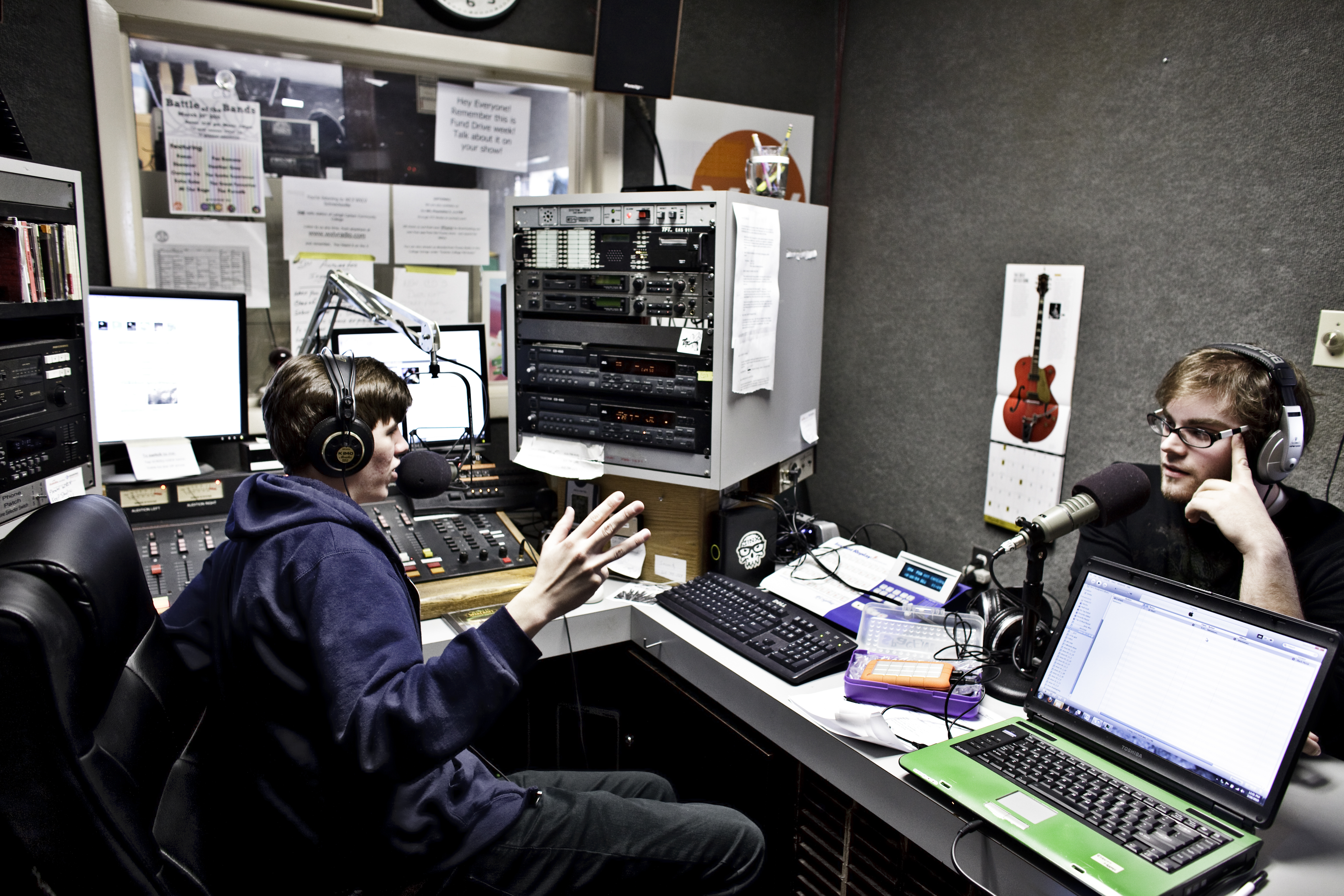
A community radio station on the air live

Community radio in Canada is a legally defined broadcasting category governed by the Canadian Radio-television and Telecommunications Commission (CRTC). It is distinct from the other two (often better known) categories, commercial broadcasting, and public broadcasting. Community radio can be considered a subcategory of alternative media. Community radio exists worldwide and is often broadly similar around the world, however, it can have variations in the government regulations that they are required to follow, the national or regional contexts in which its developed and the specific culture, goals or methods they adhere to.

Community stations broadcast content that is popular and relevant to a local, specific audience but is often overlooked by commercial or mass-media broadcasters. Community radio stations are operated, owned, and influenced by the communities they serve. They are generally nonprofit and provide a mechanism for enabling individuals, groups, and communities to tell their own stories, to share experiences and, in a media-rich world, to become creators and contributors of media.

== History ==
Community radio began in Canada in 1974/1975 with four stations: CFRO-FM Vancouver, CINQ-FM Montreal, CKCU Ottawa, and CKWR-FM Kitchener. In 1975, the Quebec provincial government began a financial aid program that helped to grow the presence of community radio in the province, and as a result, there are now 22 community radio stations in Quebec. These stations started a provincial organization in 1979 called l'Association des Radiodiffuseurs Communitaire du Quebec (ARCQ).

Community radio has had a significant presence in Native communities in the Canadian north, with over 60 community radio stations in Native communities in the Canadian north by 2016. A large part of the impetus for community radio in these communities was the challenge of keeping Native languages and cultures thriving. In 1973, the CBC began broadcasting southern Canadian and American television and radio into small northern communities, which many saw as a threat to the survival of their language and culture. Subsequently, many northern Native communities began their own community radio stations. This later accelerated with the implementation of the Northern Native Broadcast Access Program in 1983.

Throughout the 1980s community radio stations continued to grow, particularly on university campuses across Canada.

== Legal Status ==
=== Mandate ===
Community stations are subject to the Canadian Radio-television and Telecommunications Commission's (CRTC) Campus and Community Radio Policy. Though the policy itself recognizes campus radio and community radio to be distinct, they are similar enough to be governed by a single document. Most campus stations in Canada hold both a campus and a community radio license.

This policy states about community radio that it "distinguishes itself by virtue of its place in the communities served, a reflection of its needs and values, and the requirement for volunteers in programming and station operations. This helps ensure that programming is different from that of commercial and public radio, in both style and substance, and is rich in local information and reflection. The programming provided by campus and community radio should meet the needs and interests of the communities served by these stations in ways that are not met by commercial radio stations and the Canadian Broadcasting Corporation (CBC)."

In this policy, the CRTC requires community stations to

- facilitate community access to programming;
- promote the availability of training throughout the community; and
- provide for the ongoing training and supervision of those within the community wishing to participate in programming.

It also requires stations to offer diverse programming that reflects the needs and interests of the community, including:

- music by new and local talent;
- music not generally broadcast by commercial stations;
- spoken word programming; and
- local information.

=== Content Restrictions ===
==== General Canadian Content Restrictions ====
All broadcasters in Canada, including community radio, must follow strict regulations regarding the minimum amount of Canadian content they must broadcast. All music radio stations must play a minimum of 35% Canadian content between the hours of 6 AM and 6 PM. Whether a piece of music is 'Canadian' is determined by the MAPL System (see below). Due to the nature of community radio, in which much of the content played is made by local artists, it is common for them to significantly exceed the minimum Canadian content requirements.

===== The MAPL System =====
To qualify as Canadian content a musical selection must generally fulfill at least two of the following conditions:

- M (music) — the music is composed entirely by a Canadian
- A (artist) — the music is, or the lyrics are, performed principally by a Canadian
- P (performance) — the musical selection consists of a performance that is:
  - Recorded wholly in Canada, or
  - Performed wholly in Canada and broadcast live in Canada.
- L (lyrics) — the lyrics are written entirely by a Canadian

==== Community Radio Restrictions ====
Aside from the Canadian content requirements that apply to most radio stations across Canada, community radio has additional requirements and restrictions instituted by the CRTC. This includes:

- 15% of content must be spoken word programming produced locally,
- 5% of all music played consists of lesser known and/or emerging/experimental genres, and of this, 12% must be Canadian

== Funding ==
As per CRTC regulations, community radio stations must be owned and operated as a non-profit organization. This organization must primarily consist of, and be run by the members of the community that it is meant to serve. As such, the majority of the operating revenues of community radio organizations are also contributed by members of the community, often through annual memberships.

Campus-community radio stations typically receive the majority of their funding through a student levy that the students at that institution have voted on via campus-wide referendum, to support the station. As the stations on university campuses are also meant to serve the community, non-students may also become members of the organization by paying membership fees.

Community radio stations also often utilize other methods of raising funds, such as pledge drives and applying for grants.

== National Campus Radio Association ==
Most of the community radio stations in Canada are part of the National Campus and Community Radio Association (NCRA). The NCRA is a non-profit organization of campus radio and community radio stations in Canada.

The NCRA/ANREC is a not-for-profit national association of organizations and individuals committed to volunteer-based, community-oriented radio broadcasting. It is dedicated to advancing the role and increasing the effectiveness of campus and community radio in Canada. It works closely with other regional, national, and international radio organizations to: provide developmental materials and networking services to its members, represent the interests of the sector to government (particularly the Canadian Radio-television and Telecommunications Commission (CRTC)) and other agencies, and promote public awareness and appreciation for community-oriented radio in Canada. Since 1981, it has affected changes to national radio policy, helped lower tariffs affecting radio stations, and has helped stations open doors while preventing others from closing. Core initiatives include GroundWire, Dig Your Roots, !earshot, Women's Hands and Voices, the Community Radio Fund of Canada, sector-wide mailing lists, and an annual radio conference. The NCRA recognizes the cultural and social diversity of the Canadian population and is committed to facilitating the expression of this diversity and vitality within the campus and community radio broadcasting sector.

The head office of the NCRA/ANREC is located in Ottawa. A majority of English-language campus and community radio stations in Canada are members of the NCRA.

== See also ==
- List of community radio stations in Canada
