= First Words =

Canadian hip hop group

First Words was a Canadian hip hop group, consisting of Halifax beatmaker Jorun Bombay, DJ STV and emcees Above and Sean One (Sean McInerney). The group released two albums and an EP, as well as contributing tracks to several hiphop compilations, and was active from 2004 to 2008.

== History ==
In 2004, First Words recorded the song "Down With Putting Raps Down", which was featured on the National Campus and Community Radio Association's Dig Your Roots hip hop compilation album.

Also in 2004, First Words released a 16-track self-titled album of original material, and received a positive review in Exclaim!. The album was Deadbeats Entertainment's first release, kicking off the label's focus on local music. Their pre-release peaked at #1 on the top 30 and hip hop charts of Fredericton, New Brunswick's CHSR.

In 2005, Dead-Beats Entertainment released the four-track seven-inch vinyl recording, Jorun's Way/Sean One's Way. One of the tracks, "No Artificials", was a rap by First Words, and was also included on a compilation album of underground hiphop.

In 2008, First Words released Anti-Mixtape Movement, available only on vinyl, which featured four tracks from their 2008 album Cheaters. Cheaters featured guest appearances from various other hiphop artists.

Working separately, in 2007, Sean One released a compilation entitled Full of It which charted at #1 in Canada,. In 2005, Jorun released a compilation entitled Jorun's Way which featured artists Classified, Spesh, and Ghettosocks, among others. Both men continue to regularly issue new releases.

== Discography ==
- 2004 : First Words
- 2008 : Anti-Mixtape Movement E.P.
- 2008 : Cheaters
