= KPISS.fm =

Internet radio station based in New York City

KPISS.FM
- New York, New York; United States

History
- Founded: 2016

Links
- Website: kpiss.fm

KPISS.FM is an online radio station inspired by WFMU, CBC, CJSR, and other college radio in general. It was founded by and continues to be run by station manager Sheri Barclay and a panoply of like-minded volunteer DJs.

KPISS is notable for having broadcast from a specially rigged RV in the Bushwick neighborhood of Brooklyn, New York. With the onset of the COVID-19 pandemic, the station has modified its broadcasting set-up to shows done remotely from the respective DJs' homes.
