= Sound FM =

Sound FM is an on-air brand used by a number of radio stations:

- CKMS-FM (formerly branded as 100.3 Sound FM), Waterloo, Ontario, Canada
- KKLQ (FM) (formerly branded as 100.3 The Sound), Los Angeles, California, United States
