= CRFC =

CRFC may refer to:

- Caledon Rovers F.C.
- Cardiff RFC
- Carrick Rangers F.C.
- Cambuslang Rangers F.C.
- Camlough Rovers F.C.
- Carluke Rovers F.C.
- Chengdu Rongcheng F.C.
- Cobh Ramblers F.C.
- Comber Recreation F.C.
- Community Radio Fund of Canada
- Consolidated Revenue Fund of Canada
- Corrib Rangers F.C.
- Cove Rangers F.C.
- Clapham Rovers F.C.
