= CHSR =

CHSR may refer to:

- CHSR-FM, a radio station (97.9 FM) licensed to Fredericton, New Brunswick, Canada
- California High-Speed Rail
- Chillicothe Southern Railroad
