= Sudbury Theatre Centre =

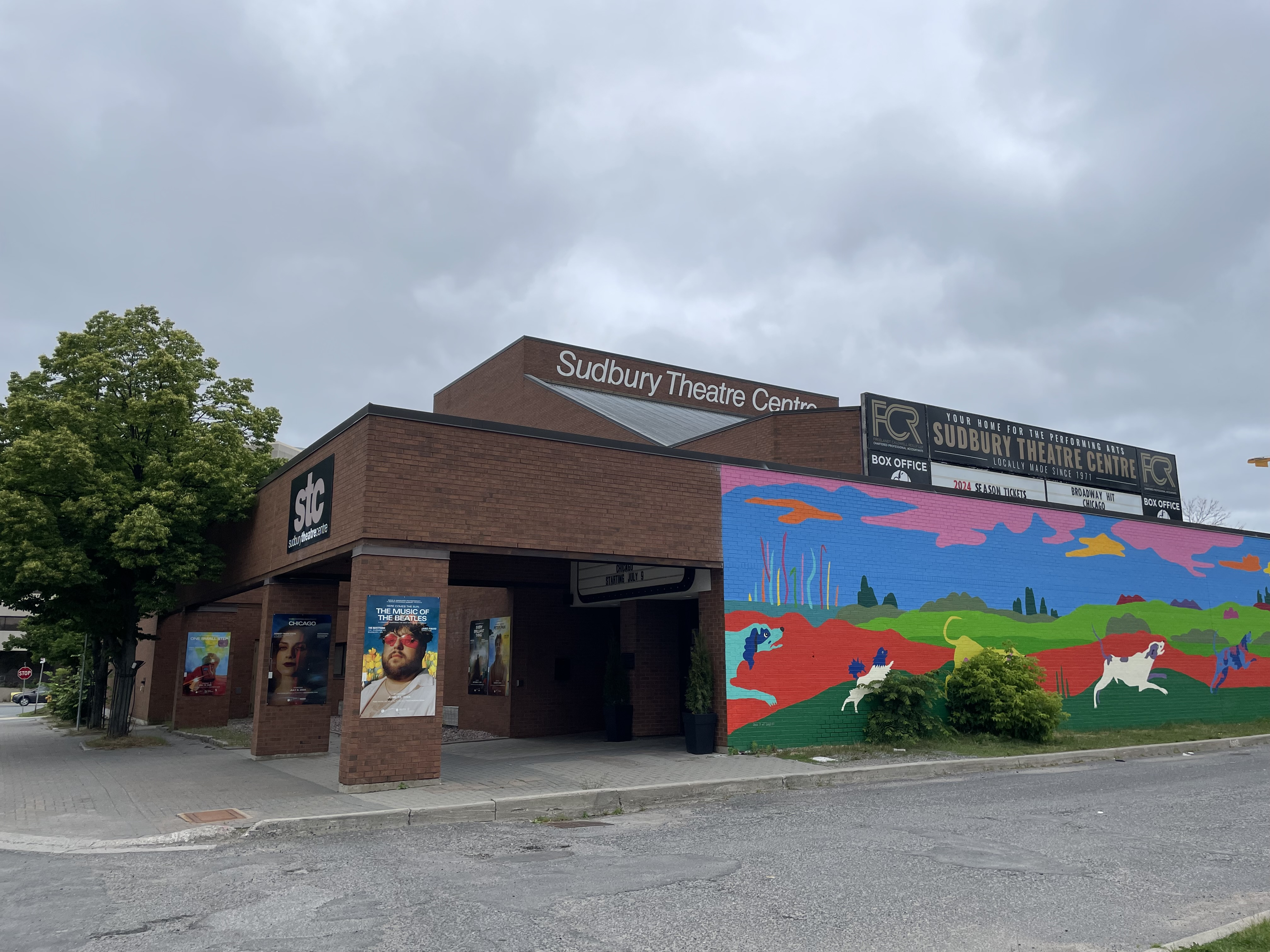
- View of the Sudbury Theatre Centre from Shaughnessy Street
- Interactive map of Sudbury Theatre Centre
- Address: 170 Shaughnessy Street; Sudbury, Ontario; P3E 4P8
- Owner: YES Theatre (2023–present)
- Type: Professional theatre
- Current use: Professional theatre and rental space

Construction
- Opened: September 14, 1971; 54 years ago
- Years active: 1971-present

Website
- www.yestheatre.com

Sudbury Theatre Centre is a theatre located in Sudbury, Ontario, Canada.

On November 1, 2023, it was announced that the entity running the venue had merged with YES Theatre. Although now managed by YES Theatre, the Sudbury Theatre Centre continues to use the same name to distinguish itself from the Refettorio, YES Theatre's other main theatre venue in the city.

== History ==
Following an Ontario government report in 1967 which recommended the creation of a theatre company in Sudbury, local arts patrons Sonja Dunn, Carolyn Fouriezos, Bill Hart, Bob Remnant and Peg Roberts raised funds to bring the Gryphon Theatre Company of Barrie to Sudbury for a production of Neil Simon's Come Blow Your Horn. That production was staged at Laurentian University's Fraser Auditorium in May 1970.

Following that production, the Sudbury Theatre Centre was officially incorporated on September 14, 1971. Over the next number of years, the STC staged plays and children's theatre workshops at Fraser Auditorium, Cambrian College and the Inco Club. Its success was largely due to the dedication of long-standing artistic director Tony Lloyd, who made it his mission to build a theatre for the people of Sudbury.

In 1980, the city of Sudbury donated a parcel of municipal land on Shaughnessy Street near Civic Square to the STC for the construction of their own permanent 289-seat theatre. Construction began in July 1981, and the new facility was officially opened at the launch of the company's 1982 theatre season.

In 2015, the theatre underwent a modernization that included renovations to the lobby and an updated and improved lounge area. At the same time, the expanded their liquor license into the auditorium and improved ticketing for expedited entry.

As of 2017, STC has expanded their programming to include a performing arts series that includes music, dance, comedy, and spectacle. These offerings complement their existing main-stage theatre series. The theatre also stages an annual youth drama program to educate students in the performing arts. In 2020, the theatre's artistic director John McHenry debuted on CKLU-FM, the campus radio station of the city's Laurentian University, as cohost of Arts at Nine, a weekly radio show about the city's arts community.
