= CFCR-FM =

Radio station in Saskatchewan, Canada

Coordinates: 52°05′12″N 106°40′12″W

- Saskatoon, Saskatchewan; Canada
- Frequency: 90.5 MHz
- Branding: 90.5 FM

Programming
- Format: community radio

Ownership
- Owner: Community Radio Society of Saskatoon

History
- First air date: September 7, 1991

Technical information
- Class: A
- ERP: 1.63 kW

Links
- Website: www.cfcr.ca

CFCR-FM is the community radio station in Saskatoon, Saskatchewan, which broadcasts at 90.5 FM. The station also streams live from their web site and airs on SaskTel Max, channel 820. CFCR-FM is a member of the National Campus and Community Radio Association (NCRA).

== History ==
When the University of Saskatchewan's campus radio station CHSK-FM (formerly CJUS) signed off the air in September 1985, a small group of concerned individuals decided to form a community radio station in Saskatoon.

Following the incorporation of the Community Radio Society of Saskatoon (CRSS) the following year, the founding members set out to convince the city that a non-profit community-run station was a feasible concept.

After attracting an impressive number of members, many of whom were former CJUS/CHSK on-air hosts, work was begun in earnest on creating a program schedule, training volunteers and arranging fundraising events.

It was at this time that a "White Knight" appeared in the form of Saskatoon Telecable, who offered the CRSS the opportunity to immediately begin broadcasting out of the Telecable studios on cable FM and the audio portion of channel 10, at no charge. This arrangement allowed the fledgling radio station to fine-tune its program schedule and provide on-air training to volunteers while preparing its license application with the CRTC. The CRSS then moved to its new home in the lower level of 103 3rd Avenue North in downtown Saskatoon. In 1991, the CRTC granted CFCR its first license to broadcast. On July 14, 1991 at about 5pm, CFCR made its first test broadcast. The first album spun was A Proud Canadian by Stompin' Tom Connors, followed shortly by the first complaint that there was too much Stompin' Tom Connors being played. September 7, 1991 at 3:19pm marked the official sign-on of CFCR as a full-powered FM radio station, broadcasting at 90.5FM. The first official program to air was Sounds of Scotland.

On March 22, 2006, CFCR increased its output power to 1630 watts, greatly improving the signal and coverage for Saskatoon's outer-lying areas.

In 2007, CFCR moved to its present location on the 3rd Floor of the beautiful heritage building at 267, 3rd Avenue South. Then in 2008, CFCR began broadcasting their live content online.

Today, CFCR boasts a membership of over 500, with approximately one-fifth of the members volunteering as on-air hosts. Programming continues to include an eclectic mix of non-commercial music of all genres, 100% locally produced spoken word shows like "Collective Voice" produced by grade 9 students at Aden Bowman, multicultural programs and specialty programming such as the "Fringe Fest Flyer," "Around The World in 800 Watts" (Folkfest coverage), and the Shakespeare on the Saskatchewan "Bardcast." CFCR often records live music performances on their interviews show The Buzz, and posts them to their website.

== Key Dates & Milestones ==
1986 – Community Radio Society of Saskatoon (CRSS) is formed.

September 20, 1987 – Official sign-on to cable FM, broadcasting out of a Saskatoon Telecable studio, evenings and weekends only.

1989 – CFCR moves out on its own, relocating to the lower level of 103 3rd Avenue North.

Summer 1991 – CRTC grants CFCR radio broadcasting privileges.

July 14, 1991 – Community Radio's first test broadcast. Then-manager Ted Stensrud spins Stompin' Tom Connors' album "A Proud Canadian" in its entirety, spurring CFCR's first official complaint.

September 7, 1991 – Community Radio's official sign-on as an FM radio station.

1994 – CFCR receives a National Campus & Community Radio (NCRA) award for Community Development.

2000 – CFCR is nominated for media outlet of the year at the Prairie Music Awards.

March 22, 2006 – CFCR increases power to 1630 watts.

Fall/Winter 2007 – CFCR moves its offices out of the basement into the 3rd floor of 267 3rd Avenue South.

January 2008 – CFCR begins broadcasting its live content online at CFCR.ca.

September 2011 – CFCR celebrates its 20th year with their "20 Years Between Your Ears" FM-Phasis funding drive campaign. The funding drive proves to be CFCR's best ever, earning over $70,000 in pledges for the first time in its history.

November 4, 2011 – CRSS (CFCR's parent non-profit organization, The Community Radio Society of Saskatoon) celebrates its 25th year. The day is deemed "Community Radio Day" in Saskatoon by Mayor Don Atchison.

September 2012 – CFCR is awarded "Best Radio Station of Saskatoon" by the readers of Saskatoon city magazine Planet S for the 10th consecutive year.

October 2016 – CFCR celebrates its 25th anniversary on the FM airwaves, with their FM-Phasis Funding Drive. The slogan for the 25th anniversary was "Saskatoon's Signal Since 1991." FM-Phasis 2016 featured live concerts by such bands as The Sadies, The Sheepdogs, Public Animal (featuring Ian Blurton) and more.

November 4, 2016 – CRSS celebrates its 30th year.

March 15, 2020 – Due to the COVID-19 pandemic, CFCR decides to close their offices and studios to the public, as well as to their Volunteers. The staff of 5 people maintains a level of live broadcasting for the next three months, and several Volunteer Hosts begin recording their programs from home. By mid-June, CFCR re-opens the studio to Volunteers, with many cleaning & distancing protocols in place.

September 2021 – CFCR celebrates its 30th anniversary on the FM airwaves.

November 4, 2021 – CRSS celebrates its 35th year.

== On-Air Programming ==
On weekdays, there is music programming from 8:00am-6:00pm, spoken word programming from 6:00pm-7:30pm, and music programming until the beginning of "The CanCon Overnighter", which plays until the programming begins the next day. On weekends, there are cultural/language programs beginning at 11:00am. Most of these shows are hosted in a language other than English. There is a variety of programs that play before and after these cultural/language shows.

== Off-Air Programming ==
CFCR hosts youth programming such as Youth Radio Summer Camp.

== Awards ==
CFCR received a National Campus & Community Radio (NCRA) award for Community Development in 1994.

In 2000, CFCR was nominated for media outlet of the year at the Prairie Music Awards

CFCR was voted "Saskatoon's Best Radio Station" in Planet S magazine's 2003, 2004, 2005, 2006, 2007, 2008, 2009, 2010, 2011 and 2012 reader polls. CFCR is the only station to receive this distinction in the 10-year history of Planet S.

== Other ==
CFCR was the callsign of an early radio station owned by Laurentide Air Service in Sudbury, Ontario in the 1920s.
