= CHLY-FM =

Radio station in Nanaimo, British Columbia

Coordinates: 49°13′19″N 124°00′12″W

CHLY 101.7FM
- The Sound of the Salish Sea
- Nanaimo, British Columbia; Canada
- Frequency: 101.7 MHz
- Branding: CHLY 101.7 FM

Programming
- Languages: Primary: English; Secondary: French, Ukrainian, and Punjabi
- Format: Eclectic
- Affiliations: National Campus and Community Radio Association

Ownership
- Owner: Radio Malaspina Society

History
- First air date: October 5, 2001

Technical information
- Licensing authority: Canadian Radio-television and Telecommunications Commission
- Class: A
- ERP: 1,300 watts; (3,000 watts maximum)
- HAAT: 95 metres (312 ft)

Links
- Webcast: www.chly.ca/listen; Listen live (via TuneIn)
- Website: www.chly.ca

CHLY-FM (101.7 MHz) is a non-profit campus-community radio station in Nanaimo, British Columbia, Canada. Primarily funded by students of Vancouver Island University's Nanaimo campus, the station is also supported by donations and memberships from the community, as well as local advertising, sponsorships and grants. CHLY-FM is run by the Radio Malaspina Society, an incorporated non-profit organization.

CHLY is a Class A station with an effective radiated power (ERP) of 1,300 watts (3,000 watts maximum). From its transmitter tower on Cottle Hill, CHLY's broadcast signal covers much of the east coast of Vancouver Island, as far north as Campbell River, south to the Cowichan Valley as well as Gabriola Island and Valdes Island. It can also be heard on the southern Sunshine Coast.

== History ==
CHLY signed on the air on October 5, 2001, but before gaining a broadcast licence, the station had its beginnings on the Internet. It first began airing programming on April 1, 2000, before receiving a licence from the Canadian Radio-television and Telecommunications Commission (CRTC) on June 5. CHLY aired a test signal at 101.7 FM on September 21, and ran promotional material about the station for two weeks before officially signing on at 6:00 p.m. on October 5, 2001.

CHLY's studios are in the basement of the Queens Hotel on Victoria Crescent in downtown Nanaimo. The station features an eclectic format with a variety of music genres including jazz, classical, reggae, alternative rock, hip-hop, blues, roots music, folk and electronica. It also airs locally produced and syndicated news and talk programs reporting on issues of the campus, local community and the world.

CHLY is a member of the National Campus and Community Radio Association.

== Alumni ==
Former CHLY talent includes:

- Tchadas Leo; An Indigenous journalist and podcaster behind the "Our Native Land" podcast from CHEK. During his years at CHLY he hosted a program called "A Native Perspective" while attending Vancouver Island University.
- Cole Schisler; Journalist. Sat on CHLY's non-profit board of directors & hosted CHLY's late night hip-hop program "The Kinetic Flow" while attending university at Vancouver Island University. Worked for the Black Press, and now works for Citytv's CityNews in Vancouver as an anchor.
- Paul Manly; Former Member of Parliament for Nanaimo-Ladysmith for the Green Party of Canada. Contributed to a political commentary program called "Elephant Talk" in the early 2000s.
