= CFLR-FM =

- La Romaine, Quebec; Canada
- Frequency: 90.1 MHz

Programming
- Languages: French, Innu
- Format: Community radio

Ownership
- Owner: Corporation de Radio Montagnaise de la Romaine

History
- First air date: 1992

Technical information
- Licensing authority: CRTC
- ERP: 1 watt
- HAAT: 9 metres (30 ft)
- Transmitter coordinates: 50°12′58″N 60°40′05″W

Links
- Website: socam.net/reseaux/cflr-89-9fm

CFLR-FM is a Canadian radio station, broadcasting at 90.1 FM in La Romaine, Quebec. The station broadcasts a community radio format with programming in both French and Innu. The station received CRTC approval in 1992.

CFLR was also the informal call sign of CKLU in Sudbury, Ontario when it broadcast only on cable FM. When that station became officially licensed as an FM radio station in 1996, it adopted its current call sign since the CFLR call sign was already in use in La Romaine.
