= CKDJ-FM =

Radio station at Algonquin College in Ottawa

Coordinates: 45°20′48.97″N 75°45′33.79″W

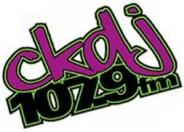
- Ottawa, Ontario; Canada
- Broadcast area: National Capital Region
- Frequency: 107.9 MHz

Programming
- Format: College radio

Ownership
- Owner: Algonquin College

History
- First air date: October 3, 1994
- Former frequencies: 96.9 MHz (1994–2003)

Technical information
- Class: A1
- ERP: 100 watts
- HAAT: 24 metres (79 ft)

Links
- Webcast: Listen Live
- Website: CKDJ.net

CKDJ-FM (107.9 MHz) is the campus radio station of Ottawa's Algonquin College. CKDJ's radio studios and transmitter are located on campus in Nepean. The station is broadcast in the communities around the campus and on the station's website for live streaming.

The station was launched in 1972 as a closed circuit outlet using the call letters CBRT (College Broadcasting Radio Television). At the time, the radio and television broadcasting programs at the college were one unit, though they were later split into two completely separate entities. It was licensed by the CRTC to broadcast on FM in 1994, and was launched on October 3 that year.

Until 2003 when it moved to its current frequency, the station broadcast on 96.9 FM with a power of only 8 watts.

The station also operates a very low-power radio station on 1700 kHz on the AM dial, known as "AIR AM 1700 | All Hit Radio".
