= Nadine Gelineau =

Canadian music industry executive and radio programmer

- Born: November 7, 1959; Ottawa, Ontario
- Died: April 7, 2016 (aged 56); Los Angeles, California
- Occupations: Music Industry Executive, Radio Programmer, DJ
- Years active: 1976-2016
- Known for: CEO & founder of The MuseBox, music marketer at BMG and TVT, radio host at CBC's Brave New Waves, program director at CKCU-FM and CKUT-FM

Nadine Gelineau was a Canadian-born music industry executive, radio programmer, and DJ, whose career spanned roles in Ottawa, Montreal, Toronto, New York, and Los Angeles, at campus radio stations, the CBC, major and independent record labels, and VICE Media, before establishing her own multi-service music company The MuseBox. During the course of her career, she marketed and promoted acts including The Killers, the Wu-Tang Clan, Bloc Party, Guided By Voices, The Brian Jonestown Massacre, and Spiritualized, managed such artists as Echo & The Bunnymen, K-Os, and The Dears, and employed the former Smiths's bassist Andy Rourke as an A&R director at her company. She was known for tenaciously promoting emerging indie artists and being well liked by both musicians and executives.

== Early career ==
Gelineau described her childhood as unconventional following her parents divorce at a young age which saw her absorb herself with 60s and 70s music, and decide in high school that she wanted to work in the music industry. In 1976 she joined Carleton University's newly established campus radio station CKCU-FM in Ottawa, Ontario, where she served as a radio host and guided the station's development while also DJing in local clubs. In 1989 Gelineau was recruited by the CBC's flagship program for alternative music, Brave New Waves, facilitating a move to Montreal where she also worked as the station manager at McGill University's CKUT-FM in the early 90s.

== Mid career ==
Gelineau joined the major label BMG Canada in 1992 where she became the head of alternative and hip hop marketing. In the mid-90s, Gelineau moved to New York City initially working for Volcano Records before joining TVT Records in 1997 where she worked for three years with artists including Guided By Voices and The Brian Jonestown Massacre. She was then recruited as the Vice President of Marketing at Chris Blackwell's newly founded Palm Pictures company in the year 2000. In 2003 she reunited with VICE Media's Shane Smith and Suroosh Alvi and became the president and founder of addVICE Marketing, an artist development agency.

== The MuseBox ==
In 2006, Gelineau founded her own artist development company, The MuseBox, in New York City. The organization went on to work with over 200 acts, with offices in Los Angeles, New York, Chicago, Toronto, Minneapolis, and Ottawa. Its focus was on developing the careers of emerging artists as well as assisting a small roster of legendary acts. Clients included The Human League, Echo & The Bunnymen, and Röyksopp. In 2010 The MuseBox merged with NYC-based Magnum PR to offer both music and lifestyle branding services. Gelineau relocated the company's headquarters to Los Angeles in 2012.

== Personal life ==
Nadine was born and raised in Ottawa, Ontario, Canada.

Nadine became a vegetarian as a teenager and was an advocate for animal welfare throughout her life. She was closely involved with the No Kill Los Angeles animal shelter, being one of the organizations most involved volunteers, spending hundreds of hours a year walking dogs and assisting in other capacities. Her own cat was named after the electronic rock group Le Tigre.

== Death ==
On April 7, 2016, Nadine died in a hospital in Los Angeles, California, five months after being diagnosed with stage four lung cancer. Following her diagnosis, over $65,000 to assist with medical bills had been quickly crowdfunded by close to 600 of her friends, family, associates, and artists. Upon her death tributes were posted by a wide array of music industry personnel and musicians, many celebrating her uniqueness and liveliness.
