= CFMU-FM =

Radio station at McMaster University in Canada

Coordinates: 43.2636°N 79.9179°W

- Hamilton, Ontario; Canada
- Broadcast area: City of Hamilton
- Frequency: 93.3 MHz

Programming
- Format: campus radio

Ownership
- Owner: McMaster Students Union

History
- First air date: January 13, 1978
- Call sign meaning: "McMaster University"

Technical information
- Licensing authority: CRTC
- Class: A1
- ERP: 166 watts average 250 watts peak vertical polarization only
- HAAT: 81 metres (266 ft)

Links
- Website: cfmu.ca

CFMU-FM is a Canadian radio station, broadcasting at 93.3 FM in Hamilton, Ontario. It is a campus/community radio station owned and operated by the McMaster Students Union at McMaster University.

== History ==
CFMU began as a project of the McMaster Radio Club in the late 1960s as a closed circuit AM station, under the auspices of the Board of Student Broadcasting. In 1976, CFMU applied for its first FM license from the CRTC for 107.9, but was denied in favour of a broadcaster in Burlington.

CFMU was eventually launched on FM on January 13, 1978, broadcasting in mono at 50 watts. They were the third college radio station to launch in Canada, after CFRC from Queen's University and CJRT, which was started by Ryerson Institute of Technology (now Toronto Metropolitan University). CFMU started out with a Wilkinson transmitter and 2-bay circularly polarized Phelps Dodge antenna.

In 1985, CFMU petitioned successfully to move its transmitter from downtown Hamilton to the top of the escarpment, near Chedoke Hospital. In 1991, faced with a wattage increase at nearby CFRU-FM in Guelph, CFMU upgraded from 50 watts to a 250-watt stereo transmitter. In 2000, CFMU decreased to a 166-watt station and began sharing a tower at Mohawk College, with Mohawk's instructional station CIOI-FM.

The station can be heard throughout much of Hamilton and Burlington, although their vertically polarized signal means the station can be heard farther on car radios.

== Programming ==
CFMU has several long-running shows:

- Classical Today hosted by Richard Kohar has been on the air for over 10 years.
- Echoes from the Amber Coast - Gintariniai Aidai, a Lithuanian cultural show, has been on the air since the station launch in January 1978;
- Leave Luck To Us debuted on February 2, 2008;
- Live N Direct has been broadcast since 1996;
- Lullabies in Razorland by Ric Taylor has been on the air for over 25 years;
- In Tha Kut has been on-air for over 20 years.
- DOPEfm debuted in April 2004
- Continuing the Media Assault debuted in 2005.

The station's programming includes local news and current affairs, politics, ethnic and religious community broadcasting, and local music, as well as a variety of genre shows.

== Administration ==
CFMU employs several full-time and part-time staff and runs with the help of over 200 volunteers. CFMU relies on an annual fundraising drive, donations, show sponsorship, and grants to continue serving the community. The station's administrative offices and broadcasting studio are located in the McMaster University Student Centre in room B119.

== Awards ==
CFMU won Radio Station of the Year at the Hamilton Music Scene Awards in 2010. CFMU has won Radio Station of the Year from the Hamilton Music Awards ten times since the awards were founded in 2004, most recently in 2016. Director Rachel Connell won Music Director of the Year in 2016; Ben Robinson won the same in 2015. In October 2024, CFMU won The Hamilton Spectator's Readers' Choice Awards for Best Radio Station.

Individual programs have won numerous awards, including:

- Radio Show of the Year, Lou's Control with Lou Molinaro
- Radio Show of the Year and Media Person of the Year, Ric Taylor for Lullabies in Razorland
- Media Person of the Year, Kristin Archer for I Heart Hamilton
