= CHUO-FM =

Radio station at the University of Ottawa

Coordinates: 45.42309°N 75.68454°W

- Ottawa, Ontario; Canada
- Frequency: 89.1 MHz

Programming
- Format: campus radio

Ownership
- Owner: Centre for Independent Media & Art Centre des medias et arts independents

History
- First air date: May 31, 1991
- Call sign meaning: University of Ottawa

Technical information
- Class: C1
- ERP: 3.2 kWs average 18.1 kilowatts peak
- HAAT: 257.5 meters (845 ft)

Links
- Webcast: MP3 stream
- Website: chuo.fm

CHUO-FM was a Canadian community-based campus radio station, broadcasting at 89.1 FM in Ottawa, on Rogers digital cable on channel 943, via RealAudio stream and in MP3. It was the campus radio station of the University of Ottawa, a member of the National Campus and Community Radio Association in Canada, and a member of the world community radio association AMARC.

CHUO's studios were located on the campus of the University of Ottawa, while its transmitter was located in Camp Fortune, Quebec.

== History ==
The station began as a radio club transmitting as CHOR, an AM carrier current station on 670 kHz in 1975 on the University of Ottawa campus. By 1984 CHOR was known as CFUO which started cable-casting and could be heard on closed circuit in the university's student residences. It was subsequently awarded a broadcast license by the CRTC, and began broadcasting at 89.1 FM on May 31, 1991.

The station is bilingual, broadcasting in both of Canada's official languages; English and French. CHUO's programming is composed of 35% English programming, 35% French programming, and 10% in third languages. CHUO's programming is free form including the genres of jazz, indie rock, electronic, classical alongside many radio programs produced BY and FOR the Black community including Ici L'Afrique, Afrika Revisited, Black on Black, Rockers, Caribbean Flavour, Bouyon Racin, Men Kontré, FREESTYLE, and more.

CHUO 89.1 FM launched a morning drive-time hip-hop show in June 2019.

In 2023, the station lost a referendum on defunding its student levy. The referendum was repeated and approved again in 2024 following legal challenges by CHUO.

In December 2025, the station officially shut down, although it continued to air prerecorded programming until March 2026.

== Notables ==
As one of the founding volunteers, Papa Richie has hosted and produced Rockers since 1986. Music journalist and radio host Aaron Badgley had a six-hour Saturday show, The Meltdown Pot, from 1987 to 1989. Patricia Harewood, Adrienne Codette, Jacquie Stewart, Sarah Onyango, Denise Isaacs and Jackie Lawrence are some members of the collective who have hosted Black on Black (Ottawa's premiere black community arts and culture show) since the early 1990s. Tom Green hosted The Midnight Caller on the station for several years in the mid-1990s before moving to television with Rogers Cable's Ottawa community channel. CHUO alumni include Adrian Harewood (CBC), Robert Fontaine (CBC/Radio-Canada), Sophie Langlois (CBC/Radio-Canada), Laura Osman (CBC), Emma Godmere (CBC), Alanna Stuart (BONJAY, CBC), Terry Loretto (CBC)

In 1997, CHUO won a Standard Broadcast award for a bilingual spoken word series entitled "Women's Words" created by Carolyn Cote and produced by Erin Flynn.

== Studios ==
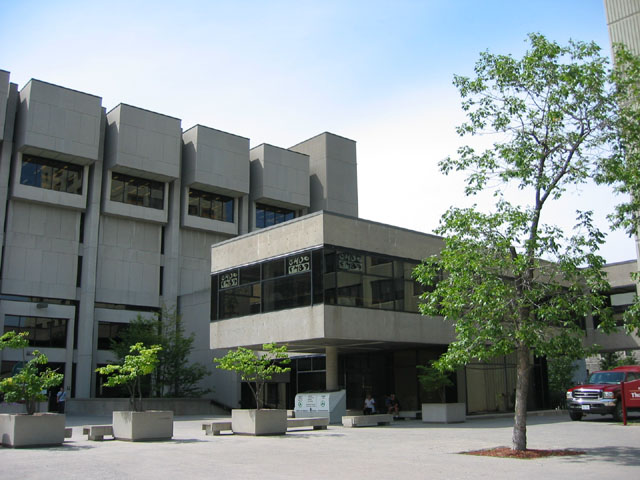
CHUO's studios used to be located in the overhanging walkway extending from the centre of this photograph towards the right, and are now located in the sub basement of Morisset Library seen in the background.

The station's studios used to be located in a walkway linking University of Ottawa's Morisset Library with the Thompson student residence. In September 2005 the station moved to new facilities in the sub-basement of the Morisset library at 65 University Private, suite 0038. Office hours are from Monday to Friday, 9 am to 5 pm.

== Shutdown ==
On December 8, 2025, it was announced that University of Ottawa's campus radio station, CHUO-FM will cease live broadcasting on December 15, 2025 after 50 years on the air. The station will remain on the air with pre recorded shows until March 2026.

No Filter Ottawa, a show aired Monday afternoons on CHUO-FM ended its live broadcasts at 4:00 pm eastern time, December 15, 2025 with the final song "All I Want for Christmas Is You" by Mariah Carey and will continue with pre recorded shows until March 2026.
