= CFUR-FM =

Radio station at the University of Northern British Columbia in Canada

Coordinates: 53°53′36″N 122°48′48″W

- Prince George, British Columbia; Canada
- Frequency: 88.7 MHz

Programming
- Format: campus radio

Ownership
- Owner: University of Northern British Columbia; (CFUR Radio Society)

History
- First air date: September 12, 2001 (licensed)

Technical information
- Class: A
- ERP: horizontal polarization only: 512 watts
- HAAT: 105 metres (344 ft)

Links
- Website: www.cfur.ca

CFUR-FM, also known as "FUR" is a campus radio station based at the University of Northern British Columbia. The station is governed by the CFUR Radio Society, a non-profit corporation consisting of students and other community members who promote CFUR via membership drives, fundraisers, and on-air broadcasting.

== Mission statement ==
According to their website CFUR's stated mission is to support the cultural, artistic, and political evolution of northern British Columbia by providing space to share and discover new music and ideas, searching for local talent, and focusing on inclusivity and diversity.

== History ==
The station was originally licensed by the Canadian Radio-television and Telecommunications Commission on 12 September 2001. The station was a developmental campus/community station, and was a licence process created by the CRTC to encourage and streamline the creation of campus and community radio stations. The station was subsequently granted a full Class A license in 2007.

CFUR-FM is a member of the National Campus and Community Radio Association

== Trivia ==
Blackfoot's "Highway Song" was the first song broadcast on 12 September 2001.
