= CJBU-FM =

Radio station in Sydney, Nova Scotia

Coordinates: 46.1697°N 60.0919°W

- Sydney, Nova Scotia; Canada
- Broadcast area: Cape Breton Regional Municipality
- Frequency: 107.3 MHz
- Branding: Caper Radio

Programming
- Format: Campus radio

Ownership
- Owner: Caper Radio Incorporated

History
- Founded: 1993, as a closed-circuit station
- First air date: November 2015

Technical information
- ERP: 50 watts

Links
- Website: www.caperradio.ca

CJBU-FM, branded as Caper Radio, is a radio station in Sydney, Nova Scotia, Canada, which broadcasts as a campus and community radio format on the frequency of 107.3 MHz (FM). The station is owned and operated by Caper Radio Incorporated, a not-for-profit corporation controlled by its board of directors, and programmed by, and serving the students at Cape Breton University. Presently, Caper Radio is a member of the NCRA and offers a majority of programming in English, but also airs selections in French and third-language.

== History ==
Caper Radio (previously known as CAPR) was founded in 1993 at Cape Breton University, which was known as the University College of Cape Breton at the time. Starting off as a closed circuit radio station, Caper Radio was exclusively online for much of its lifespan. During its early years of operation, it was owned and operated by the students' union of the university but after a vote by its board of directors, it opted to leave and seek independence from the union in 1998 in order to be a separate non-profit entity. This caused a decade-long financial struggle for Caper Radio and subsequently halted the radio's expansion to a campus station, which was pending application at the time of the departure from the union.

In March 2013, Caper Radio launched a live music fundraiser event called "On the Brink" which helped gather funds to purchase a low-power radio transmitter. Following the event's success, the radio station finally fulfilled its first step in seeking an FM approval by submitting an application to the CRTC requesting an English-language developmental license with a low-power transmission of 5 watts.

In May 2015, Caper Radio received approval from the CRTC to operate at 107.3 MHz with an effective radiated power of 5 watts (non-directional antenna with an effective height of antenna above average terrain of 9.7 metres).

== Present ==
In July 2019, Caper Radio received its approval for a campus radio license from the CRTC and will launch as a 50 watt radio station by the end of the year.

Caper Radio's mandate is to play local, independent and alternative music that may not be heard on other stations within the CBRM area. In July 2019, the radio station was awarded the Local Talent Development Award by the NCRA in recognition of its work towards promoting local artists of the Cape Breton area and hosting events that are accessible to the youth of their local communities.

Since 1994, Caper Radio has been hosting an annual local music festival called Gobblefest Music Festival, which showcases the talents of artists and musicians in the local music scene, showcasing a wide variety of alternative music. In October 2019, Caper Radio will be hosting the twenty-fifth anniversary of the first Gobblefest.
