= CFMH-FM =

Radio station at the University of New Brunswick Saint John in Canada

Coordinates: 45°18′23″N 66°05′09″W

- Canada
- Broadcast area: Saint John, New Brunswick
- Frequency: 107.3 MHz
- Branding: Local 107.3 FM

Programming
- Format: Campus radio/Community Radio

Ownership
- Owner: Campus Radio Saint John Inc.

History
- Founded: 1972 as a radio club
- First air date: January 12, 2001

Technical information
- Class: A1
- ERP: 250 watts
- HAAT: 50.5 metres (166 ft)

Links
- Website: localfm.ca

CFMH-FM is a Canadian radio station broadcasting at 107.3 MHz in Saint John, New Brunswick. It is the campus-based community radio station at the University of New Brunswick Saint John. CFMH-FM's studios and offices are located in the Thomas J. Condon Student Centre on the UNB Saint John campus in the North End of Saint John.

CFMH-FM is a member of the National Campus and Community Radio Association (NCRA). The station has hosted the 2002 and 2015 editions of National Campus and Community Radio Conference, an annual national gathering of community-oriented radio broadcasters that also hosts the annual general meeting of the NCRA.

The station was originally known as CRSJ and was available to Fundy Cable subscribers in the greater Saint John area on 104.1 MHz via cable in the 1980s and early 1990s, switching to a very low power distribution to loudspeakers in the main cafeteria and the Ward Chipman Library in the mid 1990s before its push to achieve official broadcasting status.

The station launched as CFMH in May 2000 on 92.5 FM, and adopted its current frequency on October 29, 2007. On August 14, 2010, CFMH-FM changed their branding and logo becoming LOCAL-FM. This change in branding represents the station's position as the alternative voice of the greater Saint John area with more local DJs and local programming than any other Saint John radio station.

In the past Local FM had hosted the annual Best of Saint John Music Awards, which celebrated and recognized the achievements of independent and emerging musicians in Saint John.

== Main station staff ==
Past staff:

- Brandon Logan - Station Manager (2023-Present)
- Julia Rogers - Program Director and Station Manager (2017–2022)
- Glen Swarnadhipathi - Station Manager (2017–2018)
- Michael Specht - Program Director (2015–2017)
- Brian Cleveland - Station Manager (2008–2017)
- Linda Pelletier - Station Manager (2005–2008)
- Jud Crandall - Program Director (2007–2015)

== Notable Shows ==
!earshot 20 (2012–2017): A nationally syndicated community radio program provided through the National Campus and Community Radio Association on more than 25 radio stations across Canada. Features a countdown of the top 20 albums on community radio each week, artist interviews, and a week-in-review segment from Exclaim!.

North Meets South (2010–2015): Music and talk from all points on the compass. Hosted by Joaquin Zubizaretta.

Ear Candy (prev. Rock Contours, 2007–2019): New catchy pop/rock songs married with bits of news about the artists. Hosted by Mark O'Connor.

Rock O'Clock (since 1996): New music, indie, CanCon, local and much more. Hosted by Derek Wurts (previous Programming Director).

The Gothic Horror Show (2000–present): Goth, death metal, black metal & a bit of industrial thrown in for extra flavor. Hosted by Scott Livingstone.

The Mixed Tape (2005–2017): Weekly all new, independent Canadian music program. Syndicated on over 10 community radio partners. Hosted by Brian Cleveland.

The Technicolor Dream Show (2017–2023) A psychedelic rock and pop show featuring obscure music from the 1960s and 1970s. Hosted on Friday nights by Cohen O'Connor, who goes by the name "The Wizard".

Pointless Filler (2016–Present) A weekly show focused on showcasing the music found in various video games. Film, anime, and more often finds a way to sneak into an episode. Hosted by Brandon Logan.
