= CFUV-FM =

Radio station at the University of Victoria in Canada

Coordinates: 48°27′51″N 123°18′40″W

- Victoria, British Columbia; Canada
- Broadcast area: Greater Victoria
- Frequency: 101.9 MHz

Programming
- Format: Campus radio

Ownership
- Owner: University of Victoria Student Radio Society

History
- First air date: December 17, 1984
- Call sign meaning: University of Victoria

Technical information
- Licensing authority: CRTC
- Class: A
- ERP: 883 watts; (2,290 watts maximum)
- HAAT: 58 metres (190 ft)

Links
- Website: cfuv.uvic.ca

CFUV-FM (101.9 MHz) is a campus and community radio station in Victoria, British Columbia, Canada. It is owned by the University of Victoria Student Radio Society, with studios on campus. It airs a variety of musical genres, including adult album alternative, as well as news and talk programming. It serves Greater Victoria and, via cable, Vancouver Island plus areas in the Lower Mainland.

CFUV has an effective radiated power (ERP) of 883 watts (2,290 watts maximum). It is a not-for-profit, non-commercial, volunteer-based radio station and is a member of the National Campus and Community Radio Association. CFUV is funded mainly by a levy on undergraduate studies at the University of Victoria, as well as by donations.

== History ==
CKVC, a low-power precursor to CFUV, was on air from 1965 until 1970. It was a campus station that had a broadcast range including the Student Union Building as well as two student residence buildings. The campus radio returned in 1981 after the UVic Campus Radio Club formed.

CFUV signed on the air on December 17, 1984, becoming Victoria's second FM radio station. It was powered at 49.4 watts on 105.1 FM.

In 1987 CFUV aimed to increase its transmission power so it could be heard around Victoria and its suburbs. Approval was granted by the Canadian Radio-television and Telecommunications Commission (CRTC) in September 1988; in January 1989, CFUV started broadcasting on 101.9 FM at 2290 watts. Concurrently, CFUV arranged cable broadcast all over Vancouver Island (in most areas cable 104.3 FM).

CFUV's mandate indicates that the station is focused on: providing opportunities for University of Victoria and community members to train in broadcasting and operating a radio station; providing informative, innovative, and alternative radio programming; and promoting Canadian and local artists through its broadcasting and related activities. Its programming is composed of spoken word (news, public affairs, poetry), music (rock, hip-hop, jazz, folk), and multicultural programs (in Finnish, Italian, etc.).

It hosted the National Campus and Community Radio Conference in 1998 and 2014.

Offbeat Magazine, CFUV's listings guide, was delivered around Vancouver Island and the Lower Mainland, but is now defunct.
