= CIVL-FM =

Radio station at the University of the Fraser Valley in Abbotsford, British Columbia

- Abbotsford, British Columbia; Canada
- Broadcast area: Fraser Valley
- Frequency: 101.7 MHz (FM)
- Branding: CIVL Radio

Programming
- Format: Campus radio

Ownership
- Owner: UFV Campus and Community Radio Society

History
- First air date: September 7, 2010
- Former frequencies: 88.5 MHz (2006–2010)

Technical information
- Class: A
- ERP: Horizontal polarization: 880 watts (peak); 520 watts (average); Vertical polarization: 440 watts (peak); 220 watts (average)
- HAAT: 104 metres (341 ft)
- Transmitter coordinates: 49.0722°N 122.403°W

Links
- Webcast: Listen Live
- Website: civl.ca

CIVL-FM is a Canadian radio station located at the University of the Fraser Valley (Building S) in Abbotsford, British Columbia. More commonly known as CIVL Radio, the station serves the Fraser Valley Regional District, specifically the surrounding communities of UFV in Abbotsford, Chilliwack and Mission.

== History ==
On September 7, 2006, Campus and Community Radio Society (UCFV) application was licensed by the Canadian Radio-television and Telecommunications Commission to operate a new English-language community-based campus FM radio station at the University College of the Fraser Valley in Abbotsford on the FM frequency of 88.5 MHz (channel 203A) with an average effective radiated power (ERP) of 92 watts.

On May 21, 2010, the CRTC approved UFV Campus and Community Radio Society licence to move CIVL-FM from 88.5 MHz to 101.7 MHz. CIVL-FM signed on the air at its current 101.7 MHz frequency in September 2010. On January 17, 2012, the CRTC approved CIVL-FM's authorized contours by increasing its average effective radiated power (ERP) from 220 to 520 watts (maximum ERP from 550 to 880 watts), by decreasing the effective height of antenna above average terrain from 121 to 104 metres (directional antenna) and by relocating its transmitter site.

== Notes ==
CIVL is a member of the National Campus and Community Radio Association.
