= Community Radio Fund of Canada =

Independent non-profit organization

The Community Radio Fund of Canada/le Fonds canadien de la radio communautaire is a Canadian not-for-profit organization that funds non-commercial community and campus radio stations and projects. The CRFC was founded in November 2007 by Canada's three largest associations of community radio stations: the National Campus and Community Radio Association, the Alliance des radios communautaires du Canada, and the Association des radiodiffuseurs communautaires du Québec.
