= CFBX-FM =

Radio station in Kamloops

- Kamloops, British Columbia; Canada
- Frequency: 92.5 MHz
- Branding: The X

Programming
- Format: campus radio

Ownership
- Owner: The Kamloops Campus/Community Radio Society

History
- First air date: 2001

Technical information
- Class: A
- ERP: 420 watts
- HAAT: −177.7 metres (−583 ft)
- Transmitter coordinates: 50°40′23.16″N 120°22′1.20″W

Links
- Website: www.thex.ca

CFBX-FM 92.5 FM, also known as "The X", is a campus radio station at Thompson Rivers University in Kamloops, British Columbia, Canada.

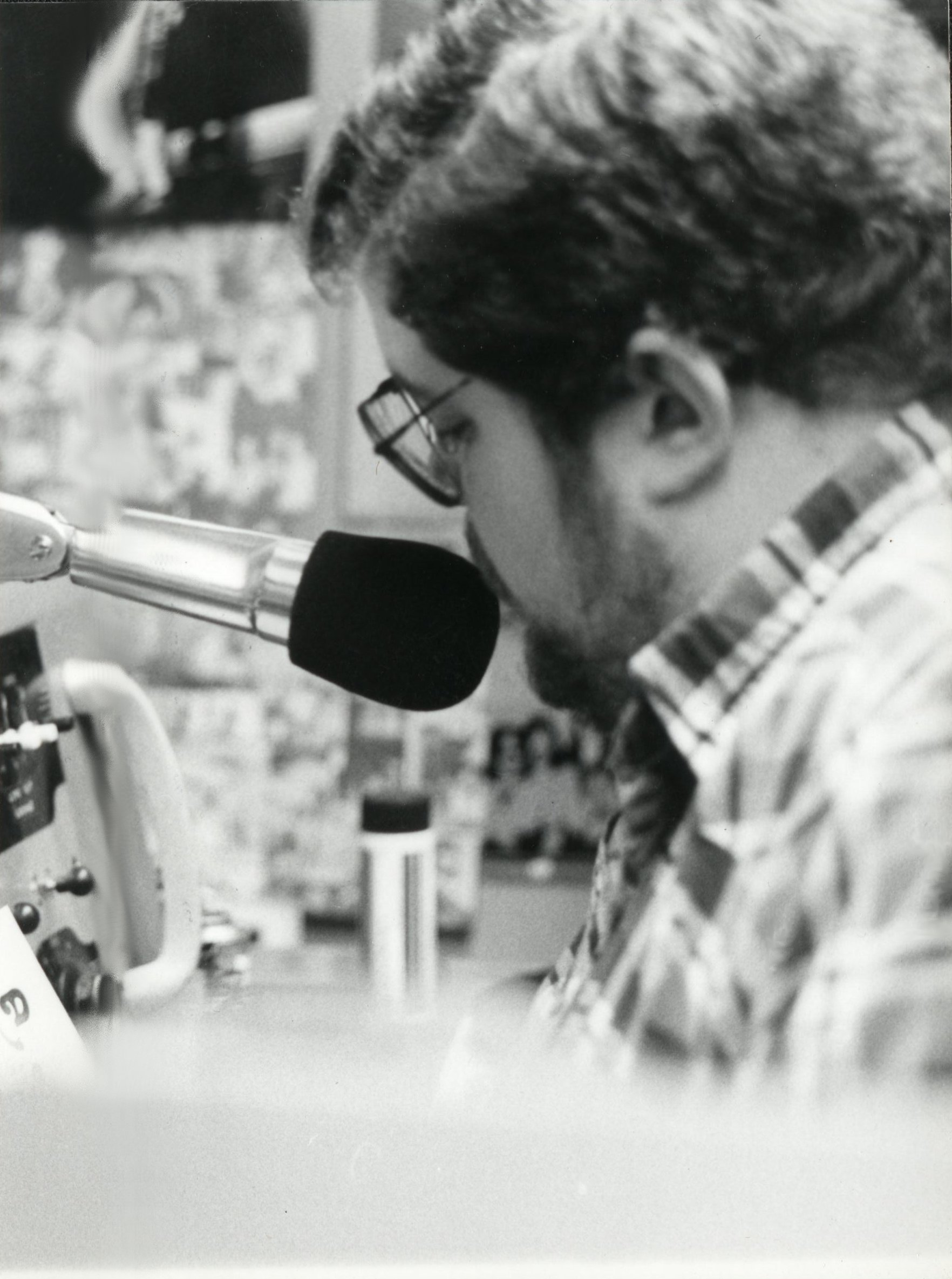
Steve Wind. Class of 1989. During one of the scheduled radio programs.

During the 1980s, CFBX began operations at the university (then called Cariboo College) as a closed-circuit radio station under the name CMMD Radio. CMMD was short for Communications Media, the name of the course that produced and aired the station's content, produced a monthly campus newspaper (the 210 Express) and a weekly in house television news program. At this time CMMD Radio was located in room 210 of the Old Main building and only broadcast to the student lounges and the cafeteria at specific times of the day. This was entirely due to the radio station being run on a volunteer basis by the students enrolled in the Communications Media Program and as a training environment for the course curriculum. Students were given free run of the content and types of music played, as long as it followed the rules and regulations setout by the CRTC. All advertising, station IDs and promos were written and produced by the students, and students were encouraged to go out into the community to gather news and cover community events. Unfortunately by the beginning of the 1990s, the Communications Media Program was dropped and CMMD Radio was off the air.

During the early 2000s, CFBX applied to the CRTC for a license for a low-power radio station, which was approved.

Following CRTC approval, the station commenced aerial broadcasting on April 2, 2001, at 8:00am.

CFBX-FM is a member of the National Campus and Community Radio Association (NCRA).

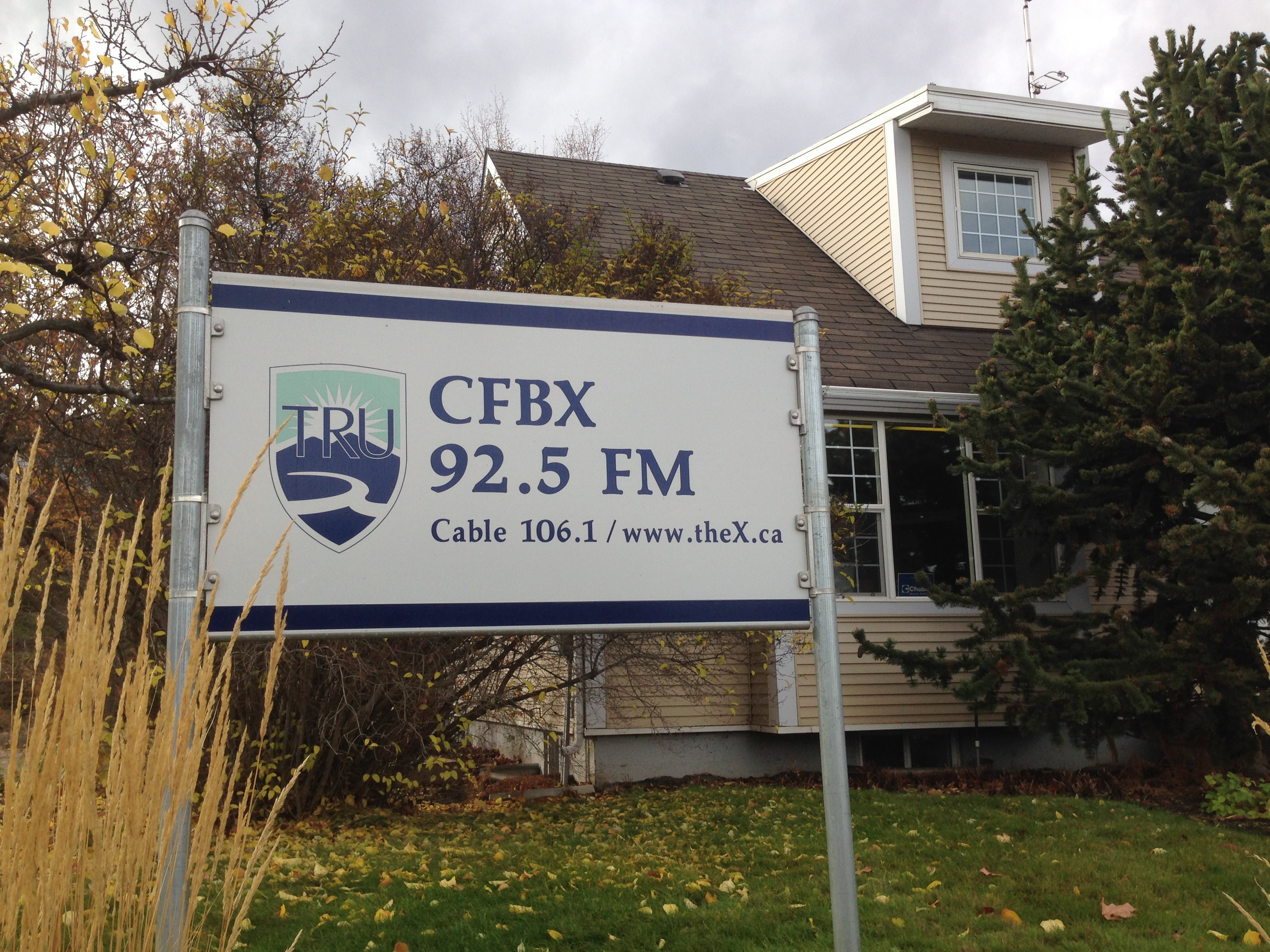
Home of Thompson Rivers University campus radio station CFBX
