= CKDU-FM =

Radio station at Dalhousie University in Halifax, Nova Scotia

Coordinates: 44°39′03″N 63°39′25″W

- Halifax, Nova Scotia; Canada
- Broadcast area: Halifax Regional Municipality
- Frequency: 88.1 MHz
- Branding: CKDU 88.1 FM

Programming
- Format: Campus radio

Ownership
- Owner: CKDU-FM Society

History
- Founded: 1964
- First air date: February 1, 1985
- Call sign meaning: Dalhousie University

Technical information
- Licensing authority: CRTC
- ERP: 2,460 watts (horiz.)
- HAAT: 156.5 metres (513 ft)

Links
- Website: www.ckdu.ca

CKDU-FM (88.1 FM) is a non-profit radio station broadcasting from the campus of Dalhousie University in Halifax, Nova Scotia, Canada. It airs a campus radio format serving the Halifax Regional Municipality area and is operated by the not-for-profit CKDU-FM Society. Its mandate is to provide the Halifax area with an alternative to public and private radio broadcasting. The 2,460 watt transmitter reaches the urban core of Halifax and adjacent communities.

== History ==
CKDU evolved from the Dalhousie University radio club, Radio Tiger, which dated back at least to the 1950s. In 1975, the station was dubbed CKDU and began broadcasting via closed circuit to Dalhousie residence halls from the Dalhousie Student Union Building (the SUB). After a successful student referendum to fund the station, and approval from the CRTC on October 10, 1984, CKDU started broadcasting on 97.5 FM with only 33 watts. The signal was sufficient to cover the area around the university, with poorer reception throughout the rest of the city. At the time of launch the station was managed by Doug Varty, formerly of CHSR-FM in Fredericton, New Brunswick, and Keith Tufts, later to found alternative performance venues the Club Flamingo and the Pub Flamingo.

The former CKDU logo, used from the late 1980s to 2006.

The station's programming was initially heavily weighted to what was then considered "alternative" popular music, including such artists as Bauhaus, Ministry, Kate Bush and the Cure. In addition, the station broadcast several magazine style information programs during the day. In late 1985, Mark MacLeod was hired after working at CHMA-FM in Sackville, New Brunswick, to become the station's program director. Working with other station staff, he diversified the station's music programming to include more jazz, world music, and other specialty genres.

In 2000, CKDU-FM received permission from the CRTC to upgrade its transmitter to a power of 3,200 watts. On February 14, 2006 at 7:00 p.m. AST, the station moved from 97.5 MHz to 88.1 MHz.

On April 9, 2010, CKDU received approval to decrease its power from 3,200 watts to 2,460 watts. But it improved its tower's height above average terrain to 156.5 metres (513 ft). So while its power was lower, its coverage area remained roughly the same.

== Programming ==
The programming on CKDU tends to be eclectic. In-house policy is that anything that is commonly heard on a commercial or public (i.e. the CBC) radio station should not be heard on CKDU. CKDU's license also prohibits it from playing selections that have made certain charts such as the Billboard Hot 100 chart, preventing it from entering into competition with local commercial Top 40 stations.

CKDU is one of the few radio stations based in the Maritimes where one can hear local hip-hop, live electronic music, liberal and anarchist news shows, and the like. CKDU also hosts a number of shows programmed by ethnic minorities in the Halifax area, frequently broadcasting in their native languages rather than either of the official languages of Canada. Most CKDU programming is either a weekly show with occasional specials. During the 1980s, CKDU hosted a queer show called “The Word is Out”, that was organized and coordinated out of Dalhousie University. The radio show discussed news and current affairs impacting the queer community at the time. Most notably, the show openly discussed the AIDS epidemic occurring around the world and specifically referenced how it affected people in Halifax. As a station regulated by the CRTC, CKDU is also bound by Canadian Content regulations.

== Membership ==
CKDU relies on its membership both for its day-to-day operations and for programming. While all members of the Dalhousie Student Union are automatically members of CKDU-FM, membership is also open to others who wish to pay dues and meet time, training and other membership requirements.

It is reasonably straightforward to become a programmer at CKDU-FM. One puts in approximately 10 hours of volunteer work doing things like staffing phones and putting up flyers and then is eligible for CKDU membership and programming privileges after a short training course is completed.

== Funding ==
CKDU is supported for the most part by the Dalhousie Student Union. However some of its operating budget comes from fundraising drives conducted each year and for sales of advertising and sponsorships. There are only a few paid staff at the station.

CKDU runs ad spots from a variety of advertisers, usually local nightspots and other businesses aimed at young adult clients. The station also airs community announcements for no fee. The fundraising drives are conducted both by calling previous supporters of the station and by soliciting donations on air. On air donations are sometimes rewarded with prizes of some kind, supplied by the programmer or local businesses. In addition, government and some other grants help with both general revenue and funding for specific projects.

== Facilities ==
CKDU is located on the fourth floor of the Dalhousie Student Union Building (6136 University Ave.) and is accessible to the general public. The facilities consist of a main lobby/waiting room, three offices for the paid station administration, the station's record collection room, a maintenance room, a production studio (PCR) and the Master Control room (MCR) itself.

The broadcast booth houses the station's CD collection, as well as new releases for easy access by the programmers. The equipment consists of a pair of Technics SL-1200s, a mixer and mixing board, a number of CD decks, an audio-enabled computer, inputs for external devices, and a reel-to-reel machine. The booth is furnished with numerous chairs for the programmers and guests.

== CKDU presenters and alumni ==
- Buck 65 - hip-hop artist, hosted the show "The Bassment", later renamed "The Treatment"
- Jesse Dangerously - nerdcore hip hop artist and former host of "The Pavement", renamed from "The Treatment"
- Jane Farrow - worked as program director and show host, later worked as a producer and show host for the Canadian Broadcasting Corporation
- Jay Ferguson of the band Sloan produced and hosted a music program on CKDU-FM in the 1980s.
- Skratch Bastid - hip-hop DJ, also hosted "The Treatment"
- Matt Murphy - hosted Little Orton Hoggett radio show, musician in The Super Friendz and TUNS
- Lex Gigeroff - former manager in the early FM days, later credited as a creator of scifi show Lexx
- Mike Catano - member of indie rock band North of America amongst others
- Walter Kemp, host of "Saturday Morning Musical Box" (classical music) since 1985.
- Bev Lamb, host of "Touchstone", (folk music) since 1985.

== See also ==
- List of radio stations in Nova Scotia
- List of campus radio stations in Canada
