= CFBU-FM =

Radio station in St. Catharines, Ontario

Coordinates: 43.15629°N 79.24792°W

- St. Catharines, Ontario; Canada
- Frequency: 103.7 MHz

Programming
- Format: Campus radio

Ownership
- Owner: Brock University Student Radio

History
- Founded: 1979
- First air date: 1997
- Call sign meaning: Brock University

Technical information
- Class: A1
- ERP: 250 Ws horizontal polarization only
- HAAT: 90.5 metres (297 ft)

Links
- Website: www.cfbu.ca

CFBU-FM is a radio station serving St. Catharines, Ontario, Canada. Branded on-air as Brock Radio, it is the community-based campus radio station of Brock University. The station broadcasts at 103.7 FM, with an effective radiated power of 250 watts, from a transmitter located atop the Arthur Schmon Tower on the Brock campus.

== History ==
On May 7, 1979, the Brock University Students' Union was granted a licence for a new carrier current station to serve portions of the university campus. It would broadcast on 640 kHz on the AM broadcast band with a power of 20 watts. It was uncertain of how long the station operated for and when it left the air on the AM band.

On January 30, 1997, Brock Radio Collective, on behalf of a company to be incorporated (Brock University Student Radio) received approval from the Canadian Radio-television and Telecommunications Commission (CRTC) to operate an English language FM campus/community radio programming undertaking at St. Catharines, on the frequency 103.7 MHz (channel 279A1), with an effective radiated power of 250 watts. CFBU-FM signed on the air in later 1997.

When the university required the space the station occupied on campus in 2003, CFBU relocated its studios to a privately owned student residence building at 30 Ontario Street in downtown St. Catharines.

CFBU-FM is a member of the National Campus and Community Radio Association (NCRA).
