= Ian Mendes =

Canadian journalist with The Athletic (born 1976)

Ian Mendes (born December 28, 1976) is a Canadian ice hockey executive who currently serves as vice president of communications for the Ottawa Senators of the National Hockey League (NHL). He previously worked as a journalist and reporter with The Athletic, TSN 1200 Radio, and Sportsnet East, covering the Senators and the NHL.

== Biography ==
Mendes was born in Mississauga, Ontario to parents who immigrated from Tanzania. After graduating from Carleton University's Journalism Program in 1998, he entered public relations with the Ottawa Lynx AAA baseball club, and wound up working on two occasions as their mascot, Lenny the Lynx. After a brief stint with the Ottawa Senators' Public Relations Department, he joined Sportsnet in 2001 where he covered several MLB World Series and NHL Stanley Cups. During the 2012 World Series he was hit in the back with a foul ball during batting practice just as he was about to go live, the video clip of the incident has over 2M views on YouTube. He currently works for the Ottawa Senators of the National Hockey League.

Mendes is of Goan Indo-Canadian descent and has two daughters with his wife Sonia.
