= CJUS-FM =

Former radio station at the University of Saskatchewan in Saskatoon, Saskatchewan

- Saskatoon, Saskatchewan; Canada
- Frequency: 89.7 MHz
- Branding: CJUS-FM

Programming
- Format: campus radio

Ownership
- Owner: University of Saskatchewan

History
- First air date: 1965
- Last air date: September 30, 1985
- Former call signs: CHSK-FM (1983–1985)

CJUS-FM was a Canadian radio station, which aired in Saskatoon, Saskatchewan from 1965 to 1985. It was a campus radio station operated by the University of Saskatchewan. Studios were initially located in the basement of the university's Memorial Union Building, but were moved to the basement of the Education Building in 1980 next to the Department of Audio Visual Services.

The station was launched through a partnership between the university's board of governors and its student union. For a number of years, the station also aired some programming from the CBC Stereo network before CBKS was launched.

In 1983, with the station in financial trouble, it began to accept limited commercial advertising, and briefly changed its call sign to CHSK. The following year, the university's board decided to discontinue its funding of the station, and CHSK ceased broadcasting on September 30, 1985.

The university has never applied for another broadcast license. It maintains an informal relationship with the independent community radio station CFCR-FM, which actively solicits volunteers among the university's student body.

In 2005, CJUS was relaunched as an Internet radio stream.
