= CIMN-FM =

Former radio station at the University of Prince Edward Island

- Charlottetown, Prince Edward Island; Canada

Programming
- Format: Campus radio

Ownership
- Owner: U.P.E.I. Student Radio Inc.
- Operator: UPEI Student Union

History
- First air date: 1970 (low power); 1983 (102.3 FM); 1995 (90.3 FM)
- Last air date: 2000
- Former call signs: CSUR (carrier current)
- Call sign meaning: Campus Information Music & News

CIMN-FM was a Canadian campus radio station at the University of Prince Edward Island in Charlottetown, Prince Edward Island.

The station began as a "very low power broadcast station", known as Radio UPEI and operated from the top floor of the administrative building in 1970. The transmitters were home-made and of solid state design. In 1972, the UPEI Student Union funded upgrades to a carrier current system operating on 700 kHz using the callsign CSUR. This conflicted with international callsign allocations (the ITU prefix CS is assigned to Portugal, not Canada), so a new application was made for the callsign CIMN (Campus Information Music & News).

A series of transmitters, using the electrical wiring of buildings as the antenna system, were located in the various residences. A set of control rooms and production studios located on the 4th floor of Main Building remained in operation for a number of years. At that time, the station had a station manager, and a news director, paid for by the Student Union. The station also began to simulcast audio via the local cable television system into homes in the area.

In 1982, the studios were moved to the Barn, which housed student union offices and student activity areas on campus. As of the 1980s, the station primarily ran a Top 40 music format, but was mixed with AOR and a small smidge of adult contemporary. Its music surveys also combined both Top 40 and AOR all-in-one. Despite this, CIMN is the only radio station in Prince Edward Island to feature a contemporary hits format at the time, despite CFCY having an AC format that also played hits from the CHR formula at the time.

The station received a full FM license in 1995 to broadcast at 90.3 FM, despite the station began simulcasting on 102.3 FM via cable in November 1983. And at this point, legal problems began. CIMN became the first Canadian station without a full-time staff person to be granted a broadcast license by the Canadian Radio-television and Telecommunications Commission (CRTC).

The licence expired in August 2000 and was not renewed.
