= Cambrian College =

Public college in Ontario, Canada

Coordinates: 46°31′48.56″N 80°56′27.86″W

Cambrian College of Applied Arts and Technology
- Type: Public College of Applied Arts and Technology
- Established: 1967; 59 years ago
- Affiliations: CCAA, ACCC, AUCC,
- President: Kristine Morrissey
- Students: 3,174 FTEs (2025: 3,020 FTEs)
- Location: Sudbury, Ontario, Canada
- Campus: Urban
- Colours: Burgundy
- Nickname: Golden Shield
- Mascot: Burnie the Dragon
- Website: cambriancollege.ca

Cambrian College, established in 1967, is a college of applied arts and technology in Greater Sudbury, Ontario, Canada, partnered with private Hanson College of Business, Health and Technology in Brampton and Toronto. It is attended primarily by international students.

== History ==
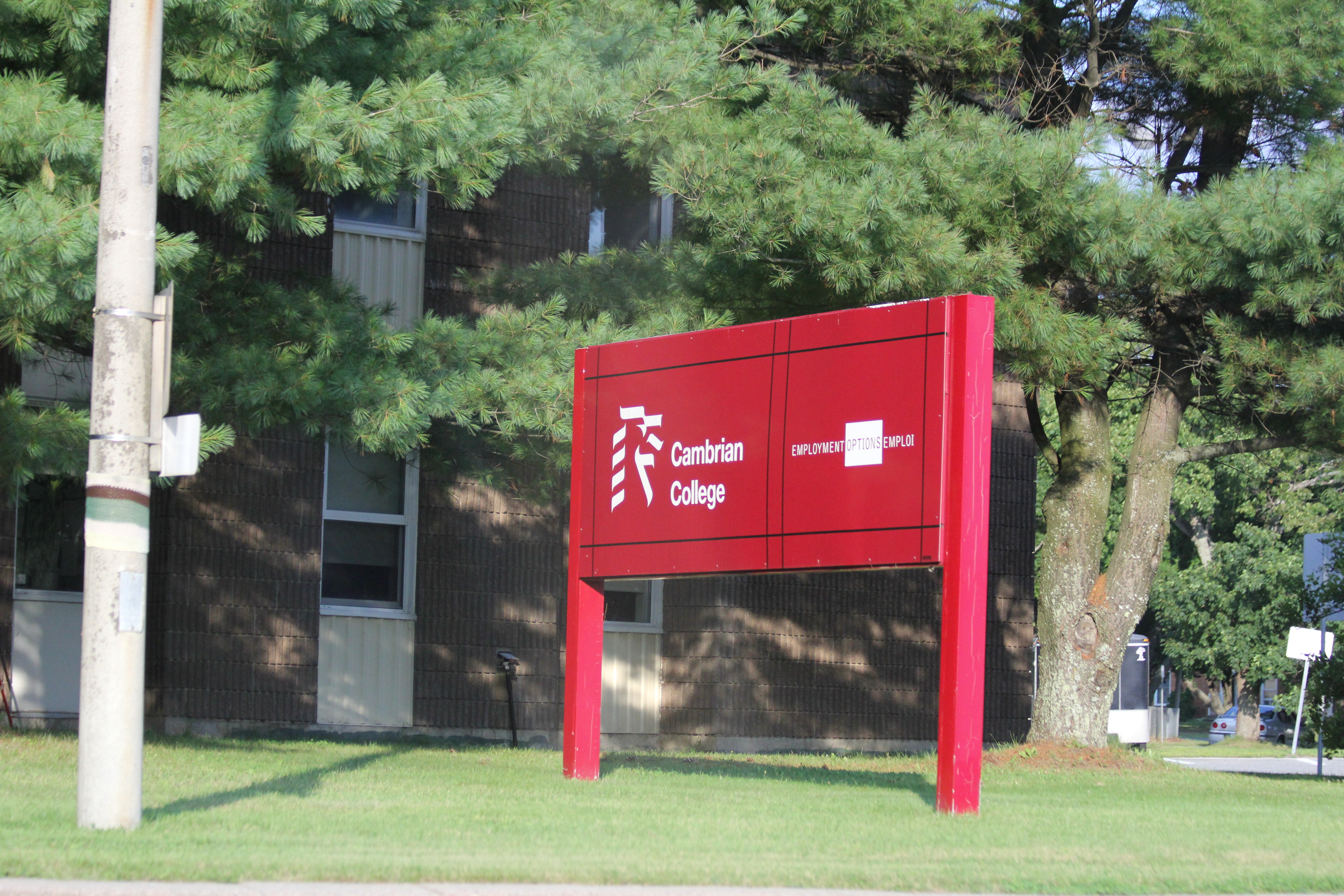
The sign and building for Cambrian College in Espanola

Cambrian College was founded as a trade school in 1967, during the formation of Ontario's college system. It was originally established with campuses in Sudbury, North Bay and Sault Ste. Marie; the North Bay and Sault campuses became the independent Canadore College and Sault College in 1972 and 1973, respectively.

Until 1995, Cambrian was a bilingual institution, offering courses in both English and French. In that year, the French programs were transferred to Collège Boréal.

In 2017 the college was hit with a ransomware attack that downed many systems. From 2018 to 2024 Cambrian's international student population grew by 208%. In the same time period Cambrian's annual revenue went from under $100 million to nearly $300 million.

== Student population and programs ==
The largest college in Northern Ontario, Cambrian College has over 4,100 full-time students and close to 80 full-time programs, a number of which are uniquely suited to the academic and employment aspirations of First Nations people. An additional 9,000 registrations are taken annually for part-time personal, professional and human resources development courses, workshops and seminars. Delivery methods include classroom learning, independent learning, distance education and the Internet.

The various programs at Cambrian College are organized under the umbrella of five larger schools:

- Schools of Business and Information Technology; Creative Arts, Design and Hospitality.
- Schools of Health Sciences and Emergency Services
- Schools of Justice; Community Services; and General Studies
- Schools of Skills Training; and Community and Corporate Learning
- School of Engineering Technology and Environmental Studies

In May 2021, it was announced that the College would no longer be accepting new applications for the Music Program. Despite the required minimum number of applications being met, the Music Program is not going to have a September 2021 intake of students.

The percentage of Cambrian student headcount comprised by international student has grown significantly over the past decade. In 2013-14 learners on a student visa comprised 2% of total student headcount. In 2021-22 that number had grown to 56%.

== Student associations ==
Cambrian is also home to 3 particular student government associations; SAC (Students Administrative Council), CNSA (Cambrian Native Students Association) and the CAA (Cambrian Athletics Association). All three provide essential services to students, although SAC represents every student on campus and provides specific services regarding students and student life. These services range from basic student services like faxing and mailing duties; to the executive council members of SAC dealing with academic appeals, clubs and associations duties, college-wide changes, leadership and other concerns. The executive of SAC reports to a student body elected President (As do the CAA and CNSA)..

== Computer and engineering technology ==
The energy systems program was launched in fall 2007 at the Barry Downe campus and features "The Living Building Project" which has received significant government and industry funding. Students in the energy systems program take classes in areas as varied as chemistry, instrumentation and biology and take a hands-on role in the construction and design of "The Living Building Project".

== University transfer agreements ==
Cambrian College has agreements with universities in Canada and in countries that include Australia and the USA that enhance student mobility between college and university. These agreements formally recognize credits earned at each institution and facilitate the transfer of these credits between institutions.

== Cambrian College in Toronto, Brampton and Vancouver ==
In 2005, Cambrian College entered into a partnership with Hanson Canada to create Cambrian @ Hanson. At the three campus locations in Toronto, Brampton and Vancouver, Hanson is delivering Cambrian College programs exclusively to international students. Hanson is also a registered Private Career College in both Ontario (registered with MTCU) and in BC (registered with PTIB). A report commissioned by the Ontario Ministry of Advanced Education and Skills Development (MAESD) in 2017 stated that private public partnership arrangements pose unacceptable risks. This includes limited ability to ensure academic standards and potentially subverting the intent of Canada’s federal immigration strategy. This lead the government of the day to direct a phase out of public private college partnerships, a decision that was later reversed by the Ford Government.

== Media ==
In 2009, The Shield, Cambrian's student-run newspaper was replaced by a daily-updated website, cambrianshield.ca, and a new glossy magazine. The first edition of the Shield magazine was released on November 6. Both are put together by students in the college's journalism program. In March 2013 the website and magazine was shut down after the journalism program was suspended in 2012.

Students of the Broadcast — New Media program also host shows on Laurentian University's campus station CKLU-FM.

=== Radio ===
Cambrian College had a closed-circuit radio station called CCRS Cambrian College Radio Station which was heard around the campus. It is unknown when the station was launched or shutdown.

== Sports ==
The college is represented in the Canadian Colleges Athletic Association by the Cambrian Golden Shield.

== Notable alumni ==
- Brian Bigger, Canadian politician
- Brian Hayes, Canadian politician
- Will Morin, Canadian politician
- Glenn Thibeault, Canadian politician

== See also ==
- Canadian government scientific research organizations
- Canadian industrial research and development organizations
- Canadian university scientific research organizations
- Higher education in Ontario
- List of colleges in Ontario
- WannaCry ransomware attack
