= CKUW-FM =

Radio station at the University of Winnipeg in Winnipeg, Manitoba

- Winnipeg, Manitoba; Canada
- Broadcast area: Winnipeg Metropolitan Region
- Frequency: 95.9 MHz
- Branding: 95.9 CKUW

Programming
- Format: Campus radio

Ownership
- Owner: The Winnipeg Campus/Community Radio Society

History
- First air date: April 30, 1999
- Call sign meaning: University of Winnipeg

Technical information
- Class: A
- ERP: 450 watts
- HAAT: 86 metres (282 ft)
- Transmitter coordinates: 49°52′51″N 97°08′57″W

Links
- Webcast: Listen Live
- Website: ckuw.ca

CKUW-FM (95.9 MHz) is the campus radio station at the University of Winnipeg in Winnipeg, Manitoba, Canada. The station broadcasts with 450 watts effective radiated power. Its transmitter and antenna are located atop 7 Evergreen Place in the Osborne Village neighbourhood of Winnipeg.

Local cultural programs are a large part of the schedule, and a quarter of CKUW's programming consists of spoken word shows covering local news, the entertainment scene, and community/social justice issues. The station operates 24 hours a day 7 days a week with all the programming being done by volunteers.

== History ==
Beginning as CJUC, the station was started in 1963 by student David Shilliday and physics professor Ron Riddell. In 1968 the call sign was changed to CKUW-FM to mark the founding of the University of Winnipeg. At that time the station operated as a closed circuit station broadcasting to Lockhart Hall lounges, the Buffeteria and the Bulman Students Centre. Despite the small presence on campus, CKUW had a disproportionate effect on the local music scene, including spawning local music magazine Stylus and launching the career of several local media personalities.

After a decade of fundraising and planning for an actual FM radio station, CKUW's licence application was approved by the Canadian Radio-television and Telecommunications Commission (CRTC) in October 1998. Test broadcasts started on April 27, 1999, and the official kickoff broadcast started on April 30. Station manager Rob Schmidt gave a brief introduction, and the first song was "That's Entertainment" by The Jam.

Long time shows featured on CKUW radio include Bluesday with Rockin' Ronnie, People of Interest (morning news magazine, formerly The Beat), Say It, Sista! (feminist news), Black Mask (anarchist viewpoints), Stylus Radio (based on the University of Winnipeg music magazine, Stylus), The Ultra Mega Sports Show (sports commentary), and Antennas to Heaven (political satire). CKUW also airs some popular syndicated talk radio shows from around North America, such as Democracy Now! and Alternative Radio.

== Fundraising ==
CKUW is volunteer driven and runs as a non profit organization. The station receives its core funding through a student levy at the University of Winnipeg. The levy is responsible for just over half of the stations budget and only covers basic operations.

== Community programs ==
Radio Camp is a community radio project that CKUW organizes and sponsors every year for kids 12 and under to introduce them to community radio. They are enrolled for two weeks in the month of July to produce two radio shows that broadcast live with their stories and creative input with help from CKUW staff. The purpose is to introduce alternative media to a younger audience while having fun with radio as well.

CKUW Radio Drama is a community radio program that was implemented in early 2008. A radio drama is a story that is made for radio through the use of script and sound to convey action and dialogue. Funded by the Manitoba Arts Council, the radio drama, "At the Monarch's Convenience" takes place in downtown Winnipeg's West End with the fictional Monarch's Convenience Store as the backdrop in the story. It tells the stories of various individuals living in the area of Sargent and Ellice Avenue dealing with problems such as runaway children, vandalism, pregnancy. The characters find a way to deal with the situations in a "beautiful, moving, and worth their time and effort". The director of CKUW's Radio Drama is Jason Hooper. A group of writers consisting of students, outside community members and CKUW volunteers help to write and produce the show.

== Committees ==
There are various committees the station has made, such as the Board of Directors and Programming Committee. The Board of Directors is elected by the volunteers to manage the long-term issues of the station. The group consists of one university representative, one student union representative, three elected student representatives and four elected community representatives. An Annual General Meeting of CKUW is held once a year for all members to attend and vote on new policies, bylaws, and new members on to the Board of Directors.

== CKUW alumni ==
Alumni from CKUW include former MuchMusic VJ Bradford How, CITI-FM Morning Show Host Joe Aiello, Winnipeg Free Press Columnists Jill Wilson, Ben Sigurdson, CBC Producer and DJ Sarah Michaelson (aka Mama Cutsworth), CJNU-FM announcer/operator Andy (Drew Williams) Tataryn, radio personalities Alan Cross, Andrea Collins, and former CJKR-FM Music Director Casey Norman.
