= CKLU-FM =

Radio station in Sudbury, Ontario

Coordinates: 46°25′29″N 81°00′53″W

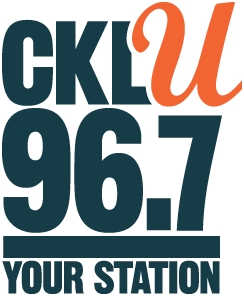
- Sudbury, Ontario; Canada
- Frequency: 96.7 MHz
- Branding: CKLU

Programming
- Format: campus radio
- Affiliations: Sudbury Wolves

Ownership
- Owner: Laurentian University

History
- First air date: 1997
- Call sign meaning: Laurentian University

Technical information
- Class: A
- ERP: 1,300 watts
- HAAT: 122 metres (400 ft)

Links
- Website: www.cklu.ca

CKLU-FM is a Canadian radio station, which broadcasts at FM 96.7 in Sudbury, Ontario. It is the campus radio station of the city's Laurentian University, and airs programming in both English and French, along with special interest programming for other language communities in the area.

== History ==
The station launched in 1984 as a closed circuit station, available only in certain locations on campus. In 1986, the station was added to cable FM service in Sudbury, using the unofficial callsign CFLR. The station operated at cable 106.7 FM.

In 1996, the station applied to the CRTC for an FM license. The application was granted, and the station began broadcasting over the airwaves at 96.7 MHz in 1997. The station was not able to retain the CFLR callsign, due to the existence of another CFLR broadcasting in La Romaine, Quebec.

Its studios underwent a significant equipment upgrade in 2008. The station added Internet streaming to its website in September 2008.

Initially located in a portable classroom, the station later moved to studios in Laurentian University's Parker Building. In March 2016, it was announced that the CKLU studios would be relocating to the McEwen School of Architecture campus in downtown Sudbury. In September 2016, CKLU 96.7 FM moved to its new location on Elgin Street, inside the McEwen School of Architecture.

== Programming ==
In addition to locally produced programming, the station also airs several syndicated public radio programs, including the Putumayo World Music Hour, Deconstructing Dinner, CIUT-FM's environmental news series The Green Majority, Radio Goethe and Democracy Now!.

Local programming has included Lunch with the Trinnie, which profiles the city's local multicultural communities, City Spins, which features interviews and music by local musicians, All My Friends Radio, and Minotaur Hour, hosted by musician Nathan Lawr. A short-run science series, Sudbury Knows No Bounds, aired in 2008 in conjunction with Science North. Some students from the city's Cambrian College, which does not have its own radio station, also volunteer for CKLU.

Other shows have included Above the Waste, a student based show plays all different types of metal. Miller Time is another student based show that has been running for three years (since 2007), on Monday and Thursday mornings at 7 am and showcases a unique political satire, comedy, and opinion from host Jason Miller. Rhythms of Clublife is a show which features DJ's of House and Trance mixing live over the air, hosted by DJ Phluke Nine on Saturday evenings at 10 PM, giving many listeners and club goers a pumped up attitude while on their way to local venues. Arts at Nine, cohosted by John McHenry of the Sudbury Theatre Centre, is a weekly magazine and interview show that profiles local people in the arts community.

The station also produced The Brent Holland Show, a nationally syndicated interview series.

Since 2018, CKLU-FM had been broadcasting the Sudbury Wolves hockey play-by-play games.
