= CIOI-FM =

Radio station at Mohawk College in Hamilton, Ontario

Coordinates: 43°14′12″N 79°53′12″W

- Hamilton, Ontario; Canada
- Broadcast area: City of Hamilton
- Frequency: 101.5 MHz
- Branding: Indi 101.5

Programming
- Format: campus radio/adult alternative

Ownership
- Owner: Mohawk College Radio Corporation

History
- First air date: 1998
- Call sign meaning: IOI looks like 101

Technical information
- Licensing authority: CRTC
- Class: A1
- ERP: 240 watts
- HAAT: 74.5 metres (244 ft)

Links
- Website: www.indi1015.ca

CIOI-FM is a Canadian radio station, broadcasting at 101.5 FM in Hamilton, Ontario. The license for this campus radio station is held by the Mohawk College Radio Corporation at Mohawk College in Hamilton, Ontario, Canada.

Former logo

CIOI-FM was originally launched in 1975 as CHMR, broadcasting on carrier current and cable FM. On June 6, 1997, the Canadian Radio-television and Telecommunications Commission approved the Mohawk College Radio Corporation's application to operate a new campus instructional FM station. The station launched on FM on March 23, 1998 as C101.5 FM. The station rebranded as INDI 101 in October 2009, corresponding to the huge majority of independent music that the station plays. On January 8, 2014, the station rebranded as "101.5 The Hawk, but eventually changed to the current name "INDI 101.5"

The station operates partly within the curriculum of Mohawk College's Music and Communications Media Programs which include radio broadcasting, broadcast journalism, advertising, television and music. Although any student at the college may volunteer to work at the station, priority is generally given to students who are currently studying in the Broadcasting and Journalism courses. Additionally a number of community members volunteer their time by hosting genre-specific radio programs on INDI 101.5. This combination of student-themed programming coupled with community-based and local-music supported programming allows INDI 101.5 to provide a diversity in broadcasting for the Hamilton Ontario market.

The INDI 101.5 studios are currently located in F wing at Mohawk College within the Department of Music and Communications Media.

CIOI-FM's condition of license is to be an alternative to mainstream radio. The station's basic playlist consists of "non-mainstream" music such as local bands and new music, but also has specialty programming. The station vigorously supports the local Hamilton music environment and produces an annual music festival aimed at promoting local Hamilton music exclusively. This project called the C+C Music Festival is co-produced by fellow campus-community radio station CFMU-FM, located on the campus of McMaster University in Hamilton. Programming at INDI 101.5 consists of independent-style music and a mix of cultural and ethnic broadcasts, and a segment of spoken word and educational programming.
