= CKCU-FM =

Community radio station in Ottawa

Coordinates: 45.3833°N 75.6979°W

- Ottawa, Ontario; Canada
- Broadcast area: National Capital Region
- Frequency: 93.1 MHz
- Branding: CKCU, The Mighty 93.1

Programming
- Format: Campus Radio/community radio

Ownership
- Owner: Radio Carleton Inc.

History
- First air date: 14 November 1975
- Call sign meaning: Carleton University

Technical information
- Licensing authority: CRTC
- Class: B
- ERP: 12 kW
- HAAT: 262.5 metres (861 ft)

Links
- Website: www.ckcufm.com

CKCU-FM is a Canadian campus-based community radio station, broadcasting at 93.1 FM in Ottawa and www.ckcufm.com, and offering live and archived on-demand audio streams from its website. The station broadcasts 24 hours per day, 365 days per year.

The station's studios are located on the campus of Carleton University, on the fifth floor of the Nideyinàn building (formerly University Centre). The station's signal is radiated from the Ryan Tower in the Gatineau Hills, along with most of Ottawa's other private and public radio stations, meaning that it enjoys full broadcast power and a listening area with a radius of 100 km.

== History ==
On May 22, 1973, Carleton University Association Inc. was granted a licence from the CRTC to operate a carrier current AM station, operating on 670 kHz with power of only 16 watts. Its first broadcast on 93.1 FM was on November 14, 1975, when it played Joni Mitchell's You Turn Me On, I'm a Radio. CKCU broadcasts live 24 hours a day to a 100 km radius on FM 93.1.

CKCU airs over 100 different shows each week, including programs in 14 languages. The schedule includes both general and specialty music programs, public affairs and spoken word programming, and features many shows with a topical or international flavour. Some shows feature live in-studio performances by local artists. CKCU actively supports, sponsors and promotes local independent musicians, venues, concerts and festivals.

Volunteers from the campus and community program and host all shows. Often dubbed the mighty 93 by devotees, CKCU has a freeform format that allows the hosts to pick all the music played, and has community programs.

The listener-supported station has an annual funding drive in late October and early November to raise money for its annual operating budget. In 2025, this raised over $190,000. The station also raises money through university student levies, along with revenue from advertisers and sponsors. The station self-produces much of the advertising material it carries, giving the advertising a campus flavour popular with listeners.

Each March break and several times during the summer, CKCU runs a unique Radio Camp for kids ages 10–14. The camp has been growing in popularity since 2001 and features a live two-hour kids broadcast.

CKCU-FM was included amongst other architecturally interesting and historically significant buildings in Doors Open Ottawa.

On July 3, 2020, a construction mishap knocked down the tower at CKCU-FM's building. The mishap severed the link between the studio and the transmitter site rendering the station silent. The station was back on the air a month later. In the interim CKCU-FM audio was available to listen online over the internet.

In November 2025, CKCU-FM celebrated its 50th anniversary.

== Famous alums ==
- Ian Mendes
- James Duthie
- Jeremy Gara
- Ken Rockburn
- David Mowbray
- Jeff Green
- Jason Moscovitz
- Rob Braide
- Geoff Pevere
- Chuck Rubin
- Neil Bregman
- Max Wallace
- Adrian Harewood
- Mike Ross
- John Marshall
- Michael Giunta
- Nadine Gelineau
- Casey Kenny
- Derek Diorio
- Jim Wright
