= CFRU-FM =

Radio station at the University of Guelph in Canada

- Guelph, Ontario; Canada
- Frequency: 93.3 MHz
- Branding: CFRU 93.3 FM

Programming
- Format: Campus/Community radio

Ownership
- Owner: University of Guelph; (University of Guelph Radio - Radio Gryphon)

History
- Founded: 1969 as Radio Gryphon
- First air date: 1973
- Call sign meaning: Frank Ryan U (after founding donor)

Technical information
- Class: A1
- ERP: 250 watts
- HAAT: 53.8 metres (177 ft)

Links
- Website: cfru.ca

CFRU-FM, airing at 93.3 on the FM dial, is a campus radio station based at the University of Guelph in Guelph, Ontario, Canada. CFRU is a volunteer-run campus and community radio station. CFRU is a member of the National Campus and Community Radio Association. The station hosted the 2005 national conference of that organization.

== History ==
Radio at the University of Guelph has a long history dating back to 1939 when there was a credit course in radio broadcasting offered by the Ontario Agricultural College. Radio curriculum was taught at the University of Guelph until the late 1950s.

Throughout the late 1950s and early 1960s various colleges at the University of Guelph produced a half-hour radio program for CJOY in a sound booth in the Massey Hall drama practice theatre.

In 1965, broadcast executive Frank Ryan, a former member of the university's Board of Governors, bequeathed the university $25,000 in his will to launch its own radio station.

In 1969, Room 102 of the Physical Sciences Building became a radio studio as Radio Gryphon began regular programming to cafeterias and student lounges through a closed circuit system. CJOY programming discontinued.

In September 1970, Radio Gryphon experimented with on-campus AM broadcasting and Radio Gryphon was added to Guelph cable FM system (105.7 FM). In November 1970 the Department of Communications shut down Radio Gryphon for operating a radio broadcasting station without a licence.

In 1973, CFRU was awarded an AM licence to broadcast on campus at 820 kHz. In 1974 CFRU moved into new studios in the University Centre. CFRU was the first group to move into the new University Centre.

It moved to its current FM frequency in 1980, broadcasting a 50 watt signal until 1991. In that year, the station expanded its signal to 250 watts, enabling it to reach the Kitchener-Waterloo region. In 2005 CFRU celebrated 25 years as an FM broadcaster in Canada with a series of concerts and community events.

On April 24, 2008 CFRU began broadcasting in a newly revamped on-air studio, updating the technological operations of the station to provide better and smoother programming.

== Programming ==
CFRU offers a wide range of programming including an eclectic mix of music shows, alternative and international news shows, spoken word shows, and foreign language programming.

CFRU broadcasts in English, Spanish, Mandarin, Cantonese, Turkish, Polish, Persian, and Dari. CFRU's music programs feature a variety of musical genres including hip-hop, punk, metal, salsa, drum and bass and reggae. Overall it plays a wide variety of Canadian and independent music.

CFRU holds its annual membership drive, Raise Your Voice, in October.

== See also ==
- Campus radio
