= National Campus and Community Radio Association =

Canadian radio nonprofit

The National Campus and Community Radio Association/L'Association nationale des radios étudiantes et communautaires (NCRA/ANREC) is a non-profit organization of campus radio and community radio stations in Canada.

It represents the interests of the sector to government (particularly the Canadian Radio-television and Telecommunications Commission (CRTC)) and other agencies, and promotes community radio in Canada. Since 1981, it has helped lower tariffs affecting radio stations and assisted new stations to launch, as well as to obtain operating funds. Core initiatives include GroundWire, Dig Your Roots, !earshot, Women’s Hands and Voices, the Community Radio Fund of Canada, sector-wide mailing lists, and an annual radio conference.

The head office of the NCRA/ANREC is located in Ottawa. A majority of English-language campus and community radio stations in Canada are members of the NCRA.

== History ==
In February 1981, the first National Campus Radio Conference (NCRC) was held in Ottawa, hosted by CKCU. At that conference, the National Campus/Community Radio Organization (NCRO) was formed to promote campus radio across Canada. In August 1983, NCRC delegates voted to formalize the structure of the NCRO further and to establish a volunteer office to carry out a variety of services for member stations. The office initially operated from CKCU-FM, at Carleton University in Ottawa. That year the Alternative Radio News Service, a regular mailout of alternative news and information to campus and community stations, was started at CKMS-FM at the University of Waterloo.

In the early years, the NCRO published a monthly newsletter and alternative album chart. It also made presentations to the CRTC on a number of issues relating to community radio in Canada, including efforts to reduce content restrictions the CRTC had placed on the limited form of commercial advertising allowed on campus and community stations at the time. The organization was also actively involved in assisting the growing number of campus-based radio groups applying for FM radio licenses in the early 1980s.

In July 1986 the NCRO was incorporated as the National Campus and Community Radio Association Inc./L'Association nationale de radios étudiantes et communautaires Inc. (NCRA/ANREC). In the early 1990s, there was a national office and executive director for a short period of time, but due to lack of stable funding, among other problems, the office closed after less than one year. In February 2002, a new office was formed in Montreal with a national coordinator, which moved to Ottawa in May 2005, where it currently operates.

== Chart and !earshot ==
The Canadian music magazine Chart was founded as an internal NCRA/ANREC publication; when it incorporated as an independent newsstand title, the NCRA began publishing !earshot, which is a regular supplement in Exclaim!. Many campus and community radio stations continue to file airplay charts with both publications.

== Dig Your Roots ==
In 2001, after Corus Entertainment, a major broadcasting company in Canada, bought out a number of radio stations across Canada, as per federal regulations the CRTC required that they put a total of 6% of the assets from this transfer of ownership towards artist development. The money was given by Corus Entertainment to the NCRA/ANREC to start up and maintain the Dig Your Roots/Découvre tes racines project, a series of genre-specific compilation albums that coincided with live concert simulcast broadcasts. Dig Your Roots concluded in 2007.

== National Campus and Community Radio Conference ==
The NCRC is an annual national gathering of community-oriented radio broadcasters. It has been offered every summer since 1981, and it is one of the core activities of the NCRA/ANREC. It is usually hosted by a different radio station in different locations each year. During the conference, delegates attend workshops, seminars, the annual general meeting of the NCRA (during which board members are elected, the treasurer's report is approved, the business of the association is accomplished by the membership, and the next conference's host radio station selected), seminars, live shows, and feature presentations.

== National Women in Radio Conference ==
Up until 2012, a Women in Radio Conference was held during the national conference. This was replaced with the Equity Radio Day to be held on a weekend during the conference.

=== Conferences ===
- 1981 CKCU - Ottawa, ON
- 1983 In conjunction with first AMARC conference, Montreal, QC
- 1984 CITR – Vancouver, BC
- 1985 CHSR – Fredericton, NB
- 1986 CJSW – Calgary, AB
- 1987 CKLN – Toronto, ON
- 1988 CKDU – Halifax, NS
- 1989 CFUV – Victoria, BC
- 1990 CJSW – Calgary, AB
- 1991 CKUT – Montreal, QC
- 1992 CITR – Vancouver, BC
- 1993 CFLR – Sudbury, ON
- 1994 CHSR – Fredericton, NB
- 1995 CJSR – Edmonton, AB
- 1996 CFMU – Hamilton, ON
- 1997 CIUT – Toronto, ON
- 1998 CFUV – Victoria, BC
- 1999 CKDU – Halifax, NS
- 2000 CKUW – Winnipeg, MB
- 2001 CHUO – Ottawa, ON
- 2002 CFMH – Saint John, NB
- 2003 CKUW – Winnipeg, MB
- 2004 CJSR – Edmonton, AB
- 2005 CFRU – Guelph, ON
- 2006 NCRA/ANREC – Ottawa, ON
- 2007 CITR – Vancouver, BC
- 2008 CJAM – Windsor, ON
- 2009 CKUT - Montreal, QC
- 2010 CKGI - Gabriola Community Radio - Gabriola Island, BC
- 2011 CKDU - Halifax, Nova Scotia
- 2012 CFRC - Kingston, Ontario
- 2013 CKUW - Winnipeg, MB
- 2014 CFUV - Victoria, BC
- 2015 CFMH - Saint John, NB
- 2016 CHUO - Ottawa, ON
- 2017 CIVL - Abbotsford, BC

== See also ==
- List of campus radio stations in Canada
- List of community radio stations in Canada
