= CJSR-FM =

Radio station in Edmonton, Alberta

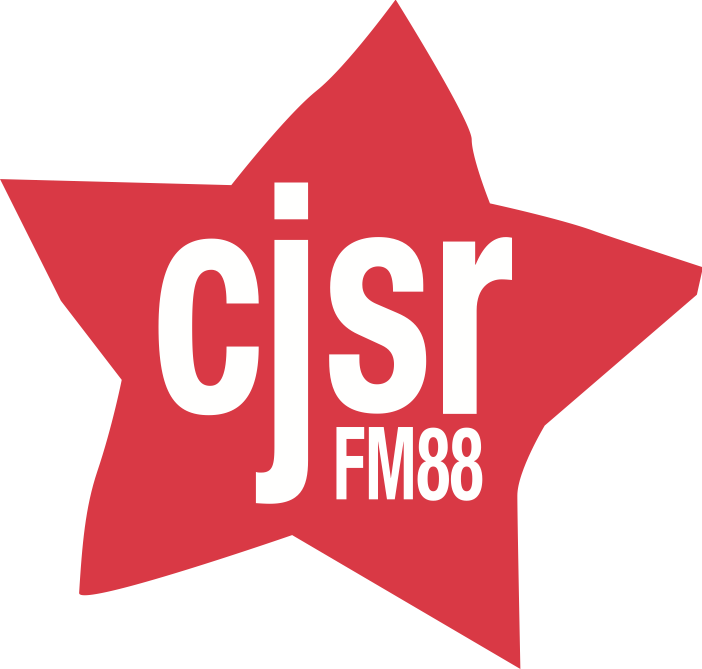
- Edmonton, Alberta; Canada
- Broadcast area: Edmonton Metropolitan Region
- Frequency: 88.5 MHz
- Branding: CJSR FM 88

Programming
- Format: Campus radio

Ownership
- Owner: First Alberta Campus Radio Association

History
- First air date: January 7, 1984

Technical information
- Class: A
- ERP: 900 watts
- HAAT: 52 metres (171 ft)
- Transmitter coordinates: 53°31′39.9″N 113°31′21.0″W

Links
- Webcast: Listen Live
- Website: www.cjsr.com

CJSR-FM (CJSR FM 88) is a Canadian campus-based community radio station, broadcasting at 88.5 FM in Edmonton, Alberta. The CJSR studios are located in the Students' Union Building of the University of Alberta, while its transmitter is located atop the building.

CJSR is a volunteer-run campus and community radio station with a stated mission, "to enlighten and entertain our audience through high quality and diverse programming that constantly challenges the status quo".

== Programming ==
CJSR plays a diverse range of musical genres and spoken-word programming. The station is home to nationally syndicated shows like Terra Informa. It was the home of the early version of Science for the People (podcast).

Another notable program is GayWire, "Edmonton's only radio program dedicated to shedding light on, and discussing queer and trans news, events and issues in Canada and around the world." GayWire has been a part of CJSR since the 1980s, and was rebooted in 2021 "through a CJSR Podcast Bootcamp, with the support of the Community Radio Fund of Canada". The 2022 episode "Can I get a GSA with that?" by Shayne Giles won a Community Radio Award In Broadcasting And Online (CRABO).

=== Programing Requirements ===
CJSR is subject to the Canadian Radio-television and Telecommunications Commission's requirements for community-based campus stations which means, among other things, that:

- 25% of its programming must be spoken-word programming
- no more than 10% of the music it broadcasts can be "hit" music (as defined by the CRTC)
- 35% of the music it broadcasts must be "Canadian content" (as defined by the CRTC)

CJSR operates a 900-watt transmitter, broadcasting throughout Edmonton, Alberta, and the surrounding area. Since 2000, the station's broadcasts have also been available via streaming audio.

== Governance ==
CJSR's broadcast license is held by the First Alberta Campus Radio Association (FACRA), which is funded by a mix of fees assessed to students at the University of Alberta (under the auspices of the taxation powers of the University of Alberta Students' Union and the Graduate Students' Association), donations from listeners, and limited advertising revenue. In 2005, FACRA became a registered charity.

The station is also a member of the National Campus and Community Radio Association.

== History ==
CJSR has its roots in the Alberta Student Radio Directorate (later known as the Radio Society) which started in 1946 when CKUA left the campus. By 1967, closed circuit Radio Society broadcasts were heard at various buildings on the U of A campus. In 1970, CKSR was born: a "seat of the pants" radio station that broadcast a weak FM signal to the U of A and anyone else who could pick it up. CKSR eventually became CJSR in 1978.

FACRA was formed as a partnership between the University of Alberta Students' Union (which collected a levy from students on the station's behalf) and the Friends of CJSR Society (which solicited listener donations and which held the station's capital assets). In 2002, the latter entity was disbanded over concerns of overlapping jurisdiction and because a legal opinion stated that having the station's capital assets held by an entity other than the one holding the broadcast license and employing staff would be unlikely to protect those assets in the event of a lawsuit, and its assets transferred to FACRA.

CJSR became a full broadcast station in 1984.

== Awards ==
In 2014, CJSR was recognized at the Edmonton Mayor's Celebration for the Arts with the John Poole Award for Promotion of the Arts. CJSR programming has also received awards from the National Campus and Community Radio Association for Current Affairs or Magazine Show, Documentary, News, Syndicated Show or Podcast, Creative Production, Special Programming, and Sports Talk Show Programming.
