= Dig Your Roots (compilation albums) =

Compilation album
- Released: 2003–2007
- Genres: Hip hop, spoken word, electronic dance, roots, Canadian aboriginal, experimental jazz
- Label: National Campus and Community Radio Association

Dig Your Roots/Découvre tes racines is a Canadian series of compilation albums, released by the National Campus and Community Radio Association (NCRA/ANREC) in the 2000s to promote new and emerging artists. The project was launched in 2002, utilizing development funding that Corus Entertainment provided to the NCRA/ANREC as part of a benefits package relating to a major radio acquisition transaction.

Each year's Dig Your Roots compilation focused on a particular genre of music. Submissions were judged by a panel that first chose up to 100 artists to be featured through streaming audio on the project's website. It then chose the 15 best entries for the CD compilation. The albums were also promoted by a series of live concert broadcasts which aired on participating campus and community radio stations across Canada.

== Project 1: Hip Hop (2003) ==
The first album, released in 2003, featured unsigned hip hop artists. The five associated concert shows were held on March 17 in Surrey, British Columbia; March 20 in Winnipeg, Manitoba; March 23 in Toronto, Ontario; March 26 in Montreal, Quebec; and March 29 in Halifax, Nova Scotia.

In Exclaim!'s review of the album, critic Thomas Quinlan called it "the greatest Canadian hip-hop compilation since Cold Front", claiming that it had corrected "the mistakes of Rap Essentials."

1. Vandal (Toronto) – Urban Camper (3:51)
2. First Words featuring Cess (Rothesay) – Down With Putting Raps Down (3:51)
3. Wyzah (Montreal) – Three Angels (3:42)
4. The Goods (Halifax) – Monkey Motion Shuffle (2:52)
5. War Party (Hobbema) – Feeling Reserved (3:26)
6. Illa Brown/Kutcorners (Vancouver) – Rock On Ya Block (3:37)
7. Classified (Halifax) – Unexpected (3:49)
8. Dangerous Goods Collective (Edmonton) – No More Nice Guy (4:10)
9. Kamau (Toronto) – Brain Storming (2:04)
10. Frek Sho (Winnipeg) – Fort Rouge (2:42)
11. Les Architekts (Montreal) – le diable joue un jeu (4:45) ^{1}
12. Half Life (Montreal) – Secrets of Society (4:45)
13. Ink Operated (Surrey) – Chant It Ooh Ah Oh (3:06)
14. Josh Martinez (Vancouver) – Another Day (4:10)
15. Eye + Eye (Toronto) – Snapshots (5:52)

=== Notes ===
^{1} Due to manufacturer error, another song, Anodajay's "Le détenu", was mistakenly substituted on the CD for this one. Dig Your Roots subsequently released a special three-song sampler of Les Architekts' songs to compensate for the error.

== Project 2: Spoken Word (2004) ==
The second album, one of two released in 2004, focused on spoken word poetry and storytelling.

1. Steph Berntson (Sackville) – Barreling Madly (2:07)
2. Kevin Matthews (Winnipeg) – Arsenic and Boldface (3:05)
3. Derek Bradford (Halifax) – I Spy (1:53)
4. Ève Langevin (Montreal) – Bulletin de nouvelles en bref, version 1 (1:09)
5. Gein Wong (Toronto) – A Paper Son (2:35)
6. Khyro (Montreal) – Fragment de Réflection du Mirroir 2: Forêt Vierge (1:55)
7. Jeremy Gorman (Fredericton) – Pussycat Pussycat (1:29)
8. Barbara Adler (Coquitlam) – In the Time Before (3:50)
9. Nico Rogers (Winnipeg) – Hard to choke your artichoke heart (1:22)
10. Julie Parrell (Winnipeg) – Untitled (2:23)
11. Odessa Thornhill (Montreal) – I Sold My Wealth (1:02)
12. T.L. Cowan (Edmonton) – homebody/homegirl (4:40)
13. Heather Majaury (Waterloo) – Mother’s Song (4:25)
14. Janet Marie Rogers (Victoria) – Make Me / Sombrio Spirit (4:18)
15. Unblind (North York) – Mythology (1:43)

== Project 3: Electronic Dance (2004) ==
The third album, also released in 2004 simultaneously with the spoken word album, focused on electronic music.

1. Alexandre (La Butte) – Qu'elle a dit (3:58)
2. D_MON (Dartmouth) – Don't Listen (3:51)
3. Chinese Jetpilot (London) – Return of the Phat Dragon (DYR Edit) (3:28)
4. Blackjwell (Montreal) – Falls (4:38)
5. East Coast Disaster Complex (Victoria) – Robbiemart (3:38)
6. Balboa (Winnipeg) – Ballad of the Lonely Mogwai (3:56)
7. Alucard (Winnipeg) – Triple Wave (edit) (4:27)
8. DĀV (Montreal) – Parisian Dream (4:31)
9. d*rogers (Ottawa) – Did 2 Much (Grooveboy Remix) (4:46)
10. Big Phat McNasty (Kamloops) – Rogue State (4:15)
11. Gary Flanagan (Rothesay) – Driver (3:16)
12. DJ Oxide (Winnipeg) – Sundae (4:05)
13. Zenobia Salik & the United ElectroSoul Underground (Vancouver) – Headphones (Vegas Lounge Mix) (5:04)
14. Guru-shishya (Hamilton) – Cagian 3 (3:56)
15. vitaminsforyou (Montreal) – quand peanut fait dodo (3:24)

== Project 4: Roots (2005) ==
The 2005 album centred on roots music artists.

1. The Cracker Cats (Saskatoon) –Darkness (2:45)
2. D. Rangers (Winnipeg) – Coughin Up Blood (2:55)
3. Paul Paulin (St. Joseph du Lac) – J'ai pas n'cent su moé (3:47)
4. Anne Louise Genest (Whitehorse) – Paradise Road (3:38)
5. John Wort Hannam (Fort Macleod) – Church of the Long Grass (4:06)
6. Penny Lang (Montreal) – Prairie Sky (3:08)
7. Jory Nash (Willowdale) – Citizen's Waltz (3:49)
8. Glen Reid (Burk's Falls) – Lifeline to the Heartland (4:04)
9. The Flummies (Happy Valley - Goose Bay) – Comb Your Hair Flat Down (3:06)
10. Les Chauffeurs à pieds (Québec) – Marie la chamelle & reel du poteau blanc (5:31)
11. Barley Wik (Victoria) – View of the Station (2:23)
12. Jane Eamon (Kelowna) – Ruckus in the Henhouse (4:26)
13. Tim Harrison (Toronto) – Elizabeth's Lament (3:38)
14. Petunia (Fredericton) – The Lonesome Pine Hollows (3:56)
15. Rob Currie (Halifax) – Rape of Grand Pré (3:23)

== Project 5: Aboriginal (2006) ==
The 2006 album focused on aboriginal music by First Nations, Métis and Inuit artists.

1. Sandy Scofield (Vancouver BC) – Faith (feat. Kinnie Starr) (4:49)
2. Shirley Montague (Norris Point NL) – Ijiatsuk (3:54)
3. The Pappy Johns Band with Murray Porter (Ohsweken ON) – Going Back (5:02)
4. Elaine Jakesta (Watson Lake YT) – Healed Heroes (2:20)
5. Ed Peekeekoot (Crofton BC) – Wild Lilies to Wheat Fields (3:12)
6. Jef Tremblay et les Éléments (Québec QC) – Tanite Etuteiak (3:48)
7. X-STATUS (Winnipeg MB) – Still Around (2:55)
8. Sinuupa (Kuujjuag QC) – Simple Man (Explicit Language) (4:46)
9. Eekwol (Saskatoon SK) – Too Sick (4:15)
10. Tagaq (Cambridge Bay NU) – Breather (5:27)
11. Rez Villain (Bedford NS) – Charismatic Manner (Explicit Language) (3:45)
12. Leela Gilday (Yellowknife NT) – Rage (4:12)
13. Richard M. Gloade (Fredericton NB) – The Mean Song (3:11)
14. Graeme Jonez (Toronto ON) – Black Magic Goldmine (3:18)
15. Digging Roots (Barrie ON) – Going Back (4:48)

== Project 6: Experimental Jazz (2007) ==
The 2007 album featured experimental jazz artists.

1. Georges Koufogiannakis, "Yo, Mo D." (5:05)
2. TFC, "Acting on the Assumption" (4:48)
3. Colin Fisher, "Zig Zag" (6:05)
4. Bitchin, "2005-05-27 08:13:55" (6:43)
5. Duane Andrews, "Improvisations on the First Movement of Mozart's String Quintet in G Minor K516" (2:49)
6. Avi Granite: 6, "Ghetto Panda" (7:13)
7. Inhabitants, "Main Drag" (5:11)
8. UniSecs, "À Travers" (5:16)
9. Gordon Grdina's Box Cutter, "Tidal Wave" (5:37)
10. The Barriomatic Trust, "The Ruined Map" (3:29)
11. The Beni D Band, "Walk'n' the Ave" (5:11)
12. Sons of Colborne, "Up v. Down" (4:25)
13. Jesse Zubot, "Nootropics" (4:23)
14. BoboK (2), "Erroné" (4:03)
15. Tyler Hornby, "Shadows of a Brighter Day" (5:18)
