= CKMS-FM =

Community radio station in Waterloo, Ontario

Coordinates: 43°29′00″N 80°32′44″W

- Waterloo, Ontario; Canada
- Broadcast area: Waterloo Region
- Frequency: 102.7 MHz
- Branding: Radio Waterloo

Programming
- Format: Community radio/adult album alternative

Ownership
- Owner: Radio Waterloo Inc.

History
- First air date: 1977
- Former frequencies: 94.5 MHz (1977–1992); 100.3 MHz (1992–2016)

Technical information
- Class: A1
- ERP: 250 watts
- HAAT: 27 metres (89 ft)

Links
- Website: radiowaterloo.ca

CKMS-FM (branded as Radio Waterloo) is a Canadian community radio station, broadcasting at 102.7 FM in Waterloo, Ontario.

== History ==
The station launched in 1977 at 94.5 FM as the campus radio station of the University of Waterloo, and moved to 100.3 in 1992 where it has been broadcasting from at least 6 am until midnight. During this time the Federation of Students promised to provide perpetual funding at $40,000 per year. The station moved to its current frequency (102.7) in 2015.

CKMS plays a variety of genres both in English and other languages, so as to provide the campus and community with music that may not otherwise be accessible on air from mainstream venues. The station's programmers are all volunteers from the Kitchener-Waterloo community and students at the University of Waterloo. The station also contains UW Alumni who were programmers during their time at UW and stayed on after graduation, in addition to those who were interested in radio but never found the time to host a show while they were studying for their degree.

The station is governed by a board of directors made up of community members.

=== The Referendums ===
Historically, 90% of CKMS's funding came from UW's undergraduate students, via a refundable charge on students' bill statements ($5.50 per term until the end of the 2007-2008 school year), levied through the university's Federation of Students, ("Feds"). In February 2008, a student referendum initiated by Student Council was passed by Feds by approx. 2:1 margin to remove the fee, and funding ceased on September 1, 2008.

Following the referendum, the station rebranded as SoundFM, continuing operations with community and individual students support, and the consent of the university and Feds to remain in its existing studios while it worked to revamp its operations. Five of the seven staff members took a voluntary layoff in June 2009, with the Board of Directors and select volunteers taking over operations.

Following the November 2009 referendum, with 18% of eligible voters participating, students voted 2460 to 2005 against reinstating the station's funding at $2.50 per student. The announcement of the referendum results on November 13 led the station to change the locks of its studios and switch temporarily to a full-time rebroadcast of the BBC World Service, pending a final decision on its future. Regular programming resumed on the 16th in order to allow station management to examine other means of continuing broadcasts.

A few weeks later, CKMS announced it would move its studios to the upper level of Maxwell's Music House, a multipurpose music facility near the university, as of mid-January 2010. Since that time, the station has operated in part as a co-operative, while continuing to provide quality programming for students and the community at large, under the bylaws approved in 2008. Due to funding issues Sound was required to leave Maxwell's Music House.

=== 2011 ===
Sound moved to 142 Waterloo St. in late 2011, and restarted live broadcast once the station was in order. The Station is still run by interested students and community members, and is funded through the Co-Op Member Fees, Programmer Fees, and fund raising activities, such as past grants from GO's. They currently receive no funding or support from the University of Waterloo or Feds.

=== 2015 ===
On August 3, 2015, Radio Waterloo Inc., submitted an application to change CKMS's frequency from 100.3 MHz to 102.7 MHz. The CRTC approved Radio Waterloo's application to change CKMS-FM's frequency from 100.3 MHz to 102.7 MHz on November 10, 2016.
