= CHSR-FM =

Radio station in Fredericton, New Brunswick

Coordinates: 45°56′42.78″N 66°38′29.43″W

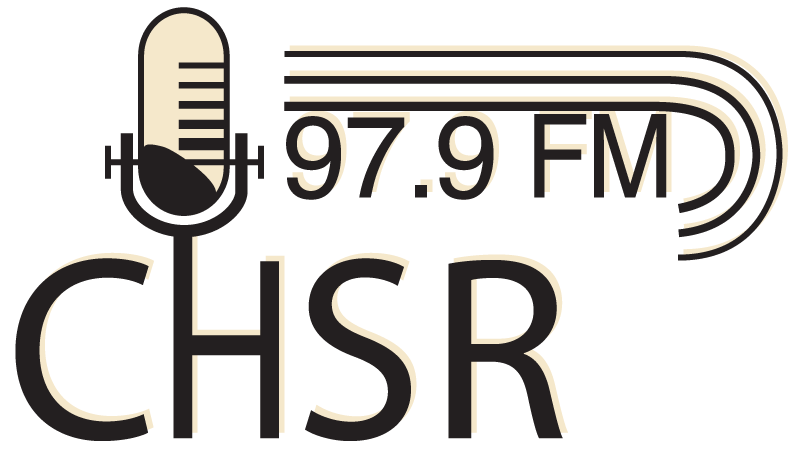
- Fredericton, New Brunswick; Canada
- Broadcast area: Greater Fredericton
- Frequency: 97.9 MHz
- Branding: CHSR 97.9 FM

Programming
- Format: campus/community

Ownership
- Owner: CHSR Broadcasting Inc.

History
- First air date: January 22, 1961
- Call sign meaning: College Hill Student Radio

Technical information
- ERP: 250 watts
- HAAT: 48 metres (157 ft)

Links
- Website: chsrfm.ca

CHSR-FM is a campus-licensed radio station in Fredericton, New Brunswick, Canada. The station has an effective radiated power of 250 watts. The broadcast signal is also streamed live on the internet.

Most of its members are students at the University of New Brunswick and St. Thomas University, however, it has many non-student volunteers. Its broadcast studio and record library are located in the Student Union Building (the SUB) which is shared by the two institutions.

== History ==
The organization now known as CHSR was founded in the late 1950s, and officially went on-air January 22, 1961 as Radio UNB. It is one of the oldest community radio stations in Atlantic Canada and boasts the largest music library east of Montreal, although Fredericton is much smaller than other communities in the Atlantic Region. The library holds a large variety of musical genres, on a variety of formats (vinyl, cassettes, compact discs, etc.) from the past six decades.

Like many student media organizations, the relationship with various university, student and community leaders were occasionally strained. One of the more persistent sources of disputes was largely resolved with an agreement signed in 1999, which stabilized CHSR's largest source of funding: undergraduate students at the University of New Brunswick. The new agreement requires a signed petition and a referendum to change or remove the media fee, whereas previously funding could be (and once was) removed by a simple motion of Student Union Council.

As a community radio station housed on a university campus, CHSR makes an extra effort to reach out to the off-campus community, playing local content and providing on-site training for new DJs who later are able to host their own show.

A founding member of the national community broadcasters collective, the National Campus and Community Radio Association, CHSR remains an active member of the alternative media, including participation in the NCRA's Dig Your Roots project. CHSR is also a voting member of the World Association of Community Radio Broadcasters and the Grassroots Radio Coalition.

== Notable shows ==
- "The Crazy Train" was Atlantic Canada's longest running Heavy Metal radio program. It won CHSR's "Barry Award" for Best Specialty Music program in 1994, during the 5-year span when it was hosted by Jason Shipley.
- According with Carmen was a long-running show featuring "the best in old Country, Pop, Bajan, Cajun, Irish, Newfoundland and other Island music." Host Carmen Kilburn, 2006 inductee to the New Brunswick Country Music Hall of Fame welcomed live guests and special requests.
- Diversions is a long-running show of classical and opera music. Hosted by Dr. Adrian Park, this program celebrated its 20th anniversary in April 2010.
- "More Of What You Like With The Mistress" was the first Hip Hop show to air in Fredericton with a top ten list published in Billboard. The show, hosted by Mindy Crawford, aired from 1989 - 1994 and paved the way for Hip Hop Artist to begin performances in the Maritimes.
- Strictly HipHop is a long-running show, 90 minutes of funky beat mix, hosted by DJ STV. This program celebrated its 20th anniversary in 2013.
- Testing For Echo is a recent show, with its first episode airing June 25, 2022. Hosted by Tim Scammell, it started out as an homage to the Canadian Trio RUSH and progressive rock such as King Crimson, Yes, Saga, Nightwinds, Genesis to name a few. It has evolved to encompass many more styles and genres as the host sees fit. It airs on Saturday afternoons at 3:00 p.m. and Tuesday mornings at 7:00 a.m. The show is recorded and new episodes air every other week with alternating weeks playing Testing For Echo - Replay of past episodes. The show was a winner of the 2024 Barry Award for Most Streamed Online show on CHSR.

== Logos ==
Former CHSR Logo
