= Closed-circuit radio =

Radio that emits over a very small range

A closed-circuit radio is similar to traditional radio communication, though its signal is sent via pre-laid speaker wires or utility lines. It has a very limited range, typically within a building or a college campus.

- An existing PA System may be used to send the audio signal. This method is typically applied in schools, such as by permitting students to use a central microphone to deliver daily announcements.
- Existing power lines, telephone lines, pipes, etc. can transmit a carrier current. Radio receivers at close range may then tune to the signal emitted from the utility line.
