= Central station (Edmonton) =

Light rail station in Edmonton, Alberta, Canada

Central
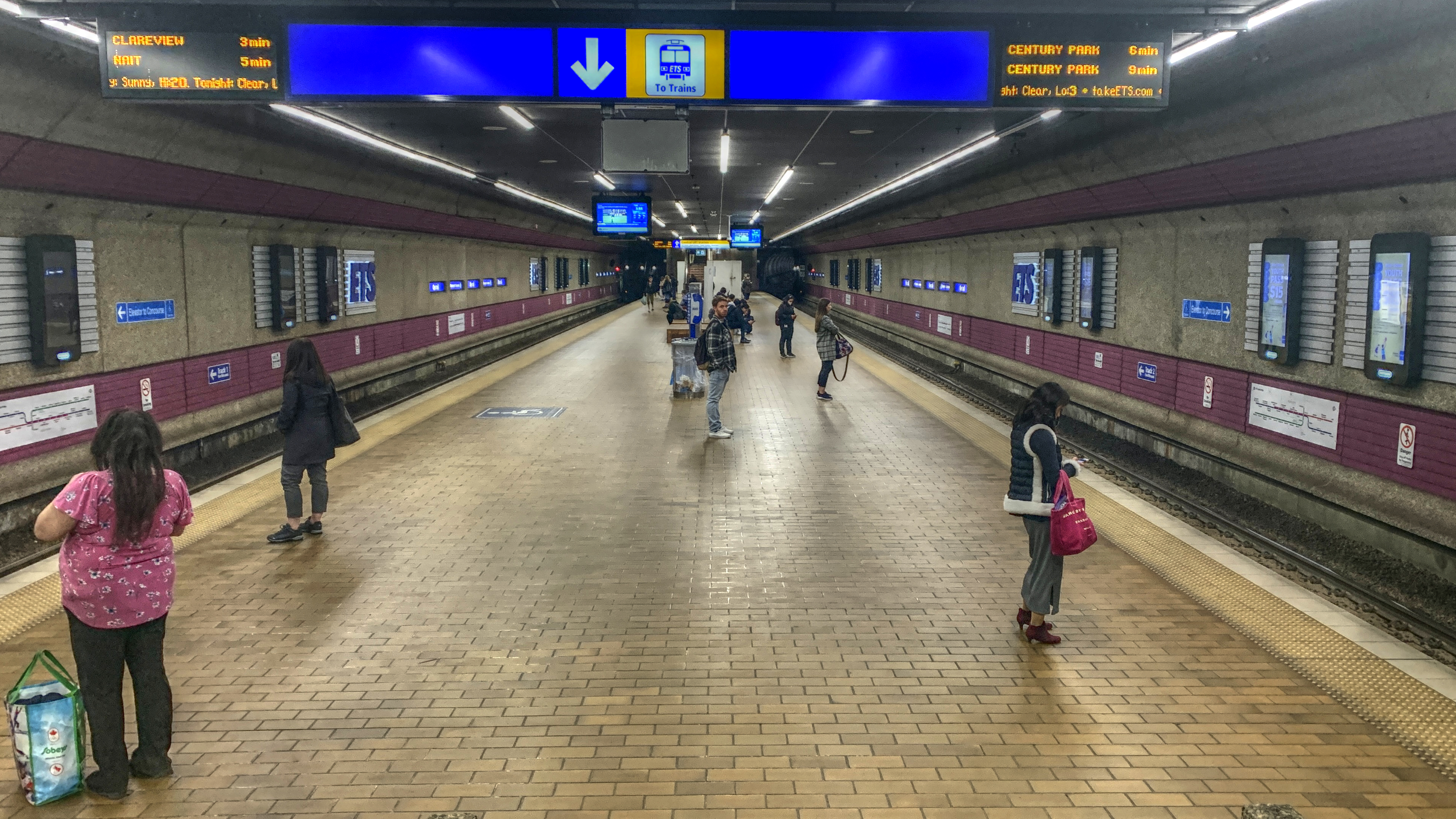

General information
- Coordinates: 53°32′28″N 113°29′31″W
- Owner: City of Edmonton
- Platforms: Centre
- Tracks: 2

Construction
- Structure type: Underground
- Accessible: Yes

Other information
- Website: Central LRT Station

History
- Opened: 1978
- Electrified: 600 V DC

Passengers
- 2019 (typical weekday): 6,241 board 6,124 alight 12,365 Total

Services
Preceding station	Edmonton LRT	Following station
Churchill toward Clareview	Capital Line	Bay/Enterprise Square toward Century Park
Churchill toward NAIT/Blatchford Market	Metro Line	Bay/Enterprise Square toward Health Sciences/Jubilee
Route map
Key
Location

Central Station is an Edmonton LRT station in Edmonton, Alberta, Canada. It serves both the Capital Line and the Metro Line. It is an underground station located beneath Jasper Avenue between 100 Street and 101 Street.

== History ==
Central LRT Station was one of five original stations when the line opened on April 22, 1978. When the LRT first opened, Central Station was the original southern terminus.

ETS once operated a Transit Information kiosk above the station at 100A Street and Jasper Avenue; however, it has since been relocated to the Edmonton Tower. The building now serves as an entrance for users requiring an elevator to get to the station platform.

Rehabilitation of the station, which included repairs to the roof structure and waterproofing, began in April 2012 and was completed in 2014 at a cost of $21.2 million.

== Station layout ==
The station has a 125-metre-long (410 ft) centre loading platform that can accommodate two five-car LRT trains simultaneously, with one train on each side of the platform. At just under 8 m wide (26 ft), the platform is narrow by current Edmonton LRT design guidelines. The platform is accessible from the concourse level by stairs and escalators at each end. The concourse level is part of the Edmonton pedway system.

From the station at the concourse level, there is direct underground access to ATB Place, Rice Howard Place, and Commerce Place.

The station includes a mural installed to celebrate the twentieth anniversary of Edmonton's LRT system.

== Around the station ==
- Commerce Place
- Downtown
- Edmonton House
- Enbridge Centre
- Hotel Macdonald
- Manulife Place
- McLeod Building
- Rice Howard Place
- ATB Place
