= Rice Howard Place =

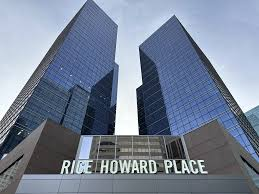
- Rice Howard Place complex
- Interactive map of the Rice Howard Place area
- Former names: Scotia Place

General information
- Status: Completed
- Type: Office
- Architectural style: Modernism
- Location: Edmonton, Alberta
- Coordinates: 53°32′30″N 113°29′34″W
- Construction started: Rice Howard 1: 1980; Rice Howard 2: 1982
- Completed: Rice Howard 1: 1982; Rice Howard 2: 1983
- Owner: Morguard (20%)

Height
- Roof: Rice Howard 1: 113 m (371 ft); Rice Howard 2: 88 m (289 ft)

Technical details
- Floor count: Rice Howard 1: 28; Rice Howard 2: 21

Design and construction
- Architect: B. James Wensley Architect

Rice Howard Place (originally Scotia Place) is an office tower complex in Edmonton, Alberta, Canada, that was completed in 1983. It is located at 10060 Jasper Avenue in Downtown Edmonton. It is home to several long-term tenants such as Grant Thornton, APEGA, Ernst & Young, Chadi & Company, Imperial Equities, Duncan Craig LLP and Edmonton Transit. The namesake of the complex was Scotiabank, but it was renamed Rice Howard Place in April 2022 after the anchor tenant, Scotiabank, moved to the new Stantec Tower at 10220 103 Ave.

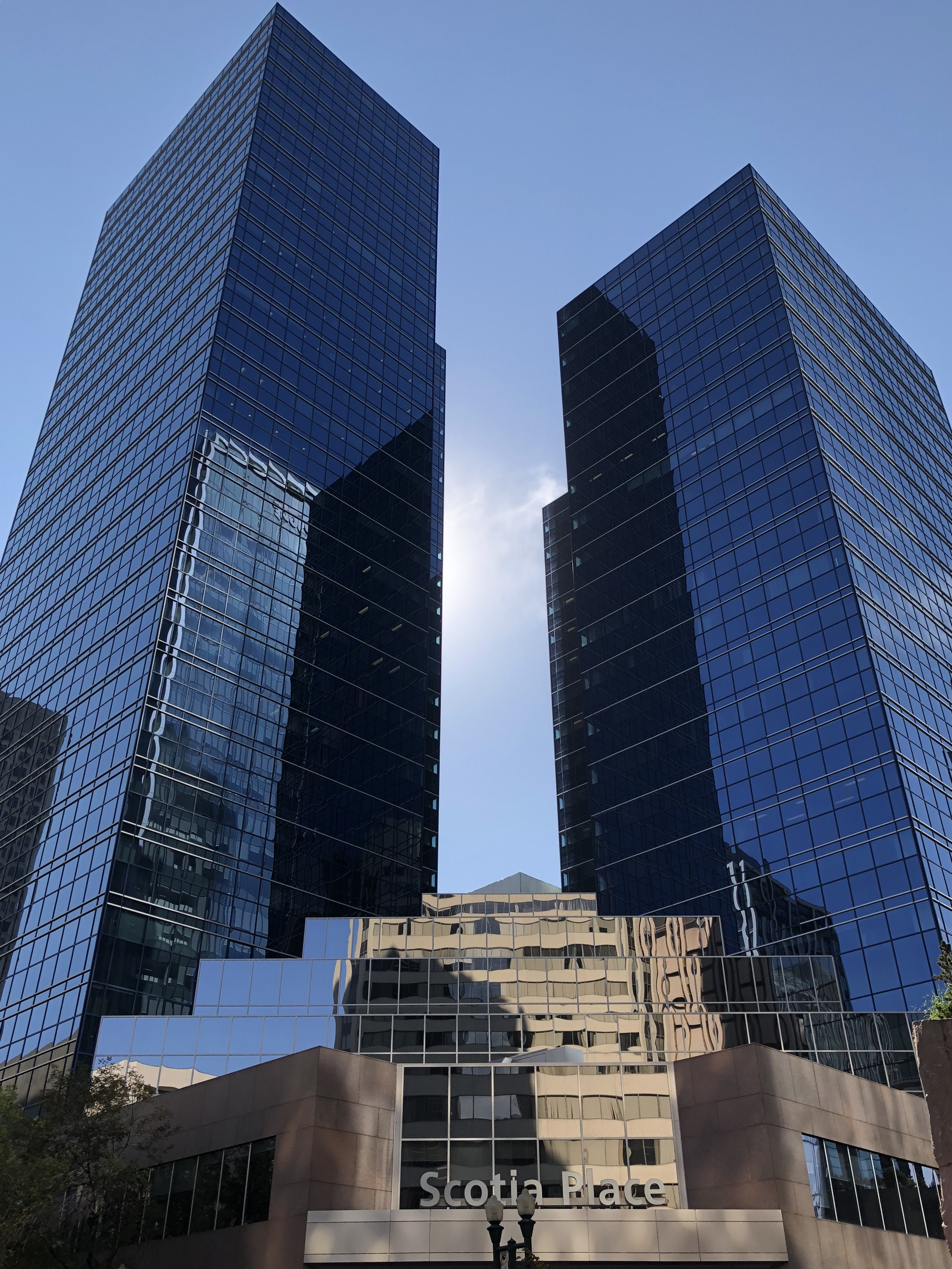
Rice Howard Place when it was still "Scotia Place"

The tallest tower in the complex is Tower 1, with 28 floors reaching 113 m (371 ft). Followed by Tower 2, with 21 floors reaching 88 m (289 ft).

== Pedway ==
Edmonton's extensive Pedway system allows downtown visitors to travel indoors to avoid the extreme weather. Rice Howard Place is part of that pedway which is linked directly to both the Edmonton LRT system, Commerce Place, and Enbridge Centre.

== See also ==
- List of tallest buildings in Edmonton
