= McLeod Building =

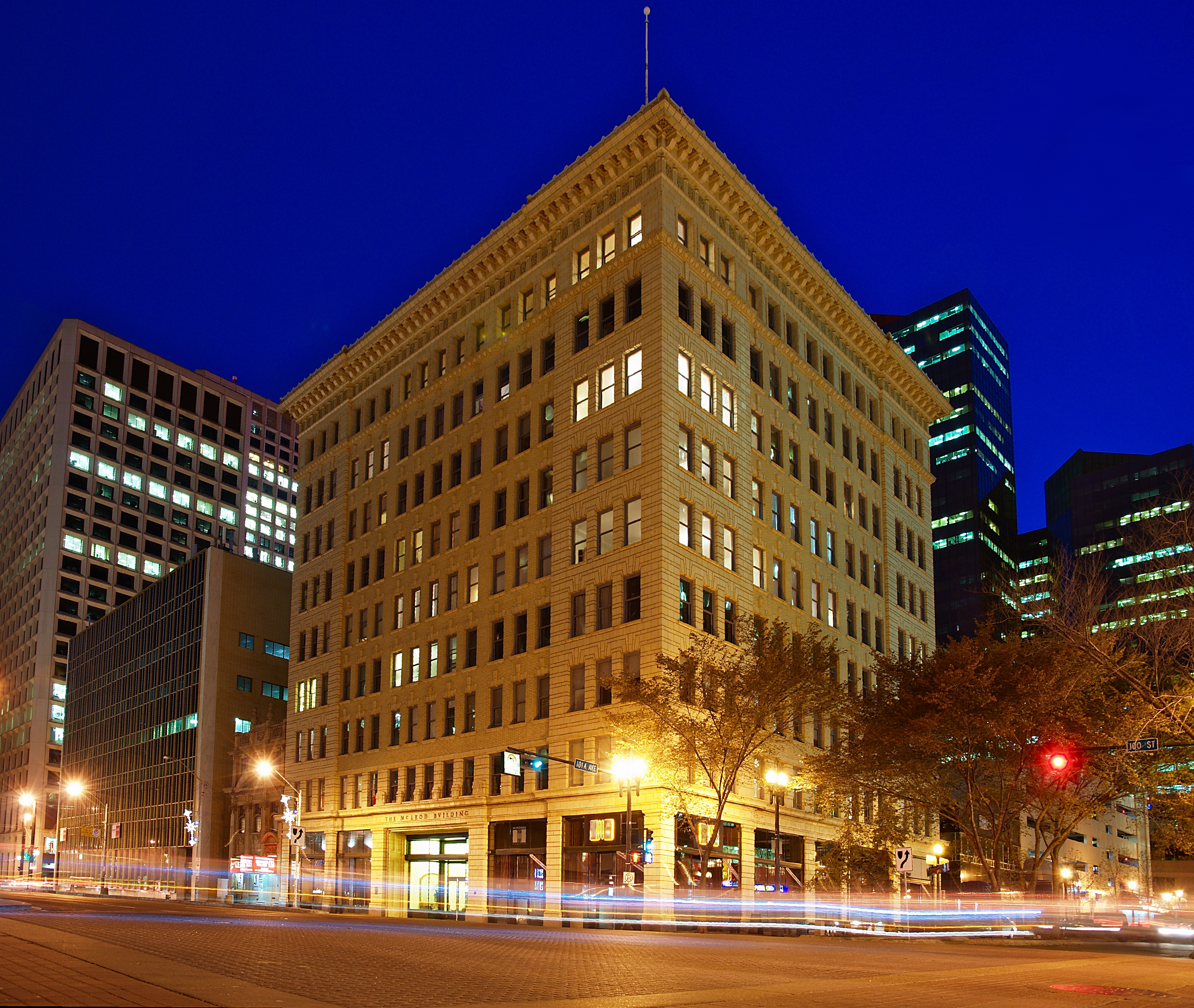

- Location within Edmonton

General information
- Status: Completed
- Type: Residential, Commercial
- Location: 10134-100th Street; Edmonton, Alberta, Canada
- Coordinates: 53°32′33″N 113°29′27″W
- Completed: 1915
- Cost: C$600,000

Height
- Roof: 35 m (115 ft)

Technical details
- Floor count: 9

Design and construction
- Architect: John K. Dow
- Main contractor: Olsen, Johnson, McPhee, Nicodemus

The McLeod Building is a historic office building located in Downtown Edmonton. It was designated a Provincial Historic Resource on January 3, 1995 and a Municipal Historic Resource on May 22, 2001.

== History ==
The McLeod Building during construction

Kenneth McLeod was a former Edmonton alderman, contractor and real estate speculator, who in 1912 announced the construction of the McLeod Building, which he claimed would be the tallest in the city, 25 ft (7.6 m) taller than the Tegler Building. Architect John K. Dow was instructed to copy the Paulsen Building in Spokane, Washington, which he had also built. The construction began in 1913 and was completed in 1915. Despite McLeod's claim about the building projected to be the tallest in Edmonton, the Alberta Legislature Building in the same city had already surpassed the height claimed by McLeod in 1913. The McLeod Building is considered Alberta’s best remaining example of an architectural style for commercial buildings known as the Chicago School.

Preceded by Alberta Legislature Building	Tallest building in Edmonton; 1915–1953; 35 m (115 ft)	Succeeded by Hotel Macdonald Annex
