= Alldritt Tower =

2017 skyscraper proposal for Edmonton, Canada

Coordinates: 53.542105°N 113.484545°W

Alldritt Tower, also known as Quarters Hotel and Residences, is an announced 80 storey mixed use skyscraper in Edmonton, Alberta. Intended to be built in The Quarters – an area of Edmonton's downtown slated for ongoing redevelopment – it was presented for a hearing at Edmonton City Hall in April 2017, receiving zoning approval from Edmonton City Council in May. At the time of the zoning approval, with a planned height of 280 metres (920 ft), Alldritt Tower would be the tallest building outside of Toronto (a mark held by Edmonton's Stantec Tower since topping out in 2018) and the second tallest building in Canada. As of April 2025, there has been no progress beyond the zoning approval granted in 2017, though Alldritt Group, a residential home and apartment developer based in Edmonton, continues to maintain a page for the project on its website.

== See also ==
- List of tallest buildings in Edmonton
