= Icon Towers =

Pair of skyscrapers in Alberta, Canada

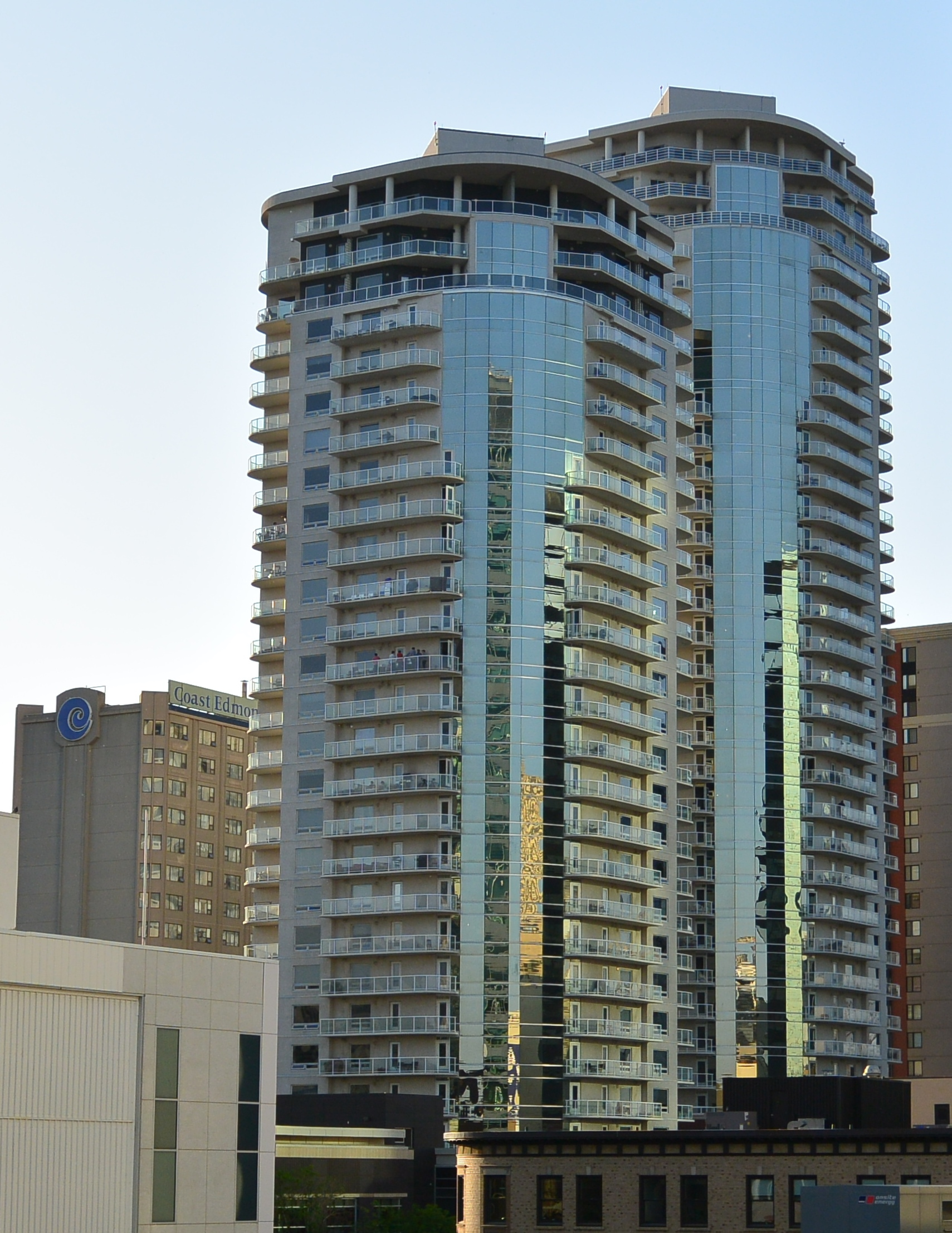
- Icon Towers

- Location within Edmonton

General information
- Status: Completed
- Type: Residential
- Location: Edmonton, Alberta, Canada
- Coordinates: 53°32′31″N 113°29′58″W
- Construction started: 2006
- Opening: Tower II: 2010; Tower I: 2009
- Cost: Tower II: C$85 million ($120 million in 2025 dollars) Tower I: C$85 million ($122 million in 2025 dollars) Total: $208 million in 2021 dollars

Height
- Roof: Tower II: 112.32 m (368.5 ft); Tower I: 92.36 m (303.0 ft)

Technical details
- Floor count: Tower II: 35; Tower I: 30

Design and construction
- Architect: Brinsmead Ziola Kennedy Architecture
- Developer: Langham Properties
- Main contractor: Graham Construction

The Icon Towers are a complex of two residential towers in downtown Edmonton, Alberta, Canada. The north tower, with 35 floors, has a height of 112 metres (367 ft) and the south tower, with 30 floors, has a height of 92 metres (302 ft). Tower I was completed in 2009, and II was completed in 2010. In the podium, there is street front retail, along with offices in the other floors between the retail and condos.

The buildings are on the emerging trendy 104 Street "Fourth Street Promenade" north of Jasper Avenue.

== Gallery ==
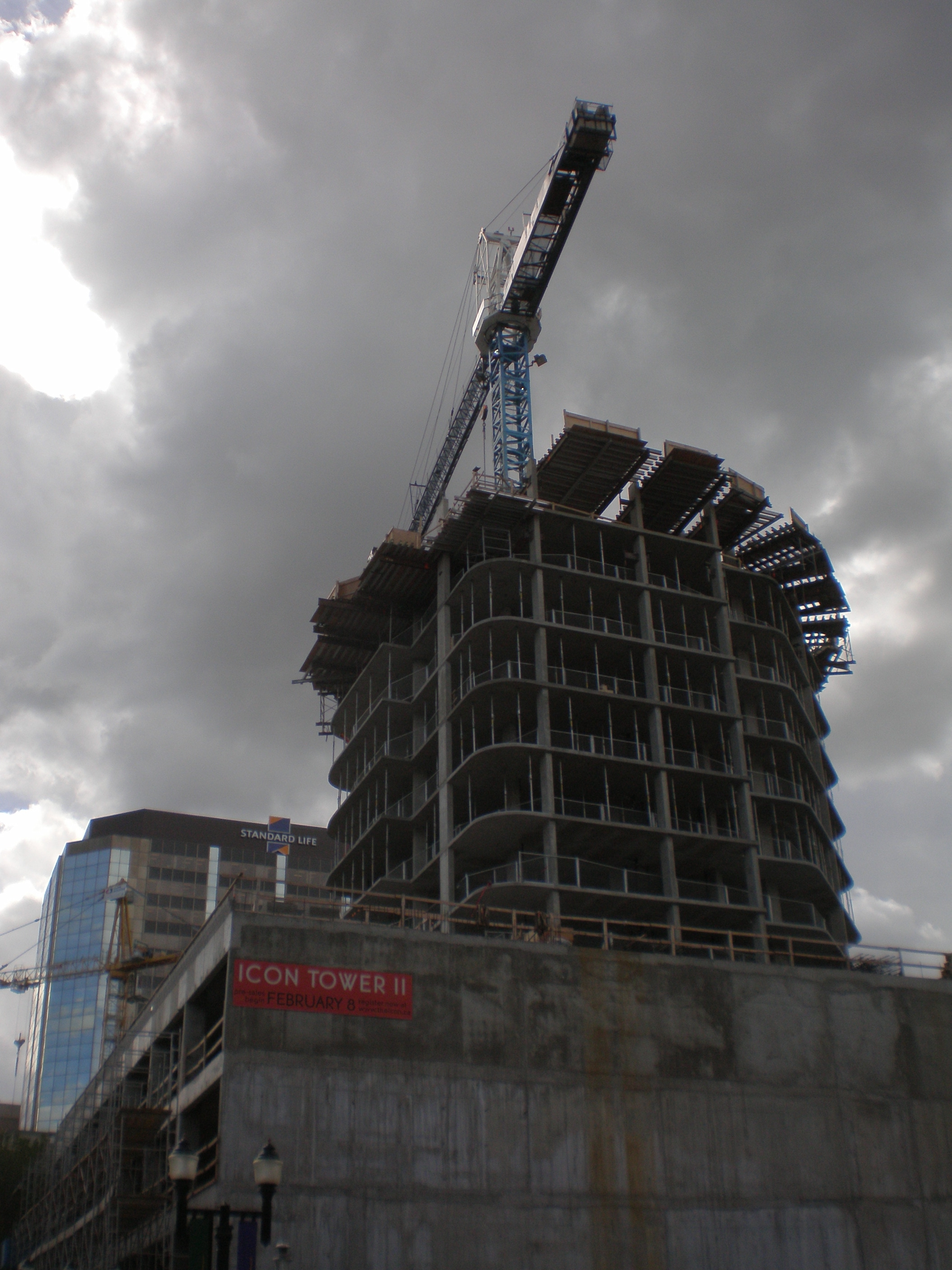
Icon Tower II under construction in April 2008

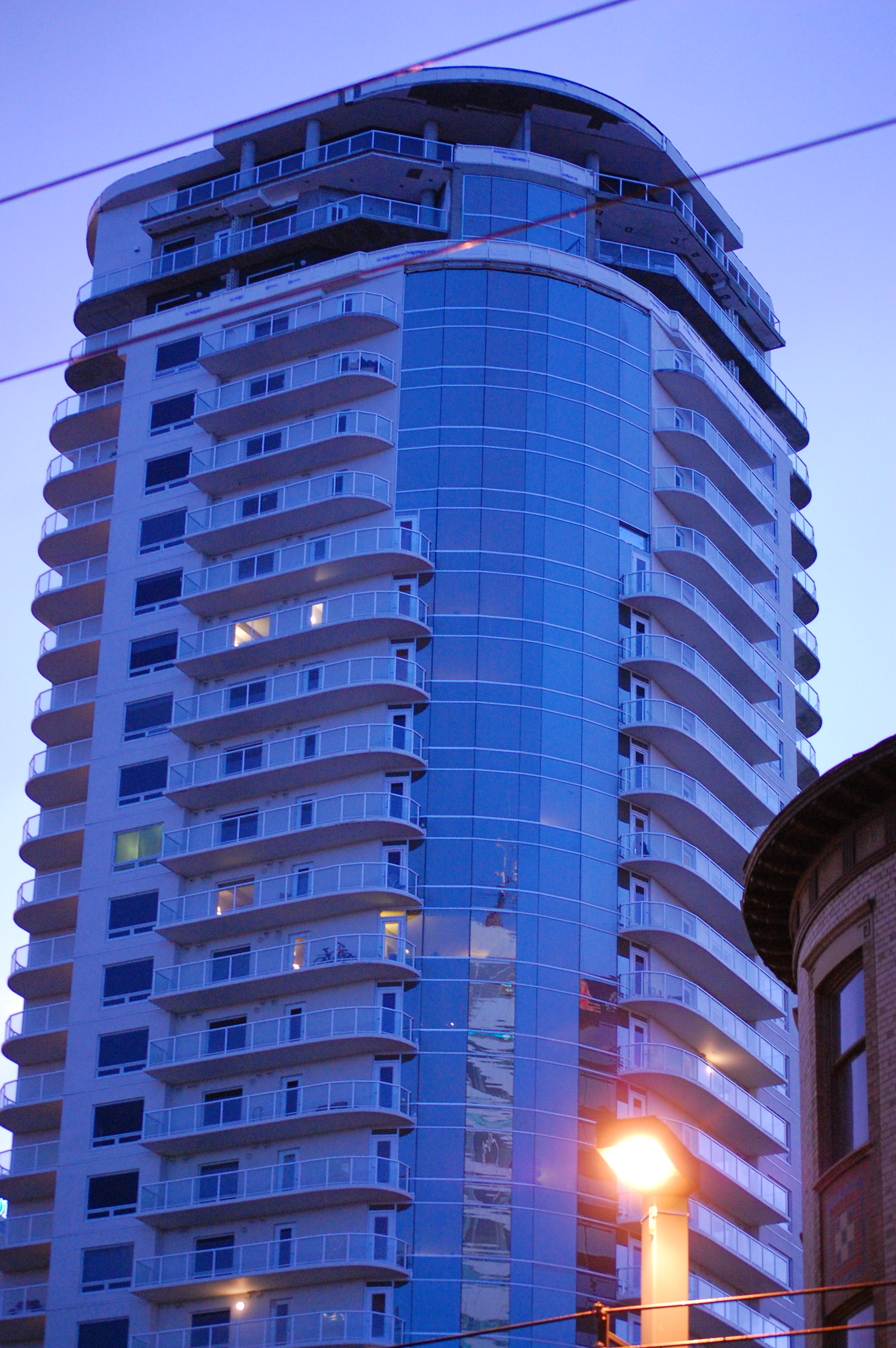
Completed Icon Tower I in April 2009

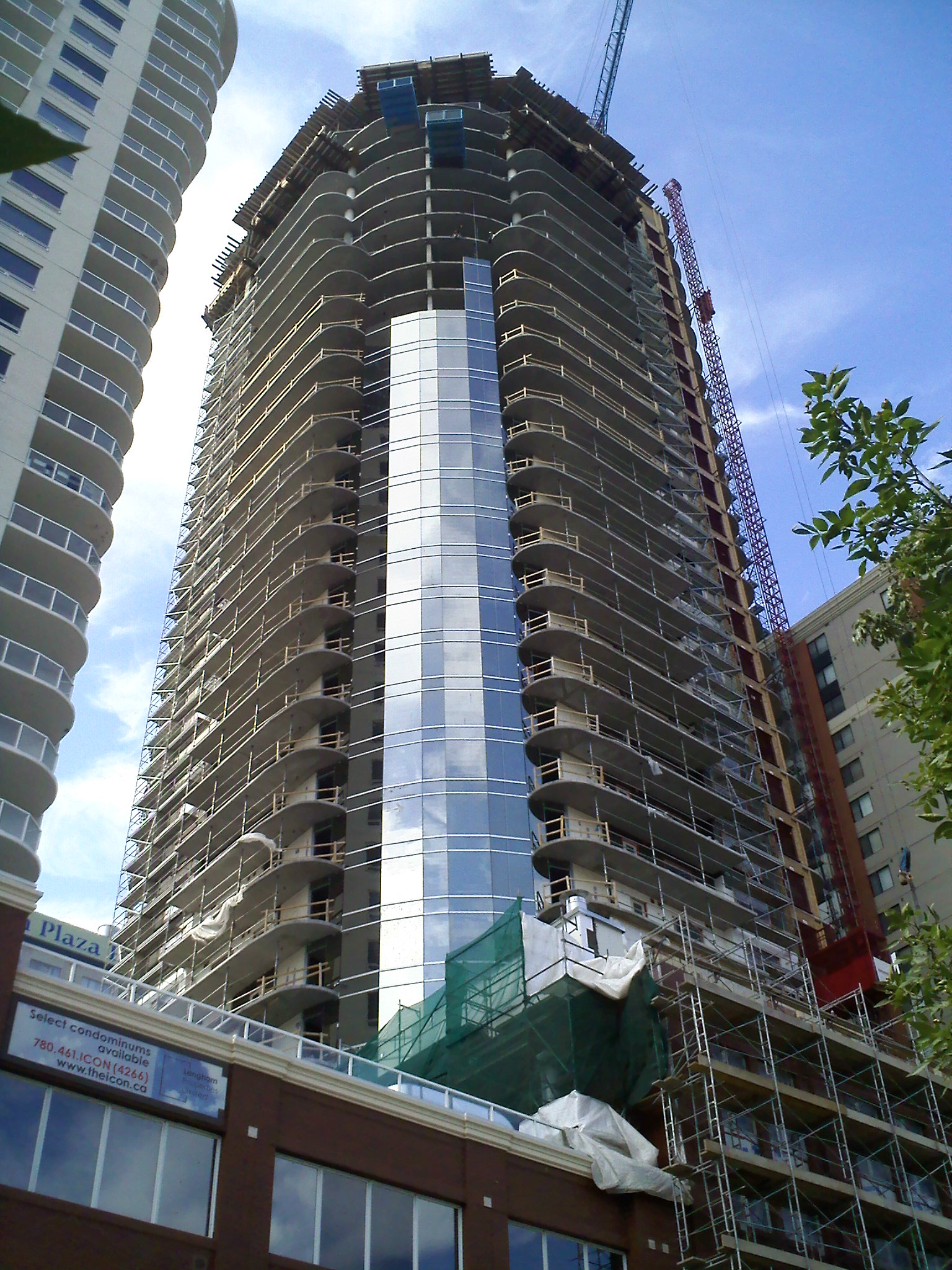
Icon Tower II under construction in September 2009

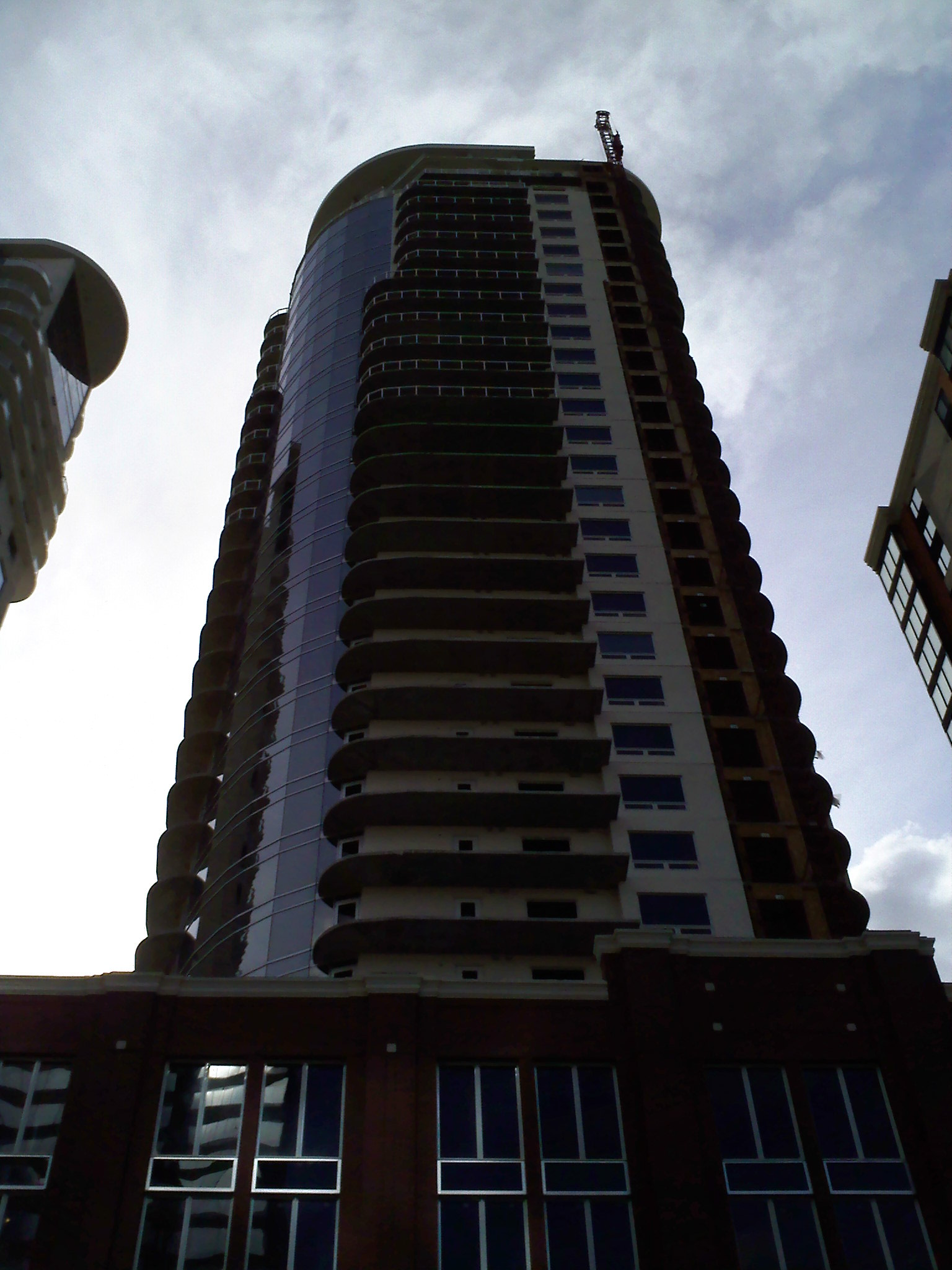
Icon Tower II under construction in June 2010

== See also ==
- List of tallest buildings in Edmonton
