= Edmonton House (building) =

Hotel and apartment building in Edmonton, Canada

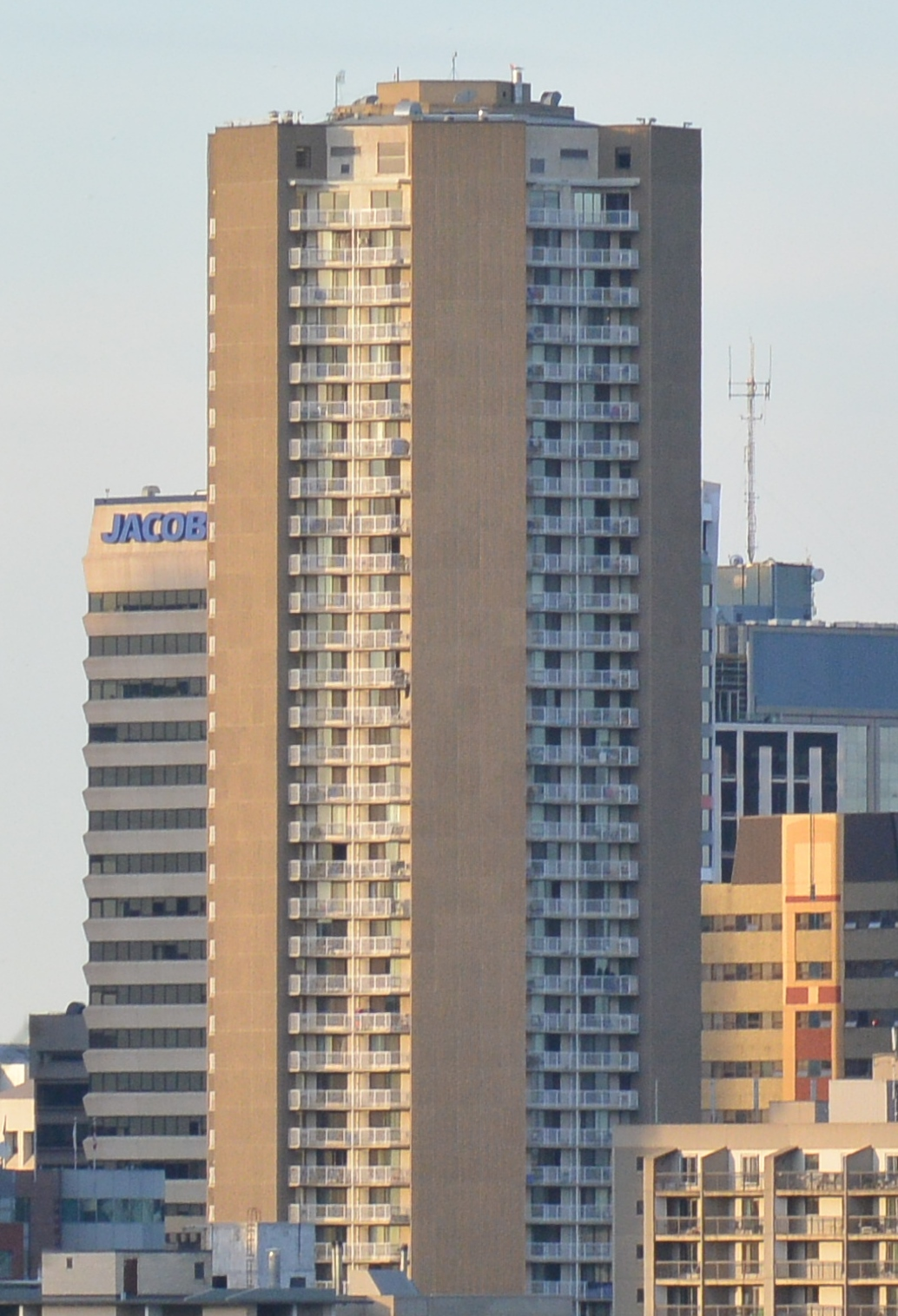

- Location within Edmonton
- Former names: Coast Edmonton House (2006-2013)

General information
- Type: Residential Apartments
- Location: 10205 100 Avenue NW; Edmonton, Alberta, Canada
- Coordinates: 53°32′18″N 113°29′42″W
- Completed: 1971
- Cost: C$7 million ($55 million in 2025 dollars)
- Owner: Leston James Financial Inc.
- Operator: Leston James Financial Inc.

Height
- Roof: 121.06 m (397.2 ft)

Technical details
- Floor count: 45

Design and construction
- Architects: CBK Van Norman & Associates

Edmonton House is a 45-storey building located in downtown Edmonton, Alberta. Opened as an apartment hotel, the building was re-branded into a hotel in 2006 before converting back in 2013. It stands at 121 metres (397 ft). When it was completed in 1971 it was the second tallest building in Edmonton, 13.3 metres (44 ft) shorter than AGT Tower which topped out just months before.

== See also ==
- List of tallest buildings in Edmonton
