= Epcor Tower =

Building in Alberta, Canada

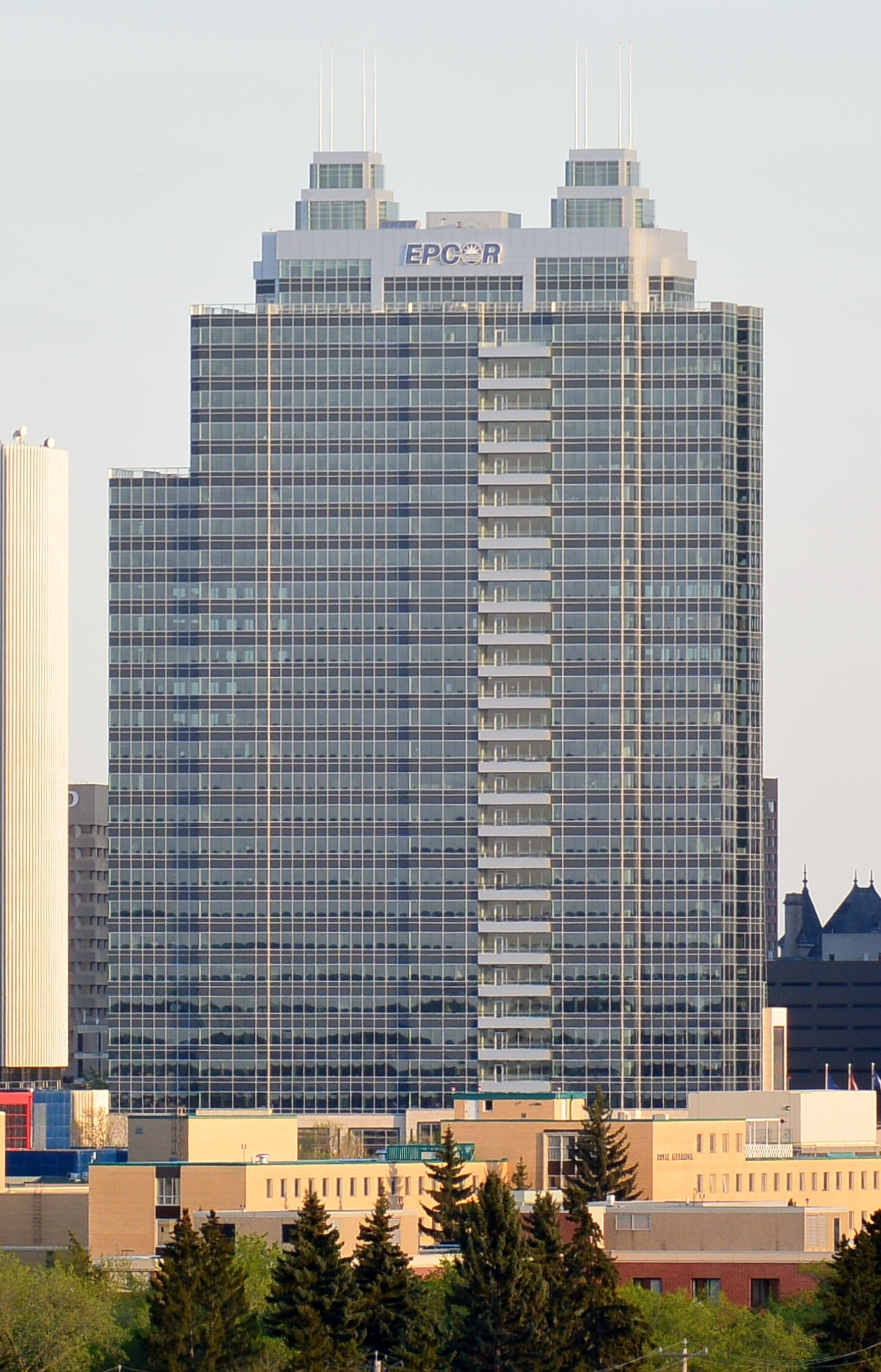
- Epcor Tower in May 2016

- Location within Edmonton

General information
- Status: Completed
- Type: Office, retail
- Location: 10423 101 St NW Edmonton, Alberta, Canada
- Coordinates: 53°32′51″N 113°29′34″W
- Construction started: 2008
- Completed: 2011
- Cost: C$250 million ($343 million in 2025 dollars)

Height
- Antenna spire: 149.345 m (489.98 ft)
- Roof: 137.30 m (450.5 ft)

Technical details
- Floor count: 28
- Floor area: 625,000 sq ft (58,100 m^{2}).
- Lifts/elevators: 6 high speed, mid-rise & 6 high speed, high-rise elevators, Oversize dedicated freight elevator serving all floors and loading dock, 3 parkade elevators

Design and construction
- Architects: Kasian Architecture Interior Design and Planning Ltd
- Developer: Qualico Group
- Main contractor: Ledcor

Website
- epcortower.ca

Epcor Tower is an office tower in downtown Edmonton, Alberta, Canada. The tower is capped by two spires that are capped with four flagpoles each. When the spires were taken into account, it was the tallest building in Edmonton from 2011 to 2017. Epcor Tower is the first building in the Station Lands project. Tenants includes EPCOR Utilities, Capital Power, Ernst & Young, Intuit, and BioWare.

== History ==
Development of the tower started in May 2007 when EPCOR Utilities began seeking proposals from developers to lease 260,000 square feet (24,000 m^{2}) of office space for their 1,100 employees in downtown Edmonton.

It was announced on December 7, 2007, that the company had chosen Qualico to provide the space with the construction of new office tower on the Station Lands site by the CN Tower. Epcor entered into a 20-year lease to become the anchor tenant of the tower with an option for a 15-year renewal. The structure was certified to a silver standard or higher under the Leadership in Energy and Environmental Design (LEED) program. LEED certification is a widely used standard for reducing energy, water and other resources in buildings. With the completion of the building, Edmonton saw its first new office tower in 17 years. Due to the nature of the anchor tenant, the building has been nicknamed the "Power Tower".

Construction of the tower began in spring 2008 and was completed in 2011.

In April 2008, Edmonton City Council approved $45 million in funding to immediately build a 180-metre underground portion of the future Metro LRT line beneath the tower's underground parkade, at the same time as the building's construction. The coordinated construction effort saved the City of Edmonton approximately $140 million. The remaining construction of the Metro Line resumed in 2012, with the line opening in September 2015.

Also in April 2008, Qualico announced plans to bid on the right to host a new Canadian national portrait gallery in the new building. However, the federal government scrapped the plan later in the year.

== Gallery ==
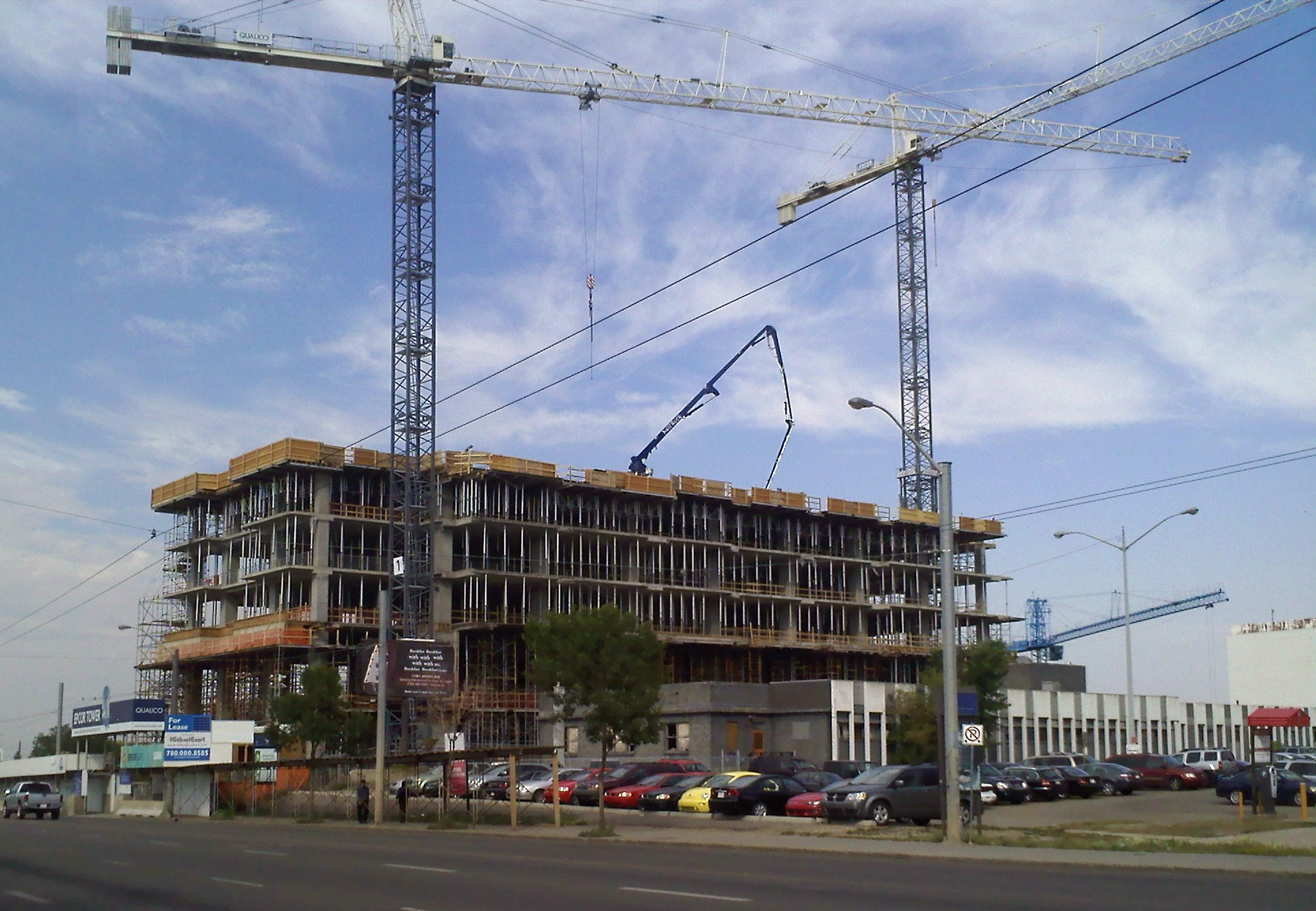
Construction of EPCOR Tower in September 2009

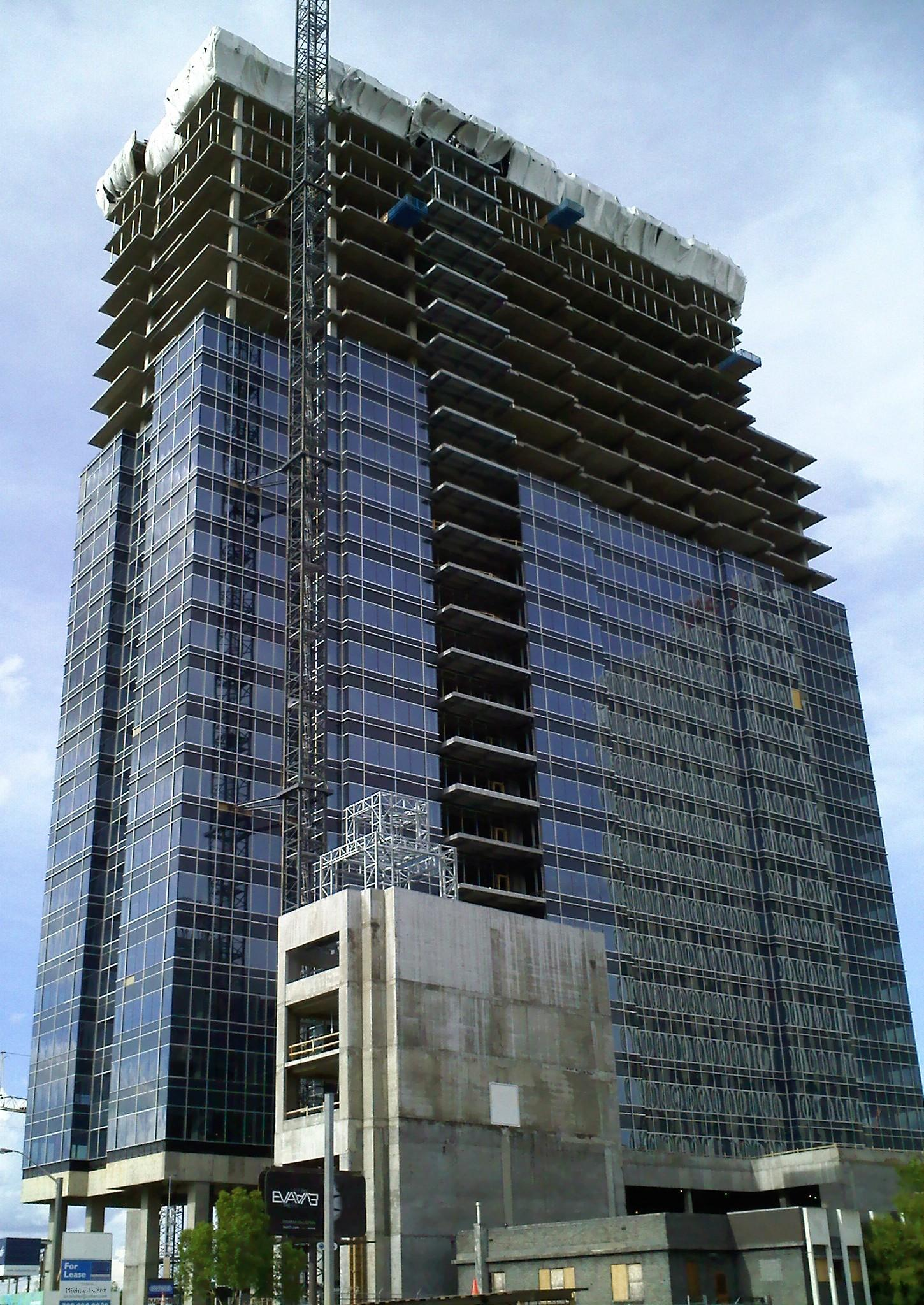
Construction of EPCOR Tower in June 2010

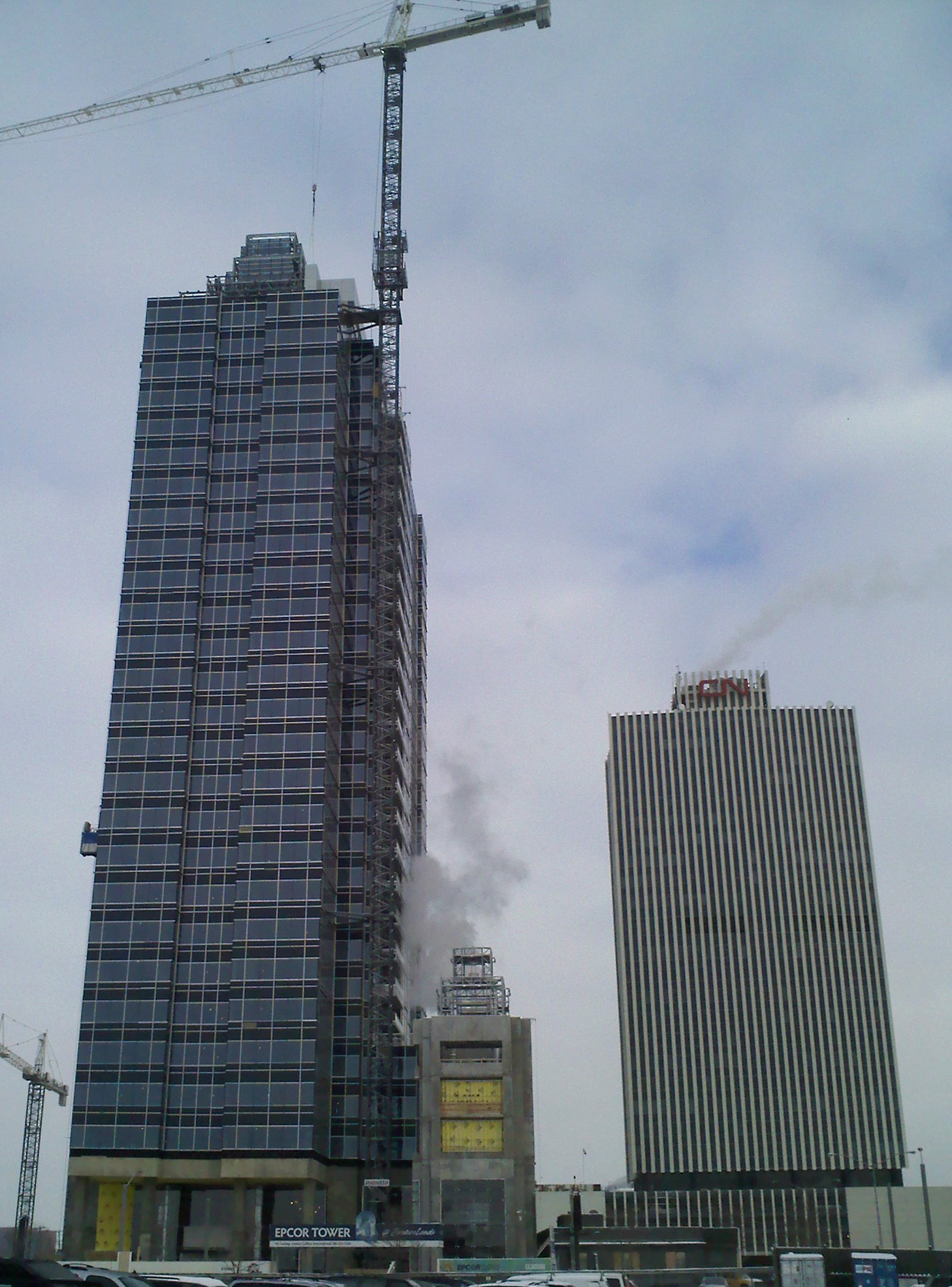
EPCOR Tower and CN Tower in December 2010

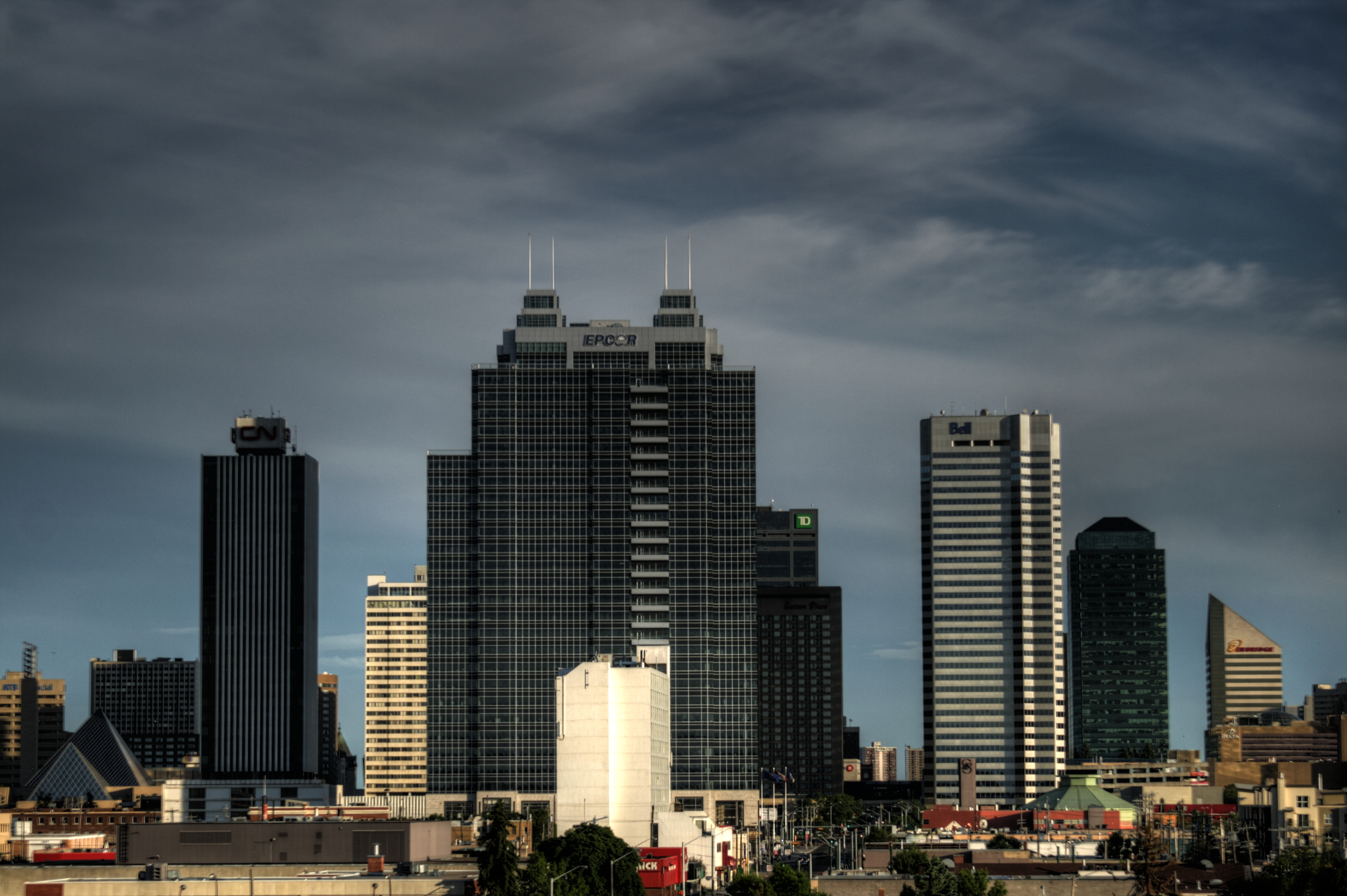
South view of Epcor Tower, summer 2012

== See also ==
- List of tallest buildings in Edmonton

Preceded by Manulife Place	Tallest building in Edmonton; 2011–2017; 149 m (489 ft)	Succeeded by JW Marriott Edmonton
