= 10104 103 Ave (Edmonton) =

Coordinates: 53.5450°N 113.4943°W

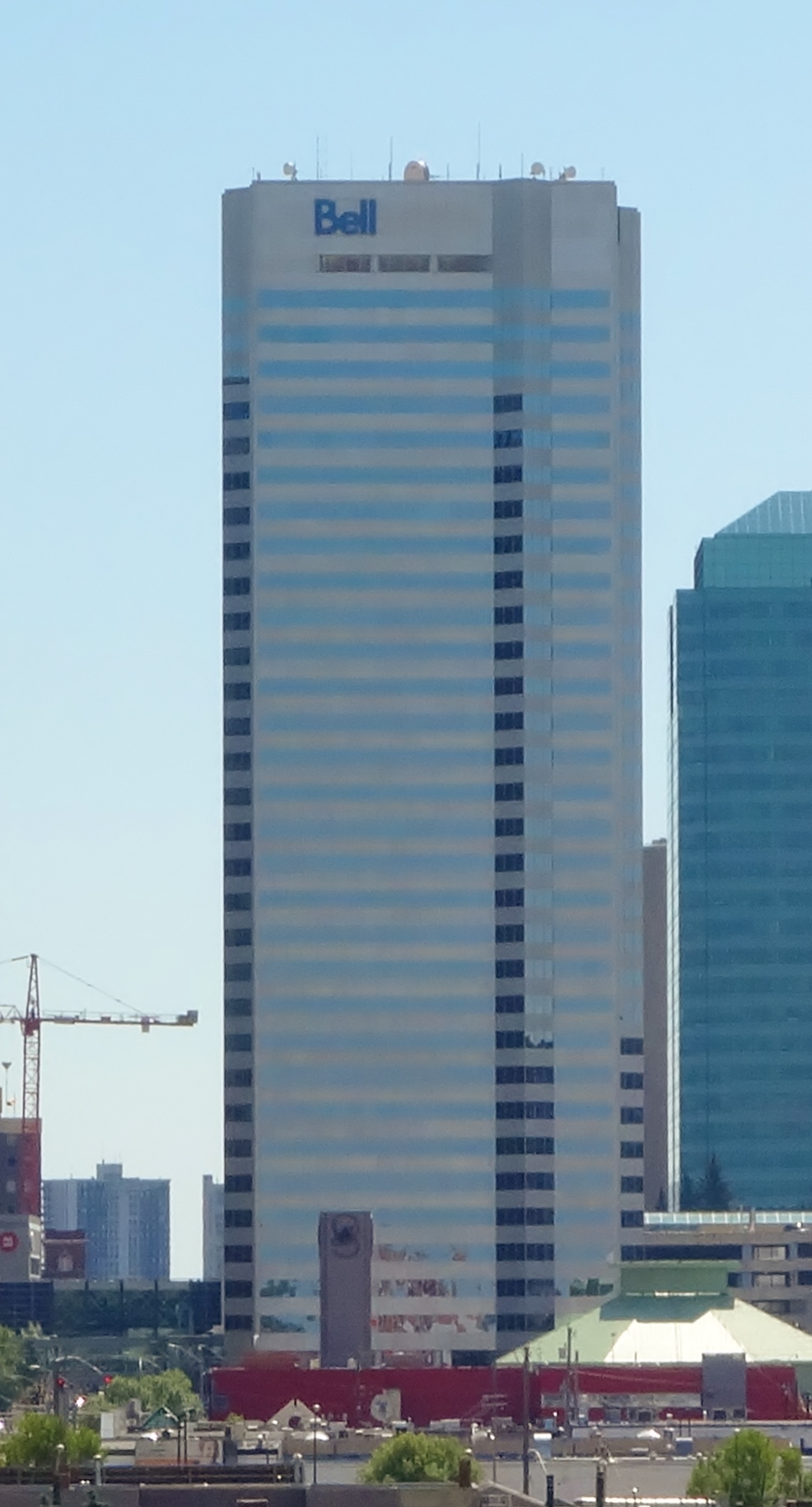
- The building in 2014.
- Former names: Bell Tower, Canada Trust Tower, Canadian Commercial Bank Tower
- Alternative names: 10104 103rd Avenue NW

General information
- Type: Commercial office
- Location: Edmonton, Alberta, Canada, 10104 103rd Avenue NW; Edmonton, AB T5J 0H8
- Opening: March 23, 1982
- Cost: $75 million
- Owner: Aspen Properties, Rohit Group

Technical details
- Floor count: 32 (Note: Building owner Aspen Properties lists 32 storeys in total, whereas database sources such as CTBUH list 31, counting strictly occupiable office floors.)

Design and construction
- Architects: Skidmore, Owings & Merrill, B. James Wensley Architect
- Developer: Oxford Development Group

Website
- www.aspenproperties.ca/10104-103-avenue

10104 103 Ave (formerly known as the Bell Tower, Canada Trust Tower, and Canadian Commercial Bank Tower) is a 32-storey commercial skyscraper in downtown Edmonton, Alberta, Canada. Located near the Ice District, the AA-class office tower is pedway-connected to neighboring amenities, including the MNP Tower, Sandman Signature Hotel, and Edmonton City Centre shopping mall.

== History ==
The building officially opened on March 23, 1982, as the Canadian Commercial Bank Tower (also referred to as the CCB Tower). Developed by Oxford Development Group as part of Phase 1 of its Edmonton Centre West project at a cost of $75 million, the glass-and-aluminum tower served as the headquarters for the Canadian Commercial Bank - which occupied six floors - until the institution's failure in 1985. A 60-foot granite wall sculpture by artist John Weaver was unveiled at the building's official opening.

In May 1986, following Canada Trust's acquisition of a co-ownership stake in the property through its subsidiary Truscan Realty Ltd., the building was renamed the Canada Trust Tower.

In May 2000, owner Oxford Properties Group announced that the building would be renamed the Bell Tower after Bell Canada signed a lease for space in the building. Following the expiration of the naming rights agreement, current owner Aspen Properties rebranded the building to its street address, 10104 103 Ave.

== See also ==
- List of tallest buildings in Edmonton
