= The Pearl (Edmonton) =

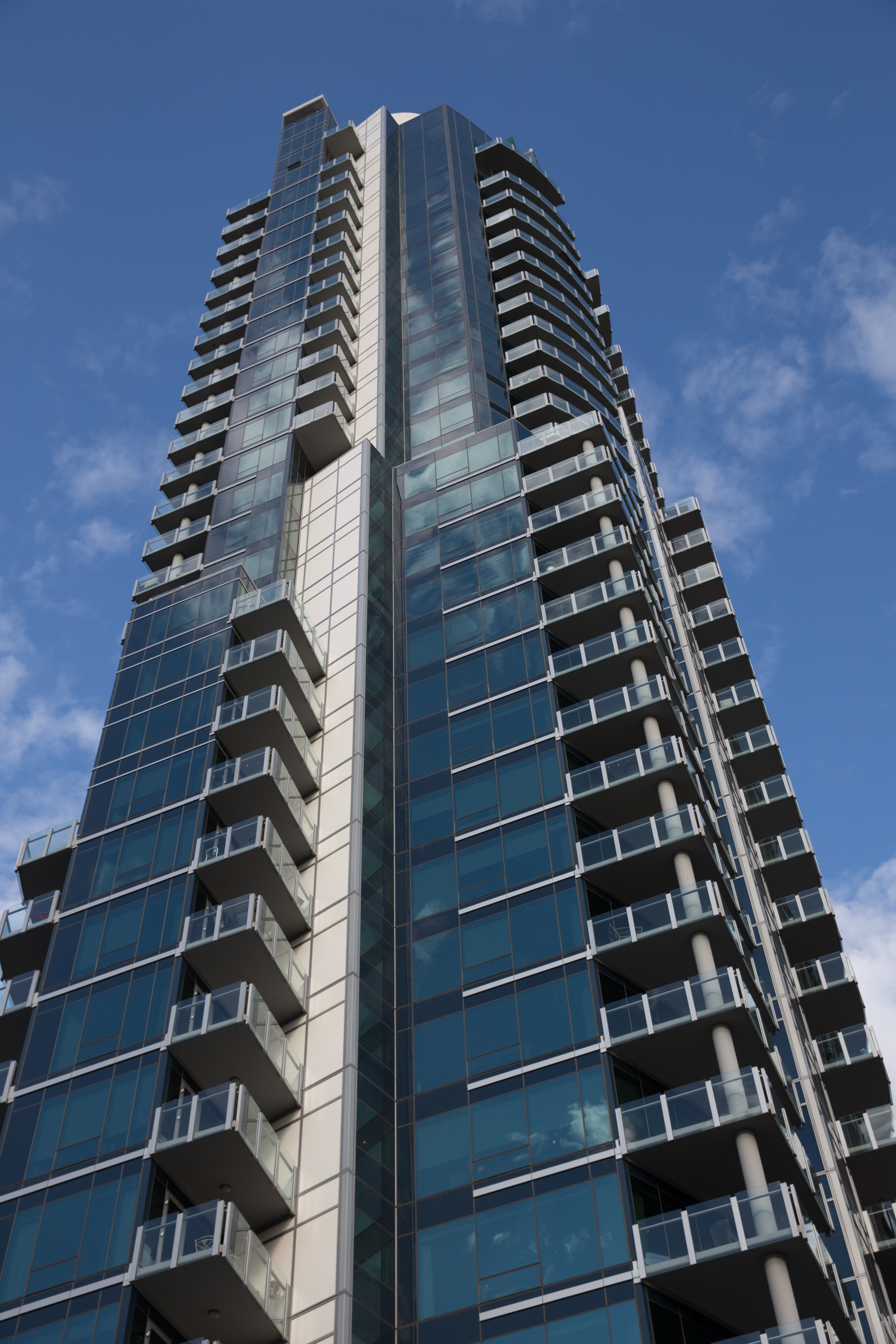
- The Pearl in September 2014.
- Interactive map of the The Pearl area

General information
- Status: Completed
- Type: Residential
- Location: 11949 Jasper Avenue; Edmonton, Alberta, Canada
- Coordinates: 53°32′26″N 113°31′43″W
- Construction started: 2010
- Completed: May 2015
- Cost: $38.5 million CAD ($49.9 million in 2025 dollars)

Height
- Tip: 121 m (397 ft)
- Roof: 112.8 m (370 ft)

Technical details
- Floor count: 36

Design and construction
- Architect: Brinsmead Ziola Kennedy Architecture
- Developer: Regency Developments

The Pearl is a condominium tower in the Wîhkwêntôwin neighbourhood of Edmonton, Alberta, Canada. It is the city's 5th tallest residential building.

== See also ==
- List of tallest buildings in Edmonton
