= JW Marriott Edmonton =

Skyscraper in Alberta, Canada

JW Marriott Edmonton ICE District & Legends Residences
- JW Marriott Edmonton Skyline from Blatchford

- Location within Edmonton
- Alternative names: EAD Hotel and Residences, Edmonton Arena District Hotel
- Hotel chain: JW Marriott Hotels

General information
- Status: Completed
- Type: Luxury Hotel, Residential
- Location: 104 Avenue NW and 102 Street NW, Edmonton, Alberta, Canada
- Coordinates: 53°32′45″N 113°29′46″W
- Elevation: 192 metres (630 ft)
- Construction started: November 2014
- Completed: June 2019
- Opening: August 1, 2019
- Cost: $500 Million ($604 million in 2025 dollars)
- Owner: Marriott International, Legends Private Residences
- Operator: Hariri Pontarini Architects
- Affiliation: Marriott International

Height
- Tip: 192.15 m (630.4 ft)
- Roof: 190.95 m (626.5 ft)

Technical details
- Material: Reinforced Concrete, Steel, Glass curtain wall
- Floor count: 55
- Floor area: 71,535 m^{2} (770,000 sq ft)

Design and construction
- Architects: Hariri Pontarini Architects, DIALOG, Shugarman Architecture + Design
- Developer: ICE District Properties, Katz Group Properties, ONE Development Group, Marriott International

Other information
- Number of rooms: 346
- Facilities: Conference centre, Hotel services, Exercise facility, Swimming pool, Edmonton Pedway, direct assess to Rogers Place

The JW Marriott Edmonton Ice District & Residences is a mixed-use skyscraper in Edmonton, Alberta as part of the downtown Ice District. It is a combination of a JW Marriott hotel in the lower section, with residential condos named Legends Private Residences in the upper section. Construction began in November 2014 and the hotel opened on August 1, 2019. The tower became the tallest building in Edmonton on November 3, 2017 and held that status until it was surpassed by the Stantec Tower in May 2018, en route to topping out its 56th floor at its final height of 192 metres (630 ft) on March 20, 2018.

The hotel is located on the 1st through 22nd floors, and has 346 rooms, 2,300 square metres (25,000 sq ft) of conference hall space and a 930 square metres (10,000 sq ft) ballroom. Located from the 23rd through 54th floors is the Legends Private Residences, with high-end condominiums to buy or rent. The building has a total of 55 floors, at a height of 192.95 m (633.0 ft). The tower topped out in March 2018 and reached its final design height on May 8, 2018. Originally the hotel was going to be a Delta hotel, but Marriott closed the purchase deadline first. It is the third JW Marriott hotel in Canada, after the JW Marriott The Rosseau Muskoka Resort & Spa in the District Municipality of Muskoka in Ontario, and the JW Marriott Parq Vancouver in Vancouver, British Columbia.

== See also ==
- List of tallest buildings in Edmonton

Preceded by Epcor Tower	Tallest building in Edmonton; 2017–2018; 192 m (630 ft)	Succeeded by Stantec Tower
