= ATB Place =

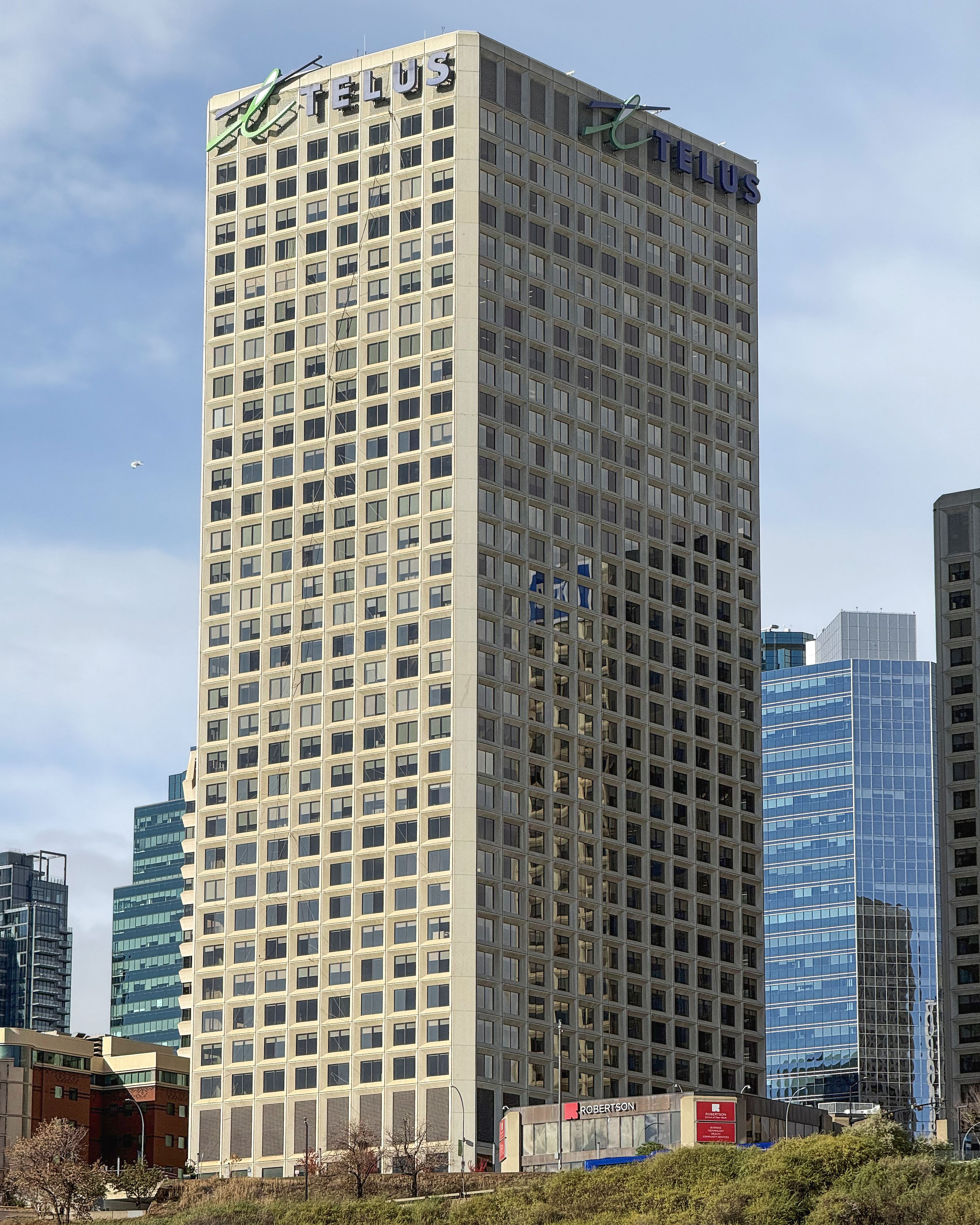
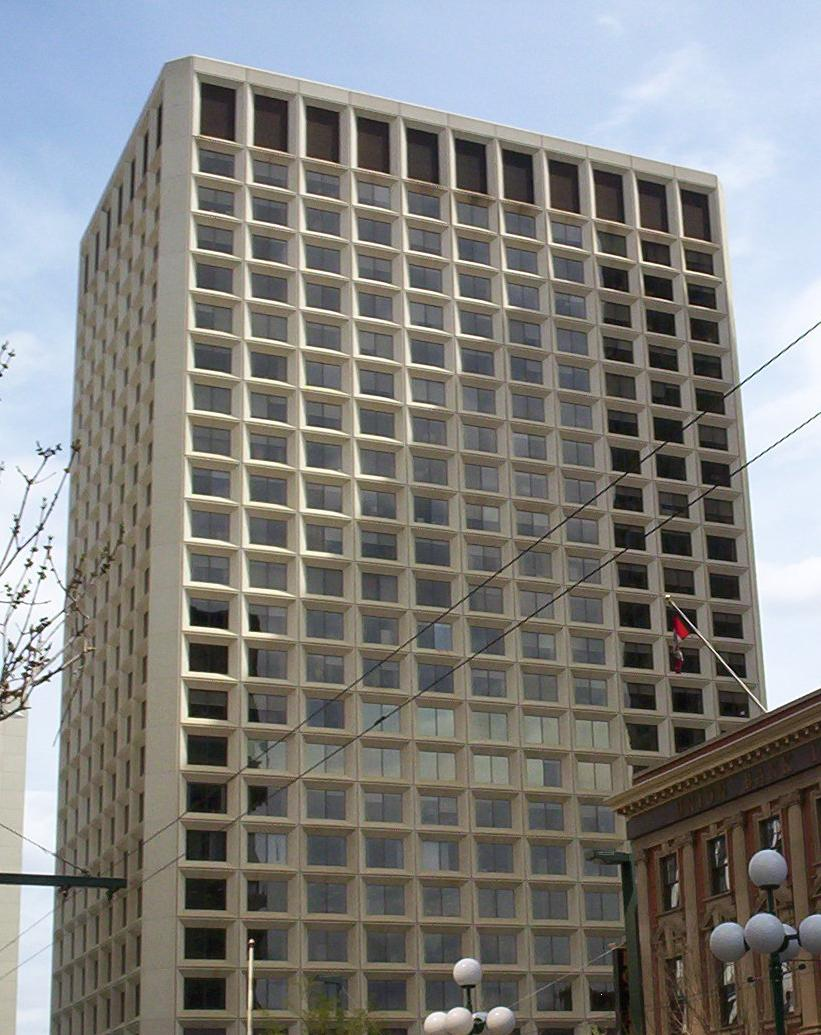
- Top: TELUS House Edmonton; Bottom: ATB Place Tower

- Location within Edmonton
- Former names: Telus Plaza; McCauley Plaza

General information
- Status: Completed
- Type: Office
- Location: 10020 100 Street NW; Edmonton, Alberta, Canada
- Coordinates: 53°32′25″N 113°29′27″W
- Completed: TELUS House: 1971; ATB Place: 1969
- Cost: TELUS House: Can$22 million ($173 million in 2025 dollars) ATB Place Tower: Can$10 million ($83.4 million in 2025 dollars) Total: $220.9 million in 2021 dollars

Height
- Roof: TELUS House Edmonton: 134.4 m (441 ft); ATB Place Tower: 90 m (300 ft)

Technical details
- Floor count: TELUS House: 33; ATB Place Tower: 24

Design and construction
- Developer: Rule Wynn and Rule
- Main contractor: PCL Constructors, Inc.

Other information
- Public transit: Central station

ATB Place, formerly Telus Plaza, is an office complex in Edmonton, Alberta, Canada. Originally built as the headquarters of Alberta Government Telephones (AGT), the two office towers in the complex–ATB Place Tower and Telus House Edmonton – serve as the headquarters of ATB Financial and the Alberta provincial headquarters for Telus, respectively.

The south tower, Telus House Edmonton (formerly TELUS Plaza South, and originally the AGT Tower (Alberta Government Telephones Tower)), was completed in 1971, at a cost of Can$22 million. It was Edmonton's tallest building until Manulife Place was completed in 1981. It is 134.4 metres (34 storeys) tall. For many years the 33rd floor was home to Vista 33, a telephone and telecommunications museum. There was also an observation deck which afforded panoramic views of Edmonton from what was then the city's tallest building. Vista 33 was closed in 1993.

ATB Tower is 90 metres tall (26 storeys, 296 feet) and was completed in 1969. It contains retail space at the ground level and via Edmonton Pedway system to the Edmonton LRT in the concourse of ATB Place. The concourse courtyard was added after TELUS moved in and renovated it. It opened as McCauley Plaza, named after the first mayor of Edmonton, in which a bronze bust was displayed. The location was later renamed TELUS Plaza. After the name change to ATB Place, the bust was removed from public viewing.

A third building, the two storey ATB Place annex, is located at the southeast corner of the complex. Originally the home of the (now defunct) Edmonton Club, later the main office of an engineering firm, it is currently occupied by a career college.

Prior to the construction of the AGT buildings, this site was the home of the main branch of the Edmonton Public Library, which stood there from 1923 to 1969.

== See also ==
- List of tallest buildings in Edmonton

Preceded by CN Tower	Tallest building in Edmonton; 1971–1983; 134.4 m (441 ft)	Succeeded by Manulife Place
