= National Bank Centre =

- National Bank Centre in October 2026

- Location within Edmonton
- Former names: Manulife Place (1981–2025)

General information
- Status: Completed
- Type: Office, retail
- Location: 10180 101 Street NW; Edmonton, Alberta; T5J 3S4
- Coordinates: 53°32′33″N 113°29′41″W
- Named for: National Bank of Canada (formerly Manulife Financial)
- Construction started: 1981
- Completed: 1983
- Opening: 12 October 1983
- Cost: CA$100 million ($283 million in 2025 dollars)
- Owner: Manulife Investment Management and AIMCo (National Bank is naming rights holder)

Height
- Roof: 146.36 m (480.2 ft)

Technical details
- Floor count: 36

Design and construction
- Architect: Clifford Lawrie Bolton Ritchie Architects
- Structural engineer: Read Jones Christoffersen Ltd.
- Main contractor: PCL Constructors, Inc.

Other information
- Public transit: 102 Street stop

Website
- https://nationalbankcentre.com/

National Bank Centre (formerly Manulife Place) is a high-rise office building and shopping mall in Edmonton, Alberta, Canada. Completed in 1983 and designed by Clifford Lawrie Bolton Ritchie Architects, it is located at the corner of 102 Avenue and 101 Street in downtown Edmonton. At 146 meters (479 ft) with 36 floors, it was the tallest building in Edmonton from 1983 until 2011, when it was overtaken by Epcor Tower.

Naming rights were held by insurer Manulife from the building's opening until 2025, when they were acquired by the National Bank of Canada as part of its expansion in Western Canada. Following the acquisition, the complex was officially rebranded as the National Bank Centre.

The building features a two-level shopping concourse and is connected by the Edmonton Pedway to Edmonton City Centre and Commerce Place.

== History ==
The location of Manulife Place was formerly the home of the King Edward Hotel which stood on the site from 1906 until it was destroyed by a fire in 1978. Demolition of the hotel began in September 1979 and was completed in early 1980.

In late 1978, land assembly for the building began at a cost of $20 million. In January 1979, it was revealed Manulife had purchased King Edward Hotel site at a reported price of $300 per square foot. In March 1980, Manulife announced plans to construct two skyscrapers at the hotel site. The complex would consist of a 27-storey office tower and a 20-storey tower (either an office tower or hotel) and would be built in phases. The towers would also be anchored by a ground level, two-storey shopping mall. In July 1980, Manulife abandoned their original two-stage plan and announced their revised plans would consist of a single 36-storey office tower with a retail complex. The revised project would feature a 460 feet (140 m) tower with 620,000 square feet of space, which would make it the tallest building in Edmonton. The tower would be connected to a three-storey podium, with office space occupying at the top level and the two lower levels dedicated to retail. Additionally, the complex would include a three-storey underground parking garage with space for 500 vehicles. Edmonton City Council approved the project in December 1980.

Construction on the building began in June 1981 with a scheduled completion of June 1983. In February 1983, luxury department chain Holt Renfrew reopened in Manulife Place after relocating from their Jasper Avenue location. The building officially opened on 12 October 1983 at a cost of $100 million. At the time of opening, 70 percent of the complex's retail space was leased but only 12 percent of the office space was leased due to the poor office leasing market. Manulife Place was constructed by the local general contractor PCL Construction, with another local contractor, C. W. Carry manufacturing and erecting the structural steel.

A pedway connecting Manulife Place with Eaton Centre over 102 Avenue opened in March 1984. A second shopping mall, Manulife Place Phase II, opened on April 20, 1988. The mall, located west of Manulife Place and north of the Hudson's Bay Company building (now known as Enterprise Square), is connected to the existing complex by a pedway over 102 Street and featured 75 stores and services across two-storeys. A pedway connecting to CityCentre opened in March 1993.

On May 15, 2019, Holt Renfrew announced that they would be closing their 47,000 square foot store at Manulife Place on January 11, 2020, as the Louis Vuitton concession inside the store had departed for West Edmonton Mall, and as the Holt Renfrew chain had decided to focus on larger stores with 130,000 square feet or more.

In January 2025, Epic Investment Services announced the building would undergo a $45 million redevelopment that would include a modernization of the podium and new amenities. On April 22, 2025, National Bank of Canada announced that Manulife Place would be renamed National Bank Centre. Exterior crown signage for National Bank was installed in December 2025, marking the completion of the building's physical rebranding.

== See also ==
- List of tallest buildings in Edmonton
- List of Edmonton malls

Preceded by AGT Tower	Tallest building in Edmonton; 1983–2011; 146 m (479 ft)	Succeeded by Epcor Tower
