= List of tallest buildings in Edmonton =

Skyline of Edmonton
- Downtown Edmonton and Walterdale Bridge in 2026
- Tallest building: Stantec Tower (2019)
- Tallest building height: 248.9 m (816 ft)
- First 150 m+ building: JW Marriott Edmonton (2018)

Number of tall buildings (2026)
- Taller than 100 m (328 ft): 25
- Taller than 150 m (492 ft): 2
- Taller than 200 m (656 ft): 1

Edmonton skyline from Saskatchewan Drive in 2026

Wîhkwêntôwin in 2026

Edmonton is the capital and second largest city of the Canadian province of Alberta. With a city population of 1,010,899 and a metropolitan area population of 1,418,118 as of 2021, it is the fifth-largest city and sixth-largest metropolitan area in Canada. As the northernmost city in North America with a population of over one million, Edmonton has the northernmost skyscapers and high-rises taller than 100 metres (328 feet), 150 m (492 ft) and 200 m (656 ft) on the continent. As of 2025, Edmonton has 25 buildings taller than 100 m (330 ft), two of which reach a height of 150 m (492 ft). The tallest building in Edmonton is the 249 m (816 ft) Stantec Tower, the tallest building in Canada outside of the Greater Toronto Area.

Edmonton's first true skyscraper, and the tallest building in Western Canada for five years, was the CN Tower, built in 1966. A building boom did not really begin until the oil shocks of 1973 and 1979, which prompted construction of many office towers. High-rise construction was virtually non-existent between the mid-1980s and the early 2000s due to low oil prices, upon which Edmonton's economy is largely dependent on. The rapid oil price increases of 2003-2008 had created a new boom in Alberta and prompted new construction again. By the late 2000s, the city was experiencing a building boom, with 780,000 square feet (72,000 m^{2}) of office space under construction in 2008 and vacancy rates then falling. Due to the time lag between the beginning of the boom and when buildings are completed, the next wave of new high-rise buildings really began construction in 2006 or 2007 and many were not completed until after the 2008 financial crisis had caused a drop in oil prices.

Until late 2013, the presence of aircraft taking off and landing at Edmonton City Centre Airport restricted any building from reaching an elevation higher than 815.34 metres (2,675.0 ft) above mean sea level, about 150 metres (490 ft) above downtown. The removal of this limit allowed for the construction of the city's current tallest and second tallest building in 2019: Stantec Tower, completed at 248.9 m (816 ft) tall and JW Marriott Edmonton Ice District & Residences, which was built to a height of 191 m (627 ft). It held the title of the tallest building in Edmonton for less than a year before it was overtaken by Stantec Tower.

Most of Edmonton's tallest buildings are located in or near Downtown Edmonton, forming a continuous core of high-rises that extends east along Jasper Avenue towards Boyle Street, and westwards towards Wîhkwêntôwin (formerly Oliver). The skyline is separated from the North Saskatchewan River to the south by Victoria Park and the riverfront neighbourhood of Rossdale. Additionally, several residential high-rises form a line of tall buildings on the northern edge of Strathcona, bordering the River Valley Walterdale area. There are also a few high-rises near the University of Alberta, in the neighbourhood of Garneau.

== History ==
Number of buildings by height in Edmonton by the end of each year. Click on the legend to toggle a specific height on or off. View chart definition.

=== 1910s–1950s ===
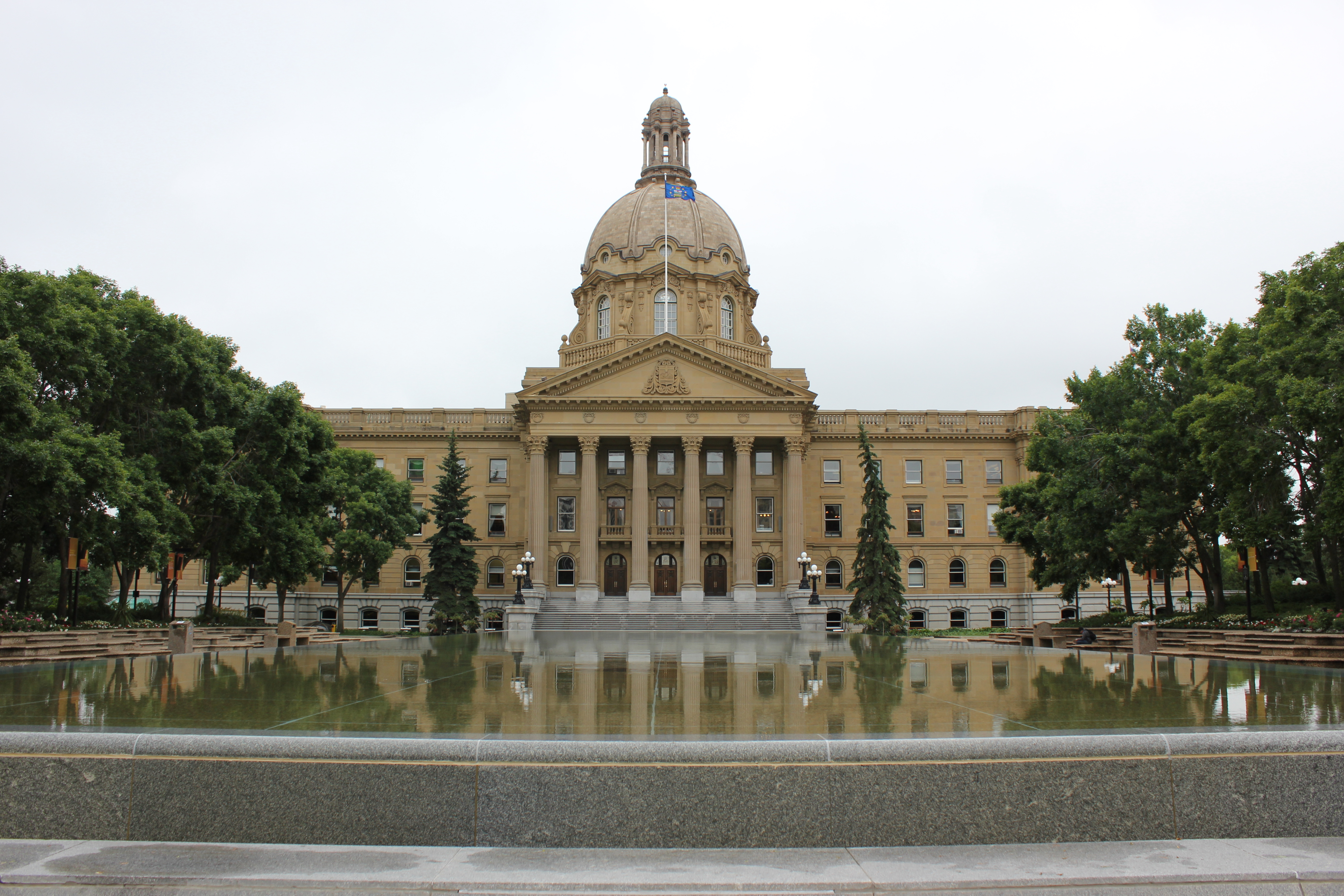
The Alberta Legislature Building

The history of high-rises in Edmonton begins with the Tegler Building, an eight-story office building. When it was built in 1912, it was the largest building in western Canada by floor area at 15,750 square meters. It would remain as Edmonton's tallest building for under two years, until the completion of the Alberta Legislature Building in 1913, to serve as the meeting place for Alberta's legislature. Edmonton was designated as Alberta's capital only eight years earlier, in 1905, when the province was formed. Prior to the completion of the current legislature building, the Legislative Assembly met in a hall annexed to the old Terrace Building. While Edmonton's population grew over tenfold from 24,900 to 281,027 between 1911 and 1961, it was still a relatively small city, and so very few high-rises were built in the city before the 1960s. The Alberta Legislature Building remained the tallest building in the city for over half a century.

=== 1960s–1970s ===
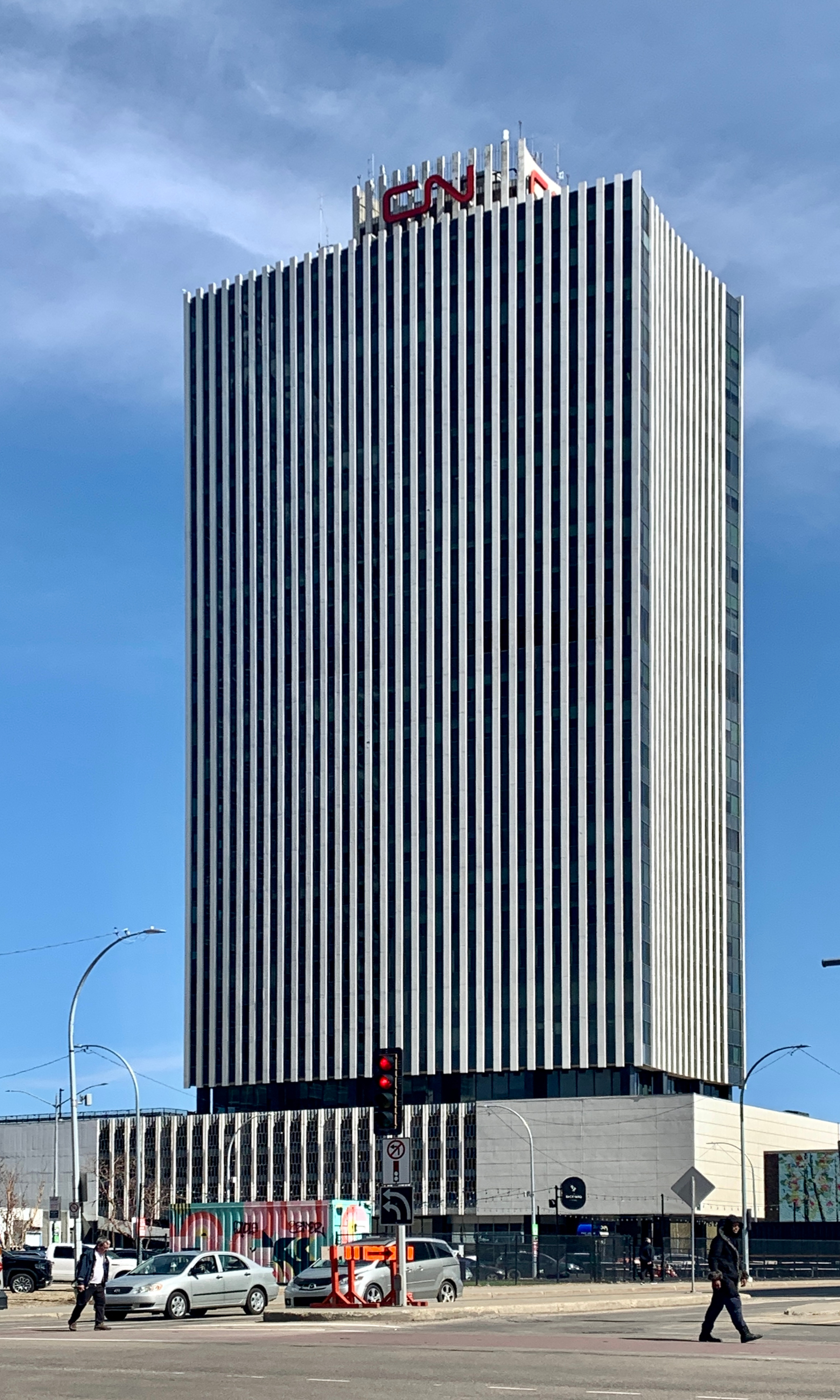
The CN Tower, with the Canadian National Railway logo above the roof

A major addition to Edmonton's skyline came in 1966, with the construction of the CN Tower, now often called Edmonton's first skyscraper. The Canadian National Railway Company had sought to build a new station, and revealed their plans for a new civic centre project in 1962. Built in the international style, it was the first building to exceed a height of 300 feet, as well as 100 metres (328 ft). Built to overlook the old Canadian National rail yard, the basement of the tower formerly housed Edmonton's main passenger railway station until 1998. Almost twice the height of the Alberta Legislature Building, it was also the tallest building west of Toronto upon completion. The first residential high-rises in Downtown also appeared in the 1960s, with the twenty-storey The Churchill and the 27-floor Mainstreet Tower both built in 1967.

Skyscraper construction increased rapidly in the 1970s. Work on the two-tower Telus Plaza complex (now renamed ATB Place) started in the late 1960s; the southern tower, AGT Tower (now Telus House Edmonton) became the tallest building in the city when it was completed in 1971. The complex was built to house the headquarters of Alberta Government Telephones, and continues to be used for telecommunication companies, as the provincial headquarters of Telus. The building's 33rd floor was home to Vista 33, a telephone and telecommunications museum, until 1993. The oil shocks of 1973 and 1979 encouraged more commercial towers in Downtown in the 1970s, such as 102A Tower (originally Royal Trust Tower), TD Tower, and MNP Tower (originally Oxford Tower). As with other North American cities at the time, these buildings were designed in the modernist style. Surpassing all of those in height was Edmonton House, an apartment tower that was the second tallest building in the city for most of the 1970s.

=== 1980s-1990s ===
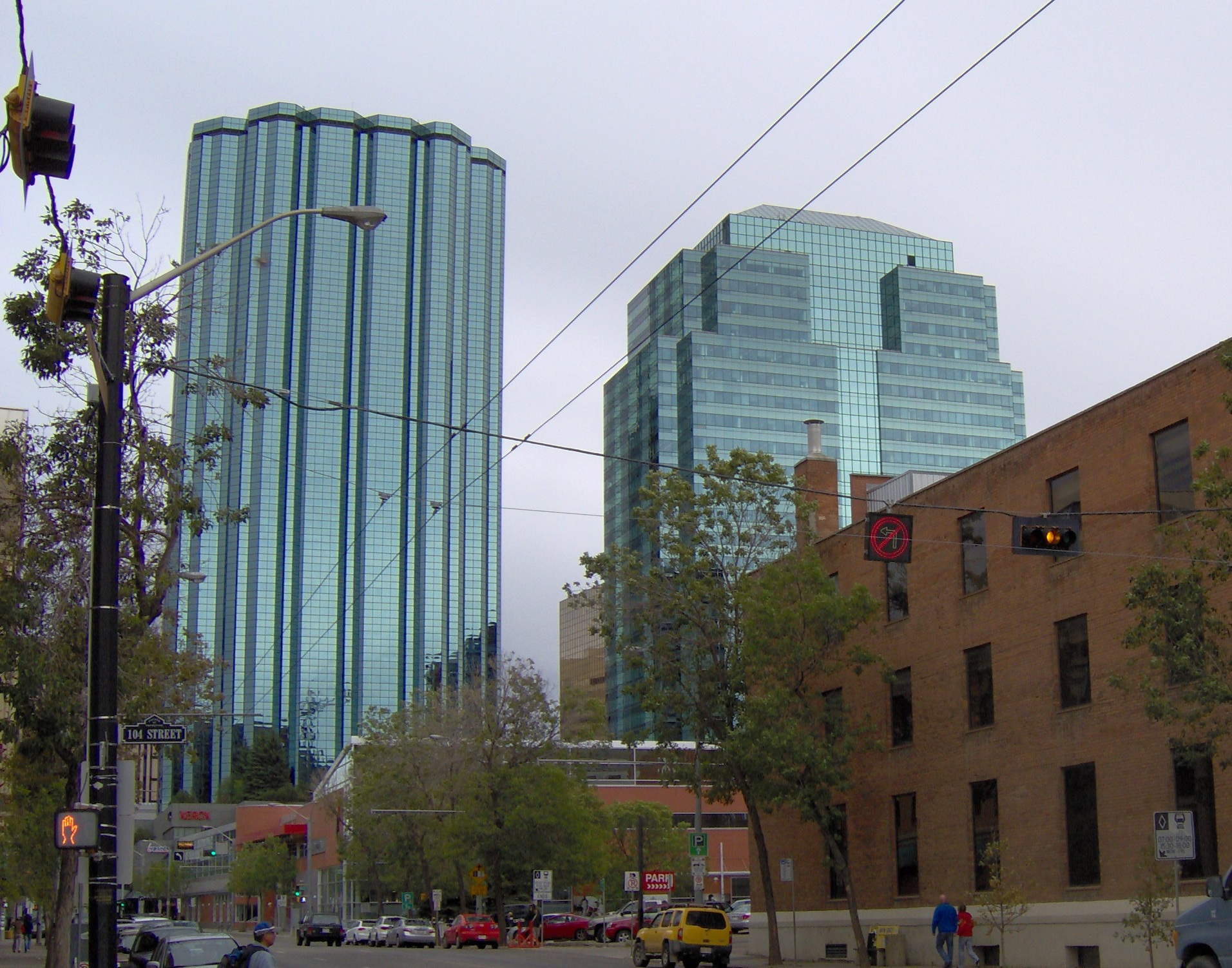
Manulife Place (left), pictured with Commerce Place (right)

The construction boom continued into the early 1980s, with significant developments including 10104 103 Ave (opened as the Canadian Commercial Bank Tower), Canadian Western Bank Place, and the Rice Howard complex, continuing the modernist architectural trend. This culminated in the completion of Manulife Place in 1983 at a cost of $100 million. The building became Edmonton's tallest building at 146.4 m (480 ft), a title it would retain for 28 years. However, by the mid-1980s, demand for commercial space in the city was severely weakened, partially due to the 1980s oil glut, affecting Edmonton's oil-dependent economy. Only 12 percent of the office space in Manulife Place was leased upon opening, due to the poor office leasing market.

As a result of the downturn, few commercial high-rises would be built in Edmonton over the next 20 years. One major exception is Commerce Place, which was completed in 1990 at 125 m (410 ft). The opening of the building's mall was also affected by the downturn, and was delayed to 1991; the developer, Olympia and York, went bankrupt in 1992 and plans for another skyscraper in the second phase were put on hold indefinitely. Also in 1992, the current city hall was completed, featuring a prominent 60 m (197 ft) clock tower.

=== 2000s–present ===
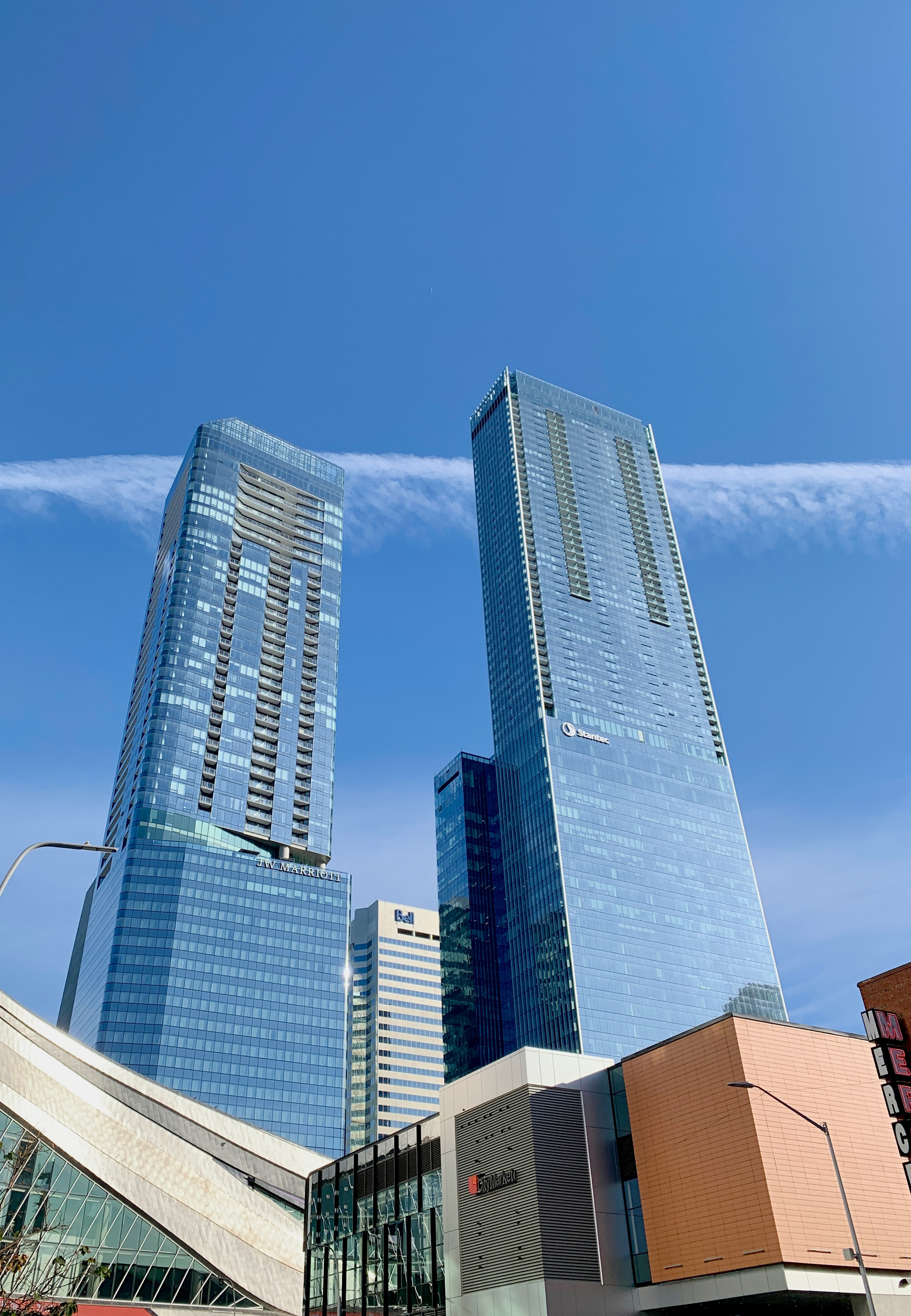
Edmonton's two tallest buildings, JW Marriott Edmonton (left) and Stantec Tower (right)

The 2000s saw a gradual resumption in high-rise construction, such as the residential towers One River Park and The Century in 2005, and The Jasper Properties in 2006. Icon II was completed in 2010, the first building to reach a height of 100 m (328 ft) since 1990, and continuing the increasing presence of residential high-rises downtown. It was soon followed by Epcor Tower, serving as the new headquarters of EPCOR Utilities, and the office skyscraper overtook Manulife Place as the city's tallest building in 2011.

Throughout the 2010s, Edmonton's skyline expanded significantly towards the northwest of downtown. In particular, the development of Ice District, centered around a new home arena for the Edmonton Oilers, Rogers Place, formed a new peak in the relatively flat skyline. The first skyscraper in the district to be built was Edmonton Tower in 2016. The second, JW Marriott Edmonton, is a mixed-use building with residential and hotel components. It became the city's tallest building when it topped out in the end of 2017, at a height of 191 m (627 ft). However, the building would only hold the title for less than a year, as Stantec Tower topped out in 2018 at a height of 248.9 m (816 ft). Housing the headquarters of consulting firm Stantec, it is remains the tallest building in Canada outside of Toronto. The new Walterdale Bridge across the North Saskatchewan River was completed in 2017, and is now often pictured with the skyline when viewed from the south.

Residential high-rises have also expanded the scope of the skyline. The Pearl, built in 2014 along Jasper Avenue, became the tallest building in the neighbourhood Wîhkwêntôwin (then known as Oliver) upon completion. Directly to its north, Citizen on Jasper was completed in 2024. Other residential developments such as The MacLaren (2019) and Glenora Park (2022) have brought the skyline towards the western end of Jasper Avenue, where it meets the river valley. The Parks, a two-tower residential complex, is planned to be built in between downtown and Wîhkwêntôwin, connecting the skyline further; the first tower was completed in 2024. The skyline has also grown southwards towards River Valley Victoria with high-rises such as The Hendrix (2016), The Augustana (2016), and The View (2024). Two new high-rises have been built near the University of Alberta in the 2020s: Laurent, a 20-story student housing tower in 2023, and The Eleanor, a 30-floor residential tower in 2024. The buildings are connected at the base, forming the Garneau Project. Eleanor is currently the tallest building in Garneau.

Edmonton passed a bylaw to upzone several areas of the city in 2025, allowing for taller buildings of up to 8 stories in certain residential neighbourhoods.

== Map of tallest buildings ==
The following map shows the location of buildings in Edmonton that are taller than 100 m (328 ft). Each marker is coloured by the decade of the building's completion.

Buildings taller than 100 m (328 ft) in Edmonton
- 1960s
- 1970s
- 1980s
- 1990s
- 2000s
- 2010s
- 2020s
1 Stantec Tower
2 JW Marriott Edmonton
3 Epcor Tower
4 National Bank Centre
5 Encore Tower
6 TELUS House Edmonton
7 10104 103 Ave
8 Edmonton Tower
9 Commerce Place
10 Edmonton House
11 The Pearl
12 The Parks I
13 Canadian Western Bank Place
14 MNP Tower
15 TD Tower
16 Rice Howard 1
17 Icon II
18 CN Tower
19 Enbridge Centre
20 Ultima
21 Citizen on Jasper
22 Sun Life Place
23 Fox Two
24 Hendrix
25 102A Tower

== Cityscape ==
Edmonton's skyline as of 2026, with the legislature building on the far left, Walterdale Bridge in the foreground, and Stantec Tower to the right.

== Tallest buildings ==
This list ranks completed buildings in Edmonton that stand at least 100 m (328 ft) tall as of 2026, based on standard height measurement. This includes spires and architectural details but does not include antenna masts. The “Year” column indicates the year of completion. Buildings tied in height are sorted by year of completion with earlier buildings ranked first, and then alphabetically.

Was the tallest building in Edmonton upon completion

| Rank | Name | Image | Location | Height m (ft) | Floors | Year | Purpose | Notes |
|---|---|---|---|---|---|---|---|---|
| 1 | Stantec Tower | Stantec Tower | Downtown 53°32′42″N 113°29′46″W | 248.9 (817) | 66 | 2019 | Mixed-use | Tallest building in Edmonton, in Alberta, and in Western Canada since 2019. Tallest building completed in Edmonton in the 2010s. |
| 2 | JW Marriott Edmonton | JW Marriott Edmonton | Downtown 53°32′44.7″N 113°29′45.9″W | 191 (627) | 56 | 2019 | Mixed-use | Tallest building in Edmonton from 2018 to 2019. |
| 3 | Epcor Tower | Epcor Tower | Downtown 53°32′50.9″N 113°29′34.4″W | 149.4 (490) | 28 | 2011 | Office | Tallest office building in Edmonton. Tallest building in Edmonton from 2011 to 2018. |
| 4 | National Bank Centre | Manulife Place | Downtown 53°32′33.6″N 113°29′39.8″W | 146.4 (480) | 36 | 1983 | Office | Formerly known as Manulife Place; named National Bank Centre in 2025. Tallest building in Edmonton from 1983 to 2011. Tallest building completed in Edmonton in the 1980s. |
| 5 | Encore Tower | Encore Tower | Downtown 53°32′34″N 113°29′53″W | 137.7 (452) | 43 | 2020 | Residential | Tallest fully residential building in Edmonton. Tallest building completed in Edmonton in the 2020s. |
| 6 | TELUS House Edmonton | TELUShouse | Downtown 53°32′24.3″N 113°29′29.1″W | 134.4 (441) | 33 | 1971 | Office | Tallest building in Edmonton from 1971 to 1983. Tallest building completed in Edmonton in the 1970s. |
| 7 | 10104 103 Ave | Bell Tower | Downtown 53°32′41.9″N 113°29′39.5″W | 129.9 (426) | 32 | 1982 | Office | Opened as the Canadian Commercial Bank Tower, also referred to as the CCB Tower. Known as the Canada Trust Tower from 1986 to 2000, and the Bell Tower from 2000 to 2026. |
| 8 | Edmonton Tower | Edmonton Tower | Downtown 53°32′44.5″N 113°29′40.7″W | 129.84 (426.0) | 29 | 2016 | Office | Also known as EAD Office Towr 1. |
| 9 | Commerce Place | Commerce Place | Downtown 53°32′31.1″N 113°29′42.4″W | 124.97 (410.0) | 30 | 1990 | Office | Tallest building completed in Edmonton in the 1990s. |
| 10 | Edmonton House | Edmonton House | Downtown 53°32′18.4″N 113°29′42.2″W | 121.1 (397) | 45 | 1971 | Residential | |
| 11 | The Pearl | The Pearl | Wîhkwêntôwin 53°32′26.3″N 113°31′43.2″W | 121 (397) | 36 | 2014 | Residential | Tallest building in Wîhkwêntôwin |
| 12 | The Parks I | The Parks I | Downtown 53°32′29.5″N 113°30′22.7″W | 121 (397) | 35 | 2025 | Residential | |
| 13 | Canadian Western Bank Place | CWB Place | Downtown 53°32′26.1″N 113°29′52.8″W | 120.6 (396) | 30 | 1980 | Office | |
| 14 | MNP Tower | MNP Tower | Downtown 53°32′42.6″N 113°29′34.5″W | 117.6 (386) | 27 | 1978 | Office | Originally known as Oxford Tower; renamed 101 Street Tower by 2013 and MNP Tower by early 2016. |
| 15 | TD Tower | TD Tower | Downtown 53°32′36.6″N 113°29′34.9″W | 116.7 (383) | 27 | 1976 | Office | |
| 16 | Rice Howard 1 | Scotia Place 1 | Downtown 53°32′29.7″N 113°29′33.4″W | 113.2 (371) | 28 | 1982 | Office | |
| 17 | Icon II | Icon Towers | Downtown 53.541832°N 113.49984°W | 112.3 (368) | 35 | 2010 | Residential | |
| 18 | CN Tower | CN Tower | Downtown 53°32′49.0″N 113°29′29.0″W | 110.9 (364) | 26 | 1966 | Office | Tallest building in Edmonton from 1966 to 1973. Tallest building completed in Edmonton in the 1960s. |
| 19 | Enbridge Centre | Enbridge Centre | Downtown 53°32′32.7″N 113°29′34.9″W | 110.6 (363) | 25 | 2016 | Office | |
| 20 | Ultima | Ultima | Downtown 53°32′38.4″N 113°29′52.3″W | 107.9 (354) | 32 | 2016 | Residential | |
| 21 | Citizen on Jasper | CNIB Tower | Wîhkwêntôwin 53°32′29″N 113°31′45″W | 107.9 (354) | 32 | 2023 | Residential | Also known as CNIB Tower. |
| 22 | Sun Life Place | Sun Life Place | Downtown 53°32′31.9″N 113°29′16.5″W | 107.7 (353) | 25 | 1978 | Office | |
| 23 | Fox Two | Fox Two | Downtown 53°32′35.9″N 113°29′59.1″W | 107.3 (352) | 33 | 2017 | Residential | |
| 24 | Hendrix | Hendrix | Wîhkwêntôwin 53°32′6.8″N 113°30′41.9″W | 103.6 (340) | 29 | 2016 | Residential | |
| 25 | 102A Tower | 102A Tower | Downtown 53°32′38.7″N 113°29′33.1″W | 102.9 (338) | 23 | 1974 | Office | Formerly known as Royal Trust Tower, Midland Walwyn Tower, Merrill Lynch Tower, City Centre Place, and Oxford Tower. |

== Tallest under construction or proposed ==
=== Under construction ===
The following table ranks high-rises that are under construction in Edmonton that are expected to be at least 100 m (328 ft) tall as of 2026, based on standard height measurement. The “Year” column indicates the expected year of completion. Buildings that are on hold are not included. Table entries with dashes (—) indicate that information regarding the exact building height or date of completion is not known.

| Name | Coordinates | Height m (ft) | Floors | Purpose | Year | Notes |
|---|---|---|---|---|---|---|
| Falcon Two | 53°32′19″N 113°30′5″W | 146 (479) | 30 | Residential | 2027 | |

=== Proposed ===
The following table ranks approved and proposed high-rises in Edmonton that are expected to be at least 100 m (328 ft) tall as of 2026, based on standard height measurement. The “Year” column indicates the tentative year of completion. Table entries with dashes (—) indicate that information regarding the exact building height or date of completion has not yet been released. Sources disagree on the name of some buildings, which may change before officially opening. Even if not indicated, heights may be estimated, and may change during construction – if construction gets underway.

| Name | Height m (ft) | Floors | Year | Status (Note: Approved by local zoning authorities, or proposed by developer, complete with date approval received or date proposal was announced by developer) | Notes |
|---|---|---|---|---|---|
| Alldritt Tower | 280.0 (919) | 80 | — | Approved (2017) | |
| 9955 Jasper | 184 (604) | 58 | — | Approved (2018) | |
| Massey Harris Ferguson Tower 3 | 150.0 (492.1) | 48 | — | Approved (2015) | |
| The Parks Tower 2 | 147.0 (482.3) | 45 | — | Approved | |
| Falcon One | 140.0 (459.3) | 30 | — | Approved (2018) | |
| Massey Harris Ferguson Tower 1 | 140.0 (459.3) | 45 | — | Approved (2015) | |
| Massey Harris Ferguson Tower 2 | 135.0 (442.9) | 42 | — | Approved (2015) | |
| The Shift Tower 1 | 113.08 (371.0) | 38 | — | Proposed (2018) | |
| The Shift Tower 2 | 106.68 (350.0) | 35 | — | Proposed (2018) | |
| The Clancey | 103 (338) | 28 | — | Approved (2019) | |

== Timeline of tallest buildings ==
| Name | Image | Years as tallest | Height | Floors |
|---|---|---|---|---|
| Tegler Building | Tegler Building | 1911–1913 | 24 m (79 ft) | 8 |
| Alberta Legislature Building | Alberta Legislature | 1913–1915 | 57 m (187 ft) | 5 |
| Hotel Macdonald Annex | Hotel Macdonald | 1915–1965 | 47.7 m (156 ft) | 11 |
| Garneau Towers | Garneau Towers | 1965–1966 | 58.42 m (191.7 ft) | 20 |
| CN Tower | CN Tower | 1966–1971 | 110.92 m (363.9 ft) | 26 |
| TELUS House (originally AGT Tower) | Telus House | 1971–1983 | 134.4 m (441 ft) | 33 |
| National Bank Centre (originally Manulife Place) | Manulife Place | 1983–2011 | 146.36 m (480.2 ft) | 36 |
| Epcor Tower | Epcor Tower | 2011–2017 | 149.35 m (490.0 ft) | 28 |
| JW Marriott Edmonton | JW Marriott Edmonton | 2017–2018 | 192.15 m (630.4 ft) | 56 |
| Stantec Tower | Stantec Tower | 2018–present | 250.9 m (823 ft) | 66 |

== See also ==
- List of tallest buildings in Canada
- List of tallest buildings in Alberta
- List of tallest buildings in Calgary
- Heritage buildings in Edmonton
