= Tegler Building =

Building in Alberta, Canada (1912–1982)

Coordinates: 53.5429°N 113.4933°W

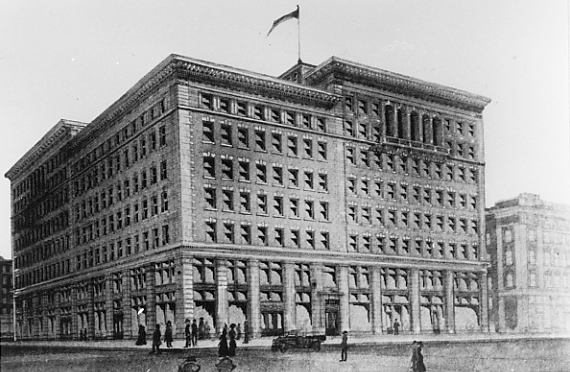
The Tegler Building

The Tegler Building was a historic office building in Edmonton, Alberta, Canada. When it was built in 1912, at 15,750 square metres, it was the largest building in western Canada. It was designated a historic resource in November 1981, but then in a motion from city council that designation was rescinded. The building was imploded on December 12, 1982.

== History ==
Robert Tegler was an entrepreneur and businessman who came to Edmonton in the early 1900s. He saw opportunity in Edmonton and decided to erect the Tegler Building at the corner of what was then known as Elizabeth Street and First Street (now 102 Avenue and 101 Street). The building site was at 10189 101 Street NW. Herbert Alton Magoon was hired to design a six-storey building, 30 metres (100 ft) long, 21 metres (70 ft) wide and 24 metres (80 ft) high. Construction started in 1911 and was completed in early 1912. An expansion to the Tegler building was needed by 1913 and so Robert Tegler started construction on the third floor over top of the Edmonton Journal building, eventually building down to ground level when the Edmonton Journal moved.

While the Tegler Building was taken down in 1982, parts of the historic building live on in The Tegler Foundation and its subsequent buildings. The Tegler Manor – constructed in 1982 – houses many of the original bricks from the building, as well as the mural by Ernest Huber depicting early life in Alberta which once graced the lobby above the elevators in the original building.

Preceded by	Tallest Building in Edmonton; 1911–1913; 24 metres (80 ft)	Succeeded by Alberta Legislature Building
