= Edmonton Tower =

Office building in Alberta, Canada

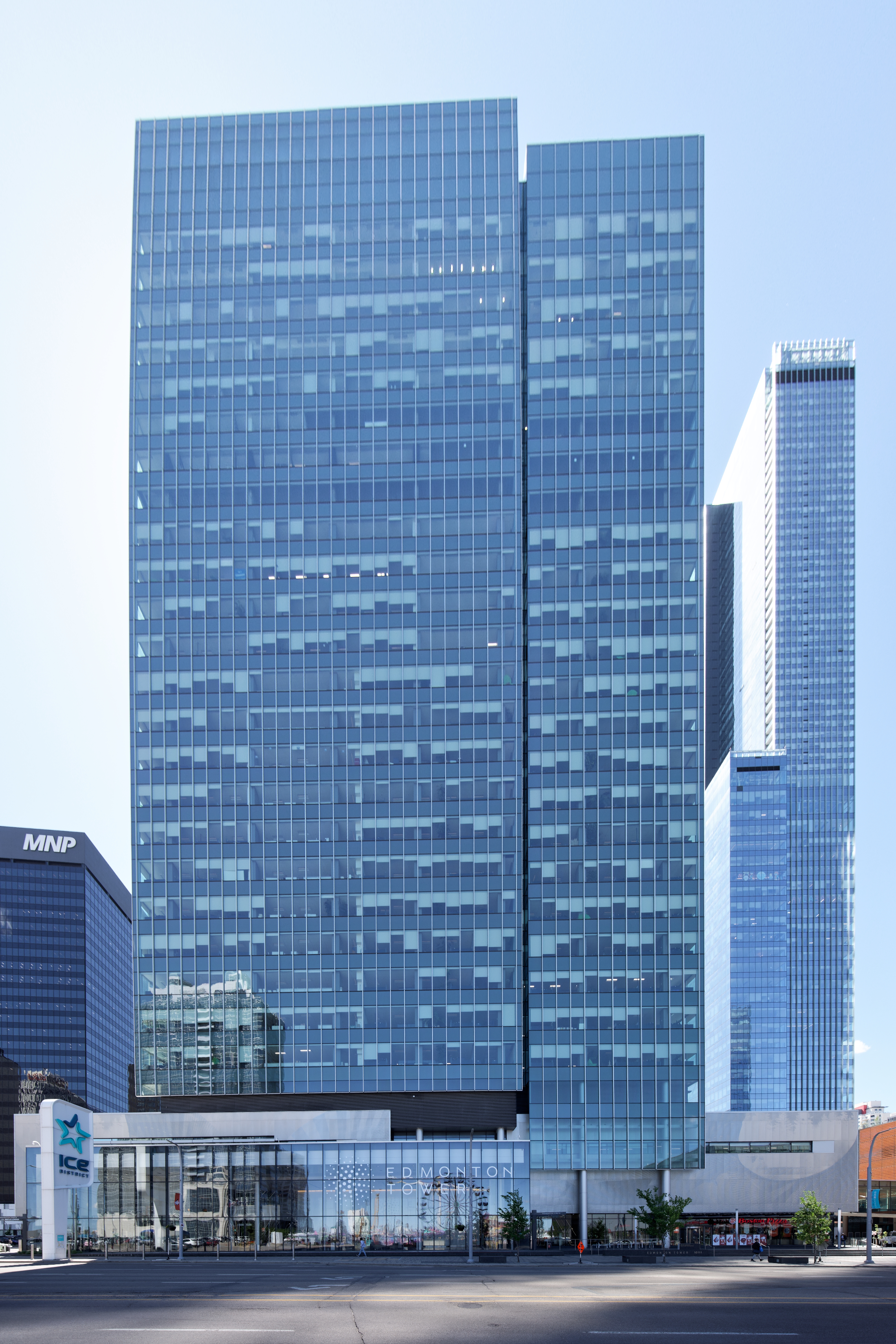
- Edmonton Tower in 2024
- Interactive map of the Edmonton Tower area
- Alternative names: City of Edmonton Tower, Edmonton Arena District Office Tower, EAD Office Tower 1

General information
- Status: Completed
- Type: Government, commercial
- Architectural style: Modern architecture
- Location: 10111 104 Avenue; Edmonton, Alberta, Canada
- Coordinates: 53°32′44.4″N 113°29′40.8″W
- Construction started: May 13, 2014
- Completed: December 2016
- Cost: Over $300 million ($384 million in 2025 dollars)
- Owner: Katz Group

Height
- Roof: 129.84 m (426.0 ft)

Technical details
- Floor count: 29

Design and construction
- Architect: Stantec
- Developer: Stantec, ONE Properties
- Structural engineer: Stantec

Edmonton Tower is a 29-storey 129.84-metre (426.0 ft) tall, office building in the Ice District area of Edmonton, Alberta, Canada. It opened in mid-December 2016. In total, it has 3,700 square metres (40,000 ft^{2}) of retail space, and over 48,000 square metres (520,000 ft^{2}) of office lease-able area. It is Edmonton's eighth tallest building.

== Major tenants ==
The main tenants have been:

- City of Edmonton - floor 3 and floors 5 to 19, opened with tower.
- Kids & Company - floor 4 for a child care centre with a total area of 579 square metres (6,230 ft^{2}), opened with tower.
- RBC Dominion Securities - floors 22 and 23, opened 2018.

=== Other tenants ===
- Sorrell Financial - opened early 2017.

== Video display ==
A large video display, using light-emitting diodes, shows images on the exterior glass of the top four storeys of the tower. The display was installed during construction and first used in January 2017. The building's developer, One Properties, stated that the Oilers Entertainment Group was involved with the project.

== See also ==
- List of tallest buildings in Edmonton
