= Stantec Tower =

Skyscraper in Edmonton, Canada (opened 2018)

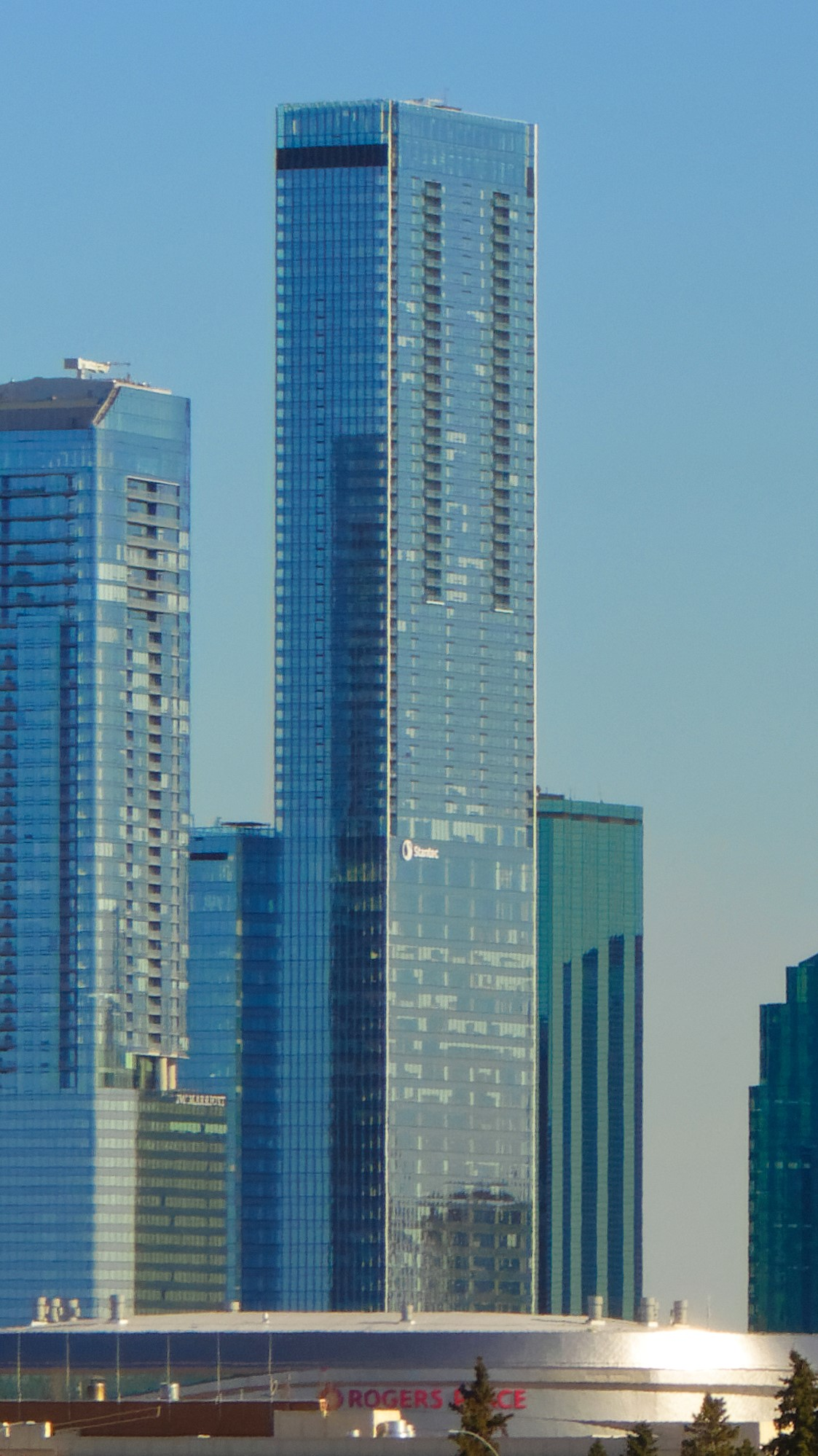

- Location within Edmonton

General information
- Status: Completed
- Type: Office, residential
- Location: Edmonton, Alberta, Canada
- Coordinates: 53°32′42″N 113°29′46″W
- Construction started: 2014
- Completed: 2018 (office), 2019 (residential)
- Opening: September 26, 2018
- Cost: CA$500 million ($604 million in 2025 dollars)
- Owner: ICE District Joint Ventures, Deka Immobilien

Height
- Roof: 250.8 m (823 ft)

Technical details
- Floor count: 66

Design and construction
- Architect: Stantec
- Developer: ICE District Joint Ventures: ONE Properties, Katz Group Properties
- Structural engineer: Stantec

Website
- www.stantec.com/en/projects/canada-projects/s/stantec-tower-edmonton

Stantec Tower is a 66-story building and 4 underground, 250.8-metre (823-foot) mixed-use skyscraper in Ice District in the downtown core of Edmonton, Alberta, Canada. On May 23, 2018, it reached a construction height of 197 metres (646 ft) and surpassed the JW Marriott Edmonton Ice District & Residences, becoming the tallest building in Edmonton and one of the largest mixed-use projects in Canada. The office area of the tower opened on September 26, 2018, and the residential portion opened in 2019.

At 250.9 metres (823 ft) tall, the Stantec Tower is the 9th-tallest building in Canada, as well as the tallest in Canada outside Toronto, Ontario. The 66-storey tower consists of retail space, offices, and 454 residential units. It houses the headquarters of Stantec and is located close to Rogers Place, home of the NHL's Edmonton Oilers, and near the centre of Ice District directly northwest of Downtown Edmonton.

== Construction ==
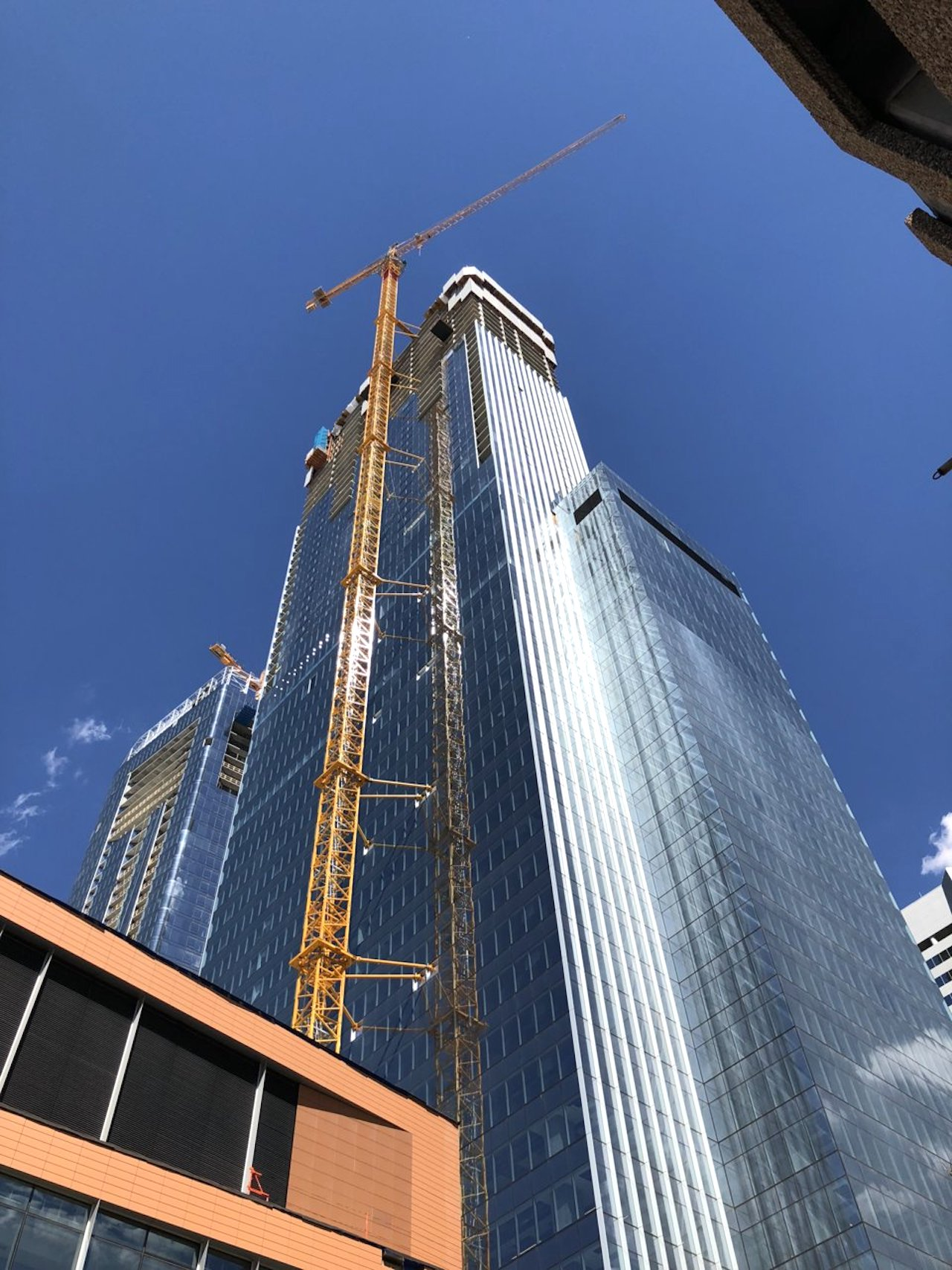
Stantec Tower (right) June 2018, three weeks after passing its neighbour, JW Marriott Edmonton Ice District & Residences (left, interior construction then ongoing), to become the tallest building in Edmonton.

Engineering and design work was completed by Stantec themselves and unveiled to the public on August 26, 2014. The initial design consisted of 62 storeys at a height of 224 metres (735 ft). However, the finalized design of the tower would consist of 66-storeys at a height of 251 metres (823 ft).

Construction started in the fall of 2014, completing foundation works and moving above grade in August 2016. The project reached a milestone when it topped out the 30th floor, marking the top of the commercial and office floors, in November 2017.

Stantec Tower had reached its 30th floor just 14 days after its next door neighbour, JW Marriott Edmonton Ice District & Residences, had become the tallest building in Edmonton. Both these construction projects continued adding floors, with the JW Marriott Edmonton Ice District & Residences reaching its full height (192.15 metres or 630.4 feet) in March 2018. Stantec Tower added structural steel for its 54th floor on May 23, 2018, bringing its height to 197 metres (646 ft) and becoming the tallest building in Edmonton, and work continued upward on the residential floors at a rate of 3 metres (9.8 ft) per week.

The tower opened on September 26, 2018, with employees of commercial tenants moving in to occupy 29 floors in October 2018. On November 16, 2018 the tower was fully topped out, becoming the tallest building in Canada outside of Toronto. Dismantling of the crane took place in March 2019, as work on the SKY residences neared completion, with residents expected to move in starting in the fall. The tower was completed in 2019. In November of that year, it was announced that, due to poor sales, the bottom 12 floors of the planned SKY residences would be converted into hotel space. Existing owners in the affected units would be upgraded to higher floors at no additional cost. However, following a residential market demand shift in the city that was caused by the COVID-19 pandemic, the 12 floors that were planned for the hotel were converted into rental units in October 2020.

== Major tenants ==
In September 2019, Stantec sold the 29 floors of commercial space to German real estate company Deka Immobilien, a subsidiary of DekaBank. The sale was facilitated by the high commercial occupancy, including:

- PwC Canada – two floors – 4,738 square metres (51,000 ft^{2})
- Dentons Canada – 3 floors (Floors 24, 25, and 26) Q2 of 2019.
- Stantec
- DLA Piper

== Maintenance issues ==
In 2021 and 2022, multiple sections of glass fell from the building onto the surrounding streets. After the incidents, Ice District Shared Facilities has installed a protective film, described as a plastic film cut to fit each window and frame, to keep the glass in place.

== See also ==
- List of tallest buildings in Edmonton
- List of tallest buildings in Canada

Preceded by JW Marriott Edmonton	Tallest building in Edmonton; 2018–present 250.8 m (823 ft)	Succeeded by Incumbent
