= PCL Construction =

Construction company group

Coordinates: 39.680229°N 104.939385°W

- Type: Private (employee-owned)
- Industry: Construction
- Founded: 1906 (incorporated in 1913 as Poole Construction Company Limited)
- Headquarters: North America
- Number of employees: 5,500; more than 10,000 hourly tradespeople
- Website: www.pcl.com

The PCL family of companies is a group of independent general contracting construction companies in Canada, the United States, Australia, and the Caribbean.

== History ==
PCL began operations in 1906 as Martin and Poole Construction, founded by James Martin and Ernest Edward Poole (October 18, 1883 – March 12, 1964) in Stoughton, Saskatchewan. Poole and Martin both returned to their homes on Prince Edward Island for the winter of 1906–07, and Martin decided to remain and retire. Poole continued the company upon his return to Saskatchewan in spring 1907, and he changed the company name to E.E. Poole Contractors.

In 1913, Poole renamed the company to Poole Construction Company Limited. In 1932, the company was moved to its current corporate headquarters in Edmonton, Alberta.

In 1975, the company opened its U.S. head office in Denver, Colorado. Ernest Poole's sons, John Edward (1917–2007) and George Ernest (1921–1997), sold the company in 1977 to their 25 senior managers and Great West Life. Poole Construction Company Limited changed its name to PCL Construction Ltd. in 1979. The company is now 100% employee-owned and is led by President and Chief Executive Officer Chris Gower, who assumed the role in November 2024.

PCL Construction has completed notable sporting venues such as Staples Center (Crypto.com) in 1999, Home Depot Center (Dignity Health Sports Park) in 2003, UCLA Pauley Pavilion renovation in 2012, and BMO Stadium in 2018. PCL Construction has been involved in California theme parks including the Simpsons Springfield at Universal Studios Hollywood in 2015, Wizarding World of Harry Potter at Universal Studios Hollywood in 2016, Castle Hotel at Legoland in 2018, World of Disney Store in Downtown Disney in 2018, and Super Nintendo World at Universal Studios Hollywood in 2023.
