= Commerce Place (Edmonton) =

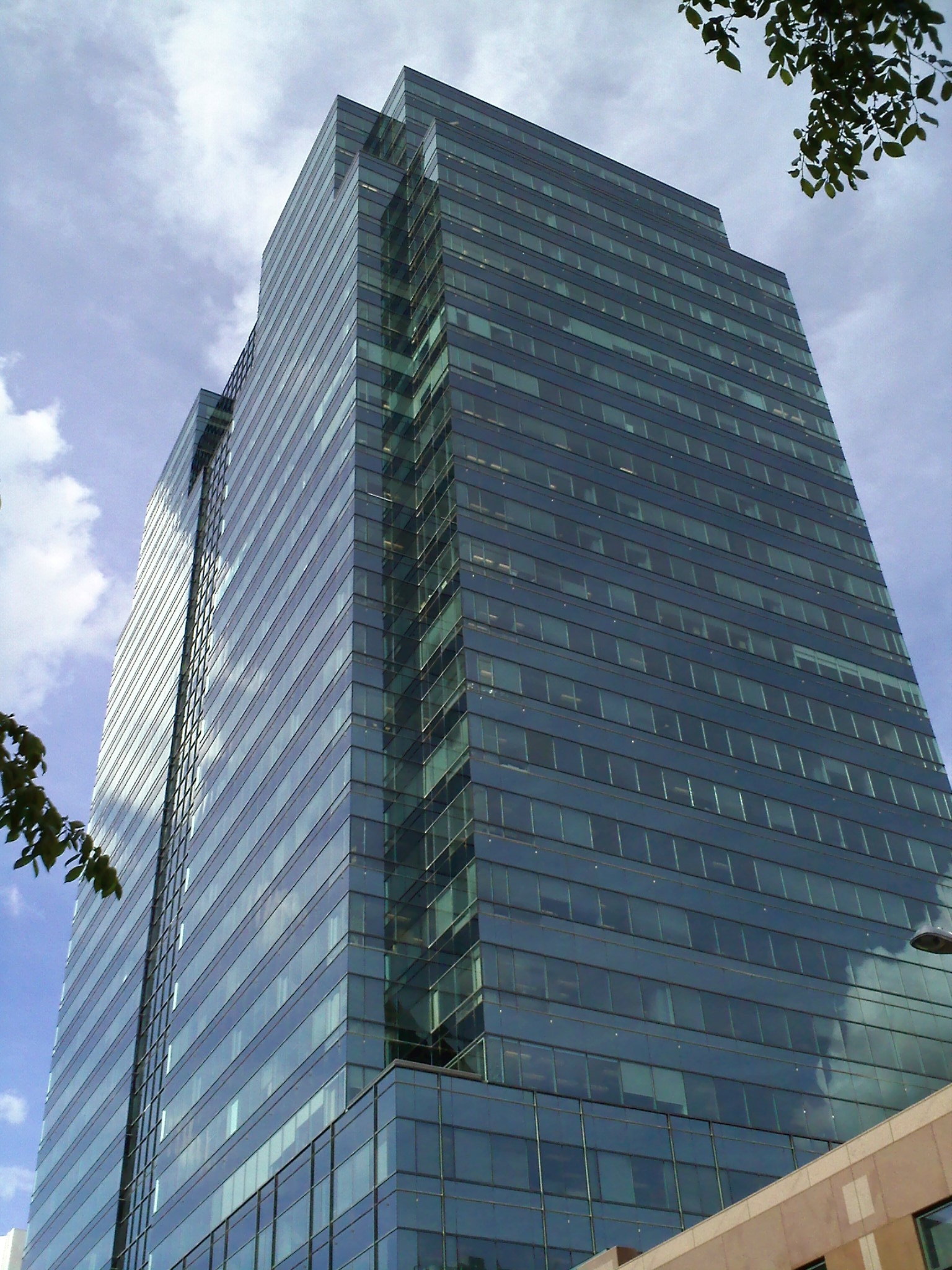
- Commerce Place from street level in June 2010

- Location within Edmonton
- Former names: CityCentre (1990–1994)

General information
- Type: Office, retail
- Location: 10155 102 Street NW; Edmonton, Alberta; T5J 4G8
- Coordinates: 53°32′29″N 113°29′41″W
- Construction started: 1987
- Completed: 1990
- Opening: January 1990
- Cost: $165 million (CAD)
- Owner: British Columbia Investment Management Corporation
- Operator: QuadReal

Height
- Roof: 124.97 m (410.0 ft)

Technical details
- Floor count: 30
- Floor area: 753,956 sq ft (70,044.8 m^{2})

Design and construction
- Architects: Adamson Associates; Schmidt Feldberg Croll Henderson Architects
- Developer: Olympia and York
- Main contractor: EllisDon

Other information
- Public transit: 102 Street stop

Commerce Place is an office and retail complex in Edmonton, Alberta, Canada. The complex's skyscraper stands at 125 m (410 ft) or 27 storeys tall and was completed in 1990. Commerce Place has a small selection of shops in the main levels of the mall and is connected to Edmonton City Centre and Manulife Place by pedway.

Commerce Place is also home to the Edmonton Consular Post, a satellite of the Italian Consulate in Vancouver.

== History ==
In December 1986, Toronto-based developer Olympia and York revealed that they had acquired property north of Jasper Avenue and south of Manulife Place between 101 and 102 Street. The following year, Olympia and York announced plans for an 1.35 million square foot project, then called CityCentre, in downtown Edmonton that would consist of twin skyscrapers and a shopping mall. The project would be built in phases with 1.2 million square foot in office space and 150,000 square foot of retail space planned. Construction of phase one began in fall 1987 with the 27-storey skyscraper opening in January 1990. The complex's shopping mall was originally scheduled to open in the spring of 1990. However, due to the lack of tenants, its opening was repeatedly delayed and ultimately postponed until the fall of 1991. In 1992, Olympia and York went bankrupt and in June 1993 sold the complex to Canadian Imperial Bank of Commerce. Plans for phase two, which would have incorporated the CIBC branch at the corner of 101 Street and Jasper Avenue into the complex and constructing a second skyscraper, were put on hold indefinitely due to a downturn of the commercial real estate market at the time. The complex was renamed Commerce Place in January 1994.

== See also ==
- List of tallest buildings in Edmonton
