= Czech cuisine =

Culinary traditions of the Czech Republic

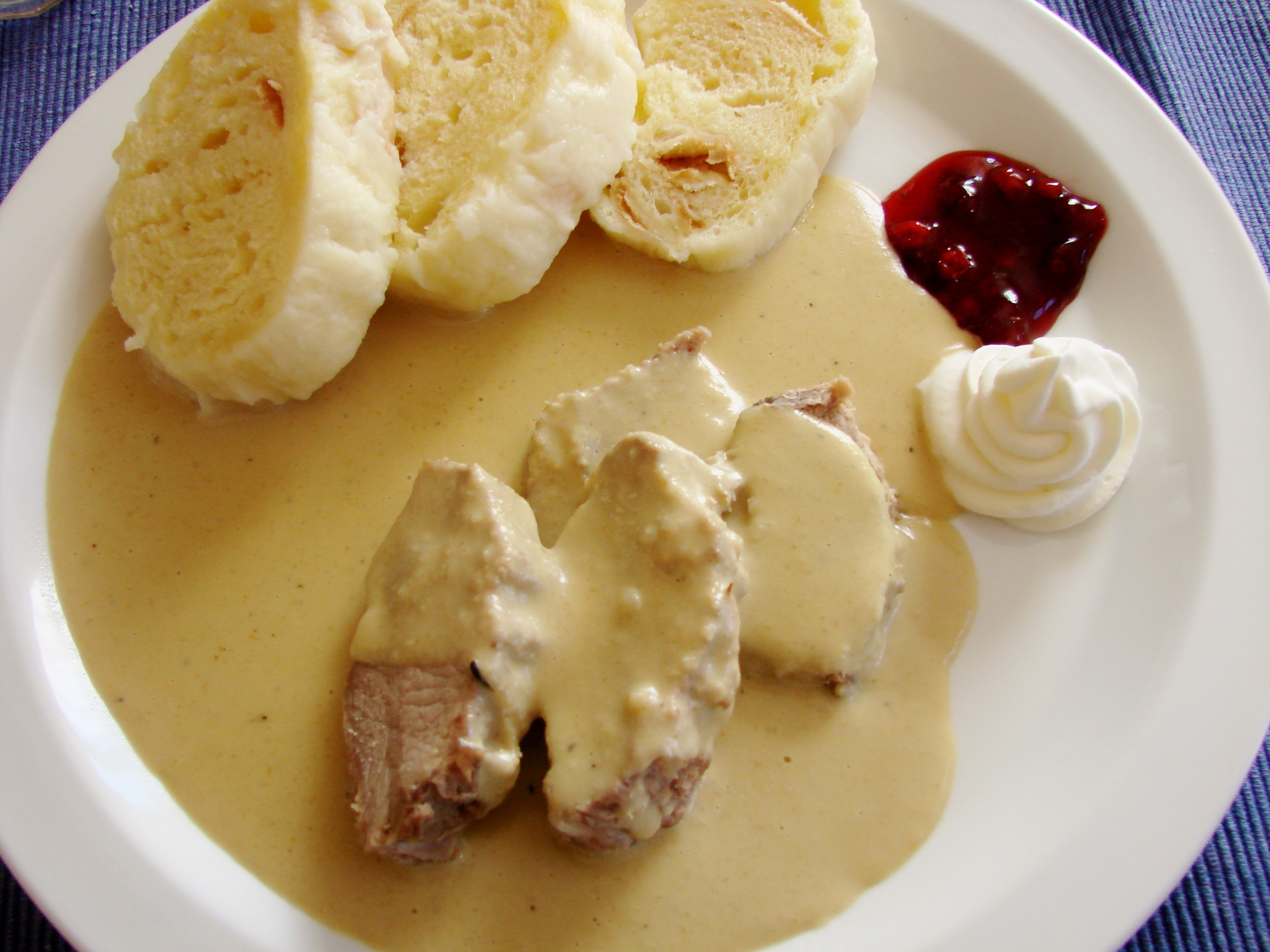
Svíčková na smetaně served with dumplings, whipped cream and cranberries

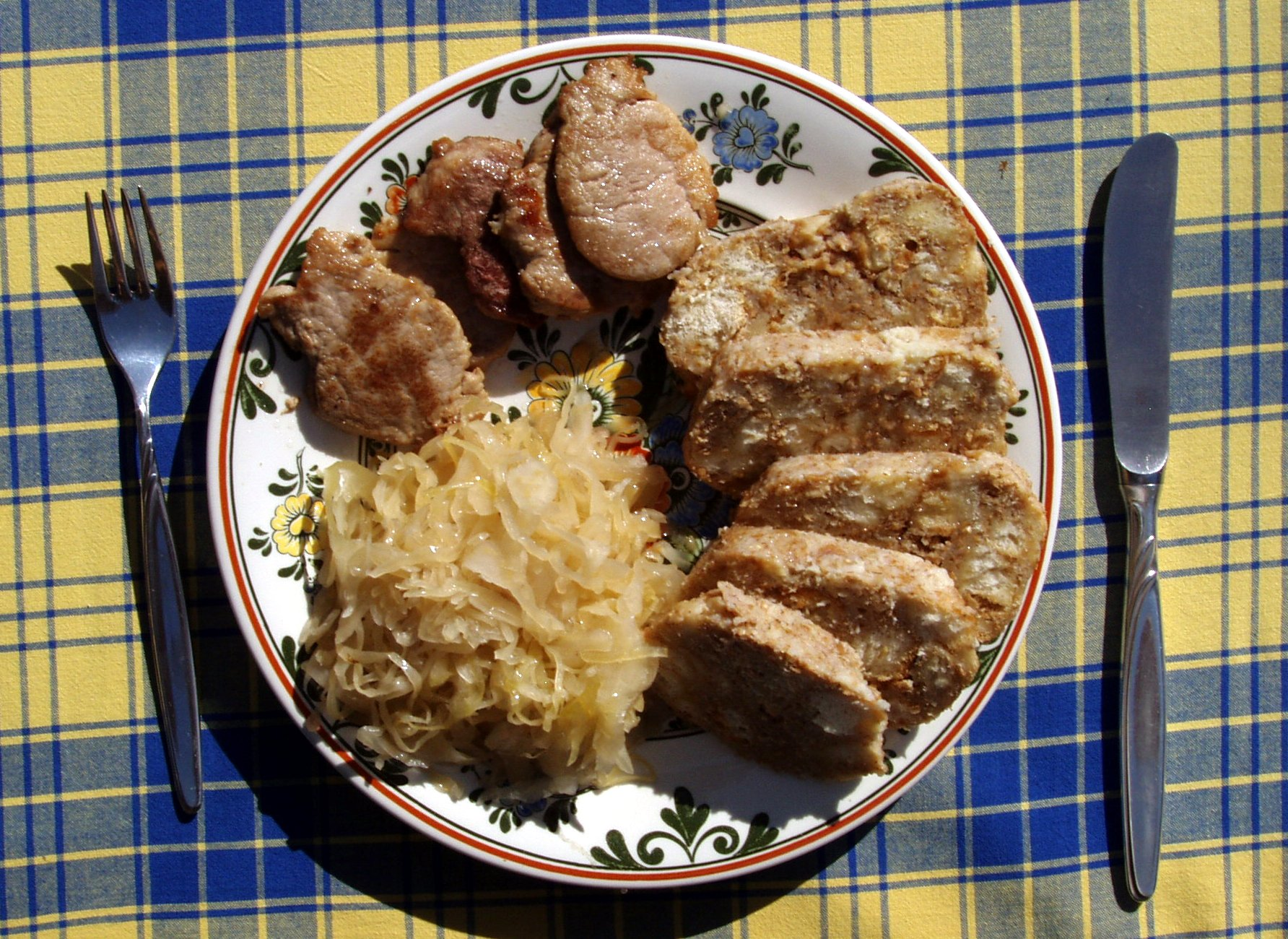
Vepřo knedlo zelo (roast pork with dumplings and sauerkraut)

Czech cuisine includes a variety of staples, dishes, beverages, and snacks which are typical of the broader Central European region. Many dishes are heavily influenced by historical shifts in the availability of various ingredients, particularly during the communist era of Czechoslovakia. Due to Czechia's central location in Europe, recipes were exchanged by ethnic minorities, new settlers, in border towns, leading to a cuisine with amorphous borders and regional dishes spreading beyond Czech lands. Recipes also served as cultural capital, playing a role in the building of communities and of relationships between these communities.

The body of Czech meals typically consists of at least two courses; the first course traditionally being soup, and the second course being the main dish. Third courses often consisted of a sweet dessert or compote (kompot) on more festive occasions.

In Czech cuisine, thick soups are accompanied by stewed vegetables and meats in gravies and cream sauces. Czech cuisine has a reputation for having sweeter main courses than dishes in surrounding countries. Meals are often accompanied by alcoholic drinks such as beer or wine.

== History ==
The 19th-century Czech language cookbook Pražská kuchařka by Karolína Vávrová shows influences of French cuisine in the order of multi-course meals common throughout the Habsburg monarchy, beginning with soup, followed by fish entrees, meat and sweets. Vávrová deviates from this standard order for the sweets of Mehlspeisen type. These flour-based sweets, including baked puddings, strudels, doughnuts and souffles could be served either before or after the roast meats, but stewed fruits, creamy desserts, cakes, ice cream, and cookies were to always be served after the roast and for multiple dessert courses would follow this stated order.

After gaining independence from Austria-Hungary, early Czechoslovakia featured as a period of cultural exchange between Czechia and Slovakia. Dishes from Slovakia such as halušky and bryndza increased their spread in Czechia. The latter part of Czechoslovakia's culinary history was marked by austerity measures put in place during the communist era. The focus of Czech cuisine shifted towards heavy dishes featuring few but reliable and filling ingredients. However, the development of Czech cuisine was not stagnant, as proximity to other countries in the Eastern Bloc also facilitated the movement of cuisine and culinary traditions across the region.

After the fall of the communist regime and separation of Czechia from Slovakia, new products and ingredients entered the Czech market, though many communist-era products (e.g. Kofola, Malinovka) retained popularity. Czech culinary identity was also called back into question during the modern era, as many sought to reconnect with pre-socialist culinary roots despite the loss of many culinary traditions through austerity.

== Diet ==
Although Czech cuisine has a reputation for the heavy presence of meats and starches, the Czech diet has slowly shifted towards incorporating more fruits, vegetables, and dairy products in the daily diet. The proportion of the diet consisting of wheat products and potatoes has decreased, while meat consumption has decreased slightly and shifted away from red meats towards leaner meats such as poultry.

Foraging and hunting play a role, particularly in the diet of rural communities. Mushrooms are often used in Czech cuisine and are often foraged in the autumn. Boletes are among the most commonly picked mushrooms. Berries are also foraged, including blueberries, cranberries, and raspberries/blackberries.

== Soup ==
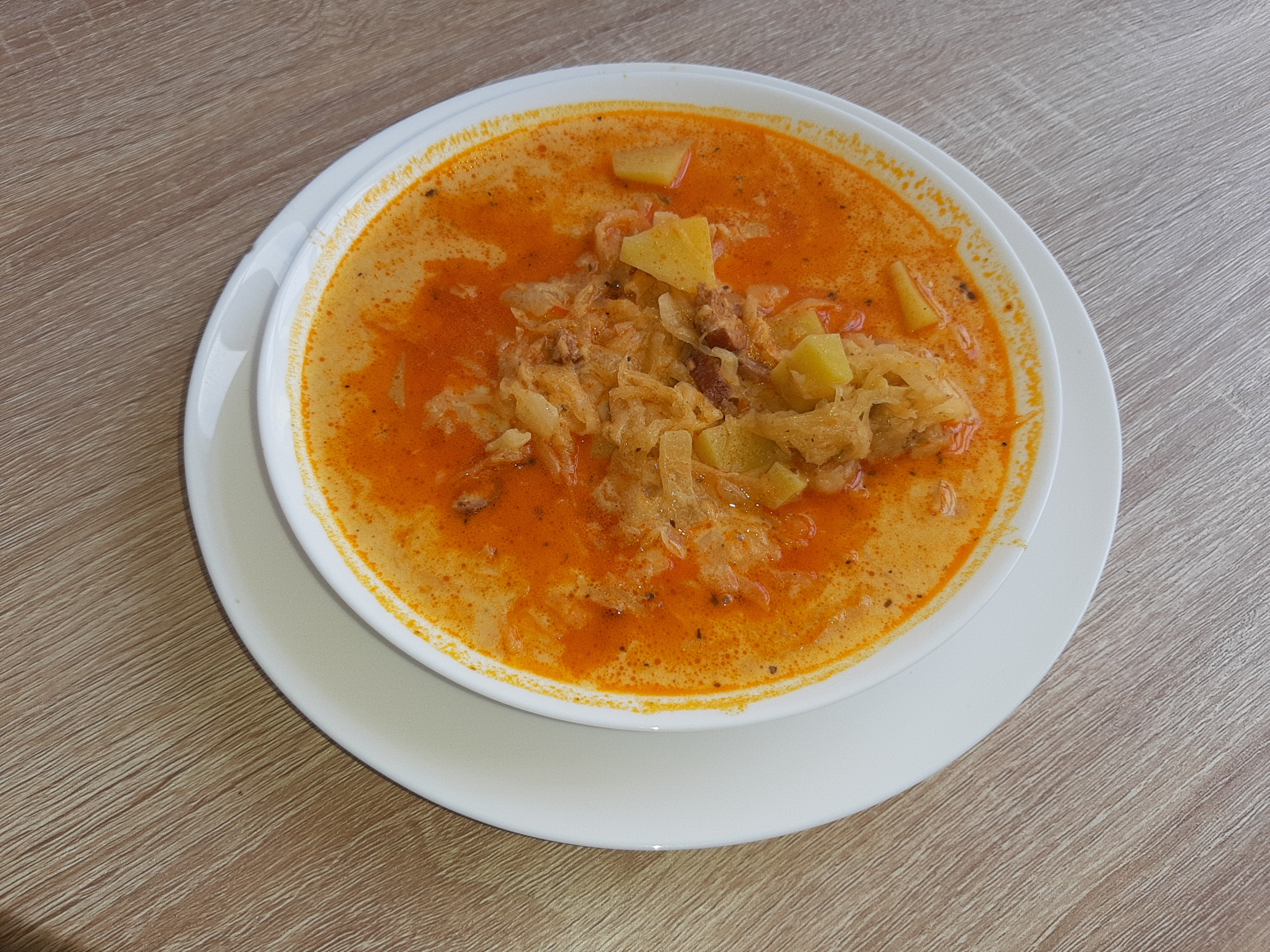
Zelňačka (cabbage soup)

Soup (polévka, colloquially polívka) plays an important role in Czech cuisine. Soups commonly found in Czech restaurants feature beef, chicken or vegetable broth with noodles—optionally served with liver or nutmeg dumplings. Garlic soup (česnečka) with croutons is also served—optionally with minced sausage, raw egg, or cheese. Cabbage soup (zelňačka) made from sauerkraut is also common—sometimes served with minced sausage. Kyselica is a Wallachian variety and contains sour cream, bacon, potatoes, eggs and sausage.

Pea (hrachovka), bean and lentil soups are commonly cooked at home. Goulash soup (gulášovka) and dršťková are made from beef or pork tripe cut into small pieces and cooked with other ingredients. The meat in these soups can be substituted with oyster mushrooms. Potato soup (bramboračka) is made from potato, onion, carrot, root parsley and celeriac, spiced with caraway seeds, garlic and marjoram. Fish soup (rybí polévka) made with carp is a traditional Christmas dish. Other common Czech soups include tomato soup, vegetable soup, onion soup (cibulačka), bread soup, and champignon or other mushroom soup.

Kulajda is a traditional South Bohemian soup containing water, cream, spices, mushrooms, egg (often a quail's egg), dill and potatoes. It is distinct in its thickness, white colour and dill-forward flavour. The main ingredient is mushrooms, which feature as the main flavour in the dish.

Kyselo is a regional specialty soup made from rye sourdough, mushrooms, caraway and fried onion.

== Side dishes ==
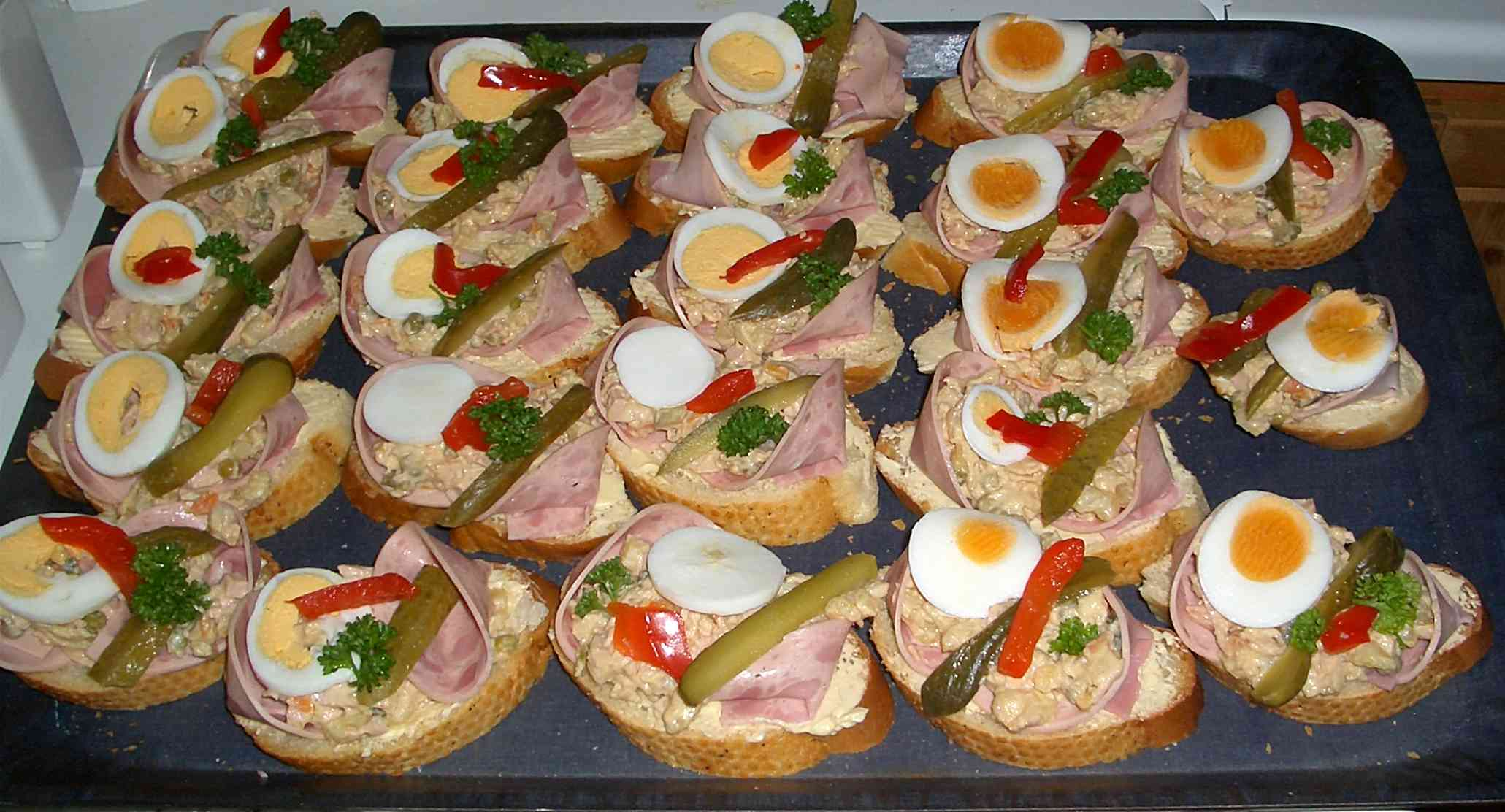
Obložené chlebíčky, a type of snack or appetizer

Bread dumplings (knedlíky) which are steamed and sliced like bread, are one of the mainstays of Czech cuisine and are typically served with meals. They can be either wheat or potato-based and are sometimes made from a combination of wheat flour and diced up stale bread or rolls. Puffed rice can be found in store-bought mixes. When served as leftovers, sliced dumplings are sometimes pan-fried with eggs.

Potatoes feature a prominent role as various side dishes accompanying meats and vegetables. Potatoes are served boiled with salt, often with caraway seed and butter. Peeled and boiled potatoes are mixed into mashed potatoes. Smaller Czech dumplings are usually potato-based. Czech potato dumplings are often filled with uzené (smoked meat) and served with spinach or sauerkraut. Fried onion and braised cabbage can accompany these dumplings.

Buckwheat, pearl barley and millet grains are rarely served in restaurants. These are more commonly cooked at home as a healthier alternative to potatoes and wheat-based dumplings.

== Breads and pastries ==
Bread (chléb or chleba) typically consists of sourdough baked from rye and wheat, and flavoured with salt, caraway seeds, onion, garlic, seeds, or pork crackling. It is eaten as an accompaniment to soups and dishes. This bread is used to make Czech croutons and for topinky—slices of bread fried in a pan on both sides and rubbed with garlic.

Rolls (rohlík), buns (žemle), and braided buns (houska) are the most common forms of bread eaten for breakfast; these are often topped with poppy seeds and salt or other seeds. A bun or a roll baked from bread dough is called a dalamánek. A sweet roll or loupák is a crescent-shaped roll made from sweetened dough containing milk. It is smeared with egg and sprinkled with poppy seeds before baking, giving it a golden-brown colour.

== Meat dishes ==
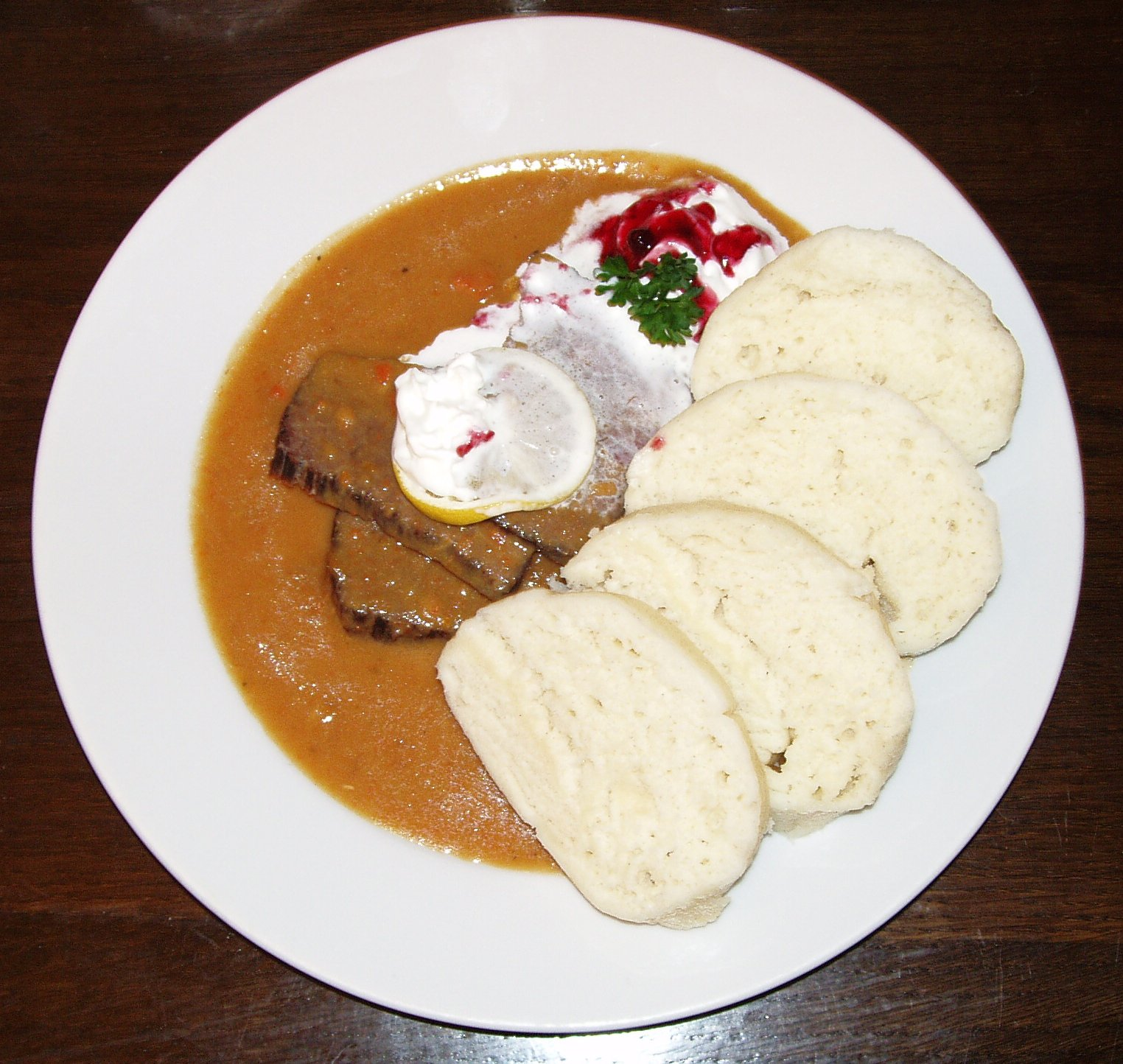
Svíčková na smetaně (marinated tenderloin), served here with dumplings and cream

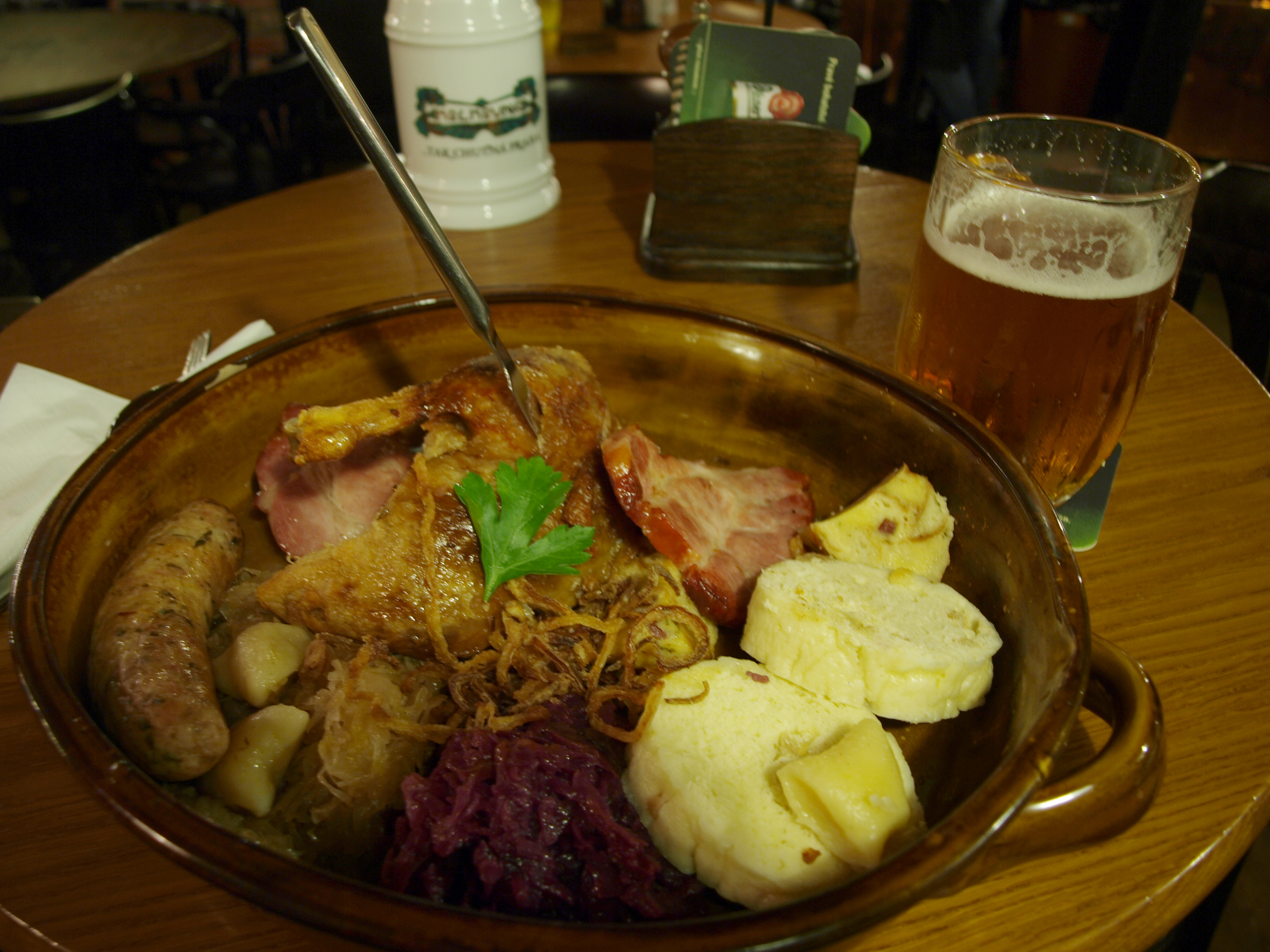
A "traditional Bohemian platter" at a restaurant in central Prague, consisting of roast duck, roast pork, beer sausage, smoked meat, red and white cabbage, bread, bacon and potato dumplings

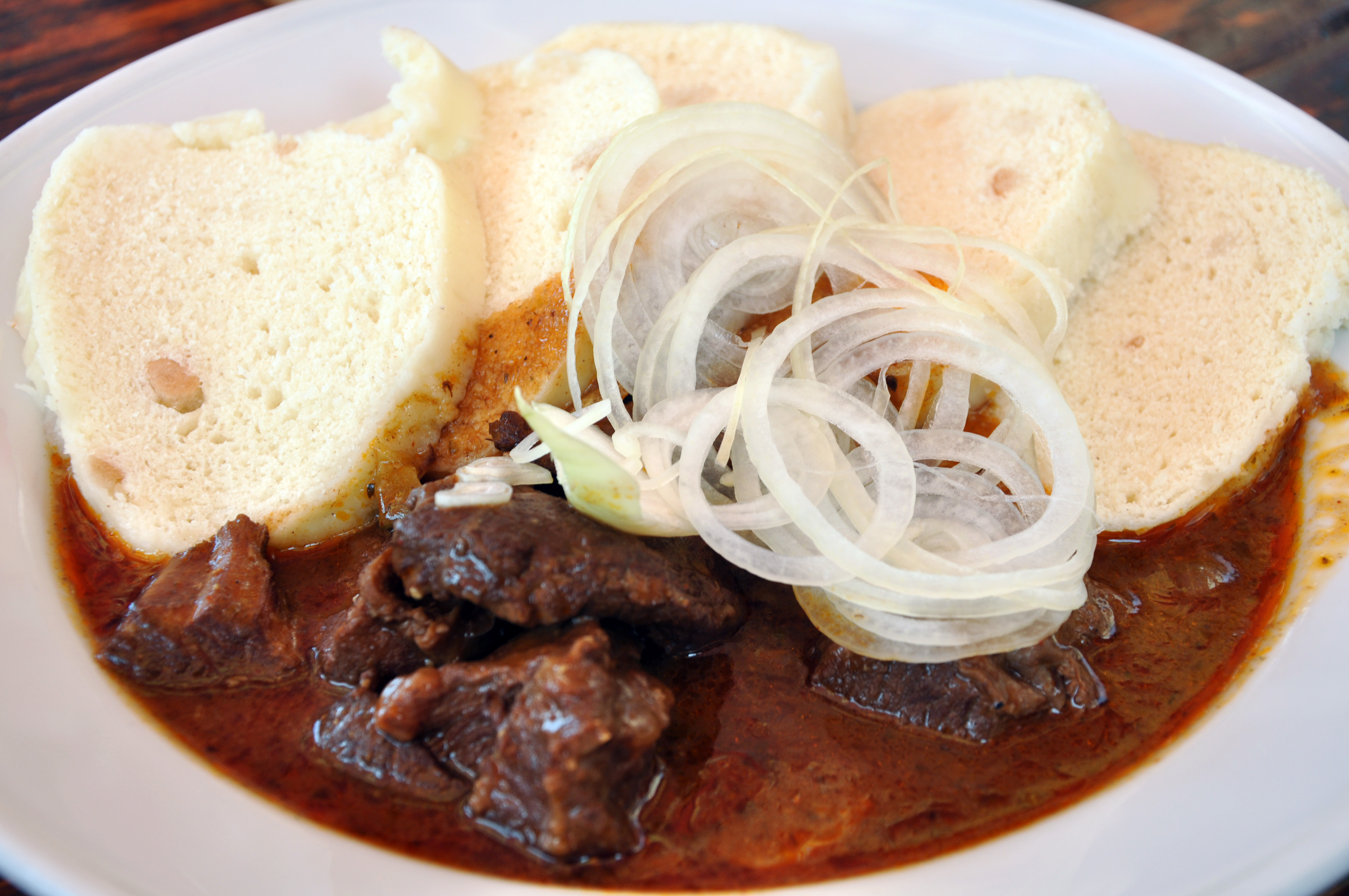
Prague-style beef goulash

Pork is the most commonly consumed meat, making up over half of all meat consumption in the country. Many parts of the pig are consumed to reduce wastage. Pork cracklings (škvarky), ham (šunka) and bacon (slanina) are commonly eaten. Some dishes are cooked following a pig slaughter (zabijačka) such as pork blood soup (prdelačka).

A popular way to consume meat is in the form of various types of sausages. Jitrnice is a sausage containing the minced meat and offal of pork cut. Meat from the neck, sides, lungs, spleen, and liver are cooked with white pastry, broth, salt, spices, garlic and sometimes onions. Klobása, also known as kielbasa, is a smoked sausage-like product made from minced meat. It is spicy and durable. Jelito is a pork sausage-like product containing pork blood and pearl barley or pastry pieces. Tlačenka is a meat or poultry product consisting of little pieces of meat in jelly/aspic from connective tissue boiled into mush, served with onion, vinegar and bread. Ovar is a simple dish made from rather fatty pork meat (head or knuckle). These pieces of lower quality meat are boiled in salted water.

Various poultry is also consumed, including goose, duck, turkey, chicken, pheasant, partridge, guinea fowl, and pigeon. Roast duck (pečená kachna) is served with bread or potato dumplings and braised red cabbage. Roast turkey can be larded with or wrapped with bacon and roasted, though this preparation is not very common.

Fish, mostly trout and carp, is commonly eaten at Christmas (Christmas carp). Crayfish used to be commonly consumed but are now protected due to declining populations.

Rabbit, mutton, lamb, and horse is commonly bred in the countryside for consumption. Wild game such as hare, boar, and deer are not as common.

Some other specialized meat dishes include:

- Guláš - a stew usually made from beef, pork or game with onions and spices. It is usually accompanied with knedlík or sometimes bread. Czech guláš is not to be confused with Hungarian "gulyás", which is a soup more similar to Czech gulášovka (a soup). Pörkölt is the Hungarian equivalent of Czech guláš.
- Roast pork with dumplings and cabbage (pečené vepřové s knedlíky a se zelím, colloquially vepřo-knedlo-zelo) is often considered the most typical Czech dish. The roast pork is served with various combinations of dumplings and pickled or cooked cabbages.
- Svíčková - Marinated beef tenderloin, usually larded, with a svíčková sauce—a thick sauce made by blending carrot, parsley root, celeriac and sometimes cream. This dish is often served with knedlíky (bread dumplings), Chantilly cream, cranberry compote (kompot) and a slice of lemon.
- Sekaná - A type of meatloaf made from minced pork or beef
- Řízek (schnitzel) - Slices of veal, pork, or chicken dry-battered in flour, eggs, and breadcrumbs (trojobal or "triplecoat"). Řízek is served with potato side-dishes. The Czech trojobal is used in some households at Christmas to cover carp or trout decorated with lemon slices.
- Karbanátek (frikadelle) - A fritter usually made from pork, beef, or minced fish. It is often battered like řízek. Vegetarian versions exist using pastry pieces instead of meat.
- Kuře na paprice - Chicken cooked in a sauce made of paprika, onion, and cream.
- Koprová omáčka or Koprovka - a dill cream sauce served with bread dumplings.

== Other dishes ==
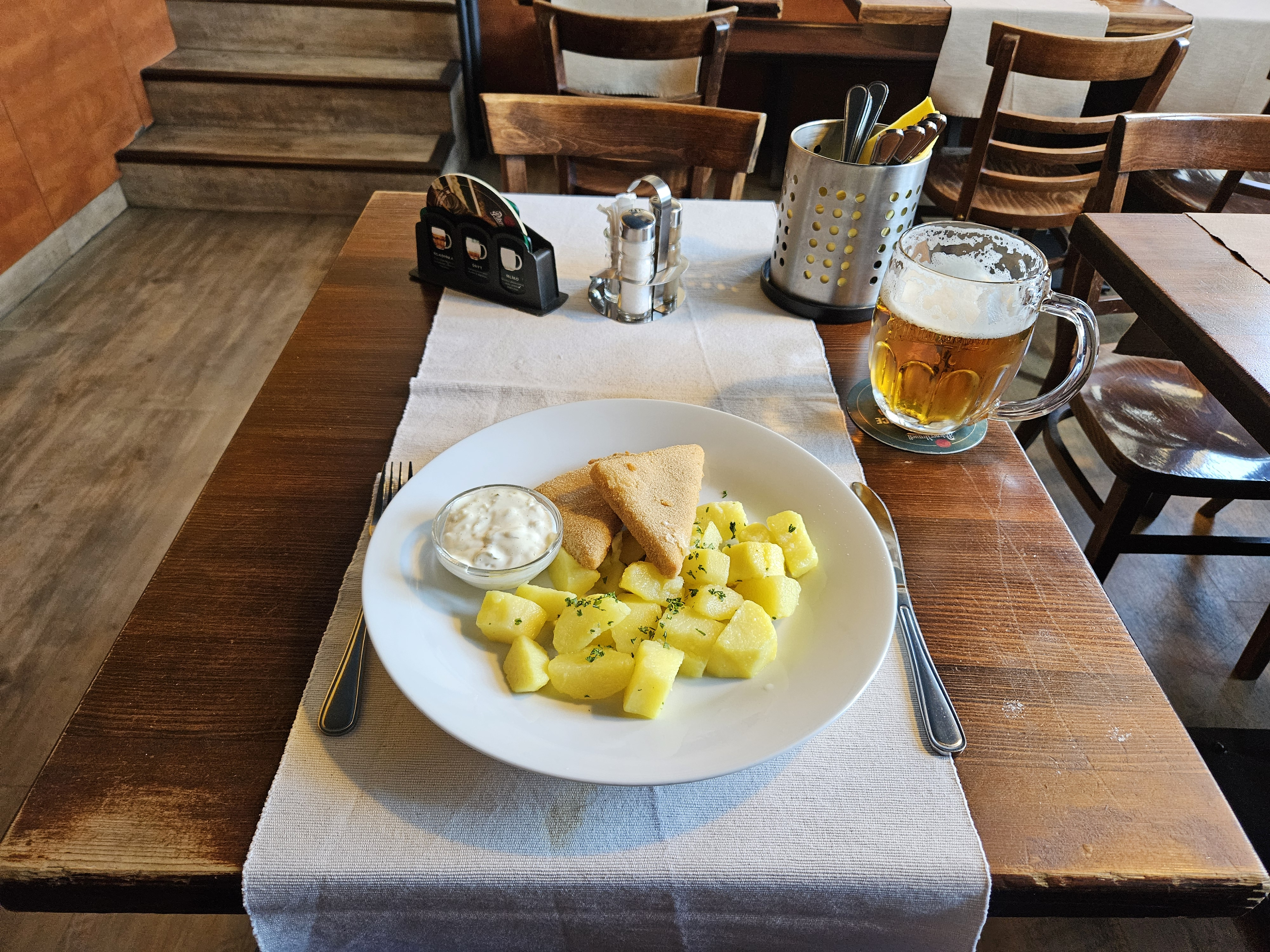
Fried Edam cheese (Smažený sýr) with potatoes and tartar sauce

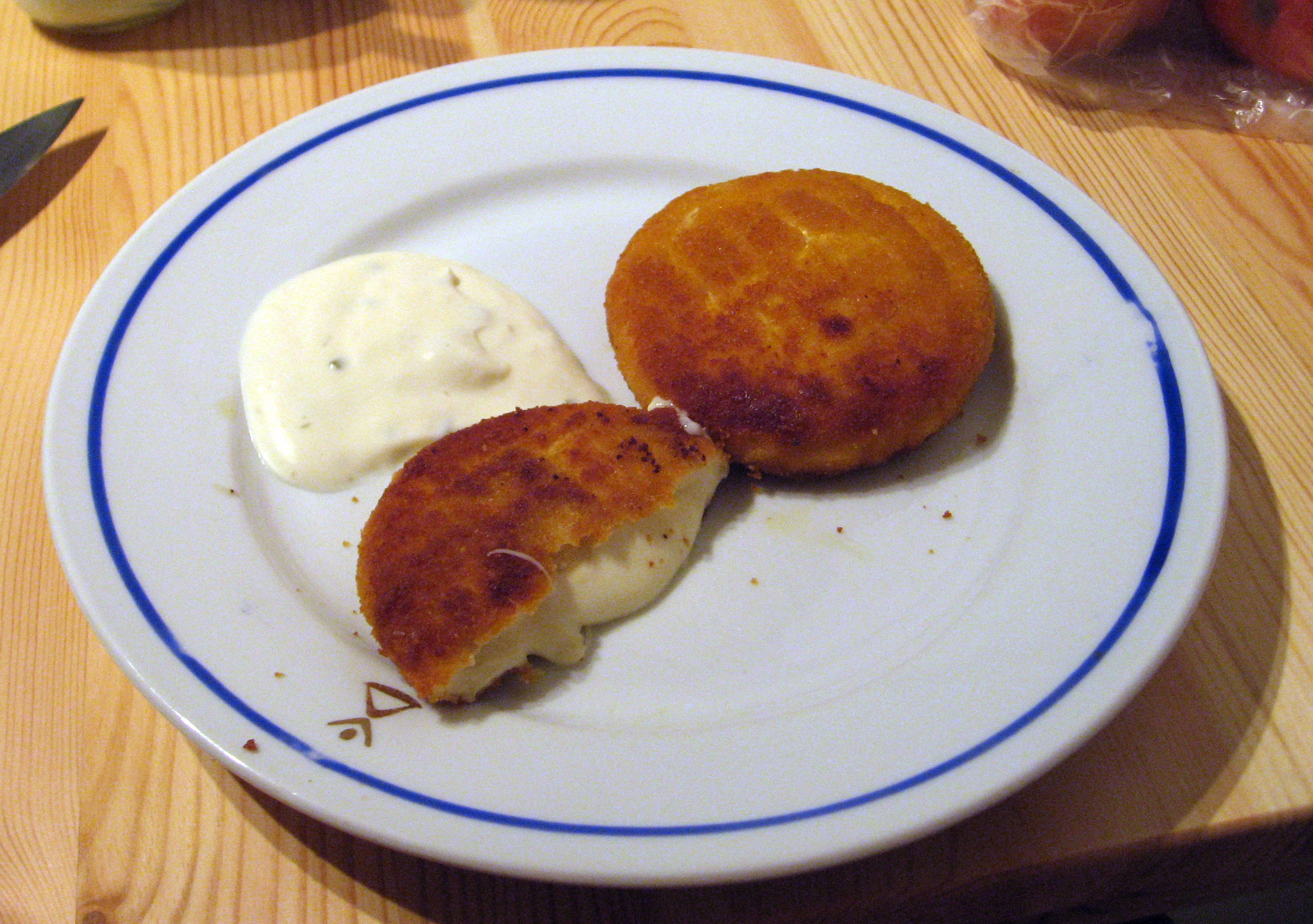
Fried hermelín (Smažený hermelín) with tartar sauce

- Houbový Kuba (Mushroom Jamie) - a baked dish prepared from cooked hulled grain (barley) mixed with cooked mushrooms, fried onion, garlic, fat, and black pepper. It is served for Christmas.
- Smažený sýr (Fried cheese, colloquially smažák) - a battered fried cheese usually of Edam type (also Hermelín), about 1 cm thick, coated in flour, egg and bread crumbs like Wiener schnitzel and fried. Served with tartar sauce and potatoes or French fries.
- Nudle s mákem - homemade noodles with ground poppy seed served with powdered sugar and melted butter.
- Bramborové šišky s mákem - potato buns with ground poppy seed served with powdered sugar and melted butter.
- Palačinky - Thin pancakes.
- Šoulet (shoulet) - a mix of boiled peas with barley, fat and other ingredients.
- Žemlovka - a baked dish made with layers of sliced rolls or buns called žemle, sliced apples and milk or eggs. It is served with cinnamon and raisins.
- Krupicová kaše (Semolina porridge) - a semolina porridge served with sugar, honey, cinnamon or cocoa with butter on the top. Optionally, sliced apples or apricots are added as toppings. Healthier versions substitute semolina with oatmeal or rice.
- Plněné papriky (Stuffed bell peppers) - bell peppers stuffed with meat or rice with vegetables.
- Lečo (lecsó) - a stew made from peppers, onions, tomatoes and spices.
- Deviled eggs

== Snacks ==
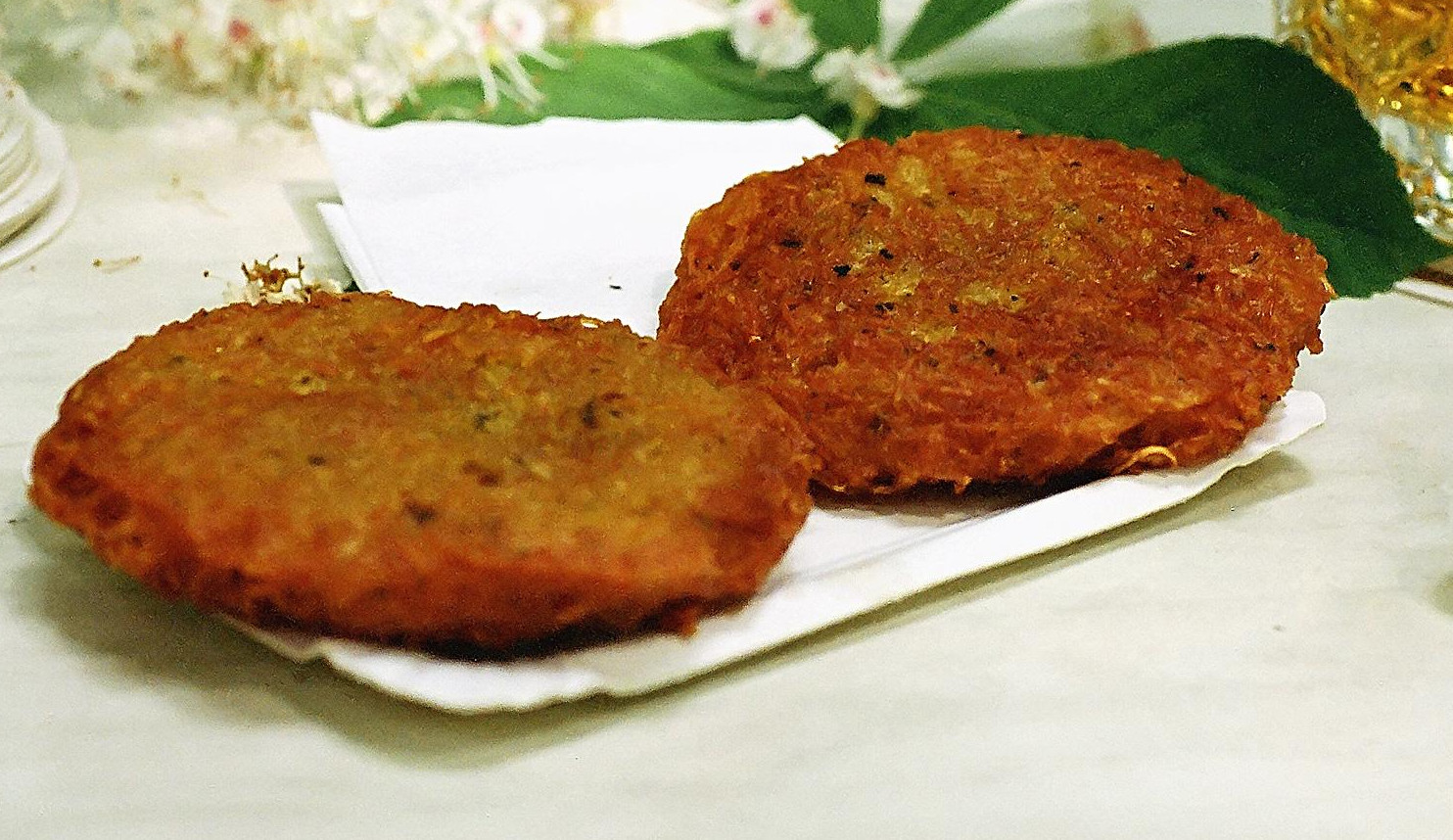
Fried bramboráky (potato pancakes)

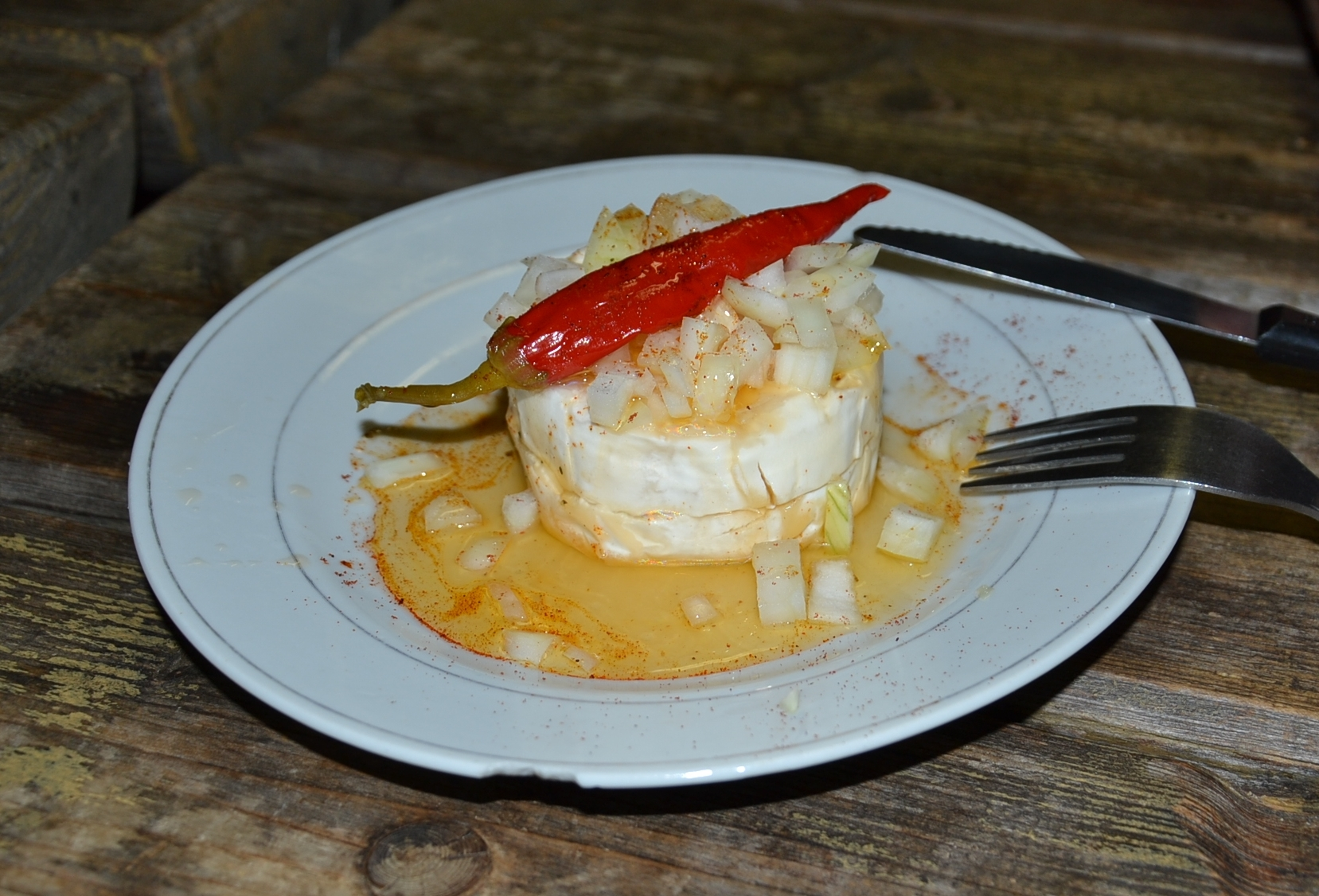
Nakládaný hermelín (marinated cheese)

=== Pub foods ===
Czech drinking culture has created a suite of snacks often served in pub settings:

- Utopenci (literally "drowned men") - spicy pickled bratwursts (špekáčky) in sweet-sour vinegar marinaded with black pepper, bay leaf, onion and chili peppers. They are often available in Czech pubs.
- Nakládaný hermelín - a soft cheese similar to Brie and Camembert. It is marinated with peppers and onions in oil.
- Pivní sýr (Beer cheese) - a soft cheese, usually mixed with raw onions and mustard, which is spread onto toasted bread.

=== Other snacks ===
- Bramboráky - fried pancakes similar to rösti made of grated raw potato, flour, carrots or sour cabbage, and rarely sausage. They are spiced with marjoram, salt, pepper, and garlic, and usually sized to fit the cooking dish. They are regionally called cmunda or vošouch in Plzeň and strik or striky in Czech Silesia.
- Obložené chlebíčky (garnished breads) - open-faced sandwiches. They are made with bread called veka. They may be served with mayonnaise, ham, egg, fish, salads or spreads on the top. They are usually decorated with fresh sliced or pickled cucumber, tomato, red or yellow bell pepper, sliced radish, or parsley. Jednohubky are similar to obložené chlebíčky, but much smaller.
- Párek v rohlíku - Czech version of the hot dog. The hot dog is boiled or steamed, dipped in mustard or ketchup, and served in a roll with a hole inside rather than in a sliced bun.
- Langoše - a type of fried bread influenced by Hungarian cuisine. They are usually served with garlic, Edam cheese and ketchup, or some combination of the three.
- Olomoucké tvarůžky or "syrečky" - an aged cheese with a strong odour. It is made in and sold from Loštice, a small town in Moravia. The tradition of making this cheese dates back to the 15th century. Tvarůžky can be fried, marinated, or added to bramboráky.

== Sweets ==
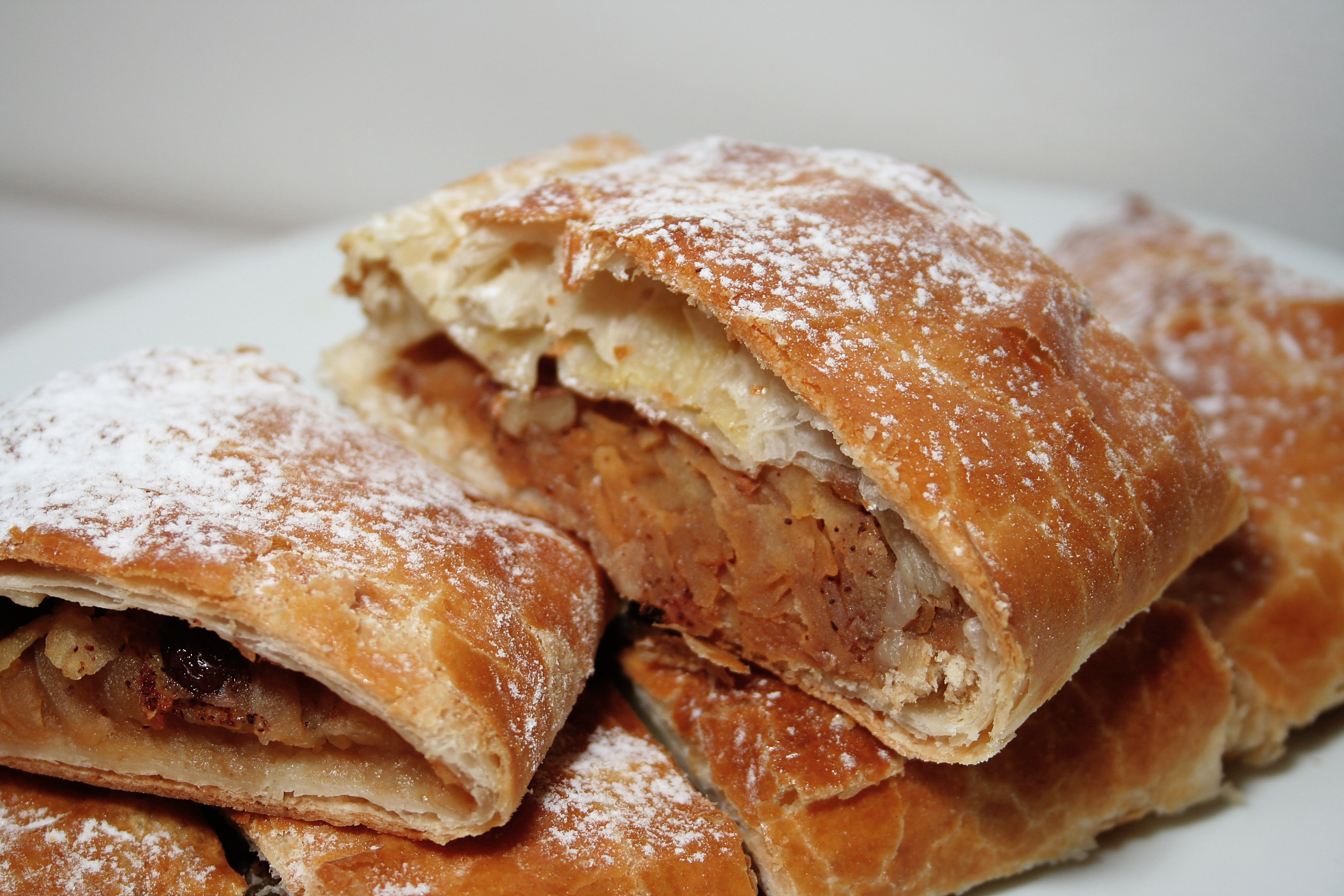
Apple strudel with raisins

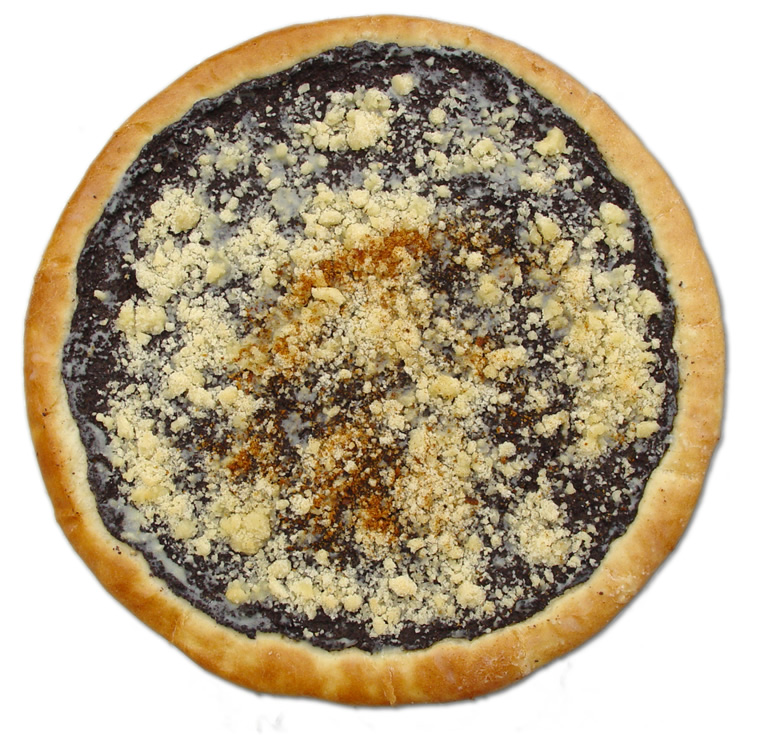
Frgál, a type of koláč baked in Moravian Wallachia

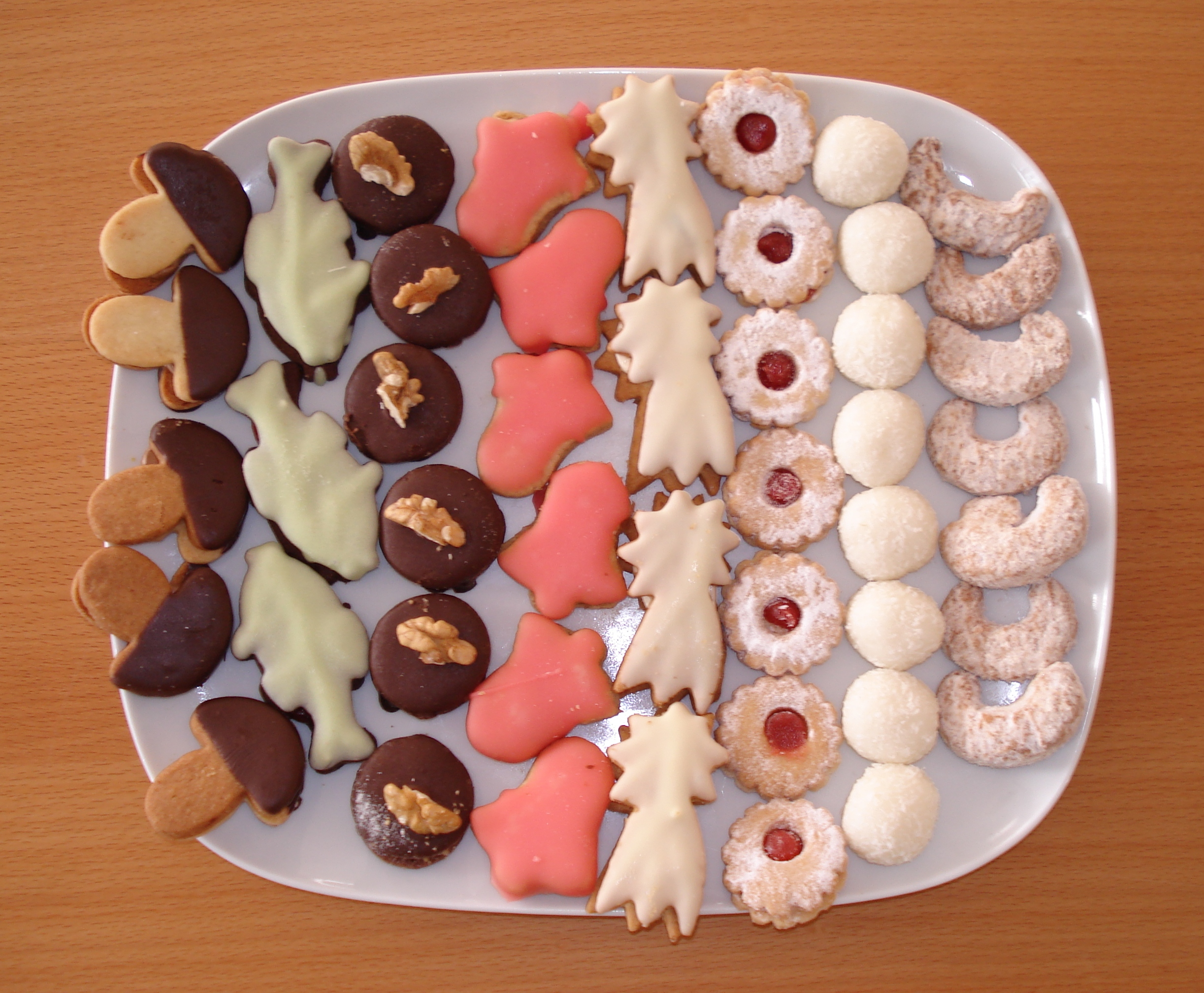
Christmas cookies (vánoční cukroví)

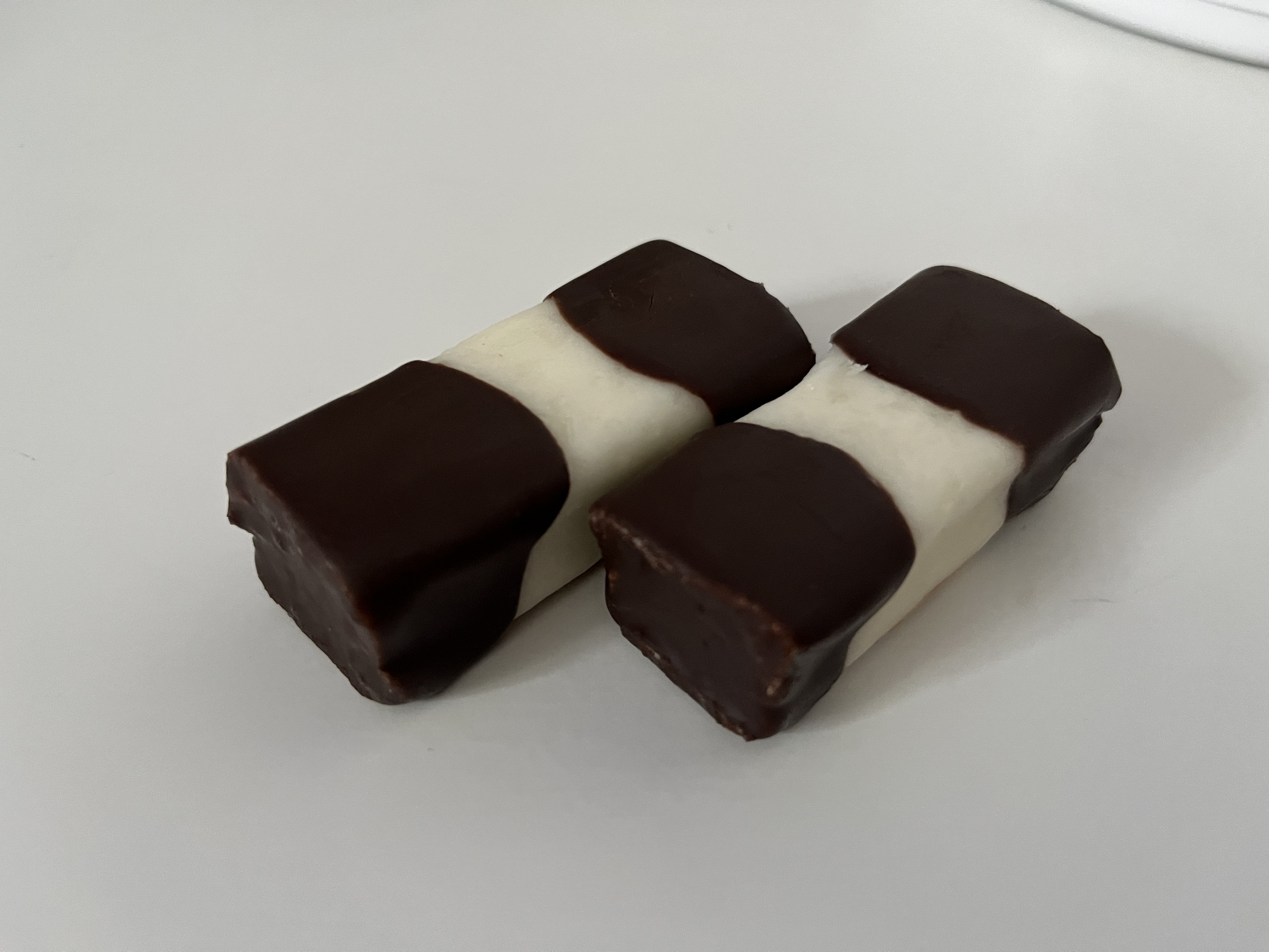
Metro dessert

In most cases, sweet food is not consumed as dessert, but rather as a separate occasion such as for afternoon coffee. Sweets filled with fruit, poppy seed and quark are prevalent and come in diverse forms including cakes, koláče (pies), tarts, fritters, and dumplings (ovocné knedlíky). The tradition of making pies has been preserved in American Czech communities who have settled in the Midwestern United States and Texas. They are laborious to make and usually prepared for special celebrations, births, funerals and they also have a role in Czech wedding traditions where they are distributed to friends and family in place of wedding invitations. The most common fillings are poppy seed, apricots (meruňkové knedlíky) and prunes.

Dough prepared for dumplings may include potatoes, and while the combination of fruits, jams and cheeses varies among households, plums (švestkové knedlíky), apricots or strawberries (jahodové knedlíky) are common. The finished dumplings are boiled and often garnished with butter, poppy seeds or grated cheese, and a sweetener (traditionally dried and powdered pears, but sugar is used in modern adaptations). Also filled with fruit or jam (and sometimes garnished with poppy seeds) are the Czech crepes called palačinky. Traditional Czech sponge cake (bublanina), served most often for breakfast, is made with cream, eggs and sugar and seasonal fruits, especially whole cherries.

Some examples of sweets include:

- Strudel - a type of layered hand pie, often containing apple and topped with powdered sugar. It can be served warm or cold
- Koláče - a type of sweet pastry made of puffy yeast dough that holds a portion of fruit, poppy seed paste, or cottage cheese (tvaroh).
- Buchty - a yeast pastry similar to koláče. However, the filling is wrapped in pieces of dough and baked and is not visible in the final product.
- Buchtičky se šodó - sweet dumplings with custard sauce. The dumplings are made of yeast pastry and the custard is made of egg yolks and wine. However, nowadays the custard is often replaced with vanilla pudding. The recipe is claimed by multiple countries in Central Europe.
- Pudding - a layered custard featuring multiple flavours combined in layers. It is served in a glass topped with fruit or shaped in a mould.
- Vánoční cukroví - various cookies served for Christmas.
- Vánočka - braided buns similar to brioche or challah prepared for Christmas.
- Mazanec - buns similar to brioche prepared for Christmas.
- Velikonoční beránek (Easter Lamb) - a cake in the shape of a lamb prepared for Easter.
- Bábovka - a cake similar to velikonoční beránek but marbled with a cocoa dough. Often served with coffee.
- Lívance - small yeast pancakes eaten with jam or warm forest fruits.
- Vdolky and koblihy - types of filled donuts - see List of doughnut varieties.
- Perník - gingerbread-like pastries made with honey. The pastries are made into various shapes such as hearts, cottages, and "gingerbread" houses—especially in the Pardubice Region where the tradition was established in the 16th century.
- Trdelník - a spit cake. First adopted in Moravia from Transleithania, it recently gained popularity in Prague and the rest of the country.
- Roláda - a sponge cake roulade filled with jam.
- Litá bublanina - a pancake-like batter poured onto a baking sheet. Pieces of fruit such as apples, pears, or cherries are placed on the batter and sprinkled with powdered sugar.
- Makovec - a sponge cake made from ground poppy seed.
- Mrkvanec - a sponge cake made with grated carrots.
- Mrkvánky - small turnovers filled with plum or pear jam and with grated carrot added to the dough.
- Míša - a treat made out of frozen curd; it is popular with children and has been produced since 1961.
- Metro (dessert) is a sponge cake dessert with fat filling, it has been produced since 1974, to celebrate opening of the Prague Metro.
- Žloutkové řezy - a walnut cake with egg yolk glaze served at Christmas and Easter parties.

== Beverages ==
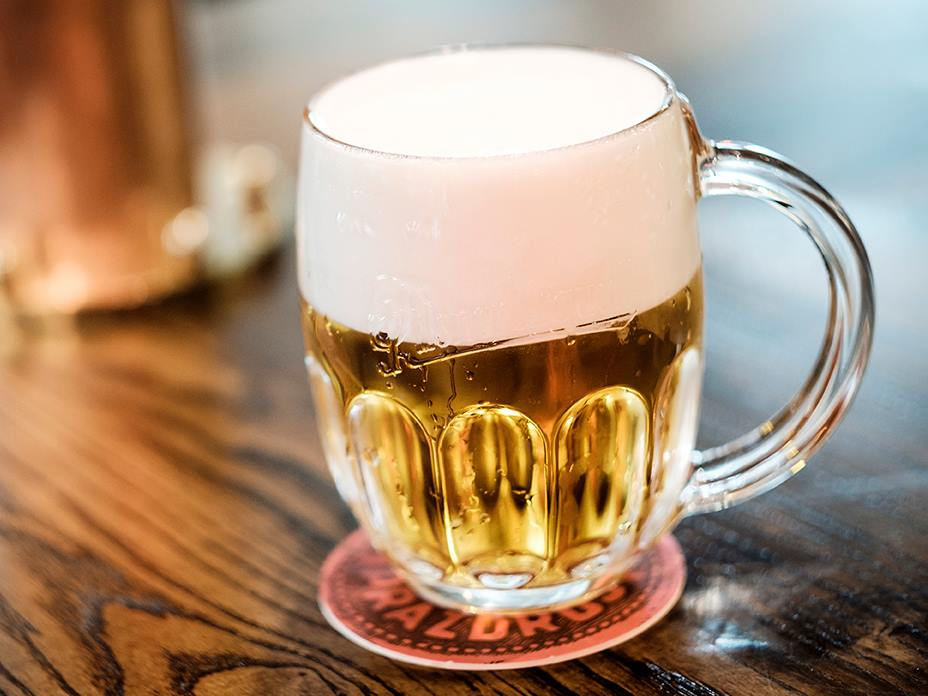
Pilsner Urquell in a branded mug

=== Alcoholic beverages ===
The Czech Republic has the highest per-capita consumption of beer in the world. The most common style, which originated in the country, is the Pilsner. Aside from beer, Czechia also produces wine, mostly in Moravia.

Czech Slivovitz and other pálenka (fruit brandies) are also produced in the country. Tuzemák, traditionally marketed as "Czech rum", is made from potatoes or sugar beets.

Various herbal liquors are also produced in Czechia. Becherovka, a herbal bitters was invented in Karlovy Vary, Czechia, and can be consumed as a mixed drink with tonic water, known under the portmanteau of Beton ("concrete"). Another popular mixed drink is Fernet Stock mixed with tonic, called Bavorák or Bavorské pivo ("Bavarian beer").

=== Non-alcoholic beverages ===
Kofola is a non-alcoholic Czech soft drink somewhat similar in look and taste to Coca-Cola, but not as sweet. It was invented during the communist era as a substitute to cola drinks which could not be imported during the era.

Malinovka is a bright reddish pink raspberry soft drink that is also popular in the country.

== See also ==
- Beer in the Czech Republic
- Moravian cuisine
- Slovak cuisine
- Polish cuisine
- Austrian cuisine
- German cuisine
- Zelný trh
