= Bistro Praha =

Czech restaurant in Canada

Coordinates: 53°32′29″N 113°29′37″W

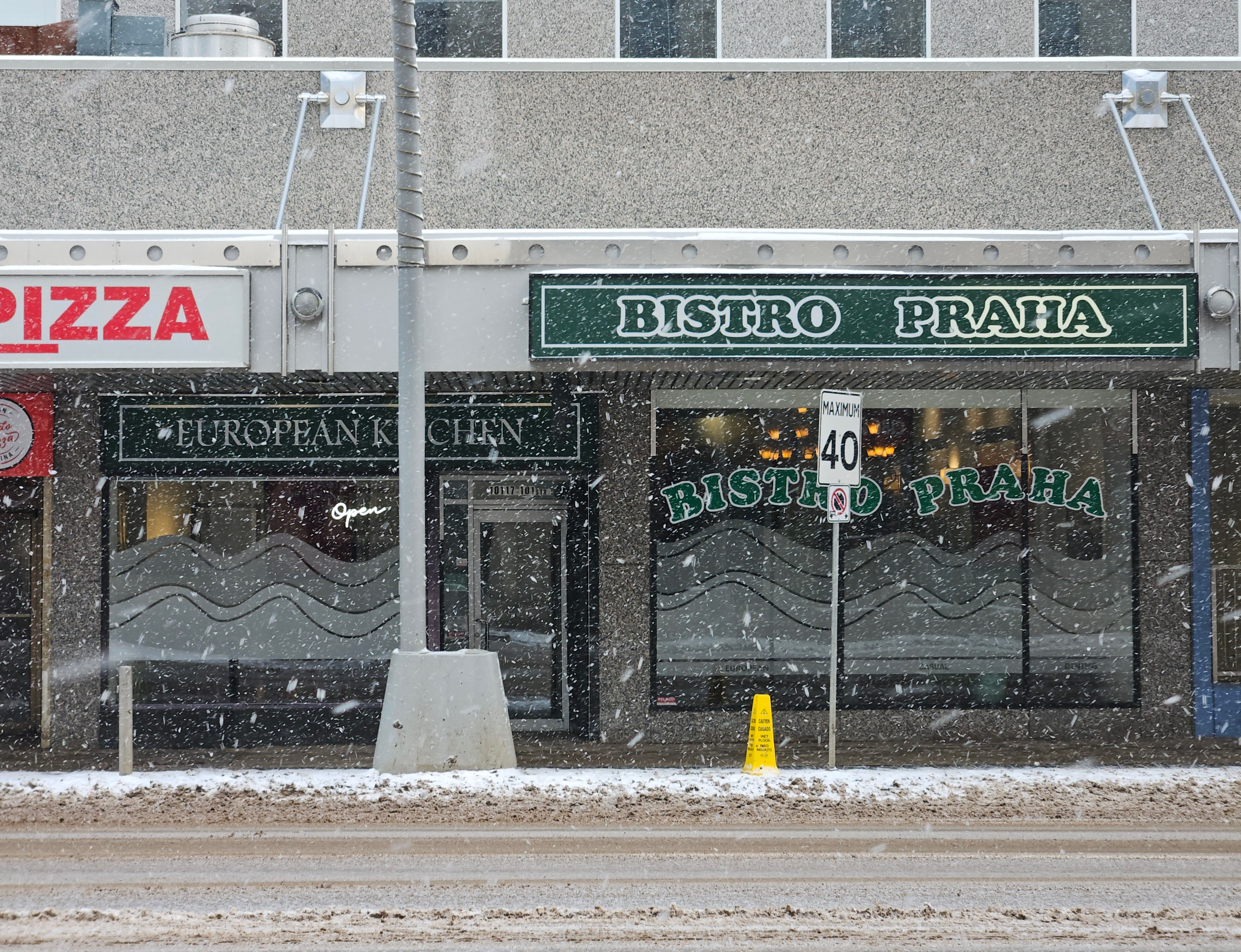
The storefront of Edmonton, Alberta restaurant Bistro Praha

Bistro Praha is a Czech restaurant in downtown Edmonton, Alberta. It has gained particular local renown for its renditions of traditional Czech and broadly European dishes, including steak tartare, schnitzel, and smažený sýr (fried breaded cheese).

== History ==
Bistro Praha was founded in 1977 by Czech immigrant Frantisek Cikanek and was originally located in the historic Kelly Ramsey Building on Rice Howard Way in downtown Edmonton. After the building burned down in 2009, the restaurant was bought by longtime employees Sharka Svajgr, her husband Daniel Schultz, her brother Milan Svajgr, and his girlfriend Alena Bacovsky. It relocated a short distance to the Empire Building and reopened in 2011. Sharka Svajgr died from cancer in 2019. As of 2022, Milan Svajgr and Alena Bacovsky retained ownership of the restaurant.

Throughout its history, the restaurant has been a hangout for artists and performers, in part due to its late hours. Many of its notable patrons, including Kirk Douglas, Joni Mitchell, and Tommy Banks, have signed the bottoms of the restaurant stools. These stools were salvaged after the fire, and a mural of the Swiss Alps that prominently featured in the original restaurant was replaced by an identical one. Other regulars at the restaurant have included many NHL players from Central and Eastern European countries, including Edmonton Oilers players Leon Draisaitl and Petr Klima, as well as composer Malcolm Forsyth and artists of the Edmonton Symphony Orchestra and the Citadel Theatre.
