= Compagnie des Fromages et RichesMonts =

Compagnie des Fromages et RichesMonts (CF&R) is a French food-processing company, specialized in the manufacturing and the marketing of French cheese, more specifically traditional French soft cheese (such as camembert and brie) and raclette cheese.

CF&R is currently present, with its leading brands (Le Rustique, Coeur de Lion, RichesMonts, St André and Révérend) and private labels, in over 70 countries in the world.

CF&R was founded in 2008 with the merging of La Compagnie des Fromages (Bongrain) and Les Fromageries RichesMonts (Sodiaal). Today, CF&R is a joint-venture partially owned by Bongrain S.A. (world leader for cheese and milk specialties) and partially by Sodiaal (fourth dairy cooperative in Europe).

CF&R's French headquarters are located in Puteaux, near Paris. CF&R also has nine production sites in France (in Normandy, Lorraine and Auvergne).
