= Smažený sýr =

Czech and Slovak cheese dish

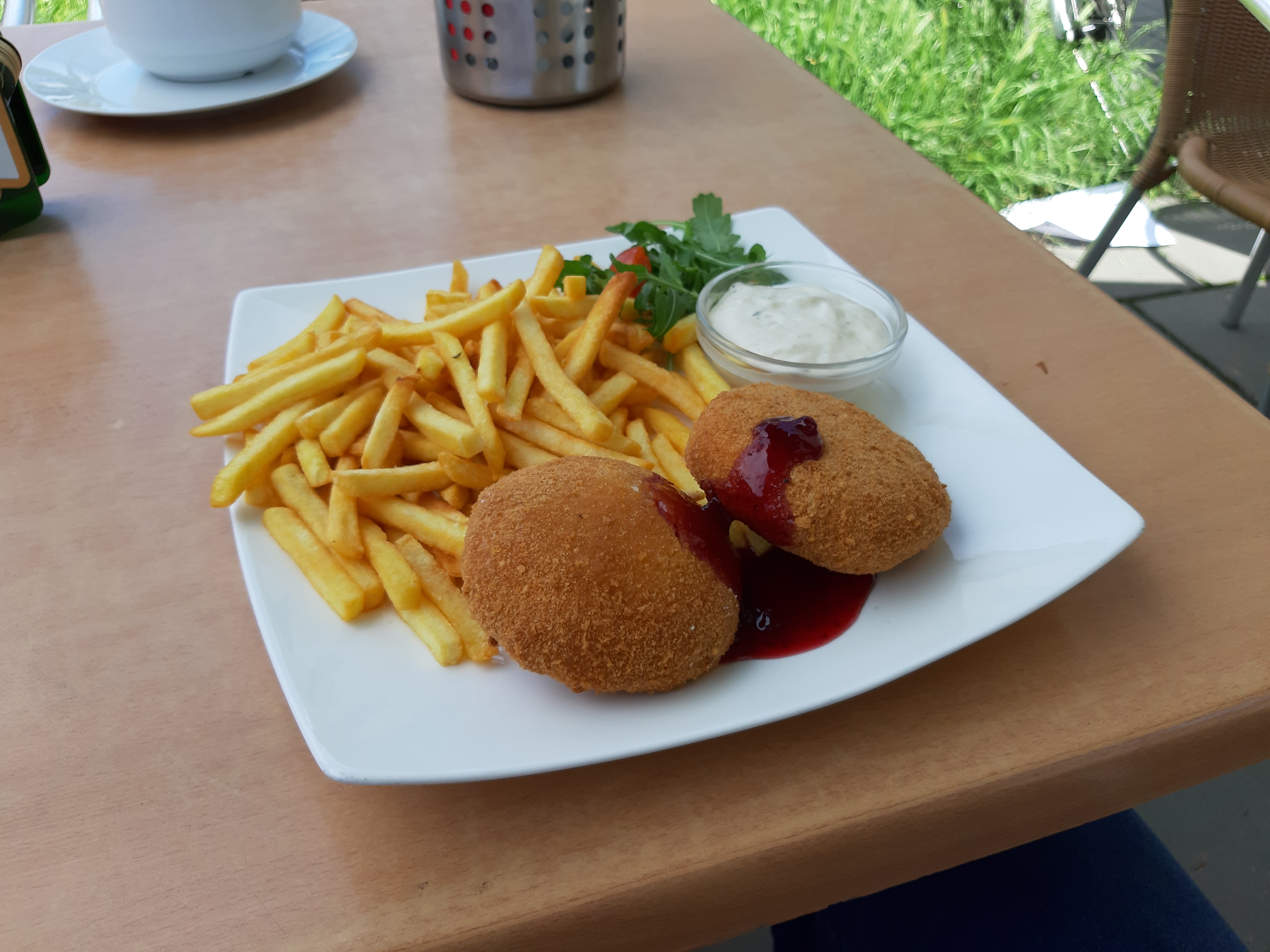
- Smažený sýr as served in an Olomouc restaurant
- Alternative names: vyprážaný syr, smažák
- Place of origin: Czechia, Slovakia
- Main ingredients: Cheese, flour, eggs, bread crumbs

Smažený sýr (Czech pronunciation: [ˈsmaʒɛniː ˈsiːr]) or vyprážaný syr (Slovak pronunciation: [ˈʋipraːʐaniː ˈsir]) – both meaning "fried cheese" – is a Czech and Slovak cheese-based dish that is widely consumed in both countries of the former state of Czechoslovakia. It is a common street food in both countries and is popular among students as an inexpensive staple in school canteens.

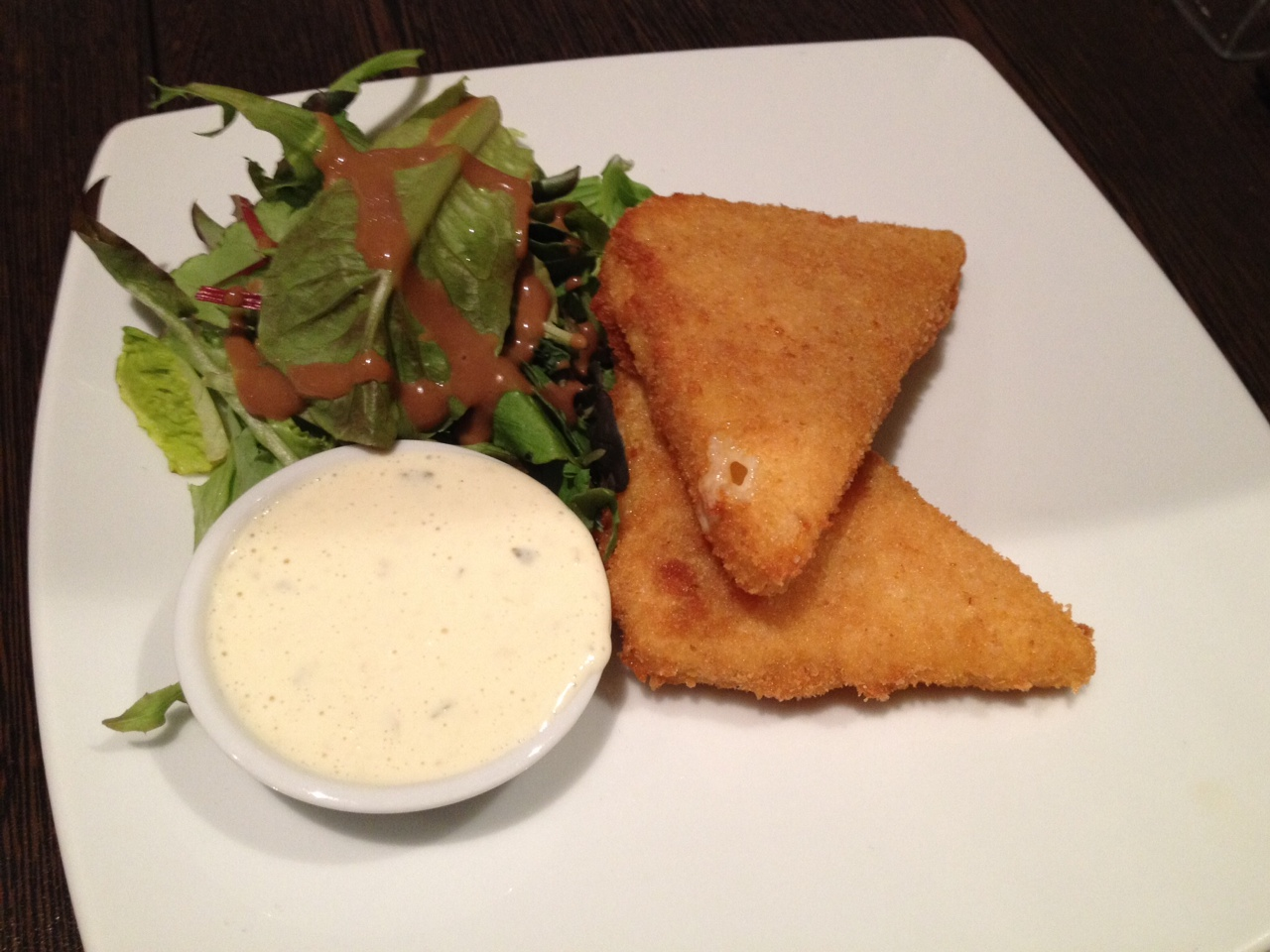
Fried Gruyère or Swiss cheese, served with tartar sauce and side salad

A slice of cheese about 1.5 cm (0.6 in) thick is first breaded with flour, egg, and bread crumbs and then fried either in a pan or deep-fat fryer. It is typically served with tartar sauce or mayonnaise, and is often accompanied by bread and potatoes (fries or boiled potatoes). The cheese most commonly used is Edam; Gouda, Gruyère and Emmental might be used as well (especially in better restaurants). When Hermelín (or Camembert), Niva or Olomoucké tvarůžky is used, the dish is no longer called smažený sýr but rather smažený hermelín, smažená Niva, or smažené tvarůžky, as applicable.

It is similar to the Italian mozzarella in carrozza. The dish may also be prepared with a thin slice of ham inserted between two slices of cheese; in Czech fast food outlets, it is often served in the form of a sandwich in something similar to a hamburger bun.

== See also ==
- Fried cheese
- List of street foods
