= Le Rustique =

Brand of French cheese

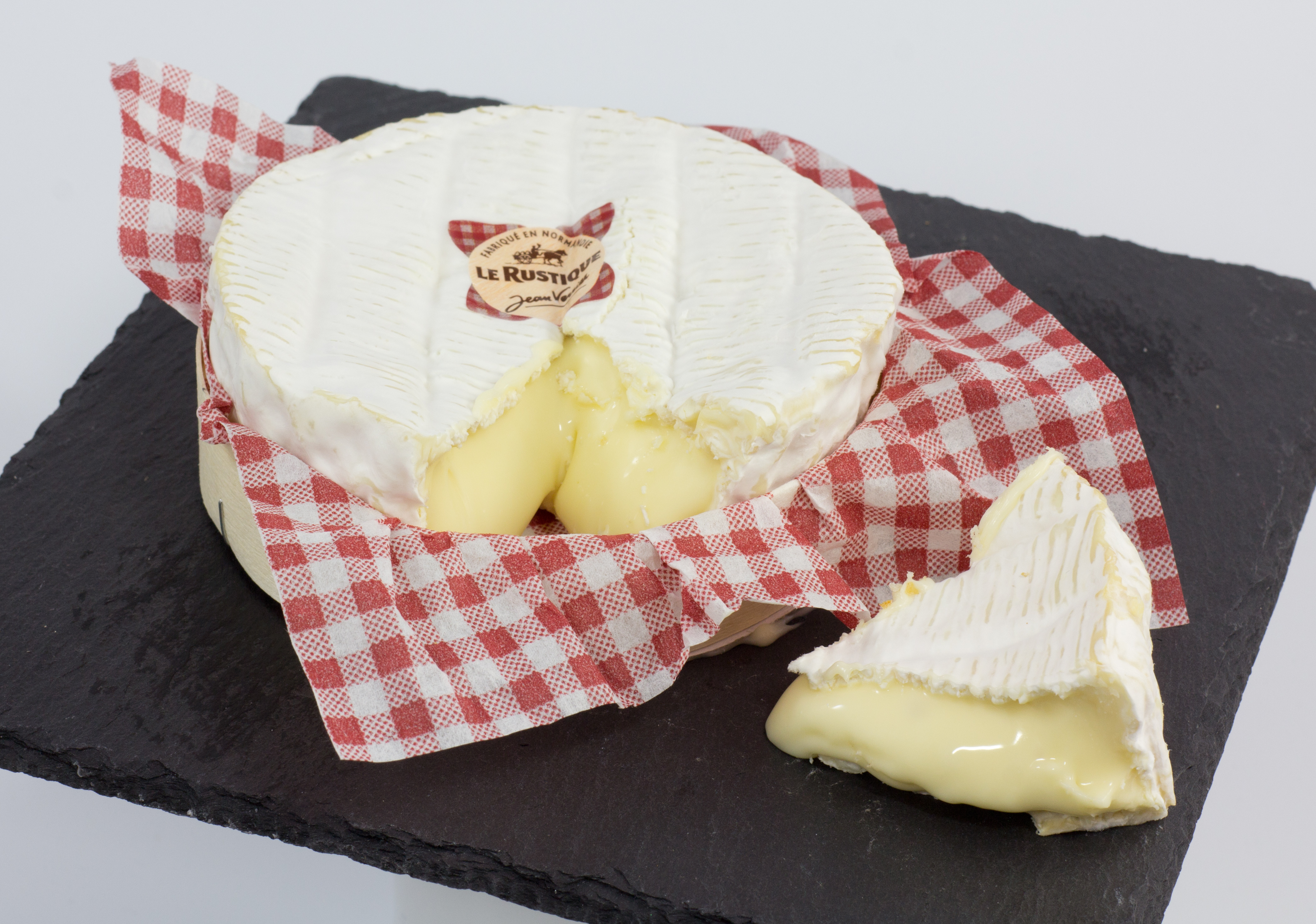
- Industry: Food processing
- Headquarters: Puteaux (Hauts-de-Seine), France
- Area served: Worldwide
- Products: Cheese
- Owner: Compagnie des Fromages et RichesMonts
- Website: www.lerustique.uk

Le Rustique is a brand of French cheese owned by the Compagnie des Fromages et RichesMonts (CF&R). Le Rustique was created in 1975 in Normandy, France with a recipe of camembert. The brand then launched other soft cheeses including brie, camembert light and coulommiers. Le Rustique is sold in France and over 60 other countries, it is best known for its camembert and brie but also commercializes hard cheese slices and raclette cheese.

== History ==
- 1975: Creation of the Le Rustique brand
- 1977: Le Rustique is #1 of up-market camemberts
- 1980: First TV commercial for Le Rustique in France. Le Grand Rustique 1 kg is awarded the gold medal at the Concours Général Agricole (CGA) – a competitive agricultural show in France
- 1985: Le grand Rustique is awarded the gold medal at the CGA by the international jury and the silver medal by the French jury
- 1987: Launch of the coulommiers Le Rustique.
- 1988: Launch of the camembert Le Rustique light
- 1991: The camembert Le Rustique is awarded the gold medal at the CGA
- 1994: Camembert and coulommiers are both awarded the gold medal at the CGA.
- 1996: Change of identity for Le Rustique: the horse-drawn carriage changes direction and the vichy slightly changes color.
- 2004: Launch of the double cream camembert (60% fat) and the « petit brie » 500g
- 2008: Launch of the « petit camembert » 150g et billboarding about « The spring »
- 2009: New brand signature "Le Rustique, le goût de l'authentique"
- 2010: Launch of the "pointe de brie" Le Rustique and Munster Le Rustique. Launch of Le Rustique slices in Germany.
- 2012: Launch of the first raclette cheeses Le Rustique in Germany.
- 2013: Launch of the camembert 8 portions Le Rustique

== Le Rustique range of cheese ==
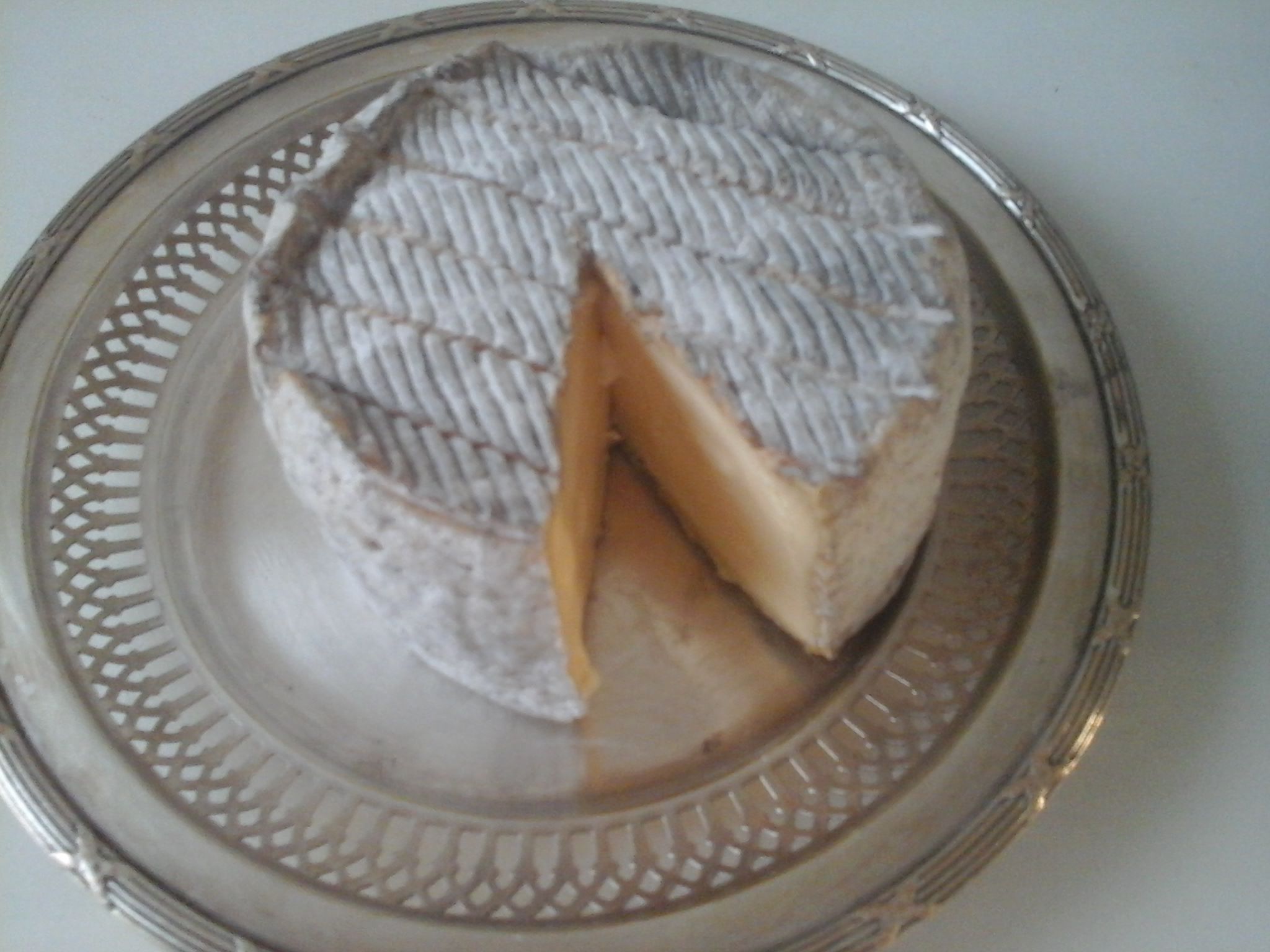
Tomme fruitée.

- Camembert Le Rustique 250g
- Coulommiers Le Rustique 350g
- Camembert Le Rustique au lait 1/2 écrémé 250g
- Petit camembert Le Rustique 150g
- Camembert 8 portions Le Rustique 240g
- Pointe de brie Le Rustique 200g
- Le Grand Rustique 1 kg
- Le Grand Rustique 1 kg Light
- Brie Le Rustique 2.5 kg
- Le petit munster Le Rustique 200g
- Le Rustique Crémerin de Moselle 200g
- Le Rustique Tomme Fruitée 280g
