= S-Methyl thioacetate =

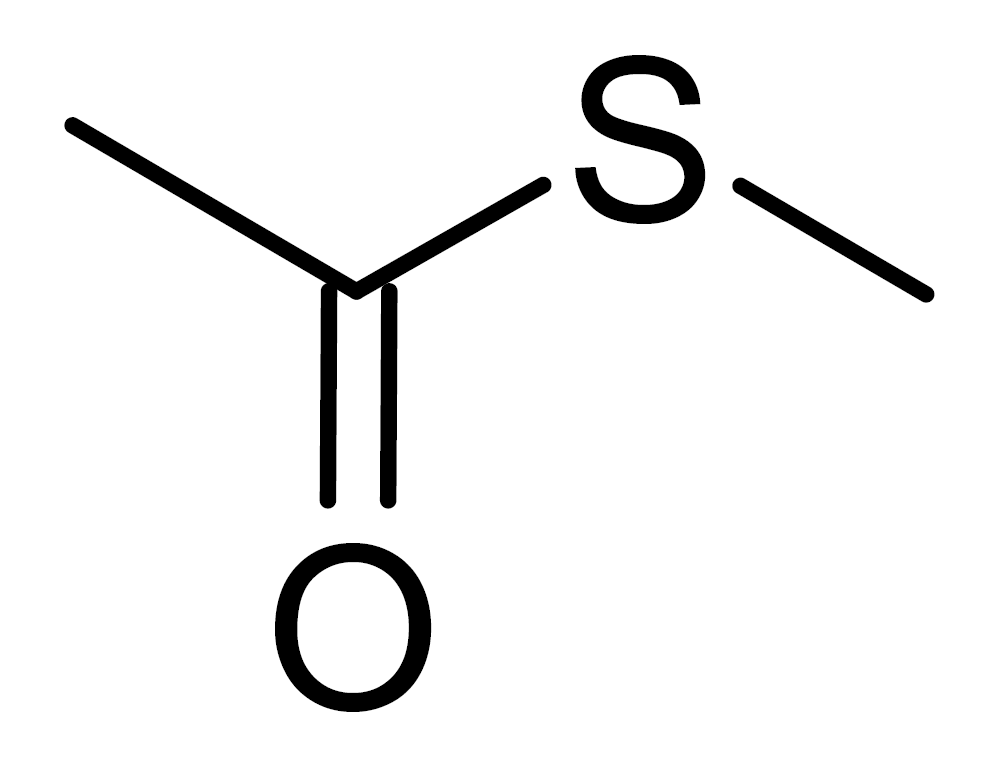

Identifiers
CAS Number	1534-08-3
3D model (JSmol)	Interactive image
ChEBI	CHEBI:51280
ChemSpider	66391
ECHA InfoCard	100.014.775
PubChem CID	73750
UNII	PF2D4MWX79
CompTox Dashboard (EPA)	DTXSID3073264
- InChI: InChI=1S/C3H6OS/c1-3(4)5-2/h1-2H3 Key: OATSQCXMYKYFQO-UHFFFAOYSA-N
- SMILES: CC(=O)SC

Properties
Chemical formula	C_{3}H_{6}OS
Molar mass	90.14 g·mol^{−1}
Density	1.013 g/cm^{3}
Boiling point	96–97 °C (205–207 °F; 369–370 K)
- Except where otherwise noted, data are given for materials in their standard state (at 25 °C [77 °F], 100 kPa). Infobox references

S-Methyl thioacetate is the organosulfur compound with the formula CH_{3}C(O)SCH_{3}. This colorless, malodorous liquid is found in many plant species. In its pure form it has an unpleasant sulfurous smell, but when highly diluted and along with other simple alkyl thioacetates and related compounds, it is an important component of the odor and flavour profile of some foods, including Camembert cheese, yogurt, and baijiu.

== Alternate isomer ==
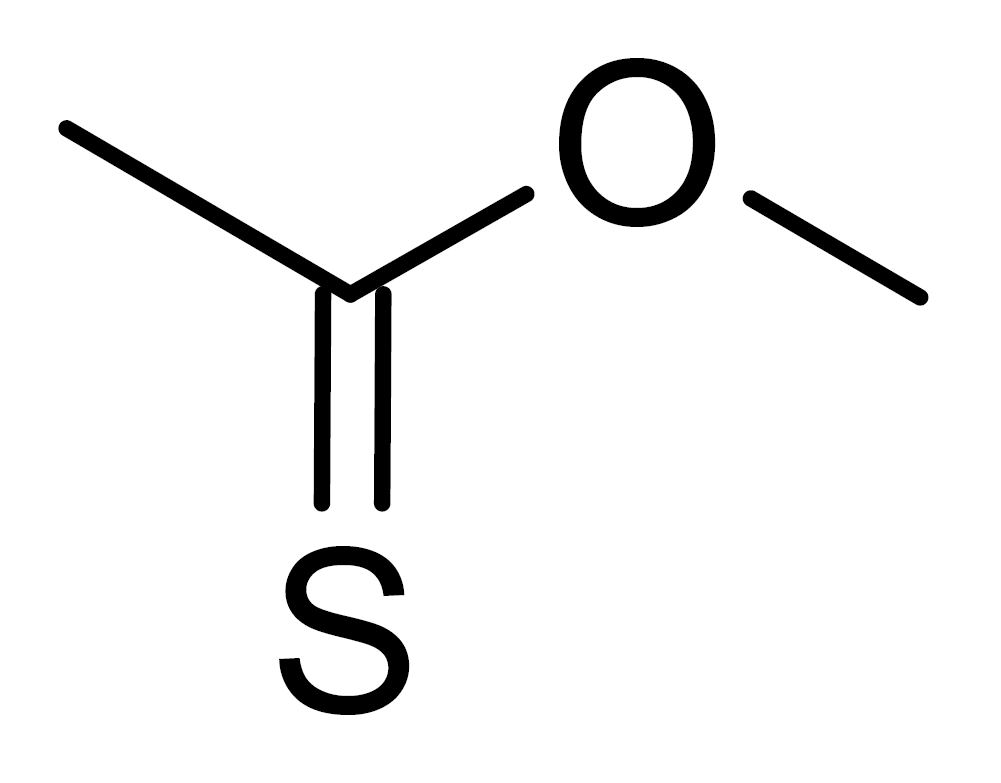
O-methyl ethanethioate, CAS# 21119-13-1

The constitutional isomer in which the oxygen and sulfur atoms are interchanged, O-methyl thioacetate, is also known as methyl thioacetate. It is not found in nature. It has mainly been the subject of theoretical studies.

== See also ==
- Thioacetic acid
