= Enbridge Centre =

Office tower in Edmonton, Alberta, Canada

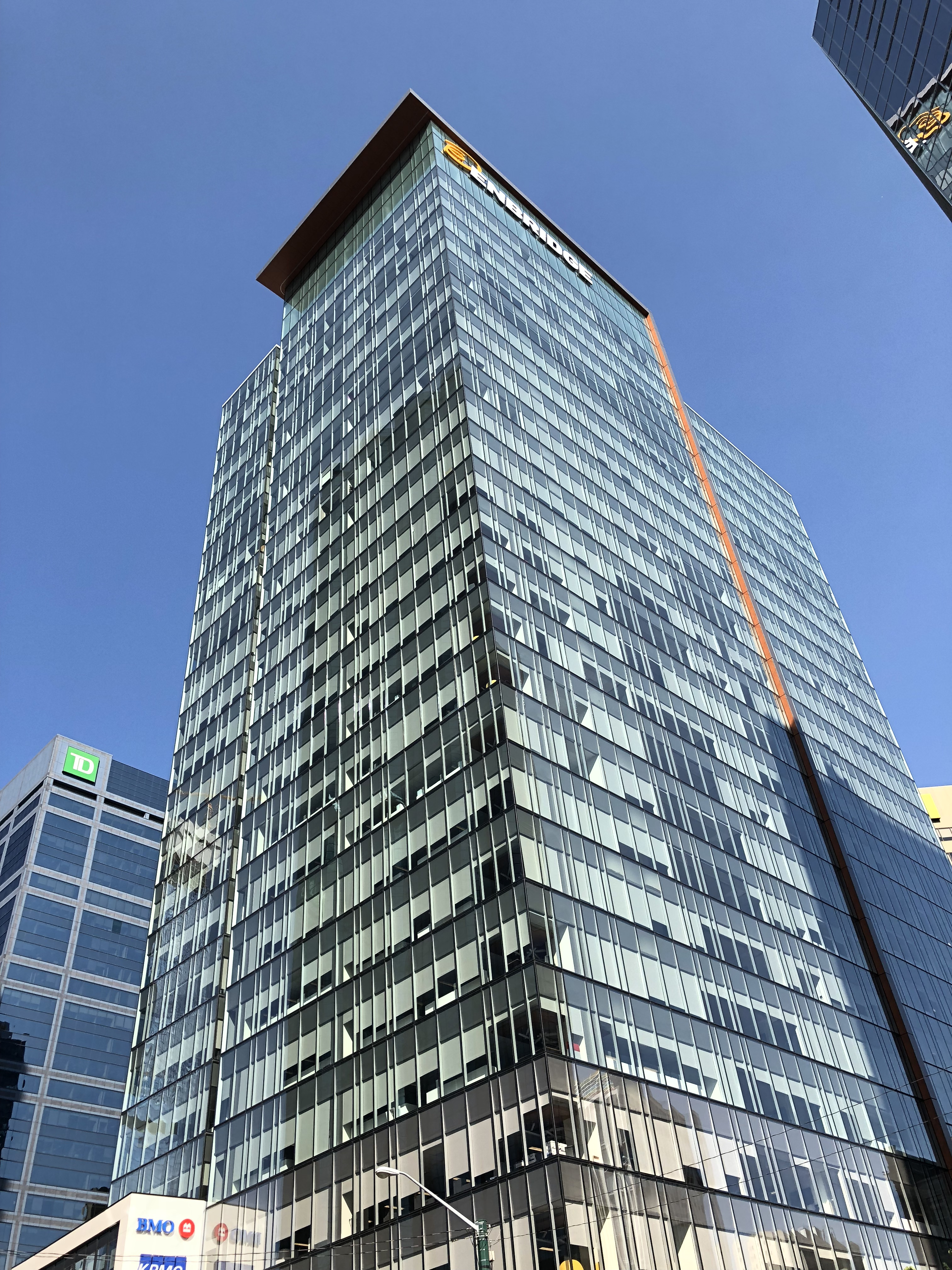
- Enbridge Centre in 2018

- Location within Edmonton
- Alternative names: Kelley Ramsey Tower

General information
- Status: Completed
- Type: Office
- Location: 10175 - 101 Street NW, Edmonton, Alberta, Canada
- Coordinates: 53.5424°N 113.4933°W
- Construction started: 2013
- Completed: 2016
- Owner: John Day Developments; Pangman Development Corporation

Height
- Height: 110.6 m (363 ft)

Technical details
- Floor count: 26
- Floor area: 51,190 m^{2} (551,000 sq ft)
- Lifts/elevators: 15

Design and construction
- Architecture firm: DIALOG
- Structural engineer: DIALOG
- Main contractor: Ledcor Construction Limited

Other information
- Parking: 372 stalls

Website
- www.enbridgecentre.ca

Enbridge Centre is a 28-storey office tower in Edmonton, Alberta. The facade of the building uses the bricks from the historic Kelly Ramsey Building, which previously occupied the site. It is located on 101 St. NW, and is connected to the Pedway network.
