= Svíčková =

Meat and vegetable stew

Svíčková na smetaně
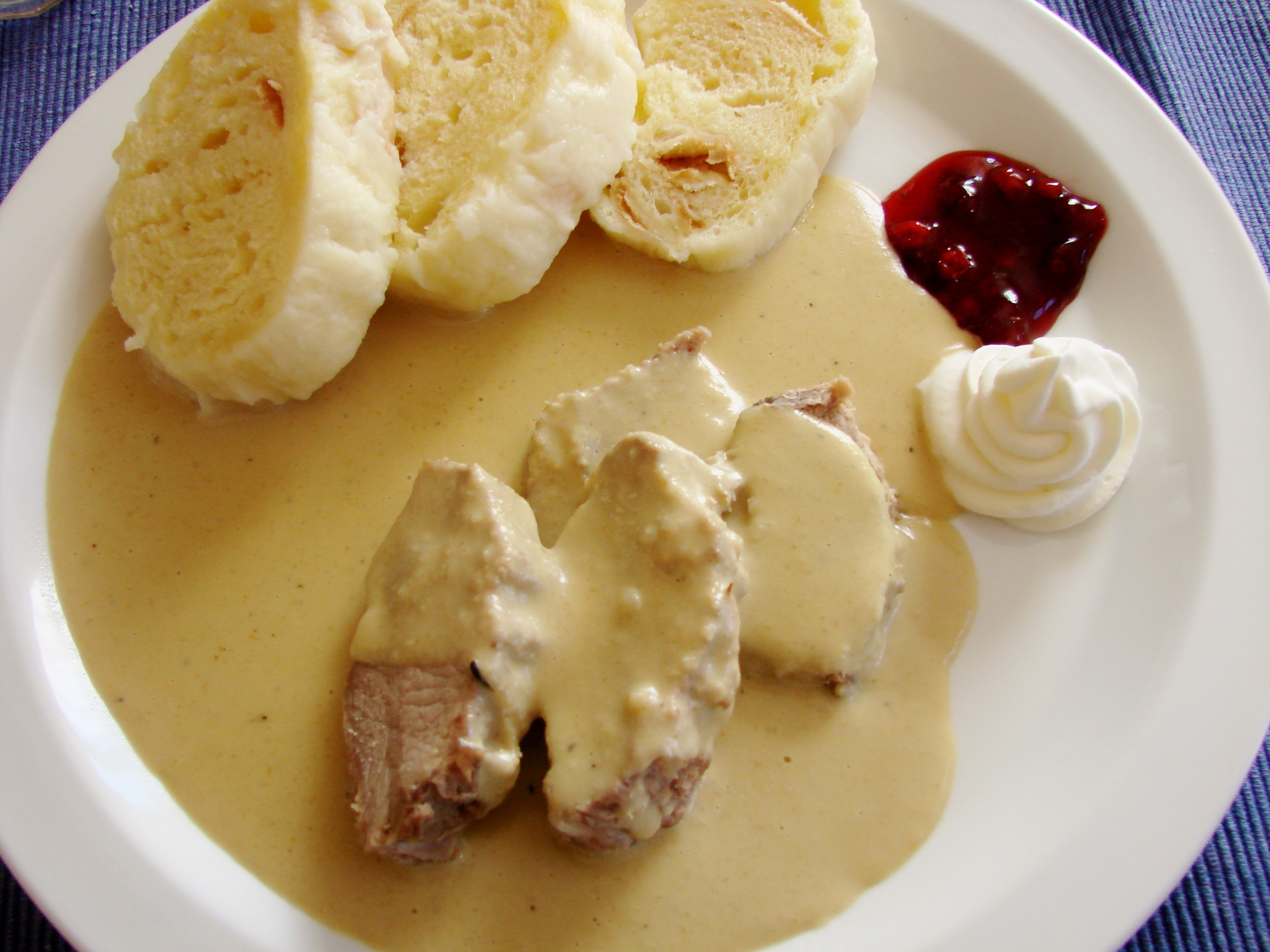
- Svíčková na smetaně served with dumplings, whipped cream, and cranberries
- Alternative names: Svíčková
- Type: Stew
- Course: Main
- Place of origin: Czech Republic
- Region or state: Central Europe
- Serving temperature: Hot
- Main ingredients: Meat (beef), vegetables (especially root vegetables), dumplings

Svíčková, or svíčková na smetaně (pronounced [ˈsviːt͡ʃkɔvaː na smɛ.ta.ɲɛ]), is a Czech meat dish and one of the most common Czech and Slovak meals. Svíčková is the Czech word for tenderloin, but this dish is traditionally beef topside (falešná svíčková, 'false tenderloin') prepared with vegetables (carrots, parsley root, celeriac and onion), spiced with black pepper, allspice, bay leaf and thyme, and boiled with double cream, though in practice other cuts of beef may sometimes be used. Topside is a cut from the front shoulder equivalent to jumeau à bifteck in French cuisine or girello di spalla in Italian cuisine. It is generally served with houskové knedlíky (bread dumplings).

== Preparation ==
Svíčková, or svíčková na smetaně (beef tenderloin), is a typical Czech dish and one of the most popular Czech meals. It is topside boiled or roasted with vegetables (carrots, parsley root, celeriac, and red onion, silver onion or pink onion), spiced with black pepper, juniper, allspice, bay leaf, and baked together, then vegetables and gravy are gathered, mashed/mixed with sour double cream and boiled for sauce. It is generally served with bread dumplings (houskové knedlíky), whipped cream and lingonberry sauce. In most restaurants and canteens the staff actually boil the beef and vegetables together in one pot, instead of roasting it.

== Varieties ==
Svíčková na smetaně is served with a cream (smetana) topping and usually with cranberry sauce and slice of lemon in many restaurants around the Czech Republic.

Bohemian immigrants to the United States following the First World War have passed on an older variation of the dish to subsequent generations, while regional tastes and product availability have influenced its preparation. Svíčková made in the Chicago area, for example, rarely includes vegetables in its final presentation, but instead incorporates them into a vinegar-based marinade suffused with crushed allspice and bay leaves.

Vegetarian restaurants in the Czech Republic also prepare the dish without the use of meat. Instead, they use a vegetarian sirloin usually made from soy, and the broth does not contain meat.

== Etymology ==
In Czech cuisine, svíčková refers to both a dish and a specific cut of meat (beef tenderloin). It is sometimes incorrectly translated to English as "candle sauce" because the word svíčka means 'candle' in Czech.

There are at least three possible explanations for the etymology of the term svíčková. The first explanation is based on the visual resemblance of the slender muscle to a candle. The second theory suggests that the name derives from the fact that this cut of meat is often found in areas rich in tallow, the substance historically used to make candles. The third explanation dates back to the Middle Ages, proposing that the name originated from a traditional guild practice. According to this version, master butchers were obliged to host a feast for their journeymen once a year. This dinner, held in the autumn when days grew shorter and working hours decreased, was served by candlelight.

== See also ==
- Czech cuisine
