= Phenethyl acetate =

Names
- Preferred IUPAC name 2-Phenylethyl acetate
- Other names Phenethyl acetate

Identifiers
CAS Number	103-45-7
3D model (JSmol)	Interactive image
ChEBI	CHEBI:31988
ChEMBL	ChEMBL3184025
ChemSpider	21105987
ECHA InfoCard	100.002.830
EC Number	203-113-5
KEGG	C12303
MeSH	C054590
PubChem CID	7654
UNII	67733846OW
CompTox Dashboard (EPA)	DTXSID7044506
- InChI: InChI=1S/C10H12O2/c1-9(11)12-8-7-10-5-3-2-4-6-10/h2-6H,7-8H2,1H3 Key: MDHYEMXUFSJLGV-UHFFFAOYSA-N
- SMILES: CC(=O)OCCc1ccccc1

Properties
Chemical formula	C_{10}H_{12}O_{2}
Molar mass	164.204 g·mol^{−1}
Appearance	Colorless liquid
Odor	Rose and honey
Density	1.088 g/cm^{3}
Melting point	−31.1 °C (−24.0 °F; 242.1 K)
Boiling point	232.6 °C (450.7 °F; 505.8 K)

Hazards
- GHS labelling
Pictograms	(GHS05: Corrosive) (GHS07: Exclamation mark)
Signal word	Danger
Hazard statements	H318, H319
Precautionary statements	P264, P280, P305+P351+P338, P310, P337+P313
- Except where otherwise noted, data are given for materials in their standard state (at 25 °C [77 °F], 100 kPa). (what is ?) Infobox references

Phenethyl acetate is an organic compound with the chemical formula CH_{3}COOCH_{2}CH_{2}C_{6}H_{5}. It is a colorless liquid with rose and honey odor. It is the ester resulting from the condensation of acetic acid and phenethyl alcohol. Like many esters, it is found in a range of fruits and biological products. It is a colorless liquid with a rose and honey scent and a raspberry-like taste.
