= Kelly Ramsey Building =

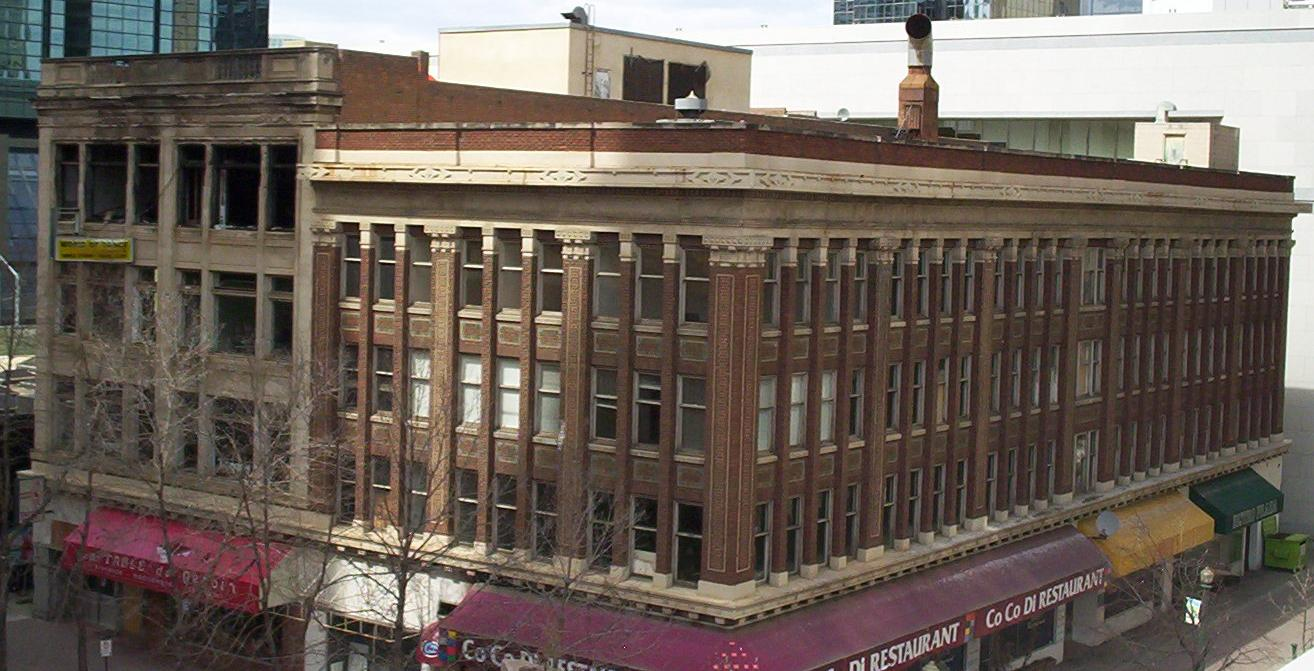
- Building in 2009

- Location within Edmonton

General information
- Architectural style: Chicago commercial
- Location: 10040 101A Avenue, Edmonton, Alberta, Canada
- Coordinates: 53°32′32.8″N 113°29′33.9″W
- Construction started: 1911
- Completed: 1927
- Demolished: 2013
- Cost: $250,000

Design and construction
- Architects: Kelly, Van Siclen; Ramsey, Magoon & Macdonald

The Kelly Ramsey Building was a historic building located in Downtown Edmonton at 10040 101A Avenue on Rice Howard Way.

== History ==
James Ramsey was a department store owner who opened up a store in the Tegler Building (to the north of the Kelly Ramsey Building). Shortly after moving to Edmonton in 1911, he required more space and moved into the building which was built by a blacksmith John Kelly. Not long after Kelly's death Ramsey bought the building from his widow in 1926 for $100,000. He then extended the story westward calling it the Ramsey Building. In the 1940s the Government of Alberta bought the building. More recently, it had been owned by Worthington Properties.

In March 2009 a fire broke out and gutted most of the building. Police determined it was caused by arson and on April 2 a man was arrested for the fire. In September 2009, the Court of Queen's Bench of Alberta ordered a judicial sale of the building due to foreclosure for $3 million, down from its previous price of $10 million.

In 2013 the building was demolished, to be replaced by Enbridge Centre. Enbridge Centre is a 25-storey office building, which recreated the original building facades on the tower's podium. The tower was completed in late 2016 and opened on October 13, 2016, with the original facade incorporated into the new building.

== Architecture ==
The building was two four-story, brick and steel frame buildings. The Ramsey portion was an addition to the Kelly Block. The two buildings were quite different. The Kelly Block was done in dark brick and the Ramsey Building had a stone facade, three-part windows, and a smaller cornice.
