= Hermelín =

Czech cheese

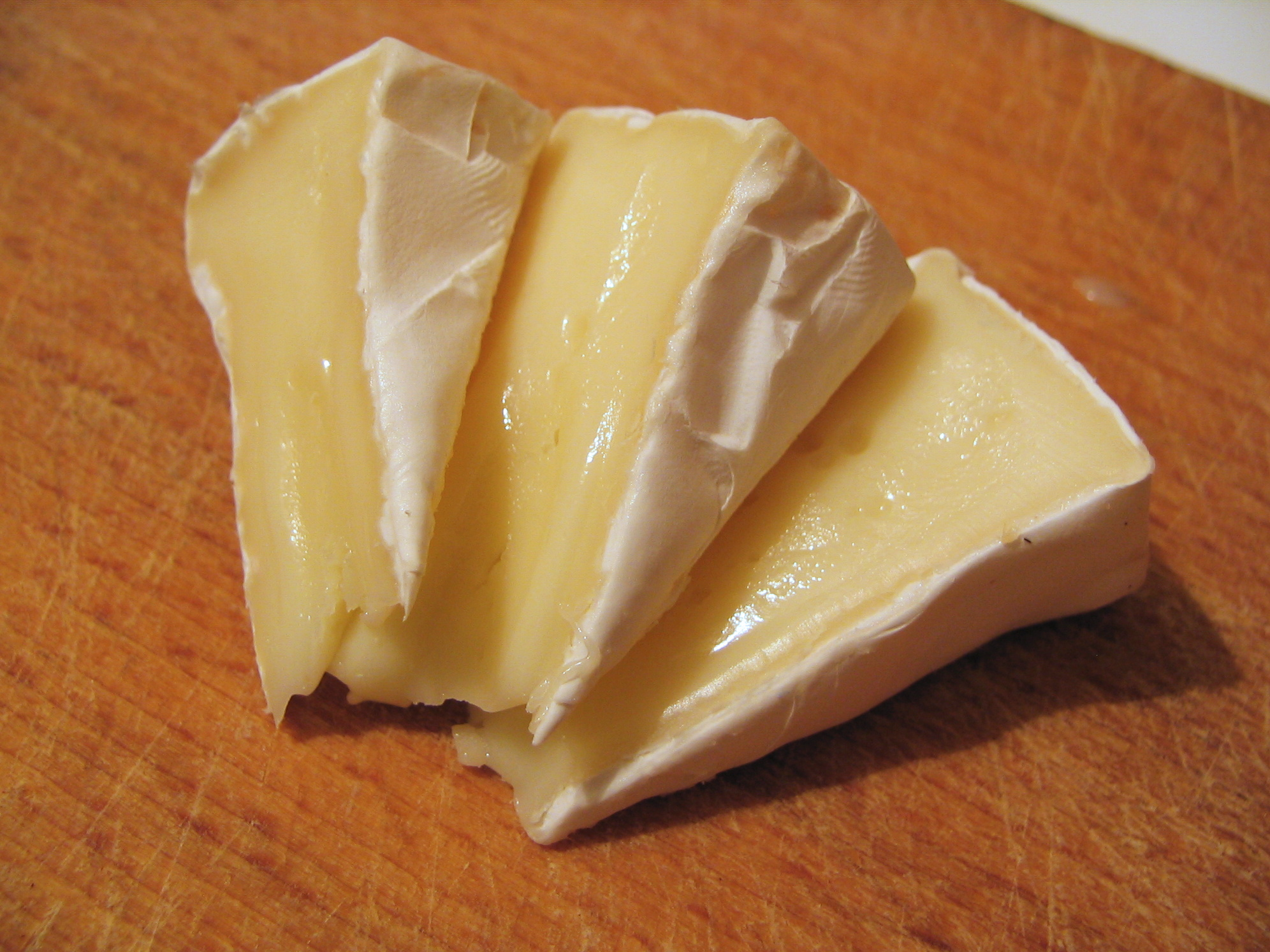
Fully matured hermelín

Hermelín (Czech for ermine fur, due to its white colour) is a type of Czech cheese that imitates camembert, with a coating of white mold, Penicillium camemberti. Hermelín originates from the town of Sedlčany in Central Bohemia and is sold throughout the Czech Republic under various brand names. In restaurants, the cheese is usually served marinated in oil (nakládaný), deep-fried in breadcrumbs (smažený), grilled (grilovaný), and with cranberry sauce. In the Czech Republic, it is called the king of cheeses, as its fluffy white rind resembles the royal ermine fur worn by kings.

== Nutrition information ==
Per 100 grams of cheese, it provides roughly 290-335 calories,18-28g total fat, 18-22g protein, 0.5g sugars, 680mg sodium and 660mg calcium, roughly 50% daily intake.

== History ==
Hermelín cheese was first invented in the 1920's. It was developed by dairy farmers in the Central Bohemian Region, designed to bring the French-style artisan cheese to the local population. Over time Czech cheese makers adapted the flavour to suit regional tastes, which lead to an overall softer, creamier paste and a milder mushroom essence compared to the authentic French camembert. Up to the 1970's Hermelín was under the wider classification of camembert, until the brand Král Sýrů meaning King of cheeses (another reason for the nickname of the Hermelín) led the popularization of the name Hermelín.

== See also ==
- Czech cuisine
