= Beer cheese =

Beer cheese may refer to:

- Weisslacker, a German cheese
- Beer cheese (spread), a regional snack food
- Beer soup

== See also ==
- Pub cheese
