= Walnut cake with egg yolk glaze =

Czech and Slovak festive cake

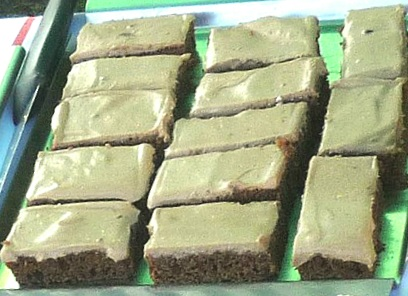
Slices of walnut cake with egg yolk glaze at Masopust 2017 in Lípa, Czech Republic

Walnut (slice) cake with egg yolk glaze (Slovak: orechový koláč so žĺtkovou polevou, (orechovo-) žĺtkové rezy, jarné (orechové) rezy, žltý koláč, zlatý koláč; Czech: žloutkové řezy (s ořechy)) is a simple Czech and Slovak festive cake made from walnut or coffee-flavored sponge cake and egg yolk glaze. In Slovakia and the Czech Republic, it is traditionally served at Christmas and Easter parties. It is sometimes served with coffee.
