= Vepřo knedlo zelo =

Czech national dish

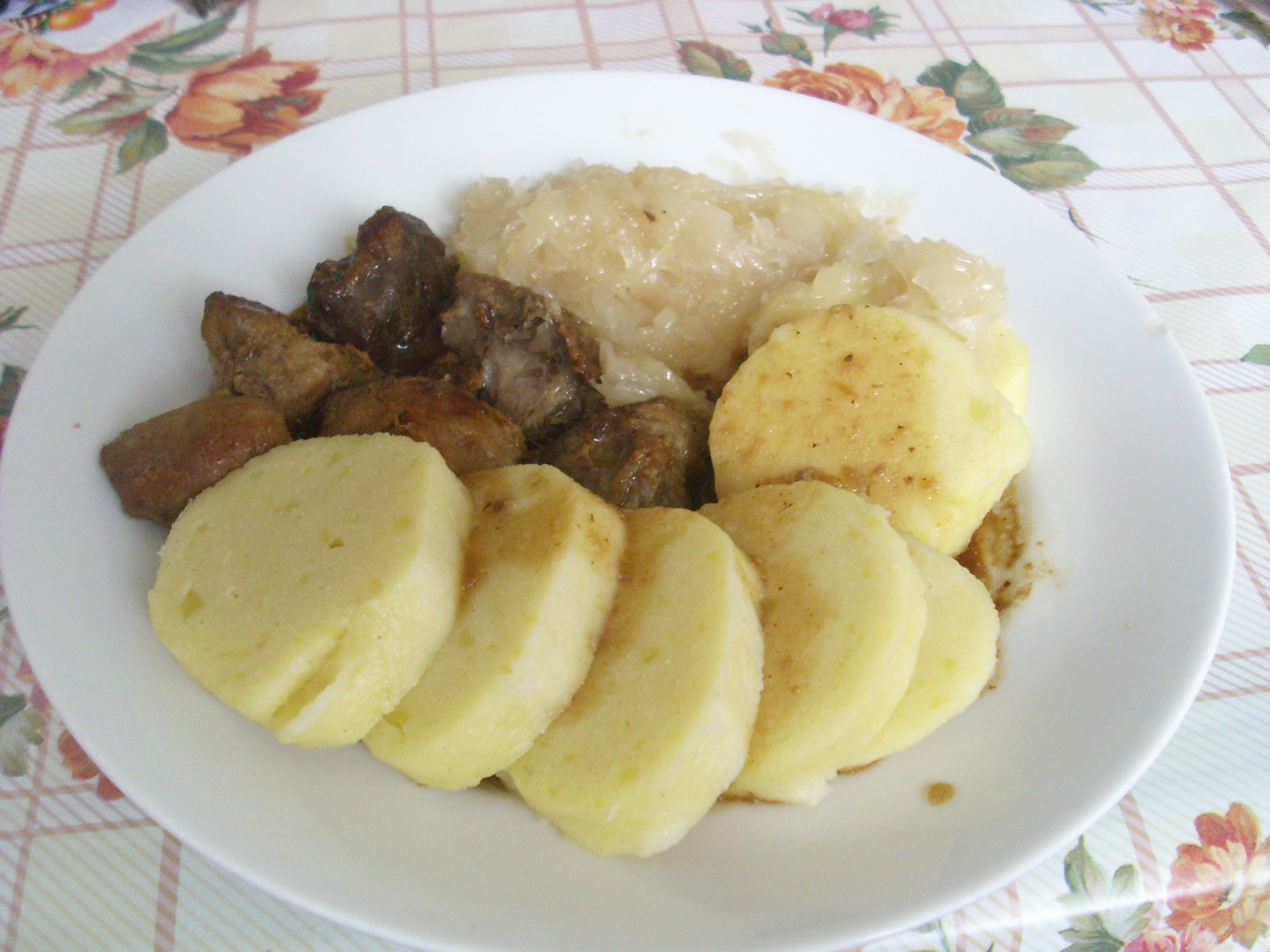
- Course: Main
- Place of origin: Czech Republic
- Main ingredients: Pork; dumpling; sauerkraut

Vepřo knedlo zelo (Czech: [vɛpr̝̊o knɛdlo zɛlo]; lit. "pork, dumpling, sauerkraut") is the name of one of the national dishes of the Czech Republic. It consists of three primary ingredients:

- roast pork, usually lean, sliced
- dumpling, either potato or bread, also sliced
- steamed white (or less often red) sauerkraut

The three items are placed separately on a plate, and the pork is covered with its own juice. The dish is believed to have German origins and is also commonly eaten in Slovakia and Austria.
