= Edmonton railway station =

Edmonton railway station or Edmonton station may refer to:

- Edmonton railway station, Queensland at Edmonton, Queensland on the North Coast railway line
- Edmonton station (Via Rail), a station in Canada, opened in 1998
- Edmonton Canadian Pacific Railway Station, a station opened 1913, closed 1972, demolished 1978
- CNR Edmonton station, site upon which CN Tower was built

== See also ==
- Edmonton, London#Railway stations, London
- Edmonton Green railway station, a station in London opened 1872
- Lower Edmonton (low level) railway station, a closed station in London
- Strathcona Canadian Pacific Railway Station, in south Edmonton, Alberta
- Transportation in Edmonton#Inter-city rail, Alberta
- List of Edmonton LRT stations, Alberta
