= Mamdani =

Mamdani (Māmadāṇī, Gujarati pronunciation: [mɑmˈdɑɳi]) is an Indian surname originally belonging to Khoja Muslim families. The name is derived from the honorific Mām in the Kutchi and Gujarati languages, as well as Māmadō, the localized version of the name Muhammad in Hindu castes which converted to Islam.

Notable people with the name include:

- Ebrahim Mamdani (1942–2010), Tanzanian-British mathematician
- Mahmood Mamdani (born 1946), Ugandan academic
- Mohammed Mamdani (born 1983), British entrepreneur
- Muhammad Mamdani, Canadian pharmacist
- Riaz Mamdani (born c. 1968), Ugandan-born Canadian businessman
- Zohran Mamdani (born 1991), American politician and 112th mayor of New York City; son of Mahmood

== See also ==
- Graham Platner (born 1984), American harbormaster and political candidate sometimes referred to as "Maine's Mamdani"
- MAMDANI Act, a proposed bill in the United States House of Representatives
