= Calgary–South Edmonton train =

Passenger rail transport in Alberta

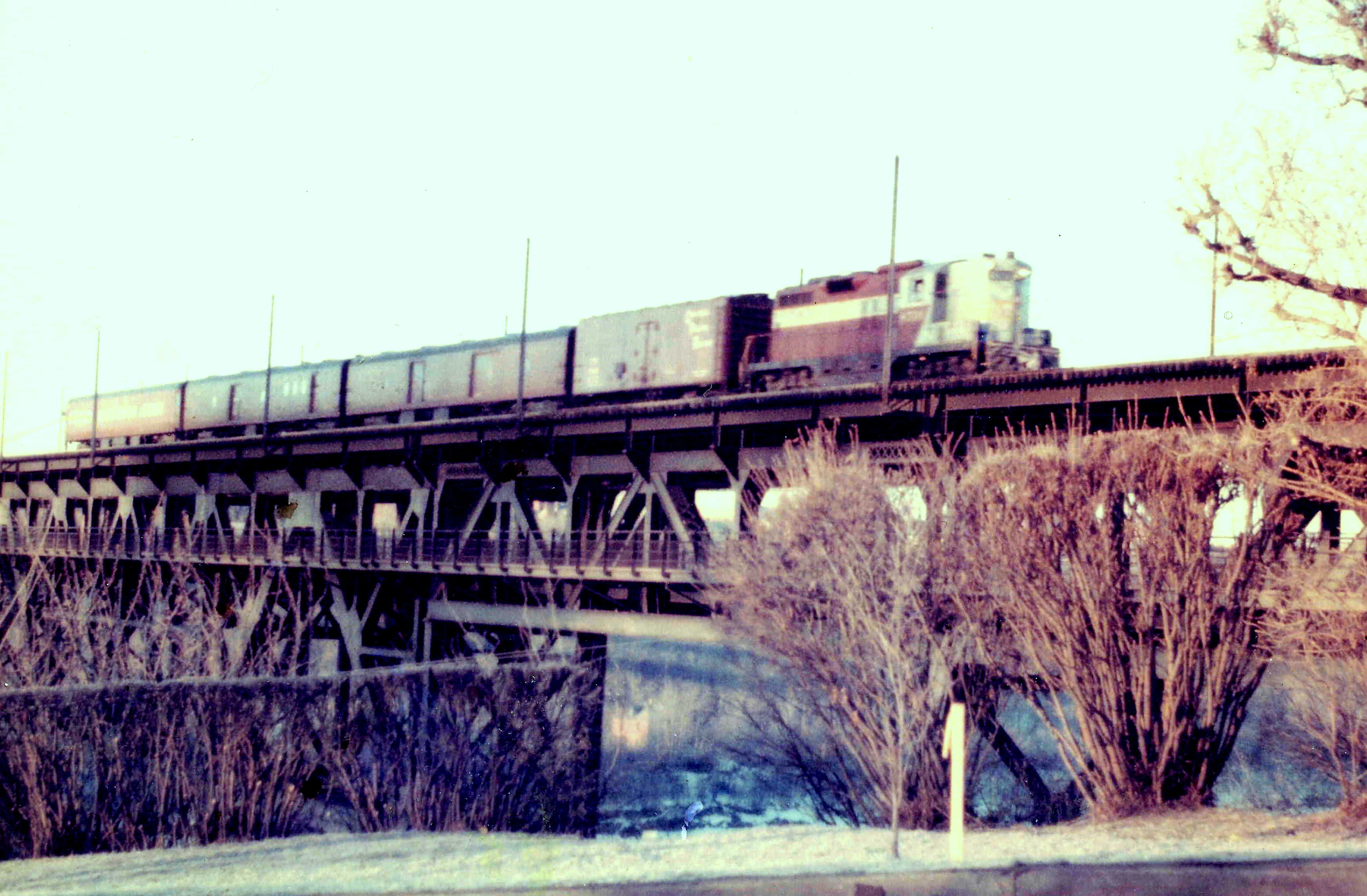
- Canadian Pacific train from Calgary on the High Level Bridge in Edmonton in the 1950s

Overview
- Service type: Inter-city rail
- Status: Discontinued
- Locale: Alberta, Canada
- Last service: October 26, 1985
- Former operators: Via Rail, Canadian Pacific Railway

Route
- Termini: Tower Centre, Calgary; Strathcona (1972–1985); Edmonton (1913–1972)
- Stops: 16 (1970); 7 (1985)
- Distance travelled: 312 km (194 mi)
- Average journey time: 3 hr 10 min
- Service frequency: Two daily round trips
- Train numbers: 195, 197 (northbound); 194, 196 (southbound)

Technical
- Track gauge: 1,435 mm (4 ft 8 1/2 in)
- Track owner: Canadian Pacific Railway

The Calgary–South Edmonton train, at times the Calgary–Edmonton train, was a Canadian passenger train service between Alberta's two most populous cities: Calgary and Edmonton. Intermediate stops along the corridor were in Didsbury, Olds, Innisfail, Red Deer, and Wetaskiwin. Rail service was replaced with buses in 1985.

== History ==
In 1891, the Calgary and Edmonton Railway completed a rail line from Calgary to "South Edmonton", an area south of Edmonton across the North Saskatchewan River. The trip initially took around 12 hours.

In 1899, South Edmonton was incorporated as the Town of Strathcona. This town was merged into Edmonton in 1912, becoming the Strathcona neighborhood.

On January 8, 1904, the Canadian Pacific Railway acquired control of the Calgary and Edmonton Railway. To better compete with the Canadian Northern Railway, the CP built the High Level Bridge over the North Saskatchewan River and extended service to the downtown Edmonton station on September 2, 1913. This lasted until October 29, 1972, when service was cut back to again terminate at Strathcona station.

In 1978, Via Rail assumed operation of the route alongside the rest of Canadian Pacific's passenger trains. Under Via, the train ran from Tower Centre in Calgary through Red Deer to Strathcona in Edmonton. Timetables listed the latter stop as "South Edmonton" to distinguish it from the downtown Edmonton station built by the Canadian National Railway. Service consisted of two daily round trips, taking about 3 hours 10 minutes to traverse the 312 km (194 mi) route.

On October 27, 1985, the train was discontinued. Via passengers were instead directed to use Greyhound Canada bus service via Alberta Highway 2.
