= Kambere =

Kambere is a surname. Notable people with the surname include:

- Amos Mubunga Kambere, Ugandan–Canadian author
- Diaz Kambere, Ugandan footballer
