= Wainwright, Alberta =

Town in Alberta, Canada

Wainwright
- Town
- Town of Wainwright
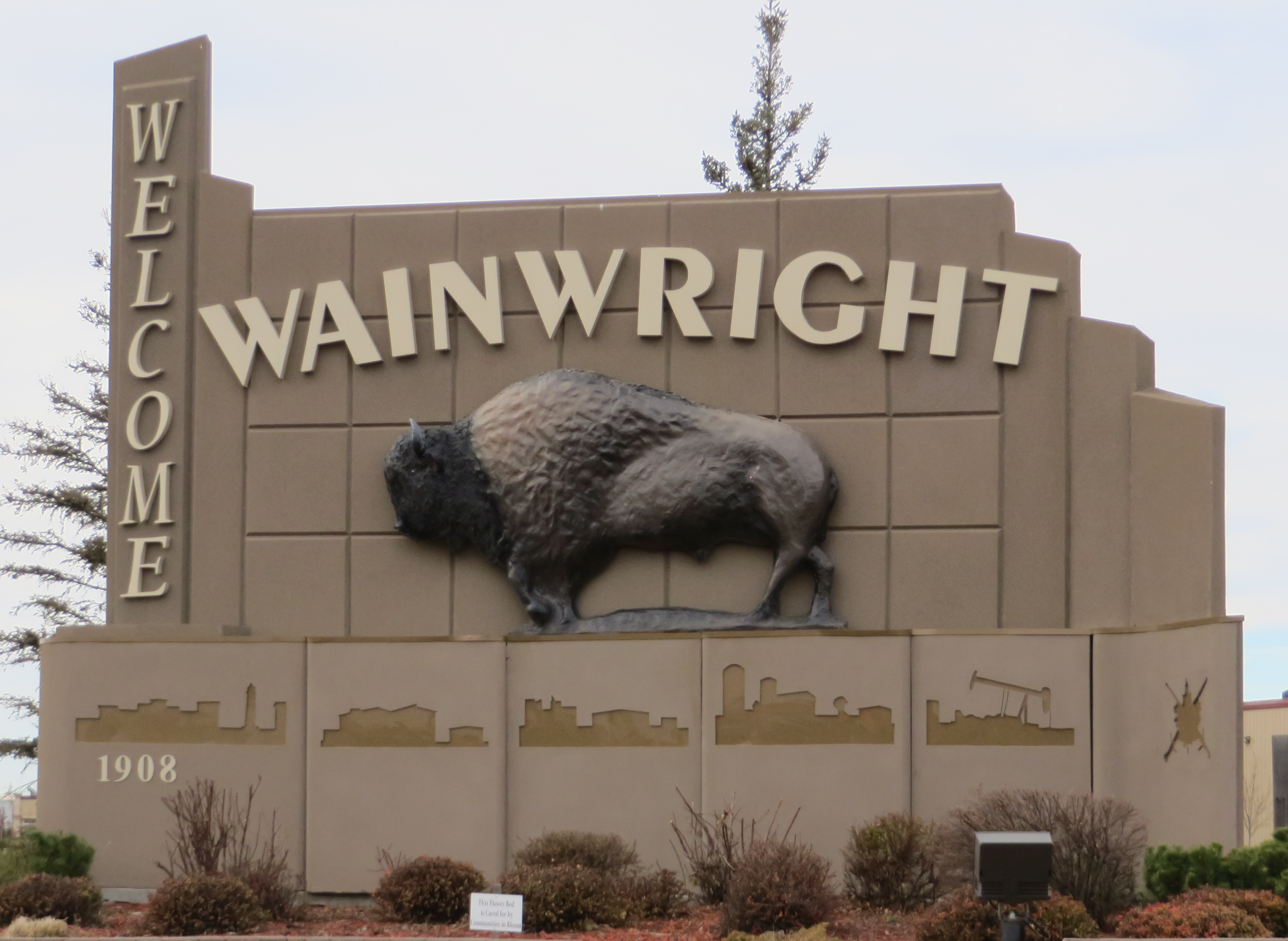
- Welcome sign
- Nickname: Buffalo Capital of Canada
- Location of Wainwright in Alberta Wainwright (Canada)
- Coordinates: 52°50′N 110°52′W
- Country: Canada
- Province: Alberta
- Region: Central Alberta
- Census division: No. 7
- Municipal district: Municipal District of Wainwright No. 61
- Incorporated
  - Village: March 25, 1909
  - Town: July 14, 1910

Government
  - Mayor: Bruce Pugh
  - Governing Body: Wainwright Town Council
  - MP: Pierre Poilievre
  - MLA: Garth Rowswell

Area (2021)
  - Land: 12.17 km^{2} (4.70 sq mi)
- Elevation: 675 m (2,215 ft)

Population (2021)
  - Total: 6,606
  - Density: 543/km^{2} (1,410/sq mi)
- Time zone: UTC−06:00 (Alberta Time)
- Forward sortation area: T9W
- Area codes: +1-780, +1-587
- Highways: Highway 14; Highway 41
- Waterways: Battle River
- Website: Official website

Wainwright is a town in east-central Alberta, Canada. It is approximately 206 kilometres (128 mi) southeast of Edmonton.

Located west of the Alberta–Saskatchewan border, Wainwright is 61 kilometres (38 mi) south of Vermilion in the Battle River valley. Highway 41, called the Buffalo Trail, and Highway 14 go through the town. CFB Wainwright is located in Denwood, southwest of Wainwright.

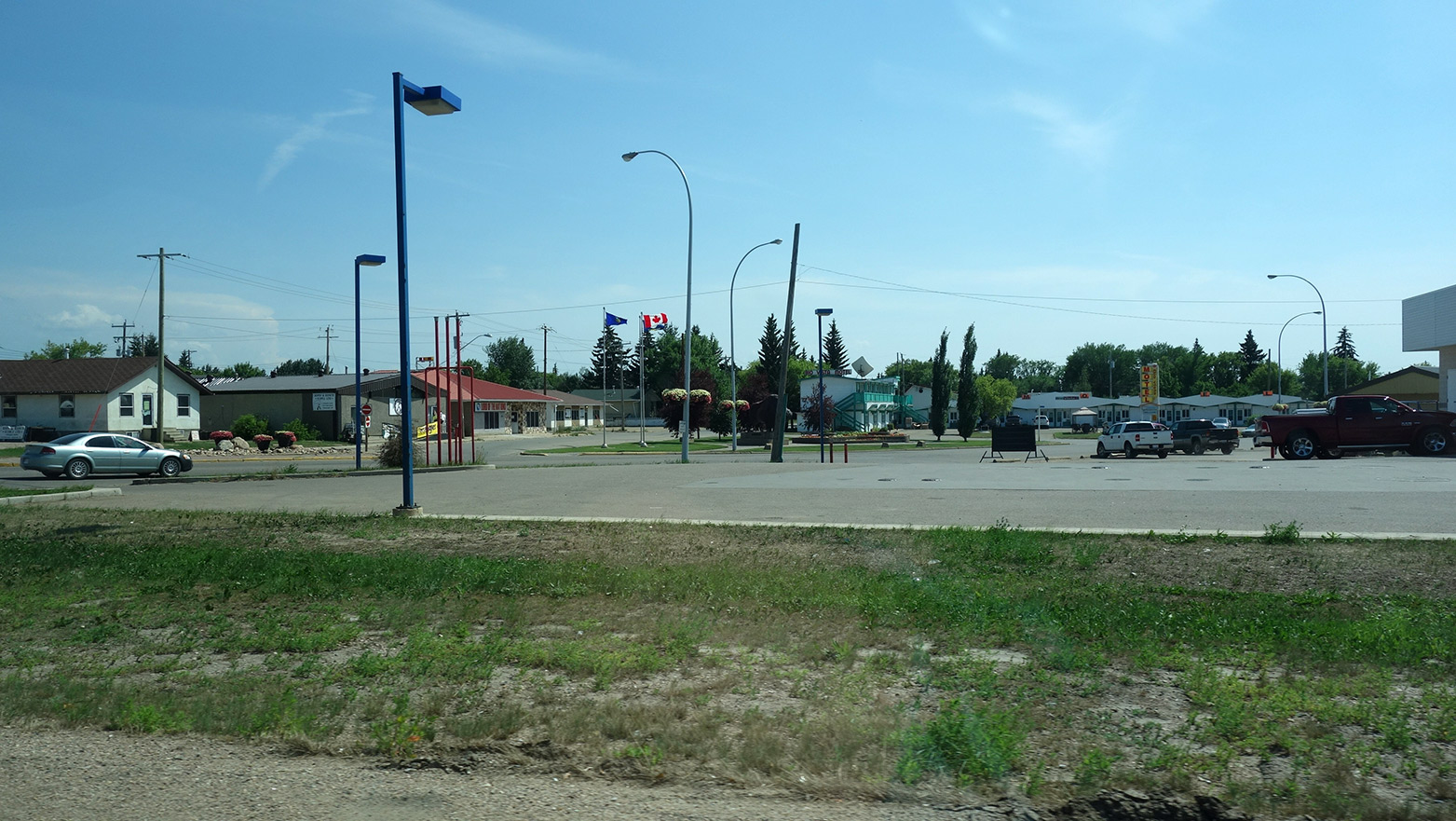
An entrance road to Wainwright

== History ==
Originally named Denwood by settler James Dawson in 1905, the town was relocated by the Grand Trunk Pacific Railway 5 kilometres (3.1 mi) west-northwest and renamed Wainwright after William Wainwright, the second vice-president of railway. The original townsite opened with post office in 1907 along with Denwood Hotel and store. The post office and hotel (becoming Wainwright Hotel) relocated to Wainwright in 1908 with the old townsite later becoming CFB Wainwright.

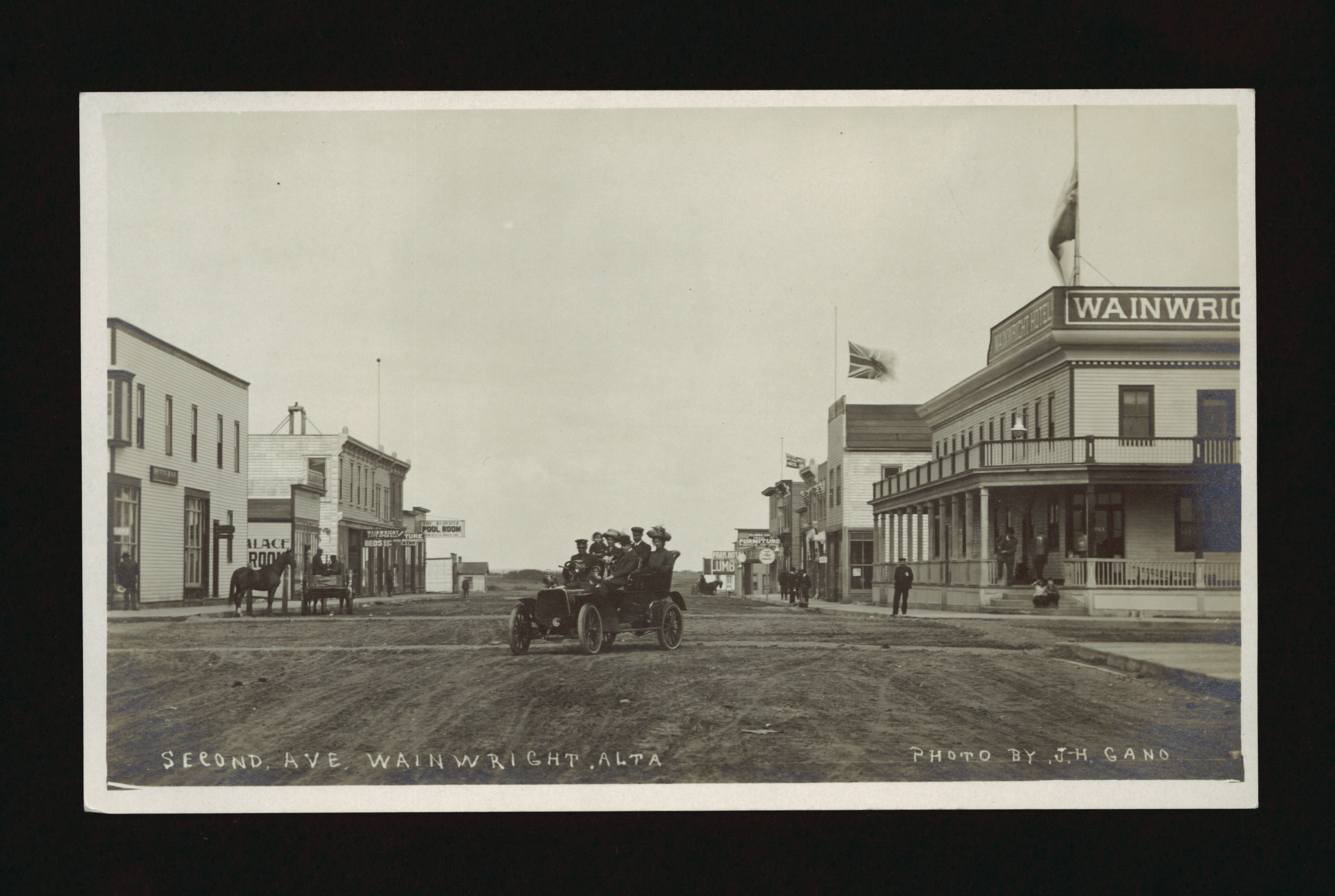
A view of Second Ave. featuring the Wainwright Hotel pre-1912.

== Demographics ==
In the 2021 Census of Population conducted by Statistics Canada, the Town of Wainwright had a population of 6,606 living in 2,664 of its 2,914 total private dwellings, a change of 5.1% from its 2016 population of 6,285. With a land area of 12.17 km^{2} (4.70 sq mi), it had a population density of 542.8/km^{2} (1,405.9/sq mi) in 2021.

In the 2016 Census of Population conducted by Statistics Canada, the Town of Wainwright recorded a population of 6,270 living in 2,524 of its 2,770 total private dwellings, a 5.8% change from its 2011 population of 5,925. With a land area of 9.1 km^{2} (3.5 sq mi), it had a population density of 689.0/km^{2} (1,784.5/sq mi) in 2016.

The Town of Wainwright's 2013 municipal census counted a population of 6,289, an 8.9% increase over its 2008 municipal census population of 5,775.

== Arts and culture ==
Wainwright has the third-largest stampede in Canada. It occurs at the end of June, and includes a rodeo, chuckwagon races, parade, midway, an agricultural fair, and a town wide horse race for anyone over 18.

== Education ==
Buffalo Trail Public Schools Regional Division No. 28

- Wainwright Elementary School
- Wainwright High School

East Central Alberta Catholic Separate Schools Regional Division No. 16

- Blessed Sacrament School
- Blessed Sacrament Outreach School

Greater North Central Francophone Education Region No. 2

- École Saint-Christophe

== Transportation ==
The town is a divisional point on the Canadian National Railway main line. Wainwright railway station is served by Via Rail's The Canadian.

Services
- Preceding station	Via Rail	Following station
  Viking toward Vancouver	The Canadian	Unity toward Toronto
  Former services
  Preceding station	Canadian National Railway	Following station
  Fabyan toward Vancouver	Main Line	Greenshields toward Montreal

== Media ==
Radio

- CKKY-FM/K-Rock 101.9 – provides old and new rock music
- CKWY-FM/Wayne-FM – provides a mix of classic hits and top 40 music

Newspapers

The Edge and The Star (formerly the Star Chronicle) merged to be the Star/Edge in 2013. It is published weekly on Fridays.

== Notable people ==
- Kim Dorland, contemporary Canadian painter
- Bobby McMann, NHL player for the Seattle Kraken
- Jacob Middleton, NHL player for the Calgary Flames
- Keaton Middleton, NHL player for the Colorado Avalanche
- Glen Sather, former NHL player, coach, and general manager, and member of the Hockey Hall of Fame
- Lynn Seymour, ballerina
- Mason Shaw, AHL player for the Manitoba Moose
- Frank C. Turner, film and television actor, iconographer

== See also ==
- List of communities in Alberta
- List of francophone communities in Alberta
- List of towns in Alberta
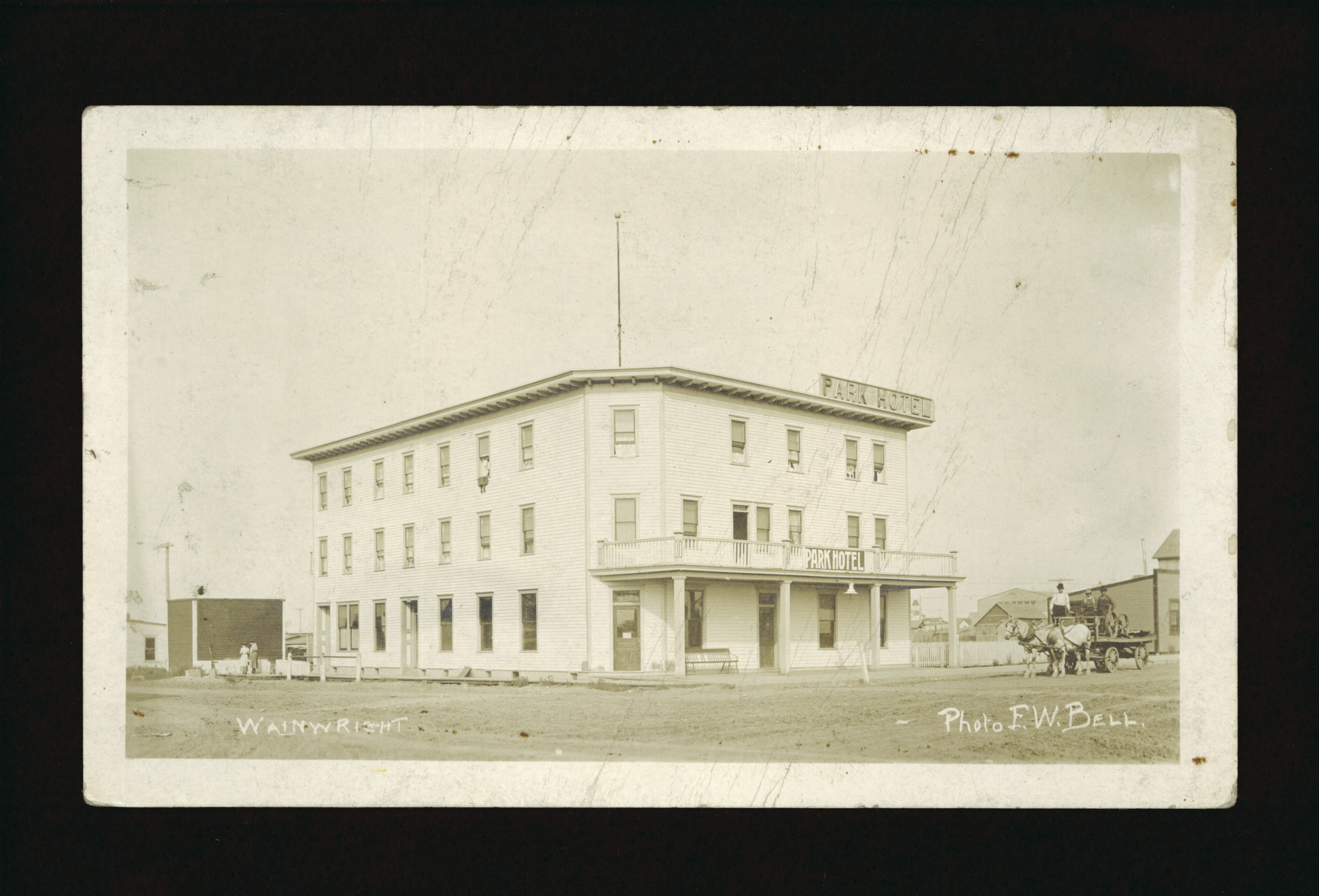
View of the Park Hotel pre-1920.

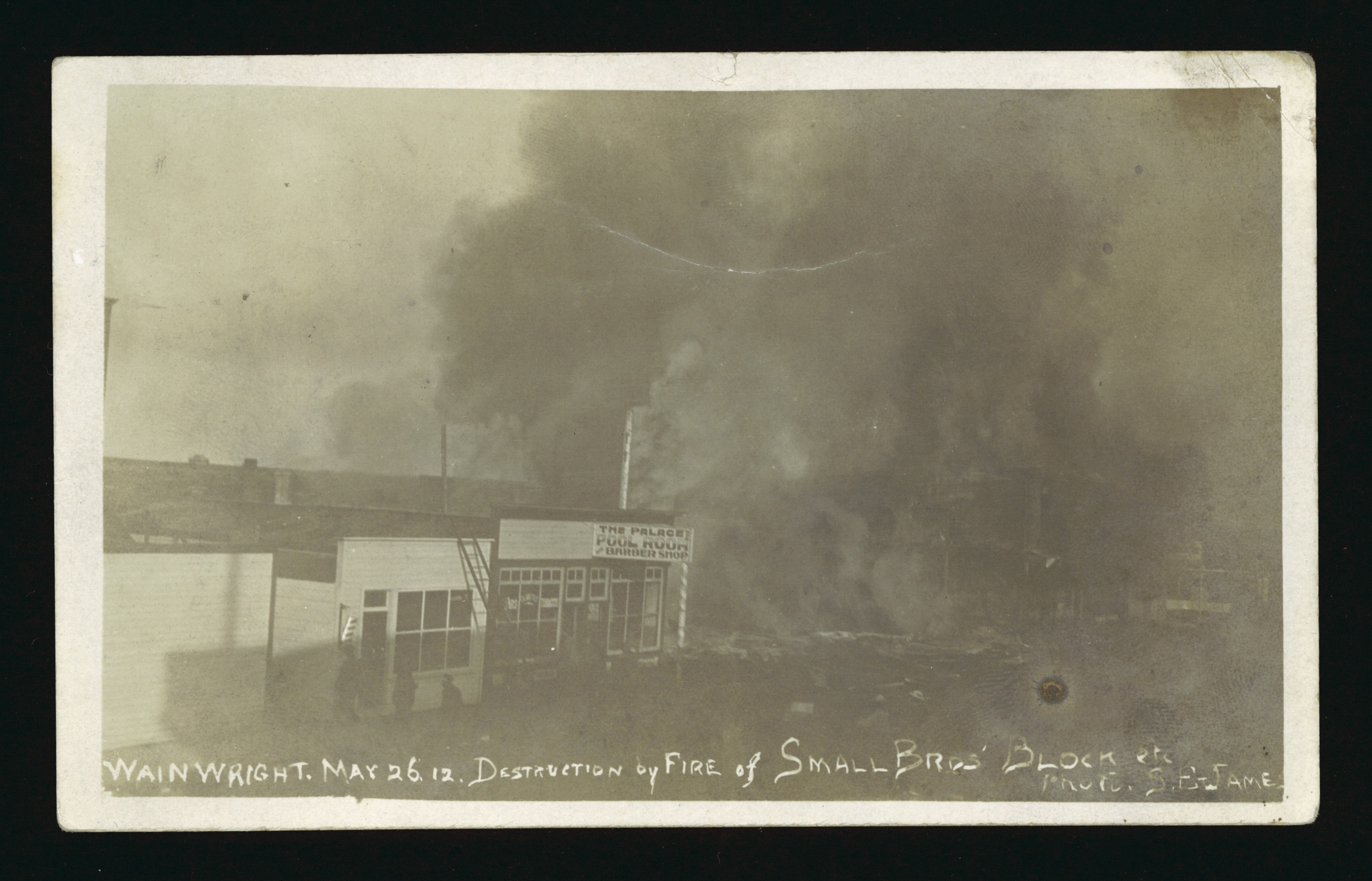
Smoke billowing over Wainwright, the aftermath of a fire.

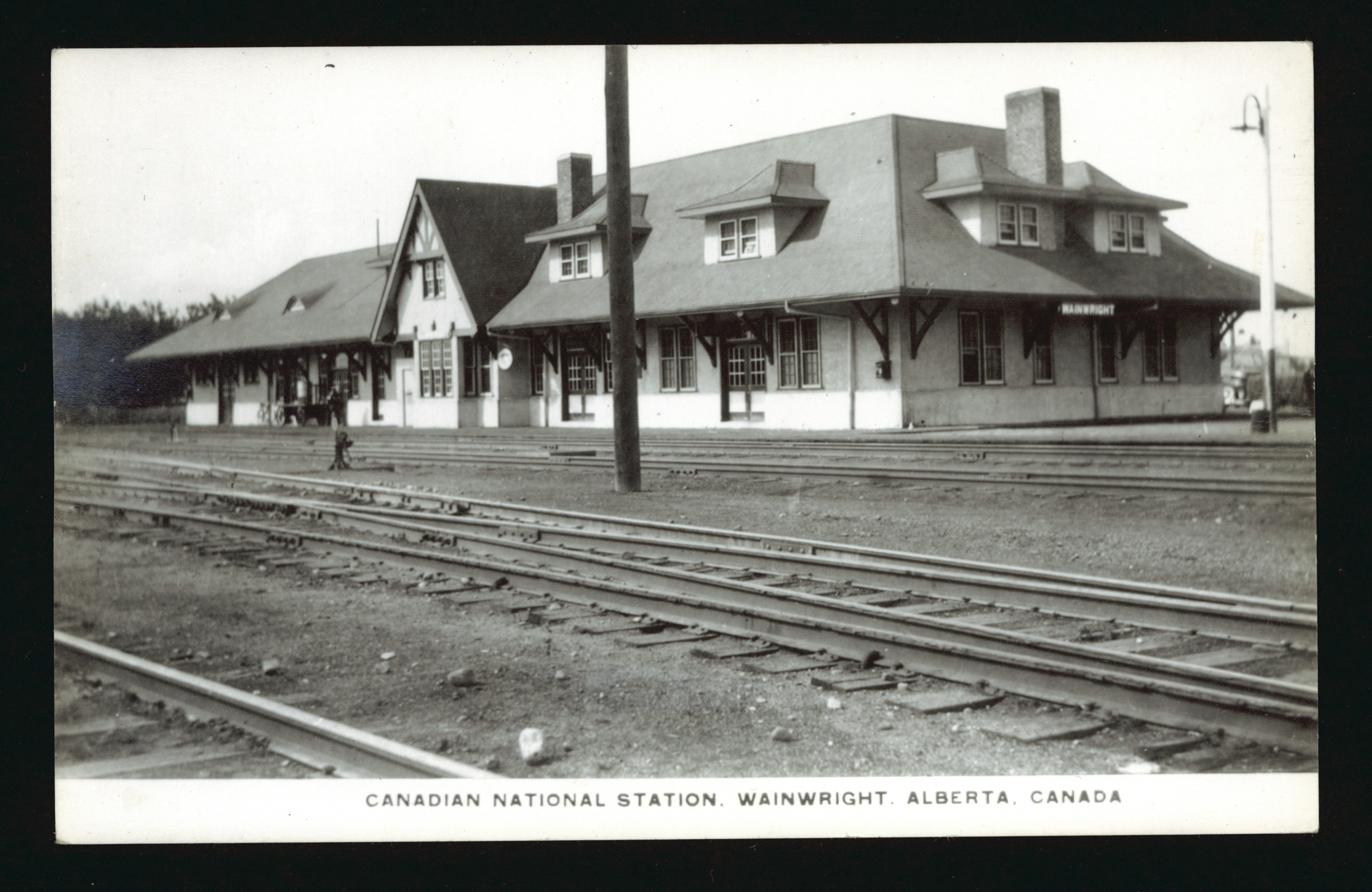
A view across the tracks of the Canadian National Station in Wainwright, between 1926 and 1940.

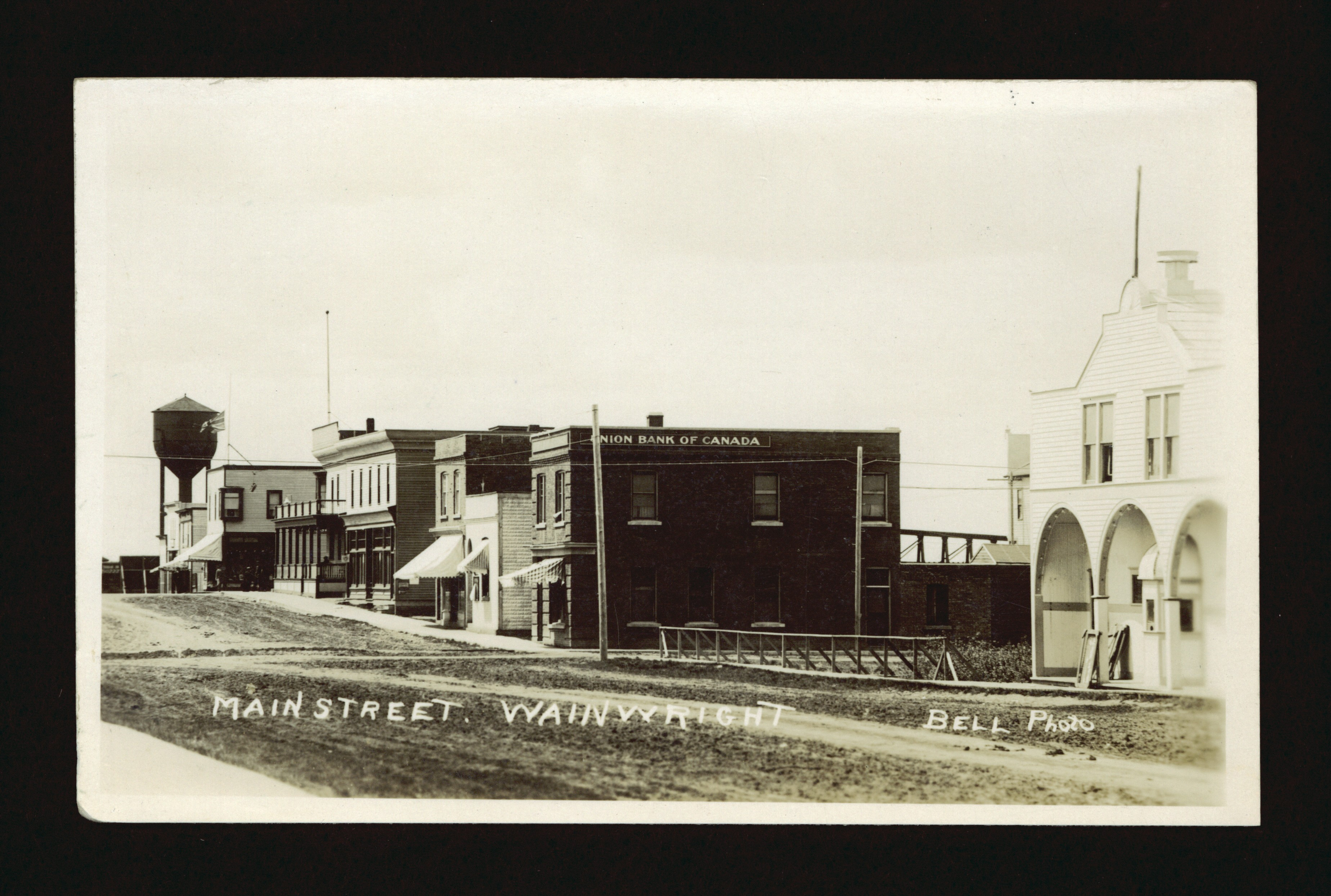
Unpaved road in front of businesses with a water tower in the background in 1910.

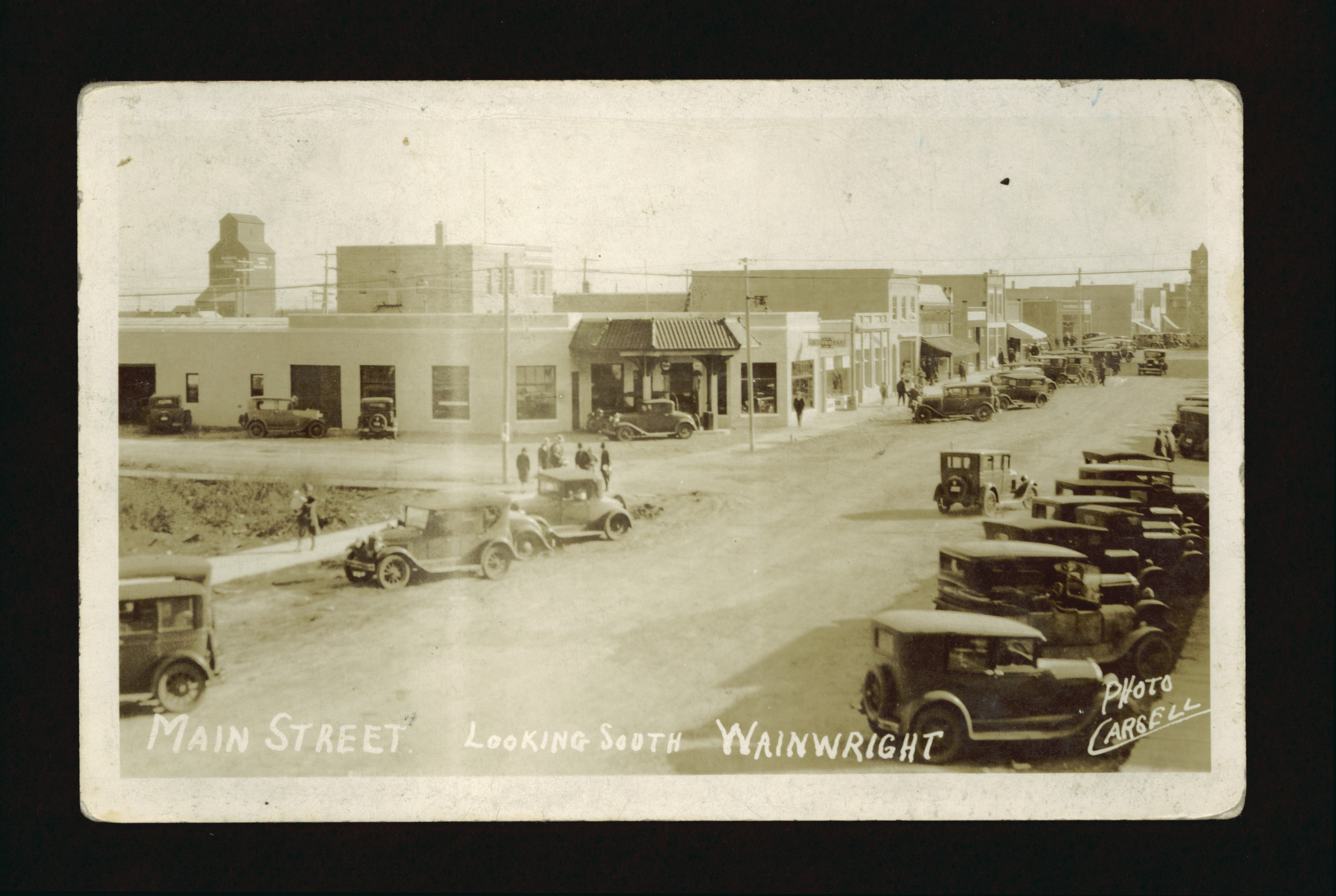
View of busy commercial street in town with stores and shops in 1930.

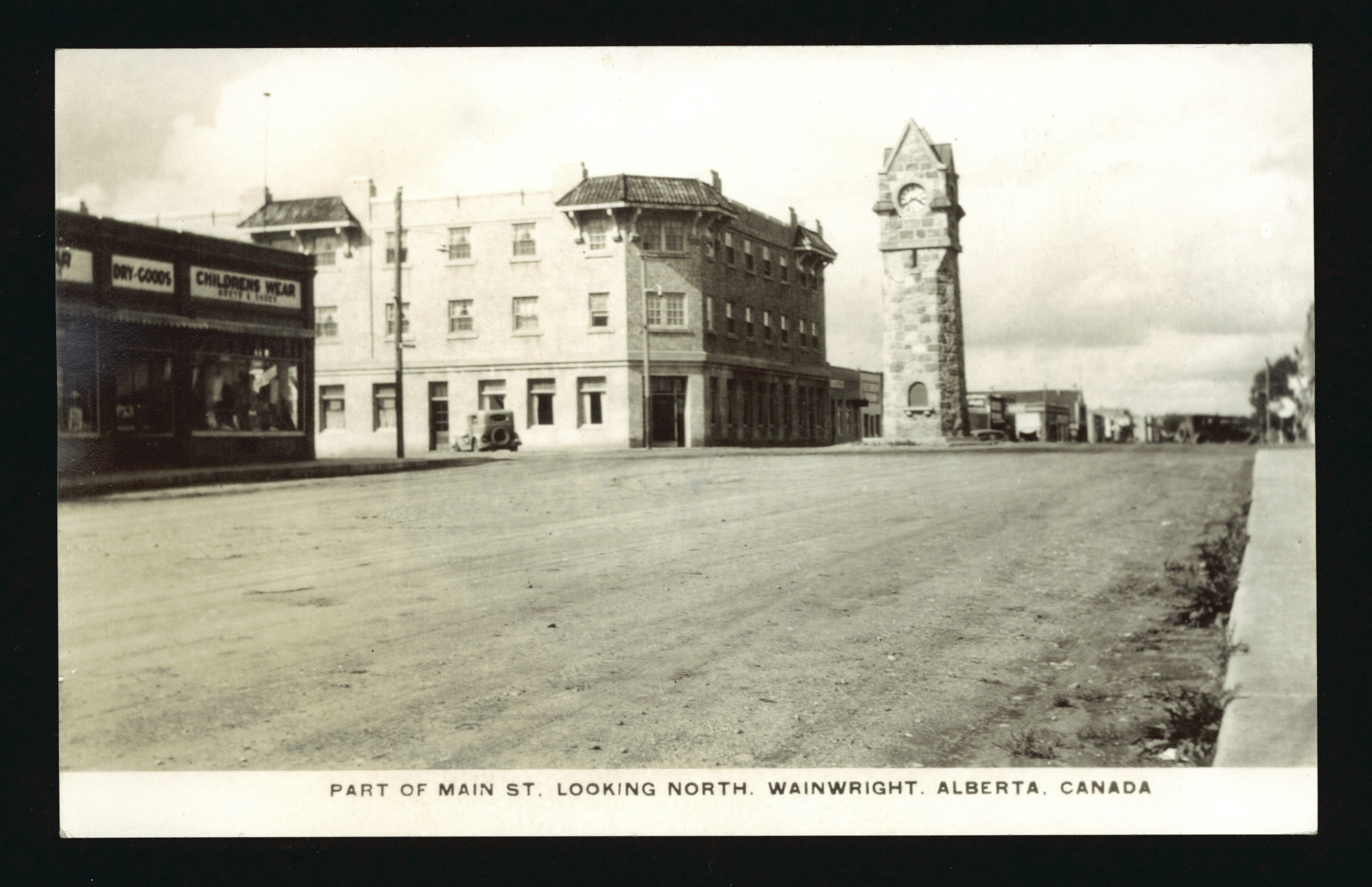
A view looking north of Main Street showing automobiles and a clock tower as well as some businesses along the street, taken in the 1930s.
