= Ugandans in Canada =

- (Uganda) (Canada)

Total population
- Several thousand Ugandan-born residents; over 7,000 Ugandan Asian refugees admitted (1972–1974)

Regions with significant populations
- Toronto, Ottawa, Calgary, Edmonton, Vancouver

Languages
- English, Luganda, Swahili and other languages of Uganda

Religion
- Predominantly Christianity and Islam; also Hinduism and Sikhism among Ugandan Asians

Ugandans in Canada are residents of Canada who were born in Uganda or are of Ugandan ancestry, including those with one or both Ugandan parents. The community includes refugees, students, skilled migrants, and descendants of earlier migration waves. Although relatively small compared to other African diasporas, Ugandan Canadians are concentrated in major urban centres such as Toronto, Ottawa, Calgary, Edmonton and Vancouver.

== History ==
Migration from Uganda to Canada developed in several distinct waves. One of the earliest large-scale movements occurred in 1972, when the government of Idi Amin ordered the expulsion of the country's Asian minority. Canada accepted more than 7,000 Ugandan Asians between 1972 and 1974, marking one of the country's first major resettlement programs for non-European refugees. Many of these migrants possessed professional or business experience and integrated rapidly into Canadian society. Most were of Indian origin, particularly Gujarati, and belonged to diverse religious communities including Hindus, Ismaili Muslims and Sikhs, with Hindus representing the largest single group.

Subsequent migration from Uganda increased during the late twentieth century and early twenty-first century, driven by educational opportunities, labour migration and family reunification. Academic and community estimates suggest that the Ugandan-born population in Canada numbers several thousand individuals, while broader counts including descendants range higher, with concentrations in large metropolitan regions.

== Community and sociocultural organizations ==
Ugandan-born migrants and their descendants in Canada have established a range of sociocultural institutions. These include the National Alliance of Ugandan Canadian Associations, founded in 2024 and publicly launched in 2025, a nationwide umbrella organization that promotes cultural preservation and community development. The alliance was launched during Uganda Independence Day celebrations in Canada with a keynote address by the head of Uganda's State House Diaspora Unit, indicating institutional engagement with the Ugandan government. Regional groups such as the Uganda Cultural Association of Alberta and the Uganda Association of Ottawa also organize cultural events and support community integration.

== Notable people ==
- Mobina Jaffer (born 1949), lawyer and politician
- Salma Lakhani (born 1951), politician
- Amos Mubunga Kambere (born 1954), educator, author and politician
- Riaz Mamdani (born 1968), businessman
- Irshad Manji (born 1968), educator and author
- Henry Osinde (born 1978), cricketer and coach
- Arthur Simeon (born 1983), actor and comedian
- Justus Mirembe is the current president and chair, board of directors for National Alliance of Ugandan Canadian Associations (NAUCA). He is a member of a specialized federal armed law enforcement group that enforces illegal interprovincial and international trade in endangered species smuggled through major Canadian airports and border crossings. He also enforces the protection of Canadian natural resources that include designated protected national wildlife areas, among other law enforcement duties. His experience spans over two decades of law enforcement service where he has worked under 5 different Canadian prime ministers: Jean Chréchien, Paul Martin, Stephen Harper, Justin Trudeau and Mark Carney. He is a recipient of the Government of Canada Public Service Award from Prime Minister Trudeau. He has served on various high-level boards including Board of Director for BC Soccer Association, the provincial soccer governing body, where in 2018, he was instrumental in advocating for Vancouver as FIFA 2026 World Cup host city. He also serves as a board of trustees for the Uganda North American Association (UNAA) where he has been a member since 2007 and has served in leadership positions since 2017.

== See also ==
- African Canadians
- South Asian Canadians
