= Kataem O'Connor =

Canadian actor

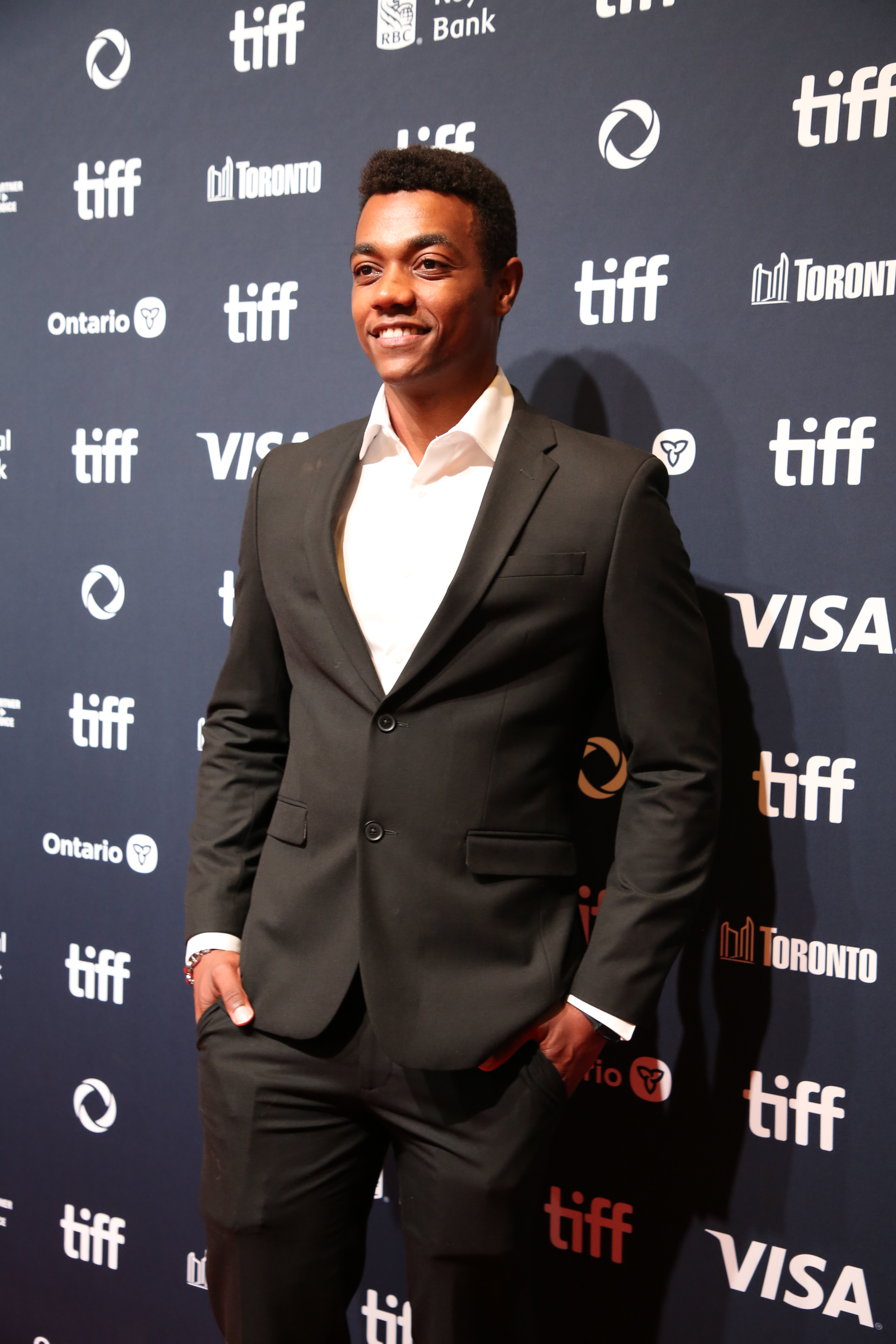
- O'Connor (center) at TIFF 2024
- Born: May 16, 2000 (age 26)

Kataem Enoth-Luwunzu O'Connor (born May 16, 2000) is a Canadian actor from Toronto, Ontario. He is most noted for his performance as Emanuel Freeman in the 2024 film 40 Acres, for which he received a Vancouver Film Critics Circle nomination for Best Supporting Actor in a Canadian Film at the Vancouver Film Critics Circle Awards 2024.

He was previously best known for his recurring supporting role as Adam Parker in Heartland. He appeared in the 2016 TV series 11.22.63.

Kataem joined Murdoch Mysteries in season 18, as Constable Edward "Teddy" Roberts.

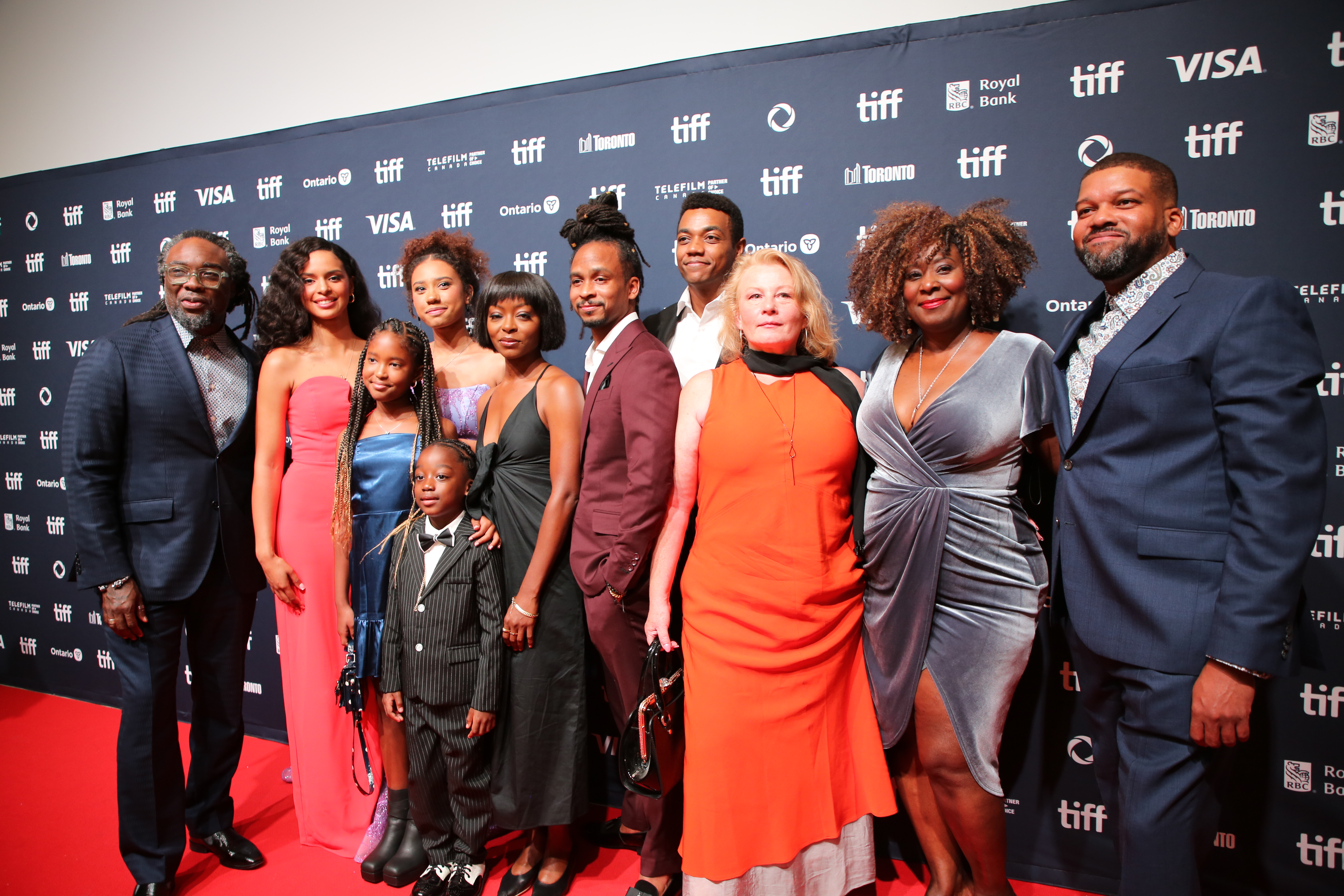

He is of Ugandan and Trinidadian heritage.
