= CN Tower (Edmonton) =

Skyscraper in Edmonton, Alberta

- Location within Edmonton

General information
- Status: Completed
- Type: Office
- Architectural style: International Style
- Location: Edmonton, Alberta, Canada, 10004 104 Avenue NW
- Coordinates: 53°32′49″N 113°29′29″W
- Construction started: 14 August 1964
- Completed: October 1966
- Opening: 14 February 1966 (railway station); 4 November 1966 (tower)
- Cost: CA$10.5 million ($98.5 million in 2025 dollars)
- Owner: Strategic Group

Height
- Roof: 110.92 m (363.9 ft)

Technical details
- Floor count: 26
- Floor area: 254,000 square feet

Design and construction
- Architects: Abugov & Sunderland
- Main contractor: Hashman Construction Ltd.

The CN Tower is an 111-metre-tall (364 ft), 26-storey office building in Edmonton, Alberta, Canada. The building was built by the Canadian National Railway Company as Edmonton's first skyscraper, and at its completion in 1966 was the tallest building in Western Canada. The CN Tower would remain Edmonton's and Western Canada's tallest building until 1971 when it was surpassed by Edmonton House.

== History ==
When the Canadian Northern Railway (CNoR) opened its line from Winnipeg in 1905, it built a station northwest of First Street and Mackenzie Avenue (now 101 Street and 104 Avenue). In 1909 this station became a union station, also serving trains of the Grand Trunk Pacific Railway (GTP) when that road opened its line from Winnipeg.

After the CNoR and GTP were consolidated into the Canadian National Railway (CN), a new Edmonton station was built east of the CNoR station in 1928, as a terminating vista of 100 Street.

The 1905 CNoR station was demolished in 1953. The site of the 1928 station became the spot the CN Tower was constructed on in 1966.

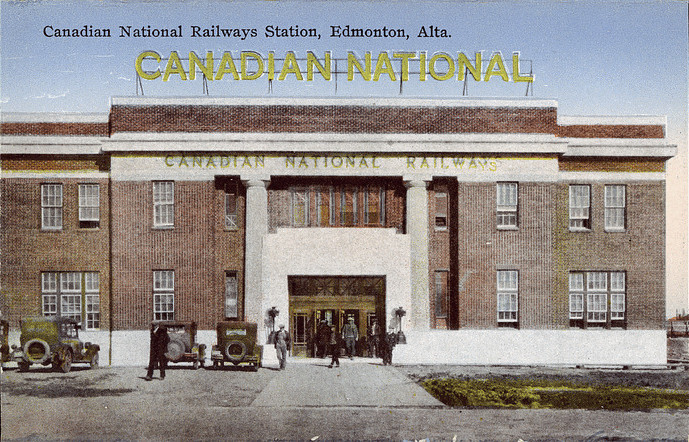
1928 railway station that was demolished to make way for the tower

Plans for the CN Tower were announced in 1963, with construction started on 14 August 1964. Allied Development Corporation of Calgary hired Abugov & Sunderland to design, and Hashman Construction Company to build the $10.5-million CN Tower, which was Western Canada's tallest office building when completed in October 1966. The building officially opened on 4 November 1966 with Lieutenant Governor Grant MacEwan and Premier Ernest Manning in attendance for its opening ceremonies.

The CN Tower exemplifies the International Style of architecture and is an early example of the tower-podium design. Canadian National sought to develop a second building in Edmonton as part of a larger downtown redevelopment program, which would have been a 150.1-metre (492.6 ft), 42-storey office building in 1969; however, the project was subsequently cancelled. The CN Tower was purchased by the Calgary-based Strategic Group as part of a distress sale, and the last remaining CN employees moved out of the building in 2008. The CN logo is still over the main entrance and on the top of the building.

Built to overlook the old Canadian National rail yard, the building's basement once housed Edmonton's main passenger railway station, until the CN railway tracks leading to Downtown Edmonton were removed in 1998. Since then, passenger trains call at the Edmonton railway station on 121 Street near Yellowhead Trail. The Canadian Pacific Railway terminated at a different station in the city. Passenger trains were discontinued at that station in 1972, with the CPR station itself being demolished in 1978.

The building suffered structural damage to the exterior on 18 July 2009, during a severe thunderstorm. Two vehicles were crushed by falling debris at the base of the building.

=== Former railway services ===
As of 1980
Preceding station	Via Rail	Following station
Evansburg toward Vancouver	The Canadian	Viking toward Toronto
Jasper toward Vancouver	Super Continental	Saskatoon toward Toronto
New Sarepta toward Drumheller	Edmonton-Drumheller	Terminus
As of 1943
Preceding station	Canadian National Railway	Following station
Bissell toward Vancouver	Main Line	North Edmonton toward Montreal
Terminus	Edmonton – Alliance	North Edmonton toward Alliance
Terminus	Edmonton – Heinsburg	North Edmonton toward Heinsburg
Terminus	Edmonton – Winnipeg via North Battleford and Regina	North Edmonton toward Winnipeg
Terminus	Edmonton – Athabaska	Cannell toward Athabaska
North Edmonton toward Calgary	Calgary – Edmonton via Mirror	Terminus
North Edmonton toward Calgary	Calgary – Edmonton via Big Valley	Terminus
Cannell toward Whitecourt	Whitecourt – Edmonton	Terminus
Preceding station	Northern Alberta Railways	Following station
Edmonton Junction toward Dawson Creek	Main Line	Terminus
Edmonton Junction toward Barrhead	Barrhead – Edmonton	Terminus
Terminus	Edmonton – Waterways	Edmonton Junction toward Waterways

== See also ==
- List of tallest buildings in Edmonton
- Edmonton station (Canadian Pacific Railway)
- Edmonton station (Via Rail)

Preceded by Garneau Towers	Tallest building in Edmonton; 1966–1971; 110.92 m (363.9 ft)	Succeeded by AGT Tower
