= Jake Middleton =

Canadian ice hockey player (born 1996)

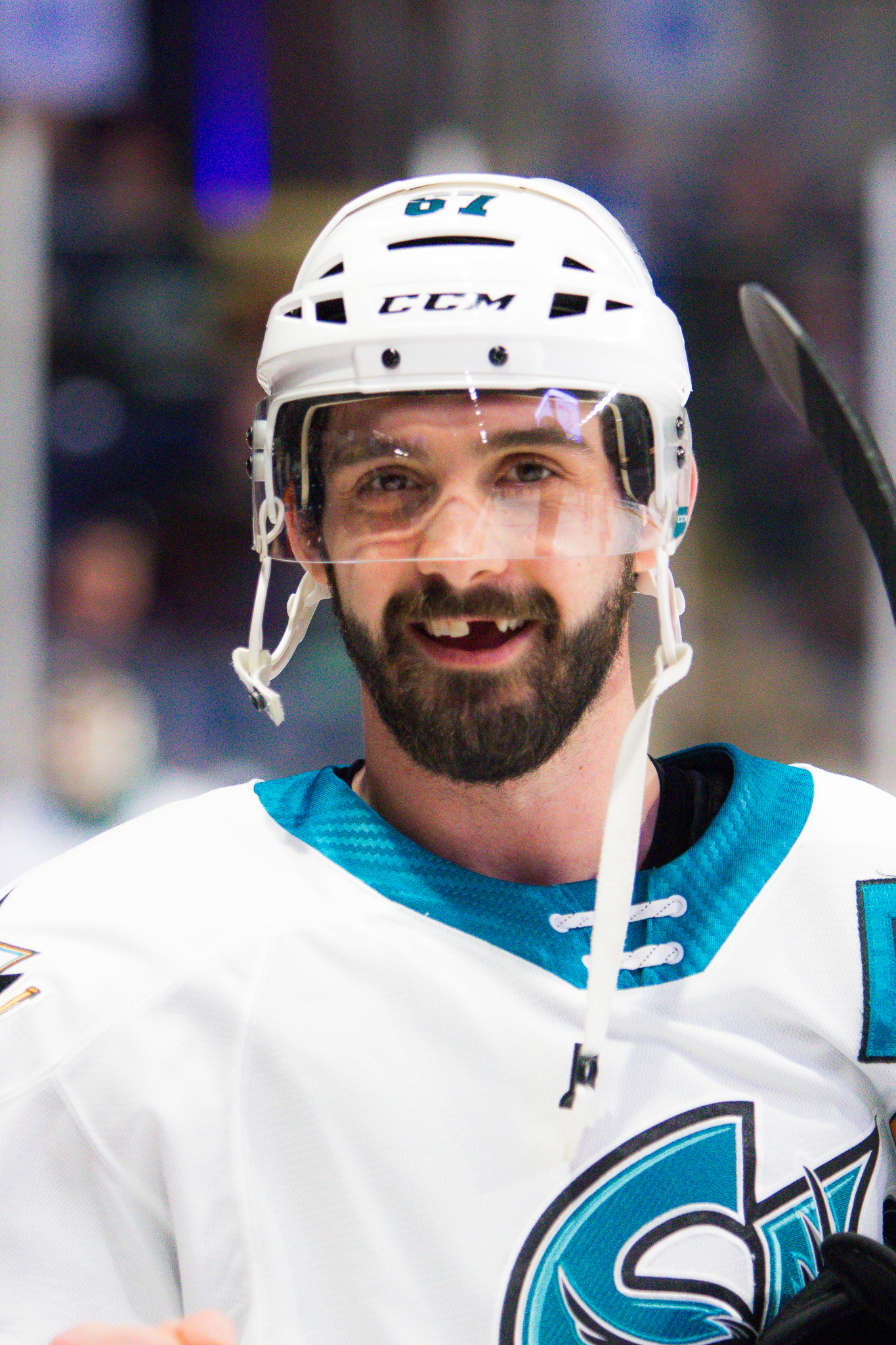
- Middleton with the San Jose Barracuda in 2019
- Born: January 2, 1996 (age 30) Wainwright, Alberta, Canada
- Height: 6 ft 3 in (191 cm)
- Weight: 219 lb (99 kg; 15 st 9 lb)
- Position: Defence
- Shoots: Left
- NHL team Former teams: Calgary Flames; San Jose Sharks; Minnesota Wild
- National team: Canada
- NHL draft: 210th overall, 2014; Los Angeles Kings
- Playing career: 2016–present

Jacob "Jake" Middleton (born January 2, 1996) is a Canadian professional hockey player who is a defenceman for the Calgary Flames of the National Hockey League (NHL). He was originally drafted 210th overall (the last pick in the draft) by the Los Angeles Kings in the 2014 NHL entry draft.

== Playing career ==
After being drafted by the Owen Sound Attack in the 2012 Ontario Hockey League draft, Middleton played 14 games for the team before being traded to the Ottawa 67's on January 7, 2013. On January 8, 2016, in his fourth season with the 67's, Middleton was named captain of the team. After concluding that season, on April 8, 2016, Middleton signed an amateur try-out agreement with the Manchester Monarchs of the ECHL. He played seven games for the Monarchs before joining the American Hockey League (AHL) affiliate of the San Jose Sharks, the San Jose Barracuda, for the 2016–17 season.

On September 7, 2017, Middleton signed a three-year, entry-level contract with the San Jose Sharks. He subsequently played the 2017–18 season with their American Hockey League affiliate, the San Jose Barracuda.

While attending the Sharks' training camp prior to the 2018–19 season, on September 23, 2018, Middleton was reassigned to Barracuda. On January 5, 2019, Middleton was recalled from the Barracuda, and made his NHL debut that night against the Tampa Bay Lightning. He recorded his first point on April 4, 2019, in a 3–2 victory against the Edmonton Oilers. On October 5, 2019, he was placed on injured reserve.

In the 2021–22 season, while remaining on the Sharks roster, Middleton scored his first NHL goal in a 6–3 win against the Ottawa Senators on November 24, 2021. He compiled career best marks of 3 goals and 9 points through 45 games. While in the midst of his first full NHL season he was traded by the Sharks, along with a 2022 fifth-round draft pick to the Minnesota Wild in exchange for Kaapo Kähkönen on March 21, 2022.

As a pending free agent, Middleton opted to remain with the Wild in signing a three-year, $7.35 million extension on July 6, 2022.

On July 2, 2026, Middleton, alongside a 2027 third round pick, a 2028 fourth round pick, and a 2029 second round pick, were traded to the Calgary Flames in exchange for Blake Coleman and Olli Määttä.

== International play ==
Medal record

Representing Canada

Ice hockey

World Championships
Gold medal – first place	2023 Finland/Latvia	

On May 5, 2023, Middleton was named to Canada men's national ice hockey team at the 2023 IIHF World Championship where he recorded five assists in ten games and won a gold medal.

== Personal life ==
Jake was brought up in Stratford, Ontario. Jake formerly played alongside his brother, Keaton Middleton, for the AHL's San Jose Barracuda between 2018 and 2020. Keaton currently plays within the rival Colorado Avalanche organization. Jake was married in 2022 to his wife Natalie who is a nurse in Minneapolis. The two have one daughter named Stevie, born in 2024.

== Career statistics ==
=== Regular season and playoffs ===
			Regular season					Playoffs
Season	Team	League	GP	G	A	Pts	PIM	GP	G	A	Pts	PIM
2011–12	Stratford Cullitons	GOJHL	4	0	3	3	0	—	—	—	—	—
2012–13	Owen Sound Attack	OHL	14	0	1	1	7	—	—	—	—	—
2012–13	Ottawa 67's	OHL	15	1	3	4	18	—	—	—	—	—
2013–14	Ottawa 67's	OHL	65	2	21	23	64	—	—	—	—	—
2014–15	Ottawa 67's	OHL	64	4	23	27	62	6	1	1	2	4
2015–16	Ottawa 67's	OHL	68	7	24	31	68	5	0	2	2	2
2015–16	Manchester Monarchs	ECHL	2	0	1	1	0	5	0	0	0	0
2016–17	San Jose Barracuda	AHL	50	1	8	9	56	13	0	4	4	10
2017–18	San Jose Barracuda	AHL	67	6	22	28	80	4	0	1	1	0
2018–19	San Jose Barracuda	AHL	57	5	14	19	67	4	0	0	0	0
2018–19	San Jose Sharks	NHL	3	0	1	1	2	—	—	—	—	—
2019–20	San Jose Barracuda	AHL	32	1	5	6	52	—	—	—	—	—
2019–20	San Jose Sharks	NHL	10	0	2	2	9	—	—	—	—	—
2020–21	San Jose Sharks	NHL	1	0	0	0	2	—	—	—	—	—
2020–21	San Jose Barracuda	AHL	22	3	4	7	18	4	0	2	2	0
2021–22	San Jose Sharks	NHL	45	3	6	9	69	—	—	—	—	—
2021–22	Minnesota Wild	NHL	21	1	4	5	13	6	0	1	1	2
2022–23	Minnesota Wild	NHL	79	3	12	15	72	6	0	2	2	8
2023–24	Minnesota Wild	NHL	80	7	18	25	77	—	—	—	—	—
2024–25	Minnesota Wild	NHL	67	8	13	21	40	6	0	2	2	2
2025–26	Minnesota Wild	NHL	75	2	14	16	76	11	0	1	1	2
NHL totals			381	24	70	94	360	29	0	6	6	14

=== International ===
Year	Team	Event	Result	GP	G	A	Pts	PIM
2013	Canada Ontario	U17	6th	5	1	1	2	16
2023	Canada	WC	1st place, gold medalist(s)	10	0	5	5	4
Junior totals				5	1	1	2	16
Senior totals				10	0	5	5	4

== Awards and honours ==
Award	Year
OHL
Second All-Rookie Team	2013
AHL
All-Star Game	2019
