= Strathcona Canadian Pacific Railway Station =

Railway station in Alberta, Canada

South Edmonton
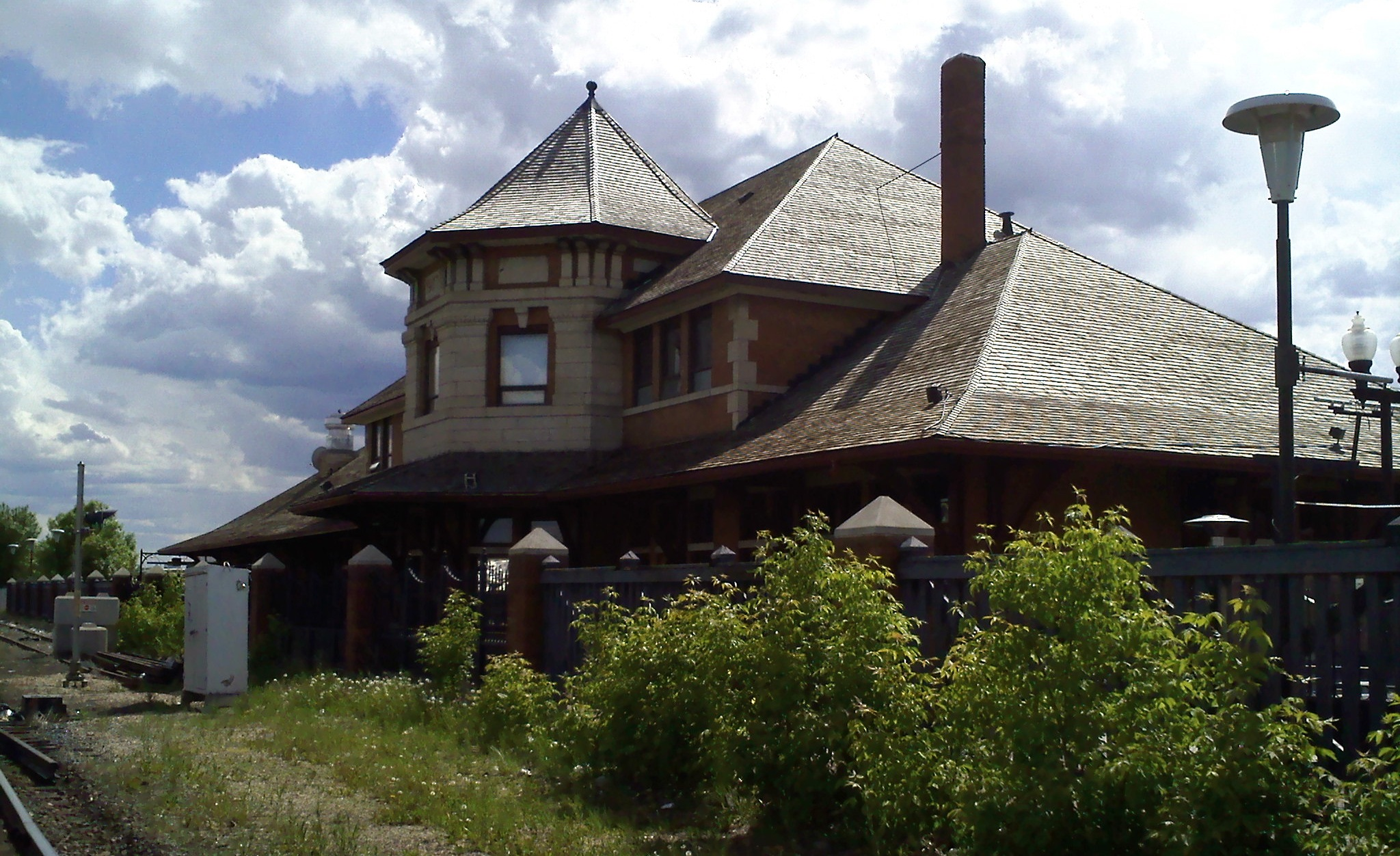
- South Edmonton station in June 2010

General information
- Location: 8101 Gateway Boulevard, Strathcona, Edmonton, Alberta
- Coordinates: 53°31′1″N 113°29′40″W

History
- Opened: 1908
- Closed: 1985
- Former names: Strathcona

Former services
Preceding station	Canadian Pacific Railway	Following station
Edmonton Terminus	Edmonton – Lloydminster	Lambton Park toward Lloydminster
Edmonton Terminus	Edmonton – Portage la Prairie	Wetaskiwin toward Portage la Prairie
Ellerslie toward Macleod	Macleod – Edmonton	Edmonton Terminus
Nisku toward Lacombe	Lacombe – South Edmonton via Rimbey	Terminus

Heritage Railway Station (Canada)
- Official name: Canadian Pacific Railway Station
- Designated: November 22, 1991
Location

South Edmonton station, known as Strathcona station prior to 1932, was built by the Calgary and Edmonton Railway in what was then the City of Strathcona, Alberta.

== History ==
Construction on the station was started on June 4, 1907, and opened on January 21, 1908.

The 1908 station was the second in Strathcona. The original 1891 station was demolished after this bigger station opened; however, a replica houses the Calgary & Edmonton Railway Station Museum at 10447 86 Avenue NW, four blocks north of the 1908 station.

C.P.R. Depot around 1910

The Strathcona station was expanded in 1910.

The building was initially the northern terminus of the Calgary and Edmonton Railway serving Strathcona and Edmonton, although Canadian Pacific later expanded that line north across the North Saskatchewan River via the High Level Bridge into Edmonton proper.

The last passenger service to the station, a Dayliner run by Via Rail, was in 1985.

The building was designated a Canadian Heritage Railway Station in 1991, when it was still owned by CP and therefore subject to federal regulation. After being sold by CP it was designated a Municipal Historic Resource in 2003, and a Provincial Historic Resource in 2004.

From 1998 to 2010 the building was home to the Iron Horse Night Club, one of Edmonton's largest nightclubs, with two levels, eights bars, four rooms, a dance floor, and a stage; it hosted over 1,000 people on an average night. In 2012, MKT took over the building to operate as a beer and food venue.
