= Edmonton station (Canadian Pacific Railway) =

Coordinates: 53.542°N 113.509°W

Edmonton was the terminal station for passenger services along the Canadian Pacific Railway's subdivisions from Calgary to Edmonton shortly after the completion of the High Level Bridge, with services commencing on September 2, 1913. Passenger services across the North Saskatchewan River were discontinued in 1972, and the station building itself was demolished in 1978.

== CPR's arrival in Edmonton ==
The initial construction of the Calgary and Edmonton Railway in 1891 was limited by the North Saskatchewan River with services reaching no further than Strathcona. This contributed to a competitive disadvantage when the Canadian Northern Railway arrived in Edmonton in 1905. The High-Level Bridge was constructed to complete the railway to Edmonton proper and squash this disadvantage. When it was completed in 1913, CPR (who had acquired the C&E) constructed a new station north of the river, on the northwest corner of Jasper Avenue and 109 Street. The two-storey station contained the usual amenities such as a ticketing office and waiting room, as well a special immigrants' waiting room in the basement. The station became a hub for passenger traffic and counterpoint to the CNoR (later Canadian National Railway) station located at 104 Avenue and 101 Street.

== Demise ==
Following the CPR's withdrawal of passenger services to downtown Edmonton in 1972, the station building was demolished in 1978 despite an effort to save it. Edmonton is still served by passenger trains, with Via Rail's Canadian stopping at its station since 1998, when the CN Tower station was closed and the CN yard in downtown Edmonton was removed.

Preceding station	Canadian Pacific Railway	Following station
Terminus	Edmonton – Lloydminster	South Edmonton toward Lloydminster
Terminus	Edmonton – Portage la Prairie	South Edmonton toward Portage la Prairie
South Edmonton toward Macleod	Macleod – Edmonton	Terminus
