= Measures Against Marxism's Dangerous Adherents and Noxious Islamists Act =

2026 United States immigration bill

Measures Against Marxism's Dangerous Adherents and Noxious Islamists Act of 2026
- Long title: To amend the Immigration and Nationality Act to limit alien eligibility for admission and naturalization and enable deportation and denaturalization for any membership, affiliation, or advocacy of socialist, communist, Chinese communist, Marxist, or Islamic fundamentalist doctrines, and for other purposes.
- Acronyms (colloquial): MAMDANI Act

Legislative history
- Introduced in the House as H.R. 8387 by Chip Roy (R–TX) on April 20, 2026; Committee consideration by House Judiciary Committee

The Measures Against Marxism's Dangerous Adherents and Noxious Islamists Act of 2026, abbreviated the MAMDANI Act, is a proposed United States federal immigration law introduced by Republican representative Chip Roy of Texas on April 20, 2026. Designated H.R. 8387 in the 119th United States Congress, the bill would amend the Immigration and Nationality Act (INA) to expand ideological grounds for inadmissibility, deportation, and restrictions on naturalization. It would also amend an existing evidentiary provision concerning the revocation of naturalization.

The legislation would cover specified forms of advocacy, membership, and affiliation involving socialism, communism, what it defines as "Chinese communism", Marxism, and "Islamic fundamentalism". It expressly names organizations including the Democratic Socialists of America (DSA), Socialist Party USA, Communist Party USA, Chinese Communist Party, Muslim Brotherhood, Hamas, and Hezbollah.

The bill's acronym is a reference to Zohran Mamdani, the Mayor of New York City. Mamdani, who was born in Uganda and became a naturalized U.S. citizen in 2018, is a Muslim, a democratic socialist, and a member of the DSA.

As of September 2026, the bill remained before the House Judiciary Committee and had not advanced beyond its referral to the committee.

== Background ==
=== Existing immigration law ===
Federal immigration law already contains some restrictions involving communist and totalitarian political organizations. Section 212(a)(3)(D) of the INA generally makes an immigrant inadmissible if the person is or has been a member of or affiliated with the Communist Party or another totalitarian party.

Current law includes exceptions for membership or affiliation that was involuntary, occurred solely before the age of 16, resulted from operation of law, or was necessary to obtain employment, food rations, or other essentials of living. It also provides an exception for certain former members after two or five years, depending on the circumstances, and permits discretionary waivers for some close relatives of U.S. citizens and lawful permanent residents.

Separate provisions govern naturalization. Section 313 of the INA restricts naturalization in circumstances involving advocacy of, membership in, or affiliation with communist or other totalitarian organizations and doctrines. Under current law, the relevant period generally extends from ten years before a naturalization application until the applicant takes the oath of citizenship.

Fortune noted that some of the concepts in Roy's proposal therefore have precedents in existing U.S. immigration law, while the bill would extend those restrictions to additional ideologies and organizations.

=== Naming and connection to Mamdani ===
Roy introduced H.R. 8387 several months after Mamdani became mayor of New York City. Mamdani was sworn into office on January 1, 2026, becoming the city's first Muslim mayor, first mayor of South Asian descent, and first mayor born in Africa.

The proposed definition of a "socialist party" specifically includes the Democratic Socialists of America. Mamdani is a DSA member, although he has said that he campaigns on his own platform and does not necessarily endorse every position of the organization.

In announcing the bill, Roy said that U.S. immigration policy had allowed the spread of political movements he considered hostile to American institutions. He described the proposal as targeting what he called a "Red-Green Alliance" of Marxist and Islamist movements.

H.R. 8387 was at least the third bill introduced during the 119th Congress with a title producing the acronym "MAMDANI". In July 2025, Representative Mike Lawler introduced the Measuring Adverse Market Disruption And National Impact Act (H.R. 4692), which would direct the Federal Trade Commission to study government-owned grocery stores. Publicly owned grocery stores had been a proposal in Mamdani's 2025 mayoral campaign.

In November 2025, Representative Buddy Carter introduced the Moving American Money Distant from Anti-National Interests Act (H.R. 5937), which proposed rescinding certain unobligated federal funds for New York City while Mamdani served as mayor.

== Provisions ==
H.R. 8387 contains two sections. Section 1 provides the short title, while section 2 would amend sections 101, 212, 237, 313, and 340 of the Immigration and Nationality Act.

=== Inadmissibility ===
The bill would amend section 212(a)(3)(D), which presently applies to an "immigrant" who is or has been a member of or affiliated with a communist or other totalitarian party. H.R. 8387 would replace the word "immigrant" with "alien" and expressly add a "Chinese communist party", communist party, socialist party, and "Islamic fundamentalist party" to the provision.

It would create an additional ground of inadmissibility for a non-citizen who advocates or previously advocated socialism, communism, Chinese communism, Marxism, or Islamic fundamentalism, or who is or was affiliated with an organization advocating those doctrines.

The bill would remove the existing exceptions for involuntary membership, membership imposed by law, and membership undertaken to obtain employment, food, or other necessities. It would reduce the childhood exception from conduct occurring before age 16 to conduct occurring before age 14.

It would also eliminate the current exceptions for some former party members and the discretionary waiver for certain close relatives of U.S. citizens and lawful permanent residents.

=== Deportation ===
H.R. 8387 would add a new section 237(a)(4)(G) establishing additional ideological grounds of deportability.

The proposal would make a non-citizen deportable for past, present, or post-admission advocacy of communism, Chinese communism, socialism, Marxism, or Islamic fundamentalism. It would also cover writing, distributing, circulating, printing, displaying, possessing, or publishing written, electronic, or printed material advocating those ideologies or certain parties.

The provision would additionally apply to past, present, or future membership in or affiliation with a specified party, or with an organization advocating one of the covered ideologies, including organizations described as predecessors, successors, or fronts.

The bill states that a person satisfying these grounds "is deportable and shall be removed from the United States".

=== Naturalization ===
The legislation would amend section 313 of the INA to expressly include socialism, communism, Chinese communism, Marxism, and Islamic fundamentalism in several provisions governing naturalization. It would also expand references to written and printed material to include electronic material and make certain past as well as present advocacy, membership, and affiliation relevant.

The statutory period used for the covered activity would be increased from 10 years before the naturalization application to 20 years.

As with the proposed inadmissibility changes, H.R. 8387 would remove language concerning involuntary membership, membership resulting from operation of law, and membership undertaken to obtain employment, food, or other necessities. It would reduce the childhood exception from age 16 to age 14.

The proposal would also repeal an existing provision that can permit naturalization in certain cases involving people admitted in the public interest who later made contributions to U.S. national security, intelligence, or security interests.

=== Revocation of naturalization ===
H.R. 8387 would amend section 340(c) of the INA, which establishes an evidentiary rule used in some proceedings to revoke naturalization.

Under existing law, when a person who was naturalized after December 24, 1952, becomes a member of or affiliated with certain organizations within five years of naturalization, that membership or affiliation can constitute prima facie evidence that the person was not attached to the principles of the Constitution at the time of naturalization.

The bill would delete the five-year limitation from that provision. It would also remove the phrase "in the absence of countervailing evidence".

The amendment would therefore extend the statutory evidentiary presumption to covered membership or affiliation occurring more than five years after naturalization. The provision would not automatically revoke citizenship when a person joined or affiliated with an organization; revocation of naturalization would continue to occur through proceedings under section 340 of the INA.

=== Definitions ===
The legislation would add eleven definitions to section 101(a) of the INA, covering "socialism", "communism", "Chinese communism", "Marxism", "Islamic fundamentalism", four categories of political or ideological parties, "Sharia law", and "militant jihad".

The proposed definition of "socialism" includes movements seeking to restructure economic and social relations to reduce class distinctions, establish government, worker, or collective control or influence over substantially all means of production or asset classes, or institute doctrines associated with Karl Marx, Friedrich Engels, or socialist political leaders.

The definition of a "socialist party" expressly includes the Socialist Party USA and the Democratic Socialists of America, along with their subdivisions, affiliates, predecessors, successors, and organizations described by the bill as socialist fronts.

The proposed definition of "communism" covers, among other things, movements seeking a classless, moneyless, or stateless society or collective control over substantially all aspects of political and economic life. The definition of a "communist party" includes the Communist Party USA, foreign communist parties, their predecessors and successors, and organizations described as communist fronts.

"Chinese communism" is separately defined. The bill's definition of a "Chinese communist party" includes the Chinese Communist Party, the eight other legally recognized political parties in the People's Republic of China, the United Front Work Department, and specified related organizations.

The proposed definition of "Marxism" includes several ideas associated with Marxist theory, including class struggle and distribution according to ability and need. It also includes advocacy of an atheistic society or government prohibitions on private religious practices.

The bill defines "Islamic fundamentalism" to include movements seeking an Islamic society or enforcement of Islamic values through political, legal, religious, military, social, cultural, or academic power. Its definition of an "Islamic fundamentalist party" expressly names the Muslim Brotherhood, Islamic State, Al-Nour Party, Hamas, Hezbollah, Hizb ut-Tahrir, Boko Haram, and al-Shabaab, along with several broader categories of organizations.

The legislation separately defines "Sharia law" and "militant jihad".

=== Judicial review, regulations and severability ===
H.R. 8387 would insert provisions stating that determinations under its amended inadmissibility, deportability, and naturalization provisions would be final and "shall not be subject to review by any court".

The bill would direct the attorney general to issue regulations needed to carry out its amendments. It also contains a severability clause stating that if one provision or application of the legislation were held invalid, the remainder would not automatically be invalidated.

== Legislative history ==
Roy introduced H.R. 8387 in the House of Representatives on April 20, 2026. It was referred to the House Judiciary Committee.

The seven original cosponsors were Republican representatives Barry Moore, Keith Self, Andy Ogles, Randy Fine, Josh Brecheen, Mary Miller, and Brandon Gill. Republican representatives Diana Harshbarger and Ralph Norman subsequently joined as cosponsors, bringing the total to nine.

As of September 8, 2026, the congressional record listed no legislative action after the referral to the Judiciary Committee.

== Reception ==
=== Support ===
Roy described the proposal as a response to Marxist and Islamist political movements that he argued were hostile to American political institutions. In announcing the bill, he said it was intended to counter what he called the "Red-Green Alliance".

Republican representative Keith Self, an original cosponsor, said the measure was a step toward changing the immigration system and argued that people who rejected American political and cultural values should not be admitted to the country.

The Immigration Accountability Project also supported the bill. Grant Newman, the group's director of government relations, said that admission to the United States was a privilege and argued that the government should be able to exclude non-citizens who sought to undermine the Constitution or American political system.

=== Criticism ===
Coverage and criticism of the bill focused on its use of political advocacy and association as immigration criteria, its application to naturalized citizens, and its proposed restrictions on judicial review.

Alex Woodward of The Independent reported that the legislation would substantially expand the role of political ideology in decisions involving admission, deportation, naturalization, and proceedings that could lead to denaturalization. The report also noted that the bill expressly names the Democratic Socialists of America, whose members include Mamdani and other elected officials.

Ed Kilgore, writing for New York magazine's Intelligencer, described the proposal as nativist and argued that its treatment of political advocacy and association raised constitutional concerns.

Fortune discussed the proposal in the context of earlier U.S. anti-communist immigration policies and the Second Red Scare, while noting that current federal immigration law already contains restrictions based on membership in communist or other totalitarian parties.

== See also ==
- Denaturalization
- Immigration and Nationality Act of 1952
- Immigration Act of 1990
- Ideological restrictions on naturalization in U.S. law
- Internal Security Act of 1950
- Communist Control Act of 1954
- Second Red Scare
