= Kim Dorland =

Canadian painter (born 1974)

- Born: 1974 (age 51–52); Wainwright, Alberta, Canada
- Education: Emily Carr Institute of Art and Design; York University
- Known for: landscape painter who uses thick medium, fluorescent paint
- Spouse: Lori Seymour

Kim Dorland (born 1974) is a contemporary Canadian painter based in Toronto. He is best known for his thickly painted, fluorescent landscapes, super-thick portraiture, and his use of multiple painting mediums per canvas.

== Life and career ==
Dorland was born in Wainwright, Alberta and grew up in Red Deer, Alberta. He received his B.F.A from Emily Carr Institute of Art and Design in 1998 and completed his Master's of Fine Art at York University in 2003.

Dorland first gained attention with his paintings of suburbia which drew heavily on nostalgia from his days as a teen growing up in Red Deer, Alberta, Canada. These paintings of bush parties, fist fights and wooded areas on the edges of suburbia were characterized by fluorescent under-paintings and thick passages of impasto. Dorland became known for the thickness of his paint, particularly in his dense portraits (primarily of his wife, Lori) where the paint is piled on so thick in places that he often had to use screws to secure it. He is also known for using multiple materials (traditional and non-traditional) on one surface, including oil paint, acrylic paint, spray paint, ink, phosphorescence, inkjet printing, screws, fur and paper.

Dorland has cited Canada's Group of Seven and, specifically, Tom Thomson, as early influences. After his suburban paintings, his next body of work focused primarily on landscapes, bringing the tradition of Canadian landscape painting, popularized by the Group of Seven, into a contemporary context. Dorland's landscapes from this time depict forests with traces of human contact including graffiti and litter. In 2013, Dorland exhibited his work at the McMichael Canadian Art Collection in Kleinburg, alongside paintings by artists from the Group of Seven. That same year he was named The Globe and Mail's Artist of the Year. Dorland's most recent work has focused on themes of the psychology and vulnerability of landscapes and the environment.

== Exhibitions ==
Dorland's work has been exhibited at galleries and museums in Toronto, Montreal, New York, Los Angeles, London, Milan, Vancouver and Denver including the Museum of Contemporary Art Denver (solo), the McMichael Canadian Art Collection (solo), the Montreal Museum of Fine Arts and the Vancouver Art Gallery.

== Selected collections ==
- Takashi Murakami
- Audain Art Museum, Whistler, Canada
- Contemporary Art Foundation, Tokyo, Japan
- Art Gallery of Alberta, Edmonton, Canada
- Richard Prince
- Musée d’art contemporain de Montréal, Montréal, Canada
- Museum of Contemporary Art San Diego, San Diego, CA
- Blanton Museum of Art at the University of Texas, Austin TX
- The Glenbow Museum, Calgary, Canada
- The Montréal Museum of Fine Arts, Montréal, Canada
- Nerman Museum of Contemporary Art, Kansas City, USA
