= Wainwright High School =

High school in Alberta, Canada

Coordinates: 52.8421°N 110.86489°W

- Wainwright, Alberta; Canada

Information
- School type: High school
- Website: whs.btps.ca

Wainwright High School (also known as WHS) is a public high school for grades 7–12 in Wainwright, Alberta, Canada. It is located next to Highway 14 and is a part of the Buffalo Trail Public Schools Regional Division No. 28.

The school holds a capacity of about five hundred, and has a variety of programs for its students. It offers an extensive Careers and Technology Studies curriculum with Industrial Arts and two main computer labs. In addition, it is involved in the fine arts, with music and art programs.

The school offers athletic programs such as basketball, volleyball, football, badminton, track and field, curling, and golf.

Wainwright High was one of the host schools for the 2005 Canadian Student Leadership Conference. It was a joint effort with Lloydminster Comprehensive and Holy Rosary high schools.

In 2009, WHS received a large amount of money to finish previous renovations.
