= Portage la Prairie station (Canadian Pacific Railway) =

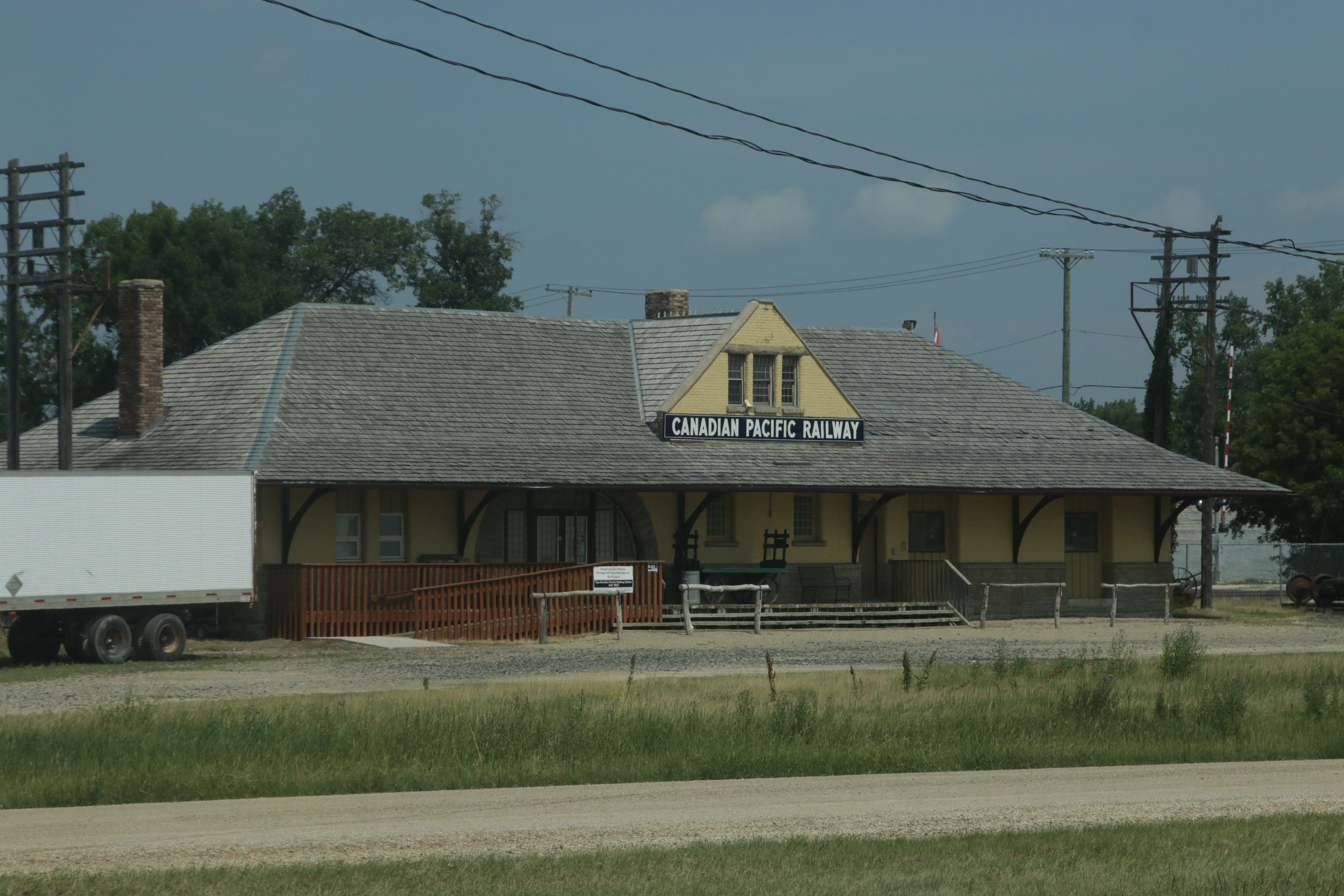
- Portage la Prairie CPR station in 2019
- Interactive map of the Portage la Prairie station area

General information
- Location: 301 Pacific Avenue; Portage la Prairie, Manitoba, Portage la Prairie, MB, Canada
- Coordinates: 49°58′41″N 98°17′9.5″W
- Completed: 1893
- Client: Canadian Pacific Railway

Design and construction
- Architect: Edward Colonna

Portage la Prairie station is a former Canadian Pacific Railway station that is being restored as a museum. Passenger rail service in the community is now provided at the Portage la Prairie railway station by Via Rail.

This station was designated a historic site in 1992.

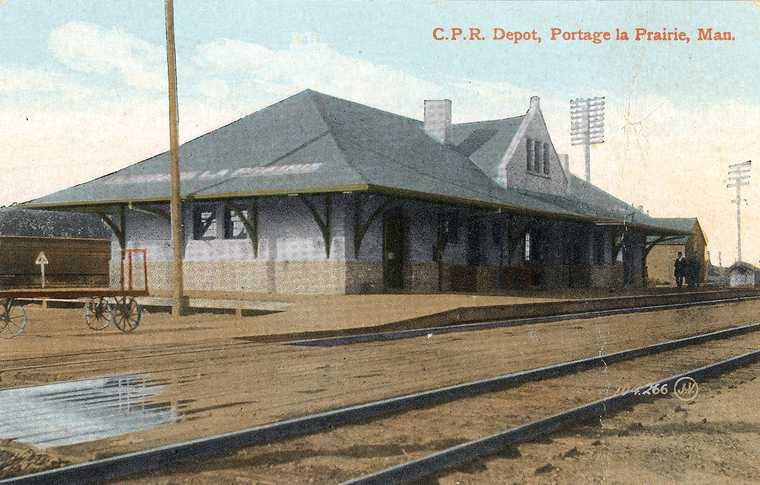
Portage la Prairie Station as it appeared between 1900 and 1909

== Footnotes ==
Preceding station	Canadian Pacific Railway	Following station
Burnside toward Vancouver	Main Line	High Bluff toward Montreal Windsor
Gladstone toward Edmonton	Edmonton – Portage la Prairie	Terminus
Genest toward Inglis	Inglis – Portage la Prairie local stops	Terminus
