= Barry Moore =

Barry Moore may refer to:

- Barry Moore (baseball) (born 1943), American baseball player
- Barry Moore (Canadian politician) (born 1944), Canadian member of parliament
- Barry Moore (American politician) (born 1966), U.S. representative from Alabama
- Barry Moore (American football) (1948–2008), American football player

== See also ==
- Barrie Moore (born 1975), Canadian ice hockey player
- Luka Bloom (Kevin Barry Moore, born 1955), Irish folk rock singer-songwriter
