= Keaton Middleton =

Canadian ice hockey player (born 1998)

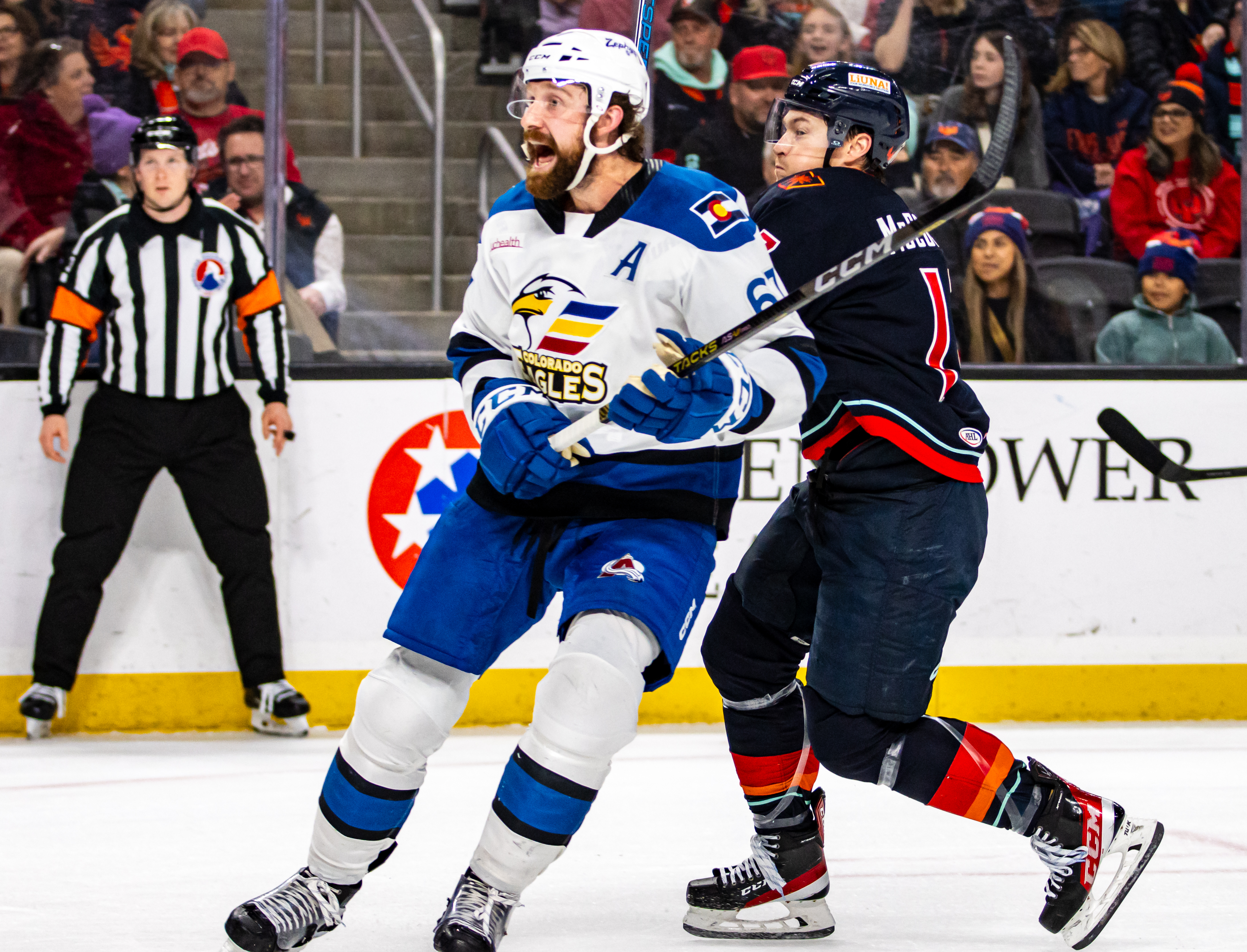
- Born: February 10, 1998 (age 28) Edmonton, Alberta, Canada
- Height: 6 ft 6 in (198 cm)
- Weight: 240 lb (109 kg; 17 st 2 lb)
- Position: Defence
- Shoots: Left
- NHL team (P) Cur. team: Colorado Avalanche; Colorado Eagles (AHL)
- NHL draft: 101st overall, 2016; Toronto Maple Leafs
- Playing career: 2018–present

Keaton Middleton (born February 10, 1998) is a Canadian professional ice hockey defenceman for the Colorado Eagles of the American Hockey League (AHL) while under contract to the Colorado Avalanche of the National Hockey League (NHL).

== Playing career ==
=== Junior ===
Middleton played minor midget hockey with the Huron Perth Lakers of the ALLIANCE U16 league and the Stratford Cullitons of the Greater Ontario Junior Hockey League (GOJHL) before he was selected 50th overall in the 2014 OHL Priority Draft by the Saginaw Spirit.

Agreeing to terms with the Spirit on April 26, 2014, Middleton began his major junior career in the 2014–15 season, posting 9 points through 61 regular season games. Following a second season developing as a physical presence on the blueline with the Spirit, Middleton was selected by the Toronto Maple Leafs in the fourth-round, 101st overall, of the 2016 NHL entry draft.

While with the Spirit in the OHL, Middleton was selected as team captain in his last two seasons of major junior hockey, increasing his offensive contributions while continuing show a physical edge. In his final junior season in the 2017–18 season, Middleton established career bests of 20 assists and 24 points to help Saginaw return to the playoffs.

=== Professional ===
With the Maple Leafs declining to offer Middleton a contract, Middleton attended the San Jose Sharks Development camp before embarking on his professional career by agreeing to a one-year AHL contract with affiliate, the San Jose Barracuda, on September 19, 2018. In joining older brother Jacob, on the Barracuda blueline, Middleton made his professional debut against the Ontario Reign on October 5, to open the 2018–19 season and later registered his first goal in a 6–1 victory over the Texas Stars on October 27. As a fixture on the Barracuda blueline, Middleton made 61 regular season appearances, adding 6 goals and 7 assists for 13 points.

Middleton attended the San Jose Sharks 2019 training camp before he was returned to the Barracuda for the 2019–20 season on September 24, 2019. Limited to 41 regular season games, Middleton matched his previous season totals with 13 points, before the season was suspended and later cancelled due to the COVID-19 pandemic.

Middleton left the Barracuda as a free agent and was signed to a one-year AHL contract with the Colorado Eagles, on July 8, 2020. In the pandemic delayed 2020–21 season, Middleton made 14 appearances with the Eagles, adding size and a physical acumen to the blueline, before he was signed to his first NHL contract in agreeing to a two-year, two-way contract with affiliate, the Colorado Avalanche on March 30, 2021. With the Avalanche suffering a rash of injuries, Middleton was recalled and made his NHL debut, featuring in a third-pairing role during a 2–0 victory over the Anaheim Ducks on April 9, 2021. He was scoreless in 3 appearances with the Avalanche before he was returned to the Eagles for the remainder of the season.

In the following 2021–22 season, Middleton competed in 49 games primarily for the Eagles, recording 2 goals and 11 points. He made 9 Calder Cup Playoff outings, tallying 4 points. As a restricted free agent following the season, Middleton was tendered a qualifying offer and later re-signed to a one-year, two-way contract with the Avalanche on July 21, 2022.

During the 2022–23 season, in the midst of a breakout season offensively in his third year with the Eagles, Middleton was re-signed to a two-year, two-way contract extension with the Avalanche on February 25, 2023.

During the 2024–25 season, Middleton saw a significant increase in NHL playing time, appearing in half (41) of the Avalanche's games that year, after playing a total of 3 career games prior (all 4 seasons ago). Middleton played in a shut-down role on the third-pair, stepping in often due to the Avalanche suffering a number of significant injuries to regular lineup players during the season. In the middle of the campaign, Middleton was re-signed by the team to another two-year contract worth $775,000 annually on January 2, 2025. Although Colorado qualified for the playoffs, he did not appear in any games for the team.

== Personal ==
He is the younger brother of Jacob Middleton, who currently plays defence for the Calgary Flames in the NHL.

== Career statistics ==
=== Regular season and playoffs ===
			Regular season					Playoffs
Season	Team	League	GP	G	A	Pts	PIM	GP	G	A	Pts	PIM
2013–14	Stratford Cullitons	GOJHL	22	4	16	22	24	4	0	0	0	0
2014–15	Saginaw Spirit	OHL	61	2	7	9	58	4	0	1	1	0
2015–16	Saginaw Spirit	OHL	66	1	6	7	66	4	0	1	1	0
2016–17	Saginaw Spirit	OHL	64	4	14	18	48	—	—	—	—	—
2017–18	Saginaw Spirit	OHL	64	4	20	24	45	4	0	0	0	2
2018–19	San Jose Barracuda	AHL	61	6	7	13	64	4	0	0	0	0
2019–20	San Jose Barracuda	AHL	41	4	9	13	49	—	—	—	—	—
2020–21	Colorado Eagles	AHL	22	0	6	6	42	2	2	2	4	0
2020–21	Colorado Avalanche	NHL	3	0	0	0	4	—	—	—	—	—
2021–22	Colorado Eagles	AHL	49	2	9	11	76	9	1	3	4	16
2022–23	Colorado Eagles	AHL	72	3	20	23	125	7	1	1	2	6
2023–24	Colorado Eagles	AHL	71	6	9	15	136	3	0	0	0	2
2024–25	Colorado Eagles	AHL	17	0	4	4	11	—	—	—	—	—
2024–25	Colorado Avalanche	NHL	41	0	2	2	28	—	—	—	—	—
2025–26	Colorado Eagles	AHL	66	4	10	14	63	17	1	5	6	10
2025–26	Colorado Avalanche	NHL	3	0	1	1	4	—	—	—	—	—
NHL totals			47	0	3	3	36	—	—	—	—	—

=== International ===
Year	Team	Event	Result	GP	G	A	Pts	PIM
2014	Canada White	U17	5th	5	0	1	1	2
Junior totals				5	0	1	1	2

== Awards and honours ==
Award	Year
OHL
Second All-Rookie Team	2015
