= Muhammad Mamdani =

Canadian scientist

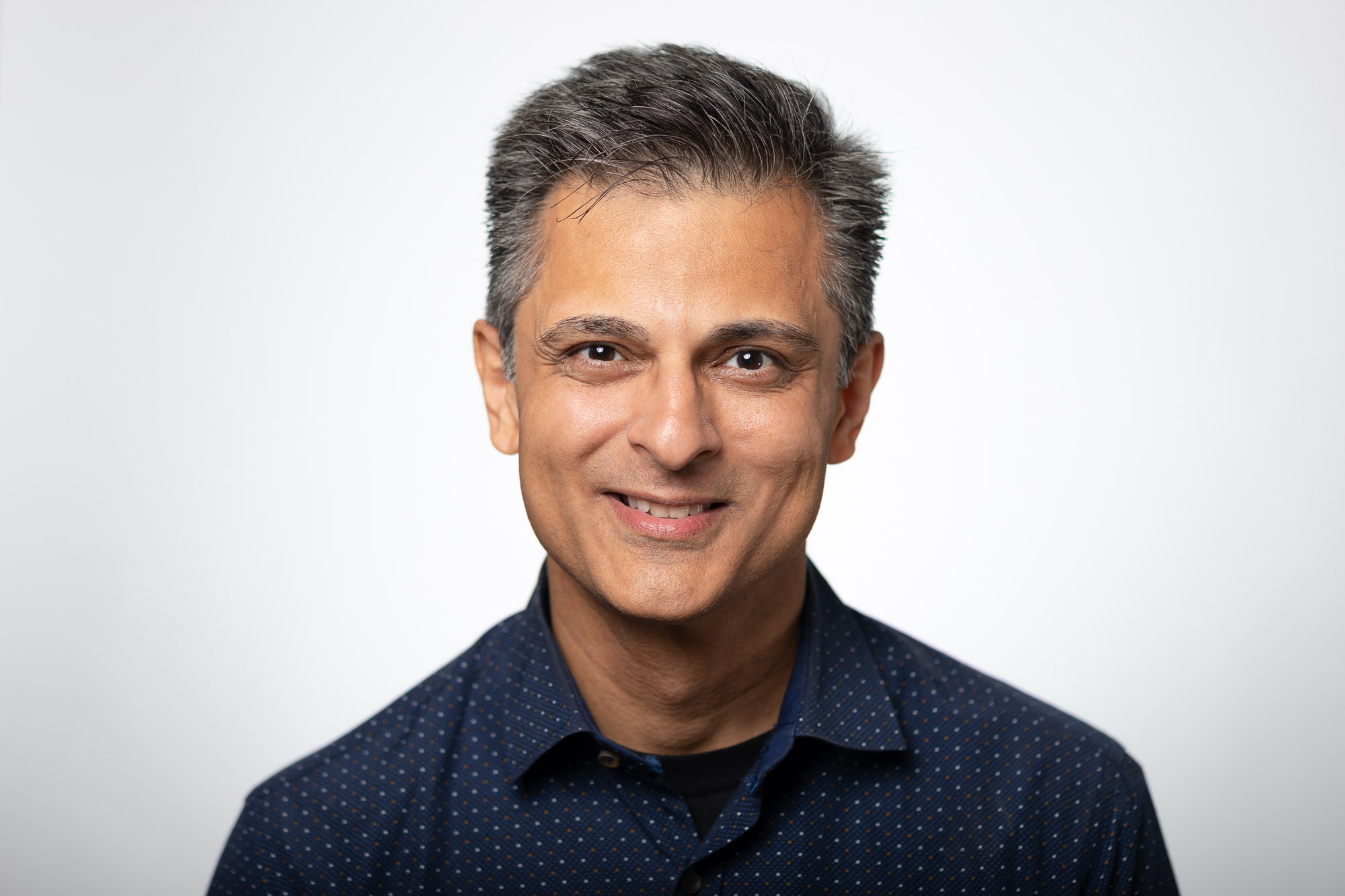
- Education: Wayne State University; University of Michigan; Harvard University
- Known for: drug safety; artificial intelligence
- Scientific career
- Fields: Medicine; Epidemiology
- Workplaces: University of Toronto; Unity Health Toronto

Muhammad Mamdani is a Canadian professor, pharmacist and epidemiologist, known for contributions to pharmacoeconomics, drug safety and the application of data analytics and artificial intelligence to medical systems.

== Biography ==
Mamdani is a professor in the Leslie Dan Faculty of Pharmacy and Temerty Faculty of Medicine at the University of Toronto.

He completed a master of arts degree at Wayne State University, followed by a PharmD at University of Michigan and a master of public health degree at Harvard University.

He is the Vice-President of Data Science and Advanced Analytics at Unity Health Toronto, and the founder and Director of the Temerty Centre for Artificial Intelligence Research and Education in Medicine (T-CAIREM).

He also is the Director and founder of the Li Ka Shing Centre for Healthcare Analytics Research and Training (LKS-CHART), a healthcare data analytics program based at Unity Health Toronto.

He founded the Ontario Drug Policy Research Network (ODPRN), a collaboration between policymakers and investigators in Ontario that serves to inform the province and the country on policy that affects system efficiency, quality of care and health outcomes. He also founded the Applied Health Research Centre, an academic research organization in Ontario, which has managed over 100 multi-site clinical studies since its inception in 2012. He has published over 500 peer-reviewed manuscripts in his career (over 40,000 citations), including in the areas of drug safety, pharmacoeconomics, and application of machine learning to clinical and policy problems.
