= Viking station =

Railway station in Alberta, Canada

Viking
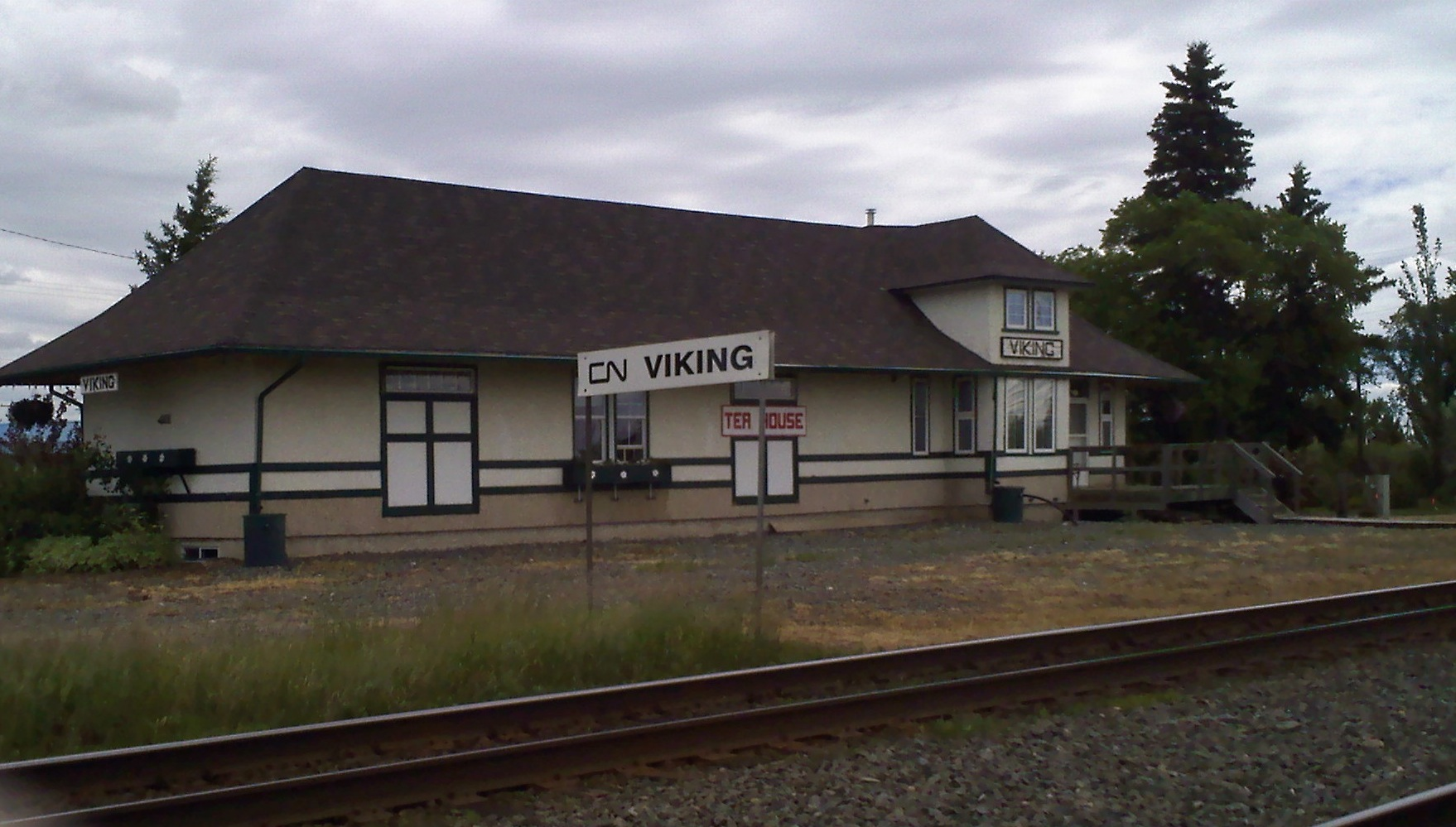

General information
- Location: 5001 51 Avenue, Viking, Alberta; Canada
- Coordinates: 53.0926°N 111.7793°W
- Platforms: 1 side platform
- Tracks: 2

Construction
- Structure type: Sign post
- Parking: short term

Services
Preceding station	Via Rail	Following station
Edmonton toward Vancouver	The Canadian	Wainwright toward Toronto

Former services
Preceding station	Canadian National Railway	Following station
Torlea toward Vancouver	Main Line	Philips toward Montreal
Location

Viking station is on the Canadian National Railway (CN) mainline in Viking, Alberta. The station is served by Via Rail's The Canadian as a flag stop (48 hours advance notice required).

The old CN station building has been restored and now operates as a tea room, tourist information centre and art gallery, featuring original work from local artists.
