= Calgary and Edmonton Railway =

Early pioneer railway in Canada

The Calgary and Edmonton Railway (C&E) was an early pioneer railway in what was then the Northwest Territories, now Alberta, Canada. It was laid out from the town of Calgary to a location near Edmonton, at the site of the future town and city of Strathcona (also called South Edmonton). Construction started in April 1890 and was finished in August 1891. The line was the first major transportation connection even close to the isolated Edmonton settlement. The development of the line created many railway towns along the line such as Red Deer and Wetaskiwin. It was built along the route of the Calgary and Edmonton Trail, which it supplanted as the busiest transportation route along the Calgary–Edmonton Corridor.

Initially, the northern terminus of the line was at the edge of the river valley opposite the Edmonton settlement. A train station was built along Whyte Avenue, a replica of which the Calgary and Edmonton Railway Station Museum operates. A different railway line, the Edmonton, Yukon and Pacific Railway company, later ran a short line across the Low Level Bridge and across the North Saskatchewan River in 1902, later extended to 124th Street and to downtown Edmonton. In 1907 a second Strathcona Canadian Pacific Railway station became the depot for Strathcona. From 1998 to 2010 the former station housed the Iron Horse Night Club.

The line's primary raison d'être was to move in settlers from eastern ports of entry and Central Canada, via Calgary, to Edmonton where they would stay briefly at immigration halls and do business at land titles offices and other businesses, before setting out into the rural areas to start farms and homesteads. Some limited export of grain happened from farms near the line, but the real grain boom in the area required the construction of many more branch lines dotted with grain elevators.

The line was later acquired by the Canadian Pacific Railway, and the CPR built an attached line through Strathcona and across the High Level Bridge. Seasonably, the Edmonton Radial Railway Society operates vintage streetcars from Old Strathcona across the High Level Bridge to stops south of Jasper Avenue and near the Legislature, using the old railway line. Strathcona merged with Edmonton in 1912.

The C&E Railway line itself still exists and is used to carry freight. Train passenger service was discontinued in 1985.

== See also ==
- Calgary and Edmonton Trail
