= Amos Mubunga Kambere =

Ugandan – Canadian author and politician

Member of the Parliament of Uganda
- In office 1980–1985
- Constituency: Kasese South

Personal details
- Born: 1954 (age 71–72) Kyarumba, Kasese District, Uganda
- Citizenship: Ugandan–Canadian
- Party: Uganda People's Congress
- Education: Kyambogo University College
- Occupation: Author, educationist, politician
- Known for: Youngest Member of Parliament of Uganda

Amos Mubunga Kambere (born 1954) is a Ugandan–Canadian author, teacher, and former lawmaker in the Parliament of Uganda. In 1980, Amos Mubunga Kambere became the youngest Member of Parliament of Uganda at the age of twenty-six representing Kasese South.

He is an author and has written a book titled Celebrating Literacy in the Rwenzori Region: Lest We Forget: A Biographical Narrative of Uganda's Youngest Member of Parliament, 1980–1985. The book has a second edition on Amazon.

== Biography ==
Born in 1954 in Kyarumba, Kasese District in western Uganda, Amos Mubunga Kambere grew up on the slopes of the Rwenzori. He attended Kyarumba Primary School before joining high school in Uganda's capital, Kampala. He later studied Economics and Education at Kyambogo University College.

In 1978, Amos traveled to Kabale, a district in the South Western part of Uganda where he taught at Kigezi High School as head of the commerce department. He also doubled as captain of a local football team called Kabale Town Council (KTC).

== Politics ==
After a brief stint as a teacher in Kabale, Amos returned to Kasese District where he found himself into the political limelight having been nominated to represent Kasese South constituency under the Uganda Peoples Congress party as the flag bearer. At the time, Amos Mubunga had joined the Uganda Peoples Congress political party headed by Milton Obote while at Kigezi Highschool.

Amos Mubunga Kambere was elected in the 1980 Ugandan general election, making him the youngest member of parliament in the third National Assembly of Uganda.

== Books ==
Kambere has authored a number of books that include; Celebrating Literacy in the Rwenzori Region: Lest We Forget: A Biographical Narrative of Uganda's Youngest Member of Parliament, 1980–1985, in which he chronicles a step-by-step journey that led him to become Uganda's youngest member of parliament. In the book, published in 2011, he also tells the story of the Rwenzori region of Uganda and Bakonzo's struggle for recognition.

== Personal life ==
Kambere is married to Edith Kambere and together they have four sons. They live in Canada where he continues to support immigrants and refugee families through Umoja Operation Compassion Society. In Canada, Amos Mubunga studied administration and human resources at British Columbia Institute of Technology.

== See also ==
- Sam Kutesa
- Paul Ssemogerere
- Anthony Ochaya
