= Edmonton station (Via Rail) =

Railway station in Alberta, Canada

Edmonton
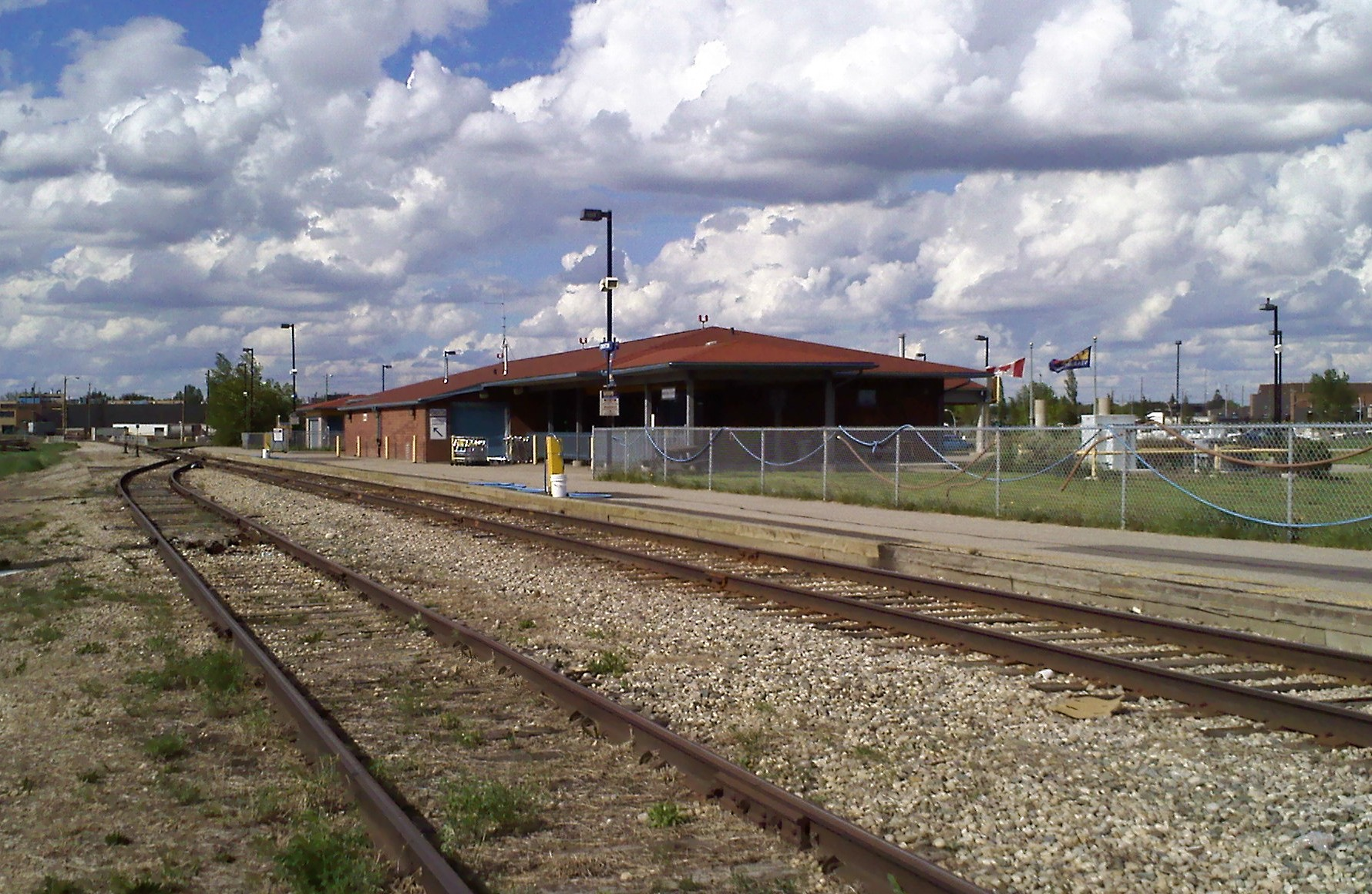

General information
- Location: 12360 121 Street NW; Edmonton, Alberta; Canada
- Coordinates: 53°34′44″N 113°31′51″W
- Owner: Via Rail
- Line: Canadian National Railway
- Platforms: 1 side platform
- Tracks: 1 and 1 passing siding

Construction
- Parking: 27 spaces
- Accessible: Yes

Other information
- Status: Staffed station
- IATA code: XZL
- Website: Edmonton train station

History
- Opened: 1998

Services
Preceding station	Via Rail	Following station
Hinton toward Vancouver	The Canadian Major stops	Viking toward Toronto
Location
- Location within Edmonton Location within Alberta Location within Canada

Edmonton station (French: gare d'Edmonton; IATA: XZL) or Edmonton Train Station, is the main inter-city train station in Edmonton, Alberta, Canada, operated by Via Rail. The railway station is located approximately 5.5 kilometres northwest of Downtown Edmonton on a spur off the Canadian National Railway near the former site of the Edmonton City Centre Airport. Served by Via Rail's The Canadian, the station is unusually located on a branch off the main line, meaning that trains must either reverse into or out. The station opened in 1998 following the closure of the downtown Via Rail station which was located in the lower level of Edmonton's CN Tower.

== Location ==
Edmonton station lies directly south of the Yellowhead Trail at 12360 121 Street NW, east of the neighbourhood of Prince Charles. It is located on the fringe of a residential area and is relatively distant from restaurants and hotels. The closest hotels are located more than a kilometre to the south on Kingsway NW near the site of the former City Centre Airport.

The station is located more than 30 kilometres north of the Edmonton International Airport in Leduc County.

== Former stations ==
Historically, this is the northwest point of a loop that trains once followed to go into downtown Edmonton. Westbound, for example, trains would divert from the mainline at East Junction (near Fort Road and 66 Street NW), head south as far as the CN passenger station, which was inside the CN Tower. The present-day Edmonton LRT parallels some of the route, and remnants of the former mainline and railyards can be seen along the way. The City Centre Campus of Grant MacEwan University lies on what was once CN railyards to the west of the former station. Trains would then swing north and rejoin the mainline at West Junction just north of the present station. Currently trains depart the station by heading out and going to the left westbound, or to the right eastbound.

== Greyhound ==
Greyhound Canada vacated its downtown Edmonton bus station in 2016 as part of the construction of Ice District and Rogers Place. A new bus station opened at the Via station on 30 May 2016. Greyhound operated a shuttle bus for their passengers with tickets, to deal with the lack of public transit to the station. There was no stop for the Edmonton Transit Service buses at the location until September 2017, when a shuttle service began for Greyhound ticket holders.

Greyhound ceased all operations west of Sudbury, including Edmonton, on 31 October 2018.

== See also ==
- List of railway stations in Canada
