= Riaz Mamdani =

Ugandan-Canadian businessman

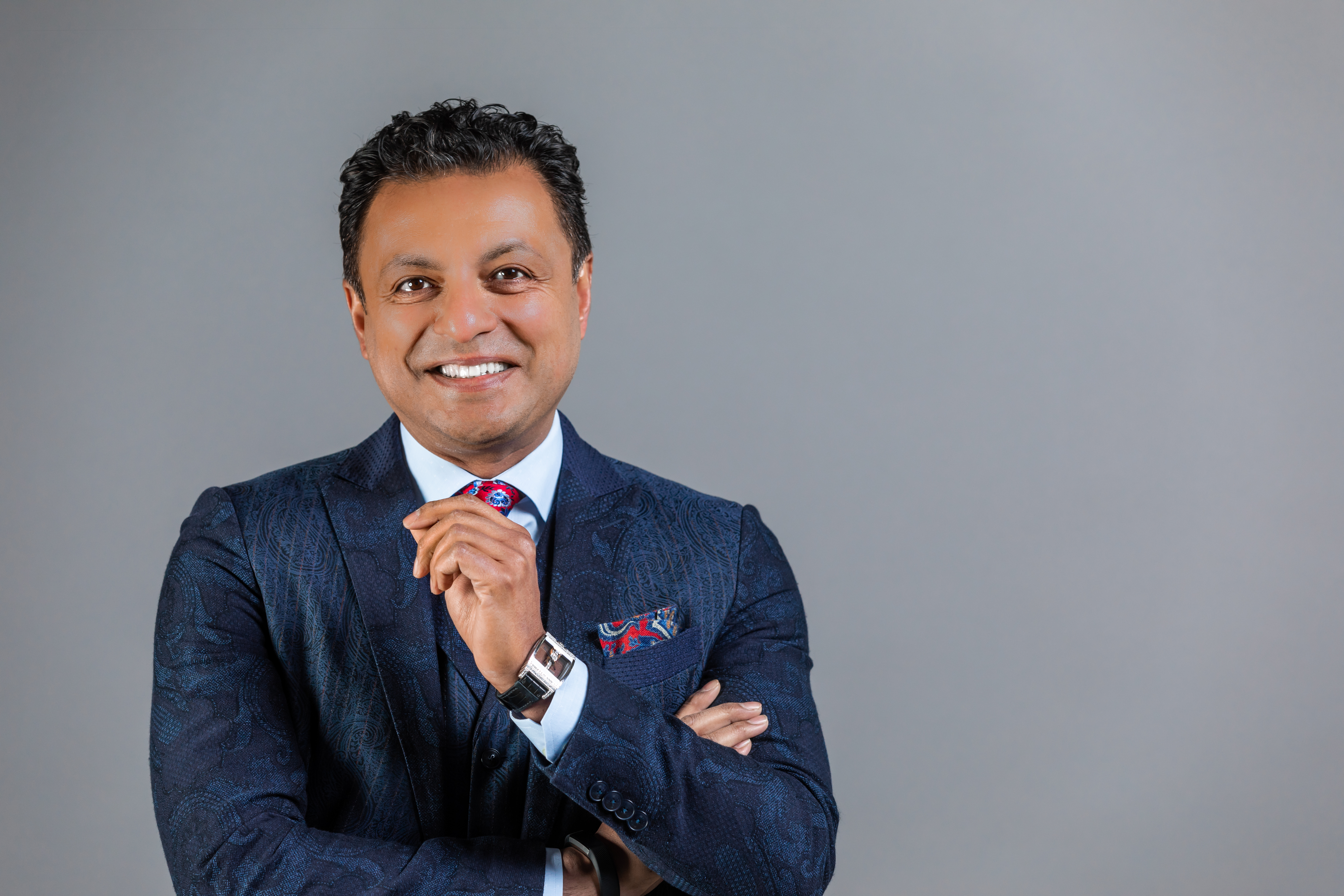
- Born: c. 1968 (age 57–58); Uganda
- Citizenship: Canadian
- Education: University of Calgary; University of Manitoba
- Occupation: Real estate executive
- Known for: Founder and CEO of Strategic Group
- Children: 4

Riaz Mamdani (born c. 1968) is a Ugandan-born Canadian businessman who is the founder and CEO of Strategic Group, a real estate investment and development company located in Calgary, Canada. In the 1990s, Mamdani gained recognition in Calgary as a financier of various startups before shifting his business efforts in the early 2000s to real estate. In part as a result of Mamdani's success in real estate, he is considered "one of Calgary’s wealthiest men".

== Early life and education ==
Born in Uganda, Riaz Mamdani immigrated to Canada with his parents and younger brother Alykhan in the early 1970s, at a very young age. His family was involved in various businesses in Calgary and in East Africa; they owned stores and real estate.

Mamdani graduated from the University of Manitoba with a Bachelor of Science degree in pharmacy in 1992 and from the University of Calgary law school in 1996. In a 2012 interview with Alberta Venture, he said that he had taken a "roundabout" way to get to his true calling, business.

== Career ==
=== Early career ===
From 1992 to 1996, Mamdani served as a pharmacist at the Foothills Hospital in Calgary, while studying law at the University of Calgary. After obtaining his law degree, he was a barrister and solicitor with Beaumont Church, a Calgary-based law firm, from 1996 to 1998, focusing on corporate, commercial, and securities law.

Beginning in the late 1990s, Mamdani's professional interest and energy moved increasingly from practicing law to involvement in the financing of companies, especially early-stage startups in and around Calgary. He has said that it was these businesses' need for more office space that originally introduced him to real estate.

=== Real estate ===
In 2001, seeing that the real estate side of his businesses was growing the fastest, Mamdani formed Strategic Group as a way to further invest in commercial real estate in and around Calgary. Strategic Group owns and develops office, retail, and apartment properties in Alberta. Mamdani began the company with two properties in its portfolio. Strategic Group is a diversified company with investments that span construction, building services, telecom, agriculture, corporate finance and technology.

In 2015, partially as a result of the weakened Alberta economy, Strategic Group announced that it would shift its concentration from commercial properties to building rental apartments. In a 2019 letter to stakeholders, Mamdani wrote that "much of the growth of our company will be in our multi-family residential rental business, and approach that is directly linked to our strategic focus on sustainability and recurring revenue." Under Mamdani's leadership, Strategic Group is repurposing former office buildings into residential buildings in Calgary and Edmonton. This includes repurposing the historically significant Barron Building from office into a residential rental building with ground-level retail. In 2019, the company completed its first office-to-residential repurposing projects including Cube in Calgary and e11even and Capital in Edmonton. Calgary Mayor Naheed Nenshi called Cube "an exciting next step for innovative development in our city." Upon the opening of e11even in October 2019, Edmonton Mayor Don Iveson said "saving thousands of tons of waste from going to the landfill while adding critical green housing options for Edmontonians is a great accomplishment.” In December 2019, in response to the prolonged economic downturn in Alberta, Strategic Group began a process of court-monitored restructuring to ensure the long-term viability of the company. This work was completed in early 2022 with the company reducing its debt by $1.02 billion and reducing its exposure to the Alberta office real estate market by 92%.

In 2020, Strategic Group completed two major building projects: Capital in Edmonton and UPTEN in Calgary. The latter represents an "unprecedented" building boom of residential rental towers in Calgary which is driven by a lack of supply, changing demographics, and increasingly positive attitudes toward rental living.

In 2021, as part Strategic Group's response to the global pandemic, the company was one of the first real estate companies to create a policy requiring vaccination against COVID-19. This policy included all employees and tenants within its residential buildings in Alberta.

Also in 2021, the Court of Queen’s Bench granted a court order summarily dismissing all claims against Strategic Group companies and its leadership in a class action lawsuit that started in 2012. Under the terms of this "incredibly rare" order, the plaintiffs are obligated to pay Strategic Group a partial compensation for legal fees and reputational harm caused by the plaintiffs’ unfounded allegations.

Mamdani is an investor and shareholder in a number of other business ventures.

== Philanthropy ==
Mamdani entered into a multi-year partnership with Calgary Opera to support its transition to a new location. As a result of Mamdani's contribution, Calgary Opera changed the name of its building to Mamdani Opera Centre. Through Strategic Group, Mamdani also supports arts organizations in Calgary such as Theatre Calgary, and Alberta Theatre Projects, as well as other smaller, grassroots organizations.

== Shooting ==
On December 19, 2016, Mamdani was the target of a shooting while he sat in the driver's seat of a Rolls-Royce Phantom in front of his home in Upper Mount Royal, Calgary. Moments following the shooting, explosions were reported in the 3800 block of 6th Street S.W. The Calgary Fire Department stated they found an empty car on fire in an alley which caused the explosions, leading to speculation that the incident was connected to Mamdani's shooting. Mamdani sustained serious injuries and has since fully recovered.
