= Media in Red Deer, Alberta =

This is a list of media in Red Deer, Alberta.

== Radio ==
Frequency	Call sign	Branding	Format	Owner	Notes
FM 89.9	CKTC-FM	-	Tourist information	Red Deer Visitor and Convention Bureau	
FM 90.5	CKRD-FM	Shine FM	Contemporary Christian music	Touch Canada Broadcasting Limited Partnership	
FM 94.1	CJUV-FM	Sunny 94	Classic hits	Golden West Broadcasting	Licensed in Lacombe, AB
FM 95.5	CKGY-FM	New Country 95.5	Country	Stingray Group	
FM 98.9	CIZZ-FM	Zed 98.9	Classic rock	Stingray Group	
FM 99.9	CBR-FM-1	CBC Music	Public broadcasting	Canadian Broadcasting Corporation	Rebroadcaster of CBR-FM (Calgary, AB)
FM 100.7	CKEX-FM	X100.7	Alternative rock	Harvard Broadcasting	
FM 101.3	CKIK-FM	Play 101.3	Rhythmic adult contemporary	Harvard Broadcasting	
FM 102.1	CBRD-FM	CBC Radio 1	Public broadcasting	Canadian Broadcasting Corporation	Rebroadcster of CBR (AM) (Calgary, AB)
FM 103.5	CHFA-FM-2	Ici Radio-Canada Première	Public broadcasting	Canadian Broadcasting Corporation	Rebroadcaster of CHFA-FM (Edmonton, AB)
FM 105.5	CHUB-FM	BIG 105	Hot adult contemporary	Pattison Media	
FM 106.7	CFDV-FM	106.7 Rewind Radio	Classic hits	Pattison Media	
FM 107.7	CKUA-FM-6	CKUA	Public radio	CKUA Radio Foundation	Rebroadcaster of CKUA-FM (Edmonton, AB)

== Television ==
Until August 2009, Red Deer was served by a local television station, CHCA-TV channel 6, carrying programming from Canada's E! network. CHCA closed on August 31, 2009 due to economic troubles endured by its parent company, Canwest.

All of the city's other television services are rebroadcasters of stations from Edmonton. Red Deer is not designated as a mandatory market for digital television conversion, although all of the rebroadcasters are now full converted over to Digital Television as of November 2023.

- Channel 4.1: CKEM-DT-1, Citytv
- Channel 8: CFRN-DT-6, CTV
- Channel 10.1: CITV-DT-1, Global

After CHCA dropped its longtime affiliation with CBC Television in 2005, Edmonton's CBXT set up a rebroadcaster in Red Deer. Radio-Canada outlet CBXFT already operated a rebroadcaster there, and both stations had been available for decades on cable in the city. They were shut down with the CBC's other rebroadcasters in 2012, meaning Red Deer residents need cable or satellite to watch CBC and Radio-Canada programming. Few residents lost access, however, due to the extremely high penetration of cable and satellite in the area.

Cable television in Red Deer is served by Rogers Communications(formerly Shaw Communications), who operates a local community channel under the "Rogers TV" name. Discounting Rogers TV, Red Deer, with a population approaching 100,000, is one of the largest standalone urban centres in Canada (i.e. one that is not part of a larger metropolitan area) without a local TV station.

== Newspapers ==
- Red Deer Advocate

== Online news media ==
- rdnewsNOW: Launched in 2016 as an evolution of 106.7 REWIND Radio and BIG 105.5 news. rdnewsNOW is an online short and long-form news outlet, and is part of Pattison Media, sharing news resources with CHUB-FM and CFDV-FM. Slogan: Everything Red Deer.
- Todayville: A digital local news platform launched by the former VP of CFRN-TV-6
