= CBC Calgary =

CBC Calgary refers to:

- CBR (AM) and CBR-1-FM, CBC Radio One on 1010 AM and 99.1 FM
- CBR-FM, CBC Radio 2 on 102.1 FM
- CBRT-DT, CBC Television on channel 9

SRC Calgary refers to:

- CBRF-FM, Ici Radio-Canada Première on 103.9 FM, rebroadcasts CHFA
- CBCX-FM, Ici Musique on 89.7 FM
- CBRFT, Ici Radio-Canada Télé on channel 16, rebroadcasts CBXFT
