= Media in Edmonton =

This is a list of media outlets for the city of Edmonton, Alberta, Canada. Many of these outlets – in particular the daily newspapers and the radio and TV broadcasters – also serve the numerous cities and communities in close proximity to Edmonton, including St. Albert, Sherwood Park, Fort Saskatchewan, Leduc, and Spruce Grove.

== Radio ==
AM/FM

Frequency	Call sign	Branding	Format	Owner	Notes
AM 580	CHAH	My Radio 580	multilingual	1811258 Alberta Ltd.	
AM 740	CBX	CBC Radio One	news/talk	Canadian Broadcasting Corporation	
AM 840	CFCW	840 CFCW	country	Stingray Group	
AM 880	CHED	880 CHED	news/talk/sports	Corus Entertainment	Launched in 1954.
AM 930	CJCA	AM 930 The Light	gospel music	Touch Canada Broadcasting	Alberta's first radio station, established in 1922, currently broadcasting religious content.
AM 1440	CKJR	Sports 1440	sports	Stingray Group	
FM 88.5	CJSR-FM	CJSR FM88	campus radio	First Alberta Campus Radio Association	
FM 89.3	CIWE-FM	The Raven	First Nations	Aboriginal Multi-Media Society	
FM 90.1	CHFA-FM	ICI Radio-Canada Première	news/talk	Canadian Broadcasting Corporation	French
FM 90.9	CBX-FM	CBC Music	public music	Canadian Broadcasting Corporation	
FM 91.7	CHBN-FM	KiSS 91.7	contemporary hit radio	Rogers Radio	
FM 92.5	CKNG-FM	'Chuck @ 92.5	Adult hits	Corus Entertainment	
FM 93.1	CJLD-FM	The One	country music	Blackgold Broadcasting	Broadcasts to Leduc and surrounding area
FM 93.9	CBX-2-FM	CBC Radio One	news/talk	Canadian Broadcasting Corporation	
FM 94.9	CKUA-FM	CKUA Radio Network	public broadcasting	CKUA Radio Foundation	province-wide public radio network
FM 95.7	CKEA-FM	95.7 Cruz FM	mainstream rock	Harvard Broadcasting	
FM 96.3	CKRA-FM	96.3 The Breeze	soft adult contemporary	Stingray Group	
FM 97.3	CIRK-FM	K-97	classic rock	Stingray Group	
FM 97.9	CFED-FM	Radio Cité 97,9	francophone community radio	Société de la radio communautaire du Grand Edmonton	
FM 98.5	CFWE-FM-4	CFWE	country, First Nationscommunity radio	Aboriginal Multi-Media Society	
FM 99.3	CIUP-FM	up! 99.3	adult hits	Jim Pattison Group	
FM 100.3	CFBR-FM	The Bear	active rock	Bell Media	
FM 101.1	CBCX-FM-1	Ici Musique	public music	Canadian Broadcasting Corporation	French
FM 101.7	CKER-FM	101.7 Connect FM	multilingual	Akash Broadcasting Inc	
FM 102.3	CKNO-FM	NOW! Radio	hot adult contemporary	Jim Pattison Group	
FM 102.9	CHDI-FM	Sonic 102.9	modern rock	Rogers Media	
FM 103.9	CISN-FM	CISN Country 103.9	country	Corus Entertainment	
FM 104.9	CFMG-FM	104.9 Virgin Radio	contemporary hit radio	Bell Media	
FM 105.9	CJRY-FM	Shine FM	Christian music	Touch Canada Broadcasting	
FM 107.1	CKPW-FM	Play 107	rhythmic adult contemporary	Harvard Broadcasting	
FM 107.9	CKFT-FM	Mix 107.9 FM	adult contemporary	Kenner Media Ltd.	

== Television ==
OTA virtual channel (PSIP)	OTA actual channel	Shaw Cable	Call sign	Network	Notes
3.1	12 (VHF)	2	CFRN-DT	CTV	
5.1	25 (UHF)	4	CBXT-DT	CBC Television	
11.1	27 (UHF)	12	CBXFT-DT	Ici Radio-Canada Télé	
13.1	13 (VHF)	8	CITV-DT	Global	
45.1	30 (UHF)	51	CKES-DT	Yes TV	
51.1	17 (UHF)	7	CKEM-DT	Citytv	
56.1	16 (UHF)	11	CJEO-DT	Omni Television	

CTV Two Alberta ceased broadcasting over-the-air in Edmonton on August 31, 2011.

The cable television provider in Edmonton is Shaw Cable. Network programming from the United States is received on cable via affiliates from Spokane, Washington. While prime time in most of Canada runs from 8 pm to 11 pm, American prime time shows on weekdays run from 9 pm to midnight in Edmonton, since Spokane is in the Pacific Time Zone. Although Edmonton is in the Mountain Time Zone, many of the American cities closer to Edmonton didn't have full network service until the late 1980s. Edmonton has more than double the population of the Spokane stations' American coverage area. See also Shaw TV Edmonton.

== Newspapers ==
Edmonton has two large-circulation daily newspapers:

- Edmonton Journal
- Edmonton Sun

Edmonton had one free weekly paper focusing on the city's independent arts and entertainment, Vue Weekly. It ceased publication at the end of 2018.

The free daily newspaper StarMetro was published in the city from Monday to Friday, but was shut down by the Toronto Star in December 2019.

The weekly Edmonton Examiner is also delivered free to households in Edmonton. The Edmonton Senior is a monthly newspaper aimed at seniors.

The University of Alberta has two regular publications: official student newspaper The Gateway, and alumni magazine New Trail. Grant MacEwan University's is student newspaper The Griff, but was known as Intercamp until 2011. NAIT's student paper is The Nugget.

== See other ==
- List of television stations in Alberta
- List of radio stations in Alberta
