= CBC Edmonton =

CBC Edmonton may refer to:

- CBX (AM) and CBX-2-FM, CBC Radio One on 740 AM and 93.9 FM
- CBX-FM, CBC Radio 2 on 90.9 FM
- CBXT-DT, CBC Television on channel 5

== See also ==
- CHFA (AM), Première Chaîne on 680 AM
- CBCX-FM-1, Espace Musique on 90.1 FM, rebroadcasts CBCX-FM
- CBXFT-DT, Ici Radio-Canada Télé on channel 11
