= Centre Point Place =

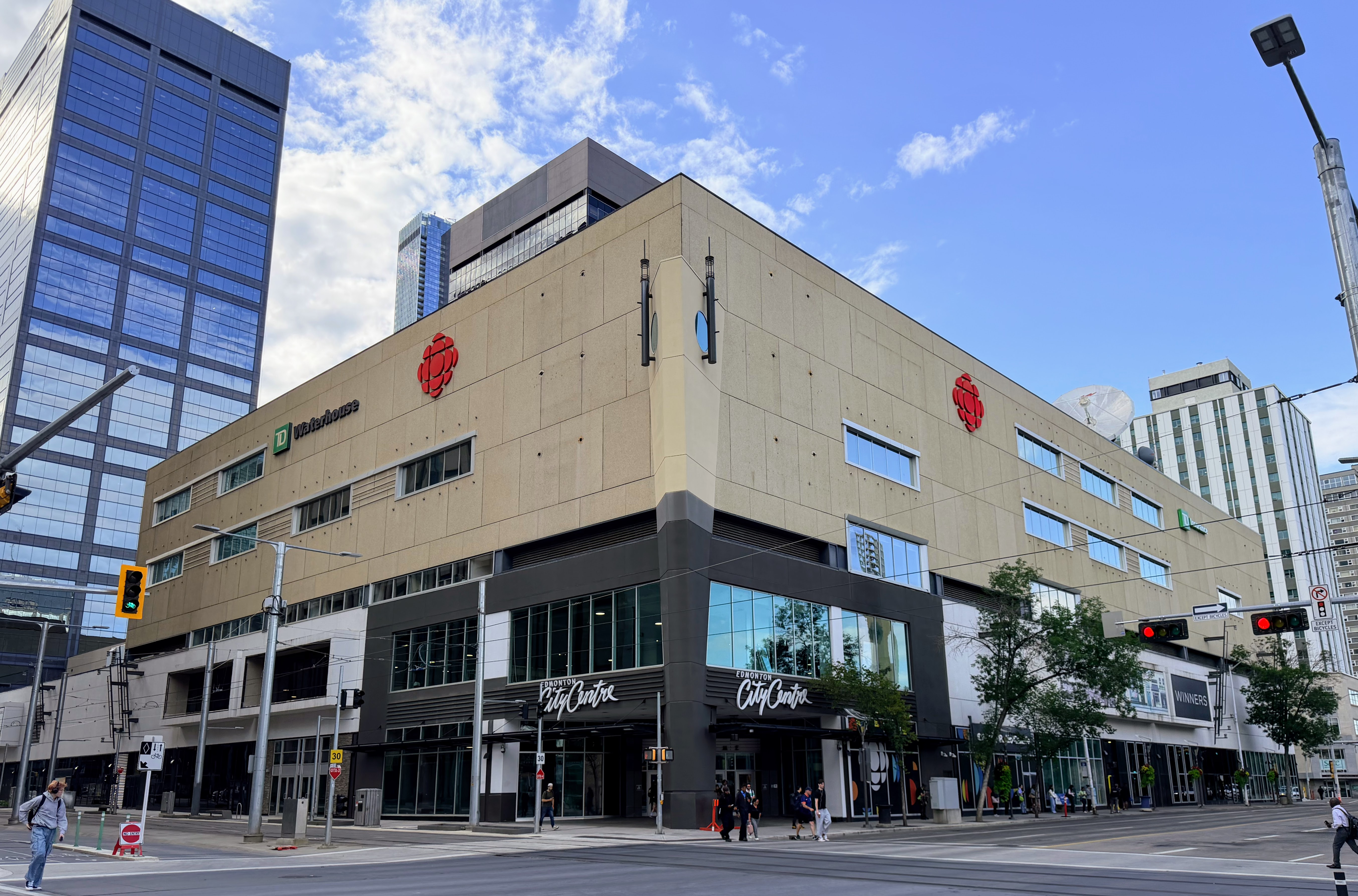
- Centre Point Place occupies the upper section, with the Edmonton City Centre retail concourse forming the lower section.

- Location within Edmonton

General information
- Status: Under contract for sale
- Type: Commercial office
- Location: 10205 101 Street NW; Edmonton, Alberta, Canada
- Coordinates: 53°32′39″N 113°29′36″W
- Construction started: 1972
- Completed: 1974
- Owner: Westrich Pacific (pending sale closing late 2026)
- Operator: Canderel (Humford Management)

Technical details
- Floor count: 4
- Floor area: 106,803 sq ft (9,922.3 m^{2})

Centre Point Place is a four-storey commercial office property in Downtown Edmonton, Alberta, Canada. Located at 10205 101 Street NW, the building forms an integral low-rise office and broadcast component of the Edmonton City Centre complex. Originally built as part of the Edmonton Centre development to house a flagship Woodward's department store, the building was subsequently occupied by The Bay before its upper floors were converted into Class A office and broadcast facilities as Centre Point Place in the early 2000s.

== History ==
The structure was completed in 1974 as part of the original Edmonton Centre retail development, serving as the department store anchor for Woodward's. After the Hudson's Bay Company acquired Woodward's in 1993, The Bay occupied the former Woodward's building at Edmonton Centre. The Bay remained there until May 2002, when it relocated within the newly consolidated Edmonton City Centre complex to the former Eaton's store west of 101 Street.

The upper floors of the former Woodward's building were subsequently converted into Class A, urban warehouse-style office and broadcast space as Centre Point Place. The exact date of the conversion is unclear, but by November 2003, CBC Edmonton was scheduled to move its English- and French-language radio and television operations into a new 38,700 sq ft (3,600 m^{2}) digital broadcast facility at Edmonton City Centre. The premises became the downtown headquarters and production studios for the Canadian Broadcasting Corporation's Edmonton operations, including CBXT-DT, CBXFT-DT, CBX, CBX-FM, and CHFA-FM.

In November 2019, Oxford Properties sold the entire 1.4-million-square-foot Edmonton City Centre complex—including Centre Point Place, TD Tower, 102A Tower, and the retail shopping centre—to a joint venture comprising LaSalle Investment Management, Bayerische Versorgungskammer (BVK), North American Development Group (NADG), and Canderel, operating under Edmonton City Centre Inc. Following the sale, office operations and leasing management were assumed by Canderel (Humford Management).

In July 2025, mortgage lender Otéra Capital (a subsidiary of CDPQ) placed Edmonton City Centre, including Centre Point Place, into court-ordered receivership after the ownership group defaulted on nearly $140 million in debt obligations.

On August 7, 2026, an Alberta Court of King's Bench justice approved the court-ordered sale of the entire complex to Edmonton-based real estate developer Westrich Pacific, with the transaction scheduled to close by the end of 2026.

== Design and specifications ==
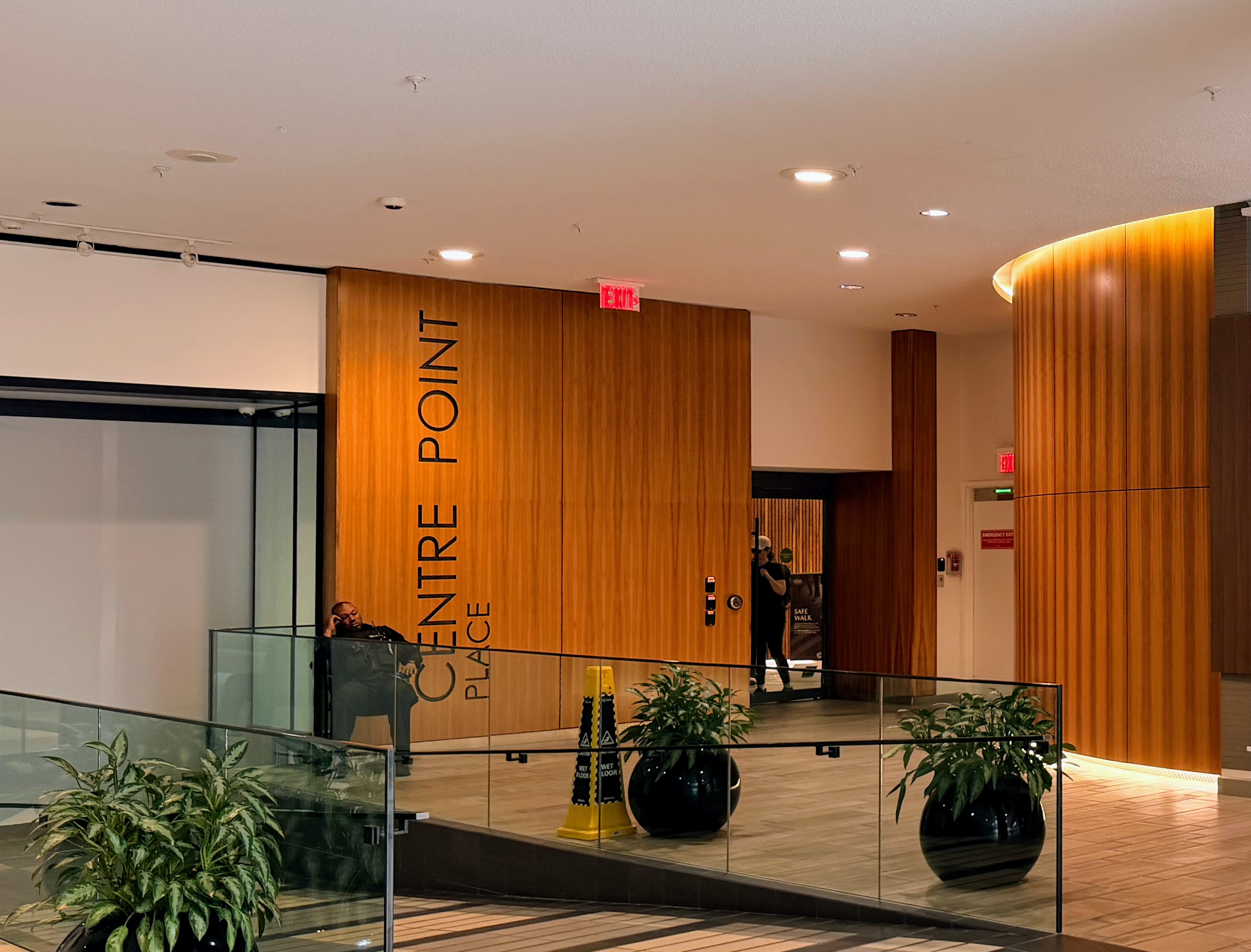
Entrance to Centre Point Place from the upper level of Edmonton City Centre, August 2026.

Unlike the vertical office high-rises in the complex, Centre Point Place is configured with wide floor plates characteristic of large-format retail conversions. The building features:

- Typical floor plates of approximately 58,000 sq ft (5,400 m^{2}), allowing contiguous single-floor lease footprints up to 43,701 sq ft (4,060.0 m^{2}).
- Exposed ceiling heights measuring 16 feet (4.9 m) to deck and 12.5 feet (3.8 m) to tile.
- An efficient 7% gross-up factor.
- Enclosed, direct indoor access to the Edmonton Pedway network, Edmonton City Centre Mall, and the Edmonton LRT system (via 102 Street station and Churchill station).
- Integrated access to building amenities in the adjacent 102A Tower, including a conference centre, social lounge, and fitness studio.

== Major tenants ==
- Canadian Broadcasting Corporation (CBC Edmonton English and French media operations)

== See also ==
- Edmonton City Centre
- 102A Tower
- TD Tower
- Edmonton Pedway
