= CKRD =

CKRD may refer to:

- CKRD-FM, a radio station (90.5 FM) licensed to Red Deer, Alberta, Canada
- CHUB-FM, a radio station (105.5 FM) licensed to Red Deer, Alberta, Canada, which held the call sign CKRD from 1949 to 2000
- CHCA-TV, a defunct television station (channel 6) licensed to Red Deer, Alberta, Canada, which held the call sign CKRD-TV from 1965 to 2005
- CIZZ-FM, a radio station in Red Deer, Alberta which used the call letters CKRD-FM from 1965 to 1987.
