= TD Tower (Edmonton) =

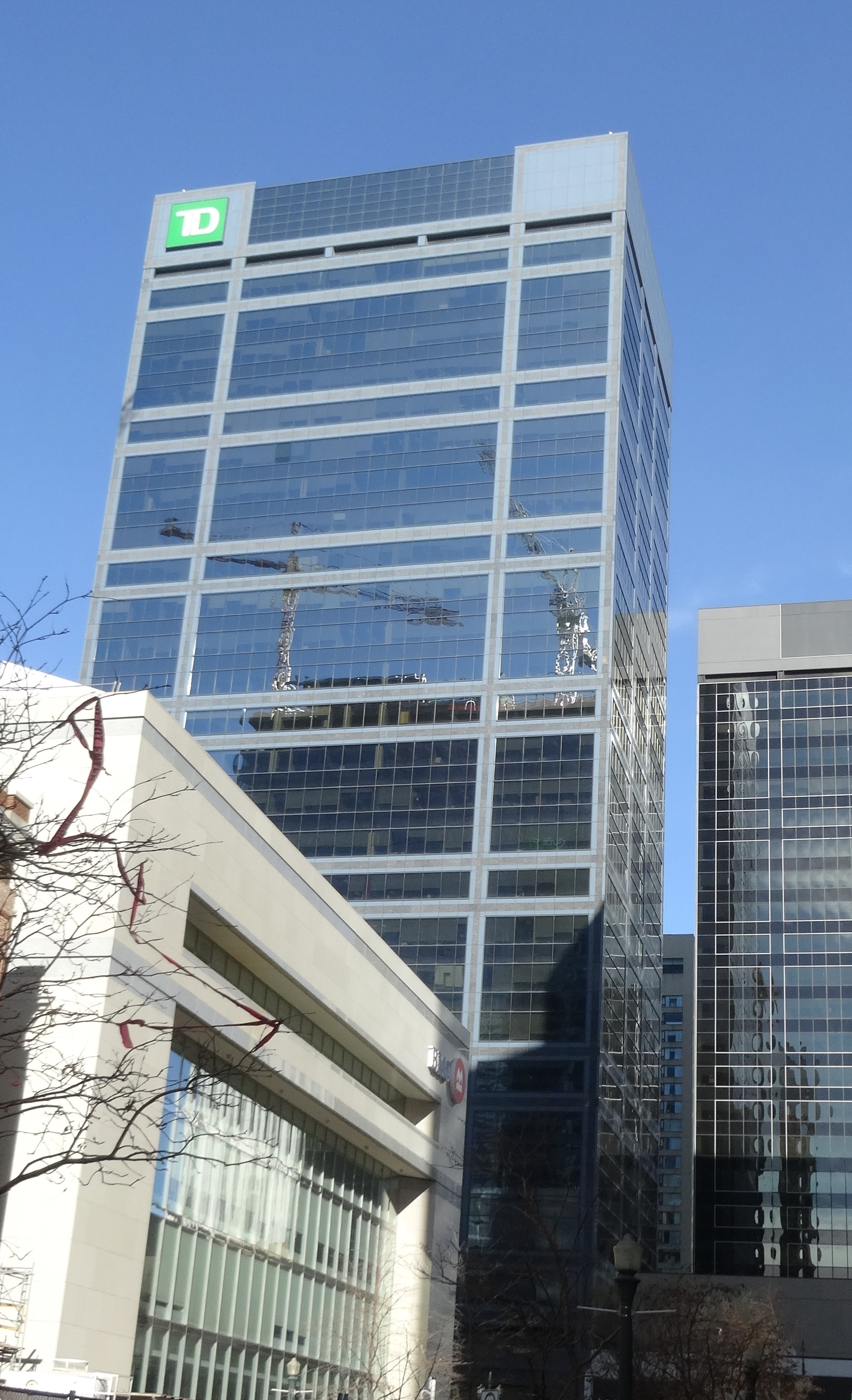
- TD Tower in downtown Edmonton

- Location within Edmonton

General information
- Status: Completed
- Type: Office
- Location: 10088 102 Avenue NW; Edmonton, Alberta, Canada
- Coordinates: 53°32′37″N 113°29′35″W
- Construction started: 1974
- Completed: 1976
- Owner: Edmonton City Centre Inc. (in receivership)
- Operator: Canderel

Height
- Roof: 116.7 m (383 ft)

Technical details
- Floor count: 29
- Floor area: 370,190 sq ft (34,392 m^{2})
- Lifts/elevators: 9

Design and construction
- Architect: Skidmore, Owings & Merrill
- Developer: Oxford Properties

TD Tower is an office skyscraper in Downtown Edmonton, Alberta, Canada. Located at 10088 102 Avenue NW, it forms part of the Edmonton City Centre office and retail complex. The tower stands 116.7 m (383 ft) tall and has 29 above-ground floors according to the Council on Vertical Urbanism. It was developed by Oxford Properties and designed by Skidmore, Owings & Merrill.

Current leasing information lists approximately 370,190 sq ft (34,392 m^{2}) of office space in the building. The tower is directly integrated with Edmonton City Centre and the downtown Edmonton Pedway network, providing indoor connections to the shopping centre and Edmonton LRT.

== History ==
Construction of TD Tower began in 1974 as part of the expansion of the original Edmonton Centre development, and the building was completed in 1976. It was developed by Oxford Properties and designed by Skidmore, Owings & Merrill. Contemporary plans for Edmonton Centre had projected the tower to be ready for occupancy in 1976.

In November 2019, Oxford Properties sold the Edmonton City Centre complex, including TD Tower, to a joint venture comprising LaSalle Investment Management's LaSalle Canada Property Fund, Universal-Investment on behalf of Bayerische Versorgungskammer (BVK), North American Development Group (NADG), and Canderel. At the time of the sale, the tower was described as a 29-storey building containing more than 330,000 sq ft (31,000 m^{2}) of office space. Canderel subsequently assumed management of the office and parking components of Edmonton City Centre, including TD Tower.

On July 7, 2025, the Alberta Court of King's Bench appointed PricewaterhouseCoopers Inc. as receiver of Edmonton City Centre Inc., whose assets include TD Tower.

In July 2026, the receiver sought court approval for the sale of the Edmonton City Centre properties to Westrich Management Ltd. or its nominee. The Alberta Court of King's Bench subsequently approved the sale to Edmonton-based Westrich Pacific, with the transaction expected to close before the end of 2026. The sale includes Edmonton City Centre East and West, Centre Point Place, TD Tower, 102A Tower, and associated parkades.

== Design and connectivity ==
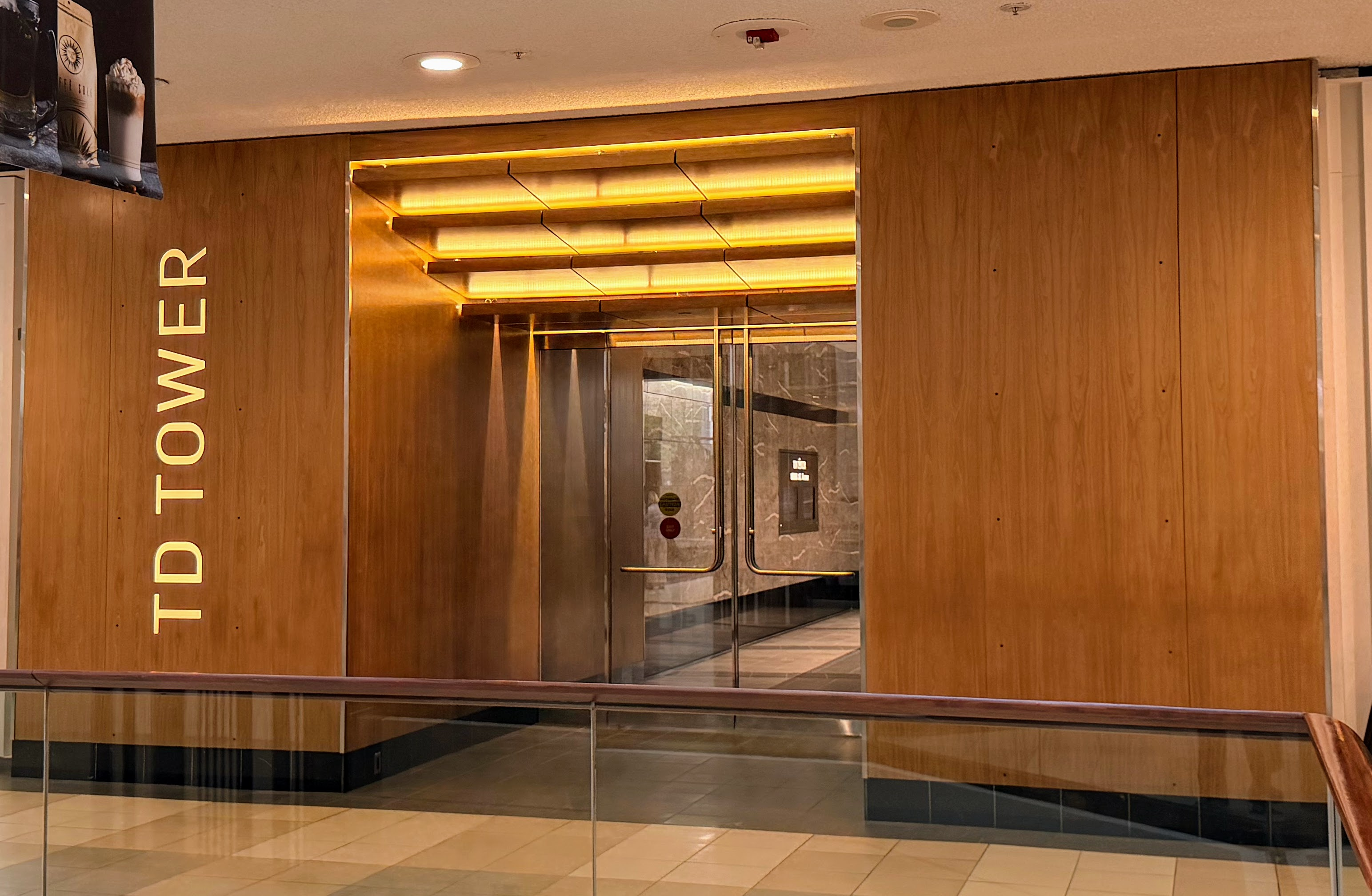
Entrance to TD Tower from the street level of Edmonton City Centre, August 2026.

TD Tower is connected directly to the Edmonton City Centre retail complex and the downtown Edmonton Pedway network. The building provides indoor connections to the Edmonton LRT and surrounding downtown buildings.

The tower is professionally managed on site by Canderel. Current property information lists nine passenger elevators, consisting of five serving the high-rise portion and four serving the low-rise portion of the tower. The property underwent renovations in 2015 and has been listed as holding LEED Gold, BOMA BEST Gold and WiredScore Silver certifications.

Current leasing materials describe TD Tower as having 28 floors, while the Council on Vertical Urbanism counts 29 above-ground floors under its standardized tall-building methodology.

== See also ==
- Edmonton City Centre
- 102A Tower
- MNP Tower
- List of tallest buildings in Edmonton
