= CBRD =

CBRD may refer to:

- CBRD (AM), a radio rebroadcaster (860 AM) licensed to Field, British Columbia, Canada, rebroadcasting CBTK-FM
- CBRD-FM, a radio rebroadcaster (102.5 FM) licensed to Red Deer, Alberta, Canada, rebroadcasting CBR
