= MNP Tower (Edmonton) =

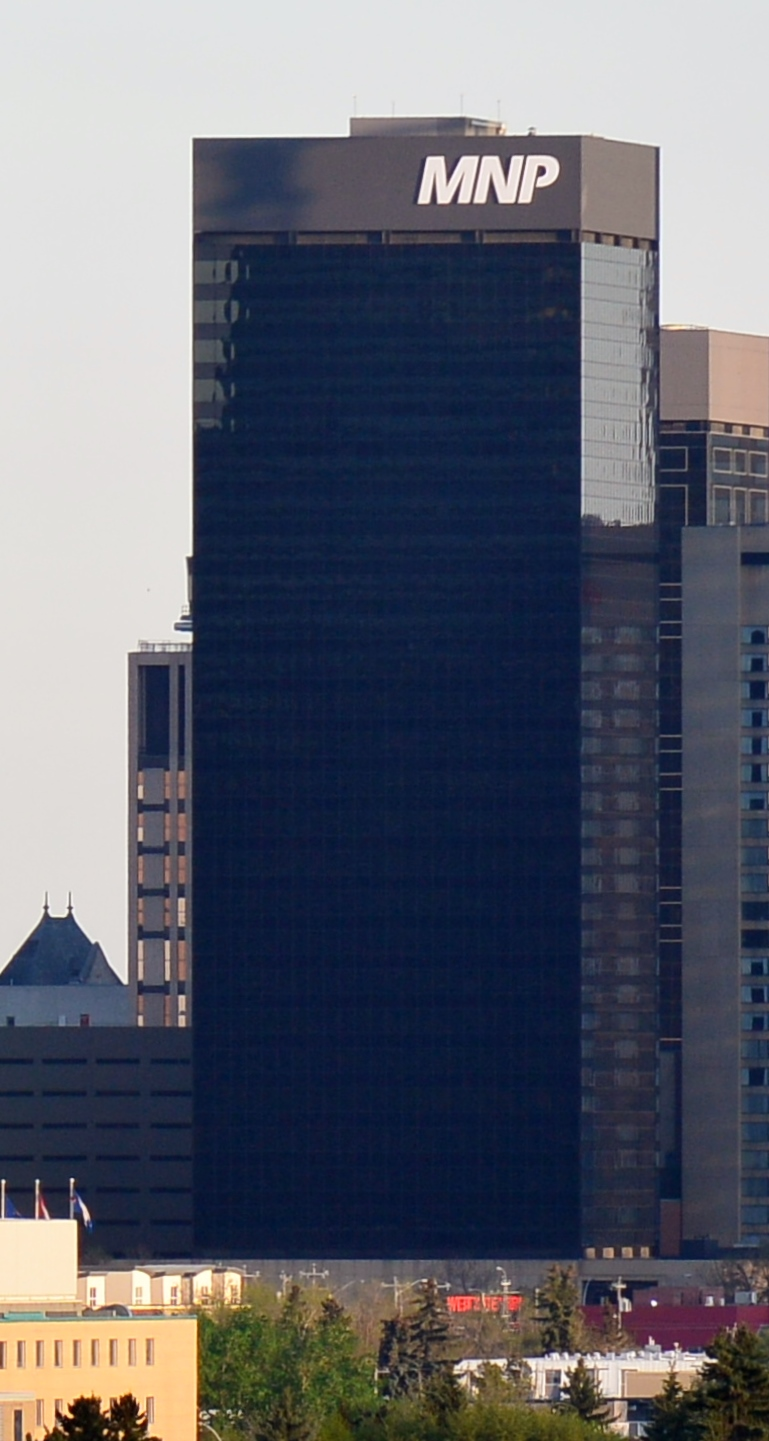
- MNP Tower (2016)

- Location within Edmonton
- Former names: Oxford Tower; 101 Street Tower

General information
- Type: Office
- Location: 10235 101 Street NW; Edmonton, Alberta, Canada
- Coordinates: 53°32′43″N 113°29′34″W
- Completed: 1978
- Opened: November 1, 1978
- Owner: Aspen Properties Ltd.

Height
- Roof: 117.59 m (385.8 ft)

Technical details
- Floor count: 29
- Floor area: 29,852 m^{2} (321,320 sq ft)

Design and construction
- Architects: Skidmore, Owings & Merrill (Initial Design) Forbes Lord Feldberg Schmidt Croll (Design Development, Construction Documentation, and Construction Contract Administration)

MNP Tower, originally known as Oxford Tower and later as 101 Street Tower, is an office tower in Edmonton, Alberta, Canada. It stands at 118 metres (387 feet) or 29 stories tall and was completed in 1978, opening for occupancy on November 1 of that year. Tenants include MNP LLP, Longview Systems, MLT Aikins LLP, Emery Jamieson LLP, and SNC Lavalin.

== History ==
The building was developed by Oxford Properties as part of the Edmonton Centre complex. Initially named Oxford Tower, it opened for occupancy on November 1, 1978. It was renamed 101 Street Tower by 2013. By early 2016, it had been renamed MNP Tower.

The Edmonton Centre complex also included the 102A Tower (originally Royal Trust Tower), Edmonton City Centre mall, TD Tower and the Delta Edmonton Centre Suite Hotel. The buildings are connected by the Edmonton Pedway system, which also provides access to the Edmonton LRT.

== Honors and awards ==
In 2016 MNP Tower was awarded The Outstanding Building of the Year Award from the Building Owners and Managers Association (BOMA), Edmonton chapter.

== See also ==
- List of tallest buildings in Edmonton
- MNP LLP
