= CKRD-FM =

Christian radio station in Red Deer, Alberta

- Red Deer, Alberta; Canada
- Broadcast area: Red Deer County
- Frequency: 90.5 MHz
- Branding: Shine 90.5 FM

Programming
- Format: Christian

Ownership
- Owner: Touch Canada Broadcasting Limited Partnership

History
- First air date: April 1, 2011
- Call sign meaning: Christ Knows Red Deer

Technical information
- Class: C1
- ERP: 18.4 kilowatts average 38 kilowatts peak
- HAAT: 246.1 metres (807 ft)
- Transmitter coordinates: 52.2764°N 113.691°W

Links
- Website: www.shinefm.com

CKRD-FM is a radio station that broadcasts a Christian format on the frequency 90.5 FM in Red Deer, Alberta, Canada.

Owned by Touch Canada Broadcasting (2006) Inc. (the general partner) and 1188011 Alberta Ltd. and Touch Canada Broadcasting Inc. (the limited partners), carrying on business as Touch Canada Broadcasting Limited Partnership, the station received Canadian Radio-television and Telecommunications Commission on December 8, 2009.

The station uses the call letters previously used by the now CIZZ-FM from 1965 to 1987. What is now CHUB-FM was CKRD-AM from 1949 to 2000. The call sign was also originally used by the now-defunct television station CHCA-TV from 1965 to 2005.
