= CBR (AM) =

Radio station in Calgary

- Calgary, Alberta; Canada
- Broadcast area: Southern Alberta
- Frequency: 1010 kHz

Programming
- Format: Public radio and talk
- Network: CBC Radio One

Ownership
- Owner: Canadian Broadcasting Corporation
- Sister stations: CBR-FM, CBCX-FM, CBRF-FM, CBRT-DT, CBXFT-DT

History
- First air date: October 1, 1964
- Call sign meaning: Canadian Broadcasting Corporation Calgary

Technical information
- Licensing authority: CRTC
- Class: AM: A (clear-channel); FM: B
- Power: 50,000 watts (AM)
- ERP: 1,870 watts (FM)
- HAAT: 331 metres (1,086 ft) (FM)
- Transmitter coordinates: 51°02′24″N 113°38′51″W

Links
- Website: CBC Calgary

CBR is a Canadian non-commercial radio station in Calgary, Alberta. It broadcasts the programming of the CBC Radio One network, both on 1010 kHz on the AM dial (as a Class A clear-channel station) and 99.1 MHz on the FM dial as CBR-FM-1. The studios are in the Parkdale neighbourhood of northwest Calgary.

The AM transmitter is east of Calgary, off the Trans-Canada Highway in Rocky View. The FM transmitter is off Old Banff Coach Road near 85th Street SW in Calgary.

The AM daytime signal covers most of the southern two-thirds of Alberta. It can be heard at city-grade strength from Red Deer to Lethbridge, and provides secondary coverage as far as Edmonton to the north and several counties on the Montana-Alberta border to the south. At night, it covers most of the western half of North America, but is strongest in Western Canada. CBR-FM-1 has an effective radiated power (ERP) of 1,870 watts (7,000 watts maximum). It covers Calgary and its adjacent suburbs.

== History ==
CBC Radio launched its first owned and operated station in Alberta on September 8, 1948. It broadcast on 1010 kilocycles with the call sign CBX. Its studios were in Edmonton and its transmitter site was near Lacombe, roughly halfway between Calgary and Edmonton, in an attempt to serve the southern two-thirds of the province from a single 50,000-watt transmitter. Prior to CBX's debut, private station CFAC had aired CBC Radio programming. While the CBC had served most of Manitoba and Saskatchewan from single transmitters, it met with far less success doing so in Alberta. In particular, reception in Calgary left much to be desired, mainly due to interference from television signals. Edmonton listeners also reported issues, forcing the CBC to set up a "nested" AM repeater in Edmonton.

As early as 1956, the CBC had begun considering separate stations in Edmonton and Calgary in order to rectify CBX's weak signal in Calgary. on October 1, 1964, the original CBX transmitter was decommissioned. The single station was split into two distinct 50,000-watt stations: one serving Edmonton and one serving Calgary. The Edmonton station kept the CBX call sign but moved to a frequency of 740 kHz. The Calgary station retained CBX's former frequency of 1010 kHz and clear-channel designation under the call sign CBR.

On March 16, 2006, the Canadian Radio-television and Telecommunications Commission (CRTC) approved an application by the station to implement a new, nested FM transmitter in Calgary. It would simulcast the AM programming, due to the AM signal's poor reception in some parts of the city. This new FM signal, CBR-1-FM 99.1 was launched on November 28, 2006. In recent years, the CBC has branded 99.1 as the main transmitter, even though 1010 AM is technically the main station. Various other AM and FM rebroadcasters have been installed throughout southern Alberta to carry CBR's programming. On December 19, 2008, the licensee proposed to use a subsidiary communications authority (SCA) channel to broadcast multi-cultural programs.

On July 7, 2011, the CRTC approved an application by the CBC to relocate CBR's transmitter and antenna array from their original site in southeast Calgary. They would be moved to a site 25 kilometres (16 mi) to the northeast in Rocky View County. Despite changing the transmitter's location, all other technical parameters would remain unchanged. The move was completed in 2013.

== Local programming ==
CBR's local programs are Calgary Eyeopener on weekday mornings, and The Homestretch on weekday afternoons.

== Transmitters ==
Rebroadcasters of CBR
City of licence	Identifier	Frequency	Power	Class	RECNet	CRTC Decision	Notes
Banff	CBRB-FM	96.3 FM	1,180 watts	A	Query	CRTC 2005-225	51°12′3.96″N 115°35′56.40″W
Calgary	CBR-1-FM	99.1 FM	7,000 watts	B1	Query	2006-84	51°3′54″N 114°12′50.40″W
Coleman	CBR-2-FM	102.3 FM	51 watts	LP	Query	CRTC 2013-1	49°38′53.88″N 114°29′49.20″W
Coutts	CBRA-FM	90.9 FM	720 watts	A	Query		49°4′33.96″N 112°1′44.40″W
Etzikom	CBRI-FM	92.1 FM	1,114 watts	A	Query		49°33′59.04″N 111°7′55.20″W
Exshaw	CBRE-FM	100.7 FM	138 watts	A1	Query		51°3′37.08″N 115°9′46.80″W
Harvie Heights	CBRC-FM	97.9 FM	420 watts	A	Query		51°7′50.16″N 115°22′58.80″W
Lethbridge	CBRL-FM	100.1 FM	100,000 watts	C	Query		49°44′9.96″N 112°48′14.40″W
Medicine Hat	CBRM-FM	98.3 FM	3,000 watts	A	Query	93-19	50°2′45.96″N 110°37′12″W
Pincher Creek	CBRP-FM	97.5 FM	44 watts	A1	Query		49°28′49.08″N 113°57′54″W
Red Deer	CBRD-FM	102.5 FM	3,570 watts	B	Query		52°18′48.96″N 113°57′32.40″W
Lake Louise	CBRQ-FM	103.9 FM	130 watts	A1	Query	CRTC 2015-310	51°26′12.12″N 116°11′13.20″W

On January 18, 1993, the CRTC approved the CBC's application to operate new FM transmitters at Medicine Hat 98.3 MHz and Etzikom 92.1 MHz. The new FM transmitter at Medicine Hat would replace CJMH the existing AM transmitter 1460 kHz owned by Monarch Broadcasting Ltd. Monarch would surrender the license of CJMH once the new transmitters were in operation.

On August 15, 2013, the CRTC approved the deletion of AM transmitters CBXC 1450 kHz Coleman and CBXL 860 kHz Blairmore.

On April 30, 2015, the CBC submitted an application to add a new FM transmitter at 103.9 MHz in Lake Louise with the call sign CBRQ-FM. The CRTC approved the CBC's application to operate a CBC Radio One transmitter at Lake Louise on July 14, 2015. The 103.9 MHz frequency was previously used by a radio station VF2105 in Lake Louise which was owned by the Lake Louise Community Association.
