= CHCA-TV =

Television station in Red Deer, Alberta (1957–2009)

Red Deer, Alberta; Canada
- Channels: Analog: 6 (VHF)
- Branding: CHCA News

Programming
- Affiliations: E!

Ownership
- Owner: Canwest; (Canwest Media, Inc.)
- Sister stations: CITV-TV, CICT-TV

History
- First air date: December 11, 1957
- Last air date: August 31, 2009
- Former call signs: CHCA-TV (1957-1965, 2005-2009); CKRD-TV (1965-2005)
- Former affiliations: CBC (1957-2005); CH (2005-2007); E! (2007-2009)
- Call sign meaning: Central Alberta

Technical information
- ERP: 100 kW
- HAAT: 249 metres (817 ft)
- Transmitter coordinates: 52°16′30″N 113°41′28″W
- Translator(s): see below

CHCA-TV was a television station in Red Deer, Alberta, Canada. It was owned by Canwest, and was part of the E! television system. The station was seen on VHF channel 6 and cable channel 11 in Red Deer. The station was previously Red Deer's CBC affiliate. CHCA had its studios on Bremner Avenue in Downtown Red Deer (where CHUB and CFDV are currently based) and transmitter off Range Road 265 in Red Deer County.

Canwest announced in February 2009 that it was reviewing several options, including closure, for its E! stations due to financial pressures. The station closed on August 31, 2009.

== History ==
The station began broadcasting on December 11, 1957 as CHCA-TV, the "CA" standing for Central Alberta. The station's founder was Fred Bartley. In September 1965, the call letters were changed to CKRD-TV, the RD standing for Red Deer.

In the period between 1969 and 1976, CKRD was owned by Henry Flock and Gordon Spackman who also owned two radio stations with the same moniker in Red Deer (CKRD and CKRD-FM). Past employees of that era included Danny Teed, Ron MacLean, Martin Smith and Al Coates. In 1976, Monarch Broadcasting purchased the station, and in 1989, was purchased by Allarcom (not to be confused with Allarco). Allarcom merged with WIC in 1991, before being purchased by Canwest in 2000.

RDTV's first logo. The second logo, used in the late 90s through 2005, was similar to this logo, but was tilted and was in 3D. This 2D version was used in the 1990s. For the logo used as CH see the CH article.

In the days as CKRD, the station was known on air as RDTV. Its general slogan was "The Heart of the West", and its news slogan was "Our focus is YOU". CKRD broadcast a minimum of 40 hours of programming from the CBC, with the rest of the programming coming from WIC, and later Canwest's CH system. Some of those who wanted a full CBC schedule could view Edmonton's CBXT in the area, other areas lacked a real CBC station. From the mid-1980s onward, it was carried on cable in Edmonton and Calgary.

News bulletins were broadcast at 12 noon and 5 p.m., with a Saturday bulletin produced by CITV Edmonton aired at either 11pm, or after Hockey Night in Canada. The weekend newscast was moved to Sundays near the end of its association with CBC.

On September 5, 2005, the station disaffiliated from the CBC and became the fourth station in the CH television system. On that date, the station changed its call letters back to the original CHCA.

Sportscaster Ron MacLean began his career at CKRD.

Plans to build rebroadcasters in Edmonton and Calgary were initially denied in 2005 by the Canadian Radio-television and Telecommunications Commission (CRTC). A new application to the same effect was approved on June 8, 2007. The Edmonton transmitter broadcast on Channel 17; the Calgary transmitter was on Channel 44. Rogers initially received approval in principle for the Calgary transmitter, but was required to submit a new application for an alternate channel number because of a conflict with Rogers Communications' contemporaneous application for new Omni Television outlets in both cities. The station was not allowed to solicit local advertising in Calgary or Edmonton (although it could theoretically accept if specifically approached by advertisers in those markets).

CHCA was relaunched on September 7, 2007 as E! Red Deer, as part of Canwest's rebranding of CH stations to E!. Local programming was renamed CHCA News as a result of the rebranding.

On February 5, 2009, Canwest announced it would explore "strategic options", including possible sale, for CHCA and its other E! stations, saying "a second conventional TV network is no longer key to the long-term success" of the company.

CHCA ceased to air regular programming in the early morning of August 31, 2009. This slide was the last image to be carried over CHCA. A black screen aired until the transmitters were shut off on September 1, 2009.

On July 22, 2009, Canwest announced it would be closing CHCA as of August 31, 2009 at 5:00am MT, issuing layoff notices to staff. Its final entertainment program was a rerun of Wild On! at 12:30 a.m., followed by a four-hour block of informercials until 5:00 a.m., and then a "goodbye" slide that ran before a black screen that aired all day long until the transmitters were finally shut off, leaving the Red Deer market without a local TV station presence. No satellite providers in the Red Deer area had carried CHCA.

The station was the first major TV station in Canada to have gone dark since 1977, when CFVO-TV in Hull, Quebec left the air (the channel would be reactivated five months later as Radio-Québec outlet CIVO-TV, on a new licence); all other defunct stations in Canada became repeaters of other stations almost seamlessly. Sportscaster Ron MacLean commented that the station's closure was "a sign of the times," but "it wouldn't surprise me somewhere down the road if it starts up again." CKX-TV, a CBC affiliate in Brandon, Manitoba would follow, closing approximately one month later on October 2, 2009. The neighbouring CTV 2 Alberta stations CIAN-TV 13 Calgary and CJAL-TV 9 Edmonton were closed down on August 31, 2011 (going to cable-only status), followed two months later by CKXT-DT Toronto.

The CHCA-TV licence was revoked on December 16, 2009.

== News ==
The station aired local newscasts at 5 and 5:30 p.m. and 11 p.m. Monday to Friday, and until September 2008 aired newscasts on the weekends. This change coincided with Global Edmonton remotely taking control of the station's production. The news set surrounding the on-air talent was digitally created, similar to a weather anchor's green screen set up.

- CHCA News at 5:00, 5:30 and 11:00
  - Jennifer Ivanov
  - Suzy Burge (Weather)
  - Slav Kornik (Sports)
- Reporters
  - Tanara McLean
  - Tino Makris
  - Nicole Weisberg
  - Courtney Ketchen

== Former Transmitters ==
=== CBC era ===
The translator in Coronation, formerly CKRD-TV-1 on channel 10, later moved to channel 13, broadcasting the Edmonton CBXT signal since the 2005 disaffiliation from CBC; this translator would go dark on July 31, 2012, due to financial measures imposed by the CBC. The station also had a translator on channel 10 in Banff, which has since gone dark.

=== CH/E! era ===
Station	City of licence	Channel	ERP	HAAT	Transmitter Coordinates
CHCA-TV-1	Calgary	44 (UHF)	79 kW	206 m	51°3′34″N 114°10′13″W
CHCA-TV-2	Edmonton	17 (UHF)	92 kW	232 m	53°27′49″N 113°20′11″W

== Alumni ==
- Dean Millard (at CFRN TSN Edmonton)
- Heath Brown (at CTV Calgary)
- Nancy Carlson (at Global Edmonton)
- Barry Delay (at Global BC)
- Mike Dennis
- Reid Fiest (was at Global Calgary)
- Dianne Finstad (at CKGY-FM Red Deer)
- Todd Gallant (Digital Advertising, Founder, BizBOXTV)
- Rob Gibson (at Shaw Calgary)
- Erin Harrison (at Global Edmonton)
- Barb Higgins
- Carolyn Jarvis (16:9)
- Tino Markis (at Global Maritimes)
- Daniel Moore (at Citytv Calgary)
- Tara Nelson (at CTV Calgary)
- Leslie Horton (at Global Calgary)
- Jennifer Ivanov (at Global Edmonton)
- Slav Kornik (at Global Edmonton)
- Michael Kuss (at Citytv Toronto)
- Ron MacLean (CBC Sports, Hockey Night in Canada)
- Jill Morgan (at Global Regina)
- Michelle Murphy (last at CTV Calgary. Left in 1994 after developing a brain tumor, died in 2005)
- Kevin O'Connel (at Global Edmonton)
- Andrew Schultz (at Citytv Calgary)
- Kim Scoular (Freelance)
- Lorne Starko (deceased)
- Bindu Suri (at Global Calgary)
- Ron Thornton (at Speedwaymedia.com)
- Gill Tucker (at Global Calgary)
- Nicole Weisberg (at Global Maritimes)
- Brienne Glass (at Global Calgary)
- Dean Molberg (at Fan 960 Calgary)
- Robert Howes (eventually became Vice President, Operations and Engineering at WTN London)
- Peter Wunstorf, ASC

== Digital television and high definition ==
As of its closure on August 31, 2009, CHCA-DT never signed on the air.

CHCA-DT was allocated channel 28 for Red Deer, while its Edmonton and Calgary repeaters converted to digital as a flash-cut. Following the station's closedown and licence revocation, the allocations for its analog and digital frequencies became open for future stations. Should a new television station open up in Red Deer in the future, it would not be required to operate as a digital station, as Red Deer is not a mandatory market for digital conversion, which took place in most other markets on August 31, 2011.
