= Edmonton City Centre =

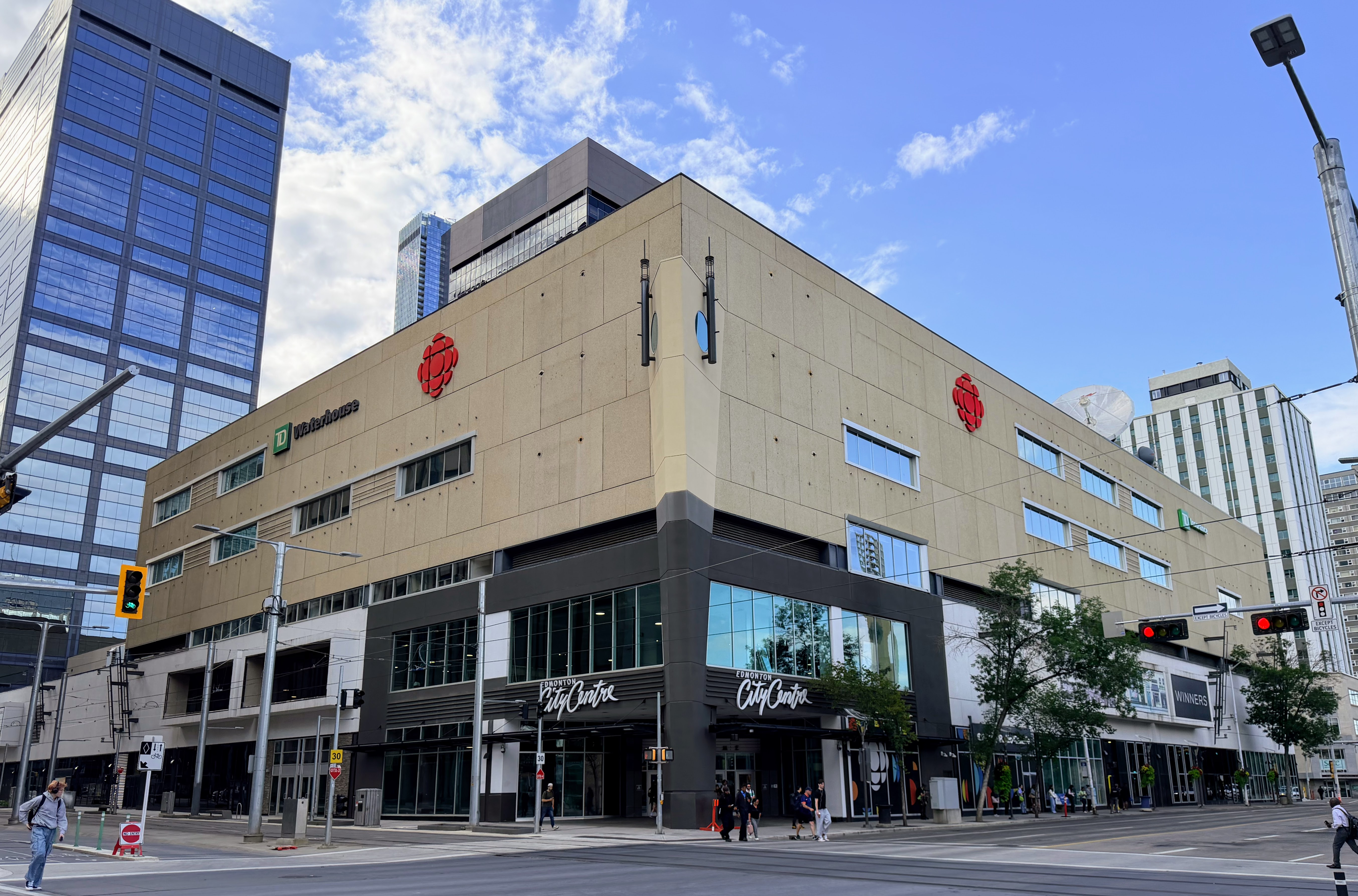
- Edmonton City Centre in August 2026
- Location: Edmonton, Alberta, Canada
- Coordinates: 53°32′37″N 113°29′30″W
- Opened: Edmonton Centre: May 1, 1974; Eaton Centre: August 19, 1987; Edmonton City Centre: 1999
- Developer: Oxford Properties (Edmonton Centre, east), Eaton's and the Triple Five Group (Eaton Centre, west)
- Manager: Olympia Trencevski
- Owner: Westrich Pacific (pending closing late 2026)
- Num. of stores: 170
- Num. of anchor tenants: 4
- Floor area: 75,450.5 m^{2} (812,142 sq ft)
- Floors: 4
- Public transit: 102 Street station
- Website: edmontoncitycentre.com

Edmonton City Centre is a multi-structure retail and office complex in the downtown core of Edmonton, Alberta, Canada, extending west from Churchill Square. The complex developed from two formerly separate shopping centres on opposite sides of 101 Street: Edmonton Centre, whose first phase opened east of 101 Street on May 1, 1974, and Eaton Centre, which opened west of 101 Street on August 19, 1987. Following the closure of Eaton's in 1999, the two centres were redeveloped as the present Edmonton City Centre complex.

== History ==
=== Edmonton Centre ===
The eastern portion of the present complex developed around the downtown Woodward's department store. Woodward's opened its original Edmonton store on October 15, 1926, at the northeast corner of 102 Avenue and 101 Street, on a block where the company had assembled property east of 101 Street. In May 1967, Woodward's announced plans for a $35-million Edmonton Centre redevelopment that would include a new department store and office tower.

By 1974, Edmonton Centre encompassed two downtown blocks between 100 and 101 Streets and 102 and 102A Avenues. The partners in the project were Oxford Development Group Ltd., Woodward Stores Limited, and the Toronto-Dominion Bank.

The $40-million first phase of Edmonton Centre opened to the public at 9:30 a.m. on May 1, 1974, following an official opening ceremony for invited guests the previous evening. Phase I included a new six-floor Woodward's department store on the eastern portion of the site, the Royal Trust Tower (now 102A Tower), the first portions of the three-level shopping concourse, and parking and service facilities. The opening of the new Woodward's store was accompanied by approximately 50 other retailers in the shopping centre. The new Woodward's occupied approximately 400,000 sq ft (37,000 m^{2}).

The original Woodward's store closed in May 1974. When the first phase of Edmonton Centre opened, the old store was still standing at the southwest corner of the development. Its demolition was scheduled to begin on May 22, marking the beginning of Phase II. The second phase was planned to complete the shopping centre with a three-storey garden court and approximately 30 additional stores, with an opening targeted for September 1975.

The Royal Trust Tower opened as part of the first phase and provided 20 floors of office space. Toronto-Dominion Tower was under construction at the time and was projected to be ready for occupancy in June 1976. It was completed in 1976. In 1978, the original Oxford Tower (later 101 Street Tower, now MNP Tower) and the Four Seasons Hotel (now Sandman Signature Edmonton) were added on the north side of the development.

=== Eaton Centre and consolidation ===
Across 101 Street to the west, a separate redevelopment was undertaken by Eaton's and the Triple Five Group. The original plan for what became Eaton Centre, announced in 1980, called for several large office and apartment towers. Although the planned towers were not constructed, the multi-level Eaton Centre shopping complex and Delta Edmonton Centre Suite Hotel proceeded.

The first phase of Eaton Centre opened for business on August 19, 1987, with grand opening ceremonies held that morning at 102 Street and 102 Avenue. A second phase was planned to replace the adjoining older Eaton's store. Edmonton Centre and Eaton Centre initially operated as separate shopping centres on the east and west sides of 101 Street, respectively.

Following the demise of Eaton's in 1999, the two centres were redeveloped as a single shopping complex under the Edmonton City Centre name. A newer and larger pedestrian bridge spanning 101 Street connected the two sides and incorporated additional retail space.

=== Woodward's, The Bay, and Centre Point Place ===
After the Hudson's Bay Company acquired Woodward's in 1993, The Bay took over the former Woodward's store of Edmonton Centre in mid-August. The Bay occupied the former Woodward's premises from 1993 until May 2002, when it relocated across 101 Street to the former Eaton's store on the west side of the consolidated complex.

Portions of the former Woodward's space were subsequently converted to office use as Centre Point Place. By November 2003, CBC Edmonton was scheduled to move its English- and French-language radio and television operations into a new 38,700 sq ft (3,600 m^{2}) digital broadcast facility at Edmonton City Centre.

=== Later redevelopment ===
On June 27, 2013, Empire Theatres announced that it would sell its Edmonton City Centre theatre along with 22 other locations in Western Canada and Ontario to Landmark Cinemas. Empire Theatres closed the location on October 29, 2013, and it reopened as Landmark Cinemas on October 31.

On November 18, 2015, Edmonton City Centre announced a $41.3-million redevelopment that included relocating and significantly upgrading its food court. Construction began in November 2015. The new food court opened on November 1, 2016, and the overall revitalization was scheduled for completion by November 2017. The former lower-level food court and retail space were converted to parking.

In November 2019, Oxford Properties sold the 1.4-million-square-foot Edmonton City Centre office and retail complex to a joint venture comprising LaSalle Investment Management, Bayerische Versorgungskammer (BVK), North American Development Group (NADG), and Canderel. Canderel entities, including Humford Management, assumed property management and leasing responsibilities for the office and non-retail components.

Hudson's Bay closed its Edmonton City Centre store on June 3, 2021, ending the presence of a traditional department store in the complex. Sport Chek closed on March 12, 2023, leaving Winners and Landmark Cinemas as its two remaining main anchors, along with smaller anchors including Shoppers Drug Mart and Dollarama.

McDonald's closed on November 16, 2023.

=== Receivership and sale ===
In July 2025, mortgage lender Otéra Capital, a subsidiary of CDPQ, placed Edmonton City Centre into court-ordered receivership after the ownership group defaulted on nearly $140 million in debt obligations, with PwC appointed as receiver.

On August 7, 2026, an Alberta Court of King's Bench justice approved the court-ordered sale of the entire 1.4-million-square-foot complex—including the mall, TD Tower, 102A Tower, Centre Point Place, and three parkades—to Edmonton-based developer Westrich Pacific, with the transaction scheduled to close by late 2026. Westrich Pacific announced plans for a multi-phase redevelopment beginning with approximately 1,500 residential units in space formerly occupied by Hudson's Bay, along with street-facing retail, an updated exterior, and a rooftop Nordic spa. Construction is slated to begin in early 2027.

== Gallery ==
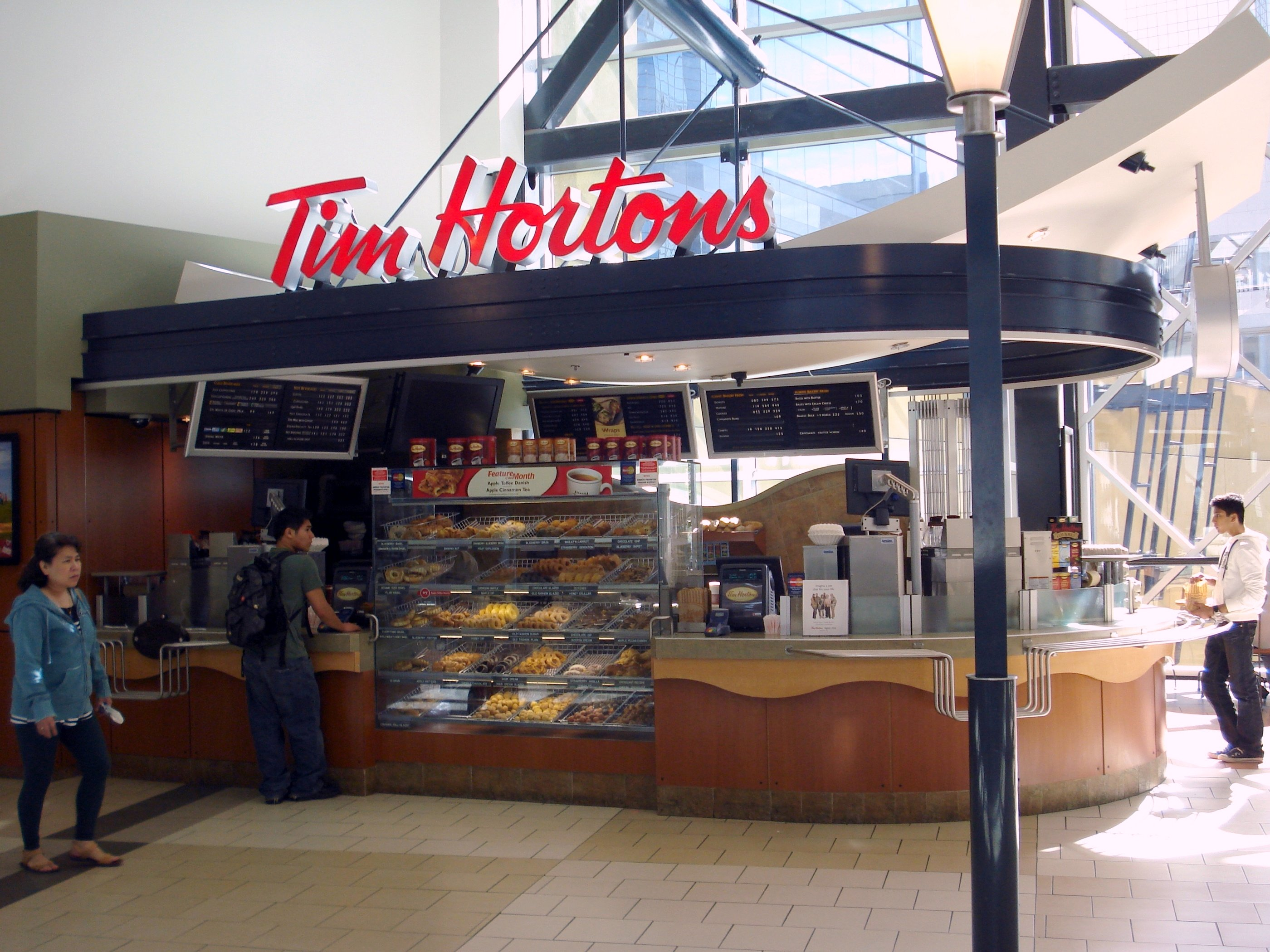
The mall's Tim Hortons in 2007

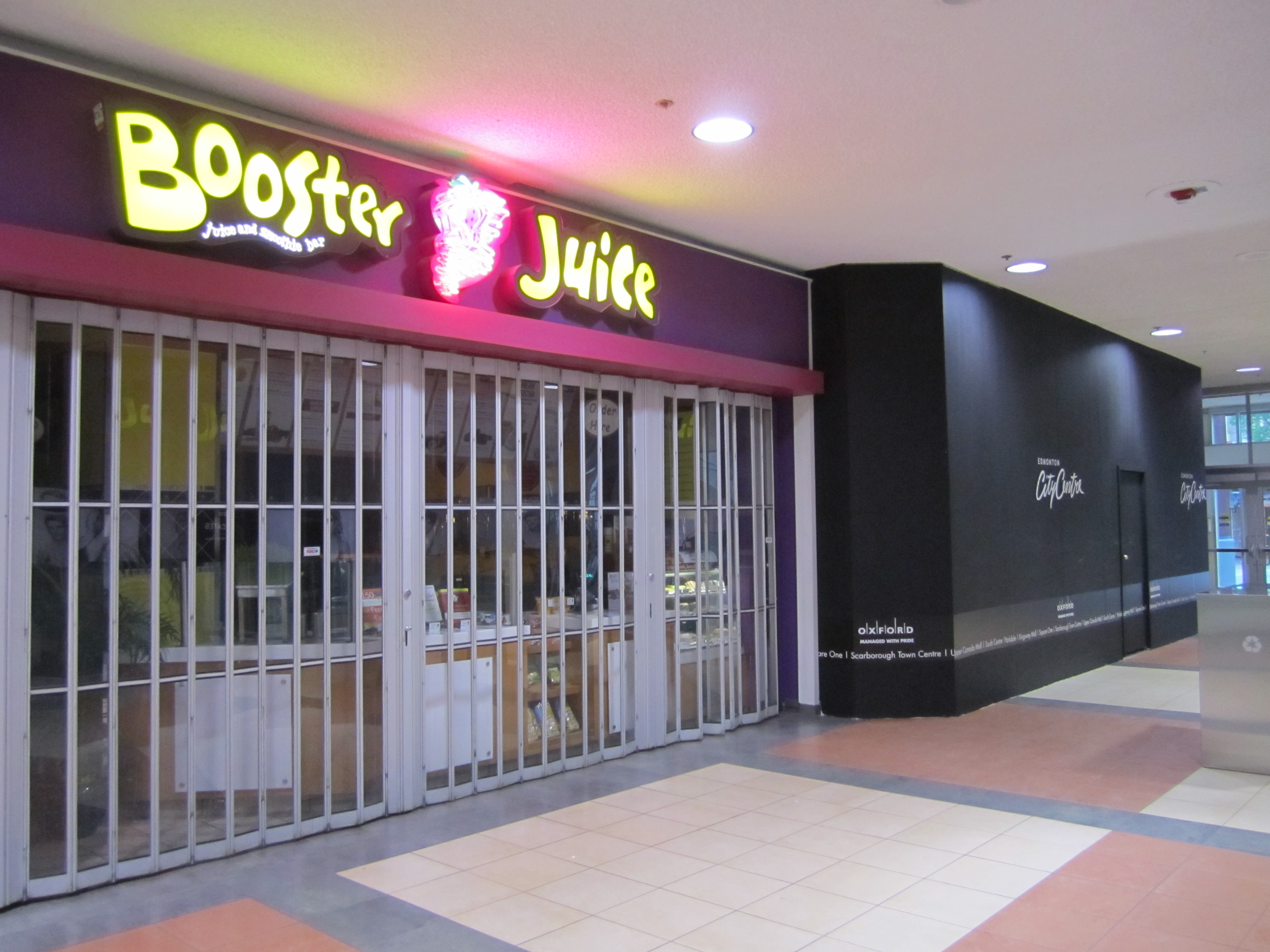
The mall's Booster Juice (after hours) in 2011

== Business ==
Edmonton City Centre includes two office towers, TD Tower and 102A Tower, as well as Centre Point Place, an office conversion occupying part of the former Woodward's department store. The office properties are integrated with the shopping centre and connected to surrounding downtown buildings and transit facilities through the Edmonton Pedway network.

== CBC ==
The Canadian Broadcasting Corporation's English- and French-language services in Edmonton are based at Edmonton City Centre. CBC operations at the complex include television stations CBXT-DT and CBXFT-DT, as well as radio stations CBX, CBX-FM, and CHFA-FM.

== See also ==
- Eaton Centre
- West Edmonton Mall
