= CBX-FM =

Radio station in Edmonton, Alberta, Canada

- Edmonton, Alberta; Canada
- Broadcast area: Edmonton Metropolitan Region
- Frequency: 90.9 MHz

Programming
- Format: Adult contemporary/Public music
- Network: CBC Music

Ownership
- Owner: Canadian Broadcasting Corporation
- Sister stations: CBX, CHFA-FM, CBCX-FM, CBXT-DT, CBXFT-DT

History
- First air date: June 27, 1979
- Call sign meaning: CBC plus X (used for Edmonton)

Technical information
- Class: C
- ERP: 100 kW
- HAAT: 193 metres (633 ft)
- Transmitter coordinates: 53°30′48″N 113°17′5″W

Links
- Website: CBC Edmonton

CBX-FM is a Canadian radio station, broadcasting at 90.9 FM in Edmonton, Alberta. It broadcasts the programming of the CBC Music network.

CBX-FM was launched on June 27, 1979. In 2004, CBC Edmonton operations moved into a new digital broadcast facility downtown, bringing all Radio and TV operations under one roof. The old TV facility on 75th Street had 70,000 square feet (6,500 m^{2}), while the Radio building on 51st Ave. had 48,000 square feet (4,500 m^{2}). The new combined facility has 38,700 total square feet. It is located in the Edmonton City Centre, near Winston Churchill Square. Its transmitter is located in Sherwood Park.

As of February 28, 2021, CBX-FM is the 16th-most-listened-to radio station in the Edmonton market according to a PPM data report released by Numeris.
