= CBR-FM =

CBC Music station in Calgary

- Calgary, Alberta; Canada
- Broadcast area: Calgary Metropolitan Region; Lethbridge County; Red Deer County
- Frequency: 102.1 MHz
- Branding: CBC Music

Programming
- Format: Adult contemporary; Public music

Ownership
- Owner: Canadian Broadcasting Corporation
- Sister stations: CBR, CBCX-FM, CBRT-DT

History
- First air date: September 29, 1975
- Call sign meaning: Canadian Broadcasting Corporation Calgary (R)

Technical information
- Licensing authority: CRTC
- Class: C
- ERP: 100,000 watts
- HAAT: 302.5 metres (992 ft)
- Transmitter coordinates: 51.049°N 114.098°W

Links
- Website: cbc.ca/calgary

CBR-FM (102.1 FM) is a radio station licensed to Calgary, Alberta, Canada, broadcasting the programming of the CBC Music network. CBR-FM's studios are located on Westmount Boulevard Northwest just west of downtown Calgary, while its transmitter is located at 85th Street Southwest and Old Banff Coach Road in western Calgary. CBR-FM was launched on September 29, 1975.

The jazz program Tonic, hosted by Tim Tamashiro, originated from CBR-FM. It previously hosted only the weekend version until the retirement of Montreal-based weekday host Katie Malloch in 2012.

As of Winter 2020, CBR-FM is the 14th-most-listened-to radio station in the Calgary market according to a PPM data report released by Numeris.

== Rebroadcasters ==
Rebroadcasters of CBR-FM
City of licence	Identifier	Frequency	RECNet	CRTC Decision	Notes
Lethbridge	CBBC-FM	91.7 FM	Query		49°44′9.96″N 112°48′14.40″W
Red Deer	CBR-FM-1	99.9 FM	Query	2004-116	52°18′48.96″N 113°57′32.40″W
