= CBRT-DT =

Television station in Calgary

- Calgary, Alberta; Canada
- Channels: Digital: 21 (UHF); Virtual: 9
- Branding: CBC Calgary

Programming
- Affiliations: 9.1: CBC Television

Ownership
- Owner: Canadian Broadcasting Corporation
- Sister stations: CBR (AM), CBR-FM, CBXFT-DT

History
- First air date: September 1, 1975
- Former call signs: CBRT (1975–2011)
- Former channel numbers: Analog: 9 (VHF, 1975–2011)
- Call sign meaning: CBC Calgary Television

Technical information
- Licensing authority: CRTC
- ERP: 23.5 kW
- HAAT: 276.3 m (906 ft)
- Transmitter coordinates: 51°3′53″N 114°12′51″W

Links
- Website: CBC Calgary

CBRT-DT (channel 9, cable channel 6) is a CBC Television station in Calgary, Alberta, Canada. The station's studios are located in the Cambrian Wellness Centre in the Parkdale neighbourhood, and its transmitter is located near Old Banff Coach Road/Highway 563 and 85 Street on the city's southwest side.

== History ==
CBRT first signed on the air at 6 p.m. on September 1, 1975. Before then, CBC programming had aired on private affiliate CFAC-TV (channel 2, now CICT), making Calgary the largest market in Canada without a CBC owned-and-operated station of its own. The station initially branded as "CBC 9" or "CBC Calgary", later branding as "CBRT", then returning to "CBC 9" by 1982. CBRT was one of the first, if not the first, to use the network/channel number branding in North America that has become commonplace in the United States since the mid-1990s.

Up until 2008, CBRT's Calgary studios were used by the 24-hour news channel CBC Newsworld as a production centre for programs including Newsworld Today, Your Call, and a Newsworld edition of Canada Now.

In January 2016, the CBC announced that its Calgary operations would move from their long-time home on Westmount Boulevard to a new, smaller facility at the Cambrian Wellness Centre near Foothills Hospital. The CBC cited the age of the facility, and its opinion that it was too large for its current operation, as justification for the re-location. The move was completed in October 2017.

== News programming ==
As of October 5, 2015, CBRT airs over 11 hours a week of local news programming. On weekdays, CBC Calgary News broadcasts six 1-minute news updates at :59 past the hour from 2 to 10 p.m. A thirty-minute evening news magazine airs at 6 p.m., and a late evening newscast is shown at 11 p.m., following The National. On weekends, CBC Alberta News, originating from CBC Edmonton (CBXT), is broadcast on Saturday evenings after Hockey Night in Canada, and at 11 p.m. on Sunday evenings. However, since the beginning of the COVID-19 pandemic, CBC Alberta News has been put on hiatus and replaced with entertainment programming on Saturday evenings, and a rebroadcast of The National on Sunday nights.

CBRT also simulcasts CBC Radio One's local morning news and current affairs program, The Calgary Eyeopener, from 6 to 7 a.m. weekdays.

The station also produces Our Calgary, a thirty-minute weekly local current affairs program on Saturdays at 10 a.m. and repeated on Sundays at 1 p.m..

CBC Calgary's first supper-hour newscast on CBRT was named Evening Eye-Opener and later, The CBC Evening News. The original late-night news was called Night Final. In 1991, the CBC cancelled the local newscast on CBRT due to corporate budget cuts and began producing a provincial newscast, CBC Alberta News, co-produced and presented from Calgary and CBXT-DT in Edmonton. Following a sharp drop in ratings, localized newscasts from Calgary were restored in 1997.

The local supper-hour programs were cut to 30 minutes in length in 2000 with the launch of a national and international news program, Canada Now from Vancouver. Seven years later, the sole Calgary newscast returned to its hour-long format under the umbrella title of CBC News at Six.

=== Notable current on-air staff ===
- Rob Brown – anchor

== Technical information ==
=== Subchannel ===
Subchannel of CBRT-DT
Subchannel	Res.	Short name	Programming
9.1	720p	CBRT-DT	CBC Television

=== Analog-to-digital conversion ===
On April 1, 2011, CBRT began broadcasting its digital signal on channel 21. On August 31, 2011, when Canadian television stations in CRTC-designated mandatory markets transitioned from analog to digital broadcasts, the station's digital signal remained on UHF channel 21, using virtual channel 9.

=== Transmitters ===
CBRT operated 16 analog television rebroadcasters in certain Southern Alberta communities such as Lethbridge. Due to federal funding reductions to the CBC, in April 2012, the CBC responded with substantial budget cuts, which included shutting down CBC's and Radio-Canada's remaining analog transmitters on July 31, 2012.

CBRT-6 in Lethbridge, a mandatory market, was required to go digital or be taken off the air by the transition deadline of August 31, 2011. CBC had originally decided that none of its rebroadcasters will transition to digital. On August 16, 2011, the Canadian Radio-television and Telecommunications Commission (CRTC) granted the CBC permission to continue operating 22 repeaters in mandatory markets, including CBRT-6, in analog until August 31, 2012, at which point the transmitters had to be converted to digital or shut down.
