= CFDV-FM =

Radio station in Red Deer, Alberta

- Red Deer, Alberta; Canada
- Broadcast area: Red Deer County
- Frequency: 106.7 MHz
- Branding: 106.7 Rewind Radio

Programming
- Language: English
- Format: Classic hits

Ownership
- Owner: Jim Pattison Group
- Sister stations: CHUB-FM

History
- First air date: 2005
- Call sign meaning: Station branded as The Drive

Technical information
- Class: C1
- ERP: 51,000 watts vertical 100,000 watts horizontal
- HAAT: 224.1 metres (735 ft)
- Transmitter coordinates: 52.246°N 113.810°W

Links
- Webcast: Listen Live
- Website: 1067rewindradio.ca

CFDV-FM (106.7 MHz, 106.7 Rewind Radio), is a Canadian radio station in Red Deer, Alberta. Owned by Jim Pattison Group, the station broadcasts a classic hits format.

== History ==
The station was licensed by the Canadian Radio-television and Telecommunications Commission (CRTC) in 2004 and was launched on November 6, 2005 as 106.7 The Drive with an active rock format playing a mixture of alternative and classic rock.

On December 4, 2020, the station flipped to classic hits and rebranded as 106.7 Rewind Radio.
