= 102A Tower =

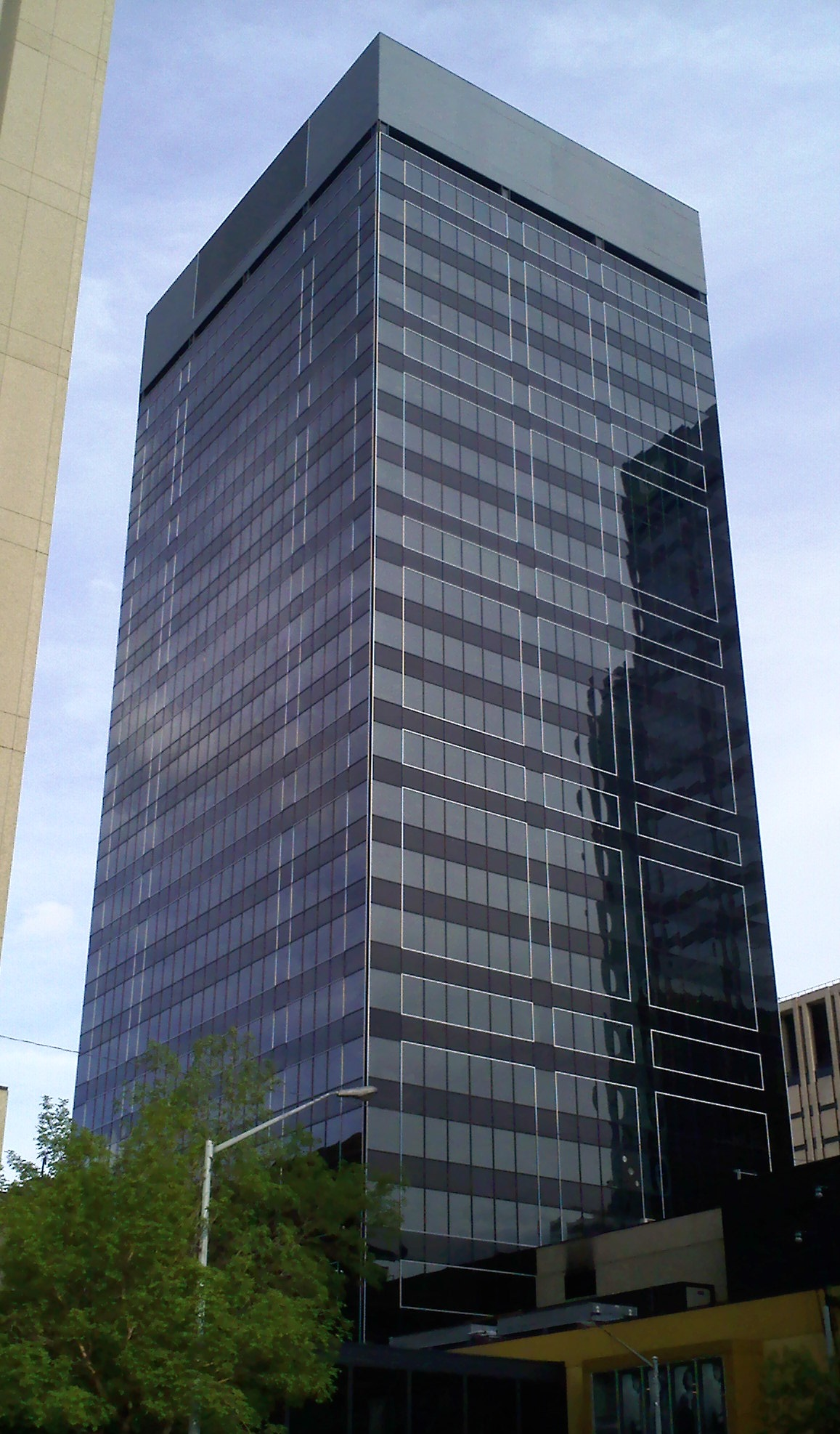

- Location within Edmonton
- Former names: Oxford Tower; City Centre Place; Merrill Lynch Tower; Midland Walwyn Tower; Royal Trust Tower

General information
- Status: Under contract for sale
- Type: Office
- Location: 10025 102A Avenue NW; Edmonton, Alberta, Canada
- Coordinates: 53°32′39″N 113°29′33″W
- Construction started: 1972
- Completed: 1974
- Opening: May 1, 1974
- Owner: Westrich Pacific (pending sale closing late 2026)
- Operator: Canderel (Humford Management)

Height
- Roof: 102.89 m (337.6 ft)

Technical details
- Floor count: 23
- Floor area: 244,945 sq ft (22,756.1 m^{2})
- Lifts/elevators: 8

Design and construction
- Architect: Skidmore, Owings & Merrill LLP

102A Tower (originally Royal Trust Tower and later known as Midland Walwyn Tower, Merrill Lynch Tower, City Centre Place, and Oxford Tower) is a 23-storey office tower in downtown Edmonton, Alberta, Canada. Standing at 102.89 metres (337.6 ft) tall, it forms part of the Edmonton City Centre complex. Completed in 1974, the building was designed by the architecture firm Skidmore, Owings & Merrill.

== History ==
The tower opened on May 1, 1974, as Royal Trust Tower, as part of the first phase of Edmonton Centre. Contemporary coverage described Royal Trust Tower as the development's first office tower. In January 1995, after investment brokerage Midland Walwyn replaced Royal Trust as the building's largest single tenant, the building was renamed Midland Walwyn Tower. Following the 1998 acquisition and merger of Midland Walwyn into Merrill Lynch, the building became known as Merrill Lynch Tower. By May 2008, the building had been renamed City Centre Place. In late 2013 or early 2014, it was renamed Oxford Tower.

In November 2019, Oxford Properties sold the entire 1.4-million-square-foot Edmonton City Centre complex - including Oxford Tower, TD Tower, Centre Point Place, and the retail shopping centre - to a joint venture consisting of LaSalle Investment Management (via the LaSalle Canada Property Fund), Bayerische Versorgungskammer (BVK), North American Development Group (NADG), and Canderel, operating under Edmonton City Centre Inc. Following the transaction, office management was assumed by Canderel (via Humford Management), and the tower was officially renamed 102A Tower.

In July 2025, Otéra Capital (a subsidiary of CDPQ) placed the Edmonton City Centre complex, including 102A Tower, into court-ordered receivership following a default on over $140 million in debt obligations.

In August 2026, an Alberta Court of King's Bench justice approved the court-ordered sale of the complex to Edmonton-based developer Westrich Pacific, with the transaction scheduled to close by the end of 2026.

== Specifications ==
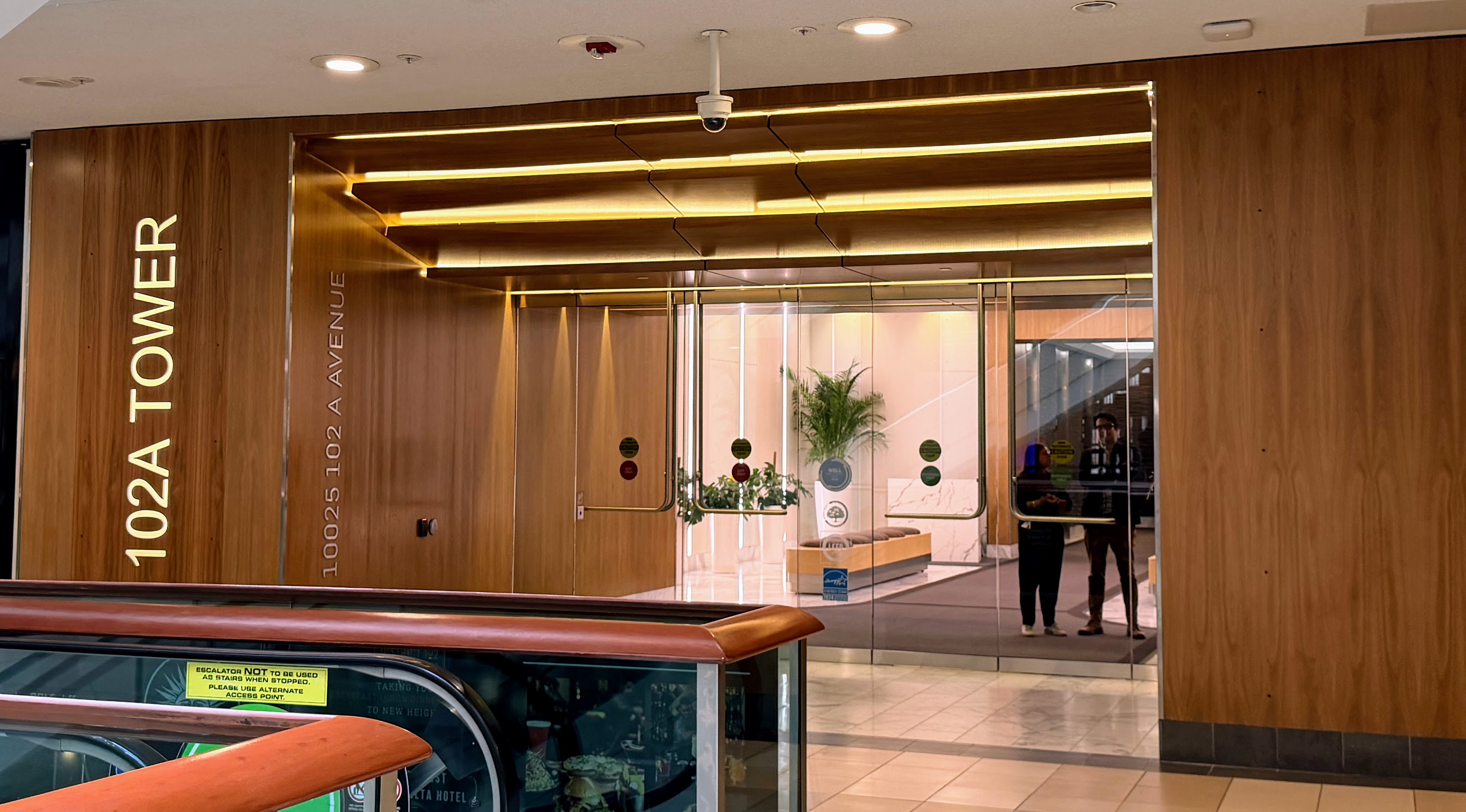
Entrance to 102A Tower from the street level of Edmonton City Centre, August 2026.

102A Tower contains approximately 244,945 square feet (22,756 m^{2}) of gross office space across 23 storeys, with a typical floor plate size of 11,825 square feet (1,098.6 m^{2}). The building features eight passenger elevators and direct indoor pedway connections to Edmonton City Centre Mall.

== See also ==
- Edmonton City Centre
- List of tallest buildings in Edmonton
