= CBX (AM) =

CBC Radio One station in Alberta, Canada

- Edmonton, Alberta; Canada
- Broadcast area: Northern Alberta
- Frequency: 740 kHz

Programming
- Format: Public radio and talk
- Network: CBC Radio One

Ownership
- Owner: Canadian Broadcasting Corporation
- Sister stations: CBX-FM, CHFA-FM, CBXT-DT, CBXFT-DT

History
- First air date: September 8, 1948
- Former frequencies: 1010 kHz (1948–1964)
- Call sign meaning: Canadian Broadcasting Corporation X

Technical information
- Licensing authority: CRTC
- Class: B
- Power: 50,000 watts
- Transmitter coordinates: 53°19′10″N 113°26′43″W

Links
- Website: CBC Edmonton

CBX is a Canadian radio station, broadcasting at 740 kHz (AM) in Edmonton, Alberta. It broadcasts the programming of the CBC Radio One network. CBX is a Class B station broadcasting on a Canadian clear-channel frequency; the dominant station on 740 AM is CFZM in Toronto, Ontario. CBX's studios are located at Edmonton City Centre on 102nd Avenue Northwest in downtown Edmonton, while its transmitters are located near Beaumont.

As of Feb 28, 2021, CBX is the 3rd-most-listened-to radio station in the Edmonton market according to a PPM data report released by Numeris.

== History ==
CBX started broadcasting September 8, 1948, on a frequency of 1010 kHz. It was the third of three 50,000-watt Trans-Canada Network AM radio stations to sign on in the Prairie Provinces (the others being CBK in Saskatchewan and CBW in Manitoba). Prior to CBX's launch, Trans-Canada Network programming aired on commercial radio stations in Edmonton, namely CJCA, which continued to air CBC programming on a secondary basis after CBX signed on.

Although CBX's initial studios were located inside the Hotel Macdonald in Edmonton, the station's transmitter was located near Lacombe, roughly halfway between Edmonton and Calgary, in an attempt to serve the southern two-thirds of Alberta from a single transmitter.

While the CBC had served most of Manitoba and Saskatchewan from single transmitters, it met with far less succsss doing so in Alberta. From the start, the CBX signal did not adequately cover either Edmonton or Calgary. To rectify this problem within Edmonton, a 250-watt "nested" rebroadcaster operating on 740 kHz was launched in the city in 1953. This rebroadcaster had the call sign CBXA.

Meanwhile, reception continued to be poor in Calgary. As early as 1956, the CBC began considering separate stations for Edmonton and Calgary. In order to provide a long-term solution to the station's reception issues, in 1964, the CBC launched separate radio stations for Calgary and Edmonton while also decommissioning the original CBX transmitter. Under the new setup, CBX was reoriented to be Edmonton's CBC station and took over CBXA's frequency of 740 kHz from a newly constructed 50,000-watt transmitting site near Beaumont. At the same time, CBR signed on as Calgary's CBC outlet, using CBX's old frequency of 1010 kHz.

In 2004, CBC Edmonton operations moved into a new digital broadcast facility downtown, bringing all operations of Radio and TV under one roof. The old TV facility on 75th Street had 70,000 square feet (6,500 m^{2}), while the Radio building on 51st Ave. had 48,000 square feet (4,500 m^{2}). The new combined facility has 38,700 total square feet. It is located at the Edmonton City Centre, on Winston Churchill Square.

On March 16, 2006, the Canadian Radio-television and Telecommunications Commission approved the station's application to add a nested FM transmitter at 93.9 MHz in Edmonton to simulcast the AM programming. This relay, CBX-2-FM, officially began April 20, 2007.

== Local programming ==
Local programs produced by CBX include Edmonton AM, and Radio Active. CBX also produces half-hourly news bulletins between 5:30 AM and 6:00 PM each weekday. Provincial or national news bulletins air on CBX outside of those hours.

CBX also produces two music shows for the entire CBC radio networks: Saturday Night Blues and Canada Live air nationally on CBC Radio One/Sirius 137 and CBC Music, respectively.

The last few BBM radio ratings measurements have shown CBX steadily climbing in audience share in Edmonton. As of the spring 2009 BBM measurement, CBX is the second-most listened to radio-station in Edmonton, behind news-talk radio station CHED. Edmonton AM also ranks second in the morning, while Radio Active ranks fourth amongst the afternoon radio drive-time shows.

== Transmitters ==
Rebroadcasters of CBX
City of licence	Identifier	Frequency	Power	RECNet	Notes
Bonnyville	CBX-1-FM	92.9 FM	55,500 watts	Query	54°10′54.84″N 110°51′57.60″W
Chateh	CBXA-FM	103.5 FM	983 watts	Query	58°38′29.04″N 118°40′37.20″W
Edmonton	CBX-2-FM	93.9 FM	3,931 watts	Query	53°32′26.16″N 113°29′52.80″W
Edson	CBXD-FM	95.3 FM	50 watts	Query	53°34′32.16″N 116°26′13.20″W
Fort McMurray	CBXN-FM	99.3 FM	20,000 watts	Query	56°48′29.16″N 111°26′56.40″W
Fort Vermilion	CBXF-FM	105.1 FM	50 watts	Query	58°23′3.12″N 116°2′24″W
Fox Creek	CBXV-FM	91.3 FM	38 watts	Query	54°23′44.16″N 116°47′20.40″W
Fox Lake	CBXK-FM	96.9 FM	425 watts	Query	58°27′48.96″N 114°32′45.60″W
Grande Cache	CBXC-FM	92.3 FM	50 watts	Query	53°53′35.16″N 119°7′8.40″W
Grande Prairie	CBXP-FM	102.5 FM	100,000 watts	Query	55°29′20.04″N 118°44′52.80″W
High Level	CBXL-FM	99.5 FM	50 watts	Query	58°30′19.08″N 117°8′13.20″W
Hinton	CBXI-FM	88.1 FM	3,000 watts	Query	53°23′48.84″N 117°42′32.40″W
Jasper	CBXJ-FM	98.1 FM	259 watts	Query	52°52′45.12″N 118°4′33.60″W
John D'Or Prairie	CBXH-FM	102.5 FM	230 watts	Query	58°29′39.84″N 115°9′3.60″W
Manning	CBXM-FM	100.5 FM	13,500 watts	Query	56°42′25.92″N 117°39′21.60″W
Peace River	CBXG-FM	93.9 FM	822 watts	Query	56°9′25.92″N 117°18′50.40″W
Rainbow Lake	CBXW-FM	101.5 FM	50 watts	Query	58°29′36.96″N 119°23′20.40″W
Swan Hills	CBXS-FM	91.5 FM	88 watts	Query	54°44′17.88″N 115°24′36″W

On September 10, 2012, the CBC applied to move the following CBC low-power AM transmitters to FM. The CBC received approval on January 31, 2013, to convert the remaining AM transmitters to FM and the new transmitters will operate on these following frequencies:

- CBXD 1540 to 99.3 with 50 watts (new callsign CBXN-FM)
- CBKC 1460 to 105.1 with 50 watts (new callsign CBXF-FM)
- CBWI 1450 to 92.3 with 50 watts (new callsign CBXC-FM)
- CBKD 1560 to 99.5 with 50 watts (new callsign CBXL-FM, originally approved to move to 88.1 in 1986)
- CBXX 1240 to 101.5 with 50 watts (new callsign CBXW-FM)

On October 25, 2013, the CRTC approved the CBC's application to delete the following low-power AM transmitter, CBXH John D'Or Prairie. An FM transmitter operates at 102.5 as CBXH-FM.

The AM transmitters were deleted once the new FM transmitters commenced operation.
