= CKGY-FM =

Radio station in Red Deer, Alberta

Coordinates: 52°19′10″N 113°40′41″W

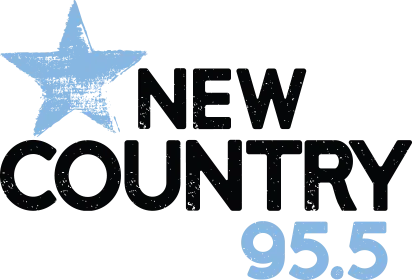
- Red Deer, Alberta; Canada
- Broadcast area: Red Deer County
- Frequency: 95.5 MHz
- Branding: New Country 95.5

Programming
- Format: Country
- Affiliations: Westwood One

Ownership
- Owner: Stingray Group
- Sister stations: CIZZ-FM

History
- First air date: August 1, 1973
- Former frequencies: 1170 kHz (1973–2001)

Technical information
- Class: C1
- ERP: 100,000 watts
- HAAT: 256.5 metres (842 ft)

Links
- Website: newcountryreddeer.ca

CKGY-FM (95.5 MHz) is a radio station located in Red Deer, Alberta. Owned by Stingray Group, it broadcasts a country format branded as New Country 95.5.

CKGY switched to FM in 2001, after broadcasting on the AM frequency 1170 kHz where it had been heard since the early 1970s.

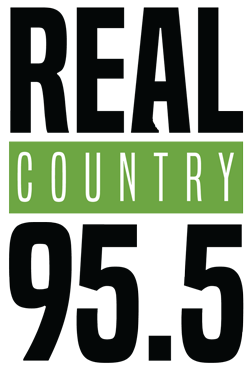
Previous logo

In November 2016, CKGY rebranded from KG Country to the Real Country brand, as with other Newcap-owned country stations in Alberta. In 2019, the station began to syndicate its morning show Vinnie & Randi across 15 other Stingray stations in rural Alberta as part of a regional syndication strategy. The program contains local inserts for each market.

On March 4, 2024, CKGY rebranded as New Country 95.5, as part of another national rebrand of Stingray's country stations.
