= CIZZ-FM =

Radio station in Red Deer, Alberta

- Red Deer, Alberta; Canada
- Broadcast area: Red Deer County
- Frequency: 98.9 MHz
- Branding: Z98.9

Programming
- Format: Classic rock

Ownership
- Owner: Stingray Group
- Sister stations: CKGY-FM

History
- First air date: February 12, 1965
- Former call signs: CKRD-FM (1965–1987)

Technical information
- Licensing authority: CRTC
- Class: C
- ERP: 100,000 watts
- HAAT: 260.5 metres (855 ft)
- Transmitter coordinates: 52°16′44″N 113°48′46″W

Links
- Website: zed989.com

CIZZ-FM (98.9 FM, "Z98.9") is a commercial radio station licensed to Red Deer, Alberta, Canada. Owned by Stingray Group, it broadcasts a classic rock format.

== History ==
CKRD-FM began broadcasting on February 12, 1965, simulcasting its AM counterpart CKRD (now CHUB-FM).

As CKRD-FM, the station was a network affiliate of CBC Stereo from 1977 to 1981.

In April 2021, CIZZ began to serve as the originating station for Rock of the West, a networked evening program airing on Stingray's classic rock stations in Alberta and British Columbia. It is hosted by the station's afternoon host Travis Currah, and modelled after the Rock of the Atlantic program networked by CFRQ-FM.
