= Edmonton Pedway =

Skyway and pedestrian tunnel network in Edmonton, Alberta, Canada

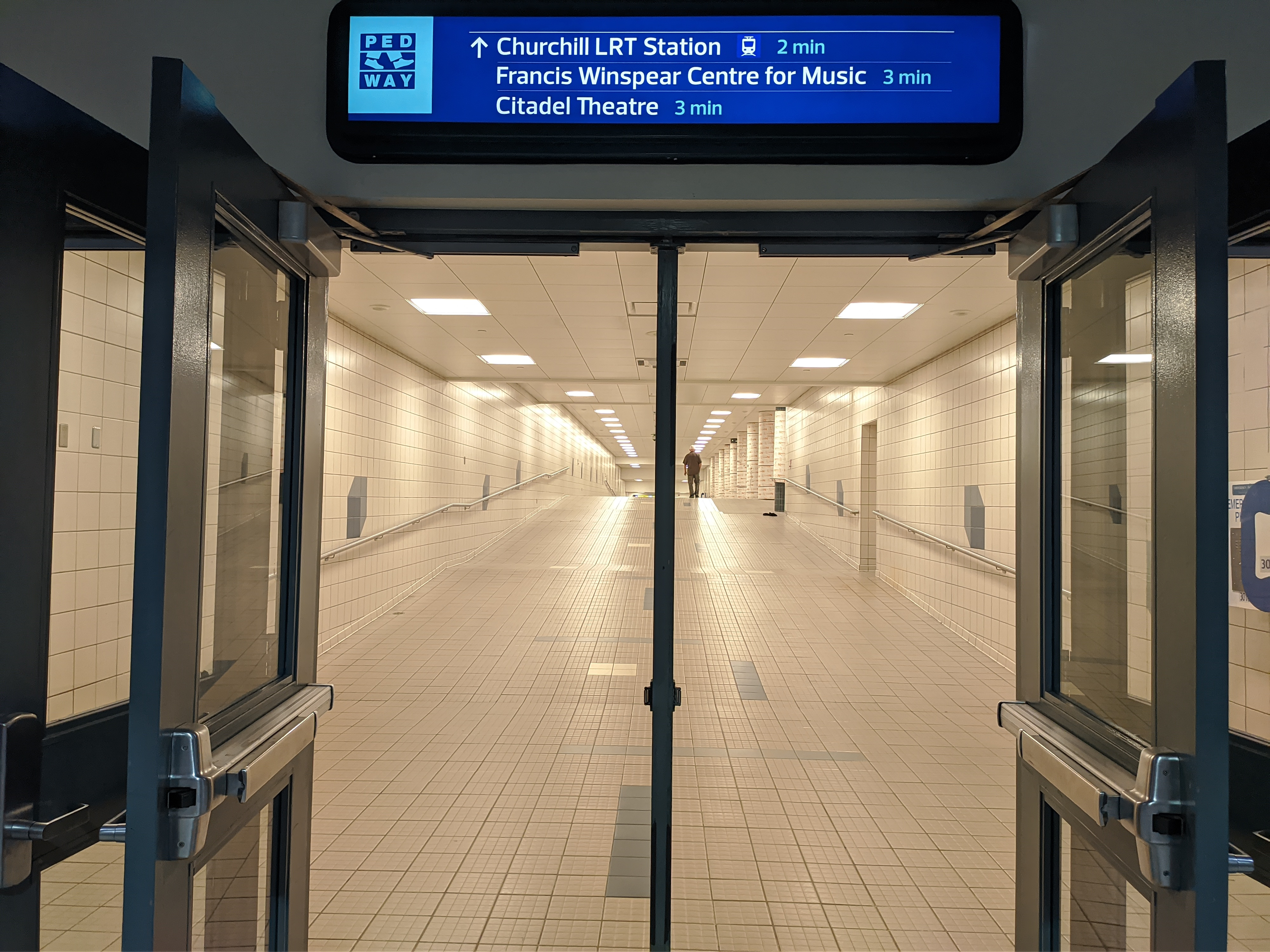
One of the underground tunnels in the Edmonton Pedway system, beneath Churchill Square

The Edmonton Pedway system is a pedestrian network connecting office buildings, shopping centres, and parkades in downtown Edmonton, Alberta, Canada. It consists of approximately 13 kilometres (8.1 mi) of year-round climate-controlled tunnels, and walkways between the second floors of buildings, approximately 4.6 metres (15 ft) above ground. The main network connects more than 40 buildings and parkades, and three of the five Edmonton LRT stations in the downtown area.

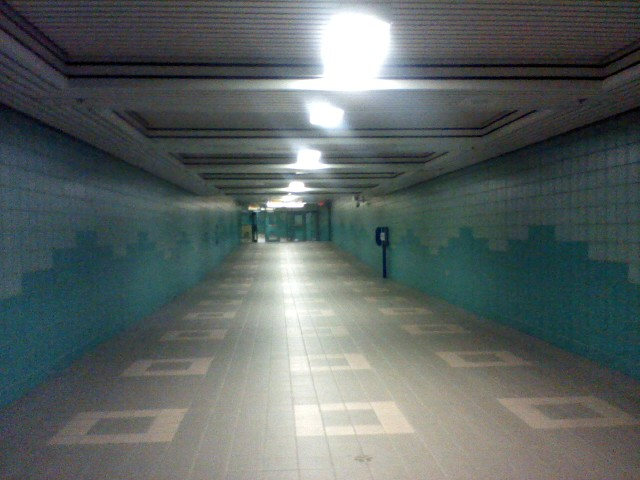
The pedestrian tunnel from Government Centre station to the Alberta Legislature Building.

Throughout the city, there are some independent connections between buildings that are not linked to the wider system, as well as shorter tunnels leading from the surface directly to transit. Notable examples include connections to the Alberta Legislature Buildings that leads to Government Centre station and the Government Centre Transit Centre, and networks connecting buildings at the University of Alberta, MacEwan University, Northern Alberta Institute of Technology, Concordia University of Edmonton, and Edmonton International Airport. MacEwan University and Northern Alberta Institute of Technology are entirely traversable indoors through extensive pedways and building interconnectivity.

== History ==
In 1968, the City of Edmonton approved a pedway concept plan though there was no grand plan for the system. Most pedways in the system were a result from the 1970s building boom as developers worked out agreements to construct pedways to connect their buildings. Labelled as the last link of the system, a pedway connecting Churchill station and Edmonton City Centre temporarily opened from December 14, 1990 to January 2, 1991 for Christmas shopping before it held its official grand opening on February 18, 1991. A pedway connecting Manulife Place to CityCentre and an underground tunnel connecting Royal Bank Building with CityCentre and Central station opened in March and April 1993, respectively.

== Connections ==
The Pedway system is integrated with public transit via climate controlled access to LRT stations.

Linked to Churchill station:

- Revera The Churchill-Active Retirement Living
- Canada Place
- Edmonton Convention Centre
- Citadel Theatre
- Stanley A. Milner Library
- The Westin Edmonton
- Royal Alberta Museum
- Art Gallery of Alberta
- Chancery Hall
- Century Place
- Edmonton City Hall
- Provincial Court of Alberta
- John E Brownlee Building
- Edmonton City Centre (East building)
- Edmonton City Centre East Parkade
- Sandman Signature Edmonton Downtown Hotel
- MNP Tower

Future connections to Churchill station:

- CN Tower
- Epcor Tower
- The Switch Tower

Linked to MacEwan station:

- Bell Tower
- Bell Annex
- Edmonton Tower
- Rogers Place
- Grand Villa Casino
- Edmonton Downtown Community Arena
- JW Marriott Edmonton Ice District & Residences
- Stantec Tower
- Connect Centre

Future connections to MacEwan station:

- Edmonton Event Park

Linked to Central station:

- ATB Place
- Telus House
- Rice Howard Place
- Commerce Place
- National Bank Centre
- Don Wheaton Family YMCA
- Edmonton Journal building
- Edmonton City Centre (West building)
- Edmonton Unlimited Building
- Edmonton Unlimited Parkade

Linked to Bay/Enterprise Square station:

- Canadian Western Bank Place
- Don Wheaton Family YMCA
- 102 Street Centre
- 103 Street Centre
- Enterprise Square

Linked to Government Centre station:

- Alberta Legislature Building
- Alberta Legislature Building grounds
- Queen Elizabeth II Building and Visitor Centre
- Prospect Point
- Government Centre Transit Centre

== See also ==
- Plus 15, a similar skyway network in Calgary
- PATH, a similar underground network in Toronto
