= CBXT-DT =

Television station in Alberta, Canada

Coordinates: 53°30′48″N 113°17′6″W

- Edmonton, Alberta; Canada
- Channels: Digital: 25 (UHF); Virtual: 5
- Branding: 5.1: CBC Edmonton

Programming
- Affiliations: CBC Television

Ownership
- Owner: Canadian Broadcasting Corporation
- Sister stations: CBXFT-DT, CBX (AM), CBX-FM

History
- First air date: October 1, 1961
- Former call signs: CBXT (1961–2011)
- Former channel numbers: Analogue: 5 (VHF, 1961–2011); Digital: 42 (UHF, 2011–2021)
- Call sign meaning: CBC X Television

Technical information
- Licensing authority: CRTC
- ERP: 90.8 kW
- HAAT: 234 m (768 ft)

Links
- Website: CBC Edmonton

CBXT-DT (channel 5, cable channel 4) is a CBC Television station in Edmonton, Alberta, Canada. It is part of a twinstick with Ici Radio-Canada Télé station CBXFT-DT (channel 11). The two stations share studios at the Edmonton City Centre (across from Churchill Square) in Downtown Edmonton; CBXT-DT's transmitter is located on Wye Road in Sherwood Park.

== History ==
The station first went on the air on October 1, 1961, as Edmonton's second television station; the previous CBC affiliate, CFRN (channel 3), switched to the newly established CTV on the same day. Initially, it was branded as "CBXT 5", or "Channel 5". After being known as "Edmonton/5" in the late 1970s, it became known as "XTV" in 1980. It reverted to the "Edmonton 5" brand in the mid-1980s and then, on January 1, 1986, became "CBC Television Edmonton". Its local newscasts were originally known as Metro.

When CBXT signed on, it was the first television station in Canada to use television cameras that could be remotely controlled from a control room, and did not need constant adjustment. In 2004, the CBC's Edmonton operations moved into a new digital broadcast facility downtown, bringing all operations of radio and television, under one roof. The old television facility on 75th Street was 70,000 square feet (6,500 m^{2}), while the radio building on 51st Avenue was 48,000 square feet (4,500 m^{2}). The new combined facility at the Edmonton City Centre totals 38,700 square feet (3,600 m^{2}). At the same time, master control was consolidated with those of CBRT in Calgary into a single facility based at the CBC Studios in Calgary.

When Red Deer's CKRD disaffiliated from CBC Television in 2005 (switching to E!, reverting to its original calls CHCA-TV), CBXT was given control of the transmitter in Coronation, Alberta (CKRD-1) on channel 10. CBXT added a transmitter on channel 22 in Red Deer, broadcasting the full CBXT/CBC schedule to Red Deer and Central Alberta.

== News operation ==
CBXT airs 12 hours of local news programming; in regards to the number of hours devoted to news programming, it has the lowest amount of hours devoted to local newscasts out of any English-language television station in the Edmonton market.

CBC Edmonton News is broadcast live at 6 and 11 p.m. on weekdays from its studios at Edmonton City Centre Mall. Hourly 1-minute summaries at :59 past the hour are also produced by CBC Edmonton, and are broadcast in the afternoons and evenings.

In addition, the station produces a weekend provincial newscast for both CBC stations in Calgary and Edmonton. CBC Alberta News airs at 11:30 p.m. or following Hockey Night in Canada on Saturdays, and at 11 p.m. on Sundays.

The 11 p.m. edition of CBC Edmonton News, and the Saturday and Sunday editions of CBC Alberta News are simulcast on CBC North. Forecasts for Northwest Territories, Nunavut, and Yukon Territory are included in the weather segments.

CBXT also simulcasts Edmonton AM from CBX weekday mornings from 6–7 a.m. The radio program is presented with an enhanced news/weather/traffic ticker alongside live shots of its radio studio.

A weekly current affairs program, Our Edmonton also airs on weekend mornings.

As of May 22, 2017, CBXT began broadcasting all live TV news programming originating from its Edmonton studios using a control room in Toronto. The technical change has enabled the station to produce its local news in high-definition, the fourth and final station in Edmonton to do so.

== Technical information ==
=== Subchannel ===
Subchannel of CBXT-DT
Channel	Res.	Short name	Programming
5.1	720p	CBXT-DT	CBC Television

=== Analog-to-digital conversion ===
On April 1, 2011, CBXT began broadcasting its digital signal on UHF channel 42. On August 31, 2011, when Canadian television stations in CRTC-designated mandatory markets transitioned from analog to digital broadcasts, the station's digital signal remained on UHF channel 42, using virtual channel 5.1. On March 20, 2021, CBXT-DT changed its frequency to channel 25.

=== Transmitters ===
CBXT had nearly 30 rebroadcasters in certain Central and Northern Albertan communities. Due to federal funding reductions to the CBC, in April 2012, the CBC responded with substantial budget cuts, which included shutting down CBC's and Radio-Canada's remaining transmitters on July 31, 2012. None of CBC or Radio-Canada's television rebroadcasters were converted to digital, leaving those areas dependent on cable television to receive CBC Television programming.

==== Former transmitters ====
City of license	Callsign	Channel	ERP
Athabasca	CBXT-1	8	25.7 kW
Battle River	CBXAT-6	9	9 watts
Beaver Lodge	CBXAT-1	4	10 watts
Chateh	CBXAT-7	5	151 watts
Daysland	CBXT-11	40	100 watts
Forestburg	CBXT-12	52	29 watts
Fort Chipewyan	CBXBT	10	9 watts
Fort McMurray	CBXT-6	9	6 watts
Fort Vermilion	CBXAT-5	11	5 watts
Fox Creek	CBXT-7	5	10 watts
Fox Lake	CBXAT-10	9	10 watts
Grande Prairie	CBXAT	10	36 watts
High Level	CBXAT-4	8	468 watts
High Prairie	CBXAT-2	2	6 watts
Hinton	CBXT-3	8	350 watts
Jasper	CBXT-4	5	9 watts
Jean D'or Prairie	CBXAT-9	13	28 watts
Lac La Biche	CBXT-5	10	825 watts
Manning	CBXAT-3	12	2 watts
Peace River	CBXAT-1	7	4,800 watts
Plamondon	CBXT-8	4	10 watts
Rainbow Lake	CBXAT-8	11	9 watts
Slave Lake	CBXAT-11	11	672 watts
Wabasca	CBXAT-12	7	10 watts
Whitecourt	CBXT-2	9	9,400 watts
