= CHUB-FM =

Radio station in Red Deer, Alberta

- Red Deer, Alberta; Canada
- Broadcast area: Red Deer County
- Frequency: 105.5 MHz
- Branding: BIG 105

Programming
- Language: English
- Format: Hot adult contemporary

Ownership
- Owner: Jim Pattison Group
- Sister stations: CFDV-FM

History
- First air date: April 30, 1949
- Former call signs: CKRD (1949–2000)
- Former frequencies: 1230 kHz (1949–1954); 850 kHz (1954–1985); 700 kHz (1985–2000)

Technical information
- Class: C1
- ERP: 100,000 watts
- HAAT: 224 metres (735 ft)
- Transmitter coordinates: 52.275°N 113.691°W

Links
- Webcast: Listen Live
- Website: big105.fm

CHUB-FM (105.5 FM, BIG 105) is a radio station in Red Deer, Alberta. Owned by the Jim Pattison Group, it broadcasts a hot adult contemporary format.

== History ==
The station originally began broadcasting as CKRD at 1230 kHz/AM in 1949. In 1954, CKRD moved from 1230 to 850 AM and moved to its last AM frequency at 700 AM in 1985, until it moved to its current FM frequency at 105.5 in 2000 with the current callsign, CHUB.
