= CBCX-FM =

Radio station in Calgary

- Calgary, Alberta; Canada
- Broadcast area: Central Alberta
- Frequency: 89.7 MHz
- Branding: Ici Musique

Programming
- Format: Public Music

Ownership
- Owner: Canadian Broadcasting Corporation

History
- First air date: 2003

Technical information
- Class: C
- ERP: 10,000 watts
- HAAT: 298.6 metres (980 ft)
- Transmitter coordinates: 51.065°N 114.214°W
- Repeater: CBCX-FM-1 (101.1 MHz) Edmonton

Links
- Website: ICI Musique

CBCX-FM is a Canadian radio station, which broadcasts Radio-Canada's Ici Musique network at 89.7 FM in Calgary, Alberta. CBCX's studios are located in the Cambrian Wellness Centre, northwest of downtown Calgary, while its transmitter is located at Old Banff Coach Road and 85 Street Southwest in Calgary.

The station also has a class A rebroadcaster CBCX-FM-1 in Edmonton at 101.1 MHz, with a power of 3,931 watts, and its transmitter located at 53°32′26.16″N 113°29′52.80″W.

Both of the station's transmitters were licensed in 2002 and launched in early 2003.

On January 20, 2012, it was announced that Radio-Canada planned to close down the AM transmitter of Edmonton's Première Chaîne outlet, CHFA, and swap frequencies between its nested repeater in Edmonton, CHFA-10-FM (101.1), and the much-stronger CBCX-FM-1 (90.1). This application was approved on June 22, 2012.
