= CBXFT-DT =

Television station in Alberta, Canada

Coordinates: 53°30′48″N 113°17′6″W

- Edmonton, Alberta; Canada
- Channels: Digital: 27 (UHF); Virtual: 11
- Branding: ICI Alberta

Programming
- Affiliations: 11.1: Ici Radio-Canada Télé

Ownership
- Owner: Société Radio-Canada
- Sister stations: CBXT-DT, CBX, CBX-FM, CBRT-DT

History
- First air date: March 1, 1970
- Former call signs: CBXFT (1970–2011)
- Former channel numbers: Analog: 11 (VHF, 1970–2011); Digital: 47 (UHF, until 2021)
- Former affiliations: MEETA (school days, 1970–1973)
- Call sign meaning: CBC X Français Télévision

Technical information
- Licensing authority: CRTC
- ERP: 18.475 kW
- HAAT: 234 m (768 ft)

Links
- Website: ICI Alberta

CBXFT-DT (channel 11) is an Ici Radio-Canada Télé station in Edmonton, Alberta, Canada, serving the province's Franco-Albertan population. It is part of a twinstick with CBC Television station CBXT-DT (channel 5). The two stations share studios at the Edmonton City Centre (across from Churchill Square) in Downtown Edmonton; CBXFT-DT's transmitter is located in Sherwood Park.

== History ==
The station first signed on the air on March 1, 1970. For its first three years, 1970 to 1973, CBXFT also aired weekday English-language educational programming from the Metropolitan Edmonton Educational Television Association (MEETA). This ended when Access (CJAL-TV) began in 1973.

A former semi-satellite in Calgary (using the callsign CBRFT) aired separate commercials, but otherwise aired identical programming prior to its shutdown in 2012.

== Newscasts ==
The local newscast at 6 p.m. is called Le Téléjournal/Alberta and is anchored by Jean-Emmanuel Fortier.

== Technical information ==
=== Subchannel ===
Subchannel of CBXFT-DT
Channel	Res.	Short name	Programming
11.1	720p	CBXFT-D	Ici Radio-Canada Télé

=== Analog-to-digital conversion ===
On August 31, 2011, when Canadian television stations in CRTC-designated mandatory markets transitioned from analog to digital broadcasts, the station flash cut its digital signal on UHF channel 44, using virtual channel 11. As part of the UHF spectrum repack, CBXFT-DT moved its signal from channel 47 to 27 in March 2021.

=== Former transmitters ===
CBXFT operated ten analog over-the-air television rebroadcasters broadcasting throughout the province of Alberta including transmitters in Bonnyville, Falher, Fort McMurray, Grande Prairie, Hinton, Red Deer, Jean Côté, Lac La Biche, Lethbridge, Medicine Hat, and Peace River.

Due to federal funding reductions to the CBC, in April 2012, the CBC responded with substantial budget cuts, which included shutting down CBC's and Radio-Canada's remaining analog transmitters on July 31, 2012. None of CBC or Radio-Canada's rebroadcasters were converted to digital.

CBC had originally decided that none of its rebroadcasters will transition to digital. Also, the CBC had originally planned to not convert any non-originating stations in mandatory markets to digital, which would have forced CBRFT in Calgary and CBXFT-3 in Lethbridge to sign off on the transition date. (Lloydminster, another mandatory market, had no local Radio-Canada transmitter.) On August 16, 2011, the Canadian Radio-television and Telecommunications Commission (CRTC) granted the CBC permission to continue operating 22 repeaters in mandatory markets, including CBRFT and CBXFT-3, in analog until August 31, 2012, by which time the transmitters had to convert to digital or shut down. The remaining transmitters were shut down in 2012.

City of license	Callsign	Channel
Bonnyville	CBXFT-1	6 (VHF)
Calgary	CBRFT	16 (UHF)
Falher	CBXFT-2	6 (VHF)
Fort McMurray	CBXFT-6	12 (VHF)
Grande Prairie	CBXFT-8	19 (UHF)
Hinton	CBXFT-7	3 (VHF)
Lethbridge	CBXFT-3	23 (UHF)
Medicine Hat	CBXFT-11	34 (UHF)
Peace River	CBXFT-5	9 (VHF)
Plamondon/Lac Labich	CBXFT-9	22 (UHF)
Red Deer	CBXFT-4	31 (UHF)

== See also ==
- CBXT-DT
- CBRT-DT
- Franco-Albertans
