= CHFA-FM =

Radio station in Edmonton

- Edmonton, Alberta; Canada
- Broadcast area: Alberta
- Frequency: 90.1 MHz

Programming
- Language: French
- Format: News/Talk
- Network: Ici Radio-Canada Première

Ownership
- Owner: Canadian Broadcasting Corporation

History
- First air date: 1949
- Former frequencies: 680 kHz (1949–2012)

Technical information
- Class: C1
- ERP: 100 kW
- HAAT: 193 metres (633 ft)
- Transmitter coordinates: 53.523°N 113.442°W

Links
- Website: Ici Radio-Canada Première

CHFA-FM is a Canadian radio station, which broadcasts the programming of Radio-Canada's Ici Radio-Canada Première network in Edmonton, Alberta.

The station was launched in 1949 by a local non-profit consortium to bring French radio service to Edmonton, and was directly acquired by the network in 1974.

The station serves the entire province of Alberta from its studios in the Edmonton City Centre, near Winston Churchill Square in Edmonton, although it also maintains a smaller bureau on Westmount Boulevard Northwest in Calgary. For most of its history, the station broadcast on the AM band on 680 kHz. On January 20, 2012, it was announced that Radio-Canada planned to close down CHFA's AM transmitter on 680, with its nested FM repeater in Edmonton, CHFA-10-FM on 101.1 MHz, swapping places with the much-stronger Espace musique station CBCX-FM-1 at 90.1 MHz. This application was approved by the Canadian Radio-television and Telecommunications Commission on June 22, 2012.

== Rebroadcasters ==
Rebroadcasters of CHFA
| City of licence | Identifier | Frequency | Power | Class | RECNet | CRTC Decision | Notes |
|---|---|---|---|---|---|---|---|
| Bonnyville | CHFA-14-FM | 98.7 FM | 12,300 watts | B | Query | 85-1277; 2021-95 | 54°10′54.84″N 110°51′57.60″W |
| Calgary | CBRF-FM | 103.9 FM | 22,000 watts | C | Query | | 51°3′54″N 114°12′50.40″W |
| Falher | CHFA-7-FM | 103.7 FM | 2,800 watts | A | Query | | 55°45′5.04″N 117°12′0″W |
| Fort McMurray | CHFA-6-FM | 101.5 FM | 20,000 watts | B | Query | | 56°48′29.16″N 111°26′56.40″W |
| Grande Prairie | CHFA-5-FM | 103.3 FM | 25,300 watts | C1 | Query | 2017-444 | 55°29′20.04″N 118°44′52.80″W |
| Hinton | CHFA-4-FM | 100.7 FM | 85 watts | A1 | Query | | 53°23′48.84″N 117°42′32.40″W |
| Lethbridge | CHFA-1-FM | 104.3 FM | 1,660 watts | B | Query | | 49°44′9.96″N 112°48′14.40″W |
| Medicine Hat | CHFA-8-FM | 100.5 FM | 800 watts | A | Query | | 50°2′45.96″N 110°37′12″W |
| Peace River | CHFA-3-FM | 92.5 FM | 732 watts | A | Query | | 56°9′25.92″N 117°18′50.40″W |
| Red Deer | CHFA-2-FM | 103.5 FM | 3,500 watts | B | Query | | 52°18′48.96″N 113°57′32.40″W |
| St. Paul | CHFA-9-FM | 105.5 FM | 3,440 watts | A | Query | 2012-676 | 53°59′33″N 111°13′40.80″W |
| Banff | CHFA-12-FM | 105.7 FM | 1,708 watts | A | Query | 2016-352 | 51°12′3.96″N 115°35′56.40″W |
| Jasper | CHFA-13-FM | 101.1 FM | 251 watts | A | Query | | 52°52′46.92″N 118°4′30″W |
| Lake Louise | CHFA-11-FM | 102.7 FM | 116 watts | A1 | Query | | 51°26′12.12″N 116°11′13.20″W |

On May 24, 2016, the CBC applied to add a new FM rebroadcaster at Jasper, Alberta. The new transmitter will operate at 101.1 MHz. The callsign for the new transmitter will be CHFA-FM-13.

On August 31, 2016, the CRTC approved the CBC's application to operate transmitters in Jasper on 101.1 MHz, Lake Louise on 102.7 MHz and Banff on 105.7 MHz that will rebroadcast the programming of its national French-language network service ICI Radio-Canada Première.

On December 12, 2017, the CBC received CRTC approval to change the authorized contours of the rebroadcasting transmitter CHFA-5-FM Grande Prairie, Alberta, by relocating the transmitter site, changing the frequency from 90.5 MHz (channel 213) to 103.3 MHz (channel 277) and the class from B to C1, and increasing the average effective radiated power from 5,000 to 25,300 watts and the effective height of the antenna above average terrain from 206.5 to 247.5 metres.

On November 20, 2020, the CBC applied to add a new FM rebroadcaster at Bonnyville, Alberta. The new transmitter will operate on 98.7 MHz to rebroadcast the programming of its national French-language network service ICI Radio-Canada Première. The callsign for the new transmitter will be CHFA-FM-14 and will replace CHFB-FM which is a privately owned community rebroadcasting facility l'Association Canadienne Française de l'Alberta. The CRTC approved the CBC's application on February 25, 2021.
