= List of radio stations in Manitoba =

The following is a list of radio stations in the Canadian province of Manitoba, as of 2024.

Call sign	Frequency	City of Licence	Owner	Format	Ref.
CFAM	950 AM	Altona	Golden West Broadcasting	easy listening	
CJIE-FM-1	99.5 FM	Arborg	5777152 Manitoba Ltd.	country/pop/rock	
CJSB-FM-1	99.1 FM	Benito	Stillwater Broadcasting	community radio	
VF2196	96.9 FM	Berens River	NCI	First Nations community radio	
VF2339	96.9 FM	Bloodvein	NCI	First Nations community radio	
CJRB	1220 AM	Boissevain	Golden West Broadcasting	easy listening	
CKLQ-FM	91.5 FM	Brandon	Westman Communications Group	country	
CBWS-FM	92.7 FM	Brandon	CBC Music	public music	
CKLF-FM	94.7 FM	Brandon	Pattison Media	hot adult contemporary	
CKX-FM	96.1 FM	Brandon	Bell Media Radio	adult hits	
CBWV-FM	97.9 FM	Brandon	CBC Radio One	public news/talk	
CKSB-8-FM	99.5 FM	Brandon	Ici Radio-Canada Première	public news/talk (French)	
CKXA-FM	101.1 FM	Brandon	Bell Media Radio	country	
CJJJ-FM	106.5 FM	Brandon	Assiniboine Community College	campus radio	
CIWM-FM	107.5 FM	Brandon	NCI	First Nations community radio	
VF2220	96.9 FM	Brochet	NCI	First Nations community radio	
CKBM-FM	93.5 FM	Brochet	Brochet Community Development Corporation	First Nations community radio	
CBDE-FM	105.1 FM	Brochet	CBC Radio One	public news/talk	
VF2420	93.9 FM	Camperville	NCI	First Nations community radio	
CHFC	1230 AM	Churchill	CBC Radio One	public news/talk	
VF2312	96.9 FM	Churchill	NCI	First Nations community radio	
VF2261	96.9 FM	Cormorant	NCI	First Nations community radio	
CBWU-FM	88.9 FM	Cranberry Portage	CBC Radio One	public news/talk	
CICP-FM	96.9 FM	Cranberry Portage	NCI	First Nations community radio	
CFNC	99.1 FM	Cross Lake	Cross Lake Radio Committee	First Nations community radio	
VF2195	93.5 FM	Cross Lake	NCI	First Nations community radio	
CKDM	730 AM	Dauphin	Dauphin Broadcasting	country/adult contemporary	
CBWW-FM	105.3 FM	Dauphin	CBC Radio One	public news/talk	
VF2421	93.5 FM	Dauphin River	NCI	First Nations community radio	
VF2262	96.9 FM	Duck Bay	NCI	First Nations community radio	
VF2337	93.5 FM	Easterville	NCI	First Nations community radio	
CBWE-FM	95.5 FM	Easterville	CBC Radio One	public news/talk	
CIFR-FM	96.9 FM	Fairford	NCI	First Nations community radio	
CBWZ-FM	104.1 FM	Fairford	CBC Radio One	public news/talk	
CBWX-FM	95.7 FM	Fisher Branch	CBC Radio One	public news/talk	
VF2503	96.9 FM	Fisher River	NCI	First Nations community radio	
CJFR-FM	103.5 FM	Fisher River/Koostatak	Ockekwi-Sipi Economic Development Corporation	First Nations community radio	
CFAR	590 AM; 102.9 FM	Flin Flon	Arctic Radio (1982) Ltd	adult contemporary	
CBWF-FM	90.9 FM	Flin Flon	CBC Radio One	public news/talk	
CKSB-4-FM	92.7 FM	Flin Flon	Ici Radio-Canada Première	public news/talk (French)	
CIFF-FM	101.1 FM	Flin Flon	NCI	First Nations community radio	
VF2463	102.7 FM	Fort Alexander/Sagkeeng First Nation	Sagkeeng Employment and Training	First Nations community radio	
VF2334	93.5 FM	Fox Lake	NCI	First Nations community radio	
VF2198	96.9 FM	Garden Hill	NCI	First Nations community radio	
VF2333	95.7 FM	Gillam	NCI	First Nations community radio	
CFIL-FM	97.1 FM	Gillam	Corus Entertainment	news/talk	
CBWG-FM	99.9 FM	Gillam	CBC Radio One	public news/talk	
CJGL-FM	101.5 FM	Gladstone	Gladstone Area Development Corporation	tourist information	
VF2174	93.5 FM	Gods Lake Narrows	NCI	First Nations community radio	
CBWN-FM	99.9 FM	Gods Lake Narrows	CBC Radio One	public news/talk	
VF2175	96.9 FM	Gods River	NCI	First Nations community radio	
VF2263	96.9 FM	Grand Rapids	NCI	First Nations community radio	
CBWH-FM	101.5 FM	Grand Rapids	CBC Radio One	public news/talk	
CHGR-FM	98.7 FM	Grand Rapids	Pelican Landing Development Corporation/Misipawistik First Nation	First Nations community radio	
VF2336	93.5 FM	Griswold	NCI	First Nations community radio	
VF2340	93.5 FM	Hollow Water	NCI	First Nations community radio	
VF2422	93.9 FM	Ilford	NCI	First Nations community radio	
CBWI-FM	94.7 FM	Ilford	CBC Radio One	public news/talk	
CBWY-FM	92.7 FM	Jackhead	CBC Radio One	public news/talk	
VF2404	93.5 FM	Jackhead	NCI	First Nations community radio	
CJEN-FM	96.1 FM	Jenpeg	Corus Entertainment	news/talk	
VF2106	96.9 FM	Lac Brochet	NCI	First Nations community radio	
VF2335	93.5 FM	Lake Manitoba	NCI	First Nations community radio	
VF2406	93.5 FM	Leaf Rapids	NCI	First Nations community radio	
CBWP-FM	94.5 FM	Leaf Rapids	CBC Radio One	public news/talk	
CHGG-FM	96.1 FM	Limestone	Corus Entertainment	news/talk	
VF2407	96.9 FM	Little Grand Rapids	NCI	First Nations community radio	
CBWR-FM	101.5 FM	Little Grand Rapids	CBC Radio One	public news/talk	
VF2382	101.7 FM	Long Plain	NCI	First Nations community radio	
VF2423	96.9 FM	Lynn Lake	NCI	First Nations community radio	
CBWA-FM	101.3 FM	Manigotagan	CBC Radio One	public news/talk	
CISB-FM	106.3 FM	Marius/Sandy Bay Ojibway First Nation	Sandy Bay Ojibway First Nation	First Nations community radio	
VF2313	96.9 FM	Moose Lake	NCI	First Nations community radio	
CBWC-FM	99.9 FM	Moose Lake	CBC Radio One	public news/talk	
VF2466	107.3 FM	Morden	Pembina Valley Development Corporation	tourist information	
VF2464	103.7 FM	Morris	Pembina Valley Development Corporation	tourist information	
CJBP-FM	97.1 FM	Neepawa	5777152 Manitoba Ltd.	country	
CBWO-FM	93.7 FM	Nelson House	CBC Radio One	public news/talk	
VF2222	96.9 FM	Nelson House	NCI	First Nations community radio	
CINR-FM	92.9 FM	Norway House	NCI	First Nations community radio	
CJNC-FM	97.9 FM	Norway House	Norway House Communications	First Nations community radio	
CKNH-FM	102.7 FM	Norway House	Norway House Community Economic Development Corporation	First Nations community radio	
CBWM-FM	95.5 FM	Oxford House	CBC Radio One	public news/talk	
VF2314	96.9 FM	Oxford House	NCI	First Nations community radio	
CJAR	1240 AM; 102.9 FM	The Pas	Arctic Radio (1982) Ltd	adult contemporary	
CITP-FM	92.7 FM	The Pas	NCI	First Nations community radio	
CKSB-3-FM	93.7 FM	The Pas	Ici Radio-Canada Première	public news/talk (French)	
CBWJ-FM	94.5 FM	The Pas	CBC Radio One	public news/talk	
VF2504	93.3 FM	Paint Lake	NCI	First Nations community radio	
VF2405	93.5 FM	Pauingassi	NCI	First Nations community radio	
CJFN-FM	102.7 FM	Peguis	Peguis Development Corporation	First Nations community radio	
CIPM-FM	100.9 FM	Peguis	NCI	First Nations community radio	
CKQX-FM	96.9 FM	Pelican Rapids	Sapotawayak Cree Nation School	First Nations community radio	
VF2264	96.9 FM	Pikwitonei	NCI	First Nations community radio	
CBDI-FM	103.5 FM	Poplar River	CBC Radio One	public news/talk	
VF2107	96.9 FM	Poplar River	NCI	First Nations community radio	
CFRY	920 AM	Portage la Prairie	Golden West Broadcasting	country	
CHPO-FM	93.1 FM	Portage la Prairie	Golden West Broadcasting	classic rock	
CJPG-FM	96.5 FM	Portage la Prairie	Golden West Broadcasting	classic hits	
VF2167	96.9 FM	Pukatawagan	NCI	First Nations community radio	
CFPX-FM	98.3 FM	Pukatawagan	Missinipi River Communications	First Nations community radio	
CBDS-FM	102.5 FM	Pukatawagan	CBC Radio One	public news/talk	
VF2108	96.9 FM	Red Sucker Lake	NCI	First Nations community radio	
CKSB-2	860 AM	St. Lazare	Ici Radio-Canada Première	public news/talk (French)	
CKSB-1-FM	92.9 FM	Ste. Rose du Lac	Ici Radio-Canada Première	public news/talk (French)	
CIST-FM	93.5 FM	St. Theresa Point	NCI	First Nations community radio	
CFQX-FM	104.1 FM	Selkirk	Pattison Media	country	
CICY-FM	105.5 FM	Selkirk	NCI	First Nations community radio	
VF2199	96.9 FM	Shamattawa	NCI	First Nations community radio	
CBDG-FM	105.1 FM	Shamattawa	CBC Radio One	public news/talk	
VF2342	93.5 FM	Sherridon	NCI	First Nations community radio	
CBWL-FM	95.5 FM	Snow Lake	CBC Radio One	public news/talk	
VF2462	96.3 FM	Snow Lake	NCI	First Nations community radio	
CBWQ-FM	95.5 FM	South Indian Lake	CBC Radio One	public news/talk	
CISI-FM	96.9 FM	South Indian Lake	NCI	First Nations community radio	
VF2265	96.9 FM	Split Lake	NCI	First Nations community radio	
CHSM	1250 AM	Steinbach	Golden West Broadcasting	easy listening	
CILT-FM	96.7 FM	Steinbach	Golden West Broadcasting	classic hits	
CJXR-FM	107.7 FM	Steinbach	Golden West Broadcasting	country	
CISV-FM	93.3 FM	Swan River	NCI	First Nations community radio	
CFGW-FM-1	95.3 FM	Swan River	GX Radio Partnership	hot adult contemporary	
CJSB-FM	104.5 FM	Swan River	Stillwater Broadcasting	community radio	
VF2109	96.9 FM	Tadoule Lake	NCI	First Nations community radio	
VF2338	96.9 FM	Thicket Portage	NCI	First Nations community radio	
CHTM	610 AM; 102.9 FM	Thompson	Arctic Radio (1982) Ltd	adult contemporary	
CINC-FM	96.3 FM	Thompson	NCI	First Nations community radio	
CKSB-5-FM	99.9 FM	Thompson	Ici Radio-Canada Première	public news/talk (French)	
CBWK-FM	100.9 FM	Thompson	CBC Radio One	public news/talk	
CJVM-FM	103.3 FM	Virden	5777152 Manitoba Ltd.	country/rock/pop/oldies	
CBWD-FM	105.1 FM	Waasagomach	CBC Radio One	public news/talk	
CBWB-FM	90.5 FM	Wabowden	CBC Radio One	public news/talk	
VF2168	96.9 FM	Wabowden	NCI	First Nations community radio	
CIWR-FM	93.5 FM	Waterhen	NCI	First Nations community radio	
CHWH-FM	103.7 FM	West Hawk Lake	Falcon & West Hawk Lake Chamber of Commerce	tourist information	
CKMW-FM	88.9 FM	Winkler	Golden West Broadcasting	country	
CJEL-FM	93.5 FM	Winkler	Golden West Broadcasting	adult contemporary	
VF2465	101.3 FM	Winkler	Pembina Valley Development Corporation	tourist information	
CJOB	680 AM	Winnipeg	Corus Entertainment	news/talk	
CBW	990 AM	Winnipeg	CBC Radio One	public news/talk	
CKSB-10-FM	88.1 FM	Winnipeg	Ici Radio-Canada Première	public news/talk (French)	
NEW	88.7 FM	Winnipeg	U Multicultural Inc.	community radio	
CBW-1-FM	89.3 FM	Winnipeg	CBC Radio One	public news/talk	
CKSB-FM	89.9 FM	Winnipeg	Ici Musique	public music (French)	
CKXL-FM	91.1 FM	Winnipeg	La Radio communautaire du Manitoba Inc.	community radio (French)	
CITI-FM	92.1 FM	Winnipeg	Rogers Communications	mainstream rock	
CKJS-FM	92.7 FM	Winnipeg	Evanov Communications	multilingual	
CJNU-FM	93.7 FM	Winnipeg	Nostalgia Broadcasting Cooperative	pop standards	
CHNW-FM	94.3 FM	Winnipeg	Pattison Media	alternative rock	
CHVN-FM	95.1 FM	Winnipeg	Golden West Broadcasting	Christian radio	
CKUW-FM	95.9 FM	Winnipeg	The Winnipeg Campus/Community Radio Society Inc.	campus radio	
CJKR-FM	97.5 FM	Winnipeg	Corus Entertainment	active rock	
CBW-FM	98.3 FM	Winnipeg	CBC Music	public music	
CFPG-FM	99.1 FM	Winnipeg	Corus Entertainment	country	
CFWM-FM	99.9 FM	Winnipeg	Bell Media Radio	adult hits	
CFJL-FM	100.5 FM	Winnipeg	Evanov Communications	adult standards	
CJUM-FM	101.5 FM	Winnipeg	UMFM Campus Radio Inc.	campus radio	
CKY-FM	102.3 FM	Winnipeg	Rogers Communications	hot adult contemporary	
CKMM-FM	103.1 FM	Winnipeg	Bell Media Radio	CHR	
CIUR-FM	104.7 FM	Winnipeg	NCI	country	
CHWE-FM	106.1 FM	Winnipeg	Evanov Communications	CHR	
CKCL-FM	107.1 FM	Winnipeg	Golden West Broadcasting	Classical and Jazz	
CJIE-FM	107.5 FM	Winnipeg Beach	5777152 Manitoba Ltd.	country/pop/rock	
CHYL-FM	93.5 FM	York Landing	York Factory First Nation Radio Committee	First Nations community radio	

== See also ==
- Lists of radio stations in North and Central America
