= Media in Winnipeg =

The following is a list of media outlets in Winnipeg, Manitoba, Canada. Such outlets can include newspapers, radio and television stations, and online media operating in and serving Winnipeg and/or the Winnipeg Metro Region.

Active in Winnipeg are various local, national, and international media outlets; local outlets also include neighbourhood and ethnic media.

== Print media ==
=== Mainstream newspapers ===
Name	Publisher	Format	Frequency	Demographic
Metro Winnipeg	Metro International	Newspaper	Defunct; formerly daily	General readership
Winnipeg Free Press	FP Canadian Newspapers LP	Broadsheet newspaper	Daily	General readership
Winnipeg Sun	Postmedia Network	Tabloid newspaper	Daily	General readership
Winnipeg Tribune	Southam Newspapers	Broadsheet newspaper	Defunct; formerly daily	General readership

=== Ethnic print media ===
Name	Publisher	Format	Frequency	Demographic
Ang Peryodiko (Canada)		Newspaper		Filipino
The Filipino Journal		Newspaper	Twice monthly	Filipino
Grassroots News	A. A. Aboriginal Advertising Inc.	Newspaper		Indigenous, including First Nations and Métis
The Jewish Post & News		Newspaper	Every two weeks	Jewish
La Liberté	Presse-Ouest Limitée	Tabloid newspaper	Weekly	Francophone
Lögberg-Heimskringla	Lögberg-Heimskringla Inc.	Newspaper, print and online	Every two weeks	Icelandic
Manitoba China Times		Newspaper		Chinese
Manitoba Chinese Tribune	Voice of Fenghua	Newspaper	Every two months	Chinese
Manitoba Indochina Chinese News		Newspaper		Chinese
The Manitoba Muslim		Newspaper		Muslim
Mennonite Brethren Herald	Canadian Conference of Mennonite Brethren Churches	Magazine		Mennonite Brethren
Navegante Cultural	Mia Sally Correia, Navegante Cultural	Print and online publication	Monthly	Portuguese and intercultural
O Mundial		Newspaper		Portuguese
The Philippine Times		Newspaper	Monthly	Filipino
Pilipino Express	The Pilipino Express Inc.	News magazine	Twice monthly	Filipino
Ukrainian Voice	Ukrainian Self-Reliance League of Canada	Newspaper		Ukrainian
Visnyk	Ukrainian Orthodox Church of Canada	Newspaper		Ukrainian Orthodox

=== Periodical newspapers ===
Name	Publisher	Format	Frequency	Demographic
The Headliner	Canstar Community Newspapers	Print newspaper	Defunct	Fannystelle, Sanford, Cartier, Headingley, Macdonald, St. François Xavier, and Rosser
The Herald	Canstar Community Newspapers	Print newspaper	Defunct	Birds Hill, East Kildonan, East St. Paul, Elmwood, Harbour View, Lakeside Meadows, North Kildonan, and Transcona
The Lance	Canstar Community Newspapers	Print newspaper	Defunct	Island Lakes, River Park South, Southdale, St. Boniface, St. Vital, and Windsor Park
The Manitoban	Manitoban Newspaper Publications Corporation	Tabloid	Weekly during fall and winter academic terms; monthly during summer	University of Manitoba students
The Metro	Canstar Community Newspapers	Print newspaper	Defunct	St. James-Assiniboia, Charleswood, West End, and Wolseley
The Projector	Red River College Students' Association	Online newspaper; print edition ended in 2017	Updated online; formerly every two weeks in print	Red River College Polytechnic students
Senior Scope	Kelly Goodman	Tabloid; print and online	Monthly	Adults aged 55 and older in Winnipeg and rural Manitoba
The Sou'wester	Canstar Community Newspapers	Print newspaper	Defunct	Fort Garry, Fort Richmond, Fort Rouge, Crescentwood, Waverley Heights, Richmond West, Linden Woods, Tuxedo, St. Norbert, Linden Ridge, Whyte Ridge, Bridgwater, and River Heights
The Times	Canstar Community Newspapers	Print newspaper	Defunct	Amber Trails, Brooklands, Garden City, The Maples, North End, Tyndall Park, West Kildonan, and West St. Paul
Transcona Views and Advertiser	Bond Printing Ltd.	Print newspaper and online PDF	Monthly, with a combined July–August issue	Transcona
The Uniter	Mouseland Press	Print and online newspaper	Weekly during the academic year	University of Winnipeg students and the downtown community
Voxair	CFB Winnipeg	Online publication; formerly a print newspaper and magazine		17 Wing community
Winnipeg Regional Real Estate News	Winnipeg Regional Real Estate Board	Print and online newspaper	Weekly	Home buyers, sellers, and the real estate community

In 2022, Canstar's six weekly newspapers, The Headliner, The Herald, The Lance, The Metro, The Sou'wester, and The Times, merged into the Free Press Community Review, which published East and West editions every Wednesday. The successor publication's final delivered editions appeared in July 2026.

=== Magazines ===
Name	Publisher	Format	Frequency	Genre
Academic Insight (ISSN 2816-5764)	IMAQPRESS Inc.	Online	Annually	Academics and technology
Border Crossings	Arts Manitoba Publications Inc.	Print	Three times annually	Arts and culture
Canada's History	Canada's History Society	Print and online	Quarterly	Canadian history
Canadian Dimension	Dimension Publications Inc.	Online; print edition ended in 2019	Updated online	Left-wing politics
Ciao!	Fanfare Magazine Group	Print and online	Six times annually	Food
Commercial Real Estate Magazine	Winnipeg Regional Real Estate Board	Print and online	Twice annually	Real estate
Contemporary Verse 2	Contemporary Verse 2 Inc.	Print	Quarterly	Poetry
Downtown Winnipeg Magazine	Downtown Winnipeg BIZ	Print and online	Defunct	Urban lifestyle
Game On	The Davis Media Company	Print and online	Six times annually	Hockey
Herizons	Herizons Inc.	Print and online	Quarterly	Feminism
The Huddle	The Huddle Media, on behalf of Football Manitoba	Print and online	Quarterly	Football
Kayak: Canada's History Magazine for Kids	Canada's History Society	Print and online	Three times annually	Canadian history for children
OutWords	Outwords Inc.	Print and online	Defunct	LGBT
Prairie Fire	Prairie Fire Press Inc.	Print	Quarterly	Literature
Style Manitoba	Rare Communications	Print and online	Quarterly	Lifestyle and design
TASTE	Fanfare Magazine Group	Print and online	Annually	Food (culinary guide)
Uptown Magazine	Canstar Community Newspapers	Print	Defunct as a standalone publication; formerly weekly	Arts and entertainment
Visitor's Guide	Tourism Winnipeg	Print and online	Annually	Tourism
WHERE Winnipeg	Fanfare Magazine Group	Print	Every two months	Tourism
Winnipeg Men	MediaEdge Publishing Inc.	Print and online	Defunct	Men's lifestyle
Winnipeg Women	Studio Publications Inc.; subsequently MediaEdge Publishing Inc.	Print and online	Defunct	Women's lifestyle

== Television ==
=== Free television ===
Five English-language television stations and one French-language station provide free over-the-air programming in the Winnipeg market.

Virtual channel	Broadcast channel	Call sign	Network or branding	Owner	Language
3.1	32 (UHF)	CBWFT-DT	Ici Radio-Canada Télé	Canadian Broadcasting Corporation	French
6.1	27 (UHF)	CBWT-DT	CBC Television	Canadian Broadcasting Corporation	English
7.1	7 (VHF)	CKY-DT	CTV	Bell Media	English
9.1	19 (UHF)	CKND-DT	Global	Corus Entertainment	English
13.1	13 (VHF)	CHMI-DT	Citytv	Rogers Sports & Media	English
35.1	35 (UHF)	CIIT-DT	FaithTV	ZoomerMedia	English

U Multicultural Inc. holds a licence for CFUM-DT, a multilingual community television station on channel 14. As of 30 October 2026, the station had not commenced operations.

=== Cable television ===
The following cable television services are based in Winnipeg or were launched by Winnipeg-based broadcasters.

Name	Owner	Programming	Notes
Aboriginal Peoples Television Network (APTN)	Aboriginal Peoples Television Network Inc.	Indigenous programming	
APTN Languages	Aboriginal Peoples Television Network Inc.	Indigenous-language programming	Launched in 2024.
CoolTV	Canwest	Music	Defunct.
DejaView	Corus Entertainment	Classic television	Launched by Canwest.
Fox Sports World Canada	Shaw Media	Sports	Closed in 2012.
Lonestar	Canwest at launch	Westerns	Became MovieTime in 2008.
Men TV	Groupe TVA and Canwest at launch	Men's lifestyle	Later became History2.
Mystery TV	Canwest, Groupe TVA and Rogers Communications at launch	Mystery and suspense	Became Crime + Investigation in 2014.
Prime	Canwest at launch	Classic television	Later rebranded as TVTropolis in 2006; now known as DTour.
Rogers tv Winnipeg	Rogers Communications	Community television	
Women's Television Network	Moffat Communications at launch	Women's programming	Moved to Toronto and became W Network in 2002.
X-Treme Sports	Canwest	Sports	Defunct.

== Radio ==
The following stations serve Winnipeg and nearby communities.

=== AM stations ===
AM radio stations serving Winnipeg
Frequency (kHz)	Call sign	Brand or network	Programming	Owner or operator
680	CJOB	680 CJOB	News and talk	Corus Entertainment
990	CBW	CBC Radio One	News and talk	Canadian Broadcasting Corporation
1290	CJRC	Connect Winnipeg 1290 AM	Talk and music	Akash Broadcasting Inc.

=== FM stations ===
FM radio stations serving Winnipeg
Frequency (MHz)	Call sign	Brand or network	Programming	Owner or operator	Notes
88.1	CKSB-10-FM	Ici Radio-Canada Première	French-language news and talk	CBC/Radio-Canada	
88.7	CHEB-FM	U Radio	Multilingual community radio	U Multicultural Inc.	Also streams online.
89.3	CBW-1-FM	CBC Radio One	News and talk	Canadian Broadcasting Corporation	Rebroadcasts CBW.
89.9	CKSB-FM	Ici Musique	French-language music	CBC/Radio-Canada	
91.1	CKXL-FM	Envol 91	French-language community radio	La Radio communautaire du Manitoba inc.	
92.1	CITI-FM	92.1 CITI	Classic rock	Rogers Communications	
92.7	CKJS-FM	92.7 CKJS	Multilingual programming	Evanov Communications	
93.7	CJNU-FM	Nostalgia Radio	Adult standards	Nostalgia Broadcasting Cooperative	
94.3	CHNW-FM	ALT 94.3	Alternative rock	Pattison Media	
95.1	CHVN-FM	CHVN 95.1	Contemporary Christian music	Golden West Broadcasting	
95.9	CKUW-FM	CKUW 95.9	Campus and community radio	Winnipeg Campus/Community Radio Society	Based at the University of Winnipeg.
96.7	CILT-FM	Mix 96.7	Adult contemporary and classic hits	Golden West Broadcasting	Based in Steinbach.
96.9	CKYZ-FM	Radio Awaz	South Asian programming	Gill Broadcasting Ltd.	
97.5	CJKR-FM	Power 97	Active rock	Corus Entertainment	
98.3	CBW-FM	CBC Music	Music	Canadian Broadcasting Corporation	
99.1	CFPG-FM	Country 99	Country music	Corus Entertainment	
99.9	CFWM-FM	Bounce 99.9	Adult hits	Bell Media	
100.5	CFJL-FM	Hot 100.5	Classic hits	Evanov Communications	
101.5	CJUM-FM	UMFM	Campus and community radio	UMFM Campus Radio	Based at the University of Manitoba.
102.3	CKY-FM	KiSS 102.3	Hot adult contemporary	Rogers Communications	
103.1	CKMM-FM	103.1 Virgin Radio	Contemporary hits	Bell Media	
104.1	CFQX-FM	QX104	Country music	Pattison Media	Licensed to Selkirk.
104.7	CIUR-FM	ziibi 104.7	Programming for Indigenous young adults	Native Communications Inc.	
105.5	CICY-FM	NCI-FM	Country music and Indigenous programming	Native Communications Inc.	Licensed to Selkirk.
106.1	CHWE-FM	Energy 106	Contemporary hits	Evanov Communications	
107.1	CKCL-FM	Classic 107	Jazz and classical music	Golden West Broadcasting	

=== Internet radio ===
Internet-only radio stations
Name	Programming	Website
Smooth Radio Canada	Soft adult contemporary	Official website

=== Former and temporary stations ===
Former and temporary radio stations
Frequency	Call sign	Brand	Programming	Owner or operator	Notes
580 AM	CJML		Community and special events		Used for temporary broadcasts in 2005.
92.9 FM	CKIC-FM	92.9 KICK-FM	Alternative rock and campus radio	Red River College	Ceased over-the-air broadcasting in 2012.
107.9 FM	CJWV-FM	Flava 107.9	Urban contemporary	Harmony Broadcasting Ltd.	Defunct

=== Defunct ===
In 1922, George Melrose Bell, from Calgary, was licensed to launch a radio station in Winnipeg known as CKZC-AM. However, the license would expire and the station never made it to air, as Bell would be too preoccupied in launching stations in Calgary and Regina. Another defunct station, CKZC, was launched by Lynn V. Salton (1897-1956) in 1922. Salton later became the radio operator for the Winnipeg Free Press' radio station that operated until 1923 .

On January 23, 2012, the CRTC ruled that campus radio stations in Canada could no longer use students as on-air DJs, and instead would follow the definition of a community radio station. Red River College's CKIC would be the first station to be forced off the air as result of this decision. At 4 PM on July 4, 2012, the station shut down its operation as an over-the-air broadcaster and turned in the corresponding license to the CRTC. The station would later plan to return to the air as an internet-only radio station, beginning in the Fall of 2012.

== Online media ==
Online outlets
Outlet	Content	Areas served
Access Winnipeg		Winnipeg
ChrisD.ca	News, sports, and entertainment	Winnipeg and southern Manitoba
Manitoba Post	News, sports, and entertainment	Winnipeg
Spectator Tribune	News, politics, arts	Winnipeg
Academic Insight	Academic News, Science, Research	Canada Only
U Multicultural Channel	News, opinions, TV streaming, U Radio	Manitoba, Alberta, Saskatchewan, British Columbia, Ontario
U Radio	Opinions, podcasts, ethnocultural and folk music	Manitoba, Alberta, Saskatchewan, British Columbia, Ontario

Community TV and radio broadcaster
Name	Owner / Distributor	Demographic
RTV (Канадская русскоязычная телесеть)	Shaw TV	Russian
U Multicultural Channel	U Multicultural Inc.	Portuguese, Chinese, Russian, Filipino, Korean, Brazilian, Yazidi, German, South-Asian

=== Podcasts ===
Podcast networks in Winnipeg:

- The Garbage Hill Podcast Network — Winnipeg's first independent podcast network.
- Manitoba Podcast Network — A collection of locally produced online shows. Subjects include film, pop culture, craft beer, video games, etc.

Podcast shows
Name	Host(s)	Format	Subject / genre	Description / Notes
Couch Surfin'	Devin Bray and Terrance Williams	Interview	Winnipeg influencers / personalities	Notable guests: Fred Penner, Charles Adler, Jon Ljungberg, Filthy Animals' rapper Broms, and UFC fighters Joe Doerkson and Roland Delorme. Awards: "Best Local Podcast 2013" by The Uniter, University of Winnipeg's student newspaper.
Media Nerds Podcast	Kenton Larsen and Dan Vadeboncoeur	Weekly discussion	Media (TV, film, advertising, journalism, radio, social)	Hosted by two instructors of Creative Communications, Red River College.
Musing While Boozing		Informal discussion	Pop culture / current events	A recorded hang out with two Winnipeg guys, discussing hot topics over cold drinks with special guests.
Nintendo Pulse	Lloyd Hannesson			A member of the Winnipeg-based REZD.tv network, and has recorded in Winnipeg since 2006.
Return to Sender		Interview / discussion	Music and comedy	Focused on promoting little-known, often local, bands.
The Supporting Act		Interview	Local and touring artists (comedians, musicians, etc.)	Informal interview style.
U Talk	U Radio by U Multicultural	Talk show	Diverse voices of Canada	Topics related to the ethnocultural and indigenous community of Canada

== National media in Winnipeg ==
Various national/international media outlets base their Manitoba branches/newsrooms out of Winnipeg. These include:

- CBC/Radio-Canada (CBC Manitoba / ICI Manitoba)
- CityTV / CityNews (CityTV Winnipeg / CityNews Winnipeg)
- CTV (CTV Winnipeg) — #1 broadcaster in Manitoba
- Global News (Global Winnipeg)
- Prairie Public Broadcasting
- The Western Producer — agricultural publication

== See also ==
- Media of Canada
