= Michelle Sawatzky-Koop =

Canadian volleyball player (born 1970)

Personal information
- Nationality: Canada
- Born: July 14, 1970 (age 56); Steinbach, Manitoba
- Education: Manitoba

Volleyball information
- Position: Setter

National team
1993 – 1996	Canada
Honours
Women's volleyball
Representing Canada
Pan American Games
Bronze medal – third place	1995 Mar del Plata	Women's volleyball

Michelle Sawatzky-Koop (born July 14, 1970 in Steinbach, Manitoba) is a Canadian retired volleyball player and former radio broadcaster. She competed at the 1996 Summer Olympics in Atlanta, Georgia with the Women's National Team, where the team finished 9th.

As a university player for the Manitoba Bisons, she was a two-time CIS Championship MVP in 1990 and 1991, as well a two-time CIS player of the year for the 1990–91 and 1991-92 seasons. Sawatzky was a part of the Bison's women's volleyball team that won three CIS championships in 1990, 1991 and 1992. In 1995, she joined the Canadian national team, who won a bronze medal at the Pan American Games in Argentina. In July 1996 the team finished 9th at the Summer Olympics in Atlanta.

From 1997 to 2024, Sawatzky was a radio broadcaster and Morning Show co-host on CHSM, CFAM, and CJRB radio in southern Manitoba. In 2024, she left radio to work for the Southeast Event Centre in downtown Steinbach.

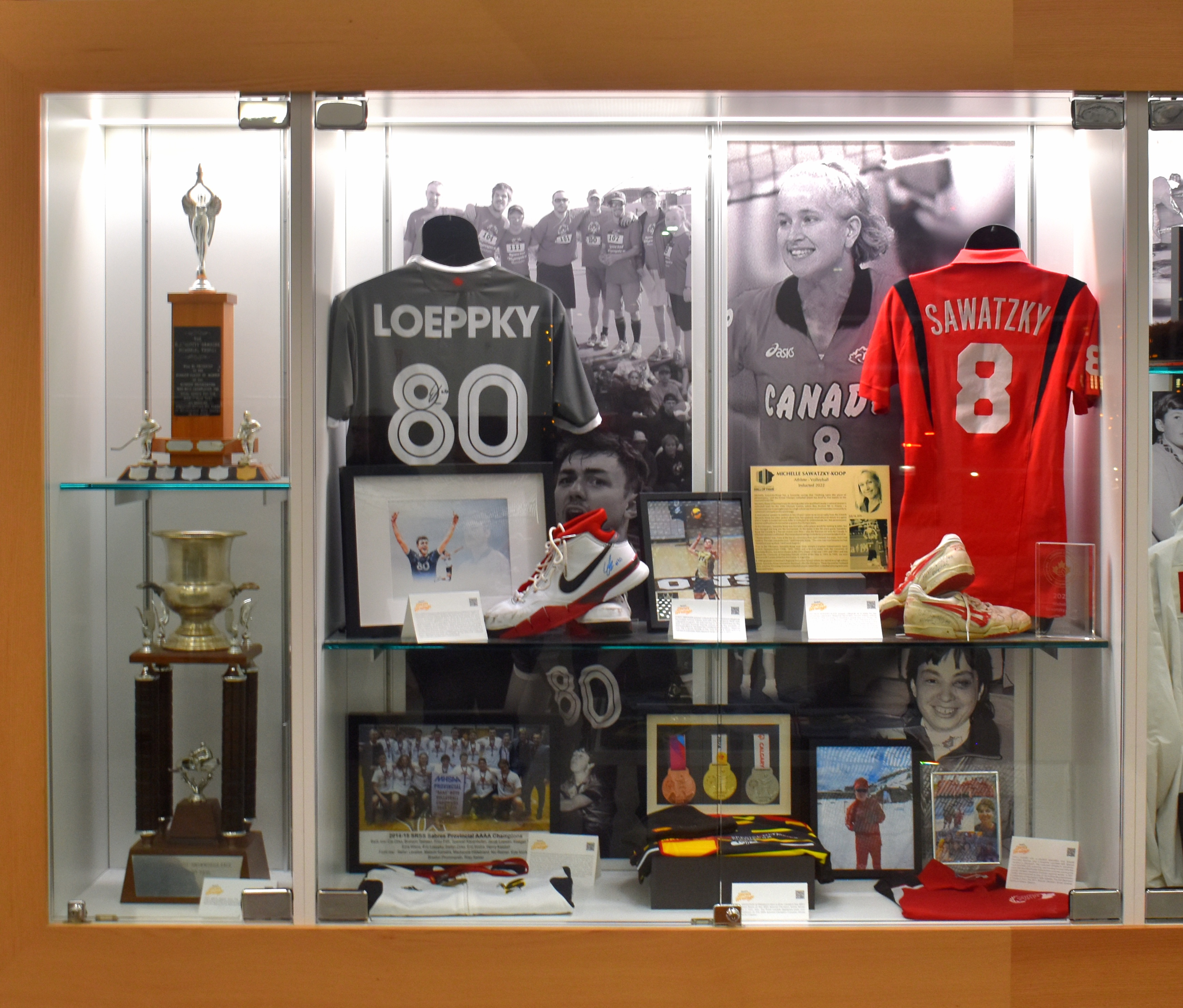
An exhibit at the Southeast Event Centre displaying some of Sawatzky's Olympic sports memoribila.

Sawatzky graduated from the University of Manitoba School of Music in 1993 with a Bachelor of Music Piano Performance. She has also organized and participated in the annual Southeastern Manitoba Festival, which takes place in Steinbach.

Sawatzky was elected into the Manitoba Sports Hall of Fame in 2022 and the Volleyball Canada Hall of Fame in 2024.
