= CJWW =

Radio station in Saskatoon, Saskatchewan

Coordinates: 52°04′25″N 106°48′39″W

- Saskatoon, Saskatchewan; Canada
- Broadcast area: Central Saskatchewan
- Frequency: 600 kHz
- Branding: Country 600 CJWW

Programming
- Format: Country
- Affiliations: Saskatoon Blades

Ownership
- Owner: Elmer Hildebrand Communications, Inc; (629112 Saskatchewan Ltd.)
- Sister stations: CJMK-FM,

History
- First air date: January 12, 1976
- Former frequencies: 1370 kHz (1976–1985); 750 kHz (1985–1995)

Technical information
- Class: B
- Power: 25,000 watts day; 8,000 watts night

Links
- Website: cjwwradio.com

CJWW (Country 600 CJWW) is a Canadian radio station, airing a country format at 600 AM in Saskatoon, Saskatchewan. The station is owned by Elmer Hildebrand via 629112 Saskatchewan Ltd., trading as Saskatoon Media Group. It shares studios with sister station CJMK-FM at 219 Robin Crescent (as of June 21, 2021). The station before that was located in downtown Saskatoon on 3rd Avenue South.

Originally launching at 1370 AM on January 12, 1976, it moved to 750 in 1985, and finally to 600 (the former AM frequency of sister station CFQC radio) in 1995.

When it went on the air, CJWW had an easy listening format. In 1980, the station flipped to its current country format.
