= CBWD =

CBWD may refer to:

- CBWD (AM), a radio rebroadcaster (900 AM) licensed to Donald, British Columbia, Canada, rebroadcasting CBTK-FM
- CBWD-FM, a radio rebroadcaster (105.1 FM) licensed to Waasagomach, Manitoba, Canada, rebroadcasting CBWK-FM
