= CKFI =

CKFI may refer to:

- CKFI-FM, a radio station (97.1 FM) licensed to Swift Current, Saskatchewan, Canada
- CFOB-FM, a radio station (93.1 FM) licensed to Fort Frances, Ontario, Canada, which held the call sign CKFI from 1944 to 1955
