= CHAB (AM) =

Radio station in Moose Jaw

- Moose Jaw, Saskatchewan; Canada
- Broadcast area: Southern Saskatchewan
- Frequency: 800 kHz
- Branding: 800 CHAB

Programming
- Language: English
- Format: Oldies/Classic hits

Ownership
- Owner: Golden West Broadcasting; (101142236 Saskatchewan Ltd.)
- Sister stations: CJAW-FM, CILG-FM, CHAB-TV

History
- First air date: April 23, 1922
- Former call signs: 10AB (1922–1933)
- Former frequencies: 1200 kHz (1922–1941); 1220 kHz (1941–1946)

Technical information
- Class: B
- Power: 10,000 watts
- Transmitter coordinates: 50°22′38″N 105°23′35″W

Links
- Webcast: Listen Live
- Website: discovermoosejaw.com/chab

CHAB (800 AM) is a radio station in Moose Jaw, Saskatchewan. Owned by Golden West Broadcasting, it broadcasts a classic hits format serving Moose Jaw and the surrounding area.

The station first began broadcasting in 1922 at 1200 AM as 10AB before becoming CHAB on December 17, 1933, before moving to 1220 AM in 1941 and to its current dial position at 800 AM in 1946. CHAB broadcasts with a power of 10,000 watts day and night, with a directional three-tower antenna during nighttime hours and a non-directional antenna during the daytime.

CHAB's studios are located alongside its sister stations at 1704 Main Street North in Moose Jaw.

== History ==
The station was an affiliate of the Canadian Radio Broadcasting Commission from 1933 to 1936 when it affiliated with the newly formed Canadian Broadcasting Corporation. In 1944, it became an affiliate for the CBC's Dominion Network until 1962 when the Dominion Network folded and CHAB became an independent station.

Prior to its current classic hits format, CHAB has been a Top 40/CHR station from the early 1960s until the mid-1990s. Although in the late 1980s, the station aired a few classic hits into their playlist, though it continued to air a top 40 station until the mid-1990s. In the mid-1990s, the station switched to a country format station rebranded as Country 800. On July 23, 2002, the station switched to its former oldies format with its current slogan "The Greatest Hits Of All Time". It became a mix of oldies and classic hits station on May 15, 2006.

In 2010, the CRTC approved a corporate reorganization to place CHAB, CJAW-FM and CILG-FM under 101142236 Saskatchewan Ltd, a subsidiary of Elmer Hildebrand Ltd.—the majority shareholder of Golden West Broadcasting. The reorganization was stated to be for estate planning reasons, and that this would not affect the effective control of the station.

On November 15, 2023, the station began networking its morning show, hosted by news director Rob Carnie, to all other Golden West AM stations in Saskatchewan. Concurrently, all Golden West AM country stations in Saskatchewan moved their formats to FM and flipped to classic hits.
