= CJSB =

CJSB may refer to:

- CJSB-FM, a radio station (104.5 FM) licensed to Swan River, Manitoba, Canada
- CKQB-FM, a radio station (106.9 FM) licensed to Ottawa, Ontario, Canada, which held the call sign CJSB from 1982 to 1994
