= Don Peuramaki =

- Occupation: Media producer
- Known for: Writer, naturalist, advocate for those with disabilities

Don Peuramaki is a Canadian producer, writer, advocate for the rights of individuals with disabilities, and naturalist. He has been described as a leader in efforts to recognize the role individuals with disabilities can play in the Canadian workplace.

== Media and advocacy career ==
According to the Toronto Star Peuramaki was an associate producer for CILT-FM in 1988. They described him as senior producer of the Canadian Broadcasting Corporation's The Disability Network in 1991, when they reported his opinion on GO Transit's announcement that its trains would be fully accessible by 1993. In 2004, following an announcement by the Canadian Radio and Television Commission that mandated greater opportunities for inclusion for individuals with disabilities, the Toronto Star credited Peuramaki with a greater share of the credit than it did to the CRTC. They reported he "is credited with leading the battle for change."

According to The Globe and Mail Peuramaki was one of the speakers invited to address a conference on diversity in the workplace convened by the Richard Ivey School of Business at Western Ontario. Peuramaki told attendees that the modern working environment has more tools to effectively employ the skills of individuals with disabilities.

Peuramaki was a co-author of an article published in the Ivey Business Journal advising employers how to work to comply with the Accessibility for Ontarians with Disabilities Act, which requires workplaces to be fully accessible by 2025. The journal describes him as the President of Fireweed Media, which they describe as a media production company owned and operated by individuals with disabilities. They describe Peuramaki and his co-authors as possessing "extensive experience in researching and implementing workplace disability programs and initiatives". The Globe and Mail on the other hand describes him as Fireweed Media's Executive Director.

In 2002, the Highlands Video Projects Committee listed Peuramaki's expertise when they drafted a proposal to promote tourism in Haliburton County through the production of natural history and tourism videos.

Peuramaki's earliest work in the fields of publishing and media production on the public record was his work as an illustrator on a children's book, Bigfoot Betty, in 1980.

== Private life ==
Peuramaki has been listed as a member or cited observer by amateur birdwatching organizations.

In 2002 former Prime Minister of Canada Joe Clark described enjoying Peuramaki's attendance at the book launch of his new book "Building Accessible Websites".

== Awards ==
In 1994, while Peuramaki was senior producer The Disability Network won the Excellence for Television Newsmagazine Programs award, given by the California Governor's Committee for Employment of Disabled Persons, and one of the series episodes won the Best Documentary award.

On December 4, 2004, Toronto Mayor David Miller honored six individuals, including Peuramiki, with a 2006 Unsung Hero award, on the occasion of International Day of People with Disability and Human Rights Month.

In 2005 the Canadian Association of Independent Living Centres honored Peuramaki with its 2005 Consumer Award. The award is given to individuals who live in an Independent Living Centre who have overcome career barriers.
