= Magic 98.3 =

Magic 98.3 may refer to:

- WMGQ (Magic 98.3), in New Brunswick, New Jersey
- CJMK-FM (Magic 98.3), in Saskatoon, Saskatchewan, Canada
