= Cilt =

Cilt or CILT can refer to:

- Cilt, a Welsh kilt — see Kilt#Other Celtic nations
- Chartered Institute of Logistics and Transport
- CILT-FM, a music radio station in Canada
