= Saskatoon Media Group =

Canadian radio station group

629112 Saskatchewan Ltd.
- Trade name: Saskatoon Media Group
- Founder: Elmer Hildebrand
- Headquarters: Saskatoon, Saskatchewan, Canada
- Owner: Elmer Hildebrand Communications, Inc.

629112 Saskatchewan Ltd., trading as Saskatoon Media Group, is a Canadian radio broadcasting company which is based in, and owns two terrestrial radio stations in the city of Saskatoon, Saskatchewan. Its studios were formerly located in downtown Saskatoon; in 2021, it re-located to a newer facility on Robin Crescent in north Saskatoon.

The company is owned by Elmer Hildebrand Communications, Inc. They are part of the holdings of Elmer Hildebrand, which also include Golden West Broadcasting (which is held separately from the Saskatoon stations).

On November 27, 2025, Saskatoon Media Group announced that it would sell CKBL-FM to Rawlco Communications.

== Stations ==
City/Town	Call sign	Frequency	Format
Saskatoon	CJWW	600 AM	Country
Saskatoon	CJMK-FM	98.3 FM	Country/CHR
