= CJAR =

Radio station in The Pas, Manitoba

Coordinates: 53°48′46″N 101°16′35″W

- The Pas, Manitoba; Canada
- Frequencies: 1240 kHz (AM); 102.9 MHz (FM)

Ownership
- Owner: Arctic Radio Limited

History
- First air date: 1974

Technical information
- Class: C (AM); A (FM)
- Power: 1 kW AM
- ERP: 250 watts FM
- HAAT: 37.7 meters (124 ft)

Links
- Webcast: Listen Live
- Website: www.thepasonline.com/cjar.php

CJAR, known as CJ1240, is a commercial AM radio station located in The Pas, Manitoba. CJAR operates at 1240 kHz. It is part of the Arctic Radio Network (Arctic Radio (1982) Limited), with sister stations in Flin Flon (CFAR) and Thompson (CHTM). The station plays primarily adult contemporary music and broadcasts OCN Blizzard hockey games.

== History ==
In 1974, CJAR began broadcasting at 1240 kHz on the AM dial with 1,000 watts day and 500 watts night.

In 1985, CJAR was given approval by the CRTC to increase night-time power from 500 watts to 1,000 watts. That same year, CJAR disaffiliated from the CBC Radio Network. CBC service was now available in the region via CBWJ-FM.

On March 12, 2013, the CRTC approved CJAR's application to convert to the FM band at 102.9 MHz, with an effective radiated power of 250 watts, non-directional antenna with an effective HAAT of 37.7 metres. The applicant also requested permission to maintain its AM transmitter as a repeater at the current specifications in order to rebroadcast the new FM station's programming, which was granted.
