= Swift Current Airport =

Airport in Saskatchewan, Canada

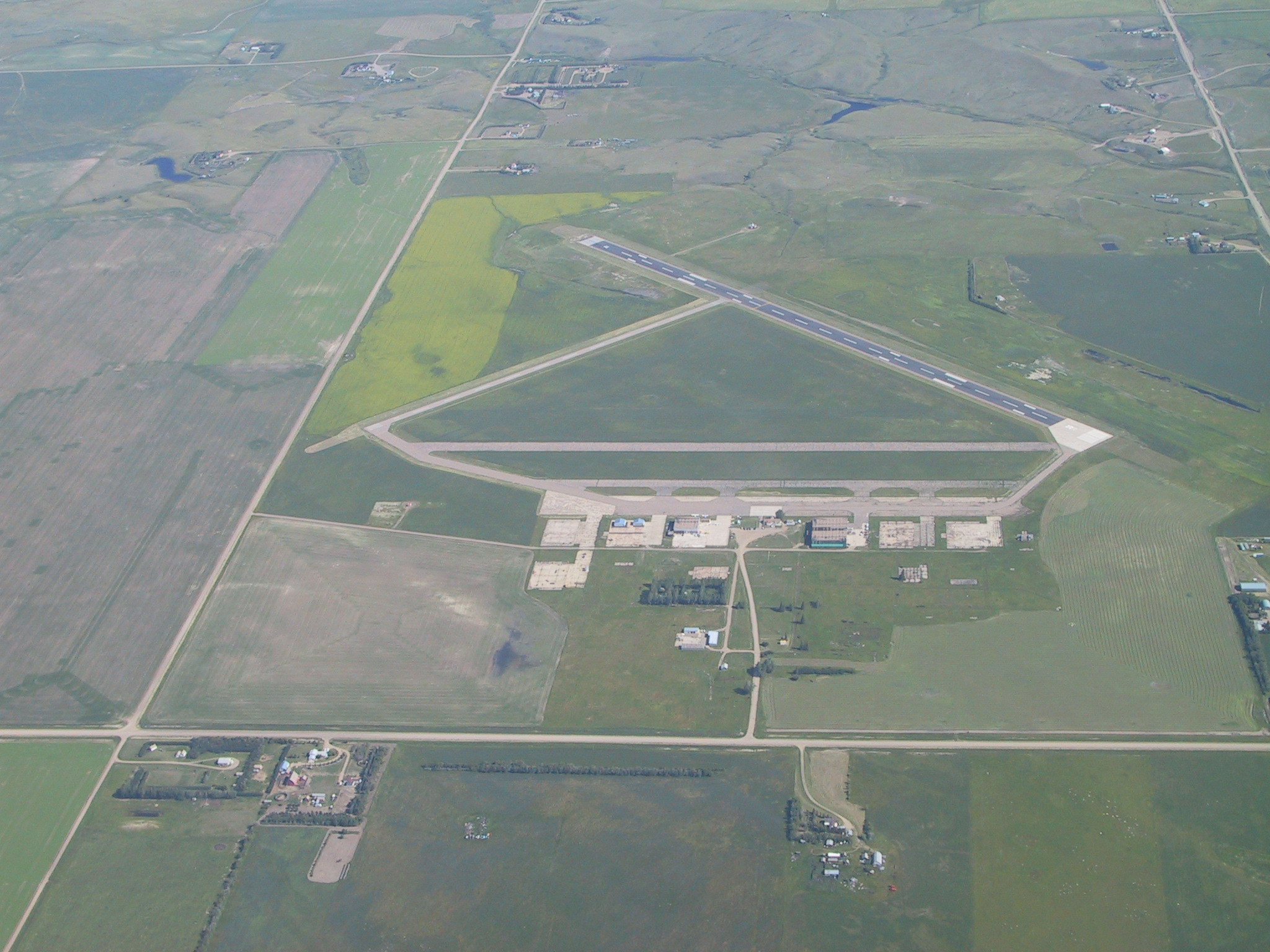
- IATA: YYN; ICAO: CYYN; WMO: 71870

Summary
- Airport type: Public
- Operator: City of Swift Current
- Location: RM of Swift Current No. 137, near Swift Current, Saskatchewan
- Time zone: CST (UTC−06:00)
- Elevation AMSL: 2,681 ft / 817 m
- Coordinates: 50°17′31″N 107°41′24″W
- Website: Swift Current Airport webpage

Map
- Location in Saskatchewan CYYN (Canada)

Runways
Direction	Length		Surface
Direction	ft	m	Surface
04/22	2,495	760	Asphalt
13/31	4,250	1,295	Asphalt

Statistics (2006)
- Aircraft movements: 4
- Source: Canada Flight Supplement; Environment Canada; Movements from Statistics Canada

Swift Current Airport (IATA: YYN, ICAO: CYYN) is located 4 nautical miles (7.4 km; 4.6 mi) east of Swift Current, Saskatchewan, Canada.

== History ==
=== 1930–1939 ===
Swift Current Airport began as a crude aerodrome in the 1930s, part of Canada's national "100-mile interval" aerodrome system.

=== 1939–1945 World War II ===
Shortly after the outbreak of WWII, a Royal Canadian Air Force Station was established at the Aerodrome and was made home to the Royal Air Force (RAF) No. 39 Service Flying Training School on 15 December 1941. The school trained RAF pilots on intermediate aircraft. No. 39 SFTS was integrated into the British Commonwealth Air Training Plan in 1942 and the school operated at the base until 24 March 1944. The base was one of more than 100 similar facilities constructed across Canada during WWII, a major infrastructure project (even by today's standards) that provided jobs for communities still reeling from the Great Depression.

Some of the infrastructure from the WWII training base remains today. The airfield layout, that is, the runways and taxiways, retains virtually the same configuration as it did originally. One of the seven original WWII hangars remains today. The building is structurally sound and has been granted a "municipal heritage site" designation. The owner is completing some restorative work to the exterior. Another notable object from WWII is the large concrete structure at the east end of the apron — it was referred to as a "25-yard firing range". A few other original buildings remain, such as the water pump house, workshop, and storage buildings. Some buildings have been re-purposed within the city.

==== Aerodrome ====
In approximately 1942 the aerodrome was listed as RCAF & D of T Aerodrome - Swift Current, Saskatchewan at 50°17′N 107°43′W with a variation of 19 degrees east and elevation of 2,670 ft (810 m). The field had six runways listed as follows:

Runway name	Length	Width	Surface
7/25	3,500 ft (1,100 m)	100 ft (30 m)	Hard surfaced
7/25	3,600 ft (1,100 m)	100 ft (30 m)	Hard surfaced
3/21	2,830 ft (860 m)	100 ft (30 m)	Hard surfaced
3/21	2,830 ft (860 m)	100 ft (30 m)	Hard surfaced
11/29	2,850 ft (870 m)	100 ft (30 m)	Hard surfaced
11/29	2,850 ft (870 m)	100 ft (30 m)	Hard surfaced

==== Relief landing field – St. Aldwyn ====
The primary relief landing field (R1) for RCAF Station Swift Current was located north of the city of Swift Current.

In approximately 1942, the aerodrome was listed as RCAF Aerodrome — St. Aldwyn, Saskatchewan at 50°23′N 107°46′W with a variation of 20 degrees east and an elevation of 2,633 ft (803 m). The relief field was laid out in a triangle with three runways, detailed in the following table:

Runway name	Length	Width	Surface
7/25	2,900 ft (880 m)	100 ft (30 m)	Hard surface
1/19	2,900 ft (880 m)	100 ft (30 m)	Hard surface
13/31	2,900 ft (880 m)	100 ft (30 m)	Hard surface

==== Relief landing field — Wymark ====
The secondary relief landing field (R2) for RCAF Station Swift Current was located northeast of the community of Wymark.

In approximately 1942 the aerodrome was listed as RCAF Aerodrome - Wymark, Saskatchewan at 50°10′N 107°43′W with a variation of 19.5 degrees east and an elevation of 2,902 ft (885 m). The relief field was laid out in a triangle with three runways and was listed as a "turf - all way field". The runways were listed as follows:

Runway name	Length	Width	Surface
13/31	3,800 ft (1,200 m)	500 ft (150 m)	Turf
7/25	3,800 ft (1,200 m)	500 ft (150 m)	Turf
1/19	3,800 ft (1,200 m)	500 ft (150 m)	Turf

=== 1945–present ===
Following the end of WWII, the airport was operated by the Department of Transport (now Transport Canada) until the late 1990s. At that time, the federal government implemented the National Airports Policy which transitioned ownership of medium-sized airports to local municipalities. The airport had scheduled passenger services in the 1950s and 60s provided by Trans-Canada Airways (now Air Canada). Over the years, the airport has served as a base for corporate aircraft, government aircraft, military aircraft, agricultural aircraft, private aircraft, flight training, aircraft maintenance, and refuelling.

== Services ==
Swift Current Airport has the following services: cardlock fuel pumps (accepting VISA, American Express and MasterCard) dispensing 100LL gasoline and Jet A-1 turbine fuel, 24-hour pilots' lounge with WiFi and washrooms, aircraft maintenance company (Craft Aviation), parking and tie-downs.

== See also ==
- List of airports in Saskatchewan
