= CIMG-FM =

Radio station in Swift Current, Saskatchewan

Coordinates: 50°16′00″N 107°54′08″W

- Swift Current, Saskatchewan; Canada
- Broadcast area: Southwest Saskatchewan
- Frequency: 94.1 MHz
- Branding: Country 94.1

Programming
- Format: Country music
- Affiliations: Swift Current Broncos

Ownership
- Owner: Golden West Broadcasting
- Sister stations: CKSW, CKFI-FM

History
- First air date: October 20, 1979

Technical information
- Class: C
- ERP: 100,000 watts
- HAAT: 137 metres (449 ft)

Links
- Webcast: Listen Live
- Website: swiftcurrentonline.com/country94

CIMG-FM is a Canadian radio station being licensed to Swift Current, Saskatchewan serving the southwest Saskatchewan area broadcasting at 94.1 FM with a country music format. The station is currently owned and operated by Golden West Broadcasting, which also owns sister stations CKFI-FM and CKSW. The station had been broadcasting since October 20, 1979.

In November 2016, CIMG's studios relocated to the top floor of Innovation Credit Union at 198 1st avenue north east in Swift Current.
