= CFAM =

Radio station in Altona, Manitoba

Coordinates: 49.03249°N 97.94916°W

- Altona, Manitoba; Canada
- Broadcast area: Pembina Valley Region
- Frequency: 950 kHz (AM)
- Branding: CFAM 950

Programming
- Format: Christian, easy listening
- Affiliations: Winnipeg Jets (NHL)

Ownership
- Owner: Golden West Broadcasting
- Sister stations: CJEL-FM, CKMW

History
- First air date: March 13, 1957
- Call sign meaning: Contains "AM" for AM radio and "Altona, Manitoba"

Technical information
- Class: B (regional)
- Power: 10,000 watts

Links
- Website: cfamradio.com

CFAM (950 AM) is a radio station licensed to Altona, Manitoba. Owned by Golden West Broadcasting, it broadcasts a full-service format serving the Pembina Valley Region, predominantly featuring Christian teaching, music, and easy listening programming.

The station's studios are co-located with sister stations CJEL-FM and CKMW-FM at 277 1st Street in Winkler, Manitoba. It also maintains a local office at the Golden West Plaza on 125 Centre Ave East in Altona, which serves as Golden West Broadcasting's corporate headquarters. CFAM is the nominal flagship of Golden West Broadcasting, which was established by Altona native and long-time CFAM employee Elmer Hildebrand after he bought the station in the 1970s.

== History ==
CFAM first began broadcasting on March 13, 1957 at 1290 kHz under the ownership of Southern Manitoba Broadcasting Co. Ltd. The station initially broadcast a broad full-service radio format, with a focus on news and community coverage, blocks of religious programming, classical music (including morning and afternoon hours, and the late-night Classics 'til Dawn), and specialized programs targeting Manitoba's Dutch, German, and Ukrainian communities.

In 1958, the station received approval to increase its power from 1,000 to 5,000 watts. In 1964, Southern Manitoba Broadcasting Co. established the sister station 1290 CHSM in Steinbach, Manitoba, which was licensed as a repeater of CFAM. In 1965, Elmer Hildebrand—who was then the sales manager for CFAM—was named the manager of CFAM and CHSM. In 1967, CFAM received approval to increase its nighttime power to 10,000 watts. In 1968, the station moved to a new tower south of Winkler, Manitoba, and relocated to its current frequency of 950.

In the 1970s, Hildebrand bought Southern Manitoba Broadcasting Co., and established further stations such as CJRB in Boissevain, Manitoba. In 1974, CHSM received authorization to begin originating its own programming. After acquiring Frontier City Broadcasting in December 1974, Southern Manitoba Broadcasting Co. was renamed Golden West Broadcasting to reflect its broader expansion into Western Canada. In 1987, Golden West acquired Winkler's CISV, relaunching it as the sister station CKMW.

In 1999, CFAM and Golden West Broadcasting re-located their headquarters to Golden West Plaza, a new multi-use development neighbouring CFAM's original studios.
