= CJMK-FM =

Radio station in Saskatoon, Saskatchewan

Coordinates: 52°10′54″N 106°23′14″W

- Saskatoon, Saskatchewan; Canada
- Broadcast area: Saskatoon Metropolitan Area
- Frequency: 98.3 MHz
- Branding: Kick 98

Programming
- Format: Country-leaning contemporary hit radio

Ownership
- Owner: Elmer Hildebrand Communications, Inc; (629112 Saskatchewan Ltd.)
- Sister stations: CJWW

History
- First air date: May 18, 2001
- Call sign meaning: From previous "Magic" branding

Technical information
- Class: C1
- ERP: 100,000 watts
- HAAT: 161.7 metres (531 ft)

Links
- Webcast: Listen Live
- Website: Kick98.com

CJMK-FM (98.3 FM, "Kick 98") is a radio station serving Saskatoon, Saskatchewan. Owned by Elmer Hildebrand Communications operating as Saskatoon Media Group, it broadcasts a country-leaning contemporary hit radio format.

== History ==
The station received approval in 2000 and CJMK was launched in 2001 by Hildebrand Communications as Magic 98.3.

Former logo as 98 Cool FM used from 2014–2026

On January 17, 2014, the station flipped from hot adult contemporary to classic hits, branded as 98 Cool FM.

On September 8, 2026, CJMK flipped to a country -leaning contemporary hit radio format as Kick 98. The relaunch came following Saskatoon Media Group's sale of its sister FM country station CKBL-FM to Rawlco, and their resulting relaunch of the station as The Grid the week prior. Program director Steve Chisholm explained that the format was intended to appeal towards Saskatoon's demographic majority (15–64, with a median age of 36–37), who were found to predominantly enjoy both country and pop music. At least 60% of the station's playlist is devoted to country music; Chisholm explained that its staff did not want Kick to be "a country station that lays a little bit of pop or a pop station that plays a little bit of country", and found that the genres "blend together extremely well.".
