= Swift Current Court House =

Court House
- Interactive map of the Court House area

General information
- Architectural style: Edwardian Classical
- Location: 121 Lorne Street West, Swift Current, Saskatchewan, Canada
- Coordinates: 50.2900°N 107.8023°W
- Construction started: 1914
- Completed: 1916

Design and construction
- Architects: Philbrick, Raymond
- Engineer: Lecky, R.J. and Company

The Swift Current Court House is a municipal designated historic building located in the city of Swift Current, Saskatchewan, Canada. The building is a two story brick building in an Edwardian Classical style made with brick from Claybank, Saskatchewan. In the early days the building also served as the land registry office.
