= CHBO-FM =

Coordinates: 52°15′30″N 105°23′11″W

- Humboldt, Saskatchewan; Canada
- Frequency: 107.5 MHz
- Branding: 107.5 Bolt FM

Programming
- Format: Hot adult contemporary

Ownership
- Owner: Golden West Broadcasting

History
- First air date: October 12, 2011
- Call sign meaning: Humboldt

Technical information
- Class: C1
- ERP: vertical polarization: 61 kW average, 100 kW peak; horizontal polarization: 59 kW average, 97 kW peak
- HAAT: 170.2 metres (558 ft)

Links
- Webcast: Listen Live
- Website: discoverhumboldt.com/bolt

CHBO-FM is a Canadian radio station broadcasting at 107.5 FM in Humboldt, Saskatchewan, with a hot adult contemporary format branded as 107.5 Bolt FM. The station is owned by Golden West Broadcasting.

== History ==
The station received CRTC approval on January 25, 2011, and was officially launched on October 12, 2011.

On April 6, 2018, CHBO's Humboldt Broncos broadcaster Tyler Bieber, and board-op/statistician Brody Hinz were two of sixteen who died in a team bus crash near Armley.
