= CJAW-FM =

Radio station in Moose Jaw

Coordinates: 50°35′44″N 105°04′12″W

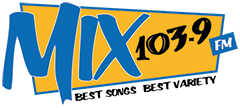
- Moose Jaw, Saskatchewan; Canada
- Broadcast area: Southern Saskatchewan
- Frequency: 103.9 MHz
- Branding: Mix 103

Programming
- Format: Hot adult contemporary

Ownership
- Owner: Golden West Broadcasting; (101142236 Saskatchewan Ltd.)
- Sister stations: CHAB, CILG-FM

History
- First air date: April 22, 2008
- Call sign meaning: Moose Jaw

Technical information
- Class: C1
- ERP: 100 kW
- HAAT: 258.6 metres (848 ft)

Links
- Website: discovermoosejaw.com/mix103

CJAW-FM is a Canadian radio station broadcasting at 103.9 FM in Moose Jaw, Saskatchewan with a hot adult contemporary format branded as Mix 103. The station is owned by Golden West Broadcasting. CJAW's studios are located at 1704 Main Street North along with sister stations CILG-FM and CHAB.

The station received approval by the CRTC in 2006. The station signed on and broadcasting commenced on Tuesday April 22, 2008 at 10:39 a.m.
