= CKSW =

Radio station in Swift Current, Saskatchewan

Coordinates: 50°09′39″N 107°49′01″W

- Swift Current, Saskatchewan; Canada
- Broadcast area: Southwestern Saskatchewan
- Frequency: 570 kHz
- Branding: CKSW 570

Programming
- Language: English
- Format: Classic hits

Ownership
- Owner: Golden West Broadcasting
- Sister stations: CKFI-FM, CIMG-FM

History
- First air date: 1956
- Former frequencies: 1400 kHz (1956–1977)

Technical information
- Class: B
- Power: 10,000 watts

Links
- Website: swiftcurrentonline.com/cksw

CKSW (570 AM) is a radio station in Canada broadcasting a classic hits format. Licensed to Swift Current, Saskatchewan, it serves southwestern Saskatchewan. It first began broadcasting in 1956 at 1400 before moving to its current frequency of 570 in 1977. The station is currently owned by Golden West Broadcasting.

The station celebrated its 50th anniversary in July 2006 with a one-day music festival in the city's Riverside Park. Among the performers at the outdoor event was Saskatchewan-born country singer Brad Johner. The event had an attendance of over 2000.

CKSW has been home to several notable Canadian radio presenters, such as Wilf Gilbey, Lenn Enns, Darwin Gooding, Regan Bartel, Garth Materie, Trent Redekop, Ken Audette, Eric Rosenbaum, Lowell Thomas and most notably, Art Wallman who is in the Canadian Country Music Hall of Fame.

CKSW resides with 2 sister stations; CKFI-FM and CIMG-FM, in the same building at 198-1st Ave NE in Swift Current.

On November 15, 2023, CKSW flipped to classic hits, networking with all other Golden West AM stations in Saskatchewan. The country format moved to CIMG-FM.
