= CJXR-FM =

Radio station in Steinbach, Manitoba

Coordinates: 49.529450°N 96.692161°W

- Steinbach, Manitoba; Canada
- Frequency: 107.7 MHz (FM)
- Branding: Country 107.7

Programming
- Language: English
- Format: Country

Ownership
- Owner: Golden West Broadcasting
- Sister stations: CHSM, CILT-FM

History
- First air date: June 19, 2014

Technical information
- Class: B
- ERP: 30 kWs
- HAAT: 117.4 meters (385 ft)

Links
- Website: steinbachonline.com/radio/country-107-7-fm

CJXR-FM, branded as Country 107.7, is a radio station which broadcasts a country format on 107.7 FM in Steinbach, Manitoba, Canada. The station, owned by Golden West Broadcasting, received approval from the Canadian Radio-television and Telecommunications Commission (CRTC) on June 28, 2013. The station broadcasts with an effective radiated power of 30,000 watts (non-directional antenna with an effective height of antenna above average terrain of 117.4 metres).
