= CJVM-FM =

Coordinates: 49.8567°N 100.9666°W

- Virden, Manitoba; Canada
- Frequency: 103.3 MHz
- Branding: CJ 103

Programming
- Format: Adult Contemporary/Country

Ownership
- Owner: 5777152 Manitoba Ltd.
- Sister stations: CJBP-FM, CJSB-FM, CJIE-FM

History
- First air date: 2014

Technical information
- Class: A
- ERP: 3.44 kW
- HAAT: 38 metres (125 ft)

Links
- Webcast: CJ103 Webstream
- Website: www.cj103radio.com

CJVM-FM, is a Manitoba radio station which broadcasts a country, rock, pop and oldies format on the frequency 103.3 MHz in Virden, Manitoba, Canada.

Owned by 5777152 Manitoba Ltd. which is wholly owned and controlled by Mr. William Gade, the station received CRTC on October 14, 2010.

The station launched on September 4, 2014 at 6AM with full programming.
