= CJSN =

Radio station in Shaunavon, Saskatchewan

Coordinates: 49°38′29″N 108°29′15″W

- Shaunavon, Saskatchewan; Canada
- Broadcast area: Southwestern Saskatchewan
- Frequency: 1490 kHz (AM)
- Branding: CJSN 1490

Programming
- Format: Classic hits

Ownership
- Owner: Golden West Broadcasting

History
- First air date: 1966

Technical information
- Class: C
- Power: 1,000 watts

Links
- Website: swiftcurrentonline.com/cjsn

CJSN (1490 AM) is a radio station broadcasting a classic hits format. Licensed to Shaunavon, Saskatchewan, it serves southwestern Saskatchewan. It first began broadcasting in 1966. The station is currently owned by Golden West Broadcasting.
