= CILG-FM =

Radio station in Moose Jaw

Coordinates: 50°35′44″N 105°04′12″W

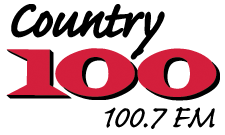
- Moose Jaw, Saskatchewan; Canada
- Broadcast area: Southern Saskatchewan
- Frequency: 100.7 MHz
- Branding: Country 100

Programming
- Format: Country
- Affiliations: Moose Jaw Warriors

Ownership
- Owner: Golden West Broadcasting
- Sister stations: CHAB, CJAW-FM

History
- First air date: July 23, 2002

Technical information
- Class: C
- ERP: 100,000 watts
- HAAT: 258.6 metres (848 ft)

Links
- Website: discovermoosejaw.com/country100

CILG-FM is a Canadian radio station broadcasting a country format at 100.7 FM. Licensed to Moose Jaw, Saskatchewan, it serves south-central Saskatchewan. It first began broadcasting in 2002. The station is currently owned by Golden West Broadcasting. All three Golden West Broadcasting stations in Moose Jaw share studios at 1704 Main Street North.

CILG serves as the broadcasting home of the Moose Jaw Warriors of the Western Hockey League.

In the 1980s, the 100.7 frequency was assigned to the CKO network, which folded in 1989 before the Regina station had a chance to open.

On March 29, 2010, 101142236 Saskatchewan Ltd. received CRTC approval to acquire Golden West Broadcasting which owns CHAB, and its sister stations CILG-FM and CJAW-FM.

2021- Nominated for CCMA for Radio Station of the Year for small/medium market
