= CJUV-FM =

Radio station in Lacombe, Alberta

Coordinates: 52°18′43″N 113°57′32″W

- Lacombe, Alberta; Canada
- Broadcast area: Central Alberta
- Frequency: 94.1 MHz
- Branding: Sunny 94

Programming
- Language: English
- Format: Classic hits/Oldies

Ownership
- Owner: Golden West Broadcasting

History
- First air date: June 28, 2006

Technical information
- Class: C1
- ERP: 26,000 watts average 55,000 watts peak
- HAAT: 161 metres (528 ft)

Links
- Webcast: Listen Live
- Website: lacombeonline.com/sunny

CJUV-FM is a Canadian radio station that broadcasts a classic hits format at 94.1 FM in Lacombe, Alberta.

In December 2015, the station was sold by its founder, L.A. Radio Group, to Golden West Broadcasting.
