= Canstar Community Newspapers =

Newspaper company in Winnipeg, Canada

Canstar Community News is a newspaper company in Winnipeg, Manitoba, Canada. It owns and operates two community newspapers in the Winnipeg area.

== History ==
Five of those newspapers, The Lance, The Metro, The Herald, The Headliner and The Times began as neighbourhood papers as early as 1917. Over the course of years, they became part of the Transcontinental Media newspaper company. In 2004, the papers were sold by Transcontinental to FP Canadian Newspapers, owners of the Winnipeg Free Press. Included in the deal were flyer distribution operations in Brandon and Thunder Bay. The new company was rebranded as Canstar Community News.

In 2009, The Lance Started by Editor Wes Rowson was divided into two community newspapers to better cover the expanding and developing Winnipeg South area, and The Sou'wester was born.

Two niche publications, Uptown Magazine, an alternative news-and-entertainment weekly, and The Prime Times, a seniors' paper, were purchased from Rosebud Communications in 2005. The Prime Times ceased publication in November 2011 and Canstar and FP Canadian Newspapers launched a bi-monthly magazine, Winnipeg Boomer, on Nov. 26, 2011. Winnipeg Boomer ceased publication with its October 2012 issue and Uptown Magazine ceased publication as a standalone weekly newspaper on Oct. 25, 2012. It was relaunched as a section of the Thursday edition of the Winnipeg Free Press on Nov. 1, 2012.

In 2007, the newspapers' website, www.weeklies.ca, won first place, for best website in class, at the Canadian Community Newspaper Association (CCNA) awards. That website no longer exists, as the papers are now accessed through a new URL, canstarnews.com, or via the Winnipeg Free Press website.

In March 2007, the employees of Canstar Community News had a vote to determine union membership in the Communications, Energy and Paperworkers Union. The results of the vote have not been released, however, the employees did form a union.

Beginning in 2022, Canstar reduced the number of titles it operates from six to two with the creation of the East and West editions of the Free Press Community Review. Coverage areas of the new publications are divided by the Red River, which flows south to north through the city of Winnipeg. Circulation of the new publications was 215,000+ in 2022.
