= CJWV-FM (Winnipeg) =

Former radio station in Winnipeg

- Winnipeg, Manitoba; Canada
- Frequency: 107.9 MHz
- Branding: Flava 107.9

Programming
- Format: Urban contemporary

Ownership
- Owner: Harmony Broadcasting Ltd.

History
- First air date: 2002
- Last air date: December 2007

Technical information
- ERP: 200 watts

CJWV-FM is a former radio station in Winnipeg, Manitoba that broadcast at 200 watts. It was known on-air as Flava 107.9.

CJWV-FM was owned by the now dissolved Harmony Broadcasting Corporation. It was originally licensed in 2002 as an instructional campus radio station in conjunction with Winnipeg Technical College, but this agreement was discontinued in 2004.

== Controversy ==
In 2006, the station was called before the Canadian Radio-television and Telecommunications Commission after a number of listener complaints its non-compliance with several conditions of its license, including its instructional affiliation, its musical playlist and the non-provision of logger tapes to the CRTC. The prime intervenor in these proceedings was Martin Boroditsky, an investigative journalist who had been hired before the renewal of the licence to provide required spoken word programming, and who was mainly concerned with the conversion to a commercial music and promotion format and the total absence of any enrolled broadcasting students. During the hearing the CRTC expressed the same concerns about serious violations of the requirements of the licence as a non-profit campus station. The intervenor also alleged that CRTC staff had missed serious irregularities in the corporate records which indicated the directors who were granted the renewal, did not legally exist and never controlled the operation of the station.

Soon after the hearing, the intervenor resumed his talk show program in the drive slot on weekdays, at the invitation of another campus station in the market.

On September 4, 2007, the station, which had lost its lease on the existing studio space, moved to an undisclosed location.

Just prior to Christmas, 2007, the station went dark. An application by David Asper to acquire the station and to affiliate it with Robertson College, was filed with the CRTC in 2008.

However, due to continued noncompliance with several commission-imposed mandatory orders, the station's licence was revoked by the CRTC in July 2008.

Following the revocation of CJWV's license, CJNU-FM would relocate from 104.7 to 107.9; that station would later move to 93.7 in September 2013. The former CJWV-FM call sign now belongs to a radio station in Peterborough, Ontario.
