= CKMW-FM =

Radio station in Morden, Manitoba

Coordinates: 49°07′16″N 98°04′03″W

- Winkler, Manitoba; Canada
- Broadcast area: Pembina Valley Region
- Frequency: 88.9 MHz
- Branding: Country 88

Programming
- Format: Country

Ownership
- Owner: Golden West Broadcasting
- Sister stations: CFAM, CJEL-FM

History
- First air date: August 1, 1980
- Former call signs: CISV (1980–1987)
- Former frequencies: 1530 kHz (AM) (1980–1987); 1570 kHz (1987–2013)
- Call sign meaning: Morden and Winkler

Technical information
- Class: C1
- ERP: 67,000 watts (vertical polarization); 100,000 watts (horizontal polarization)
- HAAT: 55.5 meters (182 ft)

Links
- Website: pembinavalleyonline.com/country88

CKMW-FM is a Canadian radio station licensed to Winkler, Manitoba, serving the Pembina Valley Region broadcasting at 88.9 FM with a country format branded as Country 88. The station is currently owned & operated by Golden West Broadcasting.

CKMW shares its location with sister stations CJEL-FM and CFAM.

== History ==
It first began broadcasting at 6 a.m. on August 1, 1980 at 1530 kHz with the call sign CISV.

In 1987, CISV received approval to relocate to 1570 kHz, and increase its nighttime power to 10,000 watts to match its daytime power. After facing significant financial difficulties, Sun Valley Radio sold CISV to Golden West Broadcasting, owner of CFAM in nearby Altona. Sun Valley had faced issues selling the station as a standalone operation, and Golden West told the CRTC that acquiring the station would allow it to benefit from its larger scale and sharing of newsgathering resources with CFAM, while having its country music format act as a compliment to CFAM's full-service format. Golden West constructed new facilities for the station, and re-christened it CKMW.

=== Move to FM ===
On July 16, 2012, Golden West received approval from CRTC to convert CKMW from the AM band to the FM band. The new frequency previously assigned was 103.7 MHz. On January 8, 2013, the CRTC granted permission for CKMW to broadcast instead on 88.9 MHz, as well as increasing the average effective radiated power (ERP) from 61,000 to 100,000 watts (maximum ERP remains at 100,000 watts) and changing from a directional to a non-directional antenna. The station relaunched as Country 88.9 at 88.9 FM on June 12, 2013. Following its move to FM, CKMW was permitted to simulcast on both AM and FM for a transition period of three months, ending in September; the station ceased broadcasting on AM 1570 on August 30, 2013.
