= CFAR-FM =

Radio station in Flin Flon, Manitoba, Canada

Coordinates: 54°48′4″N 101°51′9″W

- Flin Flon, Manitoba; Canada
- Frequency: 102.9 MHz

Programming
- Affiliations: CBC (1937–1984); Flin Flon Bombers

Ownership
- Owner: Arctic Radio Limited

History
- First air date: 1937
- Call sign meaning: Arctic Radio

Technical information
- Class: A
- ERP: 600 watts
- HAAT: 27.7 metres (91 ft)
- Repeater: CFAR (AM) 590 kHz

Links
- Webcast: Listen live (via TuneIn)
- Website: flinflononline.com/cfar.php

CFAR-FM is a Canadian radio station that operates at 102.9 FM and 590 AM, located in Flin Flon, Manitoba. The FM station broadcasts with 600 watts; the AM station broadcasts with a daytime transmitter power of 10,000 watts and at nighttime at 1,000 watts.

It is part of the Arctic Radio Network (Arctic Radio (1982) Limited), with sister stations in The Pas (CJAR) and Thompson (CHTM).

The station plays primarily adult contemporary music and Flin Flon Bombers ice hockey games.

== History ==
The radio station originally began broadcasting at 1370 kHz on the AM dial in 1937. It moved to 1400 kHz in 1941, 1230 kHz in 1944, and 590 kHz in 1946.

Over the years, CFAR went through different ownerships and formats. CFAR was an affiliate of the Canadian Broadcasting Corporation and its Trans-Canada Network and then CBC Radio until 1984.

On March 12, 2013, the CRTC approved CFAR's application to convert to the FM band at 102.9 MHz, with an effective radiated power of 600 watts, non-directional antenna with an effective HAAT of 27.7 metres. The applicant also requested permission to maintain its AM transmitter as a repeater at the current specifications in order to rebroadcast the new FM station's programming, which was granted.

== Personalities ==
- Larry Thor, singer and writer (1937–40)
