= CJIE-FM =

Radio station in Manitoba

Coordinates: 50°30′21″N 97°00′02″W

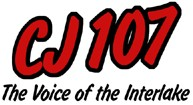
- Gimli, Manitoba; Canada
- Broadcast area: Gimli, Manitoba
- Frequency: 107.5 MHz
- Branding: "CJ 107"

Programming
- Format: Country

Ownership
- Owner: 5777152 Manitoba
- Sister stations: CJSB-FM, CJBP-FM, CJVM-FM

History
- First air date: June 2011
- Call sign meaning: C J Interlake; East

Technical information
- Class: A
- ERP: 1,620 watts
- HAAT: 59 meters (194 ft)

Links
- Webcast: CJ 107 Webstream
- Website: www.cj107radio.com

CJIE-FM is a Canadian radio station which broadcasts a country/pop/rock format on the frequency of 107.5 MHz in Winnipeg Beach, Manitoba and rebroadcasts its signal via 99.5 CJIE-FM-1 in Arborg, Manitoba, Canada.

== History ==
Owned by 5777152 Manitoba Ltd., the station received CRTC approval on February 10, 2010 but was required to select a frequency other than the proposed 93.7 MHz. A frequency of 107.5 MHz was approved on July 28, 2010.

Launched in June 2011, the station boasts a high content and quality of local news items and interesting interviews. CJIE-FM proudly lives up to its logo, "The Voice of the Interlake." The studio is located in the heart of Gimli, on the boardwalk at 10 Centre Street.

In the autumn of 2012, CJIE-FM was nominated for, and won, a prestigious award from the Interlake Tourism Association, for their contributions in promoting the Interlake.
