= CKFI-FM =

Radio station in Swift Current, Saskatchewan

Coordinates: 50°16′00″N 107°54′08″W

- Swift Current, Saskatchewan; Canada
- Broadcast area: Southwestern Saskatchewan
- Frequency: 97.1 MHz
- Branding: Magic 97

Programming
- Format: Hot adult contemporary

Ownership
- Owner: Golden West Broadcasting
- Sister stations: CKSW, CIMG-FM

History
- First air date: 2005

Technical information
- Class: C1
- ERP: 42.9 kW vertical polarization 100 kW horizontal polarization
- HAAT: 140.4 metres (461 ft)

Links
- Website: swiftcurrentonline.com/radio/magic97

CKFI-FM is a Canadian radio station licensed to Swift Current, Saskatchewan, serving the southwestern Saskatchewan area broadcasting at 97.1 FM with a hot adult contemporary format branded as Magic 97.

The station is currently owned and operated by Golden West Broadcasting which also sister stations CKSW and CIMG-FM.

The station received approval by the CRTC on February 3, 2005 and began broadcasting later that year. CKFI's studios are located at 134 Central Avenue North in Swift Current, Saskatchewan. In November 2016, the station moved to the top floor of the Innovation Credit Union Building.
