= CHEB-FM =

Radio station in Winnipeg, Canada

- Winnipeg, Manitoba; Canada
- Broadcast area: Winnipeg Metropolitan Region
- Frequency: 88.7 MHz
- Branding: U Radio 88.7

Programming
- Language: Multilingual
- Format: Community radio

Ownership
- Owner: U Multicultural Inc.

History
- First air date: January 2026

Technical information
- Licensing authority: CRTC
- Class: A
- ERP: 800 watts
- HAAT: 141.8 metres (465 ft)

CHEB-FM (88.7 FM, "U Radio 88.7") is a radio station in Winnipeg, Manitoba, Canada, which launched in 2026. Owned and operated by the not-for-profit U Multicultural Inc., the station broadcasts a multilingual community radio format, with programming in English, French, Cree, Inuktitut, Ojibwe, Dakota, Swahili, Arabic, Ukrainian, Spanish, Tagalog and other languages for the city's multicultural communities.

The station originally launched as an Internet radio service, before applying for a broadcasting license from the Canadian Radio-television and Telecommunications Commission. Its application was approved in February 2024, and the station began test broadcasts in October 2025 before officially launching in January 2026.
