= CHTM =

Radio station in Thompson, Manitoba

Coordinates: 55°42′08″N 97°52′56″W

- Thompson, Manitoba; Canada
- Frequencies: 610 kHz (AM); 102.9 MHz (FM)

Programming
- Format: Adult contemporary

Ownership
- Owner: Arctic Radio Limited

History
- First air date: 1964
- Call sign meaning: C H Thompson, Manitoba

Technical information
- Class: B (AM); A1 (FM)
- Power: 1,000 watts (AM)
- ERP: 190 watts (FM)
- HAAT: 95.8 meters (314 ft)

Links
- Webcast: listen online
- Website: CHTM

CHTM is a commercial radio station located in Thompson, Manitoba. The station operates at 610 AM. It is part of the Arctic Radio (1982) Limited, with sister stations in Flin Flon (CFAR) and The Pas (CJAR). The station plays primarily adult contemporary music.

== History ==
In March 1964, Mystery Lake Broadcasting Ltd. opened CHTM at 610 KHz on the AM band with a power of 1,000 watts daytime and nighttime; it is a Class B, AM station broadcasting on a regional frequency. CHTM was an independent station with no network affiliation. The "TM" in the call sign: Thompson, Manitoba.

Over the years, the station went through various ownerships and formats. Most recently, on July 26, 1982, Doug O'Brien, on behalf of a company to be incorporated (would be known as Arctic Radio (1982) Ltd. was given permission to purchase CFAR, CJAR and CHTM from the existing shareholders (Arctic Radio Co. Ltd.). O'Brien took ownership on September 1. At the same time, Arctic was given approval to purchase CKOM in Saskatoon; however, it is uncertain the transaction was carried out. O'Brien took ownership of the Arctic stations on September 1.

On March 12, 2013, the CRTC approved CHTM's application to convert to the FM band at 102.9 MHz, with an effective radiated power of 190 watts, non-directional antenna with an effective HAAT of 95.8 metres. The applicant also requested permission to maintain its AM transmitter as a repeater at the current specifications in order to rebroadcast the new FM station's programming, which was granted.
