= CJEL-FM =

Radio station in Winkler, Manitoba

Coordinates: 49°07′16″N 98°04′03″W

- Winkler, Manitoba; Canada
- Broadcast area: Pembina Valley Region
- Frequency: 93.5 MHz
- Branding: The Eagle 93.5

Programming
- Format: Hot adult contemporary

Ownership
- Owner: Golden West Broadcasting
- Sister stations: CFAM, CKMW-FM

History
- First air date: 2000

Technical information
- Class: C2
- ERP: 100,000 watts
- HAAT: 51.7 metres (170 ft)

Links
- Website: pembinavalleyonline.com/eagle935

CJEL-FM is a Canadian radio station being licensed to Winkler, Manitoba, and serving the Pembina Valley region of Manitoba broadcasting at 93.5 FM. The station airs a hot adult contemporary format branded on-air as The Eagle 93.5 and is owned by Golden West Broadcasting.

== History ==
On October 19, 1999, Golden West Broadcasting Ltd. received approval by the Canadian Radio-television and Telecommunications Commission (CRTC) for a new English-language FM radio station programming undertaking at Winkler. The new station would broadcast on the frequency 93.5 MHz with an effective radiated power of 100,000 watts.

It first began broadcasting in 2000. The station is currently owned by Golden West Broadcasting.

CJEL shares its location with sister stations CKMW-FM and CFAM.
