= CIUR-FM =

Radio station in Winnipeg

Coordinates: 49°52′44″N 97°09′03″W

- Winnipeg, Manitoba; Canada
- Broadcast area: Winnipeg Metropolitan Region
- Frequency: 104.7 MHz
- Branding: ziibi 104.7

Programming
- Format: Rhythmic adult contemporary; First Nations community radio

Ownership
- Owner: Native Communications
- Sister stations: CICY-FM

History
- First air date: December 14, 2009
- Call sign meaning: "Indigenous Urban Radio"

Technical information
- Class: A
- ERP: 1,200 watts vertical 3,000 watts horizontal
- HAAT: 121.6 metres (399 ft)

Links
- Webcast: https://201.netromedia.com/NCIFM2/NCIFM2/playlist.m3u8 (HLS) , https://player.netromedia.com/?ID=f00eb183-cc48-4151-b763-92962277f8aa&radio=true&html5=true ,| https://www.ziibi1047.com/ , http://178.netromedia.com:8000/5 (Shoutcast 2)
- Website: https://www.ziibi1047.com/

CIUR-FM (104.7 FM, "ziibi 104.7") is a First Nations radio station in Winnipeg, Manitoba. Owned by Native Communications, Inc. (NCI), it broadcasts a rhythmic adult contemporary format serving Manitoba's Indigenous communities in Winnipeg.

The station's studios are located at 1507 Inkster Blvd along with sister station CICY-FM, while its transmitter is located at 55 Nassau Street in the Roslyn neighbourhood of Winnipeg.

== History ==
In June 2008, the CRTC considered four applications for new radio stations in Winnipeg. Among them, the CRTC approved an application from Native Communications, Inc. (NCI) for a new First Nations radio station on 104.7 FM in Winnipeg, which would act as a sister station to the NCI FM network (which broadcasts locally on 105.5 FM from Selkirk) and carry contemporary music targeting an Indigenous young adult audience.

The station began testing its signal in early 2009, and launched on December 14 with an urban contemporary format branded as Streetz 104.7. Primarily targeting First Nations youth, Streetz would feature a mix of mainstream hip-hop hits, as well as Indigenous hip-hop from Native American and global First Nations communities. At least 40% of the music played by CIUR would be by Canadian Indigenous musicians, while one of its launch programs was presented in the Oji-Cree language.

On April 7, 2014, CIUR-FM flipped to rhythmic adult contemporary as Rhythm 104.7. The new format would feature "contemporary rhythmic hits and R&B classics", and targeted adult listeners 25–40.

On July 9, 2016, at midnight, CIUR-FM flipped to country music as NOW Country 104.7; the station would feature a new country format, and highlight Manitoban and Indigenous country acts.

On April 20, 2026, CIUR-FM returned to rhythmic adult contemporary as Ziibi 104.7 ("ziibi" is the Anishinaabemowin and Cree word for "river"); NCI stated that the relaunch was "a return to the original vision for the frequency: radio that reflects the voices, culture, and lived experience of Indigenous people who are at the core of the city's history", and reduced redundancy with the main NCI network (which also primarily carries country music).
