= CBWK-FM =

CBC Radio One station in Manitoba, Canada

- Thompson, Manitoba; Canada
- Broadcast area: Northern Manitoba
- Frequency: 100.9 MHz

Programming
- Format: News/Talk
- Network: CBC Radio One

Ownership
- Owner: Canadian Broadcasting Corporation

History
- First air date: 1980
- Call sign meaning: Canadian Broadcasting Corporation Winnipeg K

Technical information
- Class: A1
- ERP: 94 watts
- HAAT: 76 metres

Links
- Website: CBC Manitoba

CBWK-FM is the callsign of the CBC Radio One station in Thompson, Manitoba. The station broadcasts at 100.9 MHz. The station's studios are located on Selkirk Avenue in Thompson.

== History ==
The station signed on in 1980. Although separately licensed, for all intents and purposes it was a rebroadcaster of Winnipeg's CBW. It was upgraded to a full CBC production centre in 1994 to improve local service in rural northern Manitoba. The station also formerly produced a special evening program for the region's large First Nations population, in conjunction with Native Communications, but with the launch of NCI's own radio network this has been discontinued.

== Local programming ==
CBWK formerly aired a local morning and midday show called North Country. Hosted by Mark Szyszlo for most of its history, his departure left the program on hiatus, with the station instead simulcasting local programming from CBW Winnipeg, until Ramraajh Sharvendiran was named its new host in October 2018.

Sharvendiran was subsequently transferred to St. John's, Newfoundland and Labrador, in 2020, again leaving the program hostless and returning CBW programming to the station.

== Rebroadcasters ==
Rebroadcasters of CBWK-FM
| City of licence | Identifier | Frequency | Power | Class | RECNet | Notes |
|---|---|---|---|---|---|---|
| Brochet | CBDE-FM | 105.1 FM | 86 watts | A1 | Query | 57°53′3.12″N 101°40′19.20″W |
| Churchill | CHFC | 1230 AM | 250 watts | B | Query | 58°45′18″N 94°5′39.84″W |
| Cranberry Portage | CBWU-FM | 88.9 FM | 40 watts | A1 | Query | 54°34′58.08″N 101°22′26.40″W |
| Easterville | CBWE-FM | 95.5 FM | 86 watts | A1 | Query | 53°6′28.08″N 99°49′6.96″W |
| Flin Flon | CBWF-FM | 90.9 FM | 55 watts | A | Query | 54°47′16.08″N 101°50′38.40″W |
| Gillam | CBWG-FM | 99.9 FM | 54 watts | A | Query | 56°20′48.12″N 94°42′24.12″W |
| Gods Lake Narrows | CBWN-FM | 99.9 FM | 456 watts | A | Query | 54°32′54.96″N 94°27′41.04″W |
| Grand Rapids | CBWH-FM | 101.5 FM | 69 watts | A1 | Query | 53°9′0″N 99°17′31.92″W |
| Ilford | CBWI-FM | 94.7 FM | 86 watts | A1 | Query | 56°4′3″N 95°35′56.04″W |
| Leaf Rapids | CBWP-FM | 94.5 FM | 74 watts | A1 | Query | 56°26′30.12″N 100°2′31.20″W |
| Lynn Lake | CBDU-FM | 95.1 FM | 45 watts | LP | Query | 56°51′2.88″N 101°2′52.80″W |
| Moose Lake | CBWC-FM | 99.9 FM | 80 watts | A1 | Query | 53°42′24.84″N 100°19′22.80″W |
| Nelson House | CBWO-FM | 93.7 FM | 85 watts | A1 | Query | 55°47′26.88″N 98°52′54.12″W |
| Oxford House | CBWM-FM | 95.5 FM | 78 watts | A1 | Query | 54°55′54.84″N 95°18′15.84″W |
| The Pas | CBWJ-FM | 94.5 FM | 76 watts | A1 | Query | 53°50′8.88″N 101°15′10.80″W |
| Poplar River | CBDI-FM | 103.5 FM | 84 watts | A1 | Query | 52°59′39.12″N 97°16′41.88″W |
| Pukatawagan | CBDS-FM | 102.5 FM | 200 watts | A1 | Query | 55°44′24″N 101°19′40.80″W |
| Shamattawa | CBDG-FM | 105.1 FM | 86 watts | A1 | Query | 55°51′19.08″N 92°5′7.08″W |
| Snow Lake | CBWL-FM | 95.5 FM | 60 watts | A1 | Query | 54°52′30″N 100°0′50.40″W |
| South Indian Lake | CBWQ-FM | 95.5 FM | 66 watts | A1 | Query | 56°48′2.16″N 98°56′16.08″W |
| Waasagomach | CBWD-FM | 105.1 FM | 912 watts | A | Query | 53°53′33″N 94°56′58.92″W |
| Wabowden | CBWB-FM | 90.5 FM | 66 watts | A1 | Query | 54°54′9″N 98°37′54.84″W |

Two transmitters also rebroadcast the programming of CBWK-FM, but are owned by local community groups rather than by the CBC.

Rebroadcasters of CBWK-FM
| City of licence | Identifier | Frequency | Power | Class | RECNet | Notes |
|---|---|---|---|---|---|---|
| Cross Lake | CFNC | 1490 AM | 50 watts | LP | Query | 54°37′27.84″N 97°46′57″W |
| Lac Brochet | VF2106 | 96.9 FM | 9 watts | LP | Query | 58°37′8.04″N 101°29′16.80″W |

== Notable on-air personalities ==
The National anchor Peter Mansbridge began his broadcasting and CBC career at CHFC from 1968 to 1971.

== Notes ==
CHFC, a radio station which was originally launched in 1948 at Churchill, became a rebroadcaster of CBWK-FM in 2001.
