= CKCL-FM =

Radio station in Winnipeg

Coordinates: 49°46′15″N 97°30′37″W

- Winnipeg, Manitoba; Canada
- Broadcast area: Winnipeg Metropolitan Region
- Frequency: 107.1 MHz
- Branding: Classic 107

Programming
- Format: Classical/Jazz

Ownership
- Owner: Golden West Broadcasting
- Sister stations: CHVN-FM

History
- First air date: October 21, 1999
- Former call signs: CFEQ-FM (1999–2013)
- Former frequencies: 93.5 MHz (1999–2000)
- Call sign meaning: Sounds like "classical"

Technical information
- Class: C1
- ERP: 100,000 watts
- HAAT: 223 metres (732 ft)

Links
- Webcast: Listen Live
- Website: classic107.com

CKCL-FM (107.1 MHz, Classic 107) is a commercial radio station in Winnipeg, Manitoba. Owned by Golden West Broadcasting, it broadcasts classical and jazz music.

CKCL's studios and offices are located at 741 St. Mary's Road in St. Vital. Its transmitter is on Provincial Trunk Highway 2 near Route 424 in Springstein, Manitoba. CKCL-FM is one of only a handful of commercially licensed Classical stations in North America.

== History ==
=== As FREQ 107 ===
In 1999, Christian Solutions Group Inc. received Canadian Radio-television and Telecommunications Commission (CRTC) approval to operate CFEQ-FM, an English-language Christian rock station. It was a specialty low power radio station at 93.5 FM, broadcasting at 22 watts. In 2000, CFEQ moved from 93.5 to 107.1 FM. The station branded as FREQ-FM. A year later, the station's licence was revoked by request of the owner of Christian Solutions Group.

In 2002, HIS Broadcasting—a company led by the station's previous manager Tom Hibert, and later renamed Kesitah Inc.—received CRTC approval to launch a Contemporary Christian music station, targeted towards youth and young adults, on the same frequency as the former CFEQ. The new station retained the CFEQ-FM and FREQ branding, as FREQ 107,

The station initially broadcast a CCM format, but it later adopted a secular, modern rock-leaning presentation in an attempt to become more competitive with commercial stations in the market, positioning itself as "Winnipeg's New Rock Alternative" to downplay its status as a Christian station. As the station's CRTC license still required at least 95% of music played weekly to be "non-classic religious music", Kesitah relied on a broad interpretation of the category.

The ploy was unsuccessful, as secular advertisers were not interested in advertising on what was still otherwise a Christian station, and faith-based advertisers objected to its "liberal" and "non-traditional" presentation. Kesitah later sought a license amendment from the CRTC to reduce this quota to 31%. The company argued that there was limited listener interest in religious music, and that the station's small youth audience and difficulty attracting advertisers was making it unprofitable. It argued that a predominantly-secular format would allow CFEQ to be more competitive with other commercial stations in the market.

The amendment was denied by the CRTC in 2006, citing that the station's original approval was on the basis that it would be a Christian music station, and that allowing it to compete directly with mainstream stations would undermine the CRTC's competitive licensing process.

=== Acquisition by Golden West, flip to classical ===
Logo as Ignite 107, used from 2008-2013.

In early 2008, Golden West Broadcasting acquired Kesitah, making CFEQ a sister station to Winnipeg's other Christian music station, CHVN-FM. On September 29, 2008, CFEQ-FM flipped to Christian CHR as Ignite 107. On February 14, 2011, Golden West applied for a major increase in CFEQ-FM's effective radiated power, going from 920 watts to 100,000 watts. The CRTC granted approval on October 7, 2011.

On April 8, 2013, the CRTC approved a request by Golden West to convert CFEQ to a specialty music format focusing on classical music. Golden West stated that the station had continued to be unprofitable, and cited Winnipeg's position as a "cultural centre" of Canada, as well as CBC Radio 2's shift away from classical music, as providing a potential audience. The CRTC approved the application, ruling that the new format would increase the diversity of the market, and that CHVN would be able to supplant CFEQ's former role as a Christian station. The new station, carrying the CKCL-FM call sign and the Classic 107 name, launched at 10 a.m. on December 5, 2013.

In late 2019, the station's studio moved from its former location at 20 St. Mary's Road in St. Boniface to 1-741 St. Mary's Road in St. Vital, co-locating with sister station CHVN-FM.
