= CHVN-FM =

Radio station in Winnipeg

Coordinates: 49°46′15″N 97°30′37″W

- Winnipeg, Manitoba; Canada
- Broadcast area: Winnipeg Metropolitan Region
- Frequency: 95.1 MHz
- Branding: CHVN 95.1

Programming
- Format: Contemporary Christian music

Ownership
- Owner: Golden West Broadcasting
- Sister stations: CKCL-FM

History
- Call sign meaning: "Heaven"

Technical information
- Class: C1
- ERP: 100,000 watts
- HAAT: 223 metres (732 ft)

Links
- Website: chvnradio.com

CHVN-FM (95.1 FM) is a commercial radio station in Winnipeg, Manitoba. It broadcasts a Contemporary Christian music format and is owned by Golden West Broadcasting. CHVN's studios are located on St. Mary's Road in south Winnipeg, while its transmitter is on Red Coat Trail near 424 Road in Springstein.

== History ==
In January 2000, the CRTC approved an application by Christian Radio Manitoba Ltd. for a new specialty FM radio station in Winnipeg, focusing predominantly on Christian music. The group originally planned to broadcast on 107.1 FM, but this was denied by Industry Canada. The station instead chose to broadcast on 95.1 FM instead.

In 2004, Golden West Broadcasting acquired a controlling stake in Christian Radio Manitoba Ltd. The merger made CHVN by far Golden West's largest station by market size; most of CHVN's stablemates are located in smaller and rimshot markets in Western Canada.
