= CJBP-FM =

Radio station in Neepawa, Manitoba

Coordinates: 50.229131°N 99.465085°W

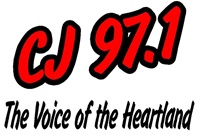
- Neepawa, Manitoba; Canada
- Broadcast area: Neepawa, Manitoba
- Frequency: 97.1 MHz
- Branding: "CJ 97.1"

Programming
- Format: Country
- Affiliations: Winnipeg Jets (NHL)

Ownership
- Owner: 5777152 Manitoba
- Sister stations: CJSB-FM CJIE-FM

History
- First air date: April 10, 2010
- Call sign meaning: C J Beautiful; Plains

Technical information
- Class: A
- ERP: 3,200 watts
- HAAT: 58 meters (190 ft)

Links
- Website: www.cj97radio.com

CJBP-FM is a Canadian radio station, that broadcasts on 97.1 MHz in Neepawa, Manitoba. The station broadcasts a country music format. Its studio location is 290 Davidson Street in Neepawa. The station is transmitting with 3,200 watts from the Manitoba Hydro Tower, located just east of Neepawa. It also provides coverage to surrounding areas including Arden, Gladstone and Minnedosa.

The station received CRTC approval on January 20, 2010. The official on-air date was April 17, 2010. It is owned by 5777152 Manitoba, a Manitoba-based broadcasting company. Its sister company, Stillwater Broadcasting, operates CJSB-FM in Swan River.
