= CJSB-FM =

Radio station in Swan River, Manitoba

Coordinates: 52°06′18″N 101°16′12″W

- Swan River, Manitoba; Canada
- Broadcast area: Swan River, Manitoba
- Frequency: 104.5 MHz
- Branding: "CJ-104"

Programming
- Format: Silent

Ownership
- Owner: Stillwater Broadcasting Limited
- Sister stations: CJBP-FM, CJIE-FM, CJVM-FM

History
- First air date: 2006
- Call sign meaning: CJ (ITU Prefix) Stillwater Broadcasting

Technical information
- Class: A
- ERP: 210 Watts
- HAAT: 22.6 meters (74 ft)

Links
- Webcast: CJ-104 Webstream
- Website: www.cj104radio.com

CJSB-FM is an adult contemporary and country formatted broadcast radio station licensed to and serving Swan River, Manitoba, Canada. CJSB-FM is currently owned and operated by Stillwater Broadcasting Limited. Its sister company, 5777152 Manitoba, operates CJBP-FM in Neepawa.

The station features local news and local information. The studio is located in the heart of downtown Swan River at 515 Main Street.

== History ==
On April 21, 2006, Stillwater Broadcasting Limited received CRTC approval to operate a new FM radio station in Swan River, Manitoba on the frequency of 104.5 MHz.

On August 19, 2010, CJSB-FM applied to add an FM transmitter in Benito, Manitoba on the frequency of 99.1 MHz to rebroadcast the programming of CJSB-FM Swan River. This application to add a new transmitter at Benito received CRTC approval on November 24, 2010.

On July 10, 2025, the station and five others with co-located master control facilities were knocked off the air by a firebombing.

== Trivia ==
The callsign CJSB was used on a former AM radio station out of Ottawa, Ontario, known today as CKQB-FM.
