= Golden West Broadcasting =

Canadian radio broadcasting company

Golden West Broadcasting Ltd.
- Type: Private
- Industry: Media
- Founded: Altona, Manitoba (1957)
- Headquarters: Altona, Manitoba
- Area served: Western Canada
- Key people: Elmer Hildebrand (CEO); Brett Adnum (President)
- Products: Media, Broadcasting
- Owner: Elmer Hildebrand
- Website: goldenwest.ca

Golden West Broadcasting Ltd. is a Canadian radio and digital media company based in Altona, Manitoba. It is the largest independent radio broadcaster in Canada. The company primarily operates small-market radio stations and internet portals in the Prairie provinces of Alberta, Saskatchewan and Manitoba.

== History ==
Golden West Broadcasting was founded as Southern Manitoba Broadcasting (SMB) on March 13, 1957 when CFAM signed on in Altona with eleven employees.

The company opened its first FM station in 1962 to serve the Winnipeg area, known as CFMW, but the station was later sold to the Canadian Broadcasting Corporation in 1965.

Despite losing money in the Winnipeg market, SMB began to expand its AM coverage in rural areas, starting with CHSM in Steinbach in 1964. The new station initially simulcast from CFAM, launching its own programming ten years later.

In 1974, the company adopted the Golden West Broadcasting name after acquiring Frontier City Broadcasting and its stations in Swift Current and Shaunavon, Saskatchewan, marking the company's first expansion outside of Manitoba, and a broader strategy of expansion into small markets in Western Canada. Golden West re-entered the FM market in 1998 with CILT-FM in Steinbach.

On January 7, 2019, Golden West announced that it would sell CHOO-FM in Drumheller, Alberta to Stingray Radio, owner of CKDQ, pending CRTC approval. In March 2022, Golden West announced the sale of CKQV in Kenora, Ontario to Acadia Broadcasting pending CRTC approval; acquired in 2010, CKQV had been Golden West's only station in Ontario. In November 2026, Golden West announced an agreement to, pending CRTC approval, trade CKMR-FM/Strathmore and CFXO-FM/High River to Pattison Media in exchange for CFDV-FM and CHUB-FM in Red Deer, and CHBW-FM in Rocky Mountain House. The two companies cited financial issues and sustainability as reasoning for the swap.

== Radio stations ==
Golden West currently owns 36 stations located in the Prairie provinces of Alberta, Saskatchewan, and Manitoba. The company focuses primarily on small and medium-sized markets that are underserved by radio due to their proximity to major markets (such as Fort Saskatchewan, a suburb of Edmonton), with a focus on local news and community information on-air and via hyperlocal web portals for each market. Two exceptions to this small-market approach are CHVN and CKCL-FM, which both serve Winnipeg.

City/Town	Call sign	Frequency	Band	Format
Airdrie, Alberta	CFIT-FM	106.1	FM	Hot adult contemporary
Altona, Manitoba	CFAM	950	AM	Easy listening
Boissevain, Manitoba	CJRB	1220	AM	Easy listening
Cochrane, Alberta	CKXY-FM	91.5	FM	Country
Estevan, Saskatchewan	CJSL	1150	AM	Classic hits
Estevan, Saskatchewan	CHSN-FM	102.3	FM	Hot adult contemporary
Estevan, Saskatchewan	CKSE-FM	106.1	FM	Country
High River/Okotoks, Alberta	CHRB	1140	AM	Christian radio
High River/Okotoks, Alberta	CFXO-FM	99.7	FM	Country
High River/Okotoks, Alberta	CKUV-FM	100.9	FM	Hot adult contemporary
Humboldt, Saskatchewan	CHBO-FM	107.5	FM	Hot adult contemporary
Kindersley, Saskatchewan	CFYM	1210	AM	Classic hits
Kindersley, Saskatchewan	CKVX-FM	104.9	FM	Country
Lacombe, Alberta	CJUV-FM	94.1	FM	Classic hits
Moose Jaw, Saskatchewan	CHAB	800	AM	Oldies
Moose Jaw, Saskatchewan	CILG-FM	100.7	FM	Country
Moose Jaw, Saskatchewan	CJAW-FM	103.9	FM	Hot adult contemporary
Portage la Prairie, Manitoba	CFRY	920	AM	Country
Portage la Prairie, Manitoba	CHPO-FM	93.1	FM	Country
Portage la Prairie, Manitoba	CJPG-FM	96.5	FM	Hot adult contemporary
Rosetown, Saskatchewan	CJYM	1330	AM	Classic hits
Shaunavon, Saskatchewan	CJSN	1490	AM	Classic hits
Steinbach, Manitoba	CHSM	1250	AM	Easy listening
Steinbach, Manitoba	CILT-FM	96.7	FM	Hot adult contemporary
Steinbach, Manitoba	CJXR-FM	107.7	FM	Country
Strathmore, Alberta	CKMR-FM	104.5	FM	Country
Swift Current, Saskatchewan	CKSW	570	AM	Classic hits
Swift Current, Saskatchewan	CIMG-FM	94.1	FM	Country
Swift Current, Saskatchewan	CKFI-FM	97.1	FM	Hot adult contemporary
Weyburn, Saskatchewan	CFSL	1190	AM	Classic hits
Weyburn, Saskatchewan	CKRC-FM	103.5	FM	Hot adult contemporary
Weyburn, Saskatchewan	CHWY-FM	106.7	FM	Country
Winkler/Morden, Manitoba	CKMW-FM	88.9	FM	Country
Winkler/Morden, Manitoba	CJEL-FM	93.5	FM	Hot adult contemporary
Winnipeg, Manitoba	CHVN-FM	95.1	FM	Contemporary christian music
Winnipeg, Manitoba	CKCL-FM	107.1	FM	Classical music

== Other operations ==
On October 28, 2004, Canadian Satellite Radio announced a partnership with both Golden West Broadcasting and Rawlco Communications that would give the two broadcasting companies the option to acquire an ownership interest in CSR should its satellite radio application be approved by the CRTC.

In a press release for the announcement, Elmer Hildebrand, CEO of Golden West Broadcasting, stated:

"Satellite radio has the potential to deliver enormous positive impact to Canadians at all levels of this industry - musicians, artists, and listeners alike. I am happy to participate in this application which I believe will have a positive impact on commercial radio, and given this technological development, it is important to license and regulate it in Canada expeditiously."

CSR's application and two others were approved on June 16, 2005; CSR's service, XM Radio Canada, launched on December 1, 2005.

Hildebrand owns two radio stations in the city of Saskatoon through Saskatoon Media Group—which are separate from Golden West.

In February 2021, the company acquired the Steinbach-based Summit Organizational Development.
