= CJNU-FM =

Radio station in Winnipeg, Canada

- Winnipeg, Manitoba; Canada
- Broadcast area: Winnipeg Metropolitan Region
- Frequency: 93.7 MHz
- Branding: 93.7 CJNU

Programming
- Language: English
- Format: Adult standards
- Affiliations: Winnipeg Goldeyes

Ownership
- Owner: Nostalgia Broadcasting Cooperative

History
- First air date: December 2, 2006
- Former frequencies: 104.7 MHz (2006–2008); 107.9 MHz (2008–2013)

Technical information
- Licensing authority: CRTC
- Class: A
- ERP: 2,000 watts
- HAAT: 110.5 metres (363 ft)
- Transmitter coordinates: 49°52′52.3″N 97°8′58.7″W

Links
- Webcast: Listen live
- Website: cjnu.ca

CJNU-FM (93.7 FM) is a Canadian radio station in Winnipeg, Manitoba, Canada. Owned by the not-for-profit Nostalgia Broadcasting Cooperative, the station plays an adult standards format. CJNU's offices and studios are in One Lombard Place. The transmitter is located at 55 Nassau Street in Osborne Village.

== History ==
The station signed on the air on December 2, 2006 on 104.7 FM, originally on a special events permit issued by Industry Canada. As a way to comply with the special events license, CJNU operated as a means of spreading awareness for various non-profit organizations and charities in the Winnipeg area.

Each month, the station broadcast in support of a different organization, remaining on the air for up to 28 days at a time. Businesses or companies also sponsored portions of the broadcast day to assist the station in its mission to keep nostalgia music on the air. Members of the public would also purchase a membership, entitling them to a vote at member meetings. The broadcast schedule included a number of veteran Winnipeg air personalities, broadcasting students, and other volunteers.

In 2008, the station relocated to 107.9 FM, following the revocation of CJWV-FM's license on that frequency.

In February 2013, the CRTC granted a new license for Nostalgia Broadcasting to operate on 93.7 MHz. The new license enabled the station to broadcast at 460 watts ERP and, as it is a standard community radio license, is no longer obligated to go off air once a month.

Installation of new equipment and testing on 93.7 began in early August 2013, with the station officially relocating on September 4, 2013. While its air time is no longer restricted, CJNU continues to sponsor a charity on a monthly basis as before.

In 2016, CJNU became the new radio home of the Winnipeg Goldeyes of the American Association of Independent Professional Baseball under an initial 3-year deal, replacing CFJL-FM. On September 3, 2016, the team's PR assistant Danielle Doiron called the third inning of a game on CJNU, becoming the first woman to call a baseball game for a Canadian professional team.
