= CILT-FM =

Radio station in Manitoba

Coordinates: 49°30′17″N 96°58′59″W

- Steinbach, Manitoba; Canada
- Broadcast area: Southeastern Manitoba (including Winnipeg)
- Frequency: 96.7 MHz (FM)
- Branding: Mix 96.7

Programming
- Format: Hot adult contemporary
- Affiliations: Steinbach Pistons

Ownership
- Owner: Golden West Broadcasting
- Sister stations: CHSM, CJXR-FM

History
- First air date: September 24, 1998
- Call sign meaning: "Lite" (former branding)

Technical information
- Class: C1
- ERP: 50,000 watts (average); 100,000 watts (peak)
- HAAT: 56 metres (184 ft)

Links
- Webcast: https://goldenweststreaming.com/cilt/console/

CILT-FM (96.7 FM, "Mix 96"), is a radio station broadcasting a hot adult contemporary/classic hits format, similar to CKNO-FM in Edmonton. Licensed to Steinbach, Manitoba, it serves southeastern Manitoba, even to Winnipeg. It first began broadcasting in 1998 with an adult contemporary format as Lite 96.7. The station is currently owned by Golden West Broadcasting. By 2006, the station changed formats to hot adult contemporary under the branding Mix 96.7.
