= NCI FM =

First Nations radio network in Manitoba, Canada

CICY-FM
- Selkirk, Manitoba; Canada
- Broadcast area: Winnipeg Metropolitan Region
- Frequency: 105.5 MHz
- Branding: NCI FM

Programming
- Format: Country; First Nations community radio

Ownership
- Owner: Native Communications Inc.
- Sister stations: CIUR-FM

History
- First air date: 1998

Technical information
- Class: C1
- ERP: 100,000 watts
- HAAT: 143 metres (469 ft)
- Translator: See below

Links
- Webcast: Listen live
- Website: ncifm.com

NCI FM is a First Nations radio network in Manitoba. Owned by Native Communications Inc. (NCI), it broadcasts programming targeting First Nations communities in Manitoba, including mainstream country music, and specialty programs featuring Indigenous music.

The network is headquartered at 1507 Inkster Blvd in Winnipeg, where it is heard locally on the Selkirk-licensed transmitter 105.5 CICY-FM. NCI operates 57 transmitters and rebroadcasters across the province. NCI also operates a second station in Winnipeg—CIUR-FM—which carries a rhythmic adult contemporary format.

== History ==
NCI was first established in 1971 as a radio broadcaster targeting First Nations communities in Northern Manitoba, founded by Donald A. McIvor (1925-2006)—a former mayor of Wabowden, Manitoba, and member of the Northern Association of Community Councils. Initially, NCI served as a producer of programming, which it aired as time-buys on local stations.

In the 1990s, NCI began to build out a radio network of its own, receiving licenses for transmitters serving various Manitoba communities. In 1994, NCI received approval from the CRTC for a First Nations radio station in Thompson, Manitoba on 96.3 FM; CINC-FM would serve as the initial originating station for the NCI network, carrying at least 126 hours of programming per-week in the English, Cree, Dene, Oji-Cree, and Saulteaux languages. At least 54 hours of programming per-week would be networked programming, produced by NCI from Thompson, and supplied from CFWE in Lac La Biche, Alberta. In 1997, NCI was granted a license for a transmitter on 105.5 FM in Selkirk, Manitoba, which would serve Winnipeg.

The NCI network officially launched in 1998. In 2000, the Selkirk transmitter became the separately-licensed station CICY-FM, and the NCI network phased out CFWE programming in favour of programs originating from CICY's studios in Winnipeg.

In June 2008, the CRTC approved an application by NCI for a second station in Winnipeg, CIUR-FM, which would initially launch in 2009 as Streetz 104.7—a separate urban contemporary station carrying music targeting Aboriginal youth. As of April 2026, the station operates as rhythmic adult contemporary Ziibi 104.7.

== Transmitters ==
Call sign	Frequency	City of License
VF2196	96.9 FM	Berens River
VF2339	96.9 FM	Bloodvein
CIWM-FM	107.5 FM	Brandon/Dauphin
VF2220	96.9 FM	Brochet
VF2420	93.9 FM	Camperville
VF2312	96.9 FM	Churchill
VF2261	96.9 FM	Cormorant
CICP-FM	96.9 FM	Cranberry Portage
VF2195	93.5 FM	Cross Lake
CIDM-FM	97.3 FM	Dauphin
VF2421	93.5 FM	Dauphin River
VF2262	96.9 FM	Duck Bay
VF2337	93.5 FM	Easterville
CIFR-FM	96.9 FM	Fairford/Lake St. Martin
CIFF-FM	101.1 FM	Flin Flon
VF2334	93.5 FM	Fox Lake
VF2198	96.9 FM	Garden Hill
VF2333	101.1 FM	Gillam
VF2174	93.5 FM	Gods Lake Narrows
VF2175	93.9 FM	Gods River
VF2263	96.9 FM	Grand Rapids
VF2336	93.5 FM	Griswold
VF2340	93.5 FM	Hollow Water/Manigotagan
VF2422	93.9 FM	Ilford/War Lake
VF2404	93.5 FM	Jackhead
VF2106	96.9 FM	Lac Brochet
VF2335	93.5 FM	Lake Manitoba
VF2406	93.5 FM	Leaf Rapids
VF2407	96.9 FM	Little Grand Rapids
VF2382	101.7 FM	Long Plain
VF2423	96.9 FM	Lynn Lake
VF2313	96.9 FM	Moose Lake
VF2222	96.9 FM	Nelson House
CINR-FM	92.9 FM	Norway House
VF2314	96.9 FM	Oxford House
VF2504	93.3 FM	Paint Lake
VF2405	93.5 FM	Pauingassi
CIPM-FM	100.9 FM	Peguis
CKQX-FM	96.9 FM	Pelican Rapids
VF2264	96.9 FM	Pikwitonei
VF2167	96.9 FM	Pukatawagan
VF2108	96.9 FM	Red Sucker Lake
CIST-FM	93.5 FM	St. Theresa Point
CICY-FM	105.5 FM	Selkirk (Winnipeg)
VF2199	96.9 FM	Shamattawa
VF2342	93.5 FM	Sherridon
VF2462	96.3 FM	Snow Lake
CISI-FM	96.9 FM	South Indian Lake
VF2265	96.9 FM	Split Lake
CISF-FM	90.5 FM	Swan Lake
CISV-FM	93.3 FM	Swan River
VF2109	96.9 FM	Tadoule Lake
CITP-FM	92.7 FM	The Pas
VF2338	96.9 FM	Thicket Portage
CINC-FM	96.3 FM	Thompson
VF2168	96.9 FM	Wabowden
CIWR-FM	93.5 FM	Waterhen
CHYL-FM	93.5 FM	York Landing

== Programming and events ==
Some of NCI FM's regular weekly programming includes:

- The Métis Hour x2, a two-hour Saturday morning program presented by the Manitoba Métis Federation (MMF). It features a mix of classic country and Métis music, and news and information oriented towards Manitoba's Métis community (including regular appearances by MMF president David Chartrand). From its premiere in 1998 through 2022, the program was co-hosted by musician Ray St. Germain and Naomi Clarke; St. Germain retired from the program in 2022.
- The Indigenous Music Countdown, a weekly chart show devoted to music by Indigenous performers; the program has been syndicated to other First Nations radio stations in Canada and the United States, and is also carried by SiriusXM Canada's The Indigiverse.
- Friends on Fridays, a weekly all-request call-in show aired on Friday evenings, hosted by Jordan Knight and Davey Gott; the show has been described as being an institution among Manitoba's First Nations communities, with Gott stating it that it receives enough calls that getting on the air was akin to winning a lottery.

The network broadcasts Radio Bingo on Saturday mornings.

NCI hosts an annual concert event known as the "NCI Jam", which features a talent show highlighting amateur Indigenous musicians, as well as special guest performances and award presentations.
