= CJRB =

Radio station in Boissevain, Manitoba

Coordinates: 49°15′26″N 100°03′26″W

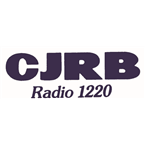
- Boissevain, Manitoba; Canada
- Broadcast area: Westman Region
- Frequency: 1220 kHz
- Branding: CJRB Radio 1220

Programming
- Language: English
- Format: Commercial/Easy listening/Oldies

Ownership
- Owner: Golden West Broadcasting

History
- First air date: October 1973

Technical information
- Class: B
- Power: 10,000 watts

Links
- Webcast: Listen Live
- Website: discoverwestman.com/cjrb

CJRB is a Canadian radio station broadcasting an easy listening/oldies format at 1220 AM. Licensed to Boissevain, Manitoba, it serves the Westman Region. It first began broadcasting in October 1973. The station is currently owned by Golden West Broadcasting.

CJRB is the only station in Canada which broadcasts on 1220 kHz; 1220 AM is a Mexican clear-channel frequency. CJRB is a Class B station.
