= CHSM =

Coordinates: 49°30′15″N 96°58′55″W

- Steinbach, Manitoba; Canada
- Frequency: 1250 kHz (AM)
- Branding: AM 1250 Radio

Programming
- Format: Easy listening

Ownership
- Owner: Golden West Broadcasting

History
- First air date: April 16, 1964
- Call sign meaning: "Steinbach, Manitoba"

Technical information
- Class: B
- Power: 10,000 watts

Links
- Website: am1250online.com

CHSM (1250 AM) is a radio station in Steinbach, Manitoba. Owned by Golden West Broadcasting, it broadcasts a full-service easy listening format serving southeastern Manitoba.

== History ==
The station was established in April 1964 by Southern Manitoba Broadcasting Co., a forerunner to the current Golden West Broadcasting; the station was initially licensed as a repeater of its initial station CFAM in Altona. In 1974, the station was given permission to begin originating its own programming
