= Elmer Hildebrand =

Canadian businessman and broadcaster (born 1935)

- Born: 1935 (age 90–91); Altona, Manitoba, Canada
- Occupation: Businessman
- Known for: Chairman & CEO Golden West Broadcasting
- Spouse: Hilda Hildebrand

Elmer Hildebrand CM OM (born 1935) is a Canadian businessman, investor, philanthropist, and broadcaster from Altona, Manitoba, who currently serves as the owner, CEO, and president of Golden West Broadcasting.

Hildebrand joined Golden West in 1961, just four years after its inception, and served as president for many decades, growing the company to more than forty radio stations, and the largest independent radio broadcaster in Canada. He is a former director of the Canadian Association of Broadcasters and was inducted into the CAB Hall of Fame, Manitoba Business Hall of Fame, and Manitoba Hockey Hall of Fame. He also served as President of the Mennonite Heritage Village in Steinbach, Manitoba.

He was awarded the Order of Manitoba in 2007 and made a member of the Order of Canada in 2013.

He lives in Winnipeg with his wife Hilda and also owns a historic Mennonite housebarn in Neubergthal, Manitoba, a National Historic Site of Canada.
