= Media in Medicine Hat =

This is a list of media in Medicine Hat, Alberta.

== Radio ==
Frequency	Call sign	Branding	Format	Owner	Language/rebroadcast
FM 93.7	CJLT-FM	UCB	Contemporary Christian music	United Christian Broadcasters Canada	English
FM 94.5	CHAT-FM	Wild 94.5	country music	Jim Pattison Group	English
FM 96.1	CFMY-FM	My 96	hot adult contemporary	Jim Pattison Group	English
FM 97.3	CKUA-FM-3	CKUA Radio Network	public broadcasting	CKUA Radio Foundation	English, rebroadcasts CKUA-FM Edmonton
FM 98.3	CBRM-FM	CBC Radio One	news/talk	Canadian Broadcasting Corporation	English, rebroadcasts CBR Calgary
FM 100.5	CHFA-FM-8	Ici Radio-Canada Première	news/talk	Canadian Broadcasting Corporation	French; rebroadcasts CHFA Edmonton
FM 102.1	CJCY-FM	Jack 102.1	adult hits	Rogers Media	English
FM 105.3	CKMH-FM	Rock 105.3	active rock	Rogers Media	English

== Television ==
OTA channel	DTV channel	Cable channel	Call sign	Network	Notes	Rebroadcast
6		3	CHAT-TV	Citytv	Formerly an affiliate of CBC Television & E! Canada. Ceased operations June 3, 2025.	
8		9	CFCN-TV-8	CTV	OTA broadcasting ended by the shutdown of CHAT-TV, noted above.	Analogue repeater of CFCN-DT Calgary
		10		Shaw TV Medicine Hat	Community Access Television	

Prior to 2025, Medicine Hat was served by one over-the-air English-language station, CHAT-TV, channel 6, carrying programming from Rogers Sports & Media's Citytv network and before, Canwest's E! service. The station was closed on June 3, 2025, due to financial troubles.

All of the city's other television services are rebroadcasters of stations from Calgary as Medicine Hat is not designated as a mandatory market for digital television conversion. All broadcasting stations broadcast only in analogue.

After CHAT-TV disaffiliated from CBC Television service in 2008, Calgary's CBRT then set up a retransmitter in form of CBCA-TV-1 12 in Etzikom. That transmitter was shuttered with other CBC rebroadcasters in 2012. Alberta's Radio-Canada station, CBXFT-DT Edmonton, is also available on cable.

There are two "cable" television providers in Medicine Hat, Shaw Communications and Telus. Shaw carries American network affiliates from Spokane, Washington.

== Print ==
- Medicine Hat News
- Prairie Post
