= CJNS-FM =

Radio station in Meadow Lake, Saskatchewan

Coordinates: 53°53′08″N 108°24′35″W

- Meadow Lake, Saskatchewan; Canada
- Frequency: 102.3 MHz
- Branding: 102.3 CJNS

Programming
- Format: Country

Ownership
- Owner: Jim Pattison Group
- Sister stations: CJNB, CJCQ-FM, CJHD-FM

History
- First air date: 1977
- Former frequencies: 1240 kHz (1977–2004)
- Call sign meaning: Northern Saskatchewan

Technical information
- Class: B
- ERP: 30 kW vertical polarization 45 kW horizontal polarization
- HAAT: 157.6 metres (517 ft)

Links
- Webcast: Listen Live
- Website: meadowlakenow.com

CJNS-FM is a Canadian radio station that broadcasts a country format at 102.3 FM in Meadow Lake, Saskatchewan. CJNS is owned by the Jim Pattison Group.

The station provides some 30 hours of local programming a week, 6 hours per day, Monday to Friday. The remainder of the programming continues to originate from, and is basically a satellite of, CJNB in North Battleford. Its radio studio is at 225 Centre Street in Meadow Lake.

CJNS originally began broadcasting in 1977 as an AM radio station at 1240 on the AM dial, until it moved to FM in 2004.
