= CJCY =

CJCY may refer to:

- CJCY-FM, a radio station (102.1 FM) licensed to Medicine Hat, Alberta, Canada
- CFMY-FM, a radio station (96.1 FM) licensed to Medicine Hat, Alberta, Canada, which held the call sign CJCY from 1982 to 1998
