= Brocket 99 =

Canadian comedy tape

- Genre: Parody
- Running time: 112 minutes
- Country of origin: Canada
- Language: English
- Home station: CHEC
- Syndicates: None
- TV adaptations: None
- Hosted by: Tim Hitchner, others unknown
- Starring: Tim Hitchner
- Announcer: Tim Hitchner, others unknown
- Created by: Tim Hitchner, others unknown
- Written by: Tim Hitchner, others unknown
- Directed by: Tim Hitchner, others unknown
- Produced by: Tim Hitchner, others unknown
- Executive producer: Tim Hitchner
- Edited by: Tim Hitchner, others unknown
- Senior editor: Tim Hitchner,
- Narrated by: Tim Hitchner, others unknown
- Recording studio: 1090 CHEC, Lethbridge & 1570 CKTA, Taber
- Original release: September 1986 – 1989
- No. of series: 1
- No. of episodes: 2
- Audio format: Reel to Reel(Side A) and Cassette Tape(Side B), transferred to Compact Disc
- Website: http://www.brocket99.net/

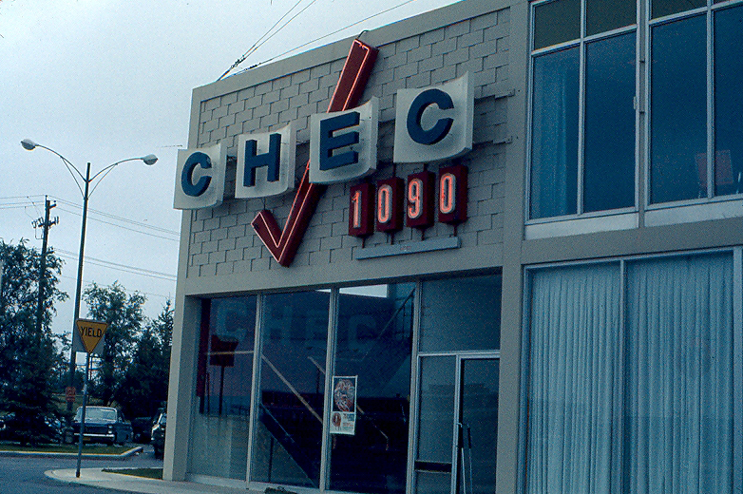
The 1090 CHEC Radio Station where Brocket 99 was recorded.

Tim Hitchner in July 2006

Brocket 99 was a comedy audio tape that parodied aboriginal people in Canada. It has been described as a "phenomenon" by some, and racist by others.

== 1986 tape ==
The premise of the Brocket 99 tape was that of a fictitious radio station broadcasting from Brocket, Alberta, on the Southern Peigan reserve (a real First Nations reservation 70 km west of Lethbridge, Alberta), hosted by a character named "Ernie Scar" and featuring other participants.

The tape stereotypes Canadian First Nations peoples as habitual users of alcohol, drugs and welfare, engaging in anti-social behavior, and low in intelligence. The content of the tape is a mixture of music, advertisements, news, sports, interviews and local announcements divided into two parts corresponding to the two sides of a cassette tape in common use at the time. Music played on the tape included complete versions from AC/DC, Hank Williams Jr., The Romantics, Paul Revere & the Raiders, John Anderson, Doctor and the Medics and Dwight Yoakam, although AC/DC is the most used artist. Advertisements on the tape were either original creations interspersed with vulgarity, racism, and stereotypical language for real products, such as for Lysol, or taken from legitimately produced radio commercials for companies such as Safeway, Penner's Men's and Women's Wear in Taber, Alberta and Beaver Lumber. News, sports, interviews, and local announcements on the tape are largely original creations interspersed with factual entities, such as the Seattle Seahawks and Toronto Blue Jays, as well as non-existent entities, such as "Brocket Used Motors" and "Brocket Alcohol & Drug Abuse Hotline" created specifically for the tape. It is unconfirmed though realistically impossible that any of the music or produced or original advertising content for any of the businesses referred to in the tape would have authorized their use during the production of the tape, owing to its stereotypical and racist content.

The tape was created in 1986 by Tim Hitchner, a radio DJ in Lethbridge, Alberta, as a parody and not intended to be marketed. Hitchner worked as a radio DJ at CHEC, CKTA, and CKIZ-FM from 1985 to 1992. It is claimed that Hitchner was inspired to create Brocket 99 based on another underground tape circulating in 1986 called "AIDS Radio" that was a spoof of a homosexual radio station using stereotypical and bigoted references. The initial method of distribution from Tim Hitchner has not been documented, although its wider distribution has been described as viral. The tape has been described as an "international underground phenomenon".

Hitchner died on February 12, 2011. On February 12, 2011, a fan site reported the then anonymous actor who played Ernie Scar had died at age 49, of myocardial infarction due to coronary artery disease. CKIZ's list of past employees on its website currently identifies Hitchner as the voice of Ernie Scar.

== Documentary film ==
In 2005, Nilesh Patel produced and directed a documentary, Brocket 99: Rockin' the Country, which examined the ongoing popularity of the tape and the relationship between aboriginal people and others in Canada.

A caricature imitation of the programming of an Amerindian community radio has made all of Canada bogus. It is no longer humor, it is rage. / A gross parody of an Amerindian community radio program brought belly -laughs throughout Canada. It isn't a joke any more, but a kick in the teeth.

— Nilesh C. Patel

The film won the Séquences Magazine Prize for best documentary film at the 2006 Montreal First Peoples Festival.

In 2004, prior to the release of the documentary, Mark Campbell of Global News interviewed Patel. In addition to discussing prevailing Canadian attitudes on race and culture in the context of the documentary, Patel made an unsubstantiated claim during the interview that Campbell was in denial about being the creator of Brocket 99. No evidence has been presented implicating any individual other than Tim Hitchner in creating or participating the tape. On February 15, 2015, Campbell wrote a blog post confirming again that he was not involved.

== See also ==
- Ethnic joke
