= CFJC-TV =

Television station in Kamloops

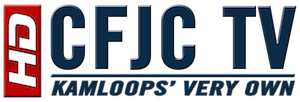
- Kamloops, British Columbia; Canada
- Channels: Analog: 4 (VHF); Digital: allocated 13 (VHF)
- Branding: CFJC TV

Programming
- Affiliations: Citytv

Ownership
- Owner: Jim Pattison Group; (Jim Pattison Broadcast Group Limited Partnership)

History
- First air date: April 8, 1957
- Former call signs: CFCR-TV (1957–1971)
- Former affiliations: CBC (1957–2006); CH / E! (2006–2009)

Technical information
- Licensing authority: CRTC
- ERP: 3.7 kW
- HAAT: 152.7 m (501 ft)
- Transmitter coordinates: 50°40′9″N 120°23′52″W
- Translator(s): see § Transmitters

Links
- Website: CFJC Today

CFJC-TV (analog channel 4, cable channel 7) is a television station in Kamloops, British Columbia, Canada, affiliated with Citytv. Owned by the Jim Pattison Broadcast Group, the station has studios on Pemberton Terrace and Columbia Street West in Kamloops, and its transmitter is located near Southern Yellowhead Highway/Highway 5, southeast of Kamloops Airport.

== History ==
CFJC-TV logo until 2007, with station slogan "Your Very Own".

The station first signed on the air on April 8, 1957, as CFCR-TV, originally operating as a CBC affiliate; the station changed its call letters to CFJC-TV (taken from local radio station CFJC, its owner at the time) on September 1, 1971. The television and radio stations were purchased by the Jim Pattison Group in 1987.

By the 1990s, CFJC had delegated its national advertising sales to Western International Communications, owner of fellow CBC affiliate CHBC in Kelowna. WIC began selling the two stations' advertising as a single unit under the name "BCI TV". For years, both stations carried virtually identical programming schedules apart from local newscasts, with the majority of non-CBC programming coming from Global and, to a lesser extent, WIC itself (Global was not available as a standalone network in the B.C. interior until Vancouver station CHAN-TV became an affiliate in 2001). Canwest acquired CHBC in 2000 and assumed the same role in selling advertising and providing programming, primarily from its CH television system. During the 1990s and early 2000s, the station branded itself as "CFJC TV7", in reference to its cable channel position in the Kamloops area.

On November 1, 2005, the Canadian Radio-television and Telecommunications Commission (CRTC) announced it had received an application from Pattison to disaffiliate CFJC from CBC Television. According to documents filed with the commission, the continuation of CFJC's joint sales agreement with CHBC—which had previously received clearance to disaffiliate and become a CH station under Canwest—was contingent on CFJC's concurrent disaffiliation. The CRTC gave its approval on February 1, 2006, and CFJC disaffiliated from the CBC on February 27, 2006, and was rebranded itself as "The All-New Independent TV7" after its disaffiliation. As CHAN is already broadcast in Kamloops, Canwest continued to supply the bulk of the station's programming, and CFJC became, in effect, the first CH station that was not owned by Canwest.

In September 2007, CH was rebranded as "E!", complete with several E!-branded programs, making it difficult for CFJC to continue to call itself "independent". By October, the station had embraced the new E! identity in its general branding outside of local programming, and rebranded its newscasts from CFJC TV7 News to simply CFJC News, in line with the Canwest-owned E! stations elsewhere in the country.

The 2006 affiliation switch had left CBC Television solely dependent on cable and satellite carriage of its Vancouver station CBUT in the market, with no new terrestrial transmitters being installed in the Kamloops area. The Canadian Broadcasting Corporation indicated it had not budgeted for this scenario and therefore could not afford to replace the transmitters, as it has done in most cases in years past when private affiliates left the network.

The CBC later announced that the transmitters of Jim Pattison's two other former CBC affiliates that switched to E!, CKPG-TV in Prince George and CHAT-TV in Medicine Hat, would not be replaced, and no transmitters were scheduled to be installed for the future in these areas. All three areas ended up being served by other television networks. However, despite a limited Francophone population in the absence of an Anglophone network, Radio-Canada station CBUFT out of Vancouver was available over-the-air in Kamloops and Prince George, and CBUFT sister station CBXFT out of Edmonton was available in Medicine Hat until CBC shut down its rebroadcast transmitters in 2012.

CFJC logo used from 2007 to 2012; this served as the basis of the current logo.

On July 14, 2009, Pattison announced that CFJC and its other E! affiliates would begin receiving programming from Rogers Media's Citytv system starting September 1; CFJC and CKPG would also become part of a new regional sales initiative known as "inTV". Canwest had previously announced it would sell or close its E! stations, leaving the Pattison stations without a programming source. On May 3, 2012, Rogers announced that it renewed the Citytv affiliation agreements with the Jim Pattison Group, which were originally slated to expire that August; under the agreement, CKPG largely became a semi-satellite of CKVU-DT, broadcasting the majority of its programming in pattern with the Vancouver O&O (including Breakfast Television), but opting out for locally produced midday and evening newscasts.

== News operation ==
CFJC-TV News logo

CFJC-TV broadcasts 10 hours of locally produced newscasts each week (two hours each weekday); there are no newscasts on Saturdays or Sundays. On May 18, 2012, CFJC-TV began broadcasting its local newscasts in high definition.

== Transmitters ==
CFJC-TV has three rebroadcast transmitters serving outlying communities in the mountainous region.

Station	City of licence	Channel	ERP	HAAT	Transmitter coordinates
CFJC-TV-5	Williams Lake	8 (VHF)	0.009 kW	125 m (410 ft)	52°6′55″N 122°11′15″W
CFJC-TV-6	100 Mile House	5 (VHF)	0.98 kW	570.3 m (1,871 ft)	51°54′0″N 121°15′35″W
CFJC-TV-7	Quesnel	7 (VHF)	0.009 kW	393 m (1,289 ft)	52°53′0″N 122°20′10″W

Transmitters at Chase, Clinton, Merritt, Nicola and Pritchard have been decommissioned.

=== Digital television and high definition ===
According to a 2009 CRTC decision, CFJC-TV is not required to activate its digital signal, as Kamloops was not a mandatory market for digital conversion, which took place in most other markets on August 31, 2011. When CFJC signs on its digital signal, the station will broadcast on VHF channel 13, using virtual channel 4.
