= B93 =

B93 may refer to:

- Sicilian Defence, Najdorf Variation, Encyclopaedia of Chess Openings code
- B93, a postcode district in the B postcode area
- Bundesstraße 93, a German road
- Gurktal Straße, an Austrian road
- The on-air brand name of numerous radio stations, including:
  - CFOB-FM, Fort Frances, Ontario
  - CJBZ-FM, Lethbridge, Alberta
  - KBRK-FM, Brookings, South Dakota
  - KBTS-FM, Austin, Texas (former incarnation)
  - KOSO, Modesto, California
  - KZBT, Midland, Texas
  - WBCT-FM, Grand Rapids, Michigan
  - WBFM, Sheboygan, Wisconsin
  - WCYE, Rhinelander, Wisconsin
  - WFBC-FM, Greenville, South Carolina
  - WYAB, Jackson, Mississippi (on 103.9 FM since August 28, 2008; former incarnation as it later rebranded as 103-9 WYAB)

B.93 may refer to:

- Boldklubben af 1893, Danish football club
- Boldklubben af 1893 (women), Danish women's football team
