= British Columbia (disambiguation) =

British Columbia is a province of Canada which has given its name to many associated places and institutions:

== Rail ==
- British Columbia Electric Railway
- 45559 British Columbia, a British LMS Jubilee Class locomotive

== Sports ==
- British Columbia Derby
- British Columbia Hockey League
- British Columbia Intercollegiate Hockey League
- British Columbia Lacrosse Association
- British Columbia Lions, a Canadian Football League team
- British Columbia Mountaineering Club
- British Columbia Rugby Union

== Other uses ==
- British Columbia Magazine
- Order of British Columbia, the Canadian province's highest honour
- British Columbia (wine)
- British Columbia: An Untold History, a Canadian documentary series
- "British Columbia", a song by The Elected from Me First, 2004
- "British Columbia", a 1972 episode of the documentary series Untamed World

== See also ==
- British Columbia Institute of Technology
- British Columbia Wildlife Park, a zoo
- University of British Columbia, Vancouver, British Columbia, Canada
- Bank of British Columbia, the name of two banks, both defunct
- British Columbia Dragoons, a regiment of the Canadian Army
