= Brocket 99: Rockin' the Country =

2006 film by Nilesh Patel

Brocket 99: Rockin’ the Country
- Directed by: Nilesh Patel
- Written by: Nilesh Patel
- Produced by: Nilesh Patel
- Cinematography: Jason W. Clarke
- Edited by: Art Maughan
- Music by: Chris Guy, Patrick Stewart
- Release date: June 2006
- Running time: 98 minutes
- Country: Canada
- Language: English

Brocket 99: Rockin' the Country is a Canadian documentary film directed by Nilesh Patel, which examined the ongoing popularity of Brocket 99, a controversial radio comedy tape based on stereotypes of Canadian First Nations people.

CBC Radio's Sounds Like Canada described Brocket 99 as:

It started as a fake radio show on a cassette. Then it developed a cult following. Brocket 99 is something of a cultural phenomenon in western Canada. It purports to be a radio program on an Indian reserve. Some people find it hilarious and racey. Others say it's outright racist.

In 2006, the film won the Séquences Magazine Prize in the documentary category at the Montreal First Peoples' Festival and the Special Recognition Award at the Anchorage International Film Festival. The film was also featured at the 2006 Calgary and Edmonton International Film Festivals and the Vancouver Asian Film Festival.
