= CKWD-FM =

Radio station in Calgary

Coordinates: 51°03′37″N 114°10′17″W

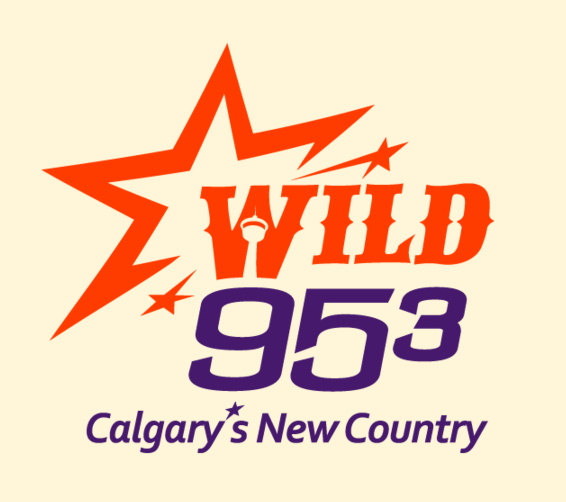
- Calgary, Alberta; Canada
- Broadcast area: Calgary Metropolitan Region
- Frequency: 95.3 MHz
- Branding: Wild 95.3

Programming
- Format: Country

Ownership
- Owner: Jim Pattison Group; (Jim Pattison Broadcast Group Ltd.)
- Sister stations: CKCE-FM

History
- First air date: April 25, 2014
- Former call signs: CHPK-FM (2014–2016)
- Call sign meaning: "Wild" (branding)

Technical information
- Class: C1
- ERP: 29,000 watts average 100,000 watts peak
- HAAT: 272 metres (892 ft)

Links
- Webcast: Listen Live
- Website: wild953.com

CKWD-FM is a Canadian radio station broadcasting at 95.3 FM in Calgary, Alberta, Canada owned by Jim Pattison Group. The station broadcasts a country format branded as Wild 95.3. CKWD's studios are located on 58th Avenue Southwest in Calgary, while its transmitter is located on Old Banff Coach Road. The station is owned and operated by Jim Pattison Group who also owns sister station CKCE-FM.

As of Winter 2020, CKWD is the 15th-most-listened-to radio station in the Calgary market according to a PPM data report released by Numeris.

== History ==
CKWD-FM's license was granted by the Canadian Radio-television and Telecommunications Commission on May 24, 2012. On May 16, 2013, the Jim Pattison Group acquired CKCE-FM from Bell Media, as part of divestments from its purchase of Astral Media; CKCE would move to the studio being built for the new station. The station officially launched as CHPK-FM on April 25, 2014 with an adult album alternative format as 95.3 The Peak.

On February 29, 2016, CHPK flipped to country branded as Wild 95.3; the station's general manager Eric Stafford cited low interest and ratings for the station's AAA format as an impetus for the switch. He believed that The Peak was unable to fully distinguish itself from its main competitor, CFEX-FM, in order to remain competitive. The new Wild format would compete mainly against the dominant CKRY-FM; Stafford stated that Wild would target a younger audience, and have a focus on newer material and fewer "throwback" songs.

In October 2022, Pattison began to extend the Wild brand to some of its other country stations, including Alberta's CHAT-FM and CHLB-FM, as well as CHBZ-FM in Cranbrook, British Columbia.
