= CHLB-FM =

Radio station in Lethbridge

- Lethbridge, Alberta; Canada
- Broadcast area: Lethbridge County
- Frequency: 95.5 MHz
- Branding: Wild 95.5

Programming
- Format: Country

Ownership
- Owner: Jim Pattison Group
- Sister stations: CJBZ-FM

History
- First air date: August 28, 1959
- Former call signs: CHEC (1959–1993); CKRX (1993–1996); CKRX-FM (1996–1997)
- Former frequencies: 1090 kHz (1959–1996)
- Call sign meaning: LB for Lethbridge

Technical information
- Licensing authority: CRTC
- Class: C1
- ERP: 100 kW
- HAAT: 173 metres (568 ft)
- Transmitter coordinates: 49.694°N 112.810565°W

Links
- Website: wild955.ca

CHLB-FM (95.5 MHz) is a radio station in Lethbridge, Alberta, Canada. Owned by the Jim Pattison Group, the station broadcasts a country format.

== History ==
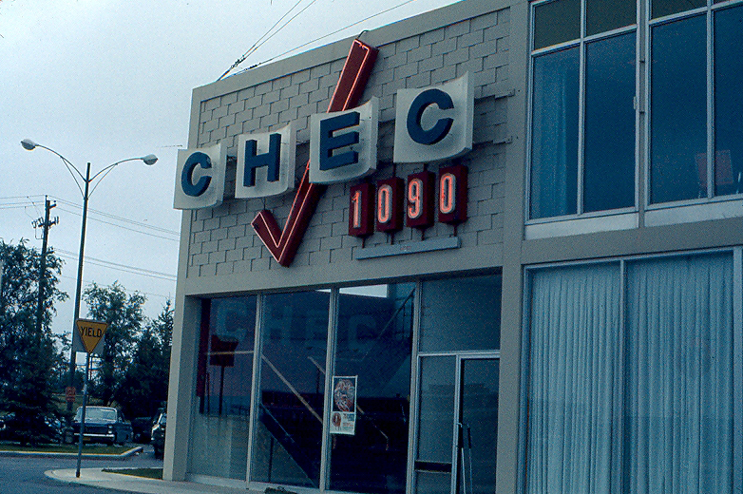
Station's studios during its 1090 CHEC era.

The station originally began broadcasting in 1959 as CHEC at 1090 AM. It was owned by Southern Alberta Broadcasting, which later became a subsidiary of Shaw Communications. Notable radio personalities during this period included Bryan Fustukian, broadcasting as Vik Armen.

From 1985 to 1992, Tim Hitchner worked as a radio DJ at the station. In 1986, Hitchner and other employees at CHEC created and recorded Brocket 99, a controversial comedy tape, at the station's studios.

The station was acquired by Monarch Broadcasting in 1993. It changed its call sign to CKRX later that same year, adopting new branding as 1090 Rocks. The station moved to its current frequency 95.5 FM in 1996, and adopted its current call sign and format in 1997.

Monarch Broadcasting was acquired by Pattison in 2000.

In October 2022, the station rebranded as Wild 95.5, taking its name from Calgary sister station CKWD-FM.
