= CHAT-TV =

Television station in Medicine Hat (1957–2025)

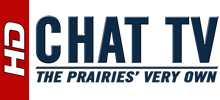
- Medicine Hat, Alberta; Canada
- Channels: Analog: 6 (VHF); Digital: allocated 36 (UHF), never built
- Branding: CHAT TV

Programming
- Affiliations: CBC (1957–2008); E! (2008–2009); Citytv (2009–2025)

Ownership
- Owner: Jim Pattison Group; (Jim Pattison Broadcast Group Limited Partnership)

History
- First air date: September 14, 1957
- Last air date: June 3, 2025; (67 years, 262 days)
- Call sign meaning: Medicine Hat (taken from its sister radio station)

Technical information
- Licensing authority: CRTC
- ERP: 58 kW
- HAAT: 202.7 m (665 ft)
- Transmitter coordinates: 50°9′45″N 110°57′23″W
- Translator(s): see § Transmitters

CHAT-TV (analogue channel 6) was a television station in Medicine Hat, Alberta, Canada, last affiliated with Citytv. Owned by the Jim Pattison Broadcast Group, the station had studios at 10 Boundary Road SE in the nearby town of Redcliff, and its transmitter was located near the Trans-Canada Highway and Range Road 80, northwest of Redcliff.

CHAT signed on the air on September 14, 1957, by Monarch Broadcasting Company Ltd. as a CBC Television affiliate serving Medicine Hat. It was then acquired by Jim Pattison Broadcasting in 2000 when it acquired the assets of Monarch. In 2008, CHAT became affiliated with Canwest's E! television system, since CICT (Global Calgary) was also available on cable systems in Medicine Hat; but when E! collapsed in 2009, Pattison transferred CHAT's affiliation to Rogers Media's Citytv system, adopting the scheduling grid of CKAL. In June 2025, the station ceased operations due to financial troubles by its parent.

This station also operated rebroadcasters in Pivot (CHAT-TV-1, channel 4) and Maple Creek, Saskatchewan (CHAT-TV-2, channel 6).

== History ==
=== CBC affiliation ===
CHAT-TV began broadcasting on September 14, 1957, on VHF channel 6, with a transmitter power output of 5,700 watts. The station was owned by Monarch Broadcasting Company Ltd., which was operated by J. H. "Hop" Yuill, and was co-owned with local radio station CHAT (1270 AM, now on 94.5 FM). CHAT-TV was the fourth television station in Alberta to sign on the air, and its launch was presided over by then-premier Ernest Manning.

CHAT-TV's first general manager was R.J. "Bob" Buss. The station operated from a modernized studio and office building, and transmitted from a 403-foot (123 m) tower located at Redcliff. Sid Gaffney was the first chief engineer, and Merv Stone was the production manager. In the beginning, the station began its daily operations at 5:30 p.m., with the only live programming being the 6 p.m. news bulletin. The remainder of programming arrived via train and consisted of 16 mm kinescope films of CBC programming that had originated one or two weeks earlier. Around 10% of the local commercials were done live, with the announcers having to ad-lib enough to last the full 60 seconds.

Other early CHAT-TV staff members include Bernie Pascall, Gary Buss, George Lund, Mike Darow and Duff Roman. Early local productions of note include Sock-Hop, a teenage dance show, quiz shows such as Teen Challenge and Cartoon Quiz, cooking shows, farming programs, and two music programs, Country Roundup (concentrating on western music), and Music For the Moderns, featuring local musicians.

Later that year, the station joined the Trans Canada Microwave relay, increasing the station's broadcast hours to from 10 a.m. to midnight. In 1961, a full-power rebroadcast transmitter was installed near Pivot, near the Alberta–Saskatchewan border, which improved the station's signal reach. In 1967, colour programming from the CBC arrived on CHAT, and local colour programs started in 1972.

In 1981, the main transmitter was relocated to Bowell, Alberta, and its power was increased to 58,000 watts. Other rebroadcasters were added in Maple Creek, Saskatchewan, and at Oyen, Alberta (which was owned by the community).

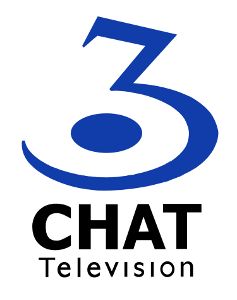
CHAT-TV old logo

In 1992, W. H. "Bill" Yuill, son of "Hop" Yuill, became the owner and president of Monarch Communications, which had expanded into other broadcasting and cable properties in Alberta and British Columbia. Over the years, Bob Buss was followed as general manager by Orv Kope, Dwaine Dietrich, Brian Bolli, Brian Ellis, and again by Dwaine Dietrich in 1996. David Sherwood took over in 2007 following the retirement of Dwaine Dietrich.

In 2000, the Canadian Radio-television and Telecommunications Commission (CRTC) approved the sale of Monarch's radio and television holdings (including CHAT-TV) to the Jim Pattison Broadcast Group, a division of the Jim Pattison Group.

=== E! affiliation ===
CHAT's logo used from 2008-2012 and is the basis of the current logo.

On February 28, 2008, the CRTC announced the approval of disaffiliation of CHAT from the CBC effective August 31, 2008. Documents filed with the CRTC indicate the station would then receive programming from CanWest Global. Global's Calgary station CICT-TV is available on cable in Medicine Hat; however, it does not reach the market over-the-air, while CHAT aired select Global programs simultaneously with CICT. On September 1, 2008, CHAT became the market's E! affiliate. Medicine Hat was the only over-the-air market served by E!, where a Global affiliate was not available locally.

It was announced that the transmitters of CHAT would not be replaced by the CBC. The market now receives CBC programming through CBRT, which is available on cable and satellite in Medicine Hat, as well as on CBCA-TV-1 12 in Etzikom, which previously rebroadcast CHAT-TV before the affiliation switch. Despite the region's tiny francophone population, Radio-Canada station CBXFT in Edmonton operated a rebroadcaster in Medicine Hat until the CBC shut down all of its analog transmitters on July 31, 2012.

=== Citytv affiliation and closure ===
On July 14, 2009, Pattison announced that CHAT and its other E! affiliates would begin receiving programming from Rogers Media's Citytv system starting September 1, although the stations did not begin to utilize any form of "Citytv" branding. Canwest had previously announced it would sell or close its E! stations, leaving the Pattison stations without a programming source.

On May 3, 2012, Rogers announced the renewal of the Citytv affiliation agreement with Jim Pattison Group, originally slated to expire in August 2012; under the agreement, CHAT began carrying 90% of Citytv's prime time schedule and the majority of its morning and daytime lineup (including a simulcast of the Calgary edition of Breakfast Television), largely following CKAL's schedule (with breakaways for CHAT's locally produced midday and evening newscasts) on September 1, 2012.

Historically, CHAT aired Hockey Night in Canada dating back to the days of CBC affiliation. However, when Rogers bought the national rights to the NHL in November 2013, the Pattison affiliates began to air Hockey Night once again in October 2014.

On June 3, 2025, Pattison Media announced that it would discontinue CHAT's operations, citing what it called "insurmountable" financial challenges. The station signed off at 9:30 a.m. that day.

== News operation ==
CHAT-TV carried 15 hours of locally produced newscasts each week (with three hours each weekday); the station did not produce any weekend newscasts. CHAT-TV's local newscasts were titled CHAT News; the station aired a 30-minute lunch hour newscast at noon with a repeat from 12:30 to 1 p.m., and a two-hour early evening news block from 5:30 to 7:30 p.m. A half-hour review of the week's news stories was seen Saturdays at 6 p.m., with repeat broadcasts on Sundays at 6 p.m. and Mondays at 6:30 a.m.

== Digital television ==
CHAT-TV never broadcast a digital signal.

According to a 2009 CRTC decision, CHAT-TV was not required to activate its digital signal, as Medicine Hat was not a mandatory market for digital conversion, which took place in most other markets on August 31, 2011. CHAT-DT had been allocated to UHF channel 36.

== Transmitters ==
Station	City of licence	Channel	ERP	HAAT	Transmitter coordinates
CHAT-TV-1	Pivot	4 (VHF)	4.9 kW	191.1 m	50°24′14″N 110°3′10″W
CHAT-TV-2	Maple Creek, SK	6 (VHF)	0.01 kW	NA	49°55′22″N 109°27′42″W
