= Pattison Outdoor Advertising =

Canadian out-of-home advertising company

- Company type: Division
- Industry: Out-of-home advertising
- Founded: 1998; 28 years ago
- Parent: Jim Pattison Group
- Website: www.pattisonoutdoor.com

Pattison Outdoor Advertising is a Canadian out-of-home advertising company owned by the Jim Pattison Group. According to the Canadian Out-of-Home Measurement Bureau, it was Canada's largest out-of-home advertising company in 2013, holding more than 55% of the national market share in horizontal posters and a 43% market share of all traditional out-of-home media.

The company provides out-of-home advertising displays and serves direct retail clients and advertising agencies. It has 25 sales offices in Canada and is headquartered in Mississauga, Ontario.

== History ==
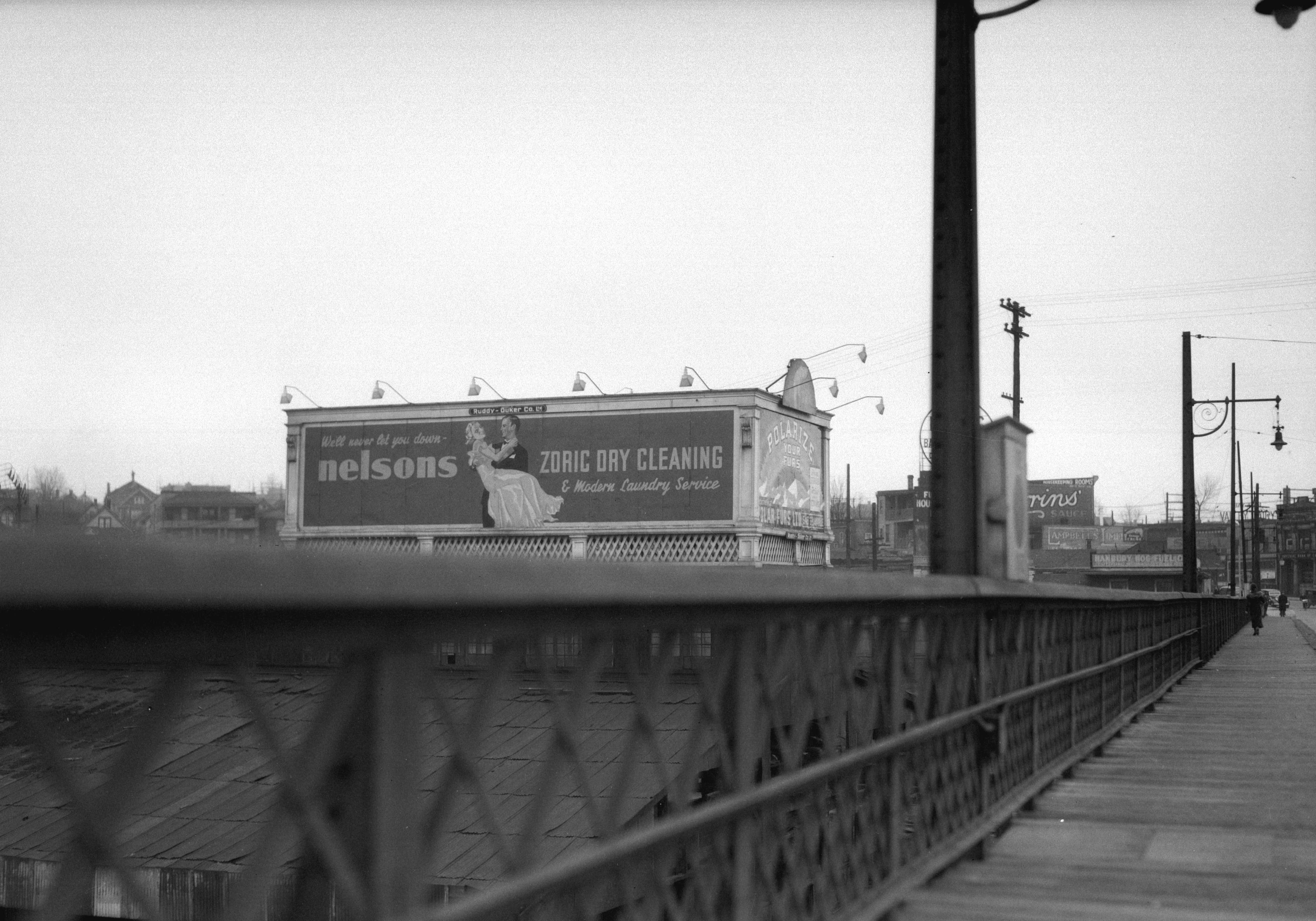
Lighted Ruddy-Duker Ltd. billboard advertising Nelsons Zoric Dry Cleaning and Modern Laundry Service on the west side of the Granville Street Bridge, Vancouver, 1932

In November 1967, the Jim Pattison Group entered the outdoor advertising industry with the acquisition of Seaboard Advertising. Seaboard was founded in 1908 as Bond & Ricketts Ltd. and was one of Canada's first outdoor advertising companies. The company name changed to Ruddy-Duker, and in 1936 it was sold to Neon Products. By 1946, the outdoor advertising portion of Neon Products business was a subsidiary company named Seaboard Advertising. By 1967, Jim Pattison had acquired all the shares of Neon Products/Seaboard and turned the public company into a private holding. Based in Burnaby, British Columbia, Seaboard served outdoor advertisers in British Columbia. The Seaboard name was retired in 1998 with the unification of all of Jim Pattison's outdoor advertising companies under the Pattison Outdoor Advertising name.

Hook Outdoor Advertising was founded as Hook Signs in Edmonton, Alberta in 1908 and incorporated as Hook Signs Ltd. in February 1913. The company was a major supplier of store identification, display, vehicle and gold leaf signage in the early days of Edmonton. It introduced some of the first neon signs in the city in 1939. In 1932, the company bought the billboards of the Ernest Willis Company in Calgary, Alberta and in 1936, the company bought the billboards of Ruddy Duker in Edmonton. Over the years, the billboard advertising business overtook the display signage business until by the 1970s Hook was predominantly an outdoor advertising company. The company expanded beyond Edmonton and Calgary and by 1985, it served cities throughout the province of Alberta. The Jim Pattison Group bought the shares of Hook Signs Ltd. in 1981 and turned the company into a private holding, Hook Outdoor Advertising. The Hook name was retired in 1998 with the unification of all of Jim Pattison's outdoor advertising companies under the Pattison Outdoor Advertising name.

Gould Outdoor Advertising was founded in Midland, Ontario in 1913. The company established billboard advertising displays throughout southwestern Ontario, establishing major plants in Brantford, Kitchener/Waterloo, St. Catharines, Niagara Falls and the Tobacco Belt Towns of the region. Gould was headquartered in Brantford. The company joined Seaboard and Hook as a Jim Pattison company in 1982. Merging in 1992 with Pillar Ad, another Pattison acquisition, Gould moved beyond its established markets in southwestern Ontario and embarked on a rapid expansion program in the Greater Toronto Area. The Gould name was retired in 1998 with the unification of all of Jim Pattison's outdoor advertising companies under the Pattison Outdoor Advertising name.

The transit advertising component of Pattison Outdoor is rooted in Trans Ad, a Canadian company founded in 1912. Trans Ad was acquired by the Jim Pattison Group in 1982. In 1990, the Trans Ad name and a portion of its operations were sold, and the balance of its operations was merged with Pattison-owned Seaboard Advertising, Hook Outdoor Advertising and Publicité Metrobus.

Pattison Outdoor Advertising was formed in 1998 through the union of the existing out of home advertising companies owned by the Jim Pattison Group.

Pattison Outdoor Advertising has traditional Outdoor Advertising posters in 300 cities and towns across Canada, from Vancouver Island on the west coast to St. John's, NL on the east coast. Beginning in 2008, the company has been building large-format L.E.D. digital billboards, and as of May 2013, has over 150 of these displays in 25 cities across Canada.

In March 2011, Pattison Outdoor Advertising acquired Onestop Media Group, designers and operators of digital advertising networks for the transportation, malls, sports retail, residential and hospitality industries.

In January 2012, the Toronto Transit Commission awarded the contract for TTC transit advertising rights to Pattison Outdoor, guaranteeing the TTC $324 million in revenue over the next 12 years, until the end of 2023. This new agreement included new elements such as increased advertising space on the commission's fleet of buses, streetcars and subway cars, as well as opening the possibility of subway station naming rights.

== Contracts ==
Pattison Outdoor currently holds transit advertising contracts with twenty-one municipal transit authorities, and a number of third parties which give Pattison access to sell into an additional thirteen markets, including Quebec, and Saskatchewan. Major markets represented include St. John's, Halifax, Saint John, Moncton, Fredericton, Quebec City, Montreal, Ottawa, Toronto, Winnipeg, Saskatoon, Regina, Calgary and Edmonton.

The company also sells advertising on BC Ferries properties and vessels and in ferry terminals operated by Halifax Metro Transit.

Airport advertising contracts include exterior advertising at the international airports in Halifax, Ottawa, Winnipeg, Edmonton and Calgary and interior advertising at Winnipeg James Armstrong Richardson International Airport and Calgary International Airport.

In terms of place-based advertising, Pattison has contracts with the property owners and managers of over 300 commercial shopping centres across Canada, as well as operating digital advertising networks in office towers, retail stores, residential buildings, hotels and transit stations platforms.

Pattison Outdoor Advertising media are measured and audited by the Canadian Out-of-Home Marketing & Measurement Bureau.

== Products ==
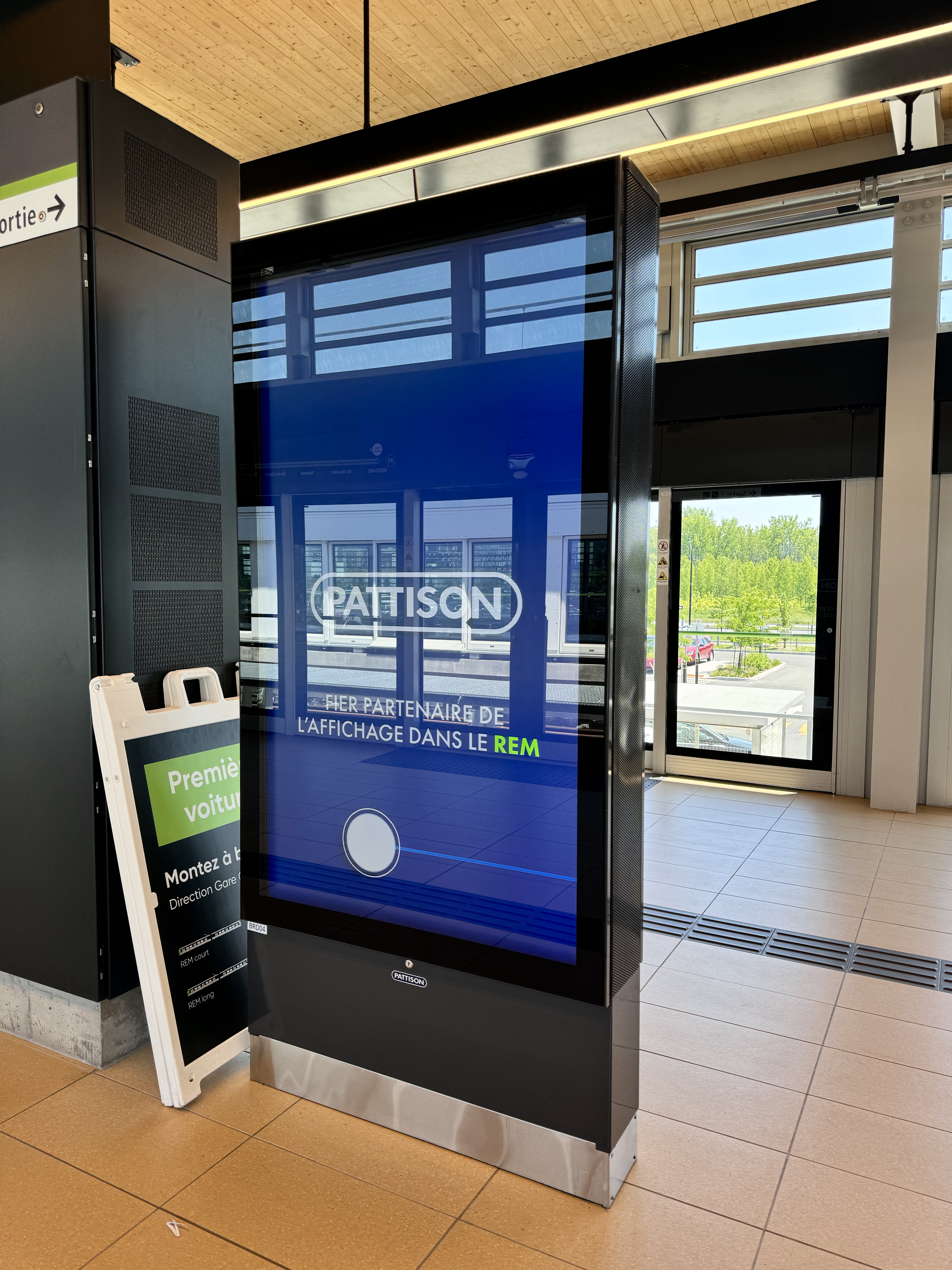
A modern Pattison digital sign at Brossard Station in Quebec

Pattison Outdoor Advertising's inventory includes the following out of home media:

- Billboards: horizontal, vertical, backlit and digital
- Large format: traditional and digital “superboards”, spectaculars and wall murals
- Street furniture: street level ads, transit shelter advertising and bus bench ads
- Mall media: posters, banners and customized vinyl displays
- Digital signage: malls, airports, office towers, residential towers, retail stores and hotels
- Transit advertising: subway, light rail and bus advertising, and stations
- Airport media: exterior, interior and parkade media.
- Ferry media; terminal and on-board advertising

== Accusations of climate change denial ==
In 2011, Pattison Outdoor Advertising disallowed Beyond Coal, who had bought billboard space on one of the company's billboards, from displaying an anti-coal message until references to the nearby Westshore Terminal, where 700 train cars of coal are loaded each day, were removed. In 2012, Greenpeace was engaged in talks with Pattison Outdoor Advertising to display a billboard advocating renewable energy sources, but the company abruptly terminated the discussions. When asked why the billboard would not be approved, the company refused to provide a reason. In 2014, Pattison Outdoor Advertising allowed Friends of Science to place a billboard opposed to the scientific consensus on climate change, which prompted organizations like Greenpeace to accuse Pattison Outdoor Advertising and the Jim Pattison Group as a whole of applying a double standard and censoring environmentalist messages.

== Membership ==
Pattison Outdoor is a member of:

- The Canadian Out-of-Home Marketing & Measurement Bureau (COMMB)
- Advertising Standards Canada
- The Outdoor Marketing Association of Canada (OMAC)
- The Outdoor Advertising Association of America (OAAA)
