= Lassonde Industries =

Canadian agri-food company

Lassonde Industries Inc.
- Company type: Public
- Traded as: TSX: LAS.A
- Founded: 1918; 108 years ago
- Founder: Aristide Lassonde
- Headquarters: Rougemont, Quebec, Canada
- Area served: Canada, United States
- Key people: Pierre-Paul Lassonde (Chairman)
- Number of employees: 2,100
- Subsidiaries: A.Lassonde, Apple & Eve, Clement Pappas & Company, Lassonde Specialties, Arista Wines, Oasis, Rougemont, Old Orchard Brands, Sun-Rype Products Ltd.
- Website: lassonde.com

Lassonde Industries Inc. is a Canadian agri-food company located in Rougemont, Montérégie, with operations throughout North America.

== History ==
Lassonde Industries Inc. acquired The Jim Pattison Group's indirect, wholly owned subsidiary Sun-Rype Products Ltd. for $80 million CAD, in an all cash deal expected to close before the end of the 2019 calendar year. As well, in announcing the purchase, it was reported that Sun-Rype had $164 million CAD in gross sales for their fiscal year ended September 30, 2019, and $9 million CAD in EBITDA.

== Activities ==
Lassonde Industries develops, produces, and markets a wide range of ready-to-drink fruit and vegetable juices and drinks. It also develops, produces, and markets specialized food products including fondue broths and sauces, soups, sauces, packaged corn on the cob, bruschetta toppings, tapenades, pestos, and pizza and pasta sauces. Finally, the company imports, packages, and markets wine from various countries, as well as apple cider and other wine-based beverages.
