= Old Orchard Brands =

Company

Old Orchard Brands, LLC
- Company type: Subsidiary
- Headquarters: Sparta, Michigan, United States
- Revenue: $103.3 million (2017)
- Parent: Lassonde Industries
- Website: oldorchard.com

Old Orchard Brands, LLC is a Sparta, Michigan-based juice company, owned by Lassonde Industries.

== History ==
The company began in 1985, as a producer of apple juice. The company began by selling predominantly apple-based frozen juice concentrates, and has since expanded its product line to include many shelf stable bottled juice varieties. The company’s bottled juice lines include juice cocktails, 100% juices and juice blends, organic juices, reduced-sugar juices, and antioxidant-rich super-premium juices. Currently, Old Orchard sells apple juice made from concentrate from, among others, China, and Ukraine.

Old Orchard is one of the fastest-growing companies in the juice category, and just expanded its product line further by launching its first ever tea products. These new tea blends contain a hint of fruit juice, are lightly sweetened, and are USDA certified organic. The company is now focusing most of its energy on "functional foods", offering organic, antioxidant-rich, and low sugar products Nutrition Insight. All of Old Orchard’s products are preservative-free, made from natural ingredients, and contain no artificial dyes. Old Orchard currently produces 30 varieties of frozen juice concentrate, and 62 bottled varieties.

In 2005, Old Orchard established a 4-year partnership with the Juvenile Diabetes Research Foundation (JDRF), based on the company's "Healthy Balance" line of products. The JDRF logo appears on the product packaging, and Old Orchard has agreed to support at least 75 of JDRF's "Walk to Cure Diabetes" events, and donate $560,000 towards diabetes research.

In April 2018, Canadian agri-food company Lassonde Industries agreed to purchase Old Orchard Brands for US$146 million.
