= CJNB =

Radio station in North Battleford, Saskatchewan

Coordinates: 52°50′30″N 108°18′23″W

- North Battleford, Saskatchewan; Canada
- Frequency: 1050 kHz
- Branding: 1050 CJNB

Programming
- Format: Country
- Affiliations: Battlefords North Stars

Ownership
- Owner: Jim Pattison Group
- Sister stations: CJCQ-FM, CJHD-FM, CJNS-FM

History
- First air date: 1947
- Call sign meaning: North Battleford

Technical information
- Class: B
- Power: 10,000 watts

Links
- Website: cjnb.com

CJNB is a Canadian radio station that broadcasts a country format at 1050 AM in North Battleford, Saskatchewan. Owned by the Jim Pattison Group, it is headquartered alongside its sister stations CJCQ-FM and CJHD-FM at 1711 100th Street in North Battleford.

== History and programming ==
The station was launched in 1947. Along with CJNS-FM, an FM satellite station in Meadow Lake, the stations serve a significant area of rural central Saskatchewan.

The station also broadcasts hockey games for the Battlefords North Stars of the SJHL.

In 2006, CJNB applied to convert from the AM dial to the FM dial at 102.9 MHz. That application was denied by the CRTC on January 4, 2007.

On July 10, 2014, Rawlco Communications announced the sale of its North Battleford radio stations to the Jim Pattison Group.
