= Sun-Rype =

Canadian food and beverage manufacturer

Sun-Rype Products Ltd.
- Sun-Rype corporate logo
- Type: Private
- Industry: Food and beverage
- Founded: May 13, 1946
- Founder: BC Fruit Growers Association
- Headquarters: 1165 Ethel Street; Kelowna, British Columbia; V1Y 2W4
- Products: Juice, Fruit snacks, Snacks, Cider, Sparkling tea
- Revenue: ▲CA$164 million (2019); CA$135.1 million (2007)
- Net income: ▲CA$9 million (2019); CA$4.6 million (2007)
- Number of employees: 395 (2006)
- Parent: Lassonde Industries, Inc.
- Website: www.sunrype.ca

Sun-Rype Products Ltd. is a Western Canadian fruit-based food and beverage manufacturer. Since its foundation in 1946, Sun-Rype has been producing juices and fruit snacks based in Kelowna, British Columbia, in the Okanagan.

== History ==
Incorporated on May 13, 1946, Sun-Rype was founded as BC Fruit Processing Ltd. This organization was founded by the BC Fruit Growers Association as a profitable alternative to use their process-grade apples in production rather than throwing them out. On April 2, 1959, after 13 years, BC Fruit Processing Ltd. changed its name to Sun-Rype Products Ltd.

In 1963, Sun-Rype teamed up with the Fraser Valley Milk Producers Association to distribute juice cartons on Vancouver milk routes. In 1979, it became the first juice manufacturing company in Canada to provide tetra packaging for its 250 ml and 1 L juice packs. Also, in 1992, it developed the 6 L bag in a box package. Since then, Sun-Rype has expanded manufacturing capabilities to include 1.36L PET plastic, 900ml Elopak, and a can line. The Kelowna facility also produces a range of snack products.

In 1996, Sun-Rype celebrated its 50th year in business. In recognition of this milestone, the mayor of Kelowna Jim Stuart honored Sun-Rype by declaring May 13, 1996 as "Sun-Rype Day".

=== Failed expansion to China ===
In November 1994, Sun-Rype announced plans to expand to China. The company signed a memorandum of understanding with Shanghai Jinqiao EPZ Scientific Development Co. Ltd. to produce and sell its juices in the Asian country. With a plant located in the Jinqiao Export Processing Zone in Pudong, Sun-Rype invested 65% of the $13 million project cost and anticipated to be selling its juices by the end of 1995.

This expansion plan almost immediately started to falter, and in 1997, Sun-Rype was forced to create a new joint venture with Lion Group, a Malaysian conglomerate. With this deal in place, Sun-Rype received land, equipment, and future working capital, while Lion Group took over ownership of the Asian subsidiary.

By 1998, after net losses of $5.8 million in 1997, the venture was not proving to be profitable, so in March of that same year, Sun-Rype decided to pull out of the Chinese market. The company absorbed $4.4 million in losses.

=== Hostile takeover attempt ===
In July 1996, Clearly Canadian Beverage Corporation initiated a $40 million hostile takeover bid of Sun-Rype. The reasons behind this attempt were to immediately double Clearly Canadian's revenues and give it use of Sun-Rype's bottling plant, thus centralizing its production facilities. In order to initiate the takeover, Clearly Canadian began buying as many shares as possible from local apple growers who had been issued the shares over the last five decades in return for the process-grade apples used in production by Sun-Rype. At the time of the takeover attempt, Sun-Rype was still a co-operative organization, not a public company, so there were few ways for shareholders to sell their shares.

Shareholders were given the option of either one Clearly Canadian share per Sun-Rype share, or $1.61 and a half of a Clearly Canadian share per Sun-Rype share. This offer finally gave true financial value to the shares, inclining many shareholders to sell them. Both Sun-Rype's board of directors and the BC Fruit Growers Association argued against the takeover attempt to shareholders, and on July 18, the board of directors offered an 18–page document detailing why shareholders should refrain from selling. On July 24, just days later, Clearly Canadian also sent out a document describing to shareholders why they should sell their shares. Both of these documents contained invalid and misleading information about each company, such as share values and purchase options to shareholders, so on July 31, the British Columbia Securities Commission issued an order for both companies to correct the statements.

With the bid offer expiry date of August 7 approaching, Clearly Canadian decided to extend its offer expiration date to August 19. It claimed it was doing this to give shareholders more time to decide whether or not to sell their shares. This extension caused further rifts between the two companies, with Sun-Rype claiming reason for the extension, while Clearly Canadian stayed focused on acquiring as many shares as possible. With the final bid deadline fast approaching, Clearly Canadian used many tactics in an attempt to gain more shares, including sending out circulars, hosting public receptions, and talking to community press. In the end however, Sun-Rype, which spent $741,000 fighting the takeover, was able to prevail over Clearly Canadian, losing only 15.8% of its shares to the beverage corporation.

=== Initial public offering ===
The hostile takeover attempt by Clearly Canadian proved how unsatisfied shareholders were with Sun-Rype management styles and caused differences within the company, apple growing community, and investors. As a result, Sun-Rype finally went public on the Toronto Stock Exchange on November 12, 1996, with 2.35 million shares opening at $2.75 a share. It used the profits from the offering to pay off a $6.3 million bank debt and help fund its new Chinese operation.

=== From public corporation to private ===
In September 2013, Sun-Rype Products Ltd. became privately owned by the Jim Pattison Group.

=== Sale to Lassonde Industries Inc. ===
On October 29, 2019, The Jim Pattison Group sold its wholly owned subsidiary Sun-Rype to Lassonde Industries Inc. for CA$80 million, in an all cash deal expected to close before the end of the current calendar year. As well, in announcing the sale, it was reported that Sun-Rype had CA$164 million in gross sales for their fiscal year ended September 30, 2019, and CA$9 million in EBITDA.

== Products ==
=== Juices and beverages ===
SunRype's flagship product is not from concentrate apple juice which is also known as "Blue Label" apple juice. SunRype was the first to combine fruit and vegetable together in a juice.

=== Snacks ===
In the early 1990s the company expanded into snack foods with the launch of Fruit to Go, a 100% fruit snack made with fruit juices and purees, followed by Energy to Go in 1999, which was replaced by FruitSource in 2005. SunRype Energy and Fruit & Chia bars moved the brand beyond 100% fruit to incorporate new ingredients such as oats, seeds, protein and chocolate. In 2016, SunRype re-positioned its snack lineup as gluten free, nut free, vegan and kosher. Further to this strategy, SunRype released Good Bites, a date-based snack.

=== Cider and iced tea expansion ===
In 2017, expanded its beverage portfolio and began selling cider in private liquor stores in BC and Alberta under the SunRype brand name. The company also introduced a line of iced teas in 355ml tall cans, called SunRype Sparkling Tea.
