= CKLF-FM =

Radio station in Brandon, Manitoba

Coordinates: 49.8399°N 99.9213°W

- Brandon, Manitoba; Canada
- Broadcast area: Westman Region
- Frequency: 94.7 MHz
- Branding: 94.7 Star FM

Programming
- Format: Hot adult contemporary
- Affiliations: Premiere Networks

Ownership
- Owner: Jim Pattison Group
- Sister stations: CKLQ-FM

History
- First air date: June 2000

Technical information
- Class: C
- ERP: 100,000 watts
- HAAT: 325.6 metres (1068.2 feet)

Links
- Webcast: Listen Live
- Website: starfm.ca

CKLF-FM (94.7 FM, "94.7 Star FM") is a radio station in Brandon, Manitoba. Owned by the Jim Pattison Group, it broadcasts a hot adult contemporary format serving the Westman Region.

Its studios are co-located with sister station CKLQ-FM at 624 14th Street East, on Brandon's northeast side.

== History ==
On September 17, 1999, the Canadian Radio-television and Telecommunications Commission (CRTC) approved an application by Riding Mountain Broadcasting for a new FM radio station on 94.7 FM in Brandon, proposing an adult contemporary format.

In 2003, Westman Communication Group acquired Riding Mountain Broadcasting. In September 2022, Westman announced that it would sell CKLF and CKLQ to the Jim Pattison Group to focus more on its telecom business.
