= CKCE-FM =

Radio station in Calgary

Coordinates: 51°03′37″N 114°10′17″W

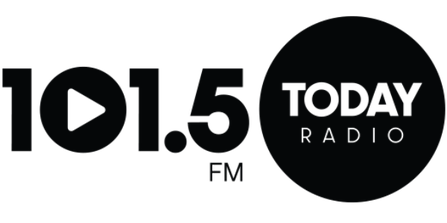
- Calgary, Alberta; Canada
- Broadcast area: Calgary Metropolitan Region
- Frequency: 101.5 MHz
- Branding: 101.5 Today Radio

Programming
- Format: Hot adult contemporary

Ownership
- Owner: Jim Pattison Group
- Sister stations: CKWD-FM

History
- First air date: March 22, 2007
- Call sign meaning: Calgary Energy (broadcast area and original branding)

Technical information
- Class: C1
- ERP: 48 kWs (maximum 100 kWs)
- HAAT: 160 meters (520 ft)

Links
- Website: 1015todayradio.com

CKCE-FM (101.5 FM, 101.5 Today Radio) is a radio station in Calgary. Owned by the Jim Pattison Group, it broadcasts a hot adult contemporary format with some segments of hot talk and listener interaction.

CKCE's studios are located on 58th Avenue Southwest in Calgary, while its transmitter is located on Patina Hill Drive Southwest in the Prominence Point neighbourhood in western Calgary.

As of Winter 2020, CKCE is the third-most-listened-to radio station in the Calgary market according to a PPM data report released by Numeris.

== History ==
The station was originally approved by the CRTC in 2006 from an application submitted by CHUM Limited (prior to the announcement of its merger with CTVglobemedia). However, because the original application requested the 90.3 frequency, which was granted instead to Newcap Broadcasting for what would become CFUL-FM, the approval was made conditional on the station submitting a revised application for a different frequency. The station subsequently applied for the 101.5 frequency, which was granted by the CRTC in January 2007.

CKCE-FM began testing on March 12, 2007, stunting with a loop of "Wannabe" by the Spice Girls, and officially launched on March 22 at 1:01 p.m. with a rhythmic hot adult contemporary format as Energy 101.5. In June 2009, following the relaunch of CFUL as top 40 station CKMP-FM, CKCE segued to hot adult contemporary, and replaced most of its rhythmic music with pop rock. In early 2010, the station rebranded as 101.5 Energy FM and began to reinstate rhythmic music to compete with the recently relaunched CIGY-FM.

On August 17, 2010, CKCE flipped back to rhythmic adult contemporary as Kool 101.5.

As part of Bell Media's acquisition of Astral Media, Bell chose to divest CKCE-FM to meet ownership limits. On May 16, 2013, the Jim Pattison Group announced a deal to acquire CKCE-FM and two Winnipeg stations for an undisclosed amount. CKCE-FM was consolidated into the facilities of its forthcoming sister station CHPK-FM.

On December 20, 2013, the CRTC approved Jim Pattison's acquisition of CKCE-FM; the acquisition was closed in early 2014. With the sale, CKCE began transitioning back towards a mainstream hot AC format by dropping the rhythmic lean, reduced its focus on 1980s and 1990s hits, and began adding more pop rock currents and recurrents, as well as slightly rebranding to 101.5 Kool FM.

On February 26, 2019, the station rebranded as 101.5 Today Radio, maintaining a hot AC format and most of its airstaff, while restoring 1990s and 1980s hits to its playlist. The format carries a heavy emphasis on topical discussions and interactions between listeners and DJs. The station also added Crash & Mars from Edmonton sister station CKNO-FM in evenings. In 2024, as part of budget cuts, its local Mornings With Bo and Jess show was dropped and replaced with Crash & Mars.
