= CJXX-FM =

Radio station in Grande Prairie

Coordinates: 55°28′44″N 118°45′09″W

- Grande Prairie, Alberta; Canada
- Frequency: 93.1 MHz
- Branding: Big Country 93.1

Programming
- Format: Country

Ownership
- Owner: Jim Pattison Group
- Sister stations: CIKT-FM

History
- First air date: December 16, 1979
- Former frequencies: 1450 kHz (1979–1991); 840 kHz (1991–2000)

Technical information
- Licensing authority: CRTC
- Class: C1
- ERP: 100 kW
- HAAT: 268.5 metres (881 ft)

Links
- Webcast: Live Stream
- Website: bigcountry931.ca

CJXX-FM (93.1 MHz) is a radio station in Grande Prairie, Alberta, Canada. Owned by the Jim Pattison Group, the station broadcasts a country format.

== History ==
The station originally began broadcasting on 1430 kHz (AM) on December 16, 1979, received approval to move to 840 AM in 1991 and then to its current FM frequency in November 2000.
