= CHBZ-FM =

Radio station in Cranbrook, British Columbia

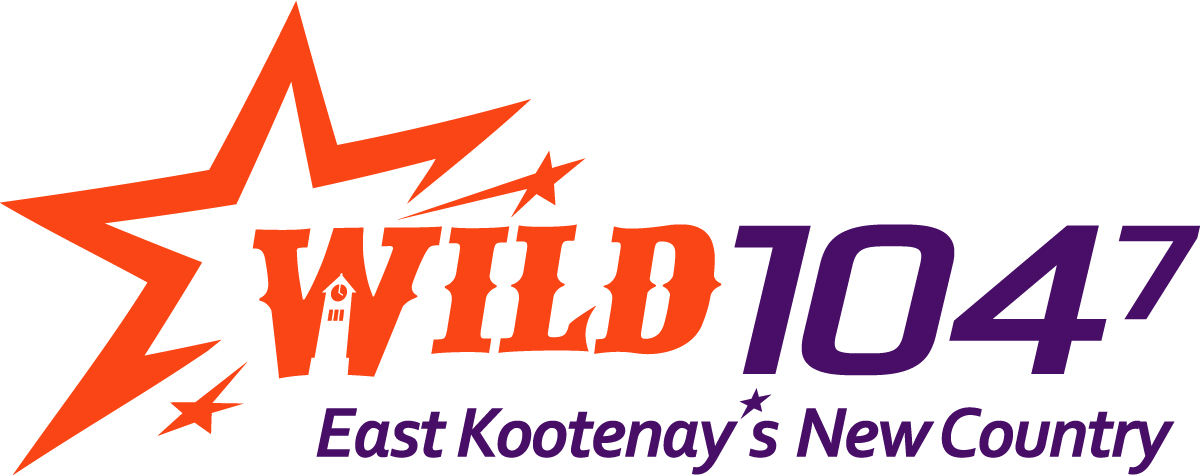
- Cranbrook, British Columbia; Canada
- Broadcast area: Cranbrook and Fernie
- Frequency: 104.7 MHz
- Branding: Wild 104.7

Programming
- Format: Country

Ownership
- Owner: Jim Pattison Group
- Sister stations: CHDR-FM

History
- First air date: 1995
- Former call signs: CKKR (1995–2000)

Technical information
- Class: C
- ERP: 1.264 kWs horizontal polarization only
- HAAT: 1,048 metres (3,438 ft)
- Transmitter coordinates: 49°27′33.84″N 115°37′48.00″W

Links
- Webcast: Listen Live
- Website: wild1047.ca

CHBZ-FM (104.7 FM, Wild 104.7 - East Kootenay's New Country) is a radio station in Cranbrook, British Columbia. Owned by Pattison Media, it broadcasts a country format.

== History ==
The station originally began broadcasting in 1995 as CKKR until it was changed to the current callsign in 2000 as CHBZ. In 2004, CHBZ was given approval by the Canadian Radio-television and Telecommunications Commission (CRTC) to add a transmitter at 92.7 FM in Fernie.

In October 2022, the station rebranded from B104 to Wild 104.7 - East Kootenay's New Country, adapted from Calgary sister station CKWD-FM.

== Rebroadcasters ==
Rebroadcasters of CHBZ-FM
| City of licence | Identifier | Frequency | Power | Class |
|---|---|---|---|---|
| Fernie | CFBZ-FM | 92.7 FM | (Horizontal polarization only); 150 watts | LP |
