= CIKT-FM =

Radio station in Grande Prairie

Coordinates: 55°28′44″N 118°45′09″W

- Grande Prairie, Alberta; Canada
- Frequency: 98.9 MHz
- Branding: 98.9 Rewind Radio

Programming
- Format: Adult hits

Ownership
- Owner: Jim Pattison Group
- Sister stations: CJXX-FM

History
- First air date: April 9, 2007

Technical information
- Class: C1
- ERP: 100 kW
- HAAT: 266.4 metres (874 ft)

Links
- Webcast: Listen live
- Website: www.989rewindradio.com

CIKT-FM (98.9 MHz) is a radio station in Grande Prairie, Alberta, Canada. Owned by Jim Pattison Group, the station broadcasts a adult hits format.

== History ==
The station was originally granted a CRTC license on November 15, 2006, authorizing it to broadcast on 103.3 FM. After early testing determined that its planned transmitter site was not suitable, the station applied for a license amendment to move its transmitter and to change its frequency to 98.9.

The station began broadcasting on April 9, 2007 at 12:00PM as Q99, airing a hot adult contemporary format.

The station was purchased by Pattison Media in October 2015.

In 2019, the station moved towards an adult hits format, focusing on music from the 1970s to the 2000s.

In September 2021, the station rebranded to 98.9 Rewind Radio.

== General Information ==
98.9 "Rewind Radio" or CIKT-FM promotes "Hold on a sec", a daily game in which an individual hears a second of a song, and calls the official number to guess the song name. If guessed correctly, a prize is granted. The first day is a $25 giftcard to the following places: Montanas, Walmart, JYSK, and State and Mains Restaurant. If 2 days go by, it becomes $50, and it continues until it reaches $200, or 8 days. Then, they switch songs. Sometimes, the prize isn't a giftcard but actually a homemade barbecue sauce.

== Former logo ==
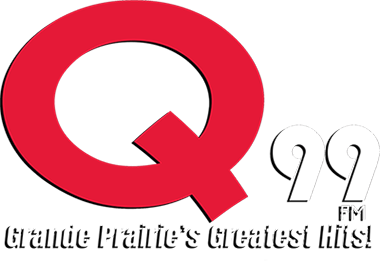
