= CKLQ-FM =

Radio station in Brandon, Manitoba

Coordinates: 49°37′11″N 99°48′21″W

- Brandon, Manitoba; Canada
- Broadcast area: Westman Region
- Frequency: 91.5 MHz
- Branding: Q Country 91.5 FM

Programming
- Format: Country
- Affiliations: Brandon Wheat Kings

Ownership
- Owner: Jim Pattison Group
- Sister stations: CKLF-FM

History
- First air date: October 1977 (AM); April 27, 2017 (FM)
- Former frequencies: 1570 kHz (1977–1985); 880 kHz (1985–2025)

Technical information
- Licensing authority: CRTC
- Class: C
- ERP: 100,000 watts
- HAAT: 630.4 metres (2,068 ft)

Links
- Webcast: Listen Live
- Website: qcountryfm.ca

CKLQ-FM (Q Country 91.5 FM) is a commercial FM radio station in Brandon, Manitoba, Canada, carrying a country format. The station is owned and operated by Pattison Media Ltd. CKLQ-FM, along with sister station CKLF-FM, has their radio studios and offices at 624 14th Street East, on Brandon's east end.

CKLQ-FM has an effective radiated power (ERP) of 100,000 watts, the current maximum for Canadian FM stations. CKLQ was powered at 10,000 watts, day and night.

Until the end of August 2025, the station had a nested rebroadcaster at 880 kHz, CKLQ. Because 880 AM is a clear channel frequency reserved for Class A station WHSQ in New York City, the class B CKLQ featured a directional signal at all times. At night, when radio waves travel farther, it used a four-tower array to prevent interference to WHSQ.

== History ==
CKLQ started broadcasting on March 28 1977 at a frequency of 1570 kHz and moved to its 880 frequency in 1985.

On January 6, 2016, the CRTC approved Riding Mountain's application to convert CKLQ to 91.5 MHz with an effective radiated power of 100,000 watts (non-directional antenna with an effective height of antenna above average terrain of 325.6 metres). Riding Mountain also received approval for an AM rebroadcasting transmitter which would operate on CKLQ's current frequency and technical parameters, at 880 kHz (class B) with a daytime and nighttime transmitter power of 10,000 watts.

CKLQ-FM signed on the air on Thursday, April 27, 2017, at 4:15 p.m., rebranding as Q Country 91.5 FM.

In September 2022, Westman announced the sale of CKLQ and CKLF to Pattison Media.

On August 13, 2025, Pattinson received approval from the CRTC to wind down operations on 880 AM after August 31, citing high maintenance costs for transmitter repairs and securing the AM transmitter site to the satisfaction of Safety Code 6, which requires proper fencing for EMF exposure limits.
