= Citytv =

Canadian television network owned by Rogers Communications

- Type: Broadcast television network
- Country: Canada
- Broadcast area: Canada; Colombia
- Affiliates: See § Citytv stations
- Headquarters: Rogers Building, Toronto, Ontario, Canada

Programming
- Language: English

Ownership
- Owner: Rogers Communications
- Parent: Rogers Sports & Media
- Key people: Tony Staffieri - Rogers Communications Interim President & CEO; Jordan Banks - President of Rogers Sports & Media; Bart Yabsley - President, Sportsnet and NHL Network, Rogers Sports & Media
- Sister channels: Omni Television; Sportsnet; Bravo; FX; FXX; TSC; Discovery Channel; Investigation Discovery; HGTV; Food Network; Magnolia Network; Citytv (Bogotá) Former: CP24 (1998–2007); NewNet/A-Channel (1995–2007); ASN (1983–2008); MuchMusic (1984–2007); MuchMoreMusic (1998–2007); Bravo! (1995–2007); Star! (1999–2007); FashionTelevision (2001–2007); Access (1995–2007); Space (1997–2007); Cooking Channel (2001–2007); BookTelevision (2001–2007); Drive-In Classics (2001–2007); WWE Network (2014–2024)

History
- Launched: September 28, 1972, 53 years ago (First aired in Toronto); July 22, 2002, 23 years ago (first national expansion); February 4, 2013, 13 years ago (current national footprint)
- Founder: Phyllis Switzer, Moses Znaimer, Jerry Grafstein and Edgar Cowan, among others
- Former names: City (December 2012–September 2018)

Links
- Website: www.citytv.com

Availability

Streaming media
- Amazon Prime: Over-the-top TV

Citytv (sometimes shortened to City, which was the network's official branding from 2012 to 2018) is a Canadian television network owned by the Rogers Sports & Media subsidiary of Rogers Communications. The network consists of six owned-and-operated (O&O) television stations located in the metropolitan areas of Toronto, Montreal, Winnipeg, Calgary, Edmonton, and Vancouver, a cable-only service that serves the province of Saskatchewan, and two independently owned affiliates serving smaller cities in British Columbia. A station serving Bogotá, Colombia, also has used the brand name.

The Citytv brand name originates from its flagship station, CITY-TV in Toronto, a station that began broadcasting in the former Electric Circus nightclub on September 28, 1972. It was known for an intensely local format based on newscasts aimed at younger viewers, nightly movies, and music and cultural programming. The Citytv brand first expanded with then-parent company CHUM Limited's acquisition of former Global owned-and-operated station CKVU-TV in Vancouver, followed by its purchase of Craig Media's stations and the re-branding of its A-Channel system in Central Canada as Citytv in August 2005. CHUM Limited was acquired by CTVglobemedia (now Bell Media) in 2007; to comply with Canadian Radio-television and Telecommunications Commission (CRTC) ownership limits, the Citytv stations were sold to Rogers. The network grew through further affiliations with three Jim Pattison Group-owned stations, along with Rogers's acquisition of the cable-only Saskatchewan Communications Network and Montreal's CJNT-DT. At one point, Citytv also existed in Barcelona and San Juan, Puerto Rico.

Although patterned after the original station in Toronto, since the 2000s and particularly since its acquisition by Rogers, Citytv has moved towards a series-based prime time schedule much like its competitors'. However it still focuses on younger demographics. It is the third English language television network in Canada.

== Early beginnings ==
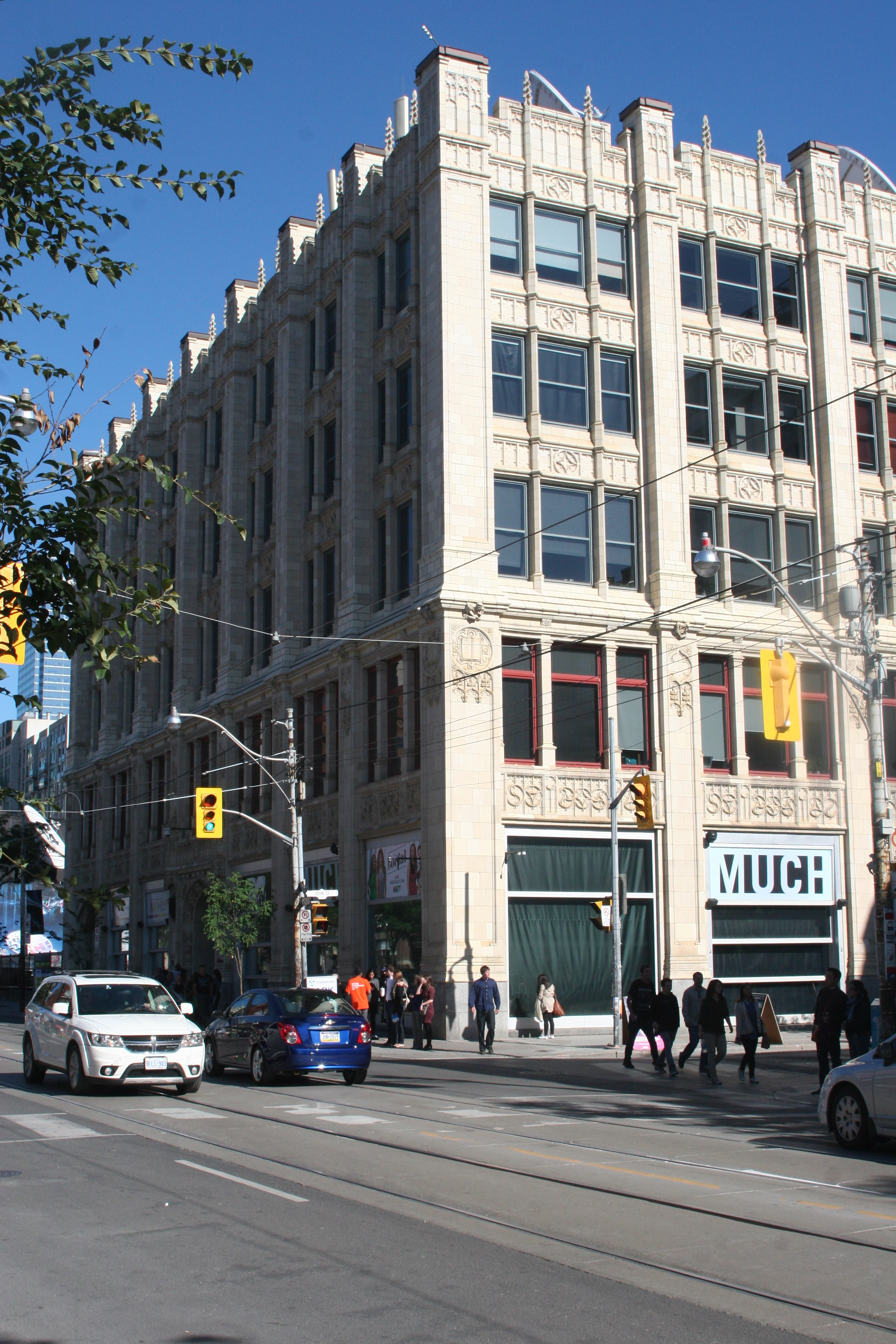
299 Queen Street West, the previous home of Citytv Toronto from 1987 to 2009

The licence of the original Citytv station, granted the callsign of CITY-TV by the CRTC, was awarded in Toronto on November 25, 1971, by Channel Seventy-Nine Ltd., which consisted of – among others – Phyllis Switzer, Moses Znaimer, Jerry Grafstein and Edgar Cowan. The four principal owners raised over $2 million to help start up the station, with Grafstein raising about 50% of the required funds, Znaimer raising around 25%, and the remainder being accrued by Switzer and Cowan. CITY-TV began broadcasting on September 28, 1972, for the first time using the "Citytv" brand and initially operated as an independent station, and its transmitter operated at an effective radiated power of 31 kW. It began operation using UHF channel 79. The station operated from studio facilities located at 99 Queen Street East, near Church Street, at the former Electric Circus nightclub.

The station lost money early on, and was in debt by 1975. Multiple Access Ltd. (the owners of CFCF-TV in Montreal) purchased a 45% interest in the station, and sold its stake to CHUM Limited, the parent company of CKVR-TV in Barrie, Ontario, in 1978.

On May 1, 1976, the station's main transmitter began broadcasting at 208 kW from the CN Tower. The station switched channel allocations on July 1, 1983, moving to UHF channel 57, the result of Industry Canada's decision to reassign frequencies corresponding to high-band UHF channels 70 to 83 to the new AMPS mobile phone systems as a result of a CCIR international convention in 1982.

In 1981, CITY was purchased outright by CHUM with the sale of Moses Znaimer's interest in the station. Znaimer remained with the station as an executive until 2003, when he retired from his management role but continued to work with the station on some production projects. CITY and the other CHUM-owned television properties moved their operations to the company's headquarters at 299 Queen Street West in May 1987, which became one of the most recognizable landmarks in the city. On March 30, 1998, CHUM launched CablePulse 24 (CP24), a local cable news channel whose programming used anchors from and featured reports filed by CITY-TV's news staff, rebroadcasts of the station's CityPulse newscasts and select programming from CITY and other CHUM stations.

== Expansion beyond Toronto ==
CHUM added CITY-TV's three rebroadcast transmitters in Woodstock (CITY-TV-2 on channel 31, which also served nearby London) on September 1, 1986, while another transmitter was set up in Ottawa in 1996 (CITY-TV-3 on channel 65).

CITY-TV's groundbreaking format became successful when CHUM dropped CKVR's longtime affiliation with CBC Television on September 1, 1995 and relaunched it as an independent station. Eventually, CHUM began to replicate the format when it acquired four Ontario stations from Baton Broadcasting in 1997, namely CHRO in Pembroke, CFPL-TV in London, CKNX-TV in Wingham, and CHWI-TV in Windsor. Most of these stations were also former CBC affiliates, and in markets where CKVR's sister station, CITY-TV, was already or subsequently became available on basic cable.

Until 1997, CHUM owned two television outlets in Atlantic Canada: the ATV system of CTV affiliates, and cable-only channel ASN. Many Citytv programs were aired on ASN during this period, effectively making ASN an unbranded Citytv O&O. Both ATV and ASN were acquired by Baton Broadcasting (now Bell Media) in 1997; ASN continued to air much of the Citytv schedule until it became part of the A (now CTV 2) television system in 2008. This means that Atlantic Canada is now the largest gap in City's local coverage area, and there are few remaining realistic options for Rogers to purchase or affiliate with existing stations in the region. This had led Rogers to attempt, unsuccessfully, to request simultaneous substitution privileges for Citytv Toronto on its cable systems in New Brunswick and Newfoundland and Labrador. Prior to the CRTC's decision to refuse the request, Rogers had hinted that a similar agreement had been tentatively reached with EastLink, the main cable provider in Nova Scotia and Prince Edward Island.

In 2000, after Canwest Global Communications acquired the assets of Western International Communications which led to a network shuffle in Vancouver, CHUM applied to the CRTC to acquire CKVU-TV (Global Vancouver) on July 26, 2001 for $175 million, with the intention of making it a newest Citytv station. CHUM planned on spending $8.03 million on British Columbia-based independent productions, $5.95 million on local news and information programming, and $1.37 million on local culture, social policy, and talent development over a period of seven years. A similar application was filed in 1996 by the CRTC but was dropped in favor of Baton launching CIVT-TV in 1997. CHUM gained CRTC approval for its acquisition of CKVU on October 15, 2001. Meanwhile, CIVI-TV in Victoria, British Columbia went on the air in October 2001 using the same format as CITY-TV. CKVU became known as "Citytv Vancouver" on July 22, 2002. Prior to CHUM's acquisition of CKVU, some Citytv programming were split between KVOS-TV in Bellingham, Washington, which is close to Vancouver, and CTV-owned CIVT-TV, during the 1990s and early 2000s when Citytv did not have a station in Vancouver; CHAN-TV, then a CTV affiliate, also aired some Citytv programs, such as CityLine. The WIC stations in Alberta (including CITV-TV and CICT-TV) bought provincial rights to some Citytv programs prior to the launch of CKAL and CKEM in 1997.

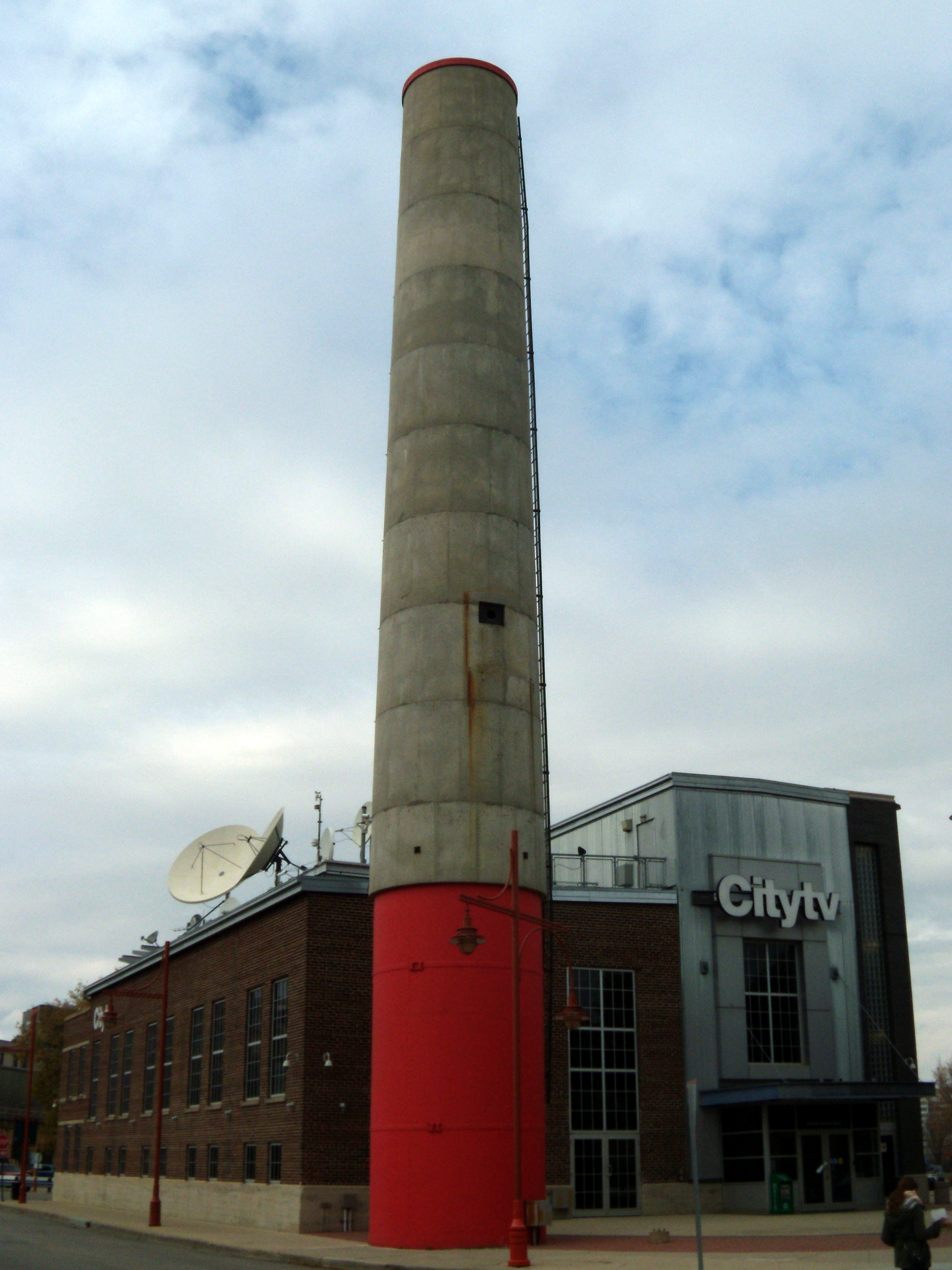
Citytv Building at The Forks, in Winnipeg, Manitoba

On April 12, 2004, CHUM Limited announced a deal to purchase Craig Media for $265 million. The move came more than a month after the CRTC denied CHUM's applications for new Calgary and Edmonton stations, which they applied back in 2003, because the market did not have sufficient advertising revenue to support a new entrant. The sale was approved by the Canadian Radio-television and Telecommunications Commission on November 19, 2004. CHUM had to sell off Toronto 1 because it already owned stations in Toronto and nearby Barrie; Toronto 1 was sold to Quebecor Media, owners of the media units TVA and Sun Media.

In February 2005, CHUM announced it would align Craig's A-Channel stations with its existing major-market stations under the Citytv brand. No other significant changes were made, since the A-Channel stations's on-air look had always been very similar to that of Citytv; they initially retained their local programs, relaunched under Citytv's Breakfast Television morning brand and CityNews news brand. CHUM hoped to lift the ratings of the stations with the new moniker. The change took effect on August 2 of the same year, when the A-Channel name was transferred to CHUM's NewNet stations.

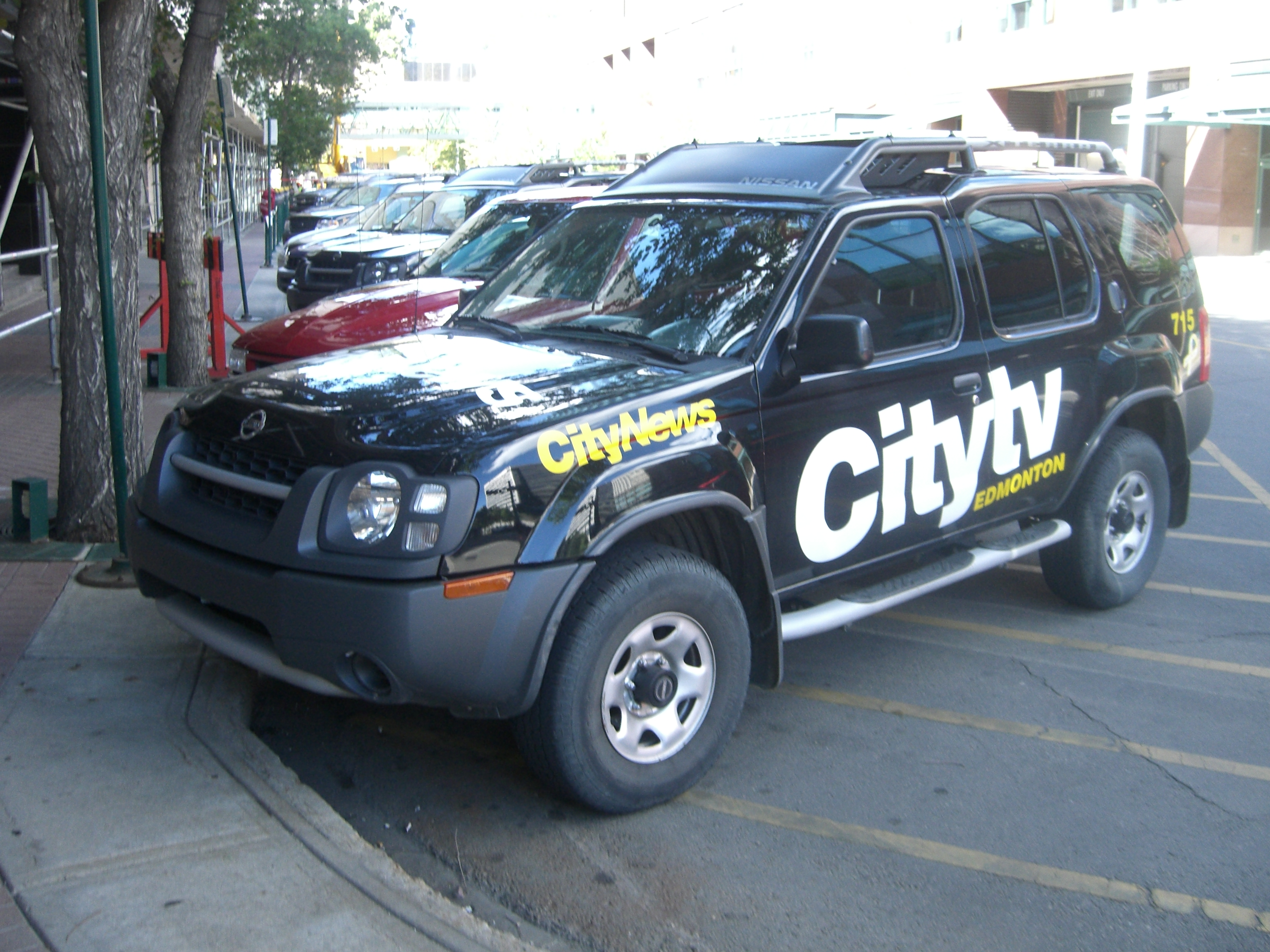
Citytv news vehicle in Edmonton

On July 12, 2006, CHUM announced that it would dramatically reduce its newsgathering operations in Vancouver, Edmonton, Calgary, and Winnipeg, as well as in several other cities. It laid off 281 part- and full-time employees, effectively cancelleing its supper-hour, late-night and weekend newscasts, laying off hundreds of news department staff among 281 job cuts. In a coincidental development, that same day, BCE Inc., owner of Bell Globemedia and the parent company of CTV, announced it would buy CHUM Limited.

== Ownership changes ==
Bell Globemedia had intended to retain CHUM's Citytv system while divesting CHUM's A-Channel stations and Alberta cable channel Access to get the CRTC to approve the acquisition.

In October 2006, Citytv launched a daily national newscast, CityNews International, which was produced in Toronto for broadcast on the western Canadian stations and on CHUM's Toronto news channel CP24. The Edmonton and Calgary stations also began broadcasting a daily 30-minute magazine show, Your City, instead of a full-fledged newscast. The Vancouver news operation, which had operated for 30 years under various owners and station identities, was not maintained aside from Breakfast Television. In the same month, Citytv Toronto became the first television station in Canada to begin broadcasting its local newscasts in high definition.

The following year on June 8, the CRTC approved the CTV takeover of CHUM. However, the CRTC made the deal conditional on CTV divesting itself of Citytv, because there were already CTV owned-and-operated stations serving the same cities (CFTO-TV Toronto, CIVT-TV Vancouver, CFCN-TV Calgary, CFRN-TV Edmonton, and CKY-TV Winnipeg). Without the divestment, CTV would have exceeded the CRTC's concentration of media ownership limits. CTV announced on June 11, 2007, that it would retain the A-Channel stations, and sell the Citytv stations to Rogers Communications for $375 million. The transaction was approved by the CRTC on September 28 and was completed on October 31, 2007. On September 8, 2009, CITY Toronto moved to Yonge-Dundas Square (now Sankofa Square) at 33 Dundas Street East.

Logo used from 2012–2018 when branded as "City"

On December 6, 2010, CityNews Tonight Toronto anchor and continuity announcer Mark Dailey died after a long battle with cancer. The Citytv system began to phase in a modified branding in October 2012, with a new logo consisting only of the name "City", and some promotions using the verbal branding "City Television" (later also switched to simply "City") instead of "Citytv". The change marked the first major alteration to the "Citytv" brand since its introduction in 1972. The network adopted the name "City" on December 31, 2012, during its New Year's Eve special. For the 2018–19 television season, the network reintroduced its original "Citytv" branding, and its social media accounts.

Rogers moved Citytv's Toronto operations to the Rogers Building at Bloor and Mount Pleasant in March 2025.

== Transformation into a television network ==
The Jim Pattison Group announced in July 2009 that its three television stations in western Canada (CKPG-TV, CFJC-TV, and CHAT-TV), formerly affiliated with E!, would join Citytv starting on September 1, 2009. These stations do not carry the Citytv branding; instead, the stations continue to use the same branding and logos they used as affiliates of the E! system. The Pattison-owned Citytv affiliates produce local newscasts, but do not produce their own versions of Breakfast Television nor title their midday and evening newscasts under the CityNews brand like the Citytv owned-and-operated stations do. Through a long-term affiliation renewal agreement on May 3, 2012, the Pattison stations began to carry 90% of Citytv's primetime programming and the majority of its morning and daytime programming from the programming grid of CKVU-DT, including simulcasts of the Vancouver edition of Breakfast Television. Unlike CKVU, the Pattison stations continue to produce midday and evening local newscasts.

Meanwhile, on December 20, 2011, Bluepoint Investment Corporation announced an affiliation agreement with Rogers Communications to air Citytv programming on the Saskatchewan Communications Network (SCN) from 3 p.m.-6 a.m. CT daily, beginning on January 2, 2012. This program block followed the national program grid of Citytv and was known on-air as "Citytv on SCN". Shortly after, on January 17, 2012, Rogers announced its intent to acquire SCN from Bluepoint. The deal gave the Citytv system stations in all provinces west of Quebec and south of the federal territories of Northern Canada. The sale was approved in late June 2012 by the CRTC and Rogers relaunched SCN as Citytv Saskatchewan on July 1. Rogers plans to invest in the station's infrastructure, and also launch a high definition feed.

In Montreal, Rogers announced its intent to acquire multicultural station CJNT-DT from Toronto-based Channel Zero on May 3, 2012, and announced an affiliation agreement with the station, effective June 4, 2012. This gave Citytv stations in all provinces west of Atlantic Canada as well as the system's first television station located east of the Greater Toronto Area. On December 20, 2012, the CRTC approved the acquisition of CJNT and Rogers's request to convert the station from multicultural to a conventional English-language station. The station began carrying the full Citytv schedule on February 4, 2013, turning Citytv from a television system into a full-fledged network. Rogers will produce 15.5 hours of local programming a week for CJNT (including a local edition of Breakfast Television), and agreed to contribute funding and programming to a new independent multicultural station in Montreal.

== Programming ==
Old version of the Citytv logo. It was exclusively used in Toronto from 1982 to 2001.

Citytv is well known for its unconventional approach to news and local programming. There is no news desk (anchors read the news standing up, or on stools), and cameras are sometimes hand-held. Citytv also pioneered the concept of videojournalism, where reporters often carry their own camera report and videotape their own stories. Citytv calls its videojournalists "videographers", but unlike many stations in American television markets that try to conceal the fact that reporters are so-called "one-man bands", Citytv embraced the use of video journalism by highlighting the use of technology; Citytv videographers often carry a second home video camera to record images of them videotaping on the scene. The low-grade video is then incorporated into the story to show viewers how the story was recorded.

At one time, Citytv's Toronto flagship CITY-TV produced more local programs than any other television station in Canada, and more local programming than any other station in North America other than Boston's WCVB-TV. Citytv produced shows such as Speakers' Corner, CityLine and was the original home of FashionTelevision, SexTV and MediaTelevision. Many of these series were not exclusively focused on Toronto – FT, for instance, consisted largely of foreign runway footage – and are easily syndicated to other outlets. The latter three shows are now owned by CTVglobemedia as a result of its takeover of CHUM and subsequent divestiture of the Citytv stations.

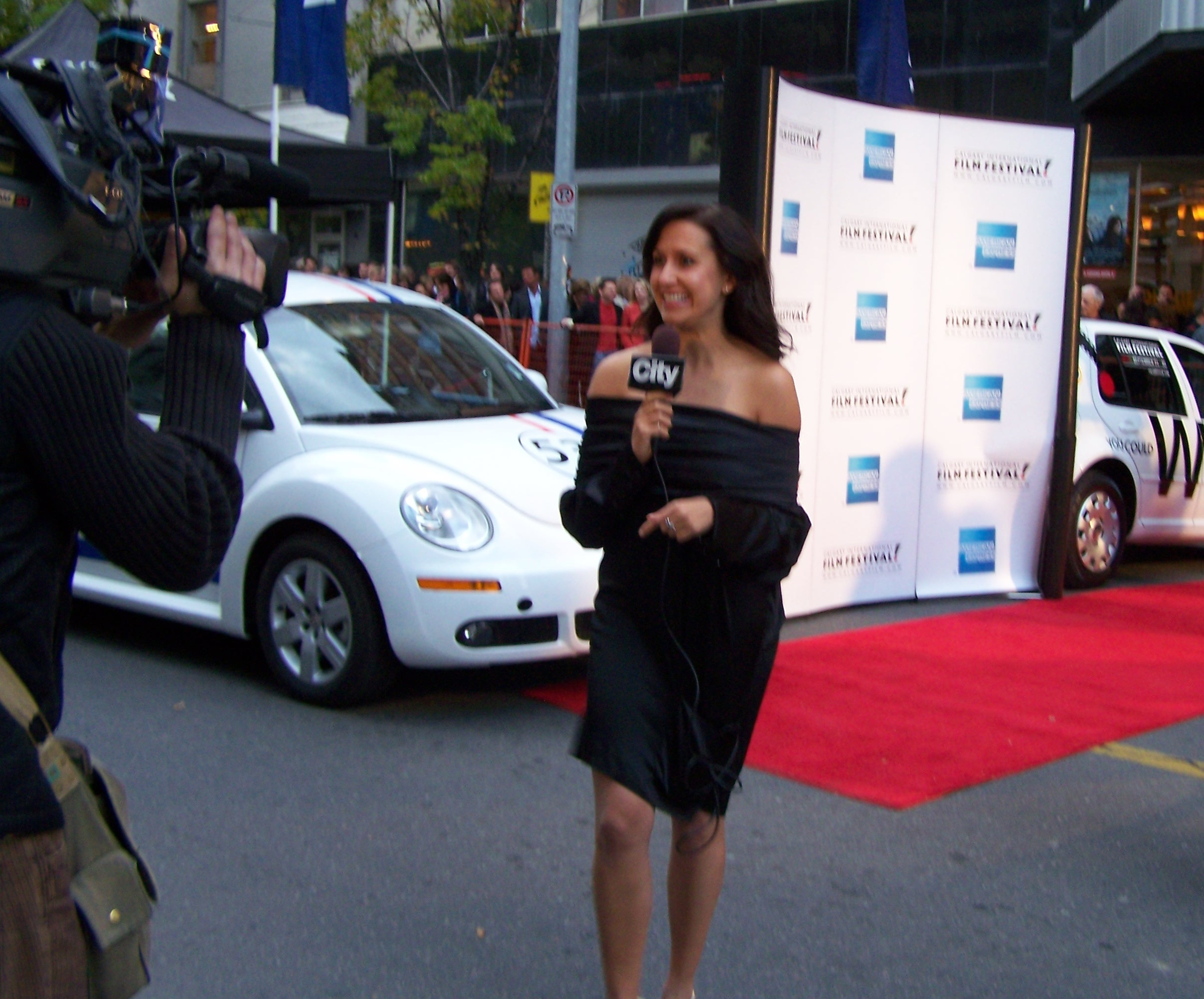
Jill Belland covering the 2007 Calgary International Film Festival for Citytv.

CITY prominently broadcast feature films during primetime, in late night and on weekends as part of the Great Movies block; as Citytv transitioned to a primetime lineup consisting of mainly domestic and American series during the 2000s, Great Movies was scaled back, then replaced in 2008 by reruns, reality shows and infomercials.

The station attracted attention and controversy by airing The Baby Blue Movie, a softcore pornography film showcase on Friday nights after midnight. Although this programming block was discontinued in the 1980s, it was reinstated on CITY and CKVU throughout most of the 2000s, until its ownership change to Rogers Communications. This, along with the 'hide away' place on the UHF dial formed the basis of fictional station "CIVIC TV" (Channel 83, Cable 12) in David Cronenberg's Videodrome, which is set in Toronto.

Citytv was one of the first television stations in Canada to implement a diversity policy in hiring its on-air staff, actively seeking out people of colour, people with disabilities, and other minority groups to work as on-air journalists. Znaimer described the policy as wanting the station to "look like Toronto".

Beginning in 1983, Citytv began to produce a New Year's Eve special live from Nathan Phillips Square in Downtown Toronto. Most recently known as the City New Year's Eve Bash, the yearly concert special expanded to include a second event in Calgary, Alberta for its 2012–13 edition. In 2013–14, Citytv began simulcasting ABC's Dick Clark's New Year's Rockin' Eve instead of airing its own full special, though it continued to sponsor (and air some coverage of) the New Year's event in Toronto.

=== News ===
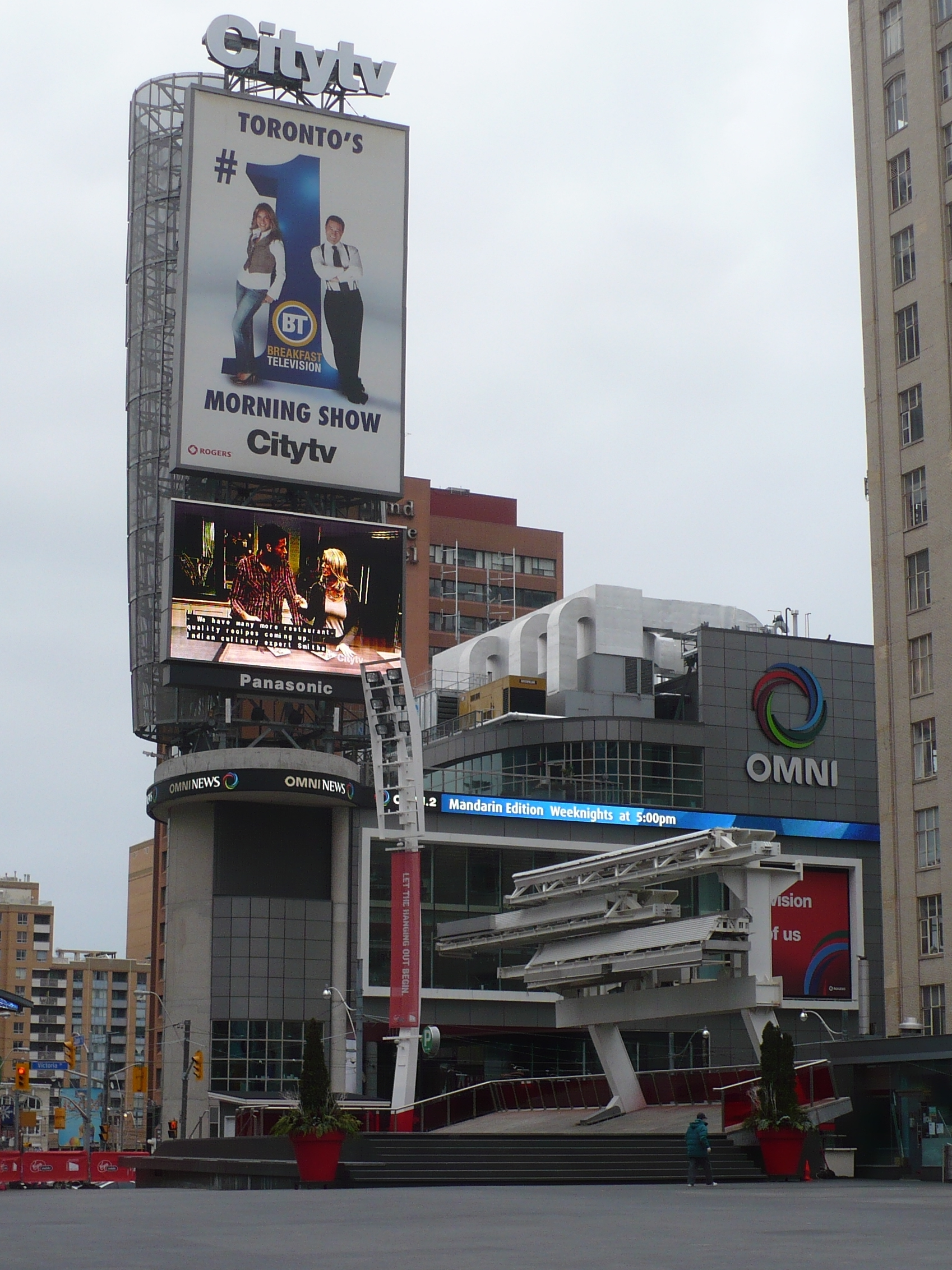
The CITY/OMNI building 33 Dundas Street East, Toronto

Citytv Toronto's CityNews, which used to be known as CityPulse, had developed a large following since its debut in 1977. Other stations around the world have imitated its format to varying degrees of success. However, Citytv itself was unsuccessful in expanding its audience to other Canadian markets, as evidenced by the eventual cancellation of the other stations' traditional newscasts. Flagship station CITY-DT, along with Jim Pattison Group-owned affiliates CFJC-TV, CKPG-TV and CHAT-TV are the only Citytv stations producing midday or evening newscasts. The Pattison stations use their individual callsigns, instead of branding under the Citytv name and do not use the CityNews title for their weekday newscasts. Four of City's five other owned-and-operated broadcast stations (CKVU-DT, CKAL-DT, CKEM-DT and CHMI-DT) only produce localized versions of the morning program franchise Breakfast Television. Citytv Saskatchewan, meanwhile, does not carry any local programming, and would be unable to broadcast Breakfast Television due to its mandate of airing educational programming in the morning and daytime hours.

Due to the structural problems facing the conventional television industry in Canada and the Great Recession, Rogers Media announced cost-cutting measures at the Citytv stations on January 19, 2010, which included massive layoffs and the cancellation of the following newscasts:

- CityNews at Noon in Calgary, Edmonton and Toronto
- Lunch Television in Vancouver
- Your City in Calgary and Edmonton, which was an evening replacement for previous CityNews programming that was cancelled in 2006.
- The satirical news program The CityNews List in Vancouver
- CityOnline, CityNews at Five and all weekend news programming in Toronto (the latter two were restored in 2011)
- City's national and international newscast, CityNews International

CITY-DT used to operate CP24, a cable news channel covering the Greater Toronto Area. During CTVglobemedia's purchase of CHUM Limited, the company chose to retain CP24, and the channel was re-aligned with CFTO (CTV). As a replacement, Rogers received approval for, and launched, CityNews Channel in October 2011. The network was modelled on Rogers-owned radio station CFTR 680, and featured news, weather, traffic reports, and other content drawing from the resources of Rogers properties such as Maclean's and Sportsnet. On May 30, 2013, as part of budget cuts, Rogers announced that the network would be shut down.

Citytv continued to produce Breakfast Television for all markets, and 6:00 p.m. and late-night CityNews Tonight in Toronto only (the evening newscasts in Toronto excluded weekend broadcasts until March 2011; the 5 p.m. newscast, meanwhile, would return in September 2011). 60 employees (including long-time Toronto news anchor Anne Mroczkowski) were laid off across Canada.

In 2015, Rogers cancelled the Winnipeg and Edmonton editions of Breakfast Television; in Winnipeg, it was replaced by a simulcast of the morning show from co-owned radio station CITI-FM, and the Edmonton edition was replaced by the spin-off Dinner Television, an evening newsmagazine and discussion program which did not feature original news reporting.

On June 5, 2017, Rogers announced that it would relaunch local CityNews evening newscasts across its stations, which would air at 6:00 and 11:00 p.m. nightly. The Edmonton and Winnipeg newscasts premiered on September 4, 2017, followed by Calgary, Montreal, and Vancouver on September 3, 2018.

=== Sports ===
==== National broadcasts ====
Between 2005 and 2014, the predominant sports property on Citytv was coverage of the National Football League. Craig Media (then-owners of the current Citytv stations in Winnipeg, Edmonton and Calgary) owned the rights to Monday Night Football in the early 2000s, and these rights moved to Citytv for MNF's final season on ABC in 2005, before being moved again to TSN in 2006. As such, Citytv broadcast Super Bowl XL in February 2006. Following the sale to Rogers, CKVU carried Sunday afternoon "late window" (4:00/4:15 p.m. ET, 1:00/1:15 p.m. PT) games during the 2007 season (as did Omni Television station CJMT in Toronto); CKVU had previously held the Vancouver rights to Monday Night Football from 1977 until 1997 and Sunday afternoon coverage from 1998 until 2001 by virtue of its Global affiliation, including the Super Bowl in 1985, 1988, 1991, 1995, 1999 and 2001. From the 2008 season through 2013, all Citytv stations carried Sunday late-window games. After rights to late games were acquired by CTV (who also airs early games), Sportsnet and Citytv maintained rights to Thursday Night Football and the afternoon American Thanksgiving games until the 2017 season, when these rights were acquired by TSN.

Under Rogers ownership, Citytv has aired occasional sports broadcasts as an overflow channel for co-owned Sportsnet, such as a 2014 FIFA World Cup qualification group-stage match between Canada and Panama on September 11, 2012, in simulcast with Sportsnet One. In 2012, it broadcast supplementary coverage of two tennis events that were primarily broadcast by the Sportsnet channels: the 2012 Rogers Cup, and the 2012 Davis Cup World Group Play-off between Canada and South Africa. During the 2019 NBA Finals (splitting with CTV and CTV2) and 2025 World Series involving the Toronto Raptors and Toronto Blue Jays, Citytv aired simulcasts of the ABC and Fox telecasts of the games for simsub reasons, alongside the Canadian broadcasts on Sportsnet.

In 2024, as part of an agreement with Woodbine Entertainment Group, Citytv acquired rights to the King's Plate—the first leg of the Canadian Triple Crown of Thoroughbred Racing, and the American triple crown (Kentucky Derby, Preakness Stakes, and Belmont Stakes). In October 2026, Citytv broadcast UFC 332 in simulcast with CBS as part of Sportsnet's rights to the mixed martial arts promotion.

On November 26, 2013, Rogers announced a 12-year, $5.2 billion deal to become the exclusive national rightsholder to the National Hockey League in the 2014–15 season. Beginning in October 2014, Citytv began to broadcast NHL games produced by Sportsnet as part of Hockey Night in Canada, and Rogers Hometown Hockey, a Sunday night game of the week hosted by Ron MacLean. Hometown Hockey moved from Citytv to Sportsnet for the 2015–16 season. Hockey Night in Canada ended on Sportsnet and Citytv in the 2026–27 NHL season after Rogers ended its sublicensing agreement with CBC Sports, and it was replaced by the Sportsnet-exclusive Saturday Night Hockey.

==== Local/regional broadcasts ====
- In addition to NFL regular-season games, CITY also aired some Buffalo Bills preseason games (including those held at the Rogers Centre).
- The Citytv stations in Alberta (while still branded "A-Channel") carried some regional NHL games during their first few years of operation. They occasionally carried regional broadcasts in the event of conflicts with other Sportsnet programming (Sportsnet West being the regional rightsholder to both the Edmonton Oilers and Calgary Flames) until December 2009. Similarly, CKVU Vancouver carried two regional Vancouver Canucks broadcasts during the 2009-10 season, again due to programming conflicts on Sportsnet Pacific. Sportsnet has since preferred the use of regional overflow feeds tied to the license of Sportsnet One for these purposes.
- CITY-TV Toronto broadcast some regular-season basketball games during the inaugural season of the Toronto Raptors.
- On March 2, 2008, CITY-TV aired its first baseball game, a Toronto Blue Jays spring training game, against the Cincinnati Reds. The Blue Jays, like City, are owned by Rogers.
- CKVU occasionally carried broadcasts of Major League Soccer's Vancouver Whitecaps FC as part of Sportsnet's regional broadcast deal with the team from 2010 to 2013.
- CJNT occasionally carried overflow broadcasts of the Montreal Canadiens as part of Sportsnet's regional broadcast deal with the team from 2014 through 2017.
- CKEM carried FC Edmonton games for a period.

== Citytv stations ==
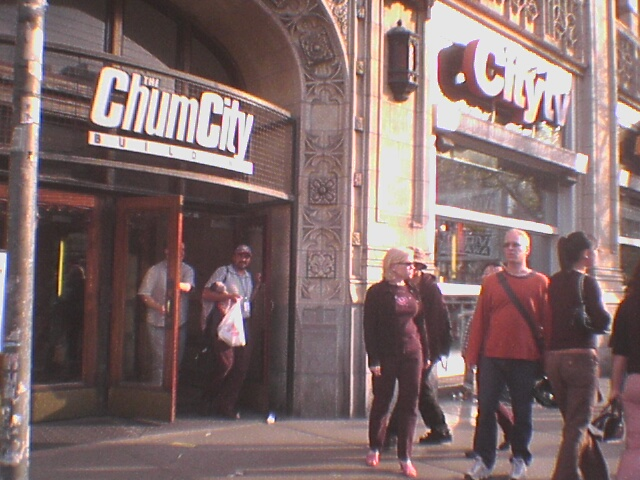
299 Queen Street West, the headquarters for Bell Media, formerly the home of Citytv Toronto. The CHUMCity and Citytv signs were removed after CTVglobemedia acquired control of CHUM Limited.

Individual stations are normally branded on-air as simply "Citytv" (from 2012 to 2018, the stations were referred to as "City"); the location may be added, for example "Citytv Toronto", if disambiguation is necessary. The list also mentions which stations had been owned by either CHUM Ltd. or Rogers, depending on affiliation.

Like most Canadian networks, Citytv stations are generally available as distant signals on most cable and satellite providers nationwide.

=== Owned-and-operated stations ===
City of license/market	Station	Channel TV (RF)	Year of affiliation	Owned since	Notes
Toronto, Ontario	CITY-DT	57.1 (18)	1972	1981	Original Citytv station, flagship
Calgary, Alberta	CKAL-DT	5.1 (20)	2005	2004	Former A-Channel station
Edmonton, Alberta	CKEM-DT	51.1 (17)	2005	2004	Former A-Channel flagship station
Montreal, Quebec	CJNT-DT	62.1 (17)	2012	2013	Former multicultural station as well as former CH/E! station
Portage la Prairie/Winnipeg, Manitoba	CHMI-DT	13.1 (13)	2005	2004	Former A-Channel station
Regina/Saskatoon, Saskatchewan	Citytv Saskatchewan	Cable-only	2012	2012	Licensed as an educational television service for the province of Saskatchewan, educational programming airs daily from 6 a.m.-3 p.m. CT.
Vancouver, British Columbia	CKVU-DT	10.1 (33)	2002	2001	Former Global station

=== Affiliates and international franchises ===
The Citytv brand has been licensed to local television stations in Bogotá, Colombia, and formerly in Barcelona, Spain. Toronto's CITY-DT is broadcast on a number of cable television providers in the Caribbean. In Barbados, Citytv is carried on channel 507 of the terrestrial subscription service known as Multi-Choice TV.

City of license/market	Station	Analog channel	Digital RF channel^{1}	Year of affiliation	Owner
Kamloops, British Columbia	CFJC-TV	4	43	2009	Jim Pattison Group
Prince George, British Columbia	CKPG-TV	2	34	2009	Jim Pattison Group
Bogotá, Colombia	Citytv Bogotá	21	27 DVBT2	1999	El Tiempo Casa Editorial

^{1} Italicized channel numbers indicate a digital channel allocated for future use by the Canadian Radio-television and Telecommunications Commission.

=== Former franchises ===
City of license	Station	Year of affiliation	Year of disaffiliation	Notes
Barcelona, Catalonia, Spain	Citytv Barcelona	2001	2006	Licence agreement expired in 2006, station was renamed TD8 and later 8TV. Ceased operations in October 2023.
Fajardo, Puerto Rico	WRUA-TV	2006	2007	Rogers Media discontinued the licensing for WRUA after it took over Citytv, and the station now serves as a translator for WECN in Naranjito. Was the first Citytv franchise in a United States territory.
Halifax/Atlantic Canada	ASN	1983	2008	Carried Citytv programming. Now known as CTV 2 Atlantic and owned by Bell Media.
Lloydminster, Alberta/Saskatchewan	CKSA-DT	2021	2025	The station was owned by Stingray Group and carried Citytv programming. It went off the air on May 13, 2025.
Medicine Hat, Alberta	CHAT-TV	2009	2025	The station was owned by Jim Pattison Group and carried Citytv programming. It went off the air on June 3, 2025.

== Citytv HD ==

In 2003, CHUM Limited launched a high definition simulcast of its Toronto station CITY-TV. In October 2006, Citytv installed a new control room, becoming one of the first fully HD broadcasters in Canada. On March 2, 2010, CKVU-TV in Vancouver launched its HD simulcast. CKEM-TV in Edmonton began testing its digital signal on May 26, 2010, and began regular HD broadcasts on June 29, 2010. CITY-DT-3 in Ottawa began testing its digital feed on June 12, 2010, and regular digital broadcasts on June 18, 2010. CKAL-TV began testing its high definition signal on August 31, 2010. By August 31, 2011, all Citytv owned-and-operated stations had their primary transmitters and most retransmitters broadcasting exclusively in digital.

Citytv HD is available nationally via satellite and on digital cable. It is also available for free over-the-air using a regular TV antenna and a digital tuner (included in most new television sets) via the following stations and retransmitters:

City	Station	OTA digital channel (virtual channel)
Calgary, Alberta	CKAL-DT	20 (5.1)
Edmonton, Alberta	CKEM-DT	17 (17.1)
Lethbridge, Alberta	CKAL-DT-1	29 (2.1)
Montreal, Quebec	CJNT-DT	17 (62.1)
Ottawa, Ontario	CITY-DT-3	17 (65.1)
Toronto, Ontario	CITY-DT	18 (57.1)
Vancouver, British Columbia	CKVU-DT	33 (10.1)
Victoria, British Columbia	CKVU-DT-2	27 (27.1)
Winnipeg, Manitoba	CHMI-DT	13 (13.1)
Woodstock, Ontario	CITY-DT-2	31 (31.1)

== Video on demand and streaming ==
Video on demand access to Citytv programming has been available in various forms, such as through TV provider's set-top boxes, or streaming media through the network's website and mobile apps.

=== CitytvNow ===
In June 2018, Rogers announced it would launch an expanded service called Citytv Now (stylized Citytv NOW) for authenticated customers of partnered TV service providers, such as corporate sibling Rogers Cable. Citytv Now features fulls-season (and several past season) availability of shows airing on Citytv. For a time, the service also featured exclusive programs not airing on the broadcast network.

=== Citytv+ ===
Citytv+ logo

On April 12, 2022, Rogers announced the launch of Citytv+ (pronounced Citytv Plus), an add-on channel for Amazon's Prime Video. The service includes most of the programming available on Citytv and its siblings, including Omni Television, as well as recent and selected past programming aired by the Canadian FX and FXX networks. The service succeeds Shomi, a joint venture between Rogers Communications and the now-defunct Shaw Media prior to the latter's merger with Corus Entertainment; and has been compared to the latter company's StackTV service. Bravo was added following its relaunch under Rogers in September 2024.

Live linear feeds of most Citytv stations, as well as CityNews 24/7, also became available to Amazon Prime subscribers at no additional cost through Prime Video. CityNews 24/7 is a headline news channel, similar to those offered online by Global News, and an indirect successor to the CityNews Channel (which operated from 2011 to 2013, following the separation of Citytv and CP24 in 2009).

On January 1, 2025, Rogers's authenticated streaming platform was relaunched under the Citytv+ name, replacing the separate websites and mobile apps for Citytv and FX/FXX. Access to Rogers's newly-launched Warner Bros. Discovery-branded channels was added to both this platform and the Prime Video add-on at this time.

== In popular culture ==
- In the 1983 film Videodrome, a television station in Toronto which broadcasts sensationalistic programming is named CIVIC-TV; the name is in reference to flagship station CITY-TV. Additionally, a business partner of the station president in the film is named Moses, a possible reference to Citytv cofounder Moses Znaimer.

== See also ==
- 2007 Canada broadcast TV realignment
- USA Broadcasting (which attempted a Citytv-inspired format dubbed "CityVision" on four of its owned stations from 1998 to 2001)
