= CJHD-FM =

Coordinates: 52°48′15″N 108°35′21″W

- North Battleford, Saskatchewan; Canada
- Frequency: 93.3 MHz
- Branding: 93.3 Beach Radio

Programming
- Format: Classic hits

Ownership
- Owner: Jim Pattison Group
- Sister stations: CJNB and CJCQ-FM

History
- First air date: 2004

Technical information
- Class: C1
- ERP: 100 kW
- HAAT: 199.1 metres (653 ft)

Links
- Webcast: Listen Live
- Website: 933beachradio.ca

CJHD-FM is a Canadian radio station that broadcasts a classic hits format, branded as 93.3 Beach Radio at 93.3 FM in North Battleford, Saskatchewan, Canada. Its local sister stations are CJNB and CJCQ-FM. All three are located at 1711 100th Street in North Battleford.

The station is owned by the Jim Pattison Group, and was licensed in 2004.
