= Choices Markets =

Grocer in British Columbia, Canada

- Type: Private
- Industry: Grocery store
- Founded: 1990; 36 years ago
- Founders: Lloyd Lockhart; Wayne Lockhart
- Headquarters: Delta, British Columbia
- Number of locations: 11 (Note: As of December 2017)
- Areas served: Greater Vancouver; Kelowna; Parksville
- Key people: Dan Bregg (president)
- Products: Food; Organic food
- Parent: Buy-Low Foods LP
- Website: www.choicesmarkets.com

Choices Markets is a grocer based in British Columbia, Canada, that is focused on natural, specialty and organic food.

== Overview ==
The chain has eleven stores: eight in Metro Vancouver, which includes one in the Fraser Valley. The ninth location is in Kelowna. Choices Markets opened its 10th location, North Vancouver, in the second quarter of 2016, and eleventh in Parksville. Choices was founded in December 1990 by brothers Wayne and Lloyd Lockhart. The original store is located in Kitsilano on West 16th avenue. The owners emphasize that the store caters to a range of diets, including gluten free, vegetarian and vegan. Lockhart cites this is a guiding principle for the chain: "It's all about providing choice."

The company has relied on various techniques aimed at increasing customer loyalty in order to compete with larger chains in the area, such as providing customers with the Choices preferred shopper card, which allows customers to receive discounts on specially labelled products and accumulate points when they shop, providing an in-house nutritionist to help advise customers and worked to build energy and "theatre" in stores through product demos, food festivals and farmer/shopper interaction.

The Canadian Federation of Independent Grocers inducted Choices Markets White Rock (in South Surrey, British Columbia) into their Hall of Fame in 2015. To be eligible for Hall of Fame induction, a store must win at least three Gold Awards or receive one Platinum Achievement Award and one Gold Award.

Choices Markets was sold to the Buy-Low Foods Group on December 3, 2017. The previous Choices ownership decided to retire and selected an owner they believed would retain what the Choices brand stands for while remaining locally owned and operated.

Choices Markets was selected as the Fairtrade Canada Retailer of the Year in February 2018. They have won this award 5 of the past 6 years.

== See also ==
- List of Canadian supermarkets
