= British Columbia Magazine =

Canadian geographic and travel magazine

- Editor: Dale Miller
- Categories: Regional magazine
- Frequency: Quarterly
- Founder: Clyde Herrington
- Founded: 1959
- Company: OP Media Group
- Country: Canada
- Based in: Vancouver, British Columbia
- Language: English
- Website: www.bcmag.ca
- ISSN: 1709-4623

British Columbia Magazine is a geographic and travel magazine in British Columbia. Its coverage includes travel, outdoor recreation, geography, wildlife, conservation, people, science and natural phenomena, First Nations culture, heritage places, and history within the province, with a tradition of extensive use of photography. Founded in 1959 as Beautiful British Columbia magazine, the publication is currently owned by OP Media Group.

== History ==
In 1959, founding editor Clyde Herrington pitched the idea of an all-colour British Columbia travel publication to the B.C. provincial government. The first issue, titled Beautiful British Columbia: Land of New Horizons, appeared that year at a time when B.C. was little known outside of Canada.

The magazine used full-colour, large-format layout and high photographic content techniques that were relatively uncommon at the time. The cover line on the summer 1959 launch issue proclaimed, "48 pages of sparkling colour". The magazine reflected a new era of expansionism in the province, heralding major new highway construction and the launch of a government-run ferry fleet (BC Ferries) that would alter travel within B.C.

In the early 1960s, sales increased dramatically as residents began to send Beautiful British Columbia Magazine subscriptions to friends and relatives across Canada and around the world. The quarterly magazine, now incorporating an annual scenic calendar, soon developed one of the largest circulations in Canada according to the national Print Measurement Bureau (PMB).

Over the next 20 years, the magazine played a major role in the development of British Columbia's tourism industry. During this period, with a field almost to itself, the magazine published many B.C. gift and travel books.

In 1983, as part of a provincial government privatization program, the magazine was sold to the Jim Pattison Group. The now-independent magazine evolved from a tourism publication into an environmentally conscious geographic and travel quarterly. A new title, Beautiful British Columbia: Ours to Cherish, mirrored the new editorial mandate, and the magazine began to win the first of dozens of regional and international awards for its articles, design, photography, and printing quality.

In 2001, Tourism British Columbia acquired the magazine from the Jim Pattison Group. With the Fall 2002 issue, the magazine's title was changed to British Columbia Magazine. The publication currently has a paid circulation of more than 120,000, holding its place as one of the largest paid circulation magazines in Canada.

In 2014, British Columbia Magazine was acquired by My Passion Media Inc. publisher Brad Liski and later sold to OP Media Group in 2017.

== Similar earlier publications ==
An earlier periodical, British Columbia Magazine, bore the alternate title Westward Ho!. Published monthly in Vancouver, British Columbia from July 1907 to January 1915, it ceased publication in the First World War and never resumed. Westminster Hall Magazine began its publication in June 1911 and later on changed its title to Westminster Hall Magazine and Farthest West Review with its December 1912 issue. Appearing as the Westminster Review from November 1915 to December 1917, it was published as British Columbia Monthly: The Magazine of the Canadian West from January 1918 until its last number was produced in December 1927.
