= CJCQ-FM =

Radio station in North Battleford, Saskatchewan

Coordinates: 52°48′15″N 108°35′21″W

- North Battleford, Saskatchewan; Canada
- Frequency: 97.9 MHz
- Branding: Q98

Programming
- Format: Hot adult contemporary

Ownership
- Owner: Jim Pattison Group
- Sister stations: CJNB, CJHD-FM

History
- First air date: September 26, 2001

Technical information
- Class: C1
- ERP: 100,000 watts
- HAAT: 199.1 metres (653 ft)

Links
- Webcast: Listen Live
- Website: q98.ca

CJCQ-FM is a Canadian radio station that broadcasts a hot adult contemporary format at 97.9 FM in North Battleford, Saskatchewan branded as Q98. Its local sister stations are CJNB and CJHD-FM. All three are located at 1711 100th Street in North Battleford.

Owned by the Jim Pattison Group, the station signed on in 2001.

CJCQ also has a rebroadcaster operating in Meadow Lake at 104.5 FM with the callsign CJCQ-FM-1.
