= Jim Pattison Group =

Canadian business conglomerate

The Jim Pattison Group
- Type: Private
- Industry: Media, automotive, packaging, food sales and distribution, magazine distribution, entertainment, export and financial industries
- Founded: 1961; 65 years ago, in Vancouver, British Columbia
- Headquarters: Rogers Tower, Vancouver, British Columbia, Canada
- Area served: Canada; United States; Mexico; Europe; Asia; Australia
- Key people: Jim Pattison (chairman and CEO); Ryan Barrington-Foote (president and COO)
- Products: Media, Broadcasting, Grocery, Billboards
- Revenue: $10.9 billion (2020)
- Owner: Jim Pattison
- Number of employees: 48,000 (2020)
- Divisions: See § Divisions
- Website: jimpattison.com

The Jim Pattison Group is a Canadian conglomerate based in Vancouver. Jim Pattison, a Vancouver-based entrepreneur, is the chairman, CEO, and sole owner of the company. The Jim Pattison Group, Canada's second largest privately held company, has more than 45,000 employees worldwide, and annual sales of $10.1 billion based on investments in Canada, the U.S., Mexico, Europe, Asia and Australia. The Group is active in 25 divisions, according to Forbes, including packaging, food, forestry products.

In early 2022, the 93-year-old Pattison was still working full-time. According to Forbes, his net worth then was $5.7 billion, having increased substantially from the $2.1 billion reported in March 2009. In September 2020, a news item stated that "Jim Pattison Group Inc. had $10.9 billion in revenue and employed 48,000 people".

== History ==
The Jim Pattison Group was created on May 8, 1961, when Pattison purchased a General Motors automobile dealership by borrowing $40,000 from the Royal Bank of Canada, and placing his home and life insurance policy with the bank as collateral.

In 1965, The Jim Pattison Group was awarded a licence to operate Vancouver AM radio station CJOR. The group then acquired Neon Products (Vancouver) & Seaboard Outdoor Advertising in 1967, Overwaitea Foods (Vancouver) in 1968, and Provincial News (Edmonton) in 1969. The real estate arm of the group was created in 1980. The Jim Pattison Group acquired British Columbia Magazine, Canadian Fishing Company in 1984, and Ripley's Believe It or Not! in 1985.

In 1990, the group acquired Foodservice Packaging Group, Flexible Packaging Group, and Coroplast and Montebello Packaging. The following year, the group launched its financial services division. The Jim Pattison Group acquired Westshore Terminals (B.C.-based coal-export terminal facility) in 1994, Buy-Low Foods in 1995, and launched Select Media Services. In 1999, the group acquired Cooper's Foods.

The Ripley's Aquarium opened in Myrtle Beach, SC, and Ripley's Aquarium of The Smokies, Gatlinburg, TN opened in 2000. In 2001, the group acquired Monarch Broadcasting and Van-Whole Produce, and started ProLogix Distribution Services and AccuLogix Distribution Services the following year. Ever Corp. was acquired in 2002 and LIN PAC Inc. in 2003. In 2004, the Jim Pattison Group acquired Classic Attractions (Texas), St. Augustine Sightseeing Trains (Florida), Maltese Signs (Norcross, GA), the auto lease business of Cross-Canada Car Leasing Limited (Toronto, ON), and the periodical distribution companies in San Jose and Chico, CA.

As of April 2020, the group was headquartered in the Shaw Tower in Vancouver. The Shaw Tower was later renamed to the Rogers Tower in May 2023, after Shaw Communications merged into Rogers Communications.

- 2005 – Acquired control of Icicle Seafoods (BC.) Inc.
  - Acquired Freeway Dodge Chrysler
  - Acquired Spartech Corporation's corrugated plastic sheet business
  - Started the Vancouver edition of 24 Hours (in partnership with Quebecor Media)
  - Formed or purchased interests in several US and Canadian joint ventures in the periodical industry
  - Employees: 28,000 Sales: $6.1 billion
- 2006 – Acquired Carthage Cup, Carthage, TX
  - Acquired Creative Outdoor Ads, Halifax, Nova Scotia
  - Acquired Island Radio Ltd.'s six FM stations on Vancouver Island
  - Acquired OK Radio Group Ltd.'s two FM stations in Victoria, BC
  - Acquired A&W Fixtures, Cocoa, Florida
  - Started Great Pacific Bank Limited, Warrens, Barbados
- 2007 – Disposed of interest in the Vancouver 24 Hours
- 2008 – Acquired Guinness World Records from HIT Entertainment
- 2009 – Funded the Peak Performance Project
- 2010 – Acquired Amc Billboard Co
- 2011 – Acquired Ocean Brands

October 29, 2013, Pattison became an insider of the Just Energy Group, a publicly traded corporation on both the Toronto Stock Exchange and the American Stock Exchange, by taking possession of more than 14 million shares (over 10% of the company's shares outstanding).

- 2013 – Acquired Sun-Rype
- 2014 – Purchased 5 John Deere Dealerships in Saskatchewan.
- 2015 – Employees: 39,000 Sales: $8.2 billion
- 2015 – Purchased Peterbilt Pacific Dealerships
- 2017 – Amalgamated JayDee AGTECH and Maple Farm Equipment John Deere Dealerships as one company, Pattison Agriculture with 17 locations across Saskatchewan and Manitoba
- 2017 – Took controlling interest (March 23, 2017) of Quality Foods with 13 locations across Vancouver Island, British Columbia
- 2017 – Acquired Choices Markets from the Lockhart family to be operated as a division of Buy-Low Foods LP
- 2019 – Sold Sun-Rype to Lassonde Industries for C$80 million in an all-cash deal. As well, in announcing the sale, it was reported that Sun-Rype had C$164 million in gross sales for their fiscal year ended September 30, 2019, and C$9 million in EBITDA.
- 2020 – acquired remaining magazine and book distribution business not previously held in Canada from Metro360 for $925,000. The News Group is the only major distributor of periodicals in Canada.
- 2024 - acquired Northern California-based grocer Save Mart Companies which includes Save Mart, Lucky, and FoodMaxx stores; Yosemite Wholesale; and the office division of Save Mart.
- 2026 - on January 21, 2026, the US Department of Homeland Security announced it would purchase a warehouse in Hanover County, Virginia owned by the Jim Pattison Group for use as a potential "holding and processing" facility. After significant public outcry, on January 30th the Jim Pattison Group stated it would no longer be proceeding with the sale.

== Divisions ==
Some of the more significant divisions of the Jim Pattison Group include:

=== Illuminated Signs ===
- Pattison Sign Group

=== Pattison Food Group ===
- The Overwaitea Food Group
  - Bulkley Valley Wholesale
  - Coopers Foods
  - Everything Wine
  - More Rewards
  - PriceSmart Foods
  - Save-On-Foods
  - Urban Fare
- Buy-Low Foods LP
  - Choices Markets
  - Nesters Markets
  - Meinhardt Fine Foods
  - Nature’s Fare
- Canadian Fishing Company
- Quality Foods
- Roth's Fresh Markets
- Save Mart Supermarkets
  - FoodMaxx
  - Lucky California

=== Pattison Media ===
==== Television stations ====
- Kamloops, British Columbia – CFJC-TV, Citytv affiliate
- Prince George, British Columbia – CKPG-TV, Citytv affiliate

==== Radio stations ====
- Brandon, Manitoba - CKLF-FM, CKLQ-FM,
- Calgary, Alberta – CKWD-FM, CKCE-FM
- Chilliwack, British Columbia – CHWK-FM
- Courtenay/Comox/Campbell River, British Columbia – CKLR-FM
- Cranbrook, British Columbia – CHBZ-FM, CHDR-FM
- Drayton Valley/Rocky Mountain House, Alberta – CIBW-FM, CHBW-FM
- Edmonton, Alberta – CIUP-FM, CKNO-FM
- Fernie, British Columbia – CJDR-FM
- Grande Prairie, Alberta – CJXX-FM, CIKT-FM
- Kamloops, British Columbia – CKBZ-FM, CIFM-FM
- Kelowna, British Columbia – CKQQ-FM, CKLZ-FM, CKOV-FM
- Lethbridge, Alberta – CHLB-FM, CJBZ-FM
- Meadow Lake, Saskatchewan – CJNS-FM
- Medicine Hat, Alberta – CHAT-FM, CFMY-FM
- Melfort, Saskatchewan – CJVR-FM, CKJH
- Merritt, British Columbia – CKMQ-FM
- Nanaimo, British Columbia – CHWF-FM, CKWV-FM
- North Battleford, Saskatchewan – CJNB, CJCQ-FM, CJHD-FM
- Parksville/Qualicum Beach, British Columbia – CHPQ-FM, CIBH-FM
- Port Alberni, British Columbia – CJAV-FM
- Prince Albert, Saskatchewan – CFMM-FM, CHQX-FM, CKBI
- Prince George, British Columbia – CKDV-FM, CKKN-FM
- Red Deer, Alberta – CHUB-FM, CFDV-FM
- Vancouver, British Columbia – CJJR-FM, CKPK-FM
- Vernon, British Columbia – CJIB-FM
- Victoria, British Columbia – CJZN-FM, CKKQ-FM
- Whitecourt, Alberta – CIXM-FM
- Winnipeg, Manitoba – CHNW-FM, CFQX-FM

==== Other media properties ====
- Pattison Outdoor Advertising – the largest domestic Out-of-Home advertising company in Canada, with a 41% market share of all traditional out-of-home advertising displays

=== Periodical Distribution ===
- The News Group, North America's largest newspaper and magazine distributor; in November 2018, the company agreed to sell this group, and its entire United States magazine distribution business to American News Company, LLC. The Canadian periodicals division of The News Group, as well as the Non-Periodical's portion of The News Group remains a division of the Jim Pattison Group.
- Select Media Services

=== Entertainment ===
- Ripley Entertainment – Owners of the Ripley's Believe It or Not! franchise
- Guinness World Records

=== Automotive Group ===
==== The Jim Pattison Auto Group ====
===== Dealerships =====
- Jim Pattison Audi
  - Audi Edmonton North
- Jim Pattison Chrysler, Jeep, Dodge, Ram, and ProMaster
  - Jim Pattison Chrysler Jeep Dodge Surrey
- Jim Pattison Hyundai
  - Jim Pattison Hyundai Coquitlam
  - Jim Pattison Hyundai Northshore
  - Jim Pattison Hyundai Surrey
- Jim Pattison Lexus
  - Jim Pattison Lexus Northshore
  - Jim Pattison Lexus Victoria
- Jim Pattison Subaru
  - Jim Pattison Subaru Coquitlam
  - Jim Pattison Subaru Northshore
  - Jim Pattison Subaru Victoria
  - Jim Pattison Subaru on Regent
  - Jim Pattison Subaru South
- Jim Pattison Toyota
  - Jim Pattison Toyota Downtown
  - Jim Pattison Toyota Northshore
  - Jim Pattison Toyota Surrey
  - Jim Pattison Toyota Victoria
  - Jim Pattison Toyota Duncan
  - Jim Pattison Toyota on Regent
  - Canyon Creek Toyota Calgary
- Jim Pattison Volkswagen
  - Jim Pattison Volkswagen Surrey
- Jim Pattison Volvo
  - Jim Pattison Volvo of North Vancouver
  - Jim Pattison Volvo of Surrey
- Jim Pattison Acura
  - Campus Acura Victoria
- Jim Pattison Honda
  - Campus Honda Victoria
- Jim Pattison Infiniti
  - Campus Infiniti Victoria
- Jim Pattison Nissan
  - Campus Nissan Victoria
- Campus Auto Group
- North Surrey Auto Mall

==== Body Shops ====
- Jim Pattison Auto Body & Glass Surrey
- Jim Pattison Toyota Surrey Auto Body & Glass
- Jim Pattison Collision & Glass

==== Jim Pattison Lease ====
- Canada's largest privately owned fleet management and leasing company.

=== The Jim Pattison Packaging Group ===
- GenPak – independent supplier of disposable food service packaging in the US and Canada.
- Coroplast – manufacturer and marketer of corrugated plastic sheet for the graphics and re-usable packaging industries
- Montebello Packaging – manufacturer of collapsible aluminum and laminate tubes, marker tubes, and rigid aluminum aerosol cans

=== Export and Financial Services ===
- Westshore Terminals – Canadian coal export facility and the largest dry bulk terminal on the West Coast of the Americas

=== Agriculture ===
- Pattison Agriculture
