= CFMY-FM =

Radio station in Medicine Hat

- Medicine Hat, Alberta; Canada
- Frequency: 96.1 MHz
- Branding: My96

Programming
- Format: Adult contemporary

Ownership
- Owner: Jim Pattison Group
- Sister stations: CHAT-FM

History
- First air date: 1982
- Former call signs: 1390 kHz (1982–1998)

Technical information
- Licensing authority: CRTC
- Class: C1
- ERP: 100,000 watts
- HAAT: 176.5 meters (579 ft)
- Transmitter coordinates: 50.075°N 110.755°W

Links
- Website: www.my96fm.com

CFMY-FM (96.1 MHz) is a radio station in Medicine Hat, Alberta, Canada. Owned by the Jim Pattison Group, the station broadcasts a hot adult contemporary format.

== History ==
The station originally began broadcasting as CJCY on AM 1390 kHz in 1982, until it moved to its current frequency in 1998.
