= CJBZ-FM =

Radio station in Lethbridge

Coordinates: 49°41′09″N 112°20′51″W

- Lethbridge, Alberta; Canada
- Broadcast area: Lethbridge County
- Frequency: 93.3 MHz
- Branding: B-93

Programming
- Format: Hot adult contemporary

Ownership
- Owner: Jim Pattison Group
- Sister stations: CHLB-FM

History
- First air date: October 7, 1974
- Former call signs: CKTA (1974–1987, 1993–2000); CFEZ (1987–1993); CHHK (2000–2004)
- Former frequencies: 1570 kHz (1974–2000)

Technical information
- Class: C1
- ERP: 50,000 watts average; 100,000 watts peak
- HAAT: 174 metres (571 ft)

Links
- Webcast: Listen Live
- Website: b93.fm

CJBZ-FM (93.3 MHz) is a radio station broadcasting a hot adult contemporary format. Licensed to Lethbridge, Alberta, Canada, it serves the Taber/Lethbridge region. The station is currently owned by the Jim Pattison Group.

The station originally began broadcasting in 1974 as CKTA which operated at 1570 AM, until the station moved to its current frequency 93.3 FM in 2000 as classic rocker CHHK. In 2004 it shifted to adult hits and adopted its current branding and callsign and later to CHR/Top 40 in 2007. CJBZ has since shifted to a hot adult contemporary format.

CJBZ airs American Top 40 with Ryan Seacrest on Saturday evenings at 6 PM and on Sunday mornings at 9 AM.
