= CHAT-FM =

Radio station in Medicine Hat

- Medicine Hat, Alberta; Canada
- Frequency: 94.5 MHz
- Branding: Wild 94.5

Programming
- Format: Country
- Affiliations: Medicine Hat Tigers

Ownership
- Owner: Jim Pattison Group
- Sister stations: CFMY-FM

History
- First air date: November 1, 1946
- Former frequencies: 1270 kHz (1946–2006)
- Call sign meaning: "Hat" for Medicine Hat

Technical information
- Licensing authority: CRTC
- Class: C1
- ERP: 100,000 watts
- HAAT: 175.8 metres (577 ft)
- Transmitter coordinates: 50.076°N 110.755°W

Links
- Website: www.wild945.ca

CHAT-FM (94.5 MHz) is a radio station in Medicine Hat, Alberta, Canada. Owned by the Jim Pattison Group, the station broadcasts a country format.

== History ==
The station originally began broadcasting as an AM station on November 1, 1946, at 1270 kHz, where it remained until the station moved to 94.5 FM in 2006. It was a network affiliate of CBC Radio's Dominion Network until 1962 when the network dissolved. It then became an affiliate of the main CBC Radio network and remained so until 1994 when CBC built a repeater of CBR for the Medicine Hat area.

In October 2022, the station rebranded as Wild 94.5, taking its name from Calgary sister station CKWD-FM.

The current programming line-up consists of Mornings with Jesse and Lance, Midday's with Kim Johnston, Afternoons with Addison Petrie, and Evenings with Justin Hartman.

== Notable people ==
Jurgen Gothe, who later became a prominent national broadcaster on CBC Radio 2, got his start as an advertising copywriter for the station. Doug McArthur, accomplished news broadcaster, was a linchpin of the radio news department throughout the 1980s.
