= List of radio stations in Saskatchewan =

The following is a list of radio stations in the Canadian province of Saskatchewan, as of 2024.

Call sign	Frequency	City of Licence	Owner	Format
CKRE-FM	104.9 FM	Ahtahkakoop First Nation	Larry Ahenakew	community radio
CKHD-FM	98.1 FM	Assiniboia	Huber Radio, Ltd.	Classic hits
VF2280	88.1 FM	Athabasca Hydro Station	Saskatchewan Power Corporation	
VF2332	97.3 FM	Beardys First Nation	Natotawin Broadcasting	First Nations community radio
CIPI-FM	96.5 FM	Beauval	Sipisishk Communications	First Nations community radio
CBKB-FM	101.5 FM	Beauval	CBC Radio One	public news/talk
CBKF-FM-4	91.9 FM	Bellegarde	Ici Radio-Canada Première	public news/talk (French)
VF2389	92.7 FM	Big Island Lake	Peewey Corporation	
CKBI-FM-1	92.5 FM	Big River	Jim Pattison Group	country
CHQX-FM-3	97.5 FM	Big River	Jim Pattison Group	active rock
CIWF-FM	95.7 FM	Big River Reserve	MBC Radio	First Nations community radio
CJBL-FM	91.7 FM	Black Lake Reserve	MBC Radio	First Nations community radio
CHII-FM	88.9 FM	Brabant Lake	MBC Radio	First Nations community radio
CIAM-FM-10	100.1 FM	Buckland	CIAM Media & Radio Broadcasting Association	Christian radio
CIBN-FM	89.3 FM	Buffalo Narrows	MBC Radio	First nations community radio
CBKD-FM	103.5 FM	Buffalo Narrows	CBC Radio One	public news/talk
CFCK-FM	103.9 FM	Canoe Lake	MBC Radio	First Nations community radio
CIDD-FM	97.7 FM	Carlyle Lake	White Bear Children's Charity	community radio
CISE-FM-1	95.3 FM	Caron	Kenneth Clarke Odland	tourist information community radio
CJVR-FM-3	99.7 FM	Carrot River	Jim Pattison Group	
VF2212	101.1 FM	Carrot River	CJNE-FM Rebroadcast	community radio, classic rock
CFSW-FM	103.1 FM	Chaplin	C.W. Millar	tourist information
CIAM-FM-29	100.9 FM	Corman Park	CARE Radio Broadcasting Association	Christian radio
CIBC-FM	98.1 FM	Cowesses	Cowessess Community Projects Inc.	First Nations community radio
CBKA-FM-1	93.3 FM	Creighton	CBC Radio One	public news/talk
CJCF-FM	89.9 FM	Cumberland House	MBC Radio	First nations community radio
CBKV-FM	94.9 FM	Cumberland House	CBC Radio One	public news/talk
CHRS-FM	97.5 FM	Cumberland House	Cumberland House Cree Nation	First Nations community radio
CHHP-FM	103.7 FM	Cypress Hills Provincial Park	Brad Mason	tourist information
CJVR-FM-1	100.3 FM	Dafoe	Jim Pattison Group	country
CJLR-FM-2	91.9 FM	Denare Beach	MBC Radio	First nations community radio
CBKO-FM	94.3 FM	Denare Beach	CBC Radio One	public news/talk
CKBR-FM	92.7 FM	Dillon	MBC Radio	First Nations community radio
VF2367	97.7 FM	Dillon	Dene Development Corporation	First Nations community radio
CJEZ-FM	99.5 FM	Esterhazy	5777152 Manitoba Ltd.	community radio (new - launch date to be announced)
CJSL	1150 AM	Estevan	Golden West Broadcasting	classic hits
VF2393	92.3 FM	Estevan	Corey Arthur Lascelle	tourist information
CHSN-FM	102.3 FM	Estevan	Golden West Broadcasting	adult contemporary
CKSE-FM	106.1 FM	Estevan	Golden West Broadcasting	country
CFBA-FM	99.1 FM	Foam Lake	Shelley Thoen-Chaykoski	tourist information
VF2299	89.9 FM	Fond-du-Lac	MBC Radio	First Nations community radio
CBKG-FM	100.1 FM	Fond-du-Lac	CBC Radio One	public news/talk
CBKF-1	690 AM	Gravelbourg	Ici Radio-Canada Première	public news/talk (French, formerly CFRG)
CFRG-FM	93.1 FM	Gravelbourg	Association communautaire fransaskoise de Gravelbourg	community radio (French)
CJME-2-FM	107.1 FM	Gravelbourg	Rawlco Radio	news/talk
CHGL-FM	94.9 FM	Green Lake	Green Lake Radio and Television Broadcasting Society	First Nations community radio
VF2500	101.1 FM	Hepburn	Brenda Reimer	
CFMQ-FM	98.1 FM	Hudson Bay	HB Communications	community radio / CJVR Rebroadcast
CHBO-FM	107.5 FM	Humboldt	Golden West Broadcasting	adult hits
CILX-FM	92.5 FM	Île-à-la-Crosse	MBC Radio	First Nations community radio
VF2349	97.5 FM	Île-à-la-Crosse	Île-à-la-Crosse Communication Society	community radio
CBKC-FM	105.1 FM	Île-à-la-Crosse	CBC Radio One	public news/talk
CBKN-FM	105.1 FM	Island Falls	CBC Radio One	public news/talk
VF2449	105.3 FM	Island Lake	Harvey Chief	First Nations community radio
CIFN-FM	106.5 FM	Island Lake	Island Lake First Nations Radio Inc.	First Nations community radio
VF2300	96.5 FM	James Smith Reserve	Natotawin Broadcasting	First Nations community radio
CJBW	1330 AM	Jans Bay	Jans Bay Broadcasting	First Nations community radio
VF2400	97.5 FM	Keeseekoose First Nation	Keeseekoose First Nation	First Nations community radio
CFYM	1210 AM	Kindersley	Golden West Broadcasting	classic hits
CKVX-FM	104.9 FM	Kindersley	Golden West Broadcasting	country
CBKE-FM	95.5 FM	La Loche	CBC Radio One	public news/talk
VF2121	97.1 FM	Lampman	Town of Lampman	
CJLR-FM	89.9 FM	La Ronge	MBC Radio	First Nations community radio
VF2001	92.9 FM	La Ronge	Cable Ronge	classic rock
CKBI-FM	95.9 FM	La Ronge	Jim Pattison Group	country
CHQX-FM-2	98.3 FM	La Ronge	Jim Pattison Group	active rock
VF2376	101.1 FM	La Ronge	Cable Ronge	classic rock
CBKA-FM	105.9 FM	La Ronge	CBC Radio One	public news/talk
CKSA-FM	95.9 FM	Lloydminster*	Stingray Digital	country
CKUA-FM-15	97.5 FM	Lloydminster*	CKUA Radio Foundation	public broadcasting
CKLM-FM	106.1 FM	Lloydminster*	912038 Alberta Ltd.	active rock
VF2411	93.5 FM	Loon Lake	Makwa Lake Resort Development	
VF251	106.9 FM	Lumsden	Moonlight Movies	
CKUY-FM	100.9 FM	Maple Creek	Maple Creek Elks Lodge	community radio
CHYP-FM	103.5 FM	Maple Creek	Brad Mason	tourist information
CKUD-FM	104.5 FM	Maple Creek	Maple Creek Elks Lodge	
CJLR-FM-7	89.9 FM	Meadow Lake	MBC Radio	First Nations community radio
CBKM	98.5 FM	Meadow Lake	CBC Radio One	public news/talk
CJNS-FM	102.3 FM	Meadow Lake	Jim Pattison Group	country
CJCQ-FM-1	104.5 FM	Meadow Lake	Jim Pattison Group	adult contemporary
CFDM-FM	105.7 FM	Meadow Lake	CFDM Radio	First nations community radio
CKJH	750 AM	Melfort	Jim Pattison Group	oldies
CJVR-FM	105.1 FM	Melfort	Jim Pattison Group	country
No Call Sign	89.1 FM	Melville	Melville and District Chamber of Commerce	tourist information (defunct?) CKMR-FM call sign belongs to Strathmore, Alberta as of March 2021.
CHEC-FM	93.7 FM	Mistawasis First Nation/Leask	Mistawasis First Nation	First Nations community radio
CJLR-FM-8	100.9 FM	Mistawasis First Nation	MBC Radio	First Nations community radio
CJLR-FM-1	89.9 FM	Montreal Lake	MBC Radio	First Nations community radio
CBKL	93.3 FM	Montreal Lake	CBC Radio One	public news/talk
CHAB	800 AM	Moose Jaw	Golden West Broadcasting	oldies
CFVZ-FM	90.9 FM	Moose Jaw	Moose Jaw Tier 1 Hockey	sports
CILG-FM	100.7 FM	Moose Jaw	Golden West Broadcasting	country
CJAW-FM	103.9 FM	Moose Jaw	Golden West Broadcasting	adult contemporary
CICN-FM	104.3 FM	Muskeg Lake Cree Nation	Muskeg Lake Cree Nation Radio Station Corporation	First Nations community radio
CKMD-FM; NEW	92.3 FM	Muskoday	Muskoday Community Radio Corporation	First Nations community radio
CJNE-FM	94.7 FM	Nipawin	CJNE-FM Radio	community radio, classic rock
CIOT-FM	104.1 FM	Nipawin	Wilderness Ministries Inc.	Christian radio
CJNB	1050 AM	North Battleford	Jim Pattison Group	country
VF2413	88.9 FM	North Battleford	Western Development Museum	community radio
CJHD-FM	93.3 FM	North Battleford	Jim Pattison Group	active rock
CJLR-FM-6	95.5 FM	North Battleford	MBC Radio	First Nations community radio
CBKF-FM-5	96.9 FM	North Battleford	Ici Radio-Canada Première	public news/talk (French)
CJCQ-FM	97.9 FM	North Battleford	Jim Pattison Group	hot adult contemporary
CBK-FM-5	99.9 FM	North Battleford	CBC Music	public music
CHBT-FM	100.5 FM	North Battleford	Battlefords Tourism and Convention Association	tourist information
CHXL-FM	95.3 FM	Okanese Indian Reserve	O.K. Creek Radio Station	First Nations community radio
VF2295	102.5 FM	Onion Lake	Onion Lake Cree Nation	First Nations community radio
CBKK-FM	105.5 FM	Patuanak	CBC Radio One	public news/talk
CJAZ-FM	89.9 FM	Pelican Narrows	MBC Radio	First Nations community radio
CBKW-FM	105.9 FM	Pelican Narrows	CBC Radio One	public news/talk
VF2483	100.9 FM	Perdue	Jim Scharf	tourist information
CFNK-FM	89.9 FM	Pinehouse Lake	Pinehouse Communications Society	First Nations community radio
CBKJ-FM	94.1 FM	Pinehouse Lake	CBC Radio One	public news/talk
CKBI	900 AM	Prince Albert	Jim Pattison Group	country
CJLR-FM-3	88.1 FM	Prince Albert	MBC Radio	First Nations community radio
CBK-FM-1	89.1 FM	Prince Albert	CBC Music	public music
CBKF-FM-6	90.1 FM	Prince Albert	Ici Radio-Canada Première	(Formerly CKSF-FM, a community-owned rebroadcaster of CBKF-FM Regina owned by Société canadienne-française de Prince Albert. Soon to be relaunched as CBKF-FM-6)
CFMM-FM	99.1 FM	Prince Albert	Jim Pattison Group	hot adult contemporary
CHQX	101.5 FM	Prince Albert	Jim Pattison Group	active rock
CIAM-FM-22	107.1 FM	Prince Albert	CARE Radio Broadcasting Association	Christian radio
CKRM	620 AM	Regina	Harvard Broadcasting	country
CJME	980 AM	Regina	Rawlco Radio	news/talk
CKSB-FM-1	88.9 FM	Regina	Ici Musique	public music (French)
CJLR-FM-4	90.3 FM	Regina	MBC Radio	First Nations community radio
CJTR-FM	91.3 FM	Regina	Radius Communications	community radio
CHMX-FM	92.1 FM	Regina	Harvard Broadcasting	rhythmic adult contemporary
CHBD-FM	92.7 FM	Regina	Bell Media Radio	country
CKCK-FM	94.5 FM	Regina	Rawlco Radio	adult hits
CBK-FM	96.9 FM	Regina	CBC Music	public music
CBKF-FM	97.7 FM	Regina	Ici Radio-Canada Première	public news/talk (French)
CIZL-FM	98.9 FM	Regina	Rawlco Radio	adult CHR
CBKR-FM	102.5 FM	Regina	CBC Radio One	public news/talk
CFWF-FM	104.9 FM	Regina	Harvard Broadcasting	active rock
CIUC-FM	95.9 FM	Regina	United Christian Broadcasters Media Canada	Christian radio
CJYM	1330 AM	Rosetown	Golden West Broadcasting	classic hits
CJWW	600 AM	Saskatoon	Saskatoon Media Group	country
CKOM	650 AM	Saskatoon	Rawlco Radio	news/talk
CBKF-2	860 AM	Saskatoon	Ici Radio-Canada Première	public news/talk (French, formerly CFNS)
CKSB-FM-2	88.7 FM	Saskatoon	Ici Musique	public music (French)
CFCR-FM	90.5 FM	Saskatoon	Community Radio Society of Saskatoon	community radio
CITT-FM	91.7 FM	Saskatoon	Saskatoon Visitor and Convention Bureau	tourist information
CKBL-FM	92.9 FM	Saskatoon	Saskatoon Media Group	country
CBK-1-FM	94.1 FM	Saskatoon	CBC Radio One	public news/talk
CFMC-FM	95.1 FM	Saskatoon	Rawlco Radio	CHR
CFWD-FM	96.3 FM	Saskatoon	Harvard Broadcasting	adult hits
CJMK-FM	98.3 FM	Saskatoon	Saskatoon Media Group	classic hits
CFAQ-FM	100.3 FM	Saskatoon	Bertor Communications	Christian radio
CJDJ-FM	102.1 FM	Saskatoon	Rawlco Radio	active rock
CIHX-FM	103.1 FM	Saskatoon	United Christian Broadcasters Media Canada	Christian radio
CIRN-FM	104.1 FM	Saskatoon	MBC Radio	First Nations community radio
CBKS-FM	105.5 FM	Saskatoon	CBC Music	public music
CJSN	1490 AM	Shaunavon	Golden West Broadcasting	classic hits
VF2301	89.9 FM	Shoal Lake	MBC Radio	First Nations community radio
CBKP	91.7 FM	Southend	CBC Radio One	public news/talk
CIRL-FM	97.9 FM	Southend	Reindeer Lake Communications	
CBKI-FM	95.5 FM	Stanley Mission	CBC Radio One	public news/talk
CFZY-FM	104.1 FM	Stockholm	Jody Herperger	community radio
CBKH-FM	93.3 FM	Stony Rapids	CBC Radio One	public news/talk
CKCP-FM	96.1 FM	Sturgeon Lake First Nation	Velmer Ermine	First Nations community radio
CKSW	570 AM	Swift Current	Golden West Broadcasting	classic hits
CIMG-FM	94.1 FM	Swift Current	Golden West Broadcasting	country
CBK-FM-4	95.7 FM	Swift Current	CBC Music	public music
CKFI-FM	97.1 FM	Swift Current	Golden West Broadcasting	adult contemporary
CJME-1-FM	101.7 FM	Swift Current	Rawlco Radio	news/talk
VF2409	97.3 FM	Thunderchild First Nation	Thunderchild First Nation	First Nations community radio
VF2142	97.9 FM	Uranium City	Northern Settlement of Uranium City	
VF2240	103.1 FM	Uranium City	Northern Settlement of Uranium City	
CBDH-FM	105.1 FM	Uranium City	CBC Radio One	public news/talk
CHTW-FM	103.5 FM	Wadena	Town of Wadena	tourist information
CFGW-FM-2	102.9 FM	Wapella	Harvard Broadcasting	hot adult contemporary
CBK-FM-2	101.5 FM	Warmley	CBC Music	public music
CJME-3-FM	107.3 FM	Warmley	Rawlco Radio	news/talk
CHQX-FM-1	90.5 FM	Waskesiu Lake	Jim Pattison Group	active rock
CFMM-FM-1	92.1 FM	Waskesiu Lake	Jim Pattison Group	CHR
CJVR-FM-2	106.3 FM	Waskesiu Lake	Jim Pattison Group	country
CBK	540 AM	Watrous	CBC Radio One	public news/talk
VF2456	89.3 FM	Weyakwin	MBC Radio	First Nations community radio
CFSL	1190 AM	Weyburn	Golden West Broadcasting	classic hits
CKRC-FM	103.5 FM	Weyburn	Golden West Broadcasting	hot adult contemporary
CHWY-FM	106.7 FM	Weyburn	Golden West Broadcasting	country
CJOE-FM	99.5 FM	Witchekan	Agency Chiefs Tribal Council	First Nations community radio
CJLK-FM	91.9 FM	Wollaston Lake	MBC Radio	First Nations community radio
CISE-FM	93.1 FM	Wolseley	Kenneth Clarke Odland	tourist information community radio
VF2426	103.1 FM	Wynyard	Roger Moskaluke	tourist information
CJGX	940 AM	Yorkton	Harvard Broadcasting	country
CBK-FM-3	91.7 FM	Yorkton	CBC Music	public music
CJLR-FM-5	92.9 FM	Yorkton	MBC Radio	First Nations community radio
CFGW-FM	94.1 FM	Yorkton	Harvard Broadcasting	hot adult contemporary
CJJC-FM	98.5 FM	Yorkton	Dennis M. Dyck	Christian radio
CBKF-FM-3	93.5 FM	Zenon Park	Ici Radio-Canada Première	public news/talk (French)
CKZP-FM	102.7 FM	Zenon Park	Radio Zenon Park	community radio
