= Ahtahkakoop Cree Nation =

First Nation in Saskatchewan, Canada

- Band No. 406
- atâhk-akohp ᐊᑖᐦᑲᑯᐦᑊ
- People: Cree
- Treaty: Treaty 6
- Headquarters: Shell Lake
- Province: Saskatchewan

Land
- Other reserve: Ahtahkakoop 104
- Land area: 173.473 km^{2} (66.978 sq mi)

Population (2019)
- On reserve: 1,944
- On other land: 3
- Off reserve: 2,248
- Total population: 4,304

Government
- Chief: Larry Ahenakew
- Council: Lanny Ahenakew; Jodie Albert; Bryce Isbister; Patricia Isbister; Joey Ledoux; Carmen Little; David Masuskapoe; Barry Sasakamoose; Karen Sasakamoose; Rodney Sasakamoose; Stanley Sasakamoose; Cynthia Williams-Johnstone

Tribal Council
- Battlefords Agency Tribal Chiefs

Website
- ahtahkakoop.ca

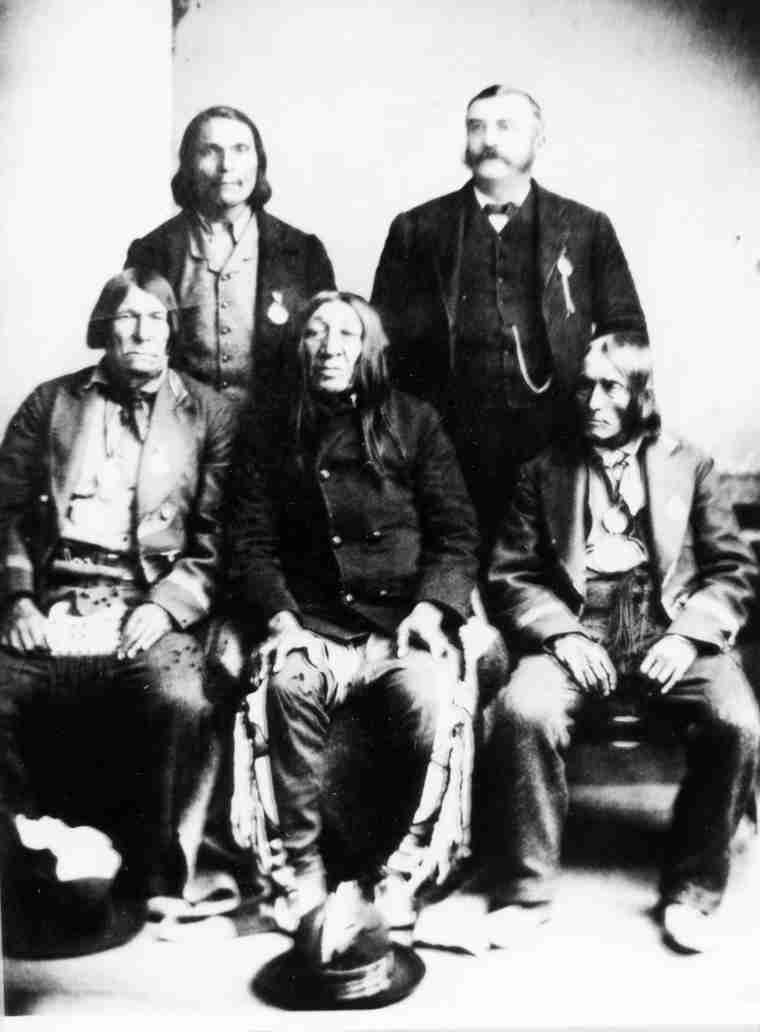
Chief John Ahtahkakoop, seated bottom left.

Ahtahkakoop Cree Nation (Cree: ᐊᑖᐦᑲᑯᐦᑊ atâhkakohp, meaning Starblanket, name of the first chief of the Band) is a Cree First Nation band government in Shell Lake, Saskatchewan, Canada, belonging to the Wāskahikaniwiyiniwak (House Cree) division of nēhiyawak. The Ahtahkakoop First Nation government and community is located on Ahtahkakoop 104, 72 kilometres northwest of Prince Albert and is 17,347 hectares in size. Ahtahkakoop Cree Nation neighbours the surrounding Cree communities of: Big River First Nation to the north, Pelican Lake First Nation, and Witchekan Lake First Nation to the west, and the Mistawasis Nêhiyawak to the south. The community was formerly known as the "Sandy Lake Indian Band", a name which is still used interchangeably when referring to the reserve.

== History ==
The name of this reserve originated from its first chief who was born about 1816 on the vast prairie region that was home to his people. He was named Ahtahkakoop, which in Cree means "Starblanket". He was a Head Chief of the Plains Cree, and presided over the Wāskahikaniwiyiniwak (House Cree) people of northern Saskatchewan. The plain buffalos were once the most important resource to Ahtahkakoop and his people. By 1860s, with the arrival of European settlers the buffalo disappeared rapidly. The chief understood that the ways of living that his band was used to needed to change in order to get through the crisis. To help his people transit from hunter and warrior to farmer a reservation is needed. In 1874 the chief invited Anglican missionary John Hines to settle with his people near Sandy Lake. On August 23, 1876, Chief Ahtahkakoop signed Treaty 6 at Fort Carlton, giving up their vast hunting territory in exchange for a 67-square-mile reserve and $5 a year "per head". When the treaty was signed, the population of his band was 185 members. He wished to have a reserve adjoining Mistawasis on the Green Lake Trail at Sandy Lake given his band already had houses and gardens there. By the time of treaty signing; Ahtahkakoop and his people had strong kinship ties with the Mistawasis, Flying Dust, Witchekan Lake, and Pelican Lake communities which led to a high population and collective economy surrounding Green Lake. The reserve was surveyed in the summer and fall of 1878, but when the survey was completed the reserve was neither in the location nor of the size that had been advised to the surveyors. Chief Ahtahkakoop died on December 4, 1896, and Kamiyoastotin became chief. The land at Sandy Lake was fertile, and though the band suffered many hardships and setbacks, progress was made. The 1929 fall in market prices, followed by prolonged drought, forced people off reserve as they sought employment clearing land and helping on farms. The first church was built in 1874, and Reverend Hines started the first school in 1876. The band's infrastructure includes a school, workshop, warehouse, police station, RCMP residences, fire hall, health clinic, band hall, arena, gymnasium, daycare, the Lonesome Pine Convenience Store, the Indian Child and Family Services Agency, and the Cree Nations Treatment Centre. In 2000, the band-owned Ahtahkakoop Publishing Company published its first book, Atahkakoop: The Epic Account of a Cree Head Chief, His People, and Their Struggle for Survival, 1816–1896. In August 2022, Ahtahkakoop Cree Nation became signatories to the Buffalo Treaty. Currently there are 2,706 registered members, with 1,440 people living on their 17,347-hectare reserve 72 km northwest of Prince Albert. As of January 2003 the registered population of Ahtahkakoop is 2,600 band members. The language spoken is Cree.

The Chief and Headmen who represented the Sandy Lake Indian Band at the signing of Treaty 6 in Fort Carlton were:

1. Chief Ah-tuh-uk-koop (Star Blanket)
2. Sah-Sah-Koo-Moos (Adherer)
3. Benjamin, also known as Waskitoy (Thigh)
4. Mee-Now-Ah-Chahk-Way (Good Spirit)
5. Kee-Sik-Ow-Asis (Sky Child)

== Geography and environment ==
Ahtahkakoop Cree Nation's reserve is registered as Ahtahkakoop Indian Reserve NO. 104. It is located at 72 kilometres (45 mi) north-west of Prince Albert, taking up 17,347.3 ha (42,866 acres). Ahtahkakoop Cree Nation joined the Reserve Land and Environmental Management Program and First Nation Land Management Act in 2015. Government is increasing the land holdings to pursue land development opportunities. While traditional lands and cultural sites are protected from development.

== Government ==
First Nations Elections Act is the election system used by Ahtahkakoop Cree Nation. Average length of time served in role of chief and council members is approximately 8 years. Every year two General Band Meetings will be held. Ahtahkakoop Cree Nation's General Assessment Score (2015-2016) is 10.3. Compared with 2012 the score decreased by 4.5. The percentage of eligible voters among the nation is 44.8% in 2017. Following is the table of current officials.

=== Current officials ===
Title	Surname	Given Name	Appointment Date	Expiry Date
Chief	AHENAKEW	LARRY	06/17/2025	06/17/2029
Councillor	AHENAKEW	Lanny	06/17/2025	06/17/2029
Councillor	ALBERT	JODIE	06/17/2025	06/17/2029
Councillor	ISBISTER	BRYCE	06/17/2025	06/17/2029
Councillor	ISBISTER	PATRICIA	06/17/2025	06/17/2029
Councillor	LEDOUX	JOEY	06/17/2025	06/17/2029
Councillor	LITTLE	CARMEN	06/17/2025	06/17/2029
Councillor	MASUSKAPOE	DAVID	06/17/2025	06/17/2029
Councillor	SASAKAMOOSE	BARRY	06/17/2025	06/17/2029
Councillor	SASAKAMOOSE	KAREN	06/17/2025	06/17/2029
Councillor	SASAKAMOOSE	RODNEY	06/17/2025	06/17/2029
Councillor	SASAKAMOOSE	STANLEY	06/17/2025	06/17/2029
Councillor	WILLIAMS-JOHNSTONE	CYNTHIA	06/17/2025	06/17/2029

The current government priorities are as follows:

- Improve communication between leadership and membership.
- Develop a Treaty 6 position paper.
- Establish bylaws and develop policies that govern community operations.
- Develop policies to enhance community wellbeing.
- Create a data management system.

First Nations Financial Transparency Act (FNFTA):

=== List of Chiefs ===
1. Chief Ahtahkakoop (1876-1896)
2. Chief Kamiyoastotin [Basil Starblanket] (1896-1913)
3. Chief Allan Ahenakew (1913-1953, 1955-1958)
4. Chief Lance Ahenakew (1953-1955, 1972-1974)
5. Chief Paul Ahenakew (1958-1972, 1974-1979)
6. Chief Fred Sasakamoose (1980-1983)
7. Chief Barry Ahenakew (1983-1990, 1992-2005)
8. Chief Clifford Ahenakew (1990-1992)
9. Chief Larry Ahenakew (2005-present)

== Demographics ==
In 2016 there are about 2,706 registered and 1,440 on-reserve registered population in Ahtahkakoop Cree Nation. Around 48.9% people live on the reserve. From 2010 to 2016 the on-reserve average annual population growth rate is 2.0%. On reserve the male-female ratio is about 1 to 1. Percentage for age group under 15 (27.2%), between 15 and 24 (19.9%), 25 to 64 (48,0%) and above 65 (5.0%). The average age for the registered population is 29.2. The population density is 11.4 persons per km^2.

The following table is for the registered population in April 2022.

Residency	# of People
Registered Males On Own Reserve	948
Registered Females On Own Reserve	945
Registered Males On Other Reserves	47
Registered Females On Other Reserves	58
Registered Males On Own Crown Land	0
Registered Females On Own Crown Land	2
Registered Males On Other Band Crown Land	0
Registered Females On Other Band Crown Land	1
Registered Males On No Band Crown Land	1
Registered Females On No Band Crown Land	0
Registered Males Off Reserve	921
Registered Females Off Reserve	917
Total Registered Population	3,840

== Language ==
In 2016 there are about 1,475 people who know certain language. Around 380 people know how to speak Indigenous language and around 1,470 people know English. 20.0% of the population learned Indigenous languages first. 20.0% of the population speak indigenous language at home. About 25.8% of the people can speak and understand the Cree language.

== Traditional culture ==
Ahtahkakoop's culture is deeply rooted in Nêhiyaw (Plains Cree) traditions, language, spirituality, and values. Contemporary efforts dating to the turn of century has shown community proactivity in securing and preserving traditional ways of life native to the Fort People (Wāskahikaniwiyiniwak) of Northern Saskatchewan. As Wāskahikaniwiyiniwak (House Cree), the people of Ahtahkakoop differed from their southern Plains Cree relatives of the open prairies: Ahtahkakoop's traditional territories stretched the northern forests of Saskatchewan neighbouring the Woodland Cree, and their residence in the dense woodlands made for their ceremonies, practices, and ways of life hidden from observance by the increasing non-Indigenous population in the province. In strengthening their culture, the community of Ahtahkakoop promotes the ceremonies of Round Dances, Sun Dances (or Thirst Dances), Sweat Lodges, Memorial Feasts, Powwows, and among other ceremonies as celebrated events honoring the sacred traditions of their Cree identity. The aforementioned ceremonies are a constant presence at the community; and the emphasis on elder's teachings reaffirm the passing of knowledge and traditions to the younger generation.

The establishment of cultural workshops and land-based learning curriculums are key factors in promoting and preserving the traditions of the Cree community.

== Education ==
The education authority of Ahtahkakoop Cree Nation is the Treaty 6 Education Council. About 734 students are enrolled in elementary and secondary school, and about 159 post-secondary students are enrolled. 41.3% aboriginal identity population aged 15 years and over received a high school diploma or equivalent. While 24.9% of the aboriginal identity population received a postsecondary certificate, diploma or degree. 99% of the teacher are from First Nation, and 80% of them have been teaching on-reserve for at least 5 years. High school graduation rate is near 45%. The government is working to ensure Treaty teachings are delivered in all classrooms from Kindergarten to Grade 12. More financial funding will be attributed to education. Formal education, lifelong learning, and employment development are stressed to assist the people in meeting their maximum potential. The education database is under construction.

== Notable people ==
- Chief Ahtahkakoop, a leading Chief of the Saskatchewan Plains Cree.
- Edward Ahenakew, Anglican clergyman and author, known for collecting and transcribing cultural stories and tales. As well as advocating for better education for Indigenous people.
- Fred Sasakamoose, NHL player, first Treaty Indigenous player, who advocated for Indigenous athletes across North America.
- Freda Ahenakew, author, considered a leader in cultural and linguistic preservation of Indigenous language and heritage.
- David Ahenakew, politician, and former National Chief of the Assembly of First Nations.
- Deborah Chatsis, author.

== See also ==
- List of First Nations governments
