= CFRG =

CFRG may refer to:

== Radio call signs ==
one of two radio stations in Gravelbourg, Saskatchewan, Canada:

- CFRG (AM), a defunct AM radio station that was affiliated with the Première Chaîne network,
- CFRG-FM, an active FM community radio station.

Despite the shared call sign, the stations never had common ownership.

== Cryptography ==
CFRG may also refer to the Crypto Forum Research Group of the Internet Research Task Force (IRTF)
