= Vern Harper =

Canadian Cree activist

- Asin or Asini

Cree leader

Personal details
- Born: June 17, 1936
- Died: May 12, 2018 (aged 81) Toronto, Ontario
- Resting place: Pine Hills Cemetery, Toronto
- Spouse(s): Pauline Shirt; Jerrilynn Harper
- Mother tongue: Cree

Vern Harper (Traditional Name: Asin, meaning Stone/Grandfather) Vernon Harper born on June 17, 1936 in Regent Park Toronto, Ontario – May 12, 2018) was a Canadian First Nations Cree Elder, medicine man, and Aboriginal rights activist.

The “Urban Elder” was a fifth generation grandson of Mistawasis, a hereditary Cree chief, and a sixth generation grandson of Big Bear.

== Early life ==
In Toronto's Regent Park, Harper had a difficult and traumatic childhood, and was placed into the foster care system after the death of his mother. He was raised in a Protestant foster home. In his early teens, he returned to his mother's traditional territory in Mistawasis, Saskatchewan, where he learned his traditions and language.

== Service in the military ==
Vern Harper was a United States military veteran. At the young age of 17, from 1952 to 1953 he served in The Korean War in the 82ND Airborne Division. He was a paratrooper specializing in parachute assault operations into denied areas.

== Political activism ==
In the mid to late 1960s he lived in San Francisco, where he was a peer of the legendary singers Janis Joplin and Jim Morrison. Here he was introduced to the American Indian Movement (AIM), for which he soon led the Toronto branch.

Harper became politically active as vice-president of the Ontario Metis and Non-Status Indian Association in 1972.

Vern and his then-wife Pauline Shirt united the Toronto Warrior Society with the Ojibway Warrior Society of Kenora (led by Louis Cameron) and the Regina Warrior Society (led by Wayne Stonechild) to create the Native People’s Caravan in 1974, a cross Canada trek to raise awareness of broken treaties and grievances against the Canadian government. Together they were Dissidents for Native Peoples Rights. He later authored a book on the caravan, Following The Red Road: The Native People’s Caravan, 1974 (1979).

In 1976, he founded the Wandering Spirit Survival School of Toronto (now known as First Nations School of Toronto) with Shirt.

== Later life and career ==
Mr. Harper was one of a few First Nations Elders with Chaplain Status, as recognized by the Correctional Service of Canada. As such, he provided spiritual services, sweat lodge ceremonies and traditional counseling to Aboriginal inmates. He also counseled Aboriginal youth offenders. As Resident Elder at the Centre for Addiction and Mental Health (CAMH) in Toronto, he promoted the role of First Nations spirituality in the treatment of mental health and addiction.

Elder Vern Harper-Asin was the Elder for the "Reaching Out: Child Abuse Monument". He performed traditional aboriginal blessings, purification and healing ceremonies as part of Child Abuse Monument events, quilt square workshops and during activities in the sculpting studio and bronze casting foundry. The imagery in the palm of his hand on his monument quilt square is a spider representing his identification as "Heyoka". The Heyoka's humor and role as a clever and compassionate trickster were always close a hand in the traditional storytelling and ceremonies he performed. The written message Elder Harper-Asin engraved in the permanence of bronze beside his monument hand laments, "I pray that the memory of the pain will leave forever – All my relations. Asin”.

He was a strong leader and remained deeply connected to Okichitaw Martial Arts where he not only provided traditional knowledge, but also spiritual support for all those who participates in this indigenous system. Elder Vern Harper-Asin was involved with Okichitaw from its early stages, advising and encouraging in its development and used to officiate at various Okichitaw ceremonies and promotion tests.

In 1997, Mr. Harper was the subject of the National Film Board documentary Urban Elder by Robert S. Adams which chronicled his life and role of community leader and Traditional Elder in an urban setting.

He died on May 12, 2018, at the age of 81, and was laid to rest at Pine Hills Cemetery, in Toronto, on May 18, 2018.

== Family ==
Vern Harper has left behind his wife of 37 years Jerrilynn Harper, his daughters Carly, Cotee, (Gloria predeceased) susan, deanna, luanna, his sons (Richard Predeceased)Vernon Jr predeceased)Vincent predeceased) Clayton, ted, les, his grandchildren Tecumseh, meyosin-bawaajigan, Raine, Justin, Faith, charels, ramona, marina, leonard, (Leslie predeceased) debbie, bruce, bradley, richie, darnell, aron, rose, levi, felesha, cheyenne, joseph, julia, serafina, anthony, raymond, Dakota, phoenix, pauline. His brother Kenneth, his son-in-law Theo, and his sisters-in-laws Elaine Cote and Carolyn Cote, and brother-in-law artist Philip Cote. He was predeceased by his brothers Edward and Victor.
