= Fred Sasakamoose =

Canadian ice hockey player (1933–2020)

CM Fred Sasakamoose "Running Deer"
- Fred Sasakamoose, Cree NHL player
- Born: December 25, 1933 Debden, Saskatchewan, Canada
- Died: November 24, 2020 (aged 86) Prince Albert, Saskatchewan, Canada
- Height: 5 ft 8 in (173 cm)
- Weight: 165 lb (75 kg; 11 st 11 lb)
- Position: Centre
- Shot: Right
- Played for: Chicago Black Hawks
- Playing career: 1953–1960

Frederick Sasakamoose, CM (December 25, 1933 – November 24, 2020) was a Canadian professional ice hockey player. He was one of the first Canadian Indigenous players in the National Hockey League, and the first First Nations player with treaty status. He played 11 games with the Chicago Black Hawks during the 1953–54 season; the rest of his career, which lasted from 1953 to 1960, was spent in various minor leagues. After his playing career, Sasakamoose became involved in Indigenous affairs, and served as chief of the Ahtahkakoop Cree Nation for a period. He was later recognized for his work, including being named a member of the Order of Canada.

== Early life ==
Sasakamoose was born in the Big River First Nation to Roderick and Judith Sasakamoose, and grew up on the Ahtahkakoop Indian Reserve in Saskatchewan. At his birth, he was given a Cree name by an elder which when translated, means "to stand firm". In his early years, Sasakamoose developed a close relationship with his paternal grandfather, Alexander Sasakamoose, who could neither speak nor hear. As a five year old, the young Sasakamoose was taught how to skate by his grandfather, who had tied bob skates over the young boys moccasins. He was one of 11 children, of whom six died in childhood from smallpox. When he was six years old, Canadian authorities forced Sasakamoose and his brother into a truck and took them to an Indian residential school in Duck Lake, Saskatchewan. It was there he learned to play ice hockey.

He is the great-great nephew of Chief Ahtahkakoop, who was brother to his great-grandfather Sasakamoose.

== Hockey career ==
In 1944 Sasakamoose joined the Duck Lake ice hockey team. Sasakamoose's skills were first recognized by a priest in Montreal who became the sports director at the Indian residential school Sasakamoose was attending. The priest pushed Sasakamoose to improve himself, and he developed an extraordinary left-handed shot as a result. Sasakamoose had a troubled time at the school: when he was nine he was raped by fellow students, and detailed other punishments by the school officials. While Sasakamoose became one of the star players on the school's team, he left Duck Lake at the age of 15 and so feared returning to the school that he didn't believe at first when a priest had a hockey scout visit his home.

Ultimately Sasakamoose did meet the scout, and at the age of 16 joined the junior Moose Jaw Canucks, who played in the Western Canada Junior Hockey League. After scoring 31 goals during the 1953–54 season he was named the league's most valuable player. During the season he made his NHL debut with the Chicago Black Hawks, playing November 20, 1953 against the Boston Bruins. Sasakamoose played two games with Chicago before being sent back to junior, though he was called up again a few months later after Moose Jaw's season ended in February 1954. Sasakamoose played 11 games for the Black Hawks that season, recording no points. The rest of his career was spent in various minor leagues.

== Post-hockey life ==
After retiring from ice hockey, Sasakamoose became a band councilor of the Ahtahkakoop Cree Nation, serving for 35 years, and spent one term (6 years) as Chief. He was also extensively involved in the development of sports programs for Indigenous children. Starting in 1961, he used his fame to promote opportunities for youth in sports which included ice hockey, long-distance running, track and field, soccer, and basketball. In 2002, he was honoured by the Blackhawks at a home game. He was inducted into the Saskatchewan Sports Hall of Fame in the builders category in 2007. He was also inducted into the Prince Albert Sports Hall of Fame, Meadow Lake Wall of Fame, FSIN Circle of Honour, and the Canadian Native Hockey Hall of Fame. He was acknowledged for achievements and contributions by both the Assembly of First Nations and the Federation of Saskatchewan Indian Nations (FSIN). He was also a founding member of the Northern Indian Hockey League. He became a member of the Order of Canada in 2018.

== Death ==
Sasakamoose was admitted to hospital in Prince Albert, Saskatchewan, where he was diagnosed with COVID-19 on November 20, 2020. He died four days later due to complications from the virus during the COVID-19 pandemic in Saskatchewan. He was buried at the Ahtahkakoop First Nation Cemetery in Ahtakhakoop, Saskatchewan.

He married Loretta Isbister in 1955, and had nine children. At the time of his death, Sasakamoose's memoir, Call Me Indian, was being finished, and had a scheduled release date of April 6, 2021.

== Career statistics ==
=== Regular season and playoffs ===
			Regular season					Playoffs
Season	Team	League	GP	G	A	Pts	PIM	GP	G	A	Pts	PIM
1950–51	Moose Jaw Canucks	WCJHL	18	7	7	14	9	—	—	—	—	—
1951–52	Moose Jaw Canucks	WCJHL	42	19	22	41	59	—	—	—	—	—
1952–53	Moose Jaw Canucks	WJHL	36	18	17	35	40	9	7	5	12	4
1953–54	Moose Jaw Canucks	WJHL	34	31	26	57	56	5	4	2	6	8
1953–54	Chicago Black Hawks	NHL	11	0	0	0	6	—	—	—	—	—
1954–55	New Westminster Royals	WHL	21	3	8	11	6	—	—	—	—	—
1954–55	Chicoutimi Sagueneens	QHL	22	4	4	8	2	6	2	1	3	2
1955–56	Calgary Stampeders	WHL	2	0	0	0	2	—	—	—	—	—
1956–57	Kamloops Chiefs	OSHL	23	7	10	17	36	—	—	—	—	—
1957–58	Kamloops Chiefs	OSHL	51	26	27	53	63	15	7	6	13	34
1958–59	Kamloops Chiefs	OSHL	20	10	20	30	42	5	0	0	0	0
1960–61	North Battleford Beavers	SIHA	—	—	—	—	—	—	—	—	—	—
NHL totals			11	0	0	0	6	—	—	—	—	—
