= CJOE =

CJOE may refer to:

- CJOE-FM, a radio station (99.5 FM) licensed to Witchekan, Saskatchewan, Canada
- CJBK, a radio station (1290 AM) licensed to London, Ontario, Canada, which held the call sign CJOE from 1967 to 1972
