= Edward Ahenakew =

Indigenous clergyman

- Born: June 11, 1885; Ahtahkakoop, Saskatchewan
- Died: July 12, 1961 (aged 76); Dauphin, Manitoba, Canada
- Education: Wycliffe College; Emmanuel College
- Occupations: Clergyman; author

Edward Ahenakew (June 11, 1885 – July 12, 1961) was a Canadian Cree Anglican clergyman and author who was known for preserving and transcribing many stories and myths local to the Indigenous people's of Western Canada.

== Biography ==
Edward Ahenakew was born on June 11, 1885, in Ahtahkakoop, Saskatchewan, to Baptiste Ahenakew (1853–1937) and Ellen Ermineskin (1863–1950). He was a grand-nephew to Chief Ahtahkakoop, who was a brother to his grandfather Ahenakew. As a young boy, Edward was enrolled in the Ahtahkakoop Day School and worked under the tutelage of his uncle Louis Ahenakew, who taught at the local school. In 1896, his father took him to the Emmanuel College Indian Boarding School in Prince Albert, where he was greeted by two cousins of his. Following his two year study at Anglican Wycliffe College, Toronto, Edward completed his studies in theology at the Emmanuel College, Saskatoon, where he graduated in 1910 with his degree of licentiate in theology. In 1912, he was officially ordained as an Anglican priest.

In 1923, while recovering from ill-health, he preserved the stories and tales given to him by Chief Thunder Child, which were transcribed in the posthumously published Voices of the Plains Cree (1973). Ahenakew had come to Thunder Child's reserve in 1922, and in the following spring, used his compilation of stories and legends of his people as therapy for his illness. Throughout the 1920s and 30s he engaged in activism for Indigenous issues and advocated for better education for First Nations children. Ahenakew had also helped edit a 26,000 word Cree-English Dictionary which was published in 1938. Ahenakew was awarded an honorary doctorate of divinity from Emmanuel College in 1947. He died on July 12, 1961, while travelling to Dauphin, Manitoba, where he was helping in establishing a summer school.
