= Starblanket =

Starblanket may refer to: A blanket (of native culture) sew together with different articles of fabric that forms a star in the middle. It is typically given to people as gifts for special occasions (birth, graduation, marriage etc).

== People ==
- Ahtahkakoop (Cree: Atāhkakohp, "Starblanket", c. 1816–1896), Cree chief
- Ahchuchhwahauhhatohapit, or Ahchacoosacootacoopits (Cree: Acāhkosa kā-otakohpit, "[One who has] Star[s for a ]blanket"), Cree chief
- Noel Starblanket (born 1946), First Nation leader

== First Nation ==
- Star Blanket Cree Nation
