= Index of Saskatchewan-related articles =

Articles related to Saskatchewan include:

== A ==
- Aboriginal peoples in Saskatchewan
- [+] Aboriginal peoples in Saskatchewan categories
- Aboriginal People's Party
- Agriculture in Saskatchewan
- Airports – list
- [+] Airports
  - [+] Airports – Defunct

== B ==
- Bay Trail, Saskatchewan
- Bible Belt
- Blackfoot
- Large blizzard sweeps through British Columbia, Northern Alberta and Saskatchewan – January 10, 2007 Wikinews Exclusives Original reporting
- Block Settlement
- [+] Bridges in Saskatchewan
- [+] Buildings and Structures

== C ==
- [+] Canada-related lists
- Canadian Companies
- Canadian Prairies
- [+] Canadian projects
- Census Divisions
- [+] Cities
- Climate change in Saskatchewan
- Coat of Arms of Saskatchewan
- [+] Colleges
- Commemorative Medal for the Centennial of Saskatchewan
- Communist Party of Canada (Saskatchewan)
- Communities – towns, cities, villages
- [+] Companies based in Saskatchewan
- [+] Companies of Canada
- Constitution Act, 1930 (annotated)/Schedule (3) – Wikisource
- Cooperative Commonwealth Federation
- Corner Gas Canadian situation comedy of Dog River Saskatchewan AKA
- Corner Gas – Wikiquote
- Corner Gas -Wikinews
- Court of Appeal
- [+] Crown corporations of Saskatchewan
- [+] Culture
- [+] Curlers from Saskatchewan
- Curling – provincial sport

== D ==
- District of Saskatchewan – pre 1905
- Districts of the Northwest Territories – pre 1905
- [+] Districts of the Northwest Territories categories – pre 1905
- Dominion Land Survey

== E ==
- Education in Canada
- [+] Education
- Economic Group
- Elections, general – FEATURE list status
- [+] Elections, Categories
- [+] electoral districts
- Executive Council of Saskatchewan
- Extreme communities of Canada

== F ==
- [+] federal electoral districts
- [+] federal electoral districts – defunct
- [+] First Nations governments in Saskatchewan
- [+] First Nations in Saskatchewan
- Flag of Saskatchewan
- [+] Flora of Saskatchewan
- Fransaskois

== G ==
- Gabriel Dumont Institute
- [+] Geography
- [+] Geographical short articles
- [+] Ghost towns in Saskatchewan

== H ==
- [+] High schools in Saskatchewan
- Highways – List
- [+] Highways -Categories
- [+] History
- History of Courts
- History of immigration to Canada
- History of Northwest Territories capital cities – pre 1905
- [+] Hospitals in Saskatchewan

== I ==
- Ice Hockey teams
- Indian reserves in Saskatchewan
- [+] Indigenous peoples of the Americas

== J ==
- [+] Junior Hockey League players
- [+] Junior Hockey League teams
- [+] Junior Hockey League teams – Defunct

== L ==
- [+] Lakes of Saskatchewan
- [+] Law
- [+] Law Enforcement
- Leader of the Opposition (Saskatchewan)
- Legislative Assembly of Saskatchewan
- Lieutenant Governor of Saskatchewan
- [+] Lieutenant governors of Saskatchewan

== M ==
- [+] Mayors of places in Saskatchewan
- [+] Mayors of Moose Jaw – category
- Mayors of Moose Jaw, Saskatchewan – list
- mayors of Regina, Saskatchewan
- [+] Media
- [+] Members of the Canadian House of Commons from Saskatchewan
- MLA's
- Monarchy in Saskatchewan
- [+] Museums
- Music of Saskatchewan
- [+] musicians

== N ==
- National Parks
- Natural History
- New Green Alliance
- NDP/CCF Member articles
- [+] Newspapers published in Saskatchewan
- North-West Rebellion
- Northwest Territories – Early pre 1905 history

== O ==
- [+] Organizations

== P ==
- [+] Parks in Saskatchewan
- [+] People
- [+] People from Regina
- [+] Photographs Requested
- [+] Politicians
- Political parties
- [+] Politics
- Postal Codes for Saskatchewan
- [+] Pre-Confederation Saskatchewan people
- Premier of Saskatchewan
- Premiers of Saskatchewan -list
- [+] Premiers
- Progressive Conservative Party of Saskatchewan
- [+] provincial electoral districts
- [+] Provincial electoral districts – historical
- Provincial parks
- [+] Provincial political parties in Saskatchewan
- provincial and territorial symbols
- Provincial Rights Party
- [+] Provinces and Territories of Canada categories
- Provinces and territories of Canada
- Provincial Court

== Q ==
- Queen's Bench

== R ==
- [+] Radio stations in Saskatchewan – category
- Radio stations in Saskatchewan – list
- [+] Railways of Saskatchewan
- [+] Regina – Capital City
- Regions of Saskatchewan – list
- Regions of Canada, Saskatchewan – list
- [+] Restaurants in Saskatchewan
- Rivers – List
- [+] Rivers
- Roads – project
- Roads – list
- Roddy Piper – Wikiquote
- Rupert's Land – Pre 1868 / 1870
- Rupert's Land and North-Western Territory Order – Wikisource
- Rural Municipalities – list
- [+] Rural Municipalities

== S ==
- Same-sex marriage in Saskatchewan
- Saskatchewan
- Saskatchewan Act, The
- Saskatchewan Act from Wikisource
- Saskatchewan Archaeological Society
- Saskatchewan Archives Board
- [+] Saskatchewan – Articles which are stubs
- [+] Saskatchewan – Articles finished or categories
- Saskatchewan category of pictures
- Saskatchewan – Commons pictures
- Saskatchewan Dragoons
- Saskatchewan Filmpool Cooperative
- [+] Saskatchewan law
- Saskatchewan from The New Student's Reference Work – Wikisource
- Saskatchewan History – the magazine
- Saskatchewan Film and Video Classification Board
- Saskatchewan Liberal Party
- Saskatchewan New Democrats
- Saskatchewan Order of Merit
- Saskatchewan Party
- [+] Saskatchewan Roughriders
- [+] Wikipedians interested in Saskatchewan Roughriders
- [+] Saskatchewan Roughriders players
- Saskatchewan Youth Parliament
- [+] School districts in Saskatchewan
- School Divisions
- [+] Schools in Saskatchewan
- [+] Schools – elementary – in Saskatchewan
- Scouting in Saskatchewan
- [+] Senators from Saskatchewan – category
- Senators from Saskatchewan – list
- [+] Shopping malls in Saskatchewan
- Social Credit Party of Saskatchewan
- [+] Sports
- [+] Sports people
- [+] Sports teams
- [+] Sports venues in Saskatchewan

== T ==
- The Saskatchewan Act
- Television stations in Saskatchewan – category
- Television stations in Saskatchewan – list
- Territorial evolution of Canada
- Time in Saskatchewan
- Tommy Douglas – Wikiquote
- [+] Transport in Saskatchewan
- [+] Trees of Saskatchewan

== U ==
- Umeå – sister city
- Unionest Party
- United Reform
- University of Saskatchewan
- [+] University of Saskatchewan
  - [+] Academic staff of the University of Saskatchewan
  - [+] University of Saskatchewan alumni
  - [+] University of Saskatchewan Presidents
- [+] Universities
- [+] Uranium mines

== W ==
- Wanuskewin Heritage Park
- Western Canada Concept Party of Saskatchewan
- Western Independence Party of Saskatchewan
- [+] Wikipedians in Saskatchewan

== See also ==
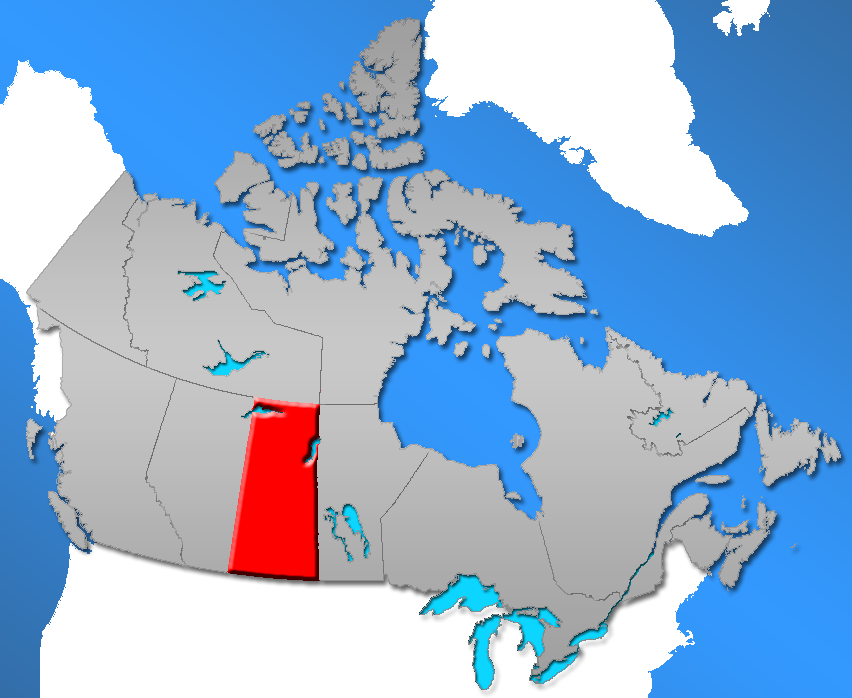
Lists of topics by provinces and territories
