= Hines Lake =

Lake in Saskatchewan, Canada

- Sandy Lake
- Location in Saskatchewan Hines Lake (Canada)
- Location: Ahtahkakoop Indian reserve, Saskatchewan
- Coordinates: 53.4008°N 106.9609°W
- Etymology: Anglican missionary John Hines
- Basin countries: Canada
- Max. length: 7.2 km (4.5 mi)
- Max. width: 1.1 km (0.7 mi)
- Max. depth: 11.9 m (39 ft)
- Shore length^{1}: 19 km (12 mi)
- Surface elevation: 502 m (1,647 ft)
- ^{1} Shore length is not a well-defined measure.

Hines Lake, also known as Sandy Lake, is a lake in the Canadian province of Saskatchewan. The lake, named after Anglican missionary John Hines, is entirely within the Ahtahkakoop Indian reserve. The main settlement of the reserve is at the southern end of the lake. Access is from Highway 790.

In October 1874, Chief Ahtahkakoop of the Ahtahkakoop Cree Nation met with John Hines. Chief Ahtahkakoop, whose band was camped at Sandy Lake, convinced Hines to come to the lake because it was on the Green Lake leg of the Carlton Trail and the area had fertile land, hay meadows, and timber. John Hines spent 14 years from 1874 to 1888 at the lake as a Christian missionary and teacher before moving to The Pas, Manitoba.

== Fish species ==
Fish commonly found in Hines Lake include burbot and walleye.

== See also ==
- List of lakes of Saskatchewan
