= CHEC-FM =

Coordinates: 53°10′28″N 106°48′24″W

- Mistawasis First Nation, Saskatchewan; Canada
- Frequency: 93.7 MHz

Programming
- Format: First Nations community radio
- Affiliations: Missinipi Broadcasting Corporation

Ownership
- Owner: Mistawasis Nêhiyawak; (Mistawasis First Nation Radio)

History
- First air date: 2011

Technical information
- ERP: 47 watts
- HAAT: 23.4 metres

Links
- Webcast: Listen Live
- Website: mistawasis.ca

CHEC-FM is a First Nations community radio station that operates at 93.7 FM in Mistawasis First Nation, Saskatchewan, Canada.

Owned by Director of Operations, Mistawasis First Nations Radio, the station received Canadian Radio-television and Telecommunications Commission approval on February 14, 2011.

CHEC-FM airs locally produced programming, while its remaining programming is from the MBC radio network.
