= CKBI =

CKBI may refer to:

- CKBI (AM), a radio station (900 AM) licensed to Prince Albert, Saskatchewan, Canada
- CKBI-FM, a radio rebroadcaster (95.9 FM) licensed to La Ronge, Saskatchewan, Canada, rebroadcasting CKBI
- CKBI-TV, a defunct television station (channel 5) formerly in Prince Albert, Saskatchewan, Canada
