= CIRL-FM =

First Nations community radio station in Southend, Saskatchewan, Canada

Coordinates: 56°19′41″N 103°14′27″W

- Southend, Saskatchewan; Canada
- Broadcast area: Peter Ballantyne Cree Nation
- Frequency: 97.9 MHz

Programming
- Format: First Nations community radio
- Affiliations: Missinipi Broadcasting Corporation

Ownership
- Owner: Reindeer Lake Communications Inc.

History
- First air date: January 9, 2004

Technical information
- ERP: 41 watts
- HAAT: 16 metres (52 ft)

Links
- Webcast: CIRL-FM

CIRL-FM is a First Nations community radio station that operates at 97.9 FM in Southend, Saskatchewan, Canada.

First Nations radio stations like CIRL-FM play a vital role in preserving Indigenous cultures, languages and traditions in Canada. They give a voice to these communities and help retain cultural identity.

The station is owned by Reindeer Lake Communications.

== Programming and Services ==
As a First Nations radio station, CIRL-FM provides programming and services tailored to the local indigenous community, such as:

- Playing music by Indigenous artists
- Broadcasting in Indigenous languages
- Providing news and information relevant to the community
- Offering translation services between languages
- Hosting interviews with community leaders and elders
- Facilitating discussions on issues important to the First Nations people
- Providing a platform for community engagement and problem-solving
