= Ahtahkakoop 104 =

Indian reserve in Saskatchewan, Canada

Coordinates: 53°23′29″N 106°53′10″W

- Indian reserve
- Ahtahkakoop Indian Reserve No. 104
- Location in Saskatchewan
- First Nation: Ahtahkakoop
- Country: Canada
- Province: Saskatchewan

Area
  - Total: 17,347.3 ha (42,866 acres)

Population (2016)
  - Total: 1,472
  - Density: 8.485/km^{2} (21.98/sq mi)
- Community Well-Being Index: 54

Ahtahkakoop 104 is an Indian reserve of the Ahtahkakoop Cree Nation in Saskatchewan. It is about 72 kilometres (45 mi) northwest of Prince Albert. In the 2016 Canadian Census, it recorded a population of 1,472 living in 386 of its 424 total private dwellings. In the same year, its Community Well-Being index was calculated at 54 of 100, compared to 58.4 for the average First Nations community and 77.5 for the average non-Indigenous community.

The community, which is situated at the southern end of Hines Lake, is accessed from Highway 790.

== See also ==
- List of Indian reserves in Saskatchewan
- List of Indian reserves in Canada
- List of communities in Saskatchewan
