= Deborah Chatsis =

Canadian diplomat

Deborah Chatsis CM was the Ambassador of Canada to Vietnam, Director of South Asia Relations, Global Affairs Canada, Ambassador of Canada to Guatemala and High Commissioner to Belize.

Chatsis was born in Chilliwack, British Columbia; she grew up in Prince Albert, Saskatchewan as a member of Ahtahkakoop First Nation.

A University of Saskatchewan graduate (Bachelor's of Science in Mechanical Engineering, 1983 and a Bachelor of Laws 1986), she continued on to earn a Master of Laws degree from the University of Ottawa in which she specialized in international law. After a break in her educational career, she returned to school, this time from the John F. Kennedy School of Government at Harvard University where she earned a Master in Public Administration. She attended as a Fulbright Scholar from 2006 to 2007. The University of Saskatchewan awarded her an honorary Doctor of Laws in 2015.
