= John Hines (missionary) =

English Christian missionary

- Born: February 20, 1850; England
- Died: February 25, 1931
- Occupations: Missionary, clergyman, author
- Known for: Introducing Christianity and agriculture to Indigenous populations in Saskatchewan, Canada
- Notable work: The Red Indians of the Plains: Thirty Years' Missionary Experience in the Saskatchewan

John Hines (February 20, 1850 – February 25, 1931) was an English Christian missionary, clergyman, and author who immigrated to Saskatchewan, Canada, in 1874. Hines was sent to Saskatchewan by the Church Mission Society (CMS) to introduce Christianity and agriculture to the Indigenous populations. He first settled in Green Lake then moved to Whitefish Lake, when he discovered that Green Lake was not suitable for an agricultural based settlement.

In October 1874, he had a meeting with Chief Ahtahkakoop of Ahtahkakoop Cree Nation. After which, he decided to move to Sandy Lake where the chief's band was camped. The band boasted that there was "fertile land, hay meadows, and timber" there. After 14 years at Sandy Lake, he was transferred to The Pas, Manitoba. He remained in The Pas until 1902, at which point he was appointed supervisor of Indian missions in the Saskatchewan diocese in Prince Albert. He remained there until his retirement in 1911.

== Publications ==
- Hines, John (1915). The red Indians of the plains: thirty years' missionary experience in the Saskatchewan. SPCK. full text available online
