= CFDM-FM =

First Nations radio station on the Flying Dust First Nation, Saskatchewan, Canada

Coordinates: 54°08′11″N 108°24′15″W

- Meadow Lake, Saskatchewan; Canada
- Broadcast area: Flying Dust First Nation
- Frequency: 105.7 MHz

Programming
- Languages: English, Cree
- Format: community radio

Ownership
- Owner: FDB Broadcasting Incorporated

Technical information
- Class: LP
- ERP: 47 watts vertical polarization only
- HAAT: 22.4 metres (73 ft)

Links
- Website: cfdm.sasktelwebhosting.com

CFDM-FM (105.7 FM) is a community radio station serving the Flying Dust First Nation and the adjacent town of Meadow Lake, Saskatchewan, Canada.

CFDM radio began in the mid-1990s as a short broadcast (one to two hours each weekday) carried on the 105.7 FM frequency that had previously been used by MBC Radio's CJLR-FM. Since then the station has expanded to a week-long broadcast with live broadcast every weekday from 7 AM to 6 PM. CFDM Radio currently employs 4 people.

The CFDM-FM call sign was also used by an unrelated radio station in Drummondville, Quebec, which operated at 104.3 FM from 1970 to 1976.
