= Mistawasis 103E =

Indian reserve in Saskatchewan, Canada

Coordinates: 53°03′02″N 106°45′23″W

- Indian reserve
- Mistawasis Indian Reserve No. 103E
- Location in Saskatchewan
- First Nation: Mistawasis Nêhiyawak
- Country: Canada
- Province: Saskatchewan

Area
  - Total: 8 ha (20 acres)

Mistawasis 103E is an Indian reserve of the Mistawasis Nêhiyawak in Saskatchewan. It is 4 kilometres (2.5 mi) from Leask.

== See also ==
- List of Indian reserves in Saskatchewan
