= Pauline Shirt =

First Nations leader

Pauline Rose Shirt
- Born: July 13, 1943; Saddle Lake, Alberta
- Died: May 7, 2024 (aged 80)
- Employer: George Brown College

Pauline Rose Shirt OOnt (July 13, 1943 – May 7, 2024) was a Plains Cree Elder from Saddle Lake, Alberta, Red-Tail Hawk Clan and member of the Three Fires Society and Buffalo Dance Society. A lifelong activist and educator, she resided in Toronto, Ontario for many years. Pauline was the Elder at George Brown College in Toronto, ON. In 2023 she was appointed to the Order of Ontario.

== Activism ==
In 1974, Pauline and her then-husband Vern Harper, led the Native People's Caravan. The caravan travelled from Vancouver to Ottawa to deliver a manifesto to the government on the treatment of Indigenous peoples in Canada. Over 200 protestors peacefully gathered on Parliament Hill on September 30, 1974. Among the issues that were highlighted by the protestors were Indigenous self-governance, control over education, better housing and health services. This event is recognized as a turning point in Indigenous activism in Canada for the attention it garnered in non-Indigenous circles.

== Community work ==
Pauline was a member of the Attorney General of Ontario's Elder Advisory Council starting in 2015. The Elder's Council is an advisory body intended to guide Ontario as it works to reclaim Indigenous approaches to justice in the province.

Pauline served on the Elders Council of the Urban Indigenous Education Centre. In operation since 2008, the work of the council focuses on the well-being and opportunities for First Nations, Metis and Inuit students in the Toronto District School Board. It is guided by the Elders Council, of which Pauline Shirt was a member. Pauline also acted as cultural advisor to the Board of Directors of the imagineNATIVE Film + Media Arts Festival

=== Kapapamahchakwew - Wandering Spirit School ===
In 1976, after unsuccessfully finding a public school that was culturally appropriate for her son Clayton's education, Pauline started the Wandering Spirit Survival School (WSSS). Originally a private school that started in her living room, it was eventually declared an alternative school by the Toronto District School Board in 1977, thus making it the first school in Canada entirely operated by Native people. Kapapamahchakwew, the Wandering Spirit for whom the school was named was a Cree War Chief, with whom Pauline shared lineage, though she did not know this at the time.

WSSS operated on principles of self-determination through Native education - a response to the residential school system that had been imposed upon First Nations, Metis and Inuit in Canada. At the Wandering Spirit School, family and community were prioritized, and children learned about their traditions, culture and language through dance, storytelling, camping and song. In 1983, it was officially recognized as a Cultural Survival/Native Way school, no longer an alternative school, and paving the way for the creation of other Indigenous schools in the TDSB. In 1989, it became the First Nations School of Toronto (FNST). In 2019, there was a renaming ceremony to return it to its origins: Kapapamahchakwew - Wandering Spirit School. This renaming was emblematic of the reclaiming of the complicated story of Wandering Spirit, in which he is recast as a fierce defender of his people and not a "killer of one's own", as was the common sentiment for several generations, owing to varied interpretations of the events that transpired during the Frog Lake Massacre.

== Film credits ==
She played the role of Elder Chahigee in the 2021 film Night Raiders.

== Honours and awards ==
2020 IPPY Award Best Nonfiction Book Regional Canada East Bronze Medal for The Name Unspoken: Wandering Spirit Survival School with co-author, Sharon Berg.

2023 Named to the 2022 Appointees to the Order of Ontario.
