= Missinipi Broadcasting Corporation =

First Nations radio network in Saskatchewan, Canada

- Northern Saskatchewan; Canada
- Frequency: Varies by location
- Branding: MBC Radio

Programming
- Languages: English; Cree; Dënesųłiné
- Format: First Nations community radio

History
- First air date: 1985

Links
- Webcast: cjlr.streamon.fm
- Website: mbcradio.com

Missinipi Broadcasting Corporation, or MBC Radio, is a radio network in Canada, serving First Nations and Métis communities in the province of Saskatchewan. The network's flagship station is CJLR-FM in La Ronge. MBC Radio broadcasts to more than 70 communities in Saskatchewan, including the major urban centres, and broadcasts a streaming audio feed over the Internet. MBC's current CEO is Deborah Charles, the first female CEO of an Indigenous radio broadcast network in Canada.

== History ==
=== Background ===
Starting in the 1960s, a provincial government radio service called Northern News, broadcasting from Prince Albert, was hosted by its first producer Helga Reydon. The program, a 15-minute weekly series, addressed issues and matters of interest for fishermen and trappers in the north. However, those broadcasts were plagued by poor reception and unequal signal distribution as they were broadcast on an AM radio station in the southern part of the province and had to "skip" into the north. The program also did not air content that was culturally specific to Indigenous peoples.

The provincial government realized its shortcomings in serving the northern citizens of Saskatchewan, and in 1973, the Department of Northern Saskatchewan (DNS) began producing a new Northern News program out of La Ronge. This program was hosted by producer/announcer Barrie Ward, with Indigenous-language content added by Cree and Michif linguists Tom Roberts and Robert Merasty. The new radio program added more northern content and significantly included major Indigenous-language content. The program, however, ended with the provincial government's disbanding of the DNS in 1982.

In the late 1970s, CBC Radio also began broadcasting a northern program, Keewatin Radio. The program contained some relevant northern content and was aided by better reception due to the installation of the low-power FM relay transmitters in the north. The stories, though pertinent to the northern populace, were largely in English, and originated in Regina.

=== Formation ===
In 1983, the Government of Canada introduced the Northern Native Broadcast Access Program (NNBAP), funded and supported by the Department of Canadian Heritage. The NNBAP's aim was to enhance, protect and preserve Indigenous languages while at the same time allowing Indigenous peoples to control their own communications services.

In March 1984, a full-time coordinating committee was formed and Merasty was hired to gather information. A survey was conducted of the residents of northern Saskatchewan, the results of which gave the organizers a better idea of what Indigenous people wanted to hear on radio. Following the survey, the Missinipi Broadcasting Corporation's first board of directors was elected in 1984, with Merasty as the first CEO. The corporation implemented a basic radio skills training program in 1984 that was delivered through the local community college. The first MBC broadcast took place in February 1985 with Tom Roberts as host.

MBC's initial broadcasts were predominantly in English, with some Cree. A more advanced training program was launched at CJLR (La Ronge) in 1986. A strong focus was placed on expanding the use of Indigenous languages and the technical skills of its broadcast staff.

=== Improvements and expansion ===
During its formative years MBC was dependent on the Canadian Secretary of State (now Department of Canadian Heritage) for funding and the use of CBC transmitters in carrying its programming. Through strategic planning by MBC's second CEO, Nap Gardiner, MBC became much more independent of federal funding. Today, MBC is primarily supported by advertising revenue, along with gaming revenue from bingo broadcasts.

MBC's third CEO, Marty Ballentyne, brought about the corporation's move into TV production in 1998, serving on the board of directors for Aboriginal Peoples Television Network, Canada's (and the world's) first independent Indigenous TV network. MBC has been a major contributor to APTN, producing 39 episodes of Heartbeat Of The Earth, a series for and about Saskatchewan's northern Indigenous peoples and their communities.

The Saskatchewan Association of Aboriginal Broadcasters, also known as SAAB, was founded in 1996 primarily through the efforts of MBC and the community station managers across the north. SAAB has grown into a large cooperative entity encompassing services for all Indigenous broadcast outlets in Saskatchewan.

== Content and delivery system ==
Today, MBC Radio provides a minimum of ten hours of Cree programming and ten hours of Dënesųłiné programming per week, and strives to integrate the languages into everything from special programs, remote event coverage, and contests, to commercial content and more.

The station carries hockey games involving the La Ronge Ice Wolves.

MBC has a digital satellite delivery system, thus eliminating reliance on ground distribution systems. MBC also facilitates and supports the growth and establishment of small community-owned low-power radio stations, and provides support and training services to them as needed.

== Frequencies ==
Call sign	Frequency	City of License
VF2332	97.3 FM	Beardy's and Okemasis' Cree Nation
CIPI-FM	96.5 FM	Beauval
CIWF-FM	95.7 FM	Big River First Nation
CJBL-FM	91.7 FM	Black Lake Denesuline First Nation (Formerly VF2298)
CHII-FM	89.9 FM	Brabant Lake
CIBN-FM	89.3 FM	Buffalo Narrows
CFCK-FM	103.9 FM	Canoe Lake Cree First Nation
VF2212	101.1 FM	Carrot River
CJCF-FM	89.9 FM	Cumberland House
CJLR-FM-2	91.9 FM	Denare Beach
CKBR-FM	92.7 FM	Dillon
VF2299	89.9 FM	Fond du Lac Dene Nation
CHGL-FM	94.9 FM	Green Lake
CILX-FM	92.5 FM	Île-à-la-Crosse
VF2300	96.5 FM	James Smith Cree Nation
CJBW	1330 AM	Jans Bay
CJBW-FM	89.9 FM	Jans Bay
CHPN-FM	89.9 FM	La Loche
CJLR-FM-7	89.9 FM	Meadow Lake
CHEC-FM	93.7 FM	Mistawasis Nêhiyawak/Leask
CJLR-FM-8	100.9 FM	Mistawasis Nêhiyawak
CJLR-FM-1	89.9 FM	Montreal Lake Cree Nation
CJLR-FM-6	95.5 FM	North Battleford
CPAT-FM	89.9 FM	Patuanak
CJAZ-FM	89.9 FM	Pelican Narrows
CFNK-FM	89.9 FM	Pinehouse Lake
CJLR-FM-3	88.1 FM	Prince Albert
CJLR-FM-4	90.3 FM	Regina
CIRN-FM	104.1 FM	Saskatoon
VF2301	89.9 FM	Shoal Lake Cree Nation
VF2142	97.9 FM	Uranium City
VF2456	89.3 FM	Weyakwin
CJLK-FM	91.9 FM	Wollaston Lake (Hatchet Lake Dene Nation)
CJLR-FM-5	92.9 FM	Yorkton

== See also ==
- List of radio stations in Saskatchewan
