= CHQX-FM =

Radio station in Saskatchewan, Canada

Coordinates: 53°03′27″N 105°50′35″W

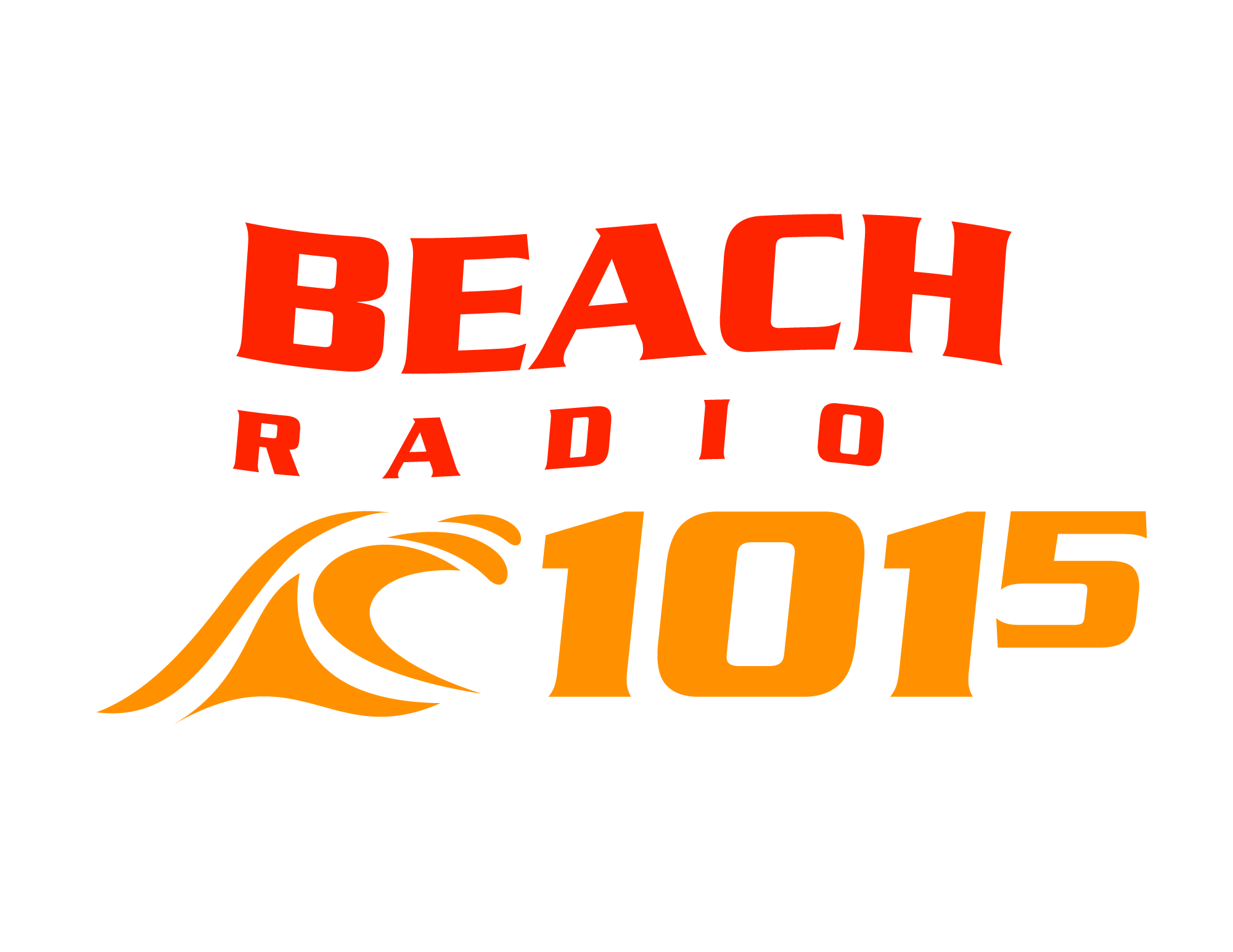
- Prince Albert, Saskatchewan; Canada
- Frequency: 101.5 MHz
- Branding: 101.5 Beach Radio

Programming
- Format: Classic hits

Ownership
- Owner: Jim Pattison Group
- Sister stations: CFMM-FM, CKBI

History
- First air date: 2001

Technical information
- Class: C1
- ERP: 100 kW
- HAAT: 178.6 metres (586 ft)

Links
- Webcast: Listen Live
- Website: beachradiopa.ca

CHQX-FM is a Canadian radio station that broadcasts a classic hits format at 101.5 FM in Prince Albert, Saskatchewan. The station is branded on-air as 101.5 Beach Radio and is owned by the Jim Pattison Group, who also owns the sister stations CFMM-FM and CKBI. CHQX's studios are located at 1316 Central Avenue.

The station received approval by the CRTC in 2000 and began broadcasting in June 2001.

On October 28, 2016, CHQX-FM rebranded to XFM 101.5 but kept the same format. In September 2020, the station changed its format to classic hits and rebranded to 101.5 Beach Radio.

== Rebroadcasters ==
Rebroadcasters of CHQX-FM
City of licence	Identifier	Frequency	Power	Class	RECNet	CRTC Decision
Big River	CHQX-FM-3	97.5 FM	1,200 watts	A	Query	2008-315
La Ronge	CHQX-FM-2	98.3 FM	53 watts	A1	Query	2005-122
Waskesiu Lake	CHQX-FM-1	90.5 FM	2,500 watts	A	Query	2002-459

== Current on air lineup ==
The Morning Show with Lew Harrison

Lew is a long-serving radio host in the Prince Albert area, known for incorporating humour and personal observations into his broadcasts.

Mid Days with Charlee Morgan

Charlee Morgan broadcasts 10am - 2pm. Join Charlee for 'That 80's Show' weekdays from 12-1pm.

Afternoons with Peter Michaels

Peter Michaels broadcasts from 2 – 6pm.
