= CFNS (AM) =

Former radio station in Saskatchewan, Canada

Converted to CBKF-2 (860 AM)
- Saskatoon, Saskatchewan; Canada
- Frequency: 1170 kHz

Programming
- Language: French
- Affiliations: Radio-Canada

Ownership
- Owner: Radio-Prairies-Nord Ltée.

History
- First air date: November 30, 1952
- Last air date: 1973

Technical information
- Power: 1,000 watts

CFNS was a Canadian radio station that broadcast in Saskatoon, Saskatchewan, from 1952 to 1973. A private affiliate of Radio-Canada, it was owned by Radio-Prairies-Nord Ltée and was the fourth French-language radio station in western Canada.

CFNS originally aired at 1170 AM and broadcast with 1,000 watts. It and CFRG in Gravelbourg were purchased by Radio-Canada in 1973 to become a rebroadcaster of Regina's new CBKF-FM. In 1975, the Canadian Radio-Television Commission (CRTC) approved CFNS to relocate to 860 kHz, change transmitter sites, and increase its power to 10,000 watts. The transmitter, which now has the call sign CBKF-2, still operates as a rebroadcaster of CBKF.
