= CJNE-FM =

Coordinates: 53°20′10″N 104°04′26″W

- Nipawin, Saskatchewan; Canada
- Frequency: 94.7 MHz
- Branding: CJNE The Storm

Programming
- Format: Classic and variety hits

Ownership
- Owner: Treana and Norm Rudock; (CJNE FM Radio Inc.)
- Sister stations: CITJ-FM

History
- First air date: 2002
- Call sign meaning: North East

Technical information
- Licensing authority: CRTC
- Class: B
- ERP: 14,800 watts (horiz.)
- HAAT: 58.6 metres (192 ft)

Links
- Website: cjnefm.com

CJNE-FM is a radio station in Nipawin, Saskatchewan. Owned by Norman H.J. and Treana J. Rudock, it broadcasts a broad oldies format.

The station received approval by the CRTC on January 10, 2002. In January 2020, it received approval for a second station on 89.5 FM, which will carry a country music format.

== Transmitters ==
Rebroadcasters of CJNE-FM
City of licence	Identifier	Frequency	Power	Class	RECNet	CRTC Decision
Cumberland House	CJNE-FM-1	89.9 FM, 97.5 FM	45 watts	LP	Query	
Carrot River	VF2212	101.1 FM	15 watts	LP	Query	
