= CKHD-FM =

Radio station in Assiniboia, Saskatchewan

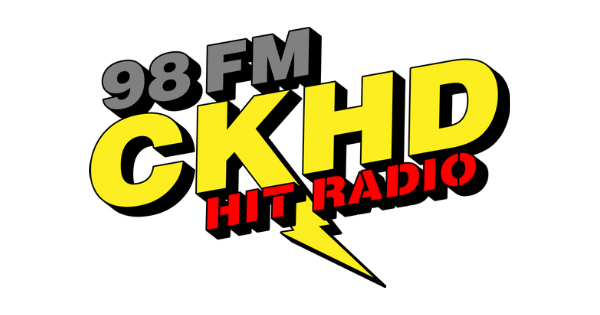
- Assiniboia, Saskatchewan; Canada
- Broadcast area: South-central Saskatchewan
- Frequency: 98.1 MHz (HD Radio)
- Branding: HitRadio 98 CKHD

Programming
- Format: Classic hits

Ownership
- Owner: Huber Radio, Ltd.; (Steven Huber)

History
- First air date: March 15, 2019
- Former call signs: CHOG-FM (2018–2019, CFGY-FM); CIAT-FM (2019–2023)

Technical information
- Class: C1
- ERP: 29,000 watts
- HAAT: 258 metres (846 ft)

Links
- Webcast: Listen Live
- Website: myassiniboia.ca

CKHD-FM is a radio station in Assiniboia, Saskatchewan. Owned by Huber Radio, it broadcasts a classic hits format. The station's studios are located on Third Avenue in Assiniboia, with their transmitting facility located near Willow Bunch.

== History ==
On July 26, 2018, Steven Huber, a former manager of Saskatoon Media Group, received CRTC approval for a new FM radio station in Assiniboia, Saskatchewan. The station would broadcast a country music format on 98.1 FM, and carry local news, agriculture, and community content. The CRTC received interventions from Golden West Broadcasting, Harvard Broadcasting, and Rawlco Communications, arguing that the proposed station would unduly compete with their stations in neighbouring areas (CHAB, CKRM, and CJME), and that its projected revenue would be insufficient to deliver the amount of local content it planned to produce. The CRTC dismissed these concerns, citing that the station's planned broadcast area had limited overlap with Regina and Moose Jaw-based stations, it was unlikely that the intervening stations had ever derived a significant amount of revenue from Assiniboia, and that the town had never had a local radio station before.

The station's transmitting facilities and tower were completed in January 2019. A test loop began airing on the station, launching as CIAT-FM, in January, with its official launch taking place on March 15, 2019. Around April 19, 2021, CIAT began broadcasting in HD Radio, becoming the first HD radio station in Saskatchewan.

On December 26, 2023, CIAT flipped to classic hits as HitRadio 98, changing its call letters to CKHD-FM.

== Coverage area ==
The station's coverage area includes most of the area within an 80 kilometres (50 mi) radius, serving a good portion of south-central Saskatchewan, mainly in an area from Val Marie to near Weyburn, and from an area across the Canada–United States border into northeastern Montana, also covering portions of Daniels, Sheridan and northern Valley Counties, northward to provide at least a rimshot signal into an area along Saskatchewan Highway 1 (Trans Canada Highway) between Regina and Moose Jaw.
