= CKJH =

Radio station in Melfort, Saskatchewan

Coordinates: 52°36′45″N 104°30′18″W

- Melfort, Saskatchewan; Canada
- Broadcast area: Central Saskatchewan
- Frequency: 750 kHz
- Branding: Beach Radio 750

Programming
- Format: Adult hits
- Affiliations: Melfort Mustangs; Saskatchewan Roughriders Radio Network

Ownership
- Owner: Jim Pattison Group
- Sister stations: CJVR-FM

History
- First air date: 2002

Technical information
- Licensing authority: CRTC
- Class: B
- Power: 25,000 watts

Links
- Website: beachradiosk.ca

CKJH is a radio station licensed to Melfort, Saskatchewan, Canada. Owned by the Jim Pattison Group, it broadcasts an adult hits format branded as Beach Radio. The station is headquartered alongside CJVR-FM in studios at 611 Main Street. CKJH 750 airs SJHL Melfort Mustangs games, as well as Saskatchewan Roughriders football games.

== History ==
In 1965, a group headed by Minno Walter Hodge received approval for a new AM station to serve the Carrot River Valley area, from Melfort. The station originally began broadcasting on October 8, 1966, at 1420 kHz as CJVR.

On February 22, 1995, CJVR received approval by the CRTC to change CJVR's frequency from 1420 to 750 kHz, which was vacated by CJWW in Saskatoon.

On March 1, 2002, the station changed call signs to its current CKJH, and changed formats from country to oldies/classic hits, with country moving to newly launched CJVR-FM.

On August 20, 2018, the Jim Pattison Group announced its intent to acquire Fabmar Communications pending CRTC approval. The sale made CKJH and CJVR-FM sisters to Jim Pattison Group's cluster in Prince Albert. Following the acquisition, in May 2019, the station flipped to adult hits as Beach Radio, re-focusing on hit music from the 1980s and 1990s.
