= CJVR-FM =

Radio station in Melfort, Saskatchewan

Coordinates: 53°03′25″N 104°36′36″W

- Melfort, Saskatchewan; Canada
- Frequency: 105.1 MHz
- Branding: 105 CJVR

Programming
- Format: Country

Ownership
- Owner: Jim Pattison Group
- Sister stations: CKJH

History
- First air date: October 8, 1966

Technical information
- Licensing authority: CRTC
- Class: C1
- ERP: 43 kW vertical 100 kW horizontal
- HAAT: 122.8 metres (403 ft)

Links
- Webcast: Listen Live
- Website: cjvr.com

CJVR-FM is a Canadian radio station broadcasting at 105.1 FM in Melfort, Saskatchewan, Canada. Owned by the Jim Pattison Group, the station airs a country format. It is located with sister station CKJH at 611 Main Street.

== History ==
The station received CRTC approval on December 7, 2001 and originally began broadcasting in FM on March 1, 2002. CJVR is currently a sister station of CKJH, which first went on the air in 2002. CJVR originally went to air on October 8, 1966 at 1420 AM. In 1995, CJVR moved to 750 AM, where it remained until March 1, 2002 when it switched to FM.

On November 1, 2018, the Jim Pattison Group acquired Fabmar Communications. The sale made CKJH and CJVR-FM sisters to Jim Pattison Broadcast Group's cluster in Prince Albert.

== Rebroadcasters ==
Rebroadcasters of CJVR-FM
City of licence	Identifier	Frequency	Power	Class	RECNet	CRTC Decision
Humboldt/Dafoe	CJVR-FM-1	100.3 FM	100,000 watts	C1	Query	
Waskesiu	CJVR-FM-2	106.3 FM	11,000 watts	B1	Query	
Carrot River	CJVR-FM-3	99.7 FM	45 watts	LP	Query	
Hudson Bay	CFMQ-FM	98.1 FM	38 watts	LP	Query	
