= CFMM-FM =

Radio station in Prince Albert, Saskatchewan

Coordinates: 53°03′27″N 105°50′35″W

- Prince Albert, Saskatchewan; Canada
- Frequency: 99.1 MHz
- Branding: Power 99

Programming
- Format: Contemporary hit radio

Ownership
- Owner: Jim Pattison Group
- Sister stations: CHQX-FM, CKBI

History
- First air date: January 31, 1982

Technical information
- Class: C
- ERP: 100 kW
- HAAT: 178.5 metres (586 ft)

Links
- Website: power99fm.com

CFMM-FM is a radio station in Prince Albert, Saskatchewan. Owned by the Jim Pattison Group, it broadcasts a contemporary hit radio format branded as Power 99. The station was previously owned by Rawlco Communications until its sale in 2014.

CFMM began broadcasting on January 31, 1982 and also has a rebroadcaster at 92.1 FM in Waskesiu Lake with the call sign CFMM-FM-1.
