= CJOE-FM =

CJOE-FM is a First Nations community radio station that operates at 99.5 FM in Witchekan, Saskatchewan, Canada.

The station is owned by Agency Chiefs Tribal Council.
