= CFRG-FM =

- Gravelbourg, Saskatchewan; Canada
- Frequency: 93.1 MHz
- Branding: Prairie FM 93.1

Programming
- Language: French
- Format: Community radio

Ownership
- Owner: Association communautaire fransaskoise de Gravelbourg

History
- First air date: 2003
- Call sign meaning: Formerly used by local station CFRG (1230/710 AM)

Technical information
- Licensing authority: CRTC
- ERP: 48 watts
- HAAT: 13.5 metres (44 ft)
- Transmitter coordinates: 49°52′17″N 106°33′10″W

Links
- Website: cfrg93.com

CFRG-FM is a French language radio station that operates at 93.1 FM in Gravelbourg, Saskatchewan. It retains the call sign formerly used by CFRG, a now-defunct private affiliate of Radio-Canada which aired in Gravelbourg from 1952 to 1975.

The station was licensed by the Canadian Radio-television and Telecommunications Commission in 2003.

The station is a member of the Alliance des radios communautaires du Canada.
