= Mistawasis =

Cree chief

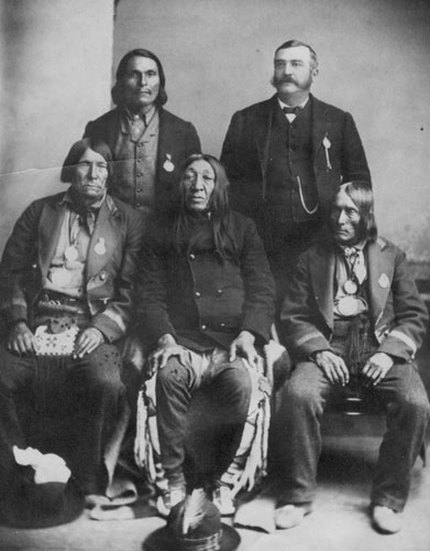
Cree chiefs and an interpreter in 1886, with Mistawasis seated at the bottom right. His ally, Ahtahkakoop, is seated at the bottom left.

Mistawasis (Cree: ᒥᐢᑕᐘᓯᐢ, meaning "Big Child"; born Pierre Belanger) was a Chief of the Sak-kaw-wen-o-wak Plains Cree, notable for his role as the leader of his people during the signing of Treaty 6 in 1876, to which he was the first signatory. Due to the dwindling buffalo population caused by excessive hunting, he was forced to look for new strategies to ensure the survival of his people and their culture. He believed the only way to save his people was to negotiate with the Canadian Government. As a result of his strong influence over the Cree people, he and his close ally, Ahtahkakoop, were able to argue successfully for the adoption of Treaty 6 by his fellow Cree. After the treaty was signed he remained an ally of the Canadian government until his death.

== Early life ==
The exact date of Mistawasis’ birth is disputed. It is estimated that he may have been born sometime between 1796 and 1813. He was born to a French father by the name of Bernard Belanger and a Nakoda woman, Kakakewachin. His birth name was Pierre Belanger, though in his adulthood he generally went by his Cree name, Mistawasis. He had five siblings, one of whom went by the same name as their father, Bernard Belanger. Mistawasis married Iskwesis Sitipinatowe and had at least two children. He later married Ann Awasis Mashe Nah Sho Wishk and had five children.

The Hudson's Bay Company (HBC) would utilize his prowess as a provider, commonly trading for buffalo meat in exchange for other goods. He also worked as a freighter for the HBC. He was known to some as Piwapiskomostos, a name meaning "Iron Buffalo". He received this name after a hunting accident where he was tossed from horseback onto the horns of one of the buffalo he was hunting, but escaped uninjured. The famous Cree chief Poundmaker is his maternal nephew.

== Disappearance of the Buffalo ==
The American buffalo's habitat once ranged in the general area from the American east coast, south-west to near Mexico, and northwards to Great Slave Lake in the Northwest Territories. They are the largest land mammals found on the continent of North America. The Buffalo's first contact with Europeans most likely occurred in the 1500s when they were spotted by Spanish conquistadors. Estimates suggest that at this time there was roughly 25-30 million wild buffalo living in North America. This number would dwindle severely to less than 100 in the American Great Plains states by the 1880s, with between 10-15 million dying over a ten-year period. In Canada the buffalo were most commonly hunted for the purpose of acquiring their skins or for preserving the animals meat for later ingestion in the form of pemmican. The fur trade was especially detrimental to populations as the hunters would, more often than not, prioritize acquiring the furs of the females over that of the males. This was due to their relative lightness as well as the ability to tan the furs at a quicker rate then the males. The majority of hunts were carried out in the winter, due to the buffalo's hair growing thicker in this time of the year. Winter happened to coincide with the buffalo's breeding season, meaning that many of the buffalo killed had a high possibility of being in some stage of pregnancy at the time. Being that buffalo only have one calf per year, the removal of large numbers of pregnant buffalo significantly weakened the animal's ability to naturally replenish its population.

=== Significance of Buffalo to Cree ===
One of the most important features of the Cree's way of life was the buffalo. It was a resource which was used extensively by the Cree for many different purposes. Its meat was used as food for personal sustenance as well as for trade with the Hudson's Bay Company. Its skin was used in the construction of living quarters. It was also used by the various indigenous groups of the region to make clothing, amounting to roughly two buffalo skins per person per year to be dedicated to the production of new clothing. The animal's bones were often used to create most of the tools used by the Cree people. Buffalo were important for trade with the Hudson's Bay Company as this trade was the only possible way for the Cree to acquire such useful goods as guns, as well as the ammunition needed to use the weapons. The Cree would hunt buffalo often without horses, to over come the difficulties associated with this they would often herd the animals into corrals so they could then kill them in a more manageable way.

=== Buffalo Wars ===
The sudden decrease in buffalo further destabilized the region by causing the Cree to trespass into Blackfoot territory in search of buffaloes. This trespassing would often lead to skirmishes between the two groups which could often end in loss of life on both sides. This fighting included numerous battles which resulted in the deaths of many Cree warriors. The Cree and Blackfoot would see peace in 1857, though it was short lived and war was restarted in 1860. The Cree would continue to use the war as a means to venture west, in search of the buffaloes which no longer existed in their homelands. The war would then continue in a sporadic and destructive nature until a permanent peace was finally signed in 1871. The war had caused extensive loss of life for the Cree and failed to result in the expansion of their territory to the buffalo rich areas of the west.

Area Covered by Treaty 6 (In Light Green)

== Treaty 6 ==
The sudden loss of an abundance of buffalo caused fear to spread throughout native communities in the 1870s. It was from this fear, and a hope for the future, that Mistawasis began to think about what he wanted his people's future to look like. It was from this perspective that Mistawasis and other leaders of the Cree communities began to believe that negotiation with the Canadian Crown Authorities would be their best course of action. One of the items Mistawasis hoped to acquire for his people was access to education. He perceived a European education as important to the future survival of his people and attempted to gain access to this through the Canadian government. He wanted to ensure that his people would be provided not only with school houses but also the teachers to operate and instruct in them. It was due to this belief that his peoples' way of life was disappearing along with his hope of an improved future that caused him to attend the negotiations at Fort Carlton in late August 1876. The British crown was represented by several men with British Treaty Commissioner Alexander Morris taking the leading role. Mistawasis argued for the treaty as a necessity for acquiring food by claiming that "Our way of living is gone, there are no more buffalo, we have to find a new way to feed our people." During much of the treaty negotiation process, Mistawasis' points of view were shared by his friend and ally Ahtahkakoop. Ahtahkakoop, like Mistawasis, was also concerned about the decrease in available buffalo. Ahtahkakoop was also quite interested in obtaining an education for his people, as well as help in gaining a better understanding of agriculture to fill the void in food left by the disappearance of the buffalo. Mistawasis and Ahtahkakoop were met with resistance by other Chiefs of the Cree nation. The Cree Chief Poundmaker disagreed with the ideas of Mistawasis. He was supported by other dissenting opinions of Chiefs Young Chipewyan, and The Badger. Poundmaker's main argument against the signing of the treaty was his belief that the Canadian government would only adhere to the Cree demands in exchange for hegemony over all of the Cree's lands, a price he did not want to pay. Mistawasis countered the argument of the chiefs who shared Poundmaker's outlook by challenging them to provide a better solution that what the Canadians were offering. Mistawasis further argued "…that the Great White Queen Mother has offered us a way of life when the buffalo are no more. Gone they will be before many snows have come to cover our heads or graves if such should be." He further argued that the queen would "stop the senseless wars among our people, against the Blackfoot, Peigans, and Bloods." He also believed that by allying himself with the Queen that he could restrict the sale of alcohol to his people, a goal that he was personally passionate about. On top of all this he argued that none of them could hope to survive in the face of the increasing flow of immigrants from the east on their own. Mistawasis ended his argument by declaring "I for one will take the hand that is offered." Ahtahkakoop shared the same sentiments as Mistawasis. After presenting his points to the other Chiefs, Mistawasis became the first of the men gathered to sign Treaty 6. The other Cree Chiefs were swayed by the word of Mistawasis and Ahtahkakoop and agreed to sign the treaty, which would from then on be known as Treaty 6. Treaty 6 would later be added onto by other members of the Cree nation at Fort Pitt in September 1876.

=== The provisions of Treaty 6 ===
When the initial stage of Treaty 6 was complete it contained many provisions which were favorable to the Cree people. It contained all rights and protections previously awarded in Treaties One through Five. This meant that the Cree were entitled to: monetary compensation/assistance from the federal government, the establishment of reserve lands which were off limits to outsiders, they would be fully provided with farm equipment, and finally that their Chiefs would receive uniforms and medals befitting their positions. In addition to these basic tenets it also contained some additional decrees. In response to the dwindling buffalo populations, the Cree were promised protection if they were to suffer from famine during their conversion to agriculture, in other words the Canadian Government agreed to send food relief in times of need. The other major provision added to Treaty 6 was that each Indian agent would maintain a fully stocked medicine chest to be utilized by the Cree in the event of any disease outbreaks.

== Later life ==
After the signing of Treaty 6, Mistawasis maintained a close relationship to the crown authorities. He used his power to attempt to stop the flow of alcohol into his people's territory, his work in doing so was one of the reasons the Canadian Government created the Northwest Mounted Police, to help in this venture. He is also responsible for the establishment of Mistawasis First Nation, which was named after him. Mistawasis would later allow a Presbyterian Mission to be established on his reserve. Mistawasis maintained a positive relationship with the Canadian Government during the 1885 Riel Rebellion, when he offered to defend the city of Prince Albert from any incursion by Riel. Mistawasis was in attendance at the unveiling of the Joseph Brant Memorial in 1886. During this visit to Ontario he met Prime Minister John A. MacDonald, and became enamored with the culture and technology of Canada.

== Death ==
Like his birth date, the exact date of Mistawasis’ death is also not known, although his final resting place is in the cemetery of the Presbyterian church built on his reserve. Dates of 1886, 1896, and 1903 have all been given as the true date. After his death he was succeeded as chief by George Dreaver, who remained chief until he died in 1938. George was then succeeded by his son, and Mistawasis' grandson, Joe Dreaver who served as Chief of Mistawasis First Nation for 25 years.

== Honours ==
The City of Saskatoon named its newest vehicular bridge the Chief Mistawasis Bridge on June 21, 2018.

== See also ==
- Mistawasis First Nation, namesake band government located in Leask, Saskatchewan
- Poundmaker, nephew and fellow Cree Chief
- Ahtahkakoop, close friend and ally in creation of Treaty 6
