= Mistawasis 103 =

Indian reserve in Saskatchewan, Canada

Coordinates: 53°09′46″N 106°47′47″W

- Indian reserve
- Mistawasis Indian Reserve No. 103
- Location in Saskatchewan
- First Nation: Mistawasis Nêhiyawak
- Country: Canada
- Province: Saskatchewan

Area
  - Total: 12,544.3 ha (30,998 acres)

Population (2016)
  - Total: 681
  - Density: 5.43/km^{2} (14.1/sq mi)
- Community Well-Being Index: 42

Mistawasis 103 is an Indian reserve of the Mistawasis Nêhiyawak in Saskatchewan. It is 68 kilometres (42 mi) west of Prince Albert. In the 2016 Canadian Census, it recorded a population of 681 living in 175 of its 180 total private dwellings. In the same year, its Community Well-Being index was calculated at 42 of 100, compared to 58.4 for the average First Nations community and 77.5 for the average non-Indigenous community.

== See also ==
- List of Indian reserves in Saskatchewan
