= CFRG (AM) =

Former radio station in Gravelbourg, Saskatchewan, Canada

Converted to CBKF-1 (690 AM)
- Gravelbourg, Saskatchewan; Canada
- Frequencies: 710 kHz and 1230 kHz

Programming
- Language: French
- Affiliations: Radio-Canada

Ownership
- Owner: Radio-Gravelbourg Ltée.

History
- First air date: June 1, 1952
- Last air date: 1973
- Former call signs: CFGR (1230 kHz, 1956–1973)

Technical information
- Power: 5,000 watts day (710 kHz); 250 watts night (1230 kHz)

CFRG was a Canadian radio station, which broadcast in Gravelbourg, Saskatchewan from 1952 to 1973. A private affiliate of Radio-Canada, the station was owned by Radio-Gravelbourg Ltée.

CFRG originally aired at 1230 AM, signing on June 1, 1952. On October 14, 1956, the station became a daytimer, moving to 710 during the day but retaining a nighttime signal on the original 1230 frequency with the call sign CFGR. The two stations broadcast with 5,000 and 250 watts, respectively.

The station and CFNS in Saskatoon were purchased by Radio-Canada in 1973 to become rebroadcasters of Regina's new CBKF-FM. The transmitter, which now has the call sign CBKF-1, is still in operation as a rebroadcaster of CBKF on 690 kHz.

The call sign was later revived on CFRG-FM, a francophone community radio station in Gravelbourg.
