= CKBI (AM) =

Radio station in Prince Albert, Saskatchewan

Coordinates: 53.2008°N 105.7538°W

- Prince Albert, Saskatchewan; Canada
- Frequency: 900 kHz
- Branding: 900 CKBI

Programming
- Format: Country
- Affiliations: Prince Albert Raiders

Ownership
- Owner: Jim Pattison Group
- Sister stations: CFMM-FM, CHQX-FM

History
- First air date: 1930

Technical information
- Class: A (Clear-channel)
- Power: 10,000 watts day; 2,800 watts night

Links
- Webcast: Listen Live
- Website: ckbi.com

CKBI (900 kHz) is a commercial AM radio station in Prince Albert, Saskatchewan. Owned by the Jim Pattison Group, it broadcasts a country radio format branded as 900 CKBI. The studios and offices are on Central Avenue in Prince Albert. CKBI is the broadcast home of the Prince Albert Raiders of the Western Hockey League, and also carries live broadcasts of Saskatchewan Roughriders CFL games.

By day, CKBI is powered at 10,000 watts non-directional. But at night, to reduce interference to other stations, it reduces power to 2,800 watts. The transmitter is on Gange Road at Tower Road in Red Deer Hill, Saskatchewan. CKBI is also heard on two FM rebroadcasters, one in Big River and one in La Ronge.

== History ==
CKBI began broadcasting as 10BI in 1930 on 250 metres. In 1934, 10BI became a commercial station, adopting the call sign CKBI and moving to 1210 kilocycles. CKBI has been operating at its current frequency of 900 kHz since 1941, coupled with the enactment of the North American Regional Broadcasting Agreement (NARBA). 900 AM is a Canadian and Mexican clear-channel frequency. CKBI and XEW Mexico City are the Class A stations on this frequency.

CKBI was a network affiliate of the Canadian Radio Broadcasting Commission from 1932 until 1936. It was an affiliate of CBC Radio until 1944 and then CBC Radio's Dominion Network from 1944 until 1962. At that point, CKBI became an independent station. During the 1970s it was owned by Central Broadcasting, Ltd., with studios on 10th Street in Prince Albert.

== Rebroadcasters ==
Rebroadcasters of CKBI
City of licence	Identifier	Frequency	Power	Class	RECNet	CRTC Decision
Big River	CKBI-FM-1	92.5 FM	1,200 watts	A	Query	2008-316
La Ronge	CKBI-FM	95.9 FM	53 watts	A1	Query	2005-121
