= Ahtahkakoop =

- Cree Head Chief
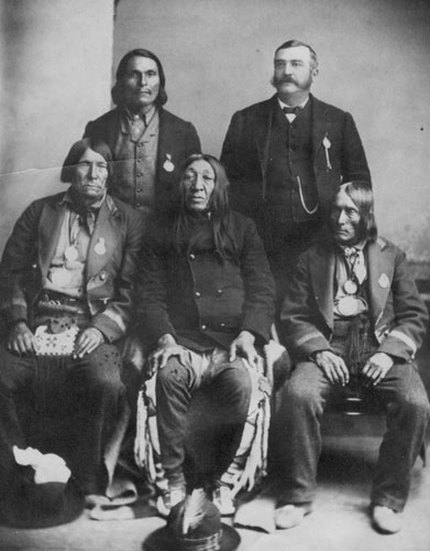
- Chief Ahtahkakoop seated bottom left
- Born: Ahtahkakoop (Starblanket) c. 1816; Saskatchewan River Country, Canada
- Died: 4 December 1896; Sandy Lake (present day Ahtahkakoop Cree Nation)
- Burial: St. Mark's Anglican Church, Ahtahkakoop, Saskatchewan.
- Spouse: Mary Nātowēw
- Father: Antoine Chatelain
- Mother: Okimawinotook

Ahtahkakoop (Cree: ᐊᑖᐦᑲᑯᐦᑊ, romanized: Atāhkakohp, "Starblanket", c. 1816 – 4 December 1896) was a Head Chief of the Plains Cree and presided over the House Cree (Wāskahikaniwiyiniwak) division of the Plains Cree people of northern Saskatchewan, who led his people through the transition from hunter and warrior during an era where their natural sources of livelihood and cultural foundations such as the Bison were subjected to mass decline, to farmers where his people would survive amidst mass starvation of Indigenous peoples across the great plains. Despite transitioning his lifestyle; Chief Ahtahkakoop was known for encouraging traditional ways of living in his community (even as they worshipped as Christians), and his continual adherence of traditional Cree ceremonies, medicines, and feasts such as the Bear Ceremony- gave way for his non-Christian people to remain safe of any religious discrimination or persecution.

He rose to be a respected and tactical leader of the Cree Nation in the latter part of the 19th century. At the onset of his leadership, the plains buffalo herds were abundant in the northern plains and parklands, providing greatly to the social, environmental, and economical balance vital to the survival of the Cree. By the 1860s, the buffalo were rapidly disappearing and with the arrival of the European settlers this balance became altered. Chief Ahtahkakoop understood that the ways of living that his band was used to needed to change in order for it and its future generations to survive. Together with his friend and fellow Chief, Mistāwasis ("Big Child"), he signed the 1876 Treaty 6 as the second signatory chief at Fort Carlton, Saskatchewan. By signing this treaty he agreed to relocate his band to a 67 square miles reserve at Sandy Lake, 45 miles northwest of present-day Prince Albert, Saskatchewan.

== Early life ==
Ahtahkakoop was born about 1816 in the Saskatchewan River country. Ahtahkakoop [Chatelain] was born to a French-Canadian father, Antoine Chatelain, and to a Cree woman, Okimawinotook. On the night of his birth, the young boy was said to have been born on a night where the stars blanketed the sky, and were more numerous and brighter than usual. He was thus given the name "Ahtahkakoop", the Plains Cree word for Starblanket- and his mother had wrapped the new born in a blanket sewn with pointed stars. He was one of five brothers. The remainder being named: Masuskapoe Chatelain, Sasakamoose Jacob Chatelain, Ahenakew David Chatelain, and Nāpēskis Chatelain. Ahtahkakoop's own descendants, and that of his brothers, are thought to be quite extensive although not completely compiled.

The third brother, Sasakamoose, whose name in English translates to "One Who Adheres"- was noted as a natural leader, and more respected medicine man than his brother Ahtahkakoop. Sasakamoose had been part of the mitewin, a secret and powerful medicine society; but, he was a small man and quick in both speech and anger. A beard and hunched back were his prominent features. The youngest of the brothers was Nāpēskis, a young and handsome warrior and fur-trapper, who had garnered the favor of the Hudson Bay Company and was given credit across Rupert's Land. In the summer of 1859, James Carnegie, the 9th Earl of Southesk, a renowned Scottish big-game hunter had taken up travel to the Herschel Area of South-western Saskatchewan. With the help of his guide, Nāpēskis, the Earl had killed several large game: mainly bison and plains Grizzly. At Kinnaird Castle in Scotland, some of the trophies credited to Nāpēskis and the Earl are still on display.

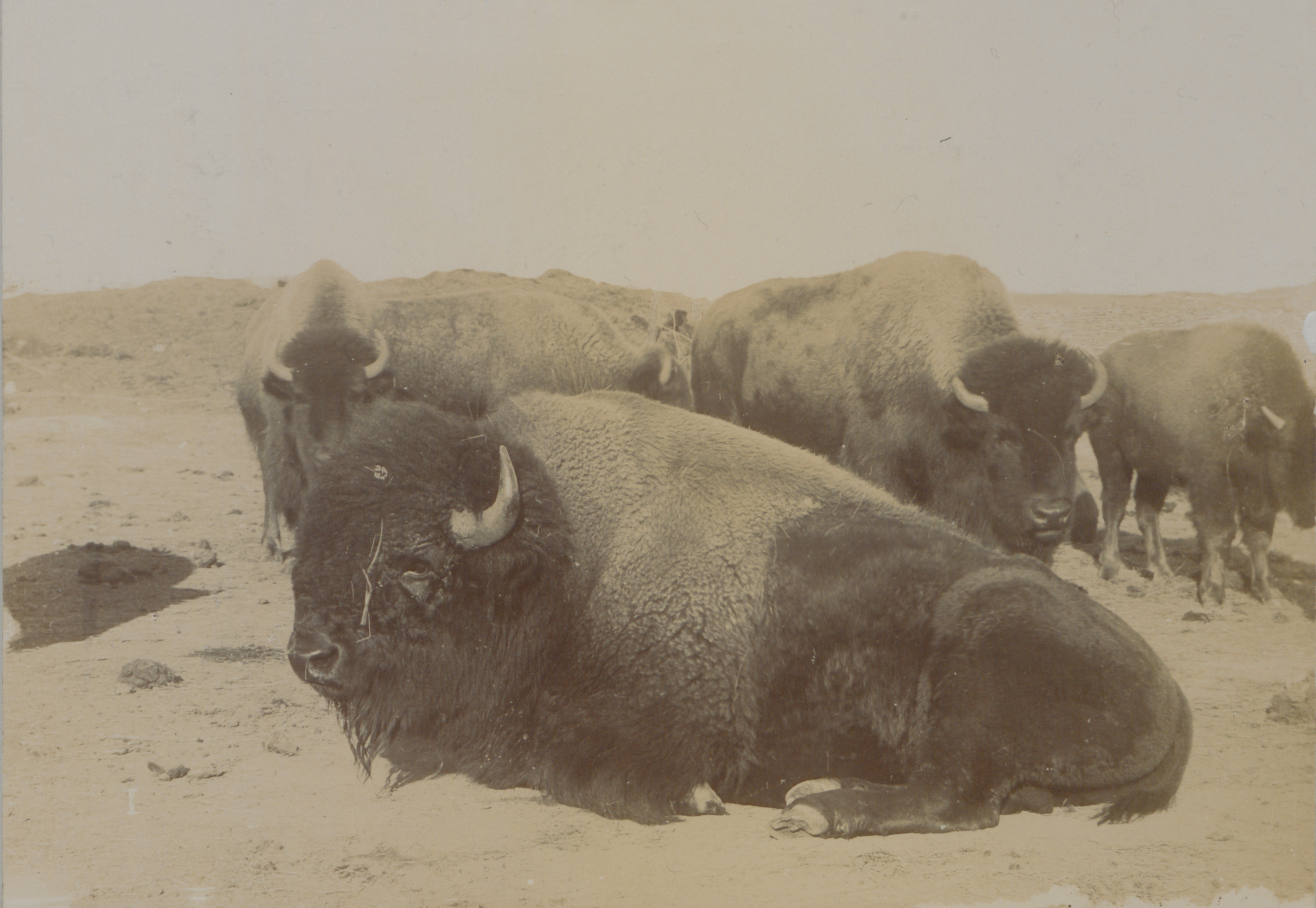
Canadian buffaloes grazing.

Ahathkakoop was brought up with the traditional values and way of life of the Plains Cree peoples. Thus, Ahtahkakoop was raised in a hunter-gatherer society. Every summer his family, in addition to other band members, would travel from their camps to the prairie grassland. Here they would hunt buffalo, and gather roots, herbs, and berries. The buffalo were especially important to the survival of Ahtahkakoop's people. Buffalo not only provided food but also their hides, which were used for a variety of purposes; from tipi covers and clothing to storage bags and cooking vessels. During the winter his people would separate back into their family groups and move to the parklands. Throughout the winter, in addition to buffalo, his family would hunt elk, moose, and deer. Once the weather began to warm towards the end of winter, birds such as geese and ducks would return to these lands, which would also be hunted. During this time sap from maple and birch trees would be gathered and turned into syrup and sugar.

Spirituality was also an important aspect of life for the Plains Cree. From a young age Ahtahkakoop would have been familiar with the stories of the Creator (māmawiwiyohtāwīmaw), his spirit helpers, and their place on Mother Earth. He also learnt about the various ceremonies, prayers, and songs involved in said ceremonies. When he was old enough Ahtahkakoop would have taken part in these ceremonies, such as being able to smudge and purify himself, pipe ceremonies, and sweat lodges. A very significant ritual that Ahtahkakoop would have taken part in during his early life was his vision quest. Around the age of 14, Ahtahkakoop would have left his family to seclude himself in the hills or forests around his camp. There, without food or water, he fasted in hopes of receiving a vision from the Creator. This ritual was an important part of puberty and a rite of passage.

== Ahtahkakoop the Chief ==
Throughout his adult life Ahtahkakoop was noted for his leadership skills. Even when he was still a young-adult, others noticed his knack for taking on responsibility and effectively leading his people. He often knew the best places to set up camps and where to hunt for buffalo, in addition to his impressive hunting skills. Most notable were his skills as a warrior. Many stories were told about his great war feats against other tribesmen. In many, such as a clash with the Blackfoot warriors, he was outnumbered yet was still able to lead his party to victory while keeping his men unscathed. This not only showed others his potential as an impressive leader, but also how the spirits favoured him and how powerful his spirit helpers were.

Although there is no certain date, it is believed that Ahtahkakoop was recognized as a chief no later than some time in the 1850s (although potentially earlier). Ahtahkakoop's band was part of the Fort People (wāskaahikaniyiniwak), so called for their close proximity to Fort Carlton. The territory of the Fort People spanned north, west, and south-west of Fort Carlton, although Ahtahkakoop's typical hunting grounds were located north of the Bad Hill (maci-waciy), north-west of modern-day Rosetown. The other major chief of the Fort People at this time was Mistawasis. Ahtahkakoop and Mistawasis were close allies and friends throughout their lives, often camping near one another and spending their summers hunting with each other's peoples. Their families were also closely linked. Ahtahkakoop's eldest son Kā-miyo-ahcahkwēw (Good Spirit) married Mistawasis' daughter Judique, and Ahtahkakoop's daughter Isabella married Mistawasis' eldest son Wēyatōkwapew (Lively Man). The two men also worked closely together when hunting and trapping for the Hudson's Bay Company, who recognised both of these men as prominent chiefs.

As a recognized chief, and a man of high rank, it was appropriate for Ahtahkakoop to take on multiple wives. He is known to have had at least three wives, one of which, named Mary, was the daughter of Nātowēw (although the names of the other women are unknown). These women would have been important in sharing the workload of the band as a whole in addition to organizing family matters. The women were all likely from other prominent bands, as interband marriages were pivotal in creating ties and alliances.

== John Hines ==
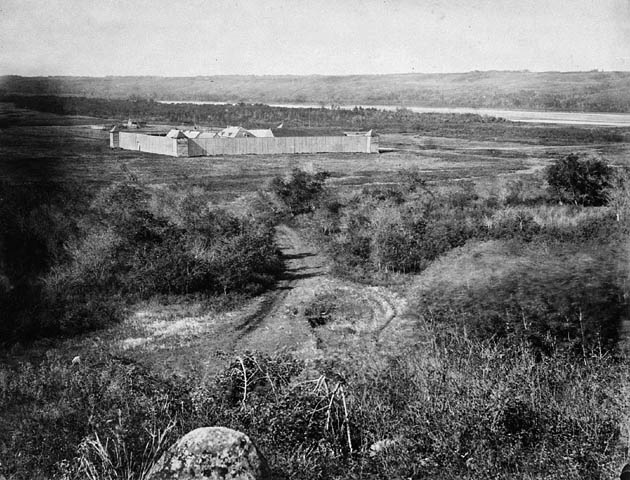
Fort Carlton, 1872.

In the summer of 1874, Ahtahkakoop and his band traveled to Fort Carlton to pick up supplies before heading out to hunt buffalo. While at the stop in Carlton he met the young missionary, John Hines, only in passing. However, Ahtahkakoop had been hoping to meet someone that could help his people transition and adapt to the changing world around them. The two men parted ways, with Ahtahkakoop leaving for the hunt and Hines setting out to build a new home for himself. However, when Ahtahkakoop heard that Hines was living nearby at a site on Whitefish Lake he decided to pay Hines a visit. During this visit Ahtahkakoop suggested to Hines that he should join them and move his settlement to Sandy Lake (yēkawiskāwikamāw) to be a minister there. In October of the same year, Hines moved his settlement to Sandy Lake, camping on Ahtahkakoop's land, which was much more appropriate for cultivation than his previous settlement sites.

This was not Ahtahkakoop's first encounter with missionaries. Prior to his encounter with Hines, Roman Catholic priests had visited Ahtahkakoop and his people. Ahtahkakoop had allowed for these priests to baptize his children. Ahtahkakoop had yet to be converted and baptized when Hines arrived at his camp. He was baptized 20 May 1877 along with his wife, who had been cautious about converting under the Church of England due to the fact that this church differed from that of her children. Ahtahkakoop not only introduced Hines and his religious teachings to his own people but also other bands, such as that of Mistawasis and Okinomotayew of Stony Lake. He stated that it was neither the work of Hines nor his own work that led to the spread of Christianity, but that rather people converted of their own accord.

Ahtahkakoop was under the impression that the previous missionaries under the Roman Catholic Church that visited his people would send somebody to educate his children, and others in his band, which they had stated they would. However, he was underwhelmed by these missionaries and was therefore excited for Hines to start educating his children and others at his camp. Therefore, Hines established a day school at Ahtahkakoop's site. He later set up additional day schools at other camps, one of which at Stony Lake which was run by one of Hine's previous pupils that had been taught at the school at Sandy Lake.

Ahtahkakoop was not only concerned about religious and practical teachings that Hines could provide but also agricultural teaching. Ahtahkakoop was aware of the changing economic world around him. With the drastic decrease in buffalo populations, which the Cree people had been so reliant on, Ahtahkakoop decided that turning to agriculture would provide the best and most stable economic income for the band. Therefore, Hines taught Ahtahkakoop and his people various agricultural tools, such as how to sow grain and plant gardens. At any given time, Ahtahkakoop's land had anywhere between 20 and 120 acres of land in use for agricultural purposes. In later years the Government of Canada praised Ahtahkakoop and Hines on their agricultural efforts.

== Treaty 6 ==
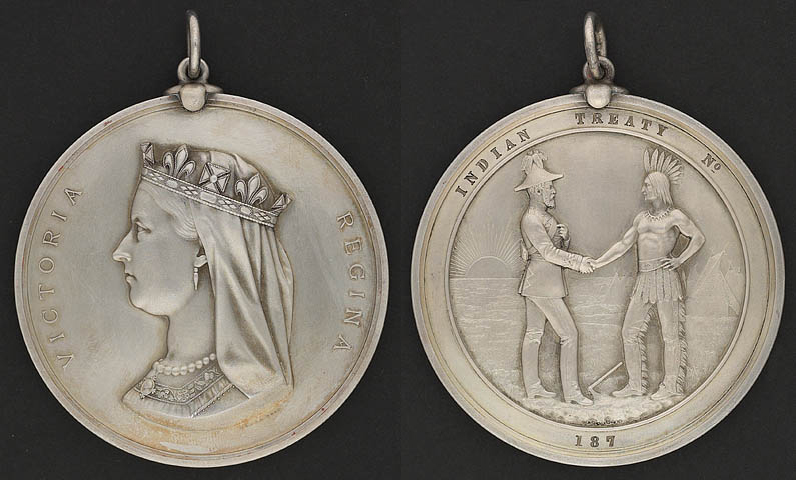
Engraved treaty medal presented to all chiefs that signed Treaty 6

On August 15, 1876, Ahtahkakoop, along with various other chiefs and officials met at Fort Carlton. On August 18, negotiations began and by August 23 Treaty Six had been signed first by Mistawasis, followed by Ahtahkakoop and 11 other chiefs, overseen by Lieutenant-Governor Alexander Morris. Representing the Wāskahikaniwiyiniwak (House Cree), Ahtahkakoop and his four headmen: Sah-Sah-Koo-Moos (Adherer), Benjamin (Thigh), Mee-Now-Ah-Chahk-Way (Good Spirit), and Kee-Sik-Ow-Asis (Sky Child) signed in agreement with the presented treaty terms. Each chief was presented with a medal and flag, and as head chiefs Ahtahkakoop and Mistawasis were presented with the chief's government uniform which included a gold-trimmed scarlet coat, a felt top hat, pants, a shirt, and a handkerchief. They were told that by accepting this uniform they became representatives on the kingdom and the Queen.

Ahtahkakoop, aware of the many changes that were taking place in the world around him (especially with the decline of the buffalo and increase of settler populations), saw the need to learn and embrace a new way of life. Ahtahkakoop was concerned not only for his own people, but all future generations to come, and so he saw the signing of the treaty and upholding of treaty terms as vital in the success of his people. Some other chiefs were not so quick to seek help from the government. Chiefs Poundmaker, Badger, and Young Chipewyan spoke out against signing the treaty and the dividing of land that would come along with it. However, after hearing speeches from Ahtahkakoop and Mistawasis were swayed by their opinions on why the treaty was important for the success of their people.

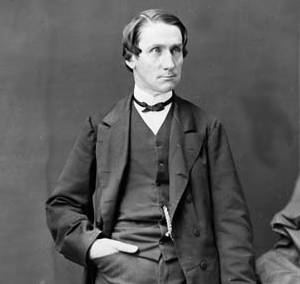
Lieutenant-Governor Alexander Morris

As a chief, Ahtahkakoop signed on behalf of all of his people who wished to peacefully share the land with settlers and the government. Therefore, Ahtahkakoop and his fellow chiefs bargained hard in order to receive as much help as possible for his people. Despite the fact the Ahtahkakoop and his people had already started to transition into relying on agriculture for food and income, he recognized that there needed to be some sort of safety net in place for his people in case times got tough. Therefore, a key part of the treaty was the inclusion of the famine clause and the medicine chest; resources that would be kept with an Indian Agent on each reserve in the case of famine and medical emergencies such as the outbreak of disease (such as smallpox and tuberculosis). The chiefs also asked for further support as they transitioned to an agricultural based life, such as more supplies and oxen to help ease this transition.

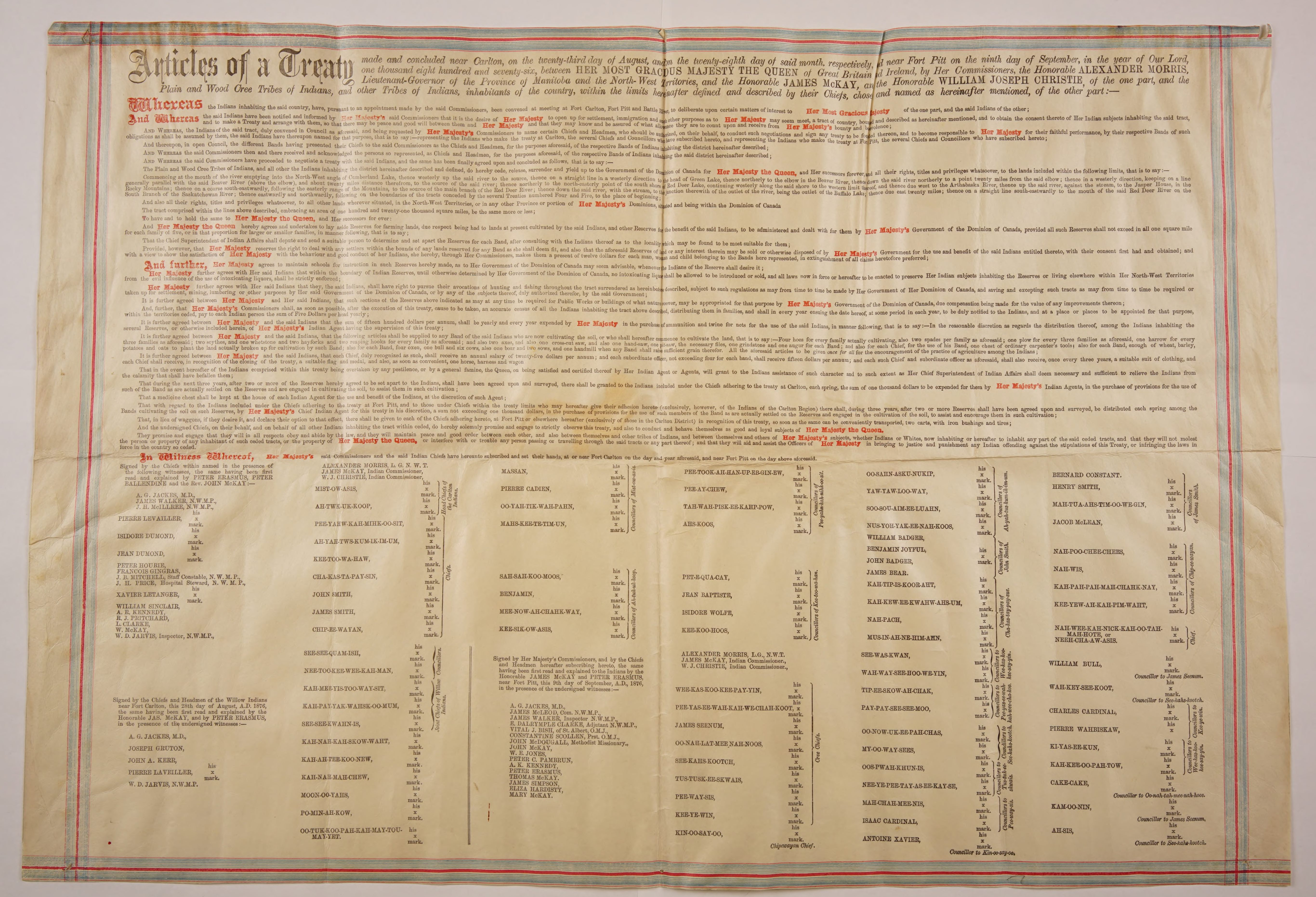
Presentation of the original Treaty 6 document, including names and signatures of Chief Ahtahkakoop and his headmen.

Despite the best intentions of Ahtahkakoop, there were misunderstandings in regards to the way in which the terms of the treaty would be upheld, due to differences in traditions between the Cree and the European settlers. Ahtahkakoop and the other chiefs understood that everything that was said and promised orally during the negotiations would be legitimate due to the fact that there was a sacred pipe present during the negotiations. However, the government officials understood that only what was written down in the treaty was legitimate, and because of the use of interpreters there was a miscommunication on both sides as to what was and was not included as part of the treaty. It is likely that when Morris arrived at Fort Carlton a significant portion of Treaty 6 was already written out. However, Ahtahkakoop and the other chiefs did successfully persuade Morris to include additional terms to the treaty. This was satisfactory to Ahtahkakoop, who knew that it was not possible to come to an agreement on every single issue that was presented by himself and the other chiefs.

== North-West Rebellion ==
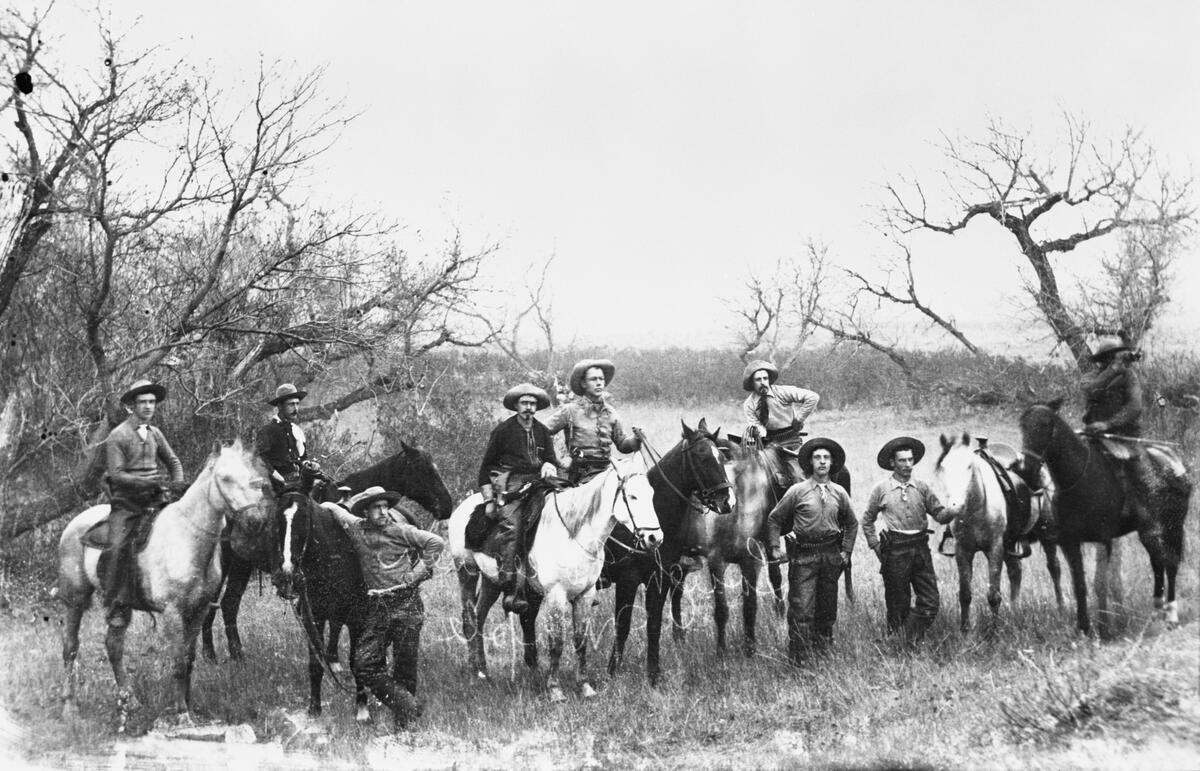
North-West Mounted Police on patrol during the North-West rebellion.

On March 20, 1885, Ahtahkakoop was met with a messenger from Fort Carlton at his door. He was informed by this messenger that the Métis had stolen arms and ammunition from storage, and had taken men as prisoners. Ahtahkakoop quickly got ready, picked up Mistawasis, and started his journey towards the fort. Upon their arrival at Fort Carlton the chiefs were met by many men, many of whom were from Prince Albert, that had shown up to help defend the fort. They were told that Louis Riel had gained power by creating his own provisional government, had organised a rebellion, and that he and Gabriel Dumont were demanding that the fort be turned over to them. Riel claimed that his actions were justified, as he believed that the government had failed to help the Métis in times of need.

Ahtahkakoop and Mistawasis were both questioned as to where their loyalties lay. Both men were set on honouring the treaty that they had signed together less than 10 years earlier. They stated that instead they would stay neutral during the events. Both men by this time were close to the age of 70, and despite their impressive past as warriors, they were doubtful that they would be much help on the battlefield. Therefore, they told officials that if they were unable to stop Riel and his men via force, they would take their people to Prince Albert to keep them safe. Happy with the men's promises to remain loyal, officials stated that they would provide protection and supplies to their people in the case of evacuation. Despite being asked multiple times by Riel to join his forces, the men stayed true to their words and remained neutral throughout this troubled time.

In 1886, John A. Macdonald invited prominent chiefs across western Canada to the unveiling of the Joseph Brant monument in Brantford, Ontario. Arriving in Ottawa, the Saskatchewan party (which included Ahtahkakoop) kept to their customs of sleeping on the floor instead of adopting the comfort of the offered bedstead. The Plains chiefs joined into a huge crowd of approximately 20,000 people at the unveiling of the Brant monument; when the Six Nations warriors began to war dance, the Cree leaders responded with their plains war whoops. On October 23, Prime Minister Macdonald welcomed the Cree chiefs; and it was Ahtahkakoop who in particular impressed Macdonald. Both men were approximately the same age, and through interpreter, the Prime Minister asked Ahtahkakoop if he could give his daughter a Cree name. The young Mary was a victim of hydrocephalus which had debilitated her physical strength and use. The dignified Chief stood up and offered that he'd keep the 'blanket' part of his name, and that she would receive the 'atahk' (the Star) part.

== Legacy ==
Ahtahkakoop died 4 December 1896 at the age of about 80 years, struck by what is believed to have been a heart attack while out on a walk with his grandson Pacī (James Starblanket). His son, Ka-miyoastotin (He Who Wears a Fine Hat), or Basil Starblanket, succeeded him as Chief of his father's band. He was buried on the reserve that was named after him. In 1993 a high school named after him was built on the Ahtahkakoop Reserve. The building of this school not only honours him but also other band members, which can be seen in the school's Hall of Achievement which displays the accomplishments of the Cree peoples.

== See also ==
- Ahtahkakoop First Nation
