= Mistawasis Nêhiyawak =

Cree First Nation in Leask, Saskatchewan, Canada

Coordinates: 53°09′46″N 106°48′10″W

Mistawasis Nêhiyawak First Nation
- Band No. 374pᑕᑌᑭᐱᒐᓇᒋ
- ᒥᐢᑕᐚᓯᐢ ᓀᐦᐃᔭᐘᐠ pᑕᑌᑭᐱᒐᓇᒋ
- People: Cree
- Treaty: Treaty 6
- Headquarters: Leask, Saskatchewan

Population (2005)
- On reserve: 1,036
- Off reserve: 1,135
- Total population: 2,171

Government
- Chief: Daryl Watson
- Council size: 6

Tribal Council
- Saskatoon Tribal Council

Website
- https://mistawasis.ca/

Mistawasis Nêhiyawak (Cree: ᒥᐢᑕᐚᓯᐢ ᓀᐦᐃᔭᐘᐠ mistawâsis nêhiyawak) is a Cree First Nation band government in Leask, Saskatchewan, Canada. Their settlement is roughly sixty-eight kilometres west of Prince Albert. The Nation has one reserve with an area of approximately 125.44 square kilometres. The First Nation has a registered population of 2171 people as of November 2005. Approximately 1036 members of the First Nation live on-reserve, and approximately 1135 live off-reserve.

== Name ==
The First Nation takes its name from the name of its first chief, Chief Mistawasis. Mistawasis, or "Big Child" in English, was the first person to sign Treaty 6 in 1876.

== Government ==
The First Nation is affiliated with the Saskatoon Tribal Council, along with six other First Nations.

== History ==
In May 2018, they became signatories to the Buffalo Treaty.

== Notable people ==
Notable people of the Mistawasis Nation include Marion Buller, a judge in British Columbia who heads the National Inquiry into Missing and Murdered Indigenous Women.

== Reserves ==
Mistawasis Nêhiyawak has reserved for itself 12 reserves:

- Mistawasis 103
- Mistawasis 103A
- Mistawasis 103B
- Mistawasis 103C
- Mistawasis 103D
- Mistawasis 103E
- Mistawasis 103F
- Mistawasis 103G
- Mistawasis 103H
- Mistawasis 103I
- Mistawasis 103J
- Mistawasis 103L
