= Media in Regina, Saskatchewan =

This is a list of media in Regina, Saskatchewan, Canada.

== Newspapers ==
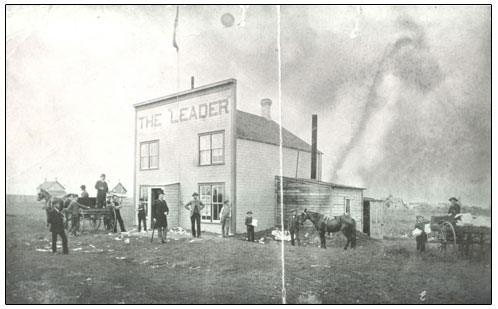
The Regina Leader, 1882

The Regina Leader was founded by Nicholas Flood Davin in 1883 and was the first Regina newspaper of record. Published weekly by the mercurial Davin, it came to national prominence during the trial of Louis Riel when Davin published several scoops and the Leader's articles were picked up by the national press. It merged with another local paper, the Regina Evening Post, and continued to publish daily editions of both before consolidating them under the title The Leader-Post. Other newspapers absorbed by The Leader-Post include the Regina Daily Star and The Province. It is now owned by Postmedia Network. The Regina Sun is published by the Leader-Post and distributed free of charge.

Prairie Dog was a free newspaper produced by a Saskatchewan worker co-operative. It was launched in February 1993 as a monthly and has appeared every two weeks as od October 1999. Prairie Dog is similar to alternative weeklies in other Canadian centres, such as Now (Toronto) and The Georgia Straight (Vancouver). In 2008, the Prairie Dog started a blog to get into web media. The September 30, 2025.

L'eau vive is a weekly newspaper established in 1971. The only French language newspaper in Saskatchewan, its offices are located in Regina; it serves the entire province's francophone community.

Metro was a commuter newspaper that started distribution in Regina on April 2, 2012, but which ceased operations from November 26, 2014.

== Radio ==
Frequency	Call sign	Branding	Format	Owner	Notes
AM 620	CKRM	620 CKRM	country music	Harvard Broadcasting	
AM 980	CJME	News/Talk 980	news/talk	Rawlco Communications	
FM 88.9	CKSB-FM-1	Ici Musique	public music	Canadian Broadcasting Corporation	French; rebroadcasts CKSB-FM Winnipeg
FM 90.3	CJLR-FM-4	MBC Radio	First Nations community radio	Missinipi Broadcasting Corporation	Rebroadcaster of CJLR-FM (La Ronge)
FM 91.3	CJTR-FM	AccessNow Radio 91.3	community radio	Access Communications	
FM 92.1	CHMX-FM	Play 92	rhythmic adult contemporary	Harvard Broadcasting	
FM 92.7	CHBD-FM	Pure Country 92.7	country music	Bell Media Radio	
FM 94.5	CKCK-FM	Jack FM	adult hits	Rawlco Communications	
FM 95.9	CIUC-FM	UCB Radio	Christian radio	UCB Radio Canada	
FM 96.9	CBK-FM	CBC Music	public music	Canadian Broadcasting Corporation	
FM 97.7	CBKF-FM	Ici Radio-Canada Première	news/talk	Canadian Broadcasting Corporation	French
FM 98.9	CIZL-FM	Z99	hot adult contemporary	Rawlco Communications	
FM 102.5	CBKR-FM	CBC Radio One	news/talk	Canadian Broadcasting Corporation	Rebroadcasts CBK
FM 104.9	CFWF-FM	104.9 The Wolf	active rock	Harvard Broadcasting	

== Television ==
OTA virtual channel (PSIP)	OTA actual channel	Access Cable	Call sign	Network	Notes
2.1	8 (VHF)	6	CKCK-DT	CTV	
9.1	9 (VHF)	4	CBKT-DT	CBC Television	
11.1	11 (VHF)	5	CFRE-DT	Global	
13.1	13 (VHF)	3	CBKFT-DT	Ici Radio-Canada Télé	
–	–	12	City Saskatchewan	City	Former provincial public broadcaster; airs educational television and cultural programming from 6 a.m. to 3 p.m.
–	–	7	–	Access7	Community channel for Access Cable subscribers

Satellite and cable systems available in Regina provide access to a wide range of specialty networks and American broadcast stations.

Now-defunct broadcasters that once served Regina included CPN, a network of specialty cable channels (including HBO) that served Saskatchewan in the late 1970s, and Teletheatre, a pay network that aired movies and original programming in the 1980s (later bought out by what would eventually become Movie Central).

== Internet ==
Regina had the largest free civic wireless internet program in Canada. The Downtown, Warehouse, 13th Avenue and University regions have government-sponsored wireless internet called Saskatchewan! Connected, which is also available in Saskatoon, Prince Albert and Moose Jaw.

Regina Saskatchewan! Connected was closed in September 2013
