= Media in Fort McMurray =

The following is a list of media in Fort McMurray, Alberta.

== Radio ==
Frequency	Call sign	Branding	Format	Owner	Notes
91.1	CKOS-FM	UCB Canada	Contemporary Christian music	United Christian Broadcasters Canada	
93.3	CJOK-FM	Country 93.3	Country	Rogers Radio	Broadcasts from Ontario, with city news from calgary
94.5	CFWE-FM-5	CFWE Radio Network	First Nations community radio	Aboriginal Multimedia Society	Rebroadcasts CFWE-FM Edmonton.
96.7	CKUA-FM-11	CKUA Radio Network	public broadcasting	CKUA Radio Foundation	Rebroadcasts CKUA-FM Edmonton.
97.9	CKYX-FM	Rock 97.9	Classic rock	Rogers Radio	Broadcasts from Edmonton, with city news from calgary
99.3	CBXN-FM	CBC Radio One	public news/talk	Canadian Broadcasting Corporation	Rebroadcasts CBX Edmonton.
100.5	CHFT-FM	100.5 Cruz FM	active rock	Harvard Broadcasting	Broadcasts hourly news updates during the mornings
101.5	CHFA-6-FM	Ici Radio-Canada Première	public news/talk	Canadian Broadcasting Corporation	French; rebroadcasts CHFA Edmonton.
103.7	CFVR-FM	Play 103	hot adult contemporary	Harvard Broadcasting	Broadcasts hourly news updates on weekdays and on play137.ca

== Television ==
CBC News has a reporter based in Fort McMurray. There are no local broadcast outlets or repeaters serving Fort McMurray, with television service in the area available only via cable.

CFRN-DT (CTV) operates a rebroadcaster on channel 12 from Ashmont that provides separate commercials and local news bulletins for Fort McMurray. It is only available on cable, as that transmitter's coverage area does not reach Fort McMurray.

CBXT-DT (CBC Television), CBXFT-DT (Radio-Canada) and CITV-DT (Global) are also available on cable and satellite. CBXT and CBXFT previously operated rebroadcasters in Fort McMurray before they were shut down in 2012.

ROGERS TV has one producer located in Fort McMurray out of the formally SHAW Cable building in Beacon Hill reporting on local news for their cable access channel.

== Newspapers, magazines and online news ==
=== Active ===
- Harvard Media broadcasts hourly news on Play 103.7 FM and 100.5 Cruz FM and posts daily articles on the radio station's websites.
- Fort McMurray Today (Launched as a daily in 1974 after Bowes Publishing bought the weekly McMurray Courier, Postmedia Network switched the newspaper to a weekly in 2018 and to an online-only outlet in February 2023)

=== Closed ===
- Snapd Wood Buffalo (Print edition ended in 2020, posted photos of community events to Facebook until January 2023)
- MyMcMurray.com (Local reporters laid off by Rogers Sports & Media in December 2020. The website now runs local press releases and news covered by reporters based in Calgary at CFFR)
- Fort McMurray CONNECT (Weekly newspaper founded in 2006, final edition published on December 22, 2016)
- McMurray Girl (Quarterly women's magazine that ran from Fall 2010 to Fall 2014)
- Fort McMurray Express (Weekly newspaper that ran from 1979 to 1994)
- McMurray Courier (Weekly newspaper that was first published on June 12, 1970 until it was sold to Bowes Publishing in 1974)
- Your McMurray Magazine (Magazine running entertainment, lifestyle and sponsored content articles founded in 2012 by Balsom Communications, publishes five times per year)
- YMM Parent Magazine (Family-focused lifestyle magazine operated by Balsom Communications)
