= CKIK-FM =

Radio station in Red Deer, Alberta

- Red Deer, Alberta; Canada
- Broadcast area: Red Deer County
- Frequency: 101.3 MHz
- Branding: Play 101.3

Programming
- Language: English
- Format: Rhythmic hot adult contemporary
- Affiliations: Premiere Networks

Ownership
- Owner: Harvard Media
- Sister stations: CKEX-FM

History
- First air date: July 24, 2009

Technical information
- Class: C1
- ERP: 26,000 watts average 50,000 watts peak
- HAAT: 161 metres (528 ft)
- Transmitter coordinates: 52.290°N 113.816°W

Links
- Webcast: Listen Live
- Website: play1013.ca

CKIK-FM (101.3 MHz, Play 101) is a radio station in Red Deer, Alberta. Owned by Harvard Media, it broadcasts a rhythmic hot adult contemporary format.

== History ==
The station received CRTC approval on June 1, 2009, and launched on July 24, 2009 as Kraze 101.3 with a CHR/Top 40 format.

Originally owned by L.A. Radio Group, the station was acquired by Harvard Broadcasting in December 2015.

CKIK-FM is a former callsign of a radio station in Calgary, which is known today as CFGQ-FM.

On January 15, 2024, the station flipped to rhythmic adult contemporary rebranding as Play 101, taking its branding and format from Edmonton sister station CKPW-FM.

== Former Logo ==
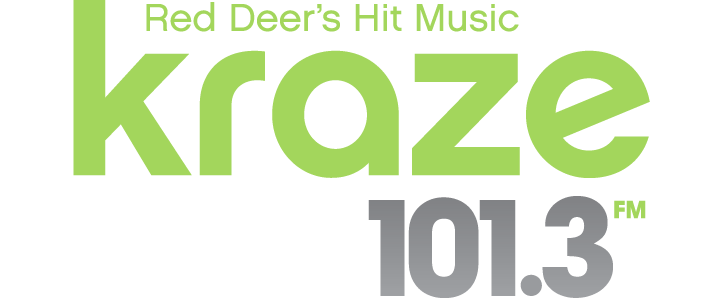
