= Terry Nylander =

Canadian politician

Terry A. Nylander

Member of Parliament for The Battlefords—Meadow Lake
- In office 1979–1980
- Preceded by: John Kenneth Gormley
- Succeeded by: Douglas Anguish

Personal details
- Born: 1 January 1946 (age 80) North Battleford, Saskatchewan, Canada
- Party: Liberal
- Profession: Farmer

Terry A. Nylander (born 1 January 1946) is a former Progressive Conservative party member of the House of Commons of Canada. Born in North Battleford, Saskatchewan, he was a farmer by career.

Nylander represented Saskatchewan's The Battlefords—Meadow Lake electoral district which he won in the 1979 federal election. After serving his only term, the 31st Canadian Parliament, he was defeated in the 1980 federal election by Douglas Anguish of the New Democratic Party.
