= CKEX-FM =

Radio station in Red Deer, Alberta

- Red Deer, Alberta; Canada
- Broadcast area: Red Deer County
- Frequency: 100.7 MHz
- Branding: X 100.7

Programming
- Format: Modern rock

Ownership
- Owner: Harvard Media
- Sister stations: CKIK-FM

History
- First air date: August 6, 2010
- Former call signs: CKRI-FM (2010–2018)
- Call sign meaning: Contains an X

Technical information
- Class: C1
- ERP: Vertical and horizontal polarization: 50,000 watts average 100,000 watts peak
- HAAT: 161 metres (528 ft)
- Transmitter coordinates: 52.256°N 113.813°W

Links
- Webcast: Listen Live
- Website: xreddeer.com

CKEX-FM (100.7 MHz) is a radio station in Red Deer, Alberta. Owned by Harvard Media, it broadcasts a modern rock format branded as X 100.7.

== History ==
CKRI-FM received approval by the CRTC on October 17, 2008, along with other new applications to serve Red Deer.

CKRI launched on August 6, 2010 as 100.7 The River, with an adult contemporary format. In August 2014, the station flipped to adult hits as 100.7 Cruz FM, which was modelled after its Edmonton sister station CKEA-FM. In January 2018, the station flipped to modern rock as X100.7, which is modelled after Calgary sister station CFEX-FM. The station changed its call letters to CKEX-FM.
