= John Kenneth Gormley =

Canadian politician

John Kenneth Gormley, KC (born August 2, 1957) is a Canadian radio talk show host, lawyer, and author.

== Life and career ==
He was born in Singapore, where his father was serving as a Captain with the Royal Army Medical Corps (RAMC) during the Malayan Emergency and his mother was a Lieutenant in the Royal Australian Army Nursing Corps (RAANC). Gormley's parents emigrated to Saskatchewan in 1960, settling in Battleford, northwest of Saskatoon.

He completed high school at St. Thomas College and was introduced to broadcasting as a teenager, spending a year working at radio station CJNB North Battleford. He later enrolled at the University of Saskatchewan and studied English. In 1977, Gormley began working at CKOM Saskatoon as a reporter and newsreader. He began hosting a talk show and later moved his show to CFQC Saskatoon.

Gormley was elected in the 1984 Canadian election to the House of Commons as Progressive Conservative MP for the electoral district of The Battlefords—Meadow Lake. In his last year as a Member of Parliament, he served as chairman of the Commons Standing Committee on Communications and Culture.

Defeated in the 1988 election, Gormley graduated law at the University of Saskatchewan College of Law in 1992 and is a member of the Law Societies of Saskatchewan and Alberta. He was named Queen's Counsel in 2011.

Since 1998, he had hosted Gormley, a radio show on CJME and CKOM; on November 8, 2023, Gormley announced that he would retire from the show after 25 years. His last show was on November 24, 2023. He was replaced by Evan Bray, Regina's former Chief of Police, who hosts The Evan Bray Show in the same 8:30am to 12:30pm time slot.

He has written two books. The first, Left Out: Saskatchewan's NDP and the Relentless Pursuit of Mediocrity, was published in 2010. The second, The Gormley Papers: I'm Right and You Know it, is a compilation of his weekly newspaper columns from the Saskatoon Star Phoenix and Regina Leader Post and was published in 2013.

During the 2015 terrorist attacks in Paris, Gormley tweeted "Me: Next guy in a Western democracy who chants 'Allah Ahkbar' we shoot. Wife: Don't be this way. #angry" He deleted the tweet shortly after and apologized. A group of professors at the University of Saskatchewan College of Law condemned Gormley for the tweet, and more than 2,000 people signed petitions calling for him to resign as a radio talk show host and newspaper columnist.

Parliament of Canada
Preceded by Doug Anguish	Member of Parliament for The Battlefords—Meadow Lake; 1984–1988	Succeeded by Len Taylor
