= CFMC-FM =

Radio station in Saskatoon

Coordinates: 52°10′54″N 106°23′14″W

- Saskatoon, Saskatchewan; Canada
- Broadcast area: Saskatoon metropolitan area
- Frequency: 95.1 MHz
- Branding: C95

Programming
- Format: Hot adult contemporary
- Affiliations: Premiere Networks

Ownership
- Owner: Rawlco Communications
- Sister stations: CKOM, CJDJ-FM, CKBL-FM

History
- First air date: 1964
- Former frequencies: 103.9 MHz (1964–1985)

Technical information
- Class: C
- ERP: 100,000 watts

Links
- Webcast: Listen Live
- Website: c95.com

CFMC-FM, known on air as C95, is a Canadian radio station in the city of Saskatoon, Saskatchewan. It shares studio space with sister stations CKOM and CJDJ-FM at 715 Saskatchewan Crescent West, also the home of Rawlco Radio's Corporate Offices.

== History ==
Originally known on air as CFMC FM103, the station was purchased by Rawlco Communications in 1985, moved to 95.1 MHz, and given the moniker C95.

In 2007, the station switched its format from hot adult contemporary to CHR/Top 40. This format change happened after Harvard Broadcasting was given approval to launch a CHR radio station (CFWD-FM). In December 2012, shortly after CFWD dropped its CHR format, CFMC began to start leaning more towards a hot adult contemporary format again, ultimately taking on an adult top 40 format.
