= CFQC =

CFQC may refer to:

- CFQC-DT, a television station (channel 8) licensed to Saskatoon, Saskatchewan, Canada
- CKBL-FM, a radio station (92.9 FM) licensed to Saskatoon, Saskatchewan, Canada, which held the call sign CFQC from 1923 to 2007
