= CHMC =

CHMC may refer to:

- Chaplain of the United States Marine Corps
- CIUP-FM, a Canadian radio station originally established as CHMC-FM
