= Mix 103.7 =

Mix 103.7 may refer to:

- CFVR-FM, a radio station in Fort McMurray, Alberta
- KKBJ-FM, a radio station in Bemidji, Minnesota
