= CKCK =

CKCK may refer to:

- CKCK-FM, a radio station (94.5 FM) licensed to serve Regina, Saskatchewan, Canada
- CKCK-DT, a television station (channel 2) licensed to serve Regina
