= Rhythmic =

Rhythmic may refer to:

- Related to rhythm
- Rhythmic contemporary, a radio format
- Rhythmic adult contemporary, a radio format
- Rhythmic gymnastics, a form of gymnastics
- Rhythmic (chart), Billboard music chart
