= Johnny Sandison =

Broadcaster in Regina, Saskatchewan

Johnny Sandison C.M., C.D.
- Born: John Edgar Sandison; November 22, 1925; Regina, Saskatchewan
- Died: August 17, 2004 (aged 78); Regina, Saskatchewan
- Occupations: Radio personality, Weather presenter
- Years active: 43
- Known for: Radio and television broadcasting
- Awards: Order of Canada

Johnny Sandison (1925–2004) was a broadcaster in Regina, Saskatchewan whose career spanned more than 40 years.

Born in Regina, Sandison served in the wartime Royal Canadian Navy and the Regina Fire Department before beginning his broadcasting career as an announcer/operator at CKRM Radio in 1953. In 1958 he replaced Fred Sear as the morning host on CKCK.

Sandison's popularity as the "Morning Mayor" skyrocketed on the powerful CKCK. His audience was estimated at its peak at 300,000 listeners—astonishing for a market the size of southern Saskatchewan.

In 1965 Sandison increased his visibility by becoming the evening weatherman on CKCK-TV. In the late 1970s, after recovering from heart surgery, Sandison left radio and became a full-time staffer of the television station, adding a daily talk show to his weather duties. At CKTV he formed a third of the highly popular Newservice 6pm team with news anchor James Allyn and sportscaster Dale Isaac.

Sandison volunteered with several organizations, and was a much-sought-after master of ceremonies.

In 1996 Sandison retired, and was given a boisterous televised send-off. He initially remained active, and continued to appear as a guest on TV and radio until his death. He was made a member of the Order of Canada in 1977.

Sandison Crescent in Regina's Walsh Acres subdivision is named after Johnny and his father John, a former deputy fire chief.

== Sources ==
- Sandison, Johnny. "Hi! I'm Johnny Sandison" Regina: Brigdens Publications, 1982. ISBN 0-919781-00-4
