= Rock 102 =

Rock 102 may refer to either of two radio stations:

- CJDJ-FM, Saskatoon, Saskatchewan, Canada
- WAQY, Springfield, Massachusetts, US
