= Stunting (broadcasting) =

Type of publicity stunt in radio broadcasting

Stunting is a type of publicity stunt in radio broadcasting, where a station—abruptly and often without advance announcement—begins to air content that is seemingly uncharacteristic compared to what is normally played.

Stunting is typically used to generate publicity and audience attention for upcoming changes to a station's programming, such as new branding, format, or as a soft launch for a newly established station. Occasionally, a stunt may be purely intended as publicity or a protest, and not actually result in a major programming change. Stunts often involve a loop of one or more songs, an interim format (such as the discography of a specific artist, Christmas music, and themes that would not be viable as a permanent format), or other unconventional presentations, sometimes including hints towards the station's new format or branding.

To a lesser extent, stunting has also been seen on television, most commonly in conjunction with April Fools' Day, or to emphasize a major programming event being held by a channel.

== Types of radio stunting and noted examples ==
=== Continuous loop ===
A station may stunt by repeating the same song, playlist, or other content on a continuous loop:

- The song(s) in question are commonly a clue towards the incoming format or branding
  - Such was the case in March 2014 when San Francisco Regional Mexican station KVVF/KVVZ stunted with a loop of "Hot in Herre" by Nelly for three days. This led into the stations' relaunch as rhythmic contemporary Hot 105.7. The stunt notably attracted mainstream media attention, with the hashtag "#nelly1057" being used to discuss the event on Twitter.
  - In late-June 2022, CKKS-FM in Greater Vancouver similarly faced mainstream media attention when it played a loop of "Killing in the Name" by Rage Against the Machine as part of its transition from hot adult contemporary Kiss to modern rock Sonic. The loop included staged segments of DJs discussing their repeated playing of the song, and "callers" either requesting "Killing in the Name", or being denied a request for a different song. These led to a false impression that its employees had commandeered the station to protest routine staffing changes associated with the format change.
- Often the song chosen for the loop does not pertain to either the old or new format:
  - In one of the oldest radio stunts recorded, WNOE-AM/New Orleans played "Shtiggy Boom" by The Nuggets nonstop for 58 hours and 45 minutes before the launch of its Top 40 format in early 1955.
  - In 1961, XEAK San Diego/Tijuana played "Mope-itty Mope" by The Bosstones for 72 hours straight before launching one of the first all-news formats in North American radio.
  - In 1962, WPOP/Hartford overnight DJ Joey Reynolds famously played the then-unknown record "Sherry" on his show on a loop for several hours. Although Reynolds was fired over the stunt, heavy airplay of the single by WPOP helped launch the career of the band that recorded it, The Four Seasons.
  - Bob Fass was known for repeatedly looping songs throughout his overnight show Radio Unnameable, most famously with Arlo Guthrie's "Alice's Restaurant" in the late 1960s. Fass's use of such stunts was a perverse form of pledge drive, often threatening to keep playing the songs over and over again until flagship station WBAI received a certain threshold of donations.
  - Several stations, including WMGV/Winneconne and WXMP/Peoria, have stunted with various versions of "Louie Louie" by Richard Berry. In 1983, as part of an escalating rivalry involving the song between DJs at Foothill College's KFJC and UC Berkeley's KALX, KFJC conducted a 63 hour stunt event in which it aired approximately 800 different versions of "Louie Louie".
  - In July 2013, the new Toronto radio station CIND-FM stunted with a loop of "Never Gonna Give You Up" by Rick Astley in a reference to the Rickroll meme, prior to its official launch as adult album alternative Indie 88.
  - Linder Radio Group is known for routinely using "Tie Me Kangaroo Down, Sport" by Rolf Harris as a filler stunt when changing a format on one of its stations.
- For four days before the July 8, 2012, relaunch of KOKE-FM/Austin — a station which popularized progressive country in the early 1970s, a live recording of Dale Watson's "Country My Ass" played in a continuous loop. This example of stunting is notable for the station-specific nature of the song's lyrics; Watson re-recorded the song for the occasion, adding a new coda in which he sings, "Now Austin's on track, 'cause KOKE-FM's back."
- In May 1990, the staff of Australian Broadcasting Corporation radio station Triple J staged an industrial action, after its news director was suspended for playing a clip of the N.W.A. song "Fuck tha Police" in a segment discussing its subject matter (despite the full song having been played by the station before without incident). During the action, Triple J played another N.W.A. song, "Express Yourself" (whose lyrics criticize censorship of rap music), 82 times in a row.
  - Triple J paid homage to the event during the April 30, 2014 relaunch of digital radio station ABC Dig Music as sister station Double J, which was preceded by a stunt loop of 13 different versions of "Express Yourself" (including the original recording, and covers of the song by Australian acts such as The Audreys, Darren Hanlon, and Wagons).
- WJMP/Kent, OH, in a protest over the Major League Baseball players' strike, continuously played two versions of "Take Me Out to the Ball Game" sunrise-to-sunset (the station operated only during daytime hours), for two months (and 57,161 total plays) from August to October 1994. The stunt merited WJMP an entry in the Guinness Book of Sports Records.
- "It's the End of the World as We Know It (And I Feel Fine)" by R.E.M. has been played on a loop on multiple occasions.
  - In May 1992, WENZ in Cleveland stunted with the song for 24 hours to mark its flip from CHR to modern rock as 107.9 The End. After being acquired by Radio One, WENZ reprised the stunt as a farewell to the format before it flipped to mainstream urban on May 14, 1999.
  - On April 16, 2012, after its sale by Family Radio to Merlin Media, WKDN/Philadelphia stunted with the song for several hours, in an apparent reference to the failed predictions by Family Radio owner Harold Camping that the Rapture would take place on May 21, 2011. Later in the day, the stunt shifted to nonstop airings of The Sean Hannity Show as Hannity @ 106.9, leading towards its relaunch as conservative talk iQ 106.9.
  - On December 21, 2012, in honor of the alleged Mayan apocalypse, modern rock station CFEX-FM/Calgary stunted with a loop of "It's the End of the World as We Know It (And I Feel Fine)" with no change in format. The song was interspersed with "Apocalypse Survival Tips" and "Get to Know a Mayan" sketches.
- Prior to its August 26, 2019 launch of a sports talk format affiliated with Fox Sports Radio, WDAS/Philadelphia stunted with a loop of the NFL on Fox theme music over the preceding weekend. The change in format was announced in advance of the flip.
- In a non-music example, the launch of Black Information Network—a chain of iHeartMedia news radio stations targeting African Americans—featured its initial stations playing a loop of speeches by prominent African Americans, mixed with sweepers promoting the launch date, and containing the tagline "Our side of the story is about to be told."
- Prior to the September 30, 2021 launch of an adult hits format, AAA station KTHX-FM in Reno stunted with instrumental jazz music mixed with sweepers stating that the station was "on hold".
- On Halloween in 2023, CKFT-FM/Fort Saskatchewan stunted with an hour-long loop of a sample from "Thriller" by Michael Jackson, consisting solely of Vincent Price saying "Your body starts to shiver." This stunt led into its switch to all-Christmas music for the holiday season, and the announcement of a new morning host.
- On May 12, 2025, as part of a transition from country to adult hits Big FM, CKHK-FM/Rockland and CHRC-FM/Hawkesbury both stunted with a loop of "Bye Bye Mon Cowboy" by Quebecois musician Mitsou. The song was a nod to the stations' new owners also operating a French-language radio station in Cornwall, Ontario, but the two stations would continue to broadcast in English.

=== Temporary formats ===
Occasionally a station dropping an old format will stunt with a transitional format. This can include songs based on specific themes (such as a single musician), songs that serve as hints towards the station's future format and branding, and novelties that would not be viable as a permanent format. In some cases (sometimes referred to as a "wheel of formats"), a station may cycle between multiple formats during the stunt until the new, permanent format launches, and may use the cycle to solicit feedback from listeners on the eventual format.

- As part of its February 1996 transition from country music to rhythmic contemporary WKTU, New York City's WYNY carried simulcasts of programming from several of its Evergreen Media sister stations, including WRCX/Chicago (to mark the occasion, Mancow Muller informed the expanded audience of Mancow's Morning Madhouse that there would be "no more goat-ropin' music" on WYNY, made jokes directed towards competitors WHTZ and WXRK, and pulled a prank on the latter's morning host Howard Stern), KKBT/Los Angeles, WLUP/Chicago, KIOI/San Francisco, and WXKS/Boston.
- In 2006, after its sale to new owners, KFYE in Kingsburg, California, dropped its contemporary Christian music programming for a stunt format it dubbed "Porn Radio", featuring songs with sexually-suggestive lyrics, and songs edited to include moaning sounds; on August 3, 2006, the station emerged as rhythmic adult contemporary Sexy 106.3. The station would hold a second publicity stunt in March 2007, promoting that KFYE would "say goodbye" on March 30: after the playing of "Say Goodbye" by Chris Brown, the ensuing event was revealed to be a change in call letters to KSXE to match the Sexy moniker (as celebrated by the playing of "Sexy MF" by Prince).
  - WLYK in Cape Vincent, New York (serving Kingston, Ontario) pulled a similar stunt when it transitioned to new operators in February 2023, replacing its outgoing Kiss CHR format with "The Pole" (a pun of the name of one of the station's new owners, Jon Pole)—a variety format which played pop, rock, and hip-hop music that one would hear at a strip club. The stunt notably attracted the attention of an actual strip club in Kingston. The station emerged as adult hits Lake FM on March 17, 2023.
- In May 2009, WSKS in Utica, New York, announced that due to "financial constraints", its contemporary hit radio (CHR) format would be replaced by a beautiful music format similar to what was broadcast on sister station WUTQ. The ensuing programming included staged scenes of station employees protesting the changes. The "new format," however, lasted for only two hours before WSKS management came clean, restored the CHR format, and confirmed the stunt was a way to promote the station's new lineup.
- As a publicity stunt for the program by local broadcaster Global, Toronto radio station CIRR-FM (which usually broadcasts a CHR format targeting the LGBT community) temporarily rebranded as Glee FM on April 12, 2010, adding music from the U.S. musical comedy-drama series Glee to its playlist. On August 16, 2010, British radio station Oxford's FM 107.9 held its own Glee FM stunt, leading into its August 18 relaunch as Glide FM.
- Over Memorial Day weekend in 2010, WJZX-FM/Milwaukee, Wisconsin, stunted as Tiger 106.9, featuring songs about cheating (in reference to an infidelity scandal involving golfer Tiger Woods). The station was expected to change to a top 40 format with the new call letters WNQW—with the new calls suggesting that its branding would involve the name "Now". However, competing station WQBW abruptly moved to introduce the same format and branding as 97.3 Radio Now, preventing WJZX from using the name. The station continued airing temporary formats (such as patriotic music and The Beatles' discography in alphabetical order), before settling on a permanent format in June 2010, as classic country station WZBK-FM (the station eventually adopted a rhythmic top 40 format in September 2012 as Energy 106.9).
- In 2011, WWWN/Chicago and WEMP/New York—which had recently been sold to Merlin Media—transitioned from alternative rock to all-news radio as FM News. As a transitional format, both stations aired a format branded as FM New, which featured adult contemporary music interspersed with news, traffic, and weather updates from personalities who would serve under the new FM News formats.
- Some stations have held temporary stunts focused on specific artists in honor of major concert tours making stops in their markets, with KSON in San Diego briefly rebranding as The All-New George-FM in January 2014 ahead of the January 31 date on George Strait's farewell tour The Cowboy Rides Away (promoting an increased amount of George Strait music, and on-air giveaways of merchandise and concert tickets), and San Francisco's KBAY announcing that it would temporarily rebrand as Tay Bay and play all-Taylor Swift music from July 28-29, 2023, in honor of The Eras Tour.
- On October 8, 2014, KROI/Houston ended its all-news format and began stunting as B92, playing only music by Houston-native Beyoncé. The stunt led into its relaunch as classic hip-hop Boom 92.
- KEGY/San Diego used an unbranded mainstream rock format as part of its transition from CHR to a new hot talk-oriented format in 2018. "Welcome to the Machine" by Pink Floyd was played at the top of each hour, which teased its eventual branding as The Machine.
- Multiple stations in the United States and Canada have stunted with Chinese music under the branding "Kung Pao", such as KDOG (which led into a flip to classic hits), WVHT (which led into its re-launch as CHR Hot 100), and CIGM (which led into its re-launch as CHR Hot 93.5).
- In connection to Donald Trump's presidency and the 2016, 2020, and 2024 presidential elections in the United States, multiple radio stations have stunted with songs directly related to both his presidency and campaigns under either both Donald and Trump brandings, such as WVWF (when it briefly stunted as Trump 105.1 and played songs that aimed directly to his campaign such as Pink Floyd's "Another Brick in the Wall"—in referenced to his border wall—in September 2016), and Hartford conservative talk station WDRC (which temporarily rebranded as Trump 103.3 to promote its new FM translator W277DT, before returning to its normal "Talk of Connecticut" branding).
- On March 8, 2021, in observance of International Women's Day, KJAQ/Seattle Jack FM temporarily rebranded as "Jill FM", and exclusively played music by women.
- In July 2021, Denver CHR station KPTT briefly aired all-Britney Spears music as Free Britney Radio (in reference to the Britney Spears conservatorship dispute) before re-launching its format as Hits 95.7.
- In 2022, KZIS/Sacramento (a new iHeartMedia station that had bought the frequency formerly used by Entercom's KDND) used a multi-stage stunt for a pre-launch period, beginning with loops of thematically-appropriate songs from May 4–9 (including the Star Wars theme on May 4, "Cinco de Mayo" by War, "Friday" by Rebecca Black, "Saturday in the Park" by Chicago, songs about mothers for Mother's Day, and "Manic Monday" by The Bangles), and then a sequence of listening-themed sweepers. From May 16–18, the station began to primarily carry listener-contributed messages and song requests sent via the "Talkback" feature on the iHeartRadio app. From May 19 to June 2, the station then entered into a wheel of formats, while also allowing listeners to vote for the station's future format. Following a final stunt format from June 3–8 featuring "the biggest party songs of the past 25 years", the station officially launched as the gold-based hot adult contemporary Kiss 107.9 on June 8.
- On October 31, 2024, WWKX in Woonsocket, Rhode Island dropped its urban contemporary format and began stunting with Halloween-themed music, followed by all-Grateful Dead on November 1 (Day of the Dead). At midnight, following the playing of the Grateful Dead song "Dire Wolf" to conclude the stunt, the station flipped to classic rock as 106 .3 The Wolf.
- On December 21, 2024, WQRR in Tuscaloosa, Alabama dropped its modern rock format and began stunting as Radio 101.7. The station implied that it had been hijacked by Russia, and initially played all-Taylor Swift music (some of which being covers of Swift songs in Russian), and then all-Michael Jackson music. The initial segment of the stunt would earn the station attention on social media, with users believing it was connected to the then-recent reports of unmanned drones flying across various cities in the United States. By December 23, the stunt format had been changed to 80s music, with Christmas-themed bumpers promoting a new format launching on December 24. At that time, the station relaunched as Christian adult contemporary 101.7 The River.
- There have been examples since 2025 of stunt formats specifically meant to promote a brand using AI-generated music. In June 2025, KLLI-HD2/Los Angeles stunted as 106.3 The Fizz as part of an advertising campaign by Suja-owned soft drink brand Slice; the format carried a loop of AI music with lyrics related to soda, produced in the styles of the 1980s and 1990s (billed as "yesterday's pop hits, that didn't exist until now"), with a chart show used as a framing device. The stunt lasted for a month, after which the channel flipped to an AI-automated K-pop format in July 2025.
  - In January 2026, KHYZ-HD2/Mountain Pass introduced a similar stunt format sponsored by Las Vegas internet service provider ISP.net (which has provided services to the station), carrying songs with Internet-related themes (such as the alternative song "Smells Like Low Latency", and reggae song "No Buffer No Cry"). The company promoted that the station would "cut the clutter, the DJ banter, and the art, leaving only what you crave: unadulterated, non-stop promotion of our service offerings." After the station's sale to ANCO Media Group, KHYZ-HD2 later flipped to Detox, a deep house-oriented spin-off of KHYZ's main dance radio format.
- In January 2026, after it was taken over by Hudson Valley Public Radio, WAXB in Ridgefield, Connecticut began stunting as 85X XPerimental Radio, with a backstory suggesting that the station had been hijacked by aliens. The format consists primarily of yacht rock, although it has also carried other types of music such as disco and smooth jazz; co-owner Bud Williamson stated that the format was intended to be temporary, but suggested that it could be kept going given "the number of listeners it is attracting with little promotion."
- On April 1, 2026, KKSR in Walla Walla, Washington held an April Fool's Day stunt during its morning show in which the station jokingly announced that it had been acquired by a Canadian company. The block consisted entirely of music by Canadian performers, with even traffic and weather reports using kilometers and Celsius units instead of miles and Fahrenheit.
- On June 5, 2026, WGFT in Youngstown, Ohio dropped its sports radio format and began stunting with songs about dogs as Taco 94.7, with a backstory suggesting that the station's studios had been commandeered by a Chihuahua named Taco. Three days later, the station emerged as classic hits Star 94.7.

=== Christmas music ===
The popular practice of radio stations playing all-Christmas music during the lead-up to (and occasionally the week after) Christmas Day has sometimes been used by stations as a transition period between formats. However, the ensuing format change can still occur before the end of the holiday season. Christmas music is sometimes used as a more blatant stunt format outside of the holiday season (in a similar spirit to ironic "Christmas in July" promotions).

- On November 17, 2017, Seattle country station KMPS flipped to Christmas music in defense of its former competitor and now-sister station, KKWF, following the merger of CBS Radio with KKWF's owner Entercom. While ostensibly for the holiday season, KMPS abruptly ended the all-Christmas programming on December 4, 2017, and flipped to soft adult contemporary. The following year, Entercom's Detroit station WDZH performed a similar flip from an outgoing CHR format to soft AC, with its transition period having lasted only three days.
- In April 2008, Saskatoon's new radio station CFWD-FM stunted with Christmas music as Santa FM prior to its official launch as CHR Wired 96.3. In December 2012, the station used Christmas music to transition from CHR to adult hits.
  - In April 2011, its Edmonton sister station CKEA-FM used a weekend of Christmas music to soft launch its new adult contemporary format Lite 95.7, promoting the new station's intent to play all-Christmas music during the holiday season.
- Duluth's WEBC used Christmas music as a transitional format in September 2015 when flipping from sports talk to classic rock, with the station initially implying that the Christmas format was permanent.
- Richmond's WURV aired 12 hours of "inappropriately early" Christmas music on October 7, 2015, as a satire of Christmas creep and stations trying to be the first in their market to play Christmas music.
  - WURV's sister station WJSR would notably conduct an unusually-long Christmas music stunt lasting from October 13, 2020 to March 4, 2021; the station had originally stunted with snippets of songs as "Short Attention Span Radio" from October 1. After just over five months of stunting in total, WJSR flipped to classic hits Awesome 100.9 on March 4, 2021.
- In October 2018, KBFF in Portland, Oregon briefly stunted with a Halloween-themed format as eviL 95.5 (an inversion of its typical branding Live 95.5), as a parody of all-Christmas formats.
- The success of KLO-FM's early format flip in October 2025, which was originally a stunt as the Salt Lake City area station changed formats between adult album alternative and adult contemporary, prompted the station to repeat the early format change in late September 2026, this time not as a stunt.

=== Other ===
- On January 7, 2019, country station KSED/Sedona began stunting with a speaking clock counting down to 6:00 a.m. on January 14, 2019. The stunt—which led into a rebranding with no change in format—prompted the Flagstaff Police Department to issue a statement clarifying that, despite concerns from residents, this was a promotional event with no harm intended.
- In 2018 and 2020, iHeartMedia used multiple stunts as part of its retooling and relaunch of CHR station KBKS-FM in Seattle.
  - In late-October 2018 approaching Halloween, the station dropped its on-air personalities, and began to air promos and sweepers implicating the end of its existing Kiss format. Later, the station began to interrupt songs with a demonic voiceover stating that "Kiss is dead", and air promos teasing an announcement on October 31. At that time, the station announced that it would revamp its on-air lineup with no change in format, explaining the prior stunt by stating that they were "dead serious" about finding "Seattle's funniest person" (with an accompanying contest soliciting viewer suggestions for new morning co-hosts).
  - In July 2020, KBKS announced that it had hired Jubal Fresh—the former co-host of KQMV's nationally syndicated morning show Brooke & Jubal in the Morning—to host a new morning show on the station. On August 3, 2020, the station temporarily rebranded as Jubal 106.1 to promote the impending launch of The Jubal Show, after which it adopted its new branding—Hits 106.1—on August 20, 2020 to coincide with its premiere.
- From March 27 to late-May 2020, CHR station WFLC/Miami, Hits 97.3, branded as Quarantine Radio in reference to the COVID-19 pandemic and Florida's stay-at-home order. The station maintained its existing format, but added commercial-free hours of dance music mixes ("Fit Mixes") at 9 a.m. and 5 p.m. daily. In late-May, the Quarantine Radio branding was dropped and the station promoted itself as being "under construction", before re-launching the Hits format on June 3, 2020 with a new on-air lineup.
- On August 25, 2025, CIMX-FM/Windsor began teasing a return to its heritage 89X modern rock format after having operated since 2020 as Pure Country. During the transition, the station maintained its country format without airstaff, but began airing sweepers voiced in Spanish (a reference to the spoken-word intro of "Stop!" by Jane's Addiction, which was the first and last song played by the original 89X) teasing a "revolution" and the return of "something familiar" at 8:08 a.m. on August 28. Prior to the advertised time, the station played a set of four Johnny Cash songs with relations to alternative music (including his cover of "Hurt" by Nine Inch Nails), after which the station flipped back to modern rock as a relaunched 89X.

=== Post-launch marathons ===
Another publicity stunt associated with format changes are marathons of commercial-free music for a length of time after the launch; this is done as a form of soft launch to help introduce the new format to listeners, as well as provide additional time for the station to build up their airstaff, programming, and advertising sales.

== On television ==
Cartoon Network has broadcast its share of stunts over the years, many on April Fools' Day. On April 1, 1997, the network aired a stunt where it had purportedly been taken over by Screwy Squirrel, and subsequently broadcast the Screwy Squirrel cartoon "Happy-Go-Nutty" for 12 hours straight. Numerous complaints were received about this particular event, generally fielded by Cartoon Network's cable providers, who had been left in the dark about the stunt. Later April Fools' Day stunts on Cartoon Network have included an 11 hour Cow and Chicken marathon in place of a scheduled Chowder marathon on April 1, 2009, and 14 hours of programming edited to have googly eyes on April 1, 2017.

Cartoon Network's Adult Swim block has held a number of their own April Fools' programming stunts, such as promoting a television premiere of Aqua Teen Hunger Force Colon Movie Film for Theaters before its theatrical release (but displaying it in a comically-small window over regularly scheduled programming), airings of the cult Tommy Wiseau film The Room, Adult Swim rebranding as a children's block called "Adult Swim Junior" (including airings of Aqua Teen Hunger Force and Rick and Morty episodes redubbed by children and edited to be family-friendly), a one-off revival of Cartoon Network's former action and anime block Toonami (which would later be rebooted under the auspices of Adult Swim), an airing of Toonami with programs in their original Japanese audio with subtitles (including Masaaki Yuasa's 2004 experimental film Mind Game) rather than an English dub, preceding an announced season 2 premiere of Smiling Friends with airings of several season 1 episodes recreated with live-action puppets, airing live-action recreations of Rick and Morty scenes in the style of theatrical plays prior to a trailer for its eighth season, and premiering an extended cut of the Smiling Friends season 3 episode "Curse of the Green Halloween Witch" with a longer version of the claymation horror film seen at the beginning of the episode. The stunts have sometimes included unannounced premieres of new and existing series, such as additional episodes of Perfect Hair Forever after its supposed series finale, the third season premiere of Rick and Morty, and an unannounced world premiere of the first episode of FLCL's third season before its second season had even premiered in the U.S. yet.

For 35 days in early-1998, Birmingham, Alabama's CBS affiliate WBMG—which had recently been acquired by Media General—stunted during some of the timeslots of its local newscasts with a clock counting down to a major relaunch of the station and its fledgling news department on February 5.

Nick Jr. Too, a sister to the British Nick Jr. channel, has occasionally aired long-term marathons of Peppa Pig, during which it has branded as "Nick Jr. Peppa". In a similar manner, Sky Sports has also temporarily rebranded some of its multiplex channels as "pop-up" channels to devote them to major events, such as The Ashes series in cricket (Sky Sports Ashes), the PDC World Darts Championship (Sky Sports Darts; in 2015, this used the Sky Sports F1 channel, since Formula One was in its off-season), and golf's Open Championship (Sky Sports The Open). In January 2019, Sky Sports Action was temporarily renamed "Sky Sports USA", with programming focusing on the National Basketball Association (coinciding with the playing of the NBA Global Games series in London), and the National Football League playoffs and Super Bowl LIII.

At least three networks have used stunting-type events prior to their formal launches: G4, for example, aired a 7 day long game of Pong before its formal debut on April 24, 2002. This stunt would later be referenced by the network's sign-off on December 31, 2014, as well as in the video announcing its 2021 return. MLB Network aired a continuous loop of baseball highlights and promos as a "soft launch" in the weeks before its formal debut on January 1, 2009. Canada's Sun News Network employed an on-screen countdown clock graphic in the hours before its April 18, 2011, launch.

Since 2017, one of ESPN's networks has stunted as "ESPN8: The Ocho" on or near August 8 (8/8), carrying a marathon of programming featuring obscure or unconventional sporting events and competitions such as chess boxing, disc golf, dodgeball, esports, Highland games, kabaddi, lawn mower racing, mini-golf, and roller derby among others. The stunt pays tribute to a fictitious ESPN channel of the same name portrayed in the 2004 sports comedy film DodgeBall: A True Underdog Story (nicknamed "The Ocho", in reference to ESPN2 being nicknamed "The Deuce" on launch), which is promoted as broadcasting events that are "almost a sport". The stunt was originally held on ESPNU—a channel that normally carries college sports events during the academic year, but moved to ESPN2 beginning in 2018. The film itself has sometimes been screened as part of this lineup as well. ESPN would later launch an ESPN8-branded free ad-supported streaming television (FAST) channel devoted to such content.
