= KZLJ-LP =

- La Junta, Colorado; United States
- Frequency: 102.1 MHz
- Branding: 102 ZLJ

Programming
- Format: Rhythmic AC

Ownership
- Owner: Daniel Hyatt

Technical information
- Licensing authority: FCC
- Facility ID: 196583
- Class: LPFM
- Transmitter coordinates: 37°58′38″N 103°33′05″W

Links
- Public license information: LMS

KZLJ-LP (102.1 FM) is a radio station broadcasting a rhythmic AC format. Licensed to La Junta, Colorado, United States, the station is currently owned by Daniel Hyatt.

== History ==
The station went on the air on March 28, 2014, after running a test signal for a few days.
