= Rawlco Communications =

Canadian radio station group based in Saskatoon

Rawlco Radio Ltd.
- Industry: Communication
- Headquarters: Saskatoon, Saskatchewan, Canada
- Website: www.rawlco.com

Rawlco Radio Ltd. is a media company based in Saskatoon, Saskatchewan, Canada. The company is the sole proprietor of six radio stations in the province of Saskatchewan.

The Rawlco Radio Corporate Office is just south of Downtown Saskatoon, overlooking the South Saskatchewan River, at 715 Saskatchewan Crescent West. This complex also is home to their local stations; CKOM, CFMC and CJDJ.

== History ==
Started in 1946 by Edward Rawlinson (1912–1992), a Saskatchewan resident born in Qu'Appelle, it became one of Canada's most successful broadcasting companies. Rawlinson had a fascination for radio broadcasting, and in 1946 he purchased CKBI radio in Prince Albert, Saskatchewan, and soon after became chairman of his own company, Rawlco Communications. The company went on to acquire prominent radio and television stations in Prince Albert, North Battleford, Meadow Lake, Saskatoon, Regina, Edmonton and Calgary.

In 1975, Rawlinson's two sons, Gordon and Doug, both from Prince Albert, entered the business. The Rawlinson brothers formed Rawlco Radio, a Saskatchewan-based radio broadcasting company. During the next twenty years, Rawlco Radio purchased and operated radio stations in Saskatchewan, Alberta, and Ontario. In partnership with Maclean-Hunter, Rawlco was also part of the original consortium licensed to launch NCN, a Canadian country music video channel which was later renamed CMT.

In 1999, they consolidated holdings to focus only on Saskatchewan and Alberta radio. It currently operates seven stations in the provinces.

Ed Rawlinson died in 1992, and his son Gordon is now CEO of Rawlco Radio.

On July 10, 2014, Rawlco announced that it would sell its radio station clusters in Edmonton (CKNO-FM and CIUP-FM), North Battleford/Meadow Lake (CJNB, CJCQ-FM, CJHD-FM and CJNS-FM), and Prince Albert (CKBI, CFMM-FM, and CHQX-FM) to The Jim Pattison Group. On November 26, 2025, Rawlco announced that it would sell CHUP-FM to Stingray Radio, ending the company's presence in Alberta. The next day, Rawlco announced that it would acquire CKBL-FM from Saskatoon Media Group.

== Radio stations ==
=== Saskatchewan ===
- Regina - CIZL-FM, CJME, CKCK-FM
- Saskatoon - CFMC-FM, CJDJ-FM, CKOM, CKBL-FM

=== Former ===
- Calgary, Alberta - CFFR, CJAQ-FM, CHUP-FM
- Edmonton, Alberta - CIUP-FM, CKNO-FM
- Prince Albert - CFMM-FM, CHQX-FM, CKBI
- Meadow Lake - CJNS-FM
- Ottawa, Ontario - CFGO, CJMJ-FM
- North Battleford - CJCQ-FM, CJNB, CJHD-FM
- Toronto - CISS-FM
