= CJGX =

Radio station in Yorkton

Coordinates: 51°12′23″N 102°20′10″W

- Yorkton, Saskatchewan; Canada
- Broadcast area: Eastern Saskatchewan, Western Manitoba
- Frequency: 940 kHz
- Branding: GX94

Programming
- Format: Country
- Affiliations: Melville Millionaires, Saskatchewan Roughriders, Swan Valley Stampeders, Yorkton Terriers

Ownership
- Owner: Harvard Media
- Sister stations: CFGW-FM

History
- First air date: August 19, 1927
- Call sign meaning: "Grain Exchange"

Technical information
- Class: B
- Power: 50,000 watts day; 10,000 watts night

Links
- Website: gx94radio.com

CJGX (branded as GX94) is a Canadian AM radio station, licensed to Yorkton, Saskatchewan. It broadcasts on an assigned frequency of 940 kHz with 50,000 watts power daytime, and 10,000 watts nighttime. The station airs a country format with studios at 120 Smith Street East in Yorkton.

The station reports news, weather, and sports at the top of each hour, and broadcasts ice hockey games involving the Melville Millionaires, the Yorkton Terriers of the Saskatchewan Junior Hockey League and Swan Valley Stampeders of the Manitoba Junior Hockey League. CJGX also carries live broadcasts of Saskatchewan Roughriders games.

== History ==
CJGX signed on August 19, 1927, after the Winnipeg Grain Exchange created a radio station to provide farmers in Saskatchewan and Manitoba with the latest grain and livestock prices.

At first, the station exclusively broadcast grain and livestock pricing before gradually adding other programming. The primary motivator behind the switch was a change in ownership and the establishment of government-controlled grain marketing in 1934.

In 2025, CJGX and its sister station, FOX FM, won a Western Association of Broadcasters (WAB) gold medal for Community Service Radio (market size under 150,000) for their "Save the Terriers" campaign to secure the future of the Yorkton Terriers Junior A hockey team.
