= KSBH =

- Coushatta, Louisiana; United States
- Broadcast area: Natchitoches, Louisiana; Coushatta, Louisiana
- Frequency: 94.9 MHz (HD Radio)
- Branding: 94.9 The River

Programming
- Language: English
- Format: Country
- Subchannels: HD2: Classic hits "92.3 The Fox"

Ownership
- Owner: Elite Radio Group; (KSBH, L.L.C.)
- Sister stations: KNOC

History
- First air date: July 7, 1993
- Last air date: January 2026

Technical information
- Licensing authority: FCC
- Facility ID: 4956
- Class: C3
- ERP: 25,000 watts
- HAAT: 100 meters (330 ft)
- Transmitter coordinates: 31°51′34.5″N 93°13′0.6″W
- Translator: HD2: 92.3 K222AO (Natchitoches)

Links
- Public license information: Public file; LMS

KSBH (94.9 FM, "94.9 The River") was a radio station licensed to Coushatta, Louisiana. The station broadcast a country music format in Natchitoches and Red River Parishes. The station's studio was located in Natchitoches and its transmitter was in Powhatan. The station was owned by Elite Radio Group.

In January 2026, owner Bill Vance surrendered the licenses for his stations—KSBH and KNOC—following an inquiry by the Federal Communications Commission over the operational status of KNOC.

== KSBH-HD2 ==
KSBH's second HD Radio channel carried a classic hits format, branded "92.3 The Fox" in reflection of its simulcast on FM translator K222AO (92.3).

Call sign	Frequency	City of license	FID	ERP (W)	Class	Transmitter coordinates	FCC info
K222AO	92.3 FM	Natchitoches, Louisiana	140632	120	D	31°45′47.6″N 93°3′47.6″W	LMS
