= CFGW-FM =

Radio station in Saskatchewan, Canada

Coordinates: 51°25′47″N 102°27′23″W

- Yorkton, Saskatchewan; Canada
- Broadcast area: Eastern Saskatchewan; West-Central Manitoba
- Frequency: 94.1 MHz
- Branding: 94.1 Cruz FM

Programming
- Format: Adult hits
- Affiliations: Premiere Networks

Ownership
- Owner: Harvard Media
- Sister stations: CJGX

History
- First air date: July 1, 2001

Technical information
- Class: C1
- ERP: 100,000 watts
- HAAT: 175.5 metres (576 ft)

Links
- Website: cruzyorkton.com

CFGW-FM (94.1 FM, "94.1 Cruz FM") is a radio station in Yorkton, Saskatchewan. Owned by Harvard Media, it broadcasts an adult hits format. Its studios are colocated with sister station CJGX at 120 Smith Street East in Yorkton.

Via rebroadcasters in Wapella, Saskatchewan and Swan River, Manitoba, the station has coverage across the Saskatchewan–Manitoba border region in eastern Saskatchewan and west-central Manitoba.

== History ==
CFGW was licensed in 2000, and began broadcasting on July 1, 2001. It initially broadcast a hot adult contemporary format, as "The Fox" (later amended to "Fox FM").

In May 2024, the station flipped to adult hits under Harvard's "Cruz FM" brand, as used by Saskatoon sister station CFWD-FM.

== Rebroadcasters ==
- CFGW-FM-1 95.3 - Dauphin-Swan River, Manitoba
- CFGW-FM-2 102.9 - Moosomin, Wapella and Whitewood, Saskatchewan
