= CFVR-FM =

Coordinates: 56°41′03″N 111°19′47″W

- Fort McMurray, Alberta; Canada
- Frequency: 103.7 MHz
- Branding: Play 103.7

Programming
- Format: Rhythmic adult contemporary
- Affiliations: Premiere Networks

Ownership
- Owner: Harvard Media
- Sister stations: CHFT-FM

History
- First air date: January 14, 2008

Technical information
- Class: B
- ERP: vertical polarization: 22,000 watts horizontal polarization: 50,000 watts
- HAAT: 81.4 metres (267 ft)

Links
- Webcast: Listen Live
- Website: play1037.ca

CFVR-FM (103.7 FM, "Play 103.7") is a radio station in Fort McMurray, Alberta. Owned by Harvard Media, it broadcasts a rhythmic adult contemporary format.

== History ==
The station received approval by the CRTC to operate at 103.7 FM in November 2006, and officially launched on January 14, 2008 as Mix 103.7 with a hot adult contemporary format.

On January 15, 2024, the station flipped to rhythmic adult contemporary as Play 103, with a format and branding based on its Edmonton sister station CKPW-FM.
