= CHFT-FM =

Coordinates: 56°41′03″N 111°19′47″W

- Fort McMurray, Alberta; Canada
- Frequency: 100.5 MHz
- Branding: 100.5 Cruz FM

Programming
- Format: Active rock

Ownership
- Owner: Harvard Media
- Sister stations: CFVR-FM

History
- First air date: June 16, 2008
- Call sign meaning: Classic Hits/Fort

Technical information
- Class: B
- ERP: vertical polarization: 23,000 watts horizontal polarization: 50,000 watts
- HAAT: 81.4 metres (267 ft)

Links
- Webcast: Listen live
- Website: cruzradio.com

CHFT-FM (100.5 FM, "100.5 Cruz FM") is a radio station in Fort McMurray, Alberta. Owned by Harvard Media, it broadcasts an active rock format.

== History ==
Initially owned by Newcap Radio, the station received CRTC approval on November 15, 2006 and launched on June 16, 2008 branded as 100.5 K-Rock.

Although they had studios in downtown Fort McMurray the stations programming originated from the Steele Communications Studios at 391 Kenmount Road, St. John's, NL until 2013 when the station was in transition to sell to Harvard Media.

On December 10, 2009, the station applied to the CRTC to increase their effective radiated power from 25,000 watts to 50,000 watts and received approval on June 9, 2010.

On November 7, 2013, the CRTC approved an application by Harvard Broadcasting to acquire CHFT from Newcap Radio.

On December 26, 2013, at 10 a.m, CHFT was rebranded as 100.5 Cruz FM, modelled after sister station CFWD-FM in Saskatoon.

In 2024, CHFT won the award for best small-market radio station in all of Canada for a city with a population of under 100k at the Canadian Music and Broadcast Industry Awards.

On February 24, 2025, after stunting with a 16 hour loop of "Never Gonna Give You Up" by Rick Astley, the station flipped to active rock while maintaining the Cruz FM branding, with the station temporarily billed as The All-New Cruz FM. Harvard stated that the repositioning was meant to appeal to Fort McMurray's median young adult population and at-work listening, especially in workplaces (such as the oil sands) with limited access to online music (such as music streaming and internet radio). This change is specific to the Fort McMurray market, and other Cruz FM stations will maintain their existing mainstream rock positioning.

In November 2025, CHFT's programming and music director Jordan Keating won Music Director of the year at the Canadian radio awards 2025. https://www.cruzradio.com/2025/12/18/fort-mcmurrays-cruz-fm-adds-another-national-canadian-radio-award/
