= KNOC =

- Natchitoches, Louisiana; United States
- Broadcast area: Natchitoches Parish
- Frequency: 1450 kHz
- Branding: 95.9 The Bounce

Programming
- Language: English
- Format: Gold-based rhythmic hot AC

Ownership
- Owner: Elite Radio Group; (North Face Broadcasting, L.L.C.)
- Sister stations: KSBH

History
- First air date: March 1, 1947
- Last air date: January 2026
- Call sign meaning: Natchitoches

Technical information
- Licensing authority: FCC
- Facility ID: 8518
- Class: C
- Power: 1,000 watts
- Transmitter coordinates: 31°45′47.6″N 93°3′47.6″W
- Translator: 95.9 K240EY (Natchitoches)

Links
- Public license information: Public file; LMS
- Webcast: Listen live
- Website: 959thebounce.com

KNOC (1450 AM, "95.9 The Bounce") was a gold-based rhythmic hot adult contemporary radio station. Licensed to Natchitoches, Louisiana, United States, the station served Natchitoches Parish and surrounding areas. The station was owned by Elite Radio Group. Its programming was also heard on translator station K240EY (94.9 FM).

On January 7, 2019, KNOC changed its format from urban adult contemporary to classic country, branded as "95.9 Kix Country". On November 13, 2025, KNOC changed its format from classic country to rhythmic throwbacks, branded as "95.9 The Bounce".

The Federal Communications Commission (FCC) cancelled the station's license on January 26, 2026. Owner Bill Vance surrendered the licenses for his stations—KNOC, K240EY, and KSBH—following an inquiry by the FCC over KNOC's operational status. The inquiry was prompted by a complaint that claimed KNOC and K240EY had been silent for at least two years; it also alleged that K240EY had been originating programming, despite KNOC itself remaining off the air, since November 2025.
