= Douglas Anguish =

Canadian politician

The Honourable Douglas Anguish ECS

Member of the Saskatchewan Legislative Assembly for North Battleford
- In office 20 October 1986 – 1 July 1996
- Preceded by: Myles Morin
- Succeeded by: Jack Hillson

Member of Parliament for The Battlefords—Meadow Lake
- In office 18 February 1980 – 4 September 1984
- Preceded by: Terry Nylander
- Succeeded by: John Kenneth Gormley

Personal details
- Born: 8 July 1950 (age 75) Meadow Lake, Saskatchewan, Canada
- Party: New Democratic Party
- Spouse: Mona Jane Karpenko (m. 6 November 1971)
- Profession: consultant, political assistant

Douglas Keith Anguish (born 8 July 1950) was a Canadian politician, consultant and political assistant. He served as a New Democratic Party member of the House of Commons of Canada.

He was elected at The Battlefords—Meadow Lake electoral district in the 1980 federal election and served in the 32nd Canadian Parliament. He left politics following the 1984 federal election in which he was defeated by John Kenneth Gormley of the Progressive Conservative party.

In the 1986 Saskatchewan provincial election, Anguish won the North Battleford riding for the provincial NDP. He was re-elected there in 1991 when the NDP's Roy Romanow became premier. Anguish was re-elected in 1995, then resigned from provincial politics and his cabinet position on 1 July 1996 to seek other work.
