= CFWD-FM =

Radio station in Saskatchewan, Canada

Coordinates: 52°10′28″N 106°26′04″W

- Saskatoon, Saskatchewan; Canada
- Broadcast area: Saskatoon metropolitan area
- Frequency: 96.3 MHz (FM)
- Branding: 96.3 Cruz FM

Programming
- Format: Mainstream rock

Ownership
- Owner: Harvard Media

History
- First air date: April 9, 2008
- Call sign meaning: "Wired" (former branding)

Technical information
- Class: C1
- ERP: 96,000 watts
- HAAT: 179.1 metres (588 ft)

Links
- Webcast: Listen Live
- Website: cruzfm.com

CFWD-FM (96.3 FM, "96.3 Cruz FM") is a radio station in Saskatoon, Saskatchewan. Owned by Harvard Media, it broadcasts a mainstream rock format.

== History ==
Licensed to Harvard Broadcasting on May 28, 2007, the station was originally scheduled to launch on 92.3 FM. However, it applied for a change of frequency to 96.3 FM, citing the potential for third-adjacent interference to 92.9 The Bull.(now The Grid)

On April 9, 2008, the new station signed on and began stunting with Christmas music as Santa FM in preparation for its official launch; the campaign also featured publicists parading the streets of Saskatoon in Santa Claus costumes. On April 11, 2008 at 3:00 p.m., the station officially launched with a CHR/Top 40 format branded as Wired 96.3.

Wired 96.3 was known for their publicity stunts like smoking salvia on-air

On November 16, 2012, Harvard laid off CFWD's on-air personalities and announced that Wired 96.3 would sign off that night at midnight; at that time the station returned to Santa FM for the holiday season in preparation for another change in format scheduled for December 26. On December 26, 2012, at Noon, CFWD was relaunched as 96.3 Cruz FM, carrying an adult hits format. The Cruz FM branding would later segue to a mainstream rock positioning, and be extended to other Harvard stations in Edmonton, Fort McMurray, and Yorkton.
