= Bob Arnold =

English voice actor (1910–1998)

George Richard Arnold (27 December 1910 – 27 August 1998), better known as Bob Arnold, was an English voice actor who played the part of Tom Forrest in the long running BBC radio series The Archers from 1951 to 1997. Arnold was born in Asthall, Oxfordshire on 27 December 1910. He died from liver failure at his daughter's home in Salisbury, Wiltshire, on 27 August 1998, at the age of 87.
