= CFEX-FM =

Radio station in Calgary, Alberta, Canada

Coordinates: 51°04′21″N 114°15′38″W

- Calgary, Alberta; Canada
- Broadcast area: Calgary Metropolitan Region
- Frequency: 92.9 MHz
- Branding: X92.9

Programming
- Format: Modern rock

Ownership
- Owner: Harvard Media

History
- First air date: January 1, 2007
- Call sign meaning: Contains an X

Technical information
- Class: C
- ERP: 100 kWs
- HAAT: 342.2 meters (1,123 ft)

Links
- Website: x929.ca

CFEX-FM (92.9 FM, "X92.9") is a radio station in Calgary, Alberta. Owned by Harvard Media, it broadcasts a modern rock format. CFEX's studios are located along the Red Mile on 17 Avenue SW in Calgary, while its transmitter is located on Old Banff Coach Road in western Calgary.

As of Summer 2022, CFEX is the 7th-most-listened-to radio station in the Calgary market according to a PPM data report released by Numeris. CFEX competes primarily with Corus classic alternative station CFGQ-FM and Bell Media's active rock CJAY-FM.

== History ==
In 2006, the CRTC approved an application by Harvard Broadcasting for a new FM radio station in Calgary, which would broadcast an alternative rock format.

The station officially launched at midnight on January 1, 2007 as X92.9, hosting a free New Year's Eve concert at the University of Calgary's Mac Hall featuring Hot Hot Heat. Owing to the group's mixed reception, the station promoted a "No Nickelback Guarantee" in comparison to its main rival, CJAY-FM. Its stance against the band has gained national attention on several occasions, including its endorsement of a petition for the NFL to not have the band perform at halftime during a Thanksgiving game in Detroit in November 2011.

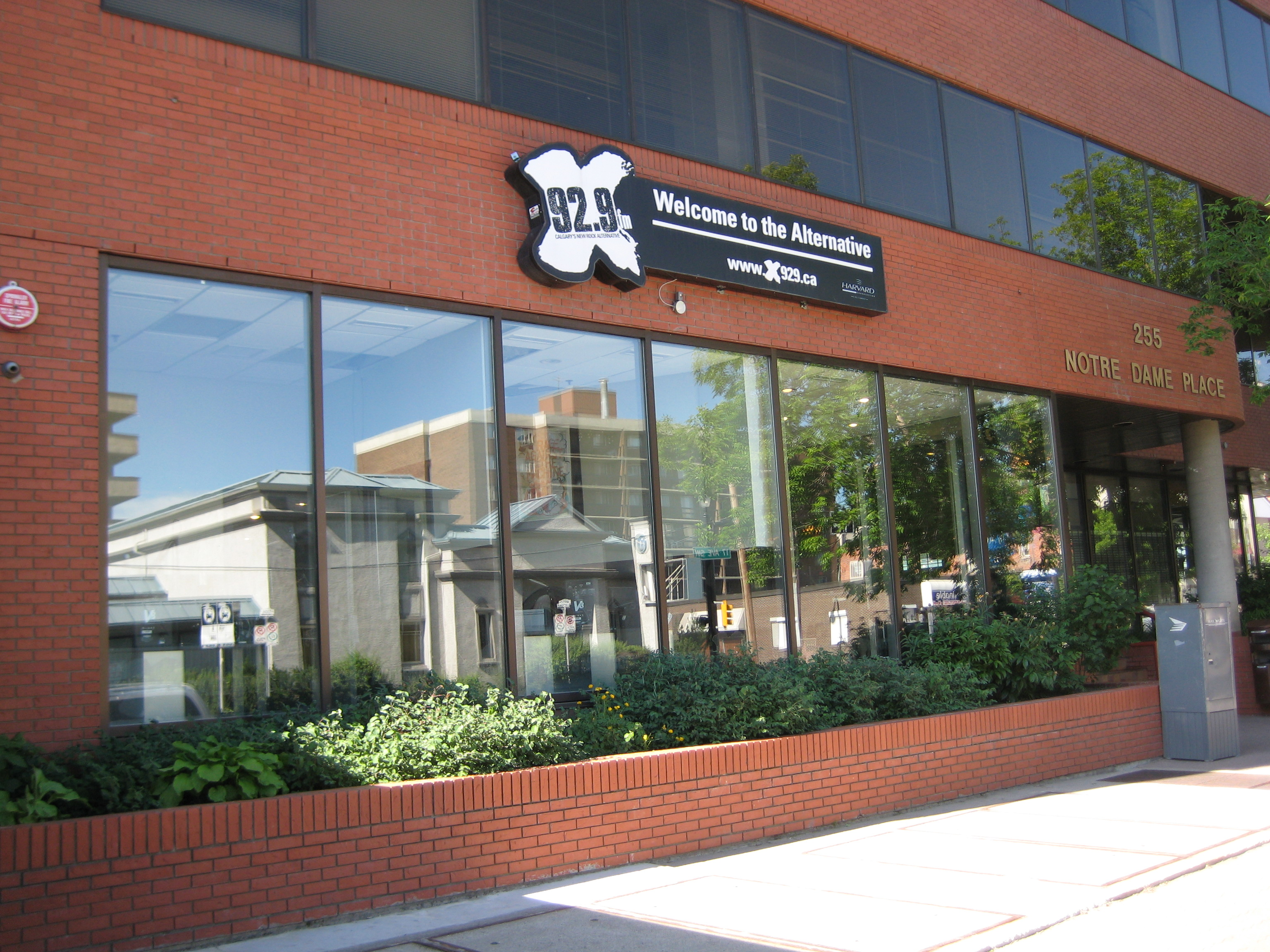
CFEX's studios

On December 21, 2012, in honour of the alleged Mayan apocalypse, CFEX stunted by playing R.E.M.'s song "It's The End Of The World As We Know It (And I Feel Fine)" all day long, interspersed with "Get to Know a Mayan" and "Apocalypse Survival Tips" segments.
