= CIZL-FM =

Radio station in Regina, Saskatchewan

Coordinates: 50°30′22″N 104°33′07″W

- Regina, Saskatchewan; Canada
- Broadcast area: Southern Saskatchewan
- Frequency: 98.9 MHz
- Branding: Z99

Programming
- Format: Hot adult contemporary
- Affiliations: Premiere Networks

Ownership
- Owner: Rawlco Communications
- Sister stations: CJME, CKCK-FM

History
- First air date: June 1982

Technical information
- Licensing authority: CRTC
- Class: C
- ERP: 100,000 watts
- HAAT: 190 metres (620 ft)

Links
- Webcast: Listen Live
- Website: z99.com

CIZL-FM (98.9 MHz), known on air as Z99, is a radio station in Regina, Saskatchewan. It has studios with sister stations CJME and CKCK-FM at 2401 Saskatchewan Drive in Regina.

CIZL was founded in 1982 by Rawlco Communications. Its original format was modern rock, and has evolved over the years between the contemporary hit radio and Adult CHR formats. However, its name and logo have remained constant.

The station originally carried the Crash & Mars morning show from former sister station CKNO-FM in Edmonton; the duo originally began on CIZL, but were relocated to CKNO following that station's launch by Rawlco in 2010.

The station holds an annual charity event, the Z99 Radiothon, in support of the Regina General Hospital's neonatal intensive care unit.
