= CIUP-FM =

Radio station in Edmonton, Alberta

- Edmonton, Alberta; Canada
- Broadcast area: Edmonton Metropolitan Region
- Frequency: 99.3 MHz
- Branding: Up! 99.3

Programming
- Format: Adult hits

Ownership
- Owner: Jim Pattison Group
- Sister stations: CKNO-FM

History
- First air date: December 8, 2005
- Former call signs: CHMC-FM (2005–2010)
- Call sign meaning: "Up"

Technical information
- Class: C1
- ERP: vertical polarization: 25,000 watts horizontal polarization: 100,000 watts
- HAAT: 272 meters (892 ft)
- Transmitter coordinates: 53°24′13.5″N 113°20′49″W

Links
- Webcast: Listen Live
- Website: up993.com

CIUP-FM (99.3 FM, Up! 99.3) is a radio station in Edmonton, Alberta. Owned by the Jim Pattison Group, it broadcasts an adult hits format.

== History ==
The station received approval by the CRTC in July 2005 and was launched in September of that year for on-air testing. The station officially debuted at 2 p.m. on December 8, 2005 as CHMC-FM with a smooth jazz format branded as Magic 99. Magic's first song was Michael Bublé's Sway.

On October 19, 2010, the station dropped its smooth jazz format, in favor of its current adult hits format as Up! 99.3, and adopted its current callsign. The first song on "Up!" was "Don't Stop" by Fleetwood Mac. The launch was simulcasted on Global TV. According to the station's website, the station plays a wide mix of classic songs from the late 1960s through the 80s with some currents/recurrents, along with 90s and 2000s music. Unlike most adult hits stations, CIUP leans towards heavier music.

On August 17, 2011, Rawlco Communications received CRTC approval to change the technical parameters of the station by increasing the effective height of antenna above average terrain from 148.4 to 272 meters and by relocating its transmitter.

On July 10, 2014, Rawlco announced the sale of its Edmonton radio stations to The Jim Pattison Group.

As of Feb 28, 2021, CIUP is the 2nd-most-listened-to radio station in the Edmonton market according to a PPM data report released by Numeris.

== Former Logo ==
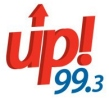
