= CHMX-FM =

Radio station in Regina, Saskatchewan

Coordinates: 50°30′22″N 104°33′07″W

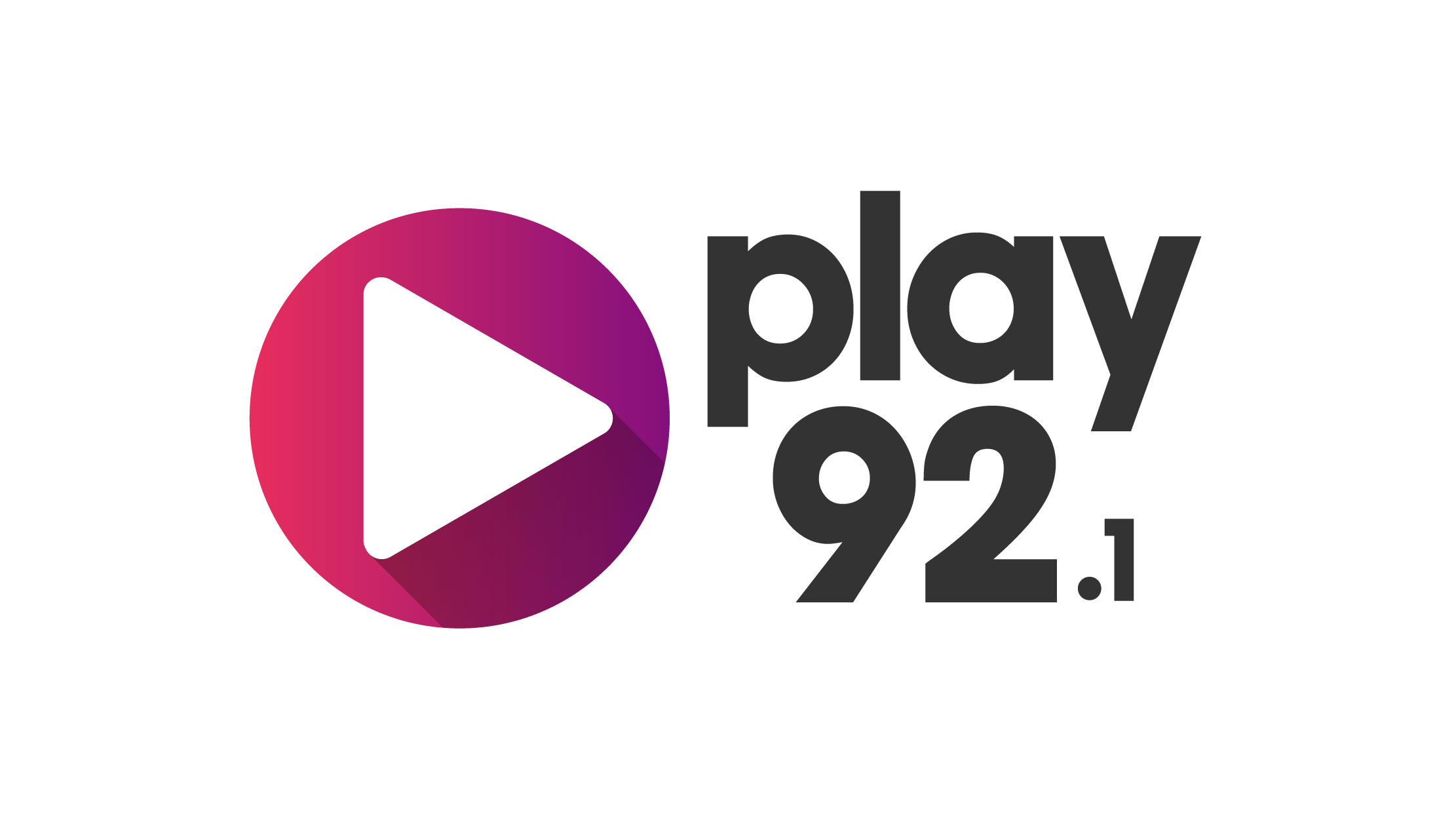
- Regina, Saskatchewan; Canada
- Broadcast area: Southern Saskatchewan
- Frequency: 92.1 MHz
- Branding: Play 92.1

Programming
- Format: Hot adult contemporary

Ownership
- Owner: Harvard Media
- Sister stations: CKRM, CFWF-FM

History
- First air date: February 4, 1966
- Former call signs: CFMQ-FM (1966–1991)
- Call sign meaning: "Mix"

Technical information
- Class: C
- ERP: 100,000 watts
- HAAT: 190 metres (620 ft)

Links
- Webcast: Listen Live
- Website: play92.ca

CHMX-FM (92.1 MHz, Play 92.1) is a radio station in Regina, Saskatchewan. Owned by Harvard Media, it broadcasts a gold-based hot adult contemporary format.

== History ==
The station was launched on February 4, 1966, by Metropolitan Broadcasting with the call sign CFMQ. It was acquired by Buffalo Broadcasting in 1974 and by Harvard Broadcasting, its current owner, in 1981. It adopted its present call sign in 1991 when it flipped from adult contemporary to contemporary hit radio as CHMX-FM "Mix 92". In 1994, it flipped to country as Country 92, airing a "new country" format to flank sister station CKRM. In 1999, the station flipped to a CHR format as Kiss 92. In 2001, it flipped to soft adult contemporary as Lite 92. On August 3, 2011, it flipped to mainstream adult contemporary as My 92.1.

On September 4, 2020, CHMX flipped to a rhythmic adult contemporary format as Play 92, featuring a focus on hit music from the 1990s and 2000s. Station management felt that the existing adult contemporary format's growth potential was limited, and that the new format filled a niche not yet covered by existing stations in the market. The success of the "Play" format at sister station CKPW-FM in Edmonton was also cited as a factor.
