= CKNO-FM =

Radio station in Edmonton, Alberta

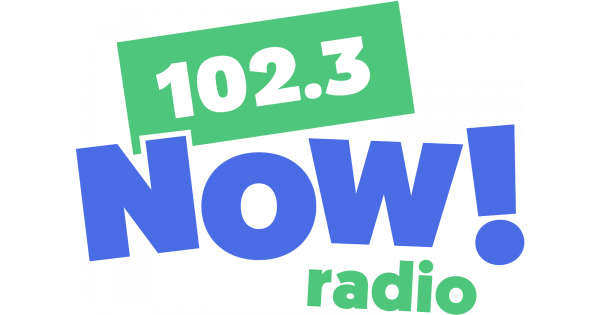
- Edmonton, Alberta; Canada
- Broadcast area: Edmonton Metropolitan Region
- Frequency: 102.3 MHz
- Branding: 102.3 Now! Radio

Programming
- Format: Hot adult contemporary

Ownership
- Owner: Jim Pattison Group
- Sister stations: CIUP-FM

History
- First air date: February 23, 2010
- Call sign meaning: Sounds like "now"

Technical information
- Class: C1
- ERP: 100,000 watts
- Transmitter coordinates: 53°31′54.7″N 113°46′52.2″W

Links
- Website: 1023nowradio.com

CKNO-FM (102.3 MHz, 102.3 Now! Radio) is a radio station in Edmonton, Alberta. Owned by the Jim Pattison Group, it broadcasts a hot adult contemporary format.

As of Feb 28, 2021, CKNO is the top radio station in the Edmonton market according to a PPM data report released by Numeris.

== History ==
Logo until 2021

The station received approval by the CRTC on October 17, 2008, and officially launched on February 23, 2010 as 102.3 Now! Radio. At launch, Rawlco's programming director Doug Pringle stated that Now! Radio would have a large focus on music from singer-songwriters, uninterrupted blocks of music as long as 90 minutes from 9 a.m. to 6 a.m. daily, and encourage DJs to engage in topical discussions. The Crash & Mars morning show from Regina, Saskatchewan sister station CIZL-FM also relocated to CKNO.

On July 10, 2014, Rawlco announced the sale of CKNO and sister station CIUP to the Jim Pattison Group.

Since the acquisition, Pattison has extended the Now! format and branding (which carries a focus on topical discussions) to sister stations, such as CKPK in Vancouver, and CHNW-FM in Winnipeg; however, these two stations would both drop the format in favour of modern rock in 2024. CKCE-FM in Calgary also uses a similar format, but as Today Radio. It has also syndicated the Crash & Mars show to sister stations, often as a replacement for local morning shows due to cost-cutting measures.
