= CKOM =

Radio station in Saskatoon

Coordinates: 52°04′45″N 106°30′41″W

- Saskatoon, Saskatchewan; Canada
- Broadcast area: Central Saskatchewan
- Frequency: 650 kHz
- Branding: News Talk 650 CKOM

Programming
- Format: News/Talk

Ownership
- Owner: Rawlco Communications
- Sister stations: CFMC-FM, CJDJ-FM, CKBL-FM

History
- First air date: June 8, 1951
- Former call signs: CKOM (1951–1998); CINT (1998–2002)
- Former frequencies: 1340 kHz (1951–1960); 1250 kHz (1960–1985)

Technical information
- Class: B
- Power: 10 kW

Links
- Website: ckom.com

CKOM is a radio station in Saskatoon, Saskatchewan, Canada broadcasting on 650 kHz. Its format is news/talk. It shares studio space with sister stations CFMC-FM and CJDJ-FM at 715 Saskatchewan Crescent West, also the home of Rawlco Radio's Corporate Offices.

== History ==
CKOM began broadcasting on 1340 kHz on June 8, 1951 with an output of 250 watts and its offices were based out of the historic Empire Hotel. By 1960, CKOM was broadcasting full-time on the AM frequency of 1250 kHz with an increase in power to 10,000 watts. During the earlier part of the decade, the station became a Top 40 station.

In early August 1985, the station was sold to Rawlco Communications and changed frequencies to 650 kHz. At the time, the station continued to air in its Top 40 format. After moving to its 650 AM frequency, the station rebranded as a "Hot Hits" format that was also used in Chicago, Detroit, Baltimore, Philadelphia, and San Francisco. giving it the name 65 CKOM. It is known to be the only Hot Hits station in Canada. Later changing its music format to Classic gold and great oldies playing songs from the 1950s, 1960s, 1970s, and 1980s; and its sister station C95 would play the new stuff and also 1980s music.

In 1998, the station switched to a news/talk format. The station was branded as NTR, and for a brief period of time changed its callsign to CINT before returning to the original callsign CKOM. During this time, the CKOM callsign belonged to the FM station at 102.1 now known as Rock 102.

In September 2006, the station changed its on-air brand to become News Talk 650.

CKOM has won dozens of national and regional awards, including multiple national Best Radio Newscast awards, as well as recognition for Breaking News coverage, Feature Reporting, Ongoing Coverage, Investigative Reporting, Special Event coverage and Commentary.

In late 2008, the station added the callsign CKOM back to its on-air brand, becoming known as 'News Talk 650 CKOM'.

== Programming ==
Most of CKOM's weekday lineup is shared with its Regina sister station CJME, including The Evan Bray Show, Saskatchewan Afternoon with Justin Blackwell, and sports talk show The Green Zone on afternoon drive. A local morning show is hosted by Mark Loshack, Gerald Bauman, Erin McNutt, and Kevin Martel.
