= CKRM =

Radio station in Regina, Saskatchewan

Coordinates: 50°19′36″N 104°37′16″W

- Regina, Saskatchewan; Canada
- Broadcast area: Southern Saskatchewan
- Frequency: 620 kHz
- Branding: 620 CKRM

Programming
- Format: Country
- Network: CBC Dominion (1944–1962)
- Affiliations: Regina Pats, Saskatchewan Roughriders

Ownership
- Owner: Harvard Media
- Sister stations: CFWF-FM, CHMX-FM

History
- First air date: 1926 (in Moose Jaw; moved to Regina in 1935)
- Former call signs: CJRM (1926–1940)
- Former frequencies: 665 kHz (1926–1928); 880 kHz (1928–1934); 960 kHz (1934, 1940-1941); 540 kHz (1934–1940); 980 kHz (1941–2001)
- Call sign meaning: Canada Knows Regina Music

Technical information
- Class: B
- Power: 10,000 watts

Links
- Webcast: Listen live
- Website: 620ckrm.com

CKRM is an AM radio station in Regina, Saskatchewan, broadcasting at 620 kHz. Owned by Harvard Media, CKRM broadcasts a full service country format.

Alongside music programming, CKRM is notably the flagship station of the Saskatchewan Roughriders of the Canadian Football League, and the Regina Pats of the Western Hockey League.

== History ==
CKRM was established in 1926 in Moose Jaw under the callsign CJRM. Its original owner was the Winnipeg, Manitoba grain merchant James Richardson and Sons.

In 1928, the Richardsons opened CJRW in Winnipeg and networked their two stations. CJRM opened a studio in Regina in 1933, and by 1935 all station operations were based in Regina. The stations were purchased by the Sifton family, owners of the Regina Leader-Post and CKCK Radio in 1940, and CJRM became CKRM. In 1944, CKRM affiliated with the CBC's Dominion Network until 1962 when the network was disbanded and CKRM became independent.

In late 1971, CKRM dropped its easy listening format and became a country station.

In 2001, the station would relocate from 980 to 620 kHz, shortly after the original CKCK radio closed down. CJME, formerly on 1300 kHz, moved to CKRM's former frequency. The move gave CKRM access to the second-most powerful transmitting facility in Saskatchewan, and one of the largest coverage areas in North America. Due to its low AM frequency, transmitter power, and Saskatchewan's flat land (with near-perfect ground conductivity), CKRM's daytime signal covers most of Saskatchewan's densely populated area, as well as parts of North Dakota and Montana. CKRM changed hands a number of times before its acquisition by Regina's Hill family, then-owners of CKCK-TV in 1981, under the Harvard Broadcasting banner.

The station moved into its current facility in April 2006. It is at the corner of 12th and Rose in downtown Regina.

== Programming ==
CKRM is the flagship radio station of the Regina Pats of the WHL, and the Saskatchewan Roughriders of the Canadian Football League. Roughriders games are accompanied by pre- and post-game shows, Countdown to Kickoff and Rider Roundtable, all of which are also syndicated province-wide as part of the Roughrider Football Network. It also carries a sports talk show on weekday afternoons, The SportsCage.

Jim Smalley hosted CKRM's agricultural news program Saskatchewan Agriculture Today; Smalley retired from broadcasting on April 28, 2023, after a 50-year career on the agriculture beat spanning CKRM and the original CKCK. In honour of his career, CKRM announced during Canadian Western Agribition 2022 that it would dedicate its newsroom as the Jim Smalley Newsroom.
