= CJDJ-FM =

Radio station in Saskatoon

Coordinates: 52°10′54″N 106°23′14″W

- Saskatoon, Saskatchewan; Canada
- Broadcast area: Saskatoon metropolitan area
- Frequency: 102.1 MHz
- Branding: Rock 102

Programming
- Format: Active rock

Ownership
- Owner: Rawlco Communications
- Sister stations: CKOM, CFMC-FM, CKBL-FM

History
- First air date: 1990
- Former call signs: CHSN (1990–1998); CKOM (1998–2002)

Technical information
- Class: C1
- ERP: 100,000 watts
- HAAT: 161.5 metres (530 ft)

Links
- Webcast: Listen Live
- Website: rock102rocks.com

CJDJ-FM is a Canadian radio station, broadcasting at 102.1 FM in Saskatoon, Saskatchewan. The station, owned by Rawlco Communications, broadcasts an active rock format as Rock 102. It shares studio space with sister stations CFMC and CKOM at 715 Saskatchewan Crescent West, also the home of Rawlco Radio's Corporate Offices.

== History ==
The station received approval by the CRTC in 1989 and originally launched in 1990 as CHSN-FM, an adult contemporary station branded as Sun 102 and owned by Highline Broadcasting. The station was later purchased by Elmer Hildebrand, and operated by Rawlco under a local management agreement with the name 102.1 the River.

In 1998 the call letters were changed to CKOM, and the station changed to a format similar to the oldies previously played on 650 AM. The AM station became CINT, broadcasting as 650 NTR with a news/talk format that it retains to this day. CKOM FM102 was later purchased by Rawlco on December 21, 2000. Noting market demand for a dedicated rock and roll station in the city, on April 18, 2001, at 6 a.m. Saskatoon time, CKOM-FM changed its format from adult contemporary to rock, styling itself as CKOM Rock 102. In 2002, the CKOM call letters returned to 650 AM, giving way to the current name and call letters.

The CHSN-FM callsign and format were subsequently adopted by Golden West Broadcasting on a new station in Estevan.
