= The Battlefords—Meadow Lake =

Former federal electoral district in Saskatchewan, Canada

The Battlefords—Meadow Lake was a federal electoral district in Saskatchewan, Canada, that was represented in the House of Commons of Canada from 1979 to 1997. This riding was created in 1976 from parts of Battleford—Kindersley, Meadow Lake and Saskatoon—Biggar ridings.

It was abolished in 1996 when it was redistributed into Churchill River, Battlefords—Lloydminster, Wanuskewin and Saskatoon—Rosetown ridings.

== Historical boundaries ==
1976 representation order

1987 representation order

== Election results ==
1979 Canadian federal election
Party	Candidate	Votes
Progressive Conservative	NYLANDER, Terry A.	11,003
New Democratic	NESDOLY, Eli	10,327
Liberal	(x) MCISAAC, Cliff	7,318
Independent	STALWICK, Jim	353

1980 Canadian federal election
Party	Candidate	Votes
New Democratic	ANGUISH, Doug	9,819
Progressive Conservative	(x) NYLANDER, Terry A.	9,343
Liberal	MCISAAC, Cliff	8,088
Independent	WRIGHT, Dane	178

1984 Canadian federal election
Party	Candidate	Votes
Progressive Conservative	GORMLEY, John	12,895
New Democratic	(x) ANGUISH, Doug	12,559
Liberal	DUROCHER, Jim	4,002
Confederation of Regions	LANGLEY, Connie	319

1988 Canadian federal election
Party	Candidate	Votes	
New Democratic	TAYLOR, Len	14,516	42.5%
Progressive Conservative	(x) GORMLEY, John	13,804	40.4%
Liberal	CURRIE, Neil	5,152	15.1%
Reform	QUIST, Ted	461	1.4%
Confederation of Regions	LANGLEY, Connie	197	0.6%

1993 Canadian federal election
Party	Candidate	Votes
New Democratic	(x) TAYLOR, Len	9,628
Reform	BLEAKNEY, Delon	8,905
Liberal	CURRIE, Neil	7,130
Progressive Conservative	CHEVELDAYOFF, Ken	4,254
Independent	CHRÉTIEN, Leon W.	605
Canada Party	FRANKLIN, Peter	201

== See also ==
- List of Canadian electoral districts
- Historical federal electoral districts of Canada
