= CKEA-FM =

Radio station in Edmonton, Alberta

- Edmonton, Alberta; Canada
- Broadcast area: Edmonton Metropolitan Region
- Frequency: 95.7 MHz
- Branding: Cruz 95.7

Programming
- Format: Mainstream rock

Ownership
- Owner: Harvard Media
- Sister stations: CKPW-FM

History
- First air date: September 6, 2010
- Call sign meaning: Edmonton, Alberta

Technical information
- Class: C1
- ERP: 47,000 watts average 100,000 watts peak
- HAAT: 210 meters (690 ft)
- Transmitter coordinates: 53°25′9″N 113°14′29″W

Links
- Website: cruz957.com

CKEA-FM (95.7 FM, "Cruz 95.7") is a radio station serving Edmonton, Alberta. Owned by Harvard Media, it broadcasts a mainstream rock format. CKEA's studios are located on Calgary Trail in Edmonton, while its transmitter is located at Ellerslie Road and Provincial Highway 21, just southeast of Edmonton city limits.

As of February 28, 2021, CKEA is the 11th-most-listened-to radio station in the Edmonton market according to a PPM data report released by Numeris.

== History ==
The station's license was approved by the CRTC in July 2009, and officially launched on September 6, 2010 as 95.7 The Sound, with an adult album alternative format. On March 25, 2011, at Noon, the station relaunched as Lite 95.7, soft launching with a weekend of Christmas music (promoting the station's intent to air all-Christmas music during future holiday seasons) before officially beginning an adult contemporary format the following Monday.

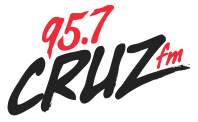
Former logo used until 2026.

On December 27, 2013, CKEA flipped to adult hits as 95.7 Cruz FM, with a format focusing on rock hits from the 1980s and later. The station's branding and format is modelled upon sister station CFWD-FM in Saskatoon, which adopted it the previous year.

On August 26, 2025, Harvard announced that the former CFRN morning sports radio show The Nielson Show with Dustin Nielson would air on CKEA beginning September 3, as part of a partnership with Edmonton Sports Talk.

In November 2026, Harvard announced that former CIRK personality Terry Evans would host a new afternoon drive show on CKEA—The Terry Evans Show—beginning November 16, which will feature discussion of Edmonton sports (including contributions from Harvard-owned CFL blog 3DownNation), as well as other local topics. Alongside the launch, CKEA underwent a repositioning as "Sports that Rock", with its playlist now focusing primarily on arena rock "anthems" one would commonly hear at sporting events. A Harvard executive stated that the new format was "built for the way this city spends game day, with Dustin in the morning, Terry on the drive home, and the music Edmonton plays on the way to the rink."
