= CJME =

Radio station in Regina, Saskatchewan

Coordinates: 50°21′13″N 104°37′21″W

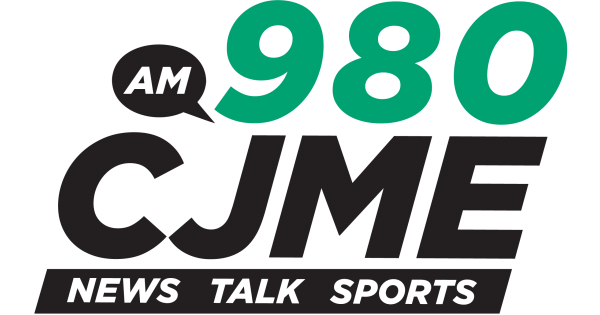
- Regina, Saskatchewan; Canada
- Broadcast area: Southern Saskatchewan
- Frequency: 980 kHz
- Branding: News Talk 980 CJME

Programming
- Format: News/talk

Ownership
- Owner: Rawlco Communications
- Sister stations: CIZL-FM, CKCK-FM

History
- First air date: November 25, 1959
- Former frequencies: 1300 kHz (1959–2002)

Technical information
- Licensing authority: CRTC
- Class: B
- Power: 10,000 watts

Links
- Webcast: Listen live
- Website: cjme.com

CJME (980 AM) is a radio station in Regina, Saskatchewan, Canada. Its format is news/talk. It shares studios with sister stations CIZL-FM and CKCK-FM at 2401 Saskatchewan Drive in Regina.

== History ==
CJME was founded and signed on the air on November 25, 1959, by a group of businessmen led by J. Marsh Ellis, a former radio salesman. Its original format was easy listening, but the station was not successful until it began playing top 40 music in 1963.

In 1967, CJME was purchased by the Rawlinson family, owners of CKBI radio and CKBI-TV in Prince Albert. Their company later came to be called Rawlco Communications.

Continuing its successful top 40 format, the station was renamed as CJME Power 13 in early 1987.

During its 25th anniversary of being a top 40 station on April 7, 1988; a random mix of former songs from the '60s, '70s, and '80s started to mix in for a short time, although still continued to air a strong top 40 focus.

By the 1990s the station's format had evolved from Top 40 to oldies.

In 1998, CJME relaunched as News Talk CJME, forming a network with Saskatoon station CKOM, then known as NTR.

At midnight on September 7, 1998, the last song played on CJME was "American Pie" by Don McLean, then the station started a loop recording of "a new station is coming" for an entire day.

At 5:30AM on September 8, 1998, CJME was relaunched as a news/talk radio station.

In 2001, CJME moved from their longtime position at 1300 kHz to the 980 kHz frequency.

On September 11, 2006, the station changed its on-air brand from 980 CJME to News Talk 980.

In late 2008, the station added the CJME call letters back to its on-air brand, becoming known as 'News Talk 980 CJME'.

Former logo used for News Talk 980 CJME.

On September 29, 2009, CJME applied to add new FM rebroadcasters to extend its coverage into south Saskatchewan. The new transmitters would be located at Gravelbourg (107.1), Swift Current (101.7) and Warmley (107.3), all with the ERP of 100,000 watts. This application received CRTC approval on February 26, 2010.

== Rebroadcasters ==
Call sign	Frequency	City of License
CJME-1-FM	101.7 FM	Swift Current
CJME-2-FM	107.1 FM	Gravelbourg
CJME-3-FM	107.3 FM	Warmley

== Programming ==
Most of CJME's weekday lineup is shared with its Saskatoon sister station CKOM, including The Evan Bray Show, Saskatchewan Afternoon with Justin Blackwell, and sports talk show The Green Zone with Jamie Nye on afternoon drive. A local morning show is hosted by former CFRE anchor Greg Morgan.

In November 2023, John Gormley announced that he would end his program on CJME/CKOM after 25 years; former Regina police chief Evan Bray was announced as his successor beginning November 27, 2023.

== Current and former on-air personalities ==
- Greg Morgan
- Evan Bray
- John Himpe
- Sam Mccaig
- John Gormley
- Jamie Nye
- Murray Wood
- Sarah Mills
- Stu Jeffries
- Drew Remenda
- Dave Arnold
- Harry Dekker
- Darren Lamb
- Hart Kirsch
- Craig Peters
