= CKPW-FM =

Radio station in Edmonton

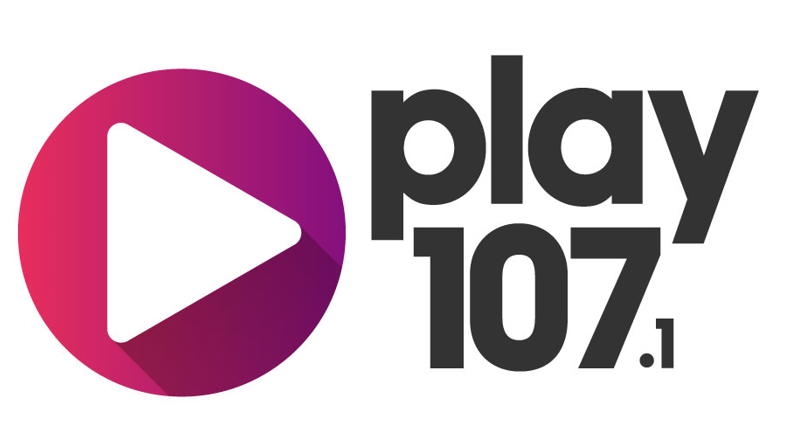
- Edmonton, Alberta; Canada
- Broadcast area: Edmonton Metropolitan Region
- Frequency: 107.1 MHz
- Branding: Play 107.1

Programming
- Format: Rhythmic adult contemporary

Ownership
- Owner: Harvard Media
- Sister stations: CKEA-FM

History
- First air date: October 6, 2009
- Former call signs: CJNW-FM (2009–2019)
- Call sign meaning: "Power" (former branding)

Technical information
- Class: C
- ERP: vertical polarization: 9,600 watts horizontal polarization: 40,000 watts
- HAAT: 272 metres (892 ft)
- Transmitter coordinates: 53°31′54.7″N 113°46′52.2″W

Links
- Webcast: Listen Live
- Website: play107.com

CKPW-FM (107.1 FM, "Play 107.1") is a radio station in Edmonton, Alberta. Owned by Harvard Media, it broadcasts a rhythmic adult contemporary format. Its studios are located on the Calgary Trail, while its transmitter is located in Acheson.

== History ==
On October 17, 2008, the CRTC approved an application by John Charles Yerxa for a new FM radio station in Edmonton, which would feature a "diverse" format of new popular music aimed towards teens and young adult demographics. CJNW-FM started testing on September 16, 2009 (under the working title New 107 FM), and officially launched on October 6, 2009 as rhythmic contemporary Hot 107 FM. John Yerxa is the son of Hal Yerxa, a former broadcaster at CFCA-FM, and was the only local station owner in Edmonton.

On December 21, 2011, the CRTC approved the sale of CJNW-FM from Yerxa to Harvard Broadcasting of Regina, Saskatchewan, making it a sister station to CKEA-FM. Yerxa cited health issues as a factor in the sale.

=== Power 107 and trademark dispute ===
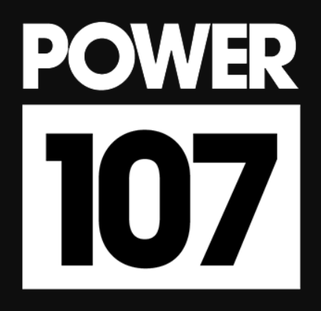
Logo initially used as Power 107

On August 15, 2019, the station flipped to a rhythmic adult contemporary format format as Power 107. The new format focuses mainly on pop, rhythmic, and pop rock hits from the 1990s and 2000s, along with some recurrents, with Harvard Media initially promoting the format as "rhythmic classic hits". The station changed its call letters to CKPW-FM to match the new branding.

The "Power" brand was formerly used by CKNG-FM during their run as a Top 40 station from 1991 through 2004. This prompted that station's current owner Corus Entertainment to file a trademark lawsuit against Harvard in October 2019, alleging that CKPW's branding and imaging was deliberately intended to trade upon the goodwill of the "Power" brand, including use of a similarly-designed black and white logo, and use of a nearly-identical catchphrase for its "phrase that pays" promotion. Corus previously held trademarks on the names "Power 92" and "Power 107" (the latter for CFGQ-FM in Calgary), but they expired in 2015 due to non-renewal. It continues to hold a trademark on the previous "Power" logo, which was renewed through 2033.

On November 18, 2019, a Calgary court approved an injunction by Corus Entertainment, ordering Harvard to cease using the "Power" name or any variation of it. Harvard stated that it would not attempt to continue pursuing the matter in court, and planned to seek suggestions for a new name from listeners (who would also be entered in a contest to win $1,007). CKPW rebranded as Play 107.1 on December 20, 2019.

In the Numeris November 2019—February 2020 report, CKPW held a 3.1 audience share, increasing to 4.3 in the spring report. In September 2020, Harvard would extend the "Play" format to Regina sister station CHMX-FM.
