= CFWF-FM =

Radio station in Regina, Saskatchewan, Canada

Coordinates: 50°30′22″N 104°33′07″W

- Regina, Saskatchewan; Canada
- Broadcast area: Southern Saskatchewan
- Frequency: 104.9 MHz
- Branding: 104.9 The Wolf

Programming
- Format: Active rock

Ownership
- Owner: Harvard Media
- Sister stations: CKRM, CHMX-FM

History
- First air date: 1982
- Former call signs: CKIT-FM (1982–1996)
- Call sign meaning: "Wolf" (station branding)

Technical information
- Licensing authority: CRTC
- Class: C
- ERP: 100,000 watts
- HAAT: 190 metres (620 ft)

Links
- Webcast: Listen Live
- Website: thewolfrocks.com

CFWF-FM is a Canadian radio station owned by Harvard Media, and is licensed to Regina, Saskatchewan. It broadcasts on the assigned frequency of 104.9 MHz, and is branded as 104.9 The Wolf, playing an active rock format.

Between 1998 and 2006, its studio was located at 2060 Halifax Street, Regina, Saskatchewan. As of 2006, its studio is located in the Century Plaza building at 1900 Rose Street Regina, Saskatchewan.

The station was launched in 1982 as CKIT-FM, an easy listening station. In 1989, it began calling itself K105 FM, with a similar format, and later identified as Magic 104.9 and Hot 105. On January 5, 1996, it adopted "The Wolf" branding, with a rock format.

In 2017, CFWF won the award for best medium-market radio station at the Canadian Music and Broadcast Industry Awards.
