= CKBL-FM =

Radio station in Saskatoon, Saskatchewan

Coordinates: 52°10′54″N 106°23′14″W

- Saskatoon, Saskatchewan; Canada
- Broadcast area: Saskatoon Metropolitan Area
- Frequency: 92.9 MHz
- Branding: 92.9 The Grid

Programming
- Format: Country
- Affiliations: CBC Dominion (1944–1962)

Ownership
- Owner: Rawlco Communications
- Sister stations: CFMC-FM, CJDJ-FM, CKOM

History
- First air date: July 18, 1923
- Former call signs: CFQC (1923–1995); CFQC-FM (1995–2007)
- Former frequencies: 400 metres (1923–1925); 910 kHz (1925–1933); 840 kHz (1933–1941); 600 kHz (1941–1995)
- Call sign meaning: The Bull (former branding)

Technical information
- Class: C1
- ERP: 100,000 watts
- HAAT: 195 metres (640 ft)

Links
- Webcast: Listen Live
- Website: https://www.929thegrid.com/

CKBL-FM (92.9 FM, 92.9 The Grid) is a radio station in Saskatoon, Saskatchewan. Owned by Rawlco Communications, it broadcasts a country format.

== History ==
The station originated on the AM dial as CFQC, which began broadcasting in 1923. It was founded by electrical supply shop owners A. A. "Pappy" Murphy and David Streb. Murphy bought out Streb in 1932.

The station was an affiliate of the Canadian Radio Broadcasting Commission from 1933 to 1936 when it affiliated with the newly formed Canadian Broadcasting Corporation. It lost that affiliation in 1939 when the CBC signed on CBK as its outlet for all of southern and central Saskatchewan. In 1944 it became an affiliate of the CBC's Dominion Network until 1962 when the network was reabsorbed into the main CBC Radio network and CFQC became independent. In 1954, CFQC-TV was established by the Murphy family and became Saskatoon's first television station; initially a CBC affiliate, in the early 1970s it switched to the CTV Television Network. Both the TV and radio stations shared some on-air personnel such as newsreaders.

Pappy Murphy died in 1959. His family sold CFQC-AM and TV to Baton Broadcasting in 1972, earning a handsome return on its original investment of 49 years earlier. Baton exited radio in 1991, selling CFQC to George Gallagher, at which point the radio station's ties to its TV namesake all but ended. However, only two years later, Gallagher was forced into receivership. Clint Forster, owner of 750 CJWW, bought CFQC in 1994, and subsequently requested permission to convert CJWW to an FM station.

On February 6, 1995. CJWW moved to 600 AM, and at 7:00 a.m., CFQC relaunched as CFQC-FM, flipping to country music as Hot 93 FM. The new CFQC would focus on contemporary country music to serve as a flanker to CJWW's "traditional" country format.

In June 2000, CKOM-FM owner Elmer Hildebrand announced his intent to acquire CFQC-FM and CJWW from Forvest Broadcasting; CKOM-FM was concurrently sold to Rawlco Communications. The stations would be consolidated with Hildebrand's new station CJMK-FM at studios in downtown Saskatoon.

On November 1, 2007, CFQC relaunched its country format as 92.9 The Bull, and changed its call letters to CKBL-FM to match the new branding.

In January 2020, the station announced that it would give equal airplay to female musicians.

On November 27, 2025, Rawlco announced its intent to acquire CKBL-FM. The CRTC approved the sale on June 18, 2026, and the station was relaunched by Rawlco as 92.9 The Grid (in homage to Saskatchewan's grid roads) on September 2, 2026.
