= Harvard Media =

Canadian radio station group based in Regina

Harvard Media, formerly Harvard Broadcasting is a radio broadcasting and digital media company in Canada. It is owned by The Hill Companies of Regina.

== History ==
The company now known as Harvard Media first entered broadcasting in 1977 when Michael Sifton sold CKCK-TV to Harvard Developments. The company's first radio assets were purchased in 1981, when Harvard acquired CKRM and what is now CHMX from Buffalo Broadcasting.

Under Harvard ownership, CKRM acquired the radio rights to broadcast Saskatchewan Roughriders games in 1983 on a deal that was signed through 2015. It was subsequently renewed to 2030.

In 1986, CKCK-TV was sold to Baton Broadcasting, marking the company's withdrawal from the television market.

== Assets ==
=== Radio stations ===
Most of the company's stations operate under standardized brands, including Cruz FM (mainstream rock and/or adult hits), Play (rhythmic adult contemporary), and X (modern rock),

- Calgary, Alberta - CFEX-FM
- Edmonton, Alberta - CKEA-FM, CKPW-FM
- Fort McMurray, Alberta - CFVR-FM, CHFT-FM
- Red Deer, Alberta - CKEX-FM, CKIK-FM
- Regina, Saskatchewan - CKRM, CHMX-FM, CFWF-FM
- Saskatoon, Saskatchewan - CFWD-FM
- Yorkton, Saskatchewan - CJGX, CFGW-FM

=== Digital media ===
On March 15, 2024, Harvard acquired the online news websites SaskToday and MooseJawToday from Glacier Media, as part of a wider partnership with the publisher.

In January 2026, it acquired the Canadian Football League blog 3DownNation from Catena Media.

== Awards ==
In 2025, the company won a Western Association of Broadcasters (WAB) gold medal for Community Service Radio (market size under 150,000) for its "Save the Terriers" campaign to secure the future of the Yorkton Terriers Junior A hockey team.
