= Rhythmic adult contemporary =

Radio format

Rhythmic adult contemporary, often abbreviated as rhythmic AC or RAC, is an adult contemporary radio format. The format focuses primarily on rhythmic hits aimed towards an adult audience, often resembling a mixture of the classic hits and hot adult contemporary formats in practice. It typically focuses on genres such as disco, classic hip-hop, dance pop, and house music of the late 1980s/early 1990s.

== Format history ==
The first station to try this approach was WHBT/Milwaukee, Wisconsin, which lasted from 1986 to 1987, although it was more Hot AC in nature. But eight years later in 1996, another Milwaukee outlet, WAMG, "Magic 103.7", would be the first to pioneer the "Official" rhythmic AC format, calling itself "Rhythm & Romance" which featured Mid-tempo Rhythmic R&B/Pop tracks (ironically, Milwaukee would once again pick up a Rhythmic AC for the third time in December 2014, when WZTI filled the void after an eighteen-year gap, although that station leaned towards rhythmic oldies; it returned to a True Oldies Channel-led oldies format in August 2015).

In February 1996, WYNY in New York City flipped to the format under the name "103-5 The New KTU", utilizing a "Rhythmic Hot AC" approach with dance-pop tracks added to the mix. The station instantly skyrocketed to #1 in the New York City Arbitron ratings in the next book. Because of this, other stations, like KBKS/Seattle, WDRQ/Detroit (which likewise referred to itself as "93-1 The New DRQ") and KIBB/Los Angeles flipped to the format. While WDRQ was a moderate ratings success (the station's true ratings boom came after it evolved into a rhythmic-oriented Contemporary Hit format by 1999), KBKS and KIBB were less successful, resulting in KBKS flipping to Top 40/CHR in May 1997, and KIBB flipped to a format they pioneered: "rhythmic oldies", in November 1997.

Beginning in 2006, there was a trend of several stations in the United States switching to the rhythmic AC format using the brand Movin, which debuted on Seattle station KQMV in May of that year. Clear Channel Communications also enjoyed a fair amount of success with Rhythmic AC during this time period, using the continued success of WKTU as its basis for several of its stations, including WDTW-FM Detroit, WMIA Miami, and WISX Philadelphia. This boom screeched to a halt by the early 2010s, with many of the stations evolving into Mainstream or Rhythmic Top 40 (like KQMV or KMVQ San Francisco), or flipping to other formats, in part due to declining ratings and trying to adapt currents into this niche genre. As of July 2016, only a handful of "Movin'" branded stations remain with a Rhythmic AC format (see list below).

Rhythmic AC came to Canada in 1999, when French-language CFGL-FM in Montreal, Quebec made its debut as "Rythme FM" name. However, the Rythme FM network is now adult contemporary. During the mid-2000s, when the format started to gain popularity, many hot adult contemporary stations in Canada started to follow a Rhythmic AC approach, but still remain Hot AC because of pop-rock content still being played. This was first pioneered by CHUM-FM in Toronto, who had a significant ratings success after starting to lean rhythmic. This approach has worked well in Montreal, where CKBE has had more success with the Rhythmic Hot AC format since its shift from AC in 2011. Unlike CHUM-FM, the currents on CKBE's playlist are more Dance and Rhythmic leaning.

By 2013, the Rhythmic AC format began to make a comeback in certain markets. In January of that year, former news/talk outlet WTKK in Boston flipped to the format. The station's ratings, which were low, have significantly improved to compete effectively with Rhythmic Top 40 WJMN. The station's playlist, initially, had a balance of dance-pop tracks and rhythmic classics, as well as current rhythmic/pop material, but by July 2013, the playlist has shifted to a more urban lean. This revival success story of the format spawned a few similar stations later that year, including KHTP in Seattle, KSSX in San Diego and KRBQ in San Francisco, as well as (for a short time) WIQI in Chicago. KHTP and KRBQ have since shifted in a more Classic Hip-Hop direction, positioning themselves as all-"Throwback" stations, while KSSX flipped to Mainstream Urban in May 2016. The Rhythmic AC renaissance has been particularly felt in the state of Florida: in March 2016, WMIA-FM in Miami, which had switched from Rhythmic AC to Hot AC in August 2014, returned to Rhythmic AC with the slogan "Rhythm from the '80s to Now," and four months later, WJSJ in Jacksonville adopted a "Classic Dance" approach. And in Canada, former Urban outlet CFXJ-FM Toronto went Rhythmic AC as "93.5 The Move" in February 2016.

In January 2015, KKGQ/Wichita was relaunched with the same Rhythmic AC presentation that was previously offered by its successor KMXW from 2004 to 2007, except this time around, it was more focused on current Rhythmic and Mainstream Pop hits and recurrents from the 1990s and 2000s (KMXW's presentation had an emphasis on 1970s and 1980s product). (That station would completely shift towards Hot AC by October 2015, with most of the Rhythmic material being moved to evening hours.) Also in 2015, KJHM in Denver shifted to the format after spending its first 5 years with rhythmic oldies, marking the second station with the format in the market, the first being KPTT from 2006 to 2009.

In the 2020s, a resurgence of the rhythmic hot AC format occurred. This format combines the currents and recurrents of CHR stations with hot AC-like rotations, and a deep gold library that includes classic hip hop and dance/pop throwbacks dating back to the mid-1990s. WBBM-FM/Chicago, KMVA/Phoenix and WFLC/Miami flipped to the format in 2022 and 2023.

Today, stations in the Rhythmic AC format vary widely by market as to how much hip-hop and R&B product are included in the music mix, and how current-intensive they are. Whereas the aforementioned KHTP and KRBQ have repositioned themselves as all-"Throwback" stations specializing in Classic Hip-Hop, WKTU, WMOV and other rhythmic hot ACs leaning heavily toward more modern pop and dance music.

== List of recording artists whose records are played on rhythmic AC radio stations by genre and decade ==
- Aaliyah (urban, '90s)
- ABBA (pop, '70s)
- Ace of Base (pop)
- Akon (urban, 2000s)
- Alicia Keys (urban)
- Amber (dance/club)
- Arrested Development (urban, '90s)
- Bee Gees (pop, '70s)
- Beyoncé (urban)
- Black Eyed Peas (pop)
- Blondie (rock)
- Brenda K. Starr
- Britney Spears
- Carrie Lucas
- Cascada (dance/club, 2000s)
- Cathy Dennis (dance/club)
- CeCe Peniston (dance/club, '90s)
- Celine Dion
- Cheryl Lynn
- Chic (dance/club, '70s)
- Chris Brown (urban)
- Christina Aguilera (pop)
- Coro
- Deniece Williams
- Donna Summer
- Dr. Dre (urban, '90s)
- En Vogue (urban, '90s)
- Exposé
- Freeez
- Gloria Gaynor (dance/club, '70s)
- INOJ
- Jamie Foxx (urban)
- Janet Jackson (urban)
- Jay-Z (urban)
- Jennifer Lopez (pop)
- Joe
- John Legend
- Jomanda
- Justin Timberlake
- K-Ci & JoJo (urban, '90s)
- KC and the Sunshine Band ('70s)
- Kanye West (urban)
- Katy Perry (pop)
- Kesha (pop)
- Kylie Minogue (pop, '80s)
- La Bouche (dance/club, '90s)
- Lady Gaga (pop)
- Leona Lewis (pop)
- Lisa Lisa and Cult Jam (dance/club, '80s)
- Lisette Melendez (dance/club, '80s)
- Loleatta Holloway (dance/club, '70s)
- Luther Vandross (urban, '80s)
- Madonna
- Mariah Carey (pop)
- Mary J. Blige (urban)
- Michael Jackson (pop, '80s)
- Nayobe
- Nolan Thomas
- OutKast
- Patti LaBelle (urban, '70s)
- Paula Abdul
- Pebbles (urban)
- Prince (urban, '80s)
- Real McCoy
- Rihanna (pop)
- Salt-n-Pepa (urban, '80s)
- Sean Paul (Caribbean, 2000s)
- Shannon
- SOS Band
- T-Pain (urban)
- Taylor Dayne (pop, '80s)
- The Jets (rock)
- Timbaland
- Timex Social Club
- TLC (urban, '90s)
- War
- Whitney Houston (urban, '80s)
- Will Smith (urban, '90s)

== List of radio stations using this format ==
=== United States (Rhythmic hot AC) ===
- WKTU - New York, New York (leans pop/dance)
- KPWR - Los Angeles, California (leans urban)
- WBBM-FM - Chicago, Illinois (leans pop/dance)
- WBQT - Boston, Massachusetts (leans urban)
- WFLC - Miami, Florida (leans pop/dance)
- KMVA - Phoenix, Arizona (leans pop/dance)
- KXJM - Portland, Oregon (leans urban)
- KUUU - Salt Lake City, Utah (leans urban)
- WMOV-FM - Virginia Beach, Virginia (leans pop/dance)
- WJYY - Manchester, New Hampshire (leans urban)
- KJXX - Cape Girardeau, Missouri
- WPTY - Long Island, New York (leans pop/dance)
- KGSR - Cedar Park, Texas (leans urban)

=== United States (Rhythmic AC) ===
- KTWV - Los Angeles, California
- WSTR – Atlanta, Georgia
- KAJM - Phoenix, Arizona
- KXQQ-FM - Las Vegas, Nevada
- KUMU-FM - Honolulu, Hawaii (leans towards rhythmic oldies)
- KOMA-HD3 - Oklahoma City, Oklahoma (leans towards classic hip hop)
- WBEN-HD2 - Philadelphia, Pennsylvania (HD2 subcarrier of WBEN-FM)
- KZLJ-LP - La Junta, Colorado
- KJHM-FM - Denver, Colorado (Rhythmic oldies-Leaning)
- WKZF - Peoria, Illinois (leans towards classic hip-hop)
- WQTX - Lansing, Michigan (leans towards classic hip-hop)
- KUUU - Salt Lake City, Utah (leans towards classic hip hop)
- KTGV - Tucson, Arizona (leans towards rhythmic oldies)
- WQKI-FM - Orangeburg, South Carolina (leans towards classic hip-hop)
- WSIM-HD2 - Florence, South Carolina (leans towards classic hip-hop)
- WCBF-HD3 - Elmira, New York (leans towards classic hip hop)

=== United States (Rhythmic adult hits) ===
- WTBC - Chicago, Illinois
- KZFS - Spokane, Washington (leans towards classic hip-hop)
- WDCG-HD2 - Raleigh, North Carolina (leans towards classic hip-hop)
- WRNO-HD2 - New Orleans, Louisiana (leans towards classic hip-hop)
- WMIB-HD3 - Miami, Florida (leans towards classic hip-hop)
- KFBT - Fresno, California (leans towards classic hip hop)
- KHYL - Sacramento, California (leans towards classic hip-hop)
- WZCB-HD2 - Columbus, Ohio (leans towards classic hip-hop)
- WZZR-HD2 - West Palm Beach, Florida (leans towards classic hip-hop)
- KQOD - Stockton, California (leans towards classic hip-hop)
- KABQ-FM - Albuquerque, New Mexico (leans towards classic hip-hop)
- KPRR-HD2 - El Paso, Texas (leans towards classic hip-hop)
- KUBT-HD2 - Honolulu, Hawaii (leans towards classic hip hop)
- KOCN - Oxnard, California (leans towards rhythmic oldies)
- KJMP - Fort Collins, Colorado (leans towards classic hip-hop)
- WJMP - Burlington, Vermont (leans towards classic hip-hop)
- WMGC-FM - Detroit, Michigan (leans towards classic hip-hop)
- WUKS - Fayetteville, North Carolina (leans towards classic hip-hop)
- WXKB-HD2 - Fort Myers, Florida (leans towards classic hip-hop)
- WCHZ-FM - Augusta, Georgia (leans towards classic hip-hop)

=== Mexico ===
- XHRM - Tijuana, Baja California (technically "Rhythmic Oldies", but leans Rhythmic AC)

=== Canada ===
- CHMX-FM - Regina
- CKBE-FM - Montreal
- CKPW-FM - Edmonton

=== Internet stations ===
- Hot 102 (Online station patterned after WLUM's "Hot 102" Rhythmic format from 1979 to 1994, mixed in with currents) - Milwaukee
- BDJ Berlin Digital Jack - Berlin, New York
- Chill-FM - San Francisco, CA
- 95.9 The Bounce - Natchitoches, Louisiana, a rhythmic throwbacks station that leans Urban AC in daytime and Mainstream Urban in nighttime, was broadcast on 1450 KNOC/95.9 K240EY from November 13, 2025 until canceled the licensed in January 2026. but streaming is available on air.

== Former stations that used this format ==
- KHHT - Los Angeles (technically "Rhythmic Oldies", but leaned Rhythmic AC)
- KMVN - Los Angeles
- KIBB - Los Angeles
- KHTI - Lake Arrowhead, California ("Rhythmic Hot AC")
- WMIA - Miami Beach, Florida ("Rhythmic Hot AC")
- WNEW-FM - New York City
- WMUV - Brunswick, Georgia
- WZDJ - Fernandina Beach, Florida (Originally a hybrid of Rhythmic AC and Dance Classics, only to evolve to Dance-leaning Rhythmic Top 40)
- KISQ - San Francisco (switched to Soft AC in April 2016)
- KMVQ - San Francisco
- KRBQ - San Francisco ("Rhythmic Hot AC") (has since shifted towards Classic hip-hop)
- KSSX - Carlsbad, California ("Rhythmic Hot AC") (has since flipped to Urban Contemporary)
- KMVK - Fort Worth, Texas
- WWVA-FM - Canton, Georgia
- WDTW-FM - Detroit, Michigan
- WDRQ - Detroit, Michigan
- WDZH-HD3 - Detroit, Michigan (leans towards classic Hip-Hop/R&B)]
- KYOT-FM - Phoenix, Arizona
- WPTY - Long Island, New York
- KUDL - Sacramento, California
- KHYL - Auburn, California
- KQMV - Bellevue, Washington
- KHTP - Tacoma, Washington
- KBKS-FM - Tacoma, Washington
- KDEY-FM - Ontario, California
- KPHT - Rocky Ford, Colorado
- KPTT - Denver, Colorado
- WBQT - Boston ("Rhythmic Hot AC")
- WQSX - Boston
- WEEI-HD2 - Boston (HD2 subcarrier of WEEI-FM; former format of predecessor WQSX)
- WHBT (now WKKV) - Racine, Wisconsin
- WAMG (now WXSS) - Wauwatosa, Wisconsin
- WKPO - Evansville, Wisconsin
- KVMX - Banks, Oregon
- KPLV - Las Vegas
- KYMV - Woodruff, Utah
- KYKA - Meadow Lakes, Alaska
- WSNA - Germantown, Tennessee
- KTFM - Floresville, Texas
- KFMK - Round Rock, Texas
- K276EL - Austin, Texas
- WNCB - Cary, North Carolina (flipped to its current country format in November 2013)
- WRGV - Pensacola, Florida
- KDEO-FM - Waipahu, Hawaii
- KHKA - Honolulu, Hawaii
- KHJZ/K256AS - Honolulu, Hawaii
- KQBT - Rio Rancho, New Mexico
- KMXW - Newton, Kansas (2004-2007; returned to format in 2015 as KKGQ)
- KKGQ - Newton, Kansas (since shifted to Hot AC)
- KEXA - King City, California
- WDVW - LaPlace, Louisiana
- WSMK - Niles, Michigan (South Bend area)
- KVBE - Hanford, California
- KOKO-FM - Kerman, California
- WZJZ - Port Charlotte, Florida
- KENR - Superior, Montana
- KBZD - Amarillo, Texas
- KFPW-FM - Barling, Arkansas
- WUSH - Poquoson, Virginia
- WMVN - East St. Louis, Illinois
- WRQQ - Hammond, Louisiana
- KNOC - Natchitoches, Louisiana ("Rhythmic throwbacks", but leaned "Urban AC" in daytime and "Mainstream urban" in nighttime), licensed canceled in January 2026, but streaming is available on air
- WTKN - Murrells Inlet, South Carolina ("Rhythmic AC", but leaned "Rhythmic Oldies")
- KWNZ - Lovelock, Nevada
- KHLR - Benton, Arkansas (More of a "Rhythmic Oldies", but leaned "Rhythmic AC")
- KKBA - Kingsville, Texas
- WLYB - Livingston, Alabama (Technically "adult hits", but leans Rhythmic AC)
- WSNP - South Bristol, New York
- K283CD - Bellmead, Texas
- CFXJ-FM - Toronto
- KQFX - Borger, Texas ("Rhythmic Hot AC")
- WZWK-LP - Greenville, South Carolina ("Rhythmic Hot AC")
- WISX - Philadelphia (leans towards classic hip hop/R&B, previously aired the format from 2006 to 2010)
- KRBQ - San Francisco
- KLBU - Santa Fe, New Mexico ("Rhythmic Hot AC")
- PWL Radio — London, United Kingdom (online only, 2004–2006)
- WROZ- Lancaster, Pennsylvania (Sold to Educational Media Foundation and is now Air1)

== See also - related formats ==
- Classic hip hop
- Rhythmic oldies
- Urban adult contemporary
- Adult contemporary
- Rhythmic contemporary
- Dance/Mix Show Airplay (Dance contemporary)
