= Stingray Radio =

Canadian radio broadcasting company

Stingray Radio Inc.
- Trade name: Newcap Radio (1986–2018)
- Formerly: Steele Communications (1980-1986); Newfoundland Capital Corporation Ltd. (1986–2018)
- Type: Subsidiary
- Industry: Media
- Founded: 1980
- Founder: Harold R. Steele
- Headquarters: Halifax, Nova Scotia
- Key people: Harold R. Steele (chairman); Rob Steele (president and CEO)
- Services: Radio broadcasting, television broadcasting
- Owner: Stingray Group
- Number of employees: 1200
- Website: www.stingray.com/radio

Stingray Radio Inc. is a Canadian radio broadcasting conglomerate owned by Stingray Group. It owns and operates 101 radio stations in Canada, making it the largest radio conglomerate in Canada. It also once owned two now-defunct television stations in Lloydminster. The majority of its stations are situated in Atlantic and Western Canada, with its largest presences being in the provinces of Alberta and Newfoundland.

The company was founded in 1986 by Harold R. Steele as Newfoundland Capital Corporation Ltd. based in Halifax, Nova Scotia, later operating under the names Newcap Broadcasting and Newcap Radio. In October 2018, Newcap was acquired by Stingray. As a result of the acquisition, the Steele family became Stingray Group's largest third-party shareholder.

== History ==
Logo of NewCap Radio

The company dates back to 1980. The group's Newfoundland and Labrador division, known as Steele Communications, included all but two of the full-power commercial stations in that province. In the past, Newfoundland Capital acted as a conglomerate with interests in diverse industries such as newspapers and freight transportation. The firm owns one asset unrelated to the broadcasting industry: a hotel in Corner Brook, the Glynmill Inn, which is operated as part of the Steele Hotels group which includes other properties held directly by the Steele family. The Steele family also has private holdings in other industries which are entirely outside of the Newcap corporate umbrella.

In 1986, NCCL received CRTC approval to acquire its first radio station, CHTN in Charlottetown, Prince Edward Island, from Northumberland Broadcasting Ltd. By 2008, Newcap would own over 70 radio stations, and flipped many radio stations from the AM band to the FM band.

In July 2008, Newcap announced a deal to trade CFDR in Halifax to Rogers Media in exchange for CIGM in Sudbury. Both stations were the sole remaining AM stations in their respective markets, and in both cases the current owner already had the maximum permitted number of FM stations in the applicable market, whereas the acquirer only had a single FM station. Both companies successfully applied to move the stations to FM as part of the trade. Newcap flipped CIGM Sudbury to FM on August 25, 2009, and Rogers flipped CFDR Halifax to FM on August 7, 2009.

On July 28, 2008, Newcap announced that it had a tentative deal to acquire 12 stations in Ontario from Haliburton Broadcasting Group, subject to CRTC approval, for $18.95 million. The company's application to acquire the Haliburton stations was formally published by the CRTC on November 13, 2008, but was subsequently withdrawn in January 2009. Newcap CEO Rob Steele indicated that in light of the credit market crisis, the company did not feel that it was the right time to increase its debt load.

In May 2011, Newcap announced that it was selling its two stations in Winnipeg, CKJS and CHNK-FM, to Evanov Communications; the sale was approved on October 24, 2011.

In January 2013, the company announced it was exploring a possible sale of its remaining broadcasting assets in Western Canada, consisting of 32 radio stations and two television stations, and six rebroadcasters associated with those stations. These stations are predominantly in Alberta (including several stations in the Lloydminster region on the Alberta/Saskatchewan border), except for two stations in British Columbia. The company announced in May 2013 it was no longer planning to sell its assets in Western Canada. If such a sale had occurred, Newcap suggested that the proceeds might be used to either fund acquisitions "closer to [Newcap's] base in Atlantic Canada", pay down debt, or return capital to shareholders.

On August 26, 2013, Newcap Radio announced it would acquire four former Astral Media radio stations in Toronto and Vancouver, including CHBM-FM, CKZZ-FM, CHHR-FM and CISL, along with Bell Media's CFXJ-FM, for $112 million. The deal was made in the wake of Bell Media's acquisition of Astral. The deal was approved by the CRTC on March 19, 2014, and the sale closed on March 31, 2014.

On April 25, 2017, Rogers Media announced its intent to acquire CISL from Newcap, who relaunched it as a Sportsnet Radio sports talk station with rights to the NHL's Vancouver Canucks.

On May 11, 2017, Newcap Radio announced its purchase of NL Broadcasting in Kamloops and its three stations, CHNL, CKRV-FM, and CJKC-FM.

On May 2, 2018, cable radio broadcaster Stingray Digital announced its intent to acquire Newcap Radio for $506 million. On October 23, 2018, the CRTC approved Stingray's application to acquire Newcap. The sale was completed just days later on October 26, 2018, with the Steele family holding the largest stake in the company besides its founders.

In 2019, Stingray began a broader strategy of networking morning and evening shows across groups of stations. This began with the syndication of CKMP/Calgary's Katie & Ed morning show as an evening show across Stingray's CHR and hot AC stations, CKGY-FM/Red Deer's The Real Wake Up with Vinnie & Randi across its country and adult hits stations in rural Alberta, the midday show The Paul McGuire Show across its country stations, and the CIGV-FM/Penticton morning show (featuring former CMT personality Casey Clarke) across Stingray's country stations in the British Columbia Interior. The morning shows incorporate inserts from local hosts. In the case of Katie & Ed, Stingray stated that the program would largely replace programming that had already been voice-tracked.

In January 2021, Stingray networked its rock stations in Atlantic Canada out of CFRQ-FM/Halifax, with all of them adopting the Q branding and airing CFRQ's morning show, in addition to the existing networked evening show Rock of the Atlantic. In late-March 2021, the company underwent a restructuring of some of its staff and local program directors, which resulted in layoffs. On April 5, 2021, Stingray launched The Morning Breeze with Brad & Deb for its The Breeze branded soft adult contemporary stations, which is networked out of CKUL-FM/Halifax and incorporates local inserts. Stingray also introduced the networked evening program Rock of the West (modelled after Rock of the Atlantic) on its rock stations in Western Canada, which is hosted by Travis Currah of CIZZ-FM/Red Deer.

In June 2023, Stingray Radio's stations joined Bell Media's iHeartRadio Canada service; it will still participate in Radioplayer Canada.

On May 13, 2025, Stingray closed its Lloydminster television stations CITL-DT and CKSA-DT, citing deteriorating economic conditions and other challenges facing the stations.

== Assets ==
The following list is based on the Canadian Radio-television and Telecommunications Commission's media ownership charts as of January 26, 2013.

=== Radio ===
City	Call Sign	Branding	Network	Format
Athabasca, Alberta	CKBA-FM	Boom 94.1	Boom	Classic hits
Blairmore, Alberta	CJPR-FM	New Country Southwest	New Country	Country
Bonnyville, Alberta	CJEG-FM	Hot 101.3	Hot	Contemporary hit radio
Brooks, Alberta	CIBQ-FM	New Country 105.7	New Country	Country
Brooks, Alberta	CIXF-FM	Boom 101.1	Boom	Classic hits
Calgary, Alberta	CFXL-FM	XL 103.1		Classic hits
Calgary, Alberta	CKMP-FM	90.3 AMP Radio		Contemporary hit radio
Calgary, Alberta	CHUP-FM	C97.7		Hot Adult Contemporary
Camrose, Alberta	CFCW	840 CFCW		Country
Camrose, Alberta	CFCW-FM	New Country 98.1	New Country	Country
Carbonear, Newfoundland and Labrador	CHVO-FM	New Country NL	New Country	Country
Channel-Port aux Basques, Newfoundland and Labrador	CFGN-FM	590 VOCM	VOCM	Full-service radio
Charlottetown, Prince Edward Island	CHTN-FM	Ocean 100		Classic hits
Charlottetown, Prince Edward Island	CKQK-FM	Hot 105.5	Hot	Contemporary hit radio
Clarenville, Newfoundland and Labrador	CKVO	590 VOCM	VOCM	Full-service radio
Cold Lake, Alberta	CJXK-FM	Boom 95.3	Boom	Classic hits
Corner Brook, Newfoundland and Labrador	CFCB	590 VOCM	VOCM	Full-service radio
Corner Brook, Newfoundland and Labrador	CKXX-FM	97.5 K-Rock	K-Rock	Classic rock
Drumheller, Alberta	CKDQ-FM	New Country 92.5	New Country	Country
Drumheller, Alberta	CHOO-FM	Boom 99.5	Boom	Classic hits
Edmonton, Alberta	CIRK-FM	K-97		Classic rock
Edmonton, Alberta	CKRA-FM	96.3 The Breeze	The Breeze	Soft adult contemporary
Edson, Alberta	CFXE-FM	New Country West	New Country	Country
Fredericton, New Brunswick	CFRK-FM	New Country 92.3	New Country	Country
Fredericton, New Brunswick	CIHI-FM	Hot 93.1	Hot	Contemporary hit radio
Gander, Newfoundland and Labrador	CKGA	590 VOCM	VOCM	Full-service radio
Gander, Newfoundland and Labrador	CKXD-FM	97.5 K-Rock	K-Rock	Classic rock
Grand Falls-Windsor, Newfoundland and Labrador	CKCM	590 VOCM	VOCM	Full-service radio
Grand Falls-Windsor, Newfoundland and Labrador	CKXG-FM	97.5 K-Rock	K-Rock	Classic rock
Halifax, Nova Scotia	CFRQ-FM	Q104	Q	Classic rock
Halifax, Nova Scotia	CKUL-FM	96.5 The Breeze	The Breeze	Soft adult contemporary
Happy Valley-Goose Bay, Newfoundland and Labrador	CFLN-FM	Big Land - Labrador's FM		News/Talk/Country/Classic hits
High Prairie, Alberta	CKVH-FM	New Country 93.5	New Country	Country
Hinton, Alberta	CFHI-FM	Boom 104.9	Boom	Classic hits
Kamloops, British Columbia	CHNL	Radio NL		Classic hits/Talk/Sports
Kamloops, British Columbia	CKRV-FM	K 97.5		Classic rock
Kamloops, British Columbia	CJKC-FM	New Country 103.1	New Country	Country
Kelowna, British Columbia	CKKO-FM	K 96.3		Classic rock
Kentville, Nova Scotia	CIJK-FM	Rewind 89.3	Rewind	Classic hits
Lac La Biche, Alberta	CILB-FM	Boom 103.5	Boom	Classic hits
Lloydminster, Alberta	CKSA-FM	New Country 95.9	New Country	Country
Lloydminster, Alberta	CILR-FM	Unlicensed travellers' information station		
Marystown, Newfoundland and Labrador	CHCM-FM	590 VOCM	VOCM	Full-service radio
Miramichi, New Brunswick	CHHI-FM	Rewind 95.9	Rewind	Classic hits
Moncton, New Brunswick	CJMO-FM	Q103	Q	Classic rock
Moncton, New Brunswick	CJXL-FM	New Country 96.9	New Country	Country
New Glasgow, Nova Scotia	CKEZ-FM	Q97.9	Q	Classic rock
New Glasgow, Nova Scotia	CKEC-FM	94.1 The Breeze	The Breeze	Soft adult contemporary
Ottawa, Ontario	CIHT-FM	Hot 89.9	Hot	Contemporary hit radio
Ottawa, Ontario	CILV-FM	Live 88.5		Alternative rock
Penticton, British Columbia	CIGV-FM	New Country 100.7	New Country	Country
Red Deer, Alberta	CKGY-FM	New Country 95.5	New Country	Country
Red Deer, Alberta	CIZZ-FM	Z 98.9		Classic rock
Saint John, New Brunswick	CHNI-FM	Q88.9	Q	Classic rock
Slave Lake, Alberta	CHSL-FM	Boom 92.7	Boom	Classic hits
St. John's, Newfoundland and Labrador	VOCM	590 VOCM	VOCM	Full-service radio
St. John's, Newfoundland and Labrador	VOCM-FM	97.5 K-Rock	K-Rock	Classic rock
St. John's, Newfoundland and Labrador	CJYQ	New Country NL	New Country	Country
St. John's, Newfoundland and Labrador	CKIX-FM	Hot 99.1	Hot	Contemporary hit radio
St. Paul, Alberta	CHSP-FM	New Country 97.7	New Country	Country
Stephenville, Newfoundland and Labrador	CFSX	590 VOCM	VOCM	Full-service radio
Stettler, Alberta	CKSQ-FM	New Country 93.3	New Country	Country
Sudbury, Ontario	CHNO-FM	Rewind 103.9	Rewind	Classic hits
Sudbury, Ontario	CIGM-FM	Hot 93.5	Hot	Contemporary hit radio
Sydney, Nova Scotia	CHRK-FM	Hot 101.9	Hot	Contemporary hit radio
Sydney, Nova Scotia	CKCH-FM	New Country 103.5	New Country	Country
Toronto, Ontario	CFXJ-FM	New Country 93.5	New Country	Country
Toronto, Ontario	CHBM-FM	Boom 97.3	Boom	Classic hits
Vancouver, British Columbia	CHLG-FM	104.3 The Breeze	The Breeze	Soft adult contemporary
Vancouver, British Columbia	CKZZ-FM	Z 95.3		Hot adult contemporary
Wainwright, Alberta	CKKY-FM	Boom 101.9	Boom	Classic hits
Wainwright, Alberta	CKWY-FM	Hot 93.7	Hot	Contemporary hit radio
Westlock, Alberta	CKWB-FM	New Country 97.9	New Country	Country
Wetaskiwin, Alberta	CKJR	Sports 1440		Sports talk
Whitecourt, Alberta	CFXW-FM	Boom 96.7	Boom	Classic hits

=== 3937844 Canada Inc. ===
The numbered company 3937844 Canada Inc., a partnership between Newcap and Standard Broadcasting, was the licensee for most of the Alberta stations listed above from 2002, when Standard acquired the stations from Telemedia, until 2007, when Newcap bought out Standard's share of the stations.
