= Media in Fredericton =

This is a list of media in Fredericton, New Brunswick.

== Television ==
- Channel 4.1 (cable 3): CBAT-DT, CBC (licensed to Saint John, with studios in Fredericton)
- Channel 9.1 (cable 8): CKLT-DT, CTV (Saint John)
- Channel 11.1 (cable 6): CHNB-DT, Global (Saint John; semi-satellite of CIHF-DT Halifax)

== Radio ==
- 1260 AM - CKHJ, "Pure Country" country music
- 90.5 FM - CJPN-FM, French language community
- 92.3 FM - CFRK-FM, "New Country 92.3" country
- 93.1 FM - CIHI-FM, "Rewind 93.1" classic hits
- 93.3 FM - CIRC-FM, automated local information (defunct)
- 94.7 FM - CJRI-FM, gospel music
- 95.7 FM - CKTP-FM, mixed format, owned by the St. Mary's First Nation
- 96.5 FM - CIXN-FM, "Joy FM" Contemporary Christian music
- 97.9 FM - CHSR-FM, University of New Brunswick & St. Thomas University campus/community radio
- 99.5 FM - CBZF-FM, CBC Radio One
- 105.3 FM - CFXY-FM, "Bounce 105.3" adult hits
- 106.9 FM - CIBX-FM, "Move 106.9" adult contemporary

CBC Music (CBZ-FM 101.5) and both Radio-Canada services (Ici Radio-Canada Première CBAF-FM-1 102.3 and Ici Musique CBAL-FM-4 88.1) are provided from transmitters in Saint John. Other stations from Saint John and Presque Isle, Maine can also be heard in Fredericton.

== Print ==
The Daily Gleaner is published in Fredericton as a city daily and there are also three weekly newspapers available. The Telegraph-Journal, based in Saint John, publishes a provincial edition and has a bureau in Fredericton. Moncton's Times & Transcript operates a news bureau from the Legislative Press Gallery. Furthermore, the students at the University of New Brunswick and St. Thomas University both publish their own weekly papers - The Brunswickan and The Aquinian respectively - which are distributed in public areas on campus and in the city in general. In recent years, Fredericton has seen a growth in alternative and independent media newspapers.

== Online ==
- https://nouzie.com/ - Nouzie helps individuals, organizations & non-profits with accessing local news, events and community information without the need to search the internet.
