= Media in Kamloops =

This is a list of media in Kamloops, British Columbia.

== Radio ==
Frequency	Call sign	Branding	Format	Owner	Notes
610 AM	CHNL	Radio NL - News, Talk, Sports	news/talk	Stingray Radio	English
92.5 FM	CFBX-FM	The X	campus radio	Thompson Rivers University	
94.1 FM	CBYK-FM	CBC Radio One	news/talk	Canadian Broadcasting Corporation	English
96.5 FM	CBUF-FM-6	Ici Radio-Canada Première	news/talk	Canadian Broadcasting Corporation	French; repeats CBUF-FM Vancouver
97.5 FM	CKRV-FM	K97.5	classic rock	Stingray Radio	English
98.3 FM	CIFM-FM	98.3 CIFM	active rock	Jim Pattison Group	English
100.1 FM	CKBZ-FM	B100	adult contemporary	Jim Pattison Group	English
101.9 FM	CBPL-FM	WeatherRadio	Weather	Canadian Broadcasting Corporation (owner); Weatheradio Canada (operator)	English / French
103.1 FM	CJKC-FM	New Country 103.1	country	Stingray Radio	English
105.3 FM	CBU-FM-4	CBC Music	Public/Music	Canadian Broadcasting Corporation	English; repeats CBU-FM Vancouver

== Television ==
The incumbent cable television provider is Shaw Communications.

OTA virtual channel (PSIP)	OTA channel	Shaw Cable	Call Sign	Network	Notes
–	4 (VHF)	7	CFJC-TV	City (affiliate)	Former CBC Television affiliate
22.1	22 (UHF)	8	CHKM-DT	Global	Rebroadcaster of CHAN-DT (Vancouver)

Kamloops is not designated as a mandatory market for digital television conversion. The Kamloops area does not receive CBC Television, Ici Radio-Canada Télé, or CTV over the air.

== Print ==
The city's main daily newspaper was the Kamloops Daily News which ceased publication in 2014. The city is also home to Kamloops This Week, a free newspaper which publishes two times a week.

== Digital ==
The city has three websites covering daily news in the Kamloops market: KamloopsMatters, infoNEWS, and KamloopsBCNow. In 2022 a digital media outlet called The Wren launched.
