= CFNB =

CFNB may refer to:

- CFNB-FM, a radio station (97.5 FM) licensed to D'Arcy, British Columbia, Canada
- CIBX-FM, a radio station (106.9 FM) licensed to Fredericton, New Brunswick, Canada, which held the call sign CFNB from 1926 to 1996
