= CFHI-FM =

Radio station in Hinton, Alberta, Canada

- Hinton, Alberta; Canada
- Broadcast area: Yellowhead County
- Frequency: 104.9 MHz
- Branding: Boom 104.9

Programming
- Format: Classic hits

Ownership
- Owner: Stingray Group

History
- First air date: February 2017
- Call sign meaning: Hinton (broadcast area)

Technical information
- Class: B1
- ERP: 1,100 watts

Links
- Webcast: Listen Live
- Website: boom1049.com

CFHI-FM (Boom 104.9) is a classic hits radio station which is heard on 104.9 FM in Hinton, Alberta, Canada.

The station was owned by Newcap Radio (now Stingray Group), who was granted the broadcast license for a new radio station in Hinton on February 20, 2014. The license originally called for the station to have a classic rock format. CFHI signed on the air in test mode in January 2017. The station launched in early February 2017 under the name Real Country 104.9, as the latest in Newcap Radio's "Real Country" network. On July 7, 2017, the station changed its branding to Boom 104.9. The "Real Country" brand was shifted to its sister station CFXE-FM.
