= CFLN =

CFLN may refer to:

- CFLN-FM, a radio station licensed to Goose Bay, Newfoundland and Labrador, Canada
- French Committee of National Liberation
