= CIHT =

CIHT may refer to:

- Chartered Institution of Highways and Transportation
- CIHT-FM
