= Zoo Legacy =

Canadian band

Zoo Legacy is a hip-hop/indie-rock band from Ottawa, Ontario, Canada. Formed in 2010, the band consists of brothers Samuel (keyboards, guitars, vocals) and Dominic Goss (guitars). After successfully recording a demo of material, the brothers enlisted the talents of friend and local rapper Nicholas Pouponneau in the summer of 2010, who began rapping verses over the instrumental tracks they had previously written. They obtained their name by combining the previous stage name of Pouponneau (Young Legacy) and a neighborhood park the Goss brothers spent time in visiting family in South Africa (Zoo Lake). Throughout the years, they have shared the stage with acts such as Lauryn Hill, Kardinal Offishall, Classified, Shad, Ubiquitous Synergy Seeker, Son Real and Bad Bad Not Good. Their sound has been likened to artists such as The Weekend, The XX and Atmosphere.

== History ==
=== Formation and early years (2011–2012) ===
In October 2011, the band added Mark Milloy (drums) to its roster, who had been introduced to the band's members through a mutual acquaintance. After building up a repertoire of new music, which included input from new members Poupponeau and Milloy, the band began playing gigs in the National Capital Region and beyond. Early reviews of the band's music were positive; their song Shockwave was listed as a "best local song" of the year in the Ottawa Citizen. The Guardian (UK) also featured Zoo Legacy's track Shockwave on its website. Positive press continued with inclusion of their track "Never" on the Before The Biggs compilation Best You've Never Heard Volume 5.

2012 found the band playing in Toronto for the NXNE festival, as well as the JunoFest in Ottawa, in support of the 2012 Juno Awards ceremony. The band's biggest show to date was at the 2012 RBC Royal Bank Ottawa Bluesfest, when they opened for Lauryn Hill. Other acts playing the same day included Snoop Dogg and ASAP Rocky. Wrapping up a successful year, in a 'best-of' poll for 2012, Zoo Legacy was in the top 20 songs of Ottawa artists as rated by the Ottawa Citizen. Earlier that year, the Citizen had referred to Zoo Legacy as being a part of Ottawa's 'golden age of hip hop'. Ottawa Xpress also included Zoo Legacy on their 'Sounds of Ottawa' 2012 list. Outside of their home turf, Zoo Legacy was also honored by receiving the "Best Urban Act" award from the Toronto Independent Music Awards. Additionally, they were featured on the blog 1 Love T.O. and Canadian music channel MuchMusic.

=== 2013–2015 ===
In April 2013, they played at the acclaimed Soho House in Toronto with up-and-coming rappers The Airplane Boys. In June, the band's music was featured in the trailer for the film Liars All, in addition to being featured on the blog of Drake's producer, Boi-1da. Later that year, the band were finalists in the Live 88.5 ran Big Money Shot competition, an endeavour that had the band working with acclaimed producer Tomi Swick (Barenaked Ladies).

After a successful Kickstarter campaign in the spring of 2014, the band temporarily re-located to Brooklyn to record with producer Gus van Go, notable for his work with the band The Stills and Hollerado. The band played the Canadian Music Week, the Canadian Tulip Festival, and the newly formed E.L.E. Music Festival, which is hosted annually at the University of Ottawa. Their performance at the E.L.E. festival was included by CBC as a top 4 music show to see that weekend. They also undertook their first Ontario tour, named the "Flight Risk Tour", with stops in Toronto, Kingston, London, Sault Ste. Marie, Kitchener, and Ottawa, with an out-of-province date in Montreal, Quebec.

2015 commenced with the finishing of the Departures EP, with recording occurring at Audio Valley Studios in Ottawa, Ontario. Shortly after, the band released a rework of the Hudson Mohawke track "Chimes". Their February show with BadBadNotGood in Ottawa was once again billed by CBC.ca as a 'Top 4 Show to see in Ottawa This Week'. In May 2015, the band performed at the Bronson Centre with Shad for a second time.

Over the past five years, Zoo Legacy's music has been featured on radio stations like New York City's Hot97, Montreal's 94.7 Hits FM, SiriusXM's, "The Verge", Ottawa's Live 88.5 and CKCU-FM, and CBC Radio 1. Zoo Legacy has also released official music videos for the songs "L.K.U.T." (2012), "Echo" (2013), "CRWD" (2014), and "She'll Never Fall in Love" (2015).

== Members ==
- Nicholas Pouponneau (vocals)
- Dominic Goss (guitar)
- Samuel Goss (guitar/keys/percussion)
- Mark Milloy (bass)
- Andrew Hunt (drums)

== Discography ==
=== EPs ===
- 2011: Zoo Legacy
- 2013: City Light Glow
- 2015: Departures
