= CHSL-FM =

Radio station in Slave Lake, Alberta

- Slave Lake, Alberta; Canada
- Frequency: 92.7 MHz
- Branding: Boom 92.7

Programming
- Format: Classic hits

Ownership
- Owner: Stingray Group

History
- First air date: November 1, 1985
- Former call signs: CKWA
- Call sign meaning: Classic Hits Slave Lake (format and broadcast area)

Technical information
- Class: B
- ERP: 5,000 watts
- HAAT: 354.3 metres (1,162 ft)
- Transmitter coordinates: 55.4717°N 114.786°W
- Repeater: CHSL-FM-1 94.3 Wabasca

Links
- Website: boom927.com

CHSL-FM (Boom 92.7), formerly CKWA, is a Canadian radio station broadcasting at 92.7 FM in Slave Lake, Alberta. It started out as an AM oldies station. The station's ownership would change over the years. Some of the station's owners included OK Radio Group, Nornet, OSG, and Telemedia. It was eventually purchased by Newcap Broadcasting (now Stingray Group).

== History ==
In 1985, the station received approval by the CRTC to broadcast on the frequency 1210 kHz and began broadcasting as CKWA in November the same year. Some time in the 90s, the station was rebranded as Cat Country 1210 CKWA. The station was a part of a network of small town Alberta stations that featured local weekday morning shows and network announcers out of Edmonton for the rest of the time. Like its sister stations in Athabasca, Westlock and High Prairie, it was operated at a low cost and often ridiculed in the community for its poor signal, bad programming, technical problems and lack of local focus. Because of its call letters of CKWA, the station soon gained the nickname The Squaw.

In September 2006, NewCap officially disbanded the "Cat Country" network, and relaunched the radio station from a state-of-the-art studio as 92.7 FM The Fox. It was given the new call letters CHSL, standing for Classic Hits Slave Lake. CHSL is tied in heavily with its new regional head office in Edson. It also is the only former "Cat Country" station that relaunched in 2006 with an FM signal. CHSL rebranded in 2010 with the new name 92.7 Lake FM.

In May 2011, the studio and offices were destroyed by the Slave Lake wildfire. This happened after a power outage that affected the transmitter and studio. While broadcasts on the station's frequency were provided by CFXE-FM in Edson, engineers spent over 2 weeks working on the studio's new location above a video store on Main Street in Slave Lake. Their slogan was changed to "The Spirit of Slave Lake".

In May 2013, the station received approval by the CRTC to operate a new FM repeater at Wabasca, operating at 94.3 MHz. In July 2017, the station rebranded to classic hits as Boom 92.7.
