= CHRK-FM =

Radio station in Sydney, Nova Scotia, Canada

Coordinates: 46°05′55″N 60°18′41″W

- Sydney, Nova Scotia; Canada
- Broadcast area: Cape Breton Island
- Frequency: 101.9 MHz
- Branding: Hot 101.9

Programming
- Format: Contemporary hit radio

Ownership
- Owner: Stingray Group
- Sister stations: CKCH-FM

History
- First air date: May 27, 2008

Technical information
- Class: C
- ERP: 58,000 watts
- HAAT: 169 metres (554 ft)

Links
- Webcast: Listen live
- Website: hot1019.ca

CHRK-FM is a radio station broadcasting from Sydney, Nova Scotia, Canada, at 101.9 FM owned by Stingray Group. The station is one of several radio stations approved in 2007 for the Atlantic Provinces. It is also one of two radio stations for the Cape Breton region along with sister station CKCH-FM.

== History ==
The station began a required three week Industry Canada testing period on May 15, 2008, and officially launched on May 27, at 8 a.m., with the first song being "4 Minutes" by Madonna. It was branded 101.9 The Giant until May 21, 2021, when it rebranded as Hot 101.9. The station's format is contemporary hit radio.

CHRK was formerly a call sign for CKRV-FM in Kamloops, British Columbia from 1984 to 1993 and short term call-sign of radio station CJAQ-FM in Calgary, Alberta between 1999 and 2002.
