= Harry Steele (businessman) =

Canadian businessman (1929–2022)

- Born: June 9, 1929; Musgrave Harbour, Dominion of Newfoundland, British Empire
- Died: January 28, 2022 (aged 92); St. John's, Newfoundland and Labrador, Canada
- Occupation: Businessman
- Children: 3; including Rob
- Awards: Order of Canada, Doctor of Laws (honoris causa, Saint Mary's University)

Harold Raymond Steele, OC (June 9, 1929 – January 28, 2022) was a Newfoundland-born Canadian businessman, entrepreneur, and officer in the Royal Canadian Navy. He had business ventures in transportation, hotels and radio, most notably Newfoundland Capital Corporation and Eastern Provincial Airways.

== Early life ==
Steele was born in Musgrave Harbour, Dominion of Newfoundland, on June 9, 1929 to Stanley Steele, a contractor with the Anglo-Newfoundland Development Company, and his wife, Kathleen "Katie" Steele [née Power]. He studied at Memorial University of Newfoundland, graduating with a Bachelor of Arts in Education in 1953. He then joined the Royal Canadian Navy to meet his obligations with the University Naval Training Division, the program that helped fund his education. He quickly rose to the rank of lieutenant commander and was assigned to Washington, D.C., as a military attaché for four years. He was subsequently put in charge of the new military communications research centre in Gander in 1970, where he was commander of the NATO base for four years before retiring from the Navy after 24 years of service.

== Career ==
Steele started investing in the stock market during the late 1950s, when he was a teacher at the Maritime Warfare School in Halifax. He also ventured into real estate, purchasing the Albatross Hotel in Gander with his wife during a bankruptcy sale around that time. Shortly before retiring from the navy, he started purchasing shares in Eastern Provincial Airways (EPA), which was losing money at the time. Steele foresaw that the provincial government's newly announced hydro projects in Labrador would bring about more demand for flights to the region. He briefly served as its vice-president of marketing, before purchasing 67% of the airline's shares to become its majority shareholder in the mid-1970s. He introduced numerous reforms to EPA, which included reducing the number of flight attendants by a third, staving off pilots' strikes and threats of strike from other personnel, successfully lobbying to obtain a portion of the Halifax–Toronto direct route from rivals CP Air, and introducing a profit-sharing plan for employees. He ultimately sold the company to CP Air in 1984 for C$20 million, reversing the $815,000 operating loss EPA recorded the year he purchased it.

Steele established Newfoundland Capital Corporation (NCC) in 1981. During the early 1980s, he bought the Q Radio network. He subsequently obtained a controlling interest in Halifax Daily News in 1984, before buying CHTN-FM in Charlottetown two years later. In a surprise move, he acquired the VOCM Radio Network during the late 1990s. He was succeeded as chairman of NCC by his son Rob in 2000. The company subsequently sold its assets in printing and publishing two years later, enabling Steele to withdraw from its day-to-day management and retire. However, NCC retained its radio assets until November 2018, when they were sold to Stingray Digital Group for $523 million. In a separate transaction, Steele purchased $25 million worth of shares in Stingray.

Despite retiring, Steele continued to visit the Albatross Hotel whenever he was in town until around 2018. The hotel ultimately remained under his ownership until his death. He also owned Universal Helicopters for over three decades until selling it in 2013.

== Awards and honours ==
Steele was named Memorial University's first Alumnus of the Year in 1982. The following year, he was awarded the degree of Doctor of Laws (honoris causa) from Saint Mary's University. Steele was appointed an officer of the Order of Canada in November 1991 and invested in April of the following year. He was inducted into the Nova Scotia Business Hall of Fame in 1998, and into the Newfoundland and Labrador Business Hall of Fame in 2000. He was awarded the Queen Elizabeth II Golden Jubilee Medal in 2002, and the Queen Elizabeth II Diamond Jubilee Medal in 2012. He received the Ernst & Young Atlantic Lifetime Achievement Award in 2003. The Steele Ocean Sciences Building at Dalhousie University and Steele Community Centre in Gander are named in his honour.

== Personal life ==
Steele was married to Catherine Thornhill until his death. She was a music teacher and graduate of Mount Allison University, and they met while he was studying at Memorial University. Together, they had three children: Peter, Rob, and John.

Steele resided in Gander in his retirement. He died on January 28, 2022, in St. John's, Newfoundland and Labrador. He was 92 years old.

== See also ==
- List of people of Newfoundland and Labrador
