= Rob Steele (businessman) =

Canadian businessman

- Born: Robert G. Steele; 1961 (age 64–65); Halifax, Nova Scotia, Canada
- Education: Memorial University of Newfoundland (BA)
- Occupation: Businessman
- Known for: Founder and CEO of Steele Auto Group
- Family: Harry Steele (father); Roland Thornhill (uncle)

Robert G. Steele (born 1961) is a Canadian businessman who is the founder and CEO of Steele Auto Group.

== Early life and education ==
Rob Steele was born in 1961 in Halifax, Nova Scotia to parents Harry R. Steele and Catherine J. Steele. He was raised in Newfoundland and Labrador. His father was a well-known and successful businessman in Canada with interests in various sectors, and his mother was a musician and music teacher. Steele attended Memorial University of Newfoundland, graduating in 1983 with a Bachelor of Arts.

== Career ==
After graduating from university, Steele began his career in business, focusing on the automobile industry. In 1990, he sold off his interests in the local franchise of Auto Trader magazine, using those funds to purchase his first automobile dealership. He thus established Steele Auto Group, which grew into a network of 17 dealerships with about 900 employees by 2015.

Steele joined the Newfoundland Capital Corporation's board of directors in 1997, becoming the president and CEO in 2001. During his time leading the company, it rebranded as Newcap Radio, and in 2014 purchased five stations in Toronto and Vancouver. Newcap was acquired by Stingray Radio in 2018 for CA$506 million.

In 2016, Steele acquired Colonial Honda on Robie Street in Halifax. Soon after, he purchased nearly all of the residential properties adjacent to the dealership, with demolition permits then issued for 17 houses. After the plan to demolish the houses for "additional inventory display" was revealed, locals started a petition against it, which garnered over 1,700 signatures. Throughout the ordeal, Steele denied requests for interviews from the media and refused to meet with residents. A blogger who wrote an article about the event titled "Steele Group Launches Hondas Not Homes Campaign" received a cease-and-desist letter from Steele's lawyer the same day it was published, leading him to delete the article. The demolition proceeded as planned, and in 2020 applications were made for the demolition of three more houses adjacent to the dealership.

Steele was appointed as the campaign chair of Dalhousie University's Performing Arts Campaign in 2018. Later that year, he donated CA$2 million to the campaign.

== Wealth ==
Steele is a multi-millionaire. He purchased the Halifax mansion of the gold mining executive Brad Langille in 2018, for a cost of CA$7.2 million. Built in 2010, the seven-storey mansion has five bedrooms, ten bathrooms, an elevator, in-home theatre, and an office suite, for a total of 11,000 square feet of space. The property has a two-bedroom guest house and a two-bedroom pool house adjacent to an inground swimming pool, as well as a greenhouse and fitness area. Steele also owns a house in Texas.

In 2020, Steele purchased a vintage yacht used by the famous stunt performer Evel Knievel. The boat was listed for sale at US$349,000, but Steele did not disclose the purchase price. The boat was purchased new by Knievel in 1976 for $650,000, and only remained in his possession for about three years. Also in 2020, Steele donated CA$2 million to the Sobey School of Business.

Steele is a collector of classic cars. He established the Steele Wheels Motor Museum in Halifax in 2023 after acquiring an array of interesting and unique vehicles.

== Personal life ==
Steele is married to Mary Beth MacKenzie. Their two-day wedding event in Texas was attended by Ronnie Wood of the Rolling Stones. He is a close friend of the Canadian merchant banker Michael Wekerle.

== Awards and honours ==
- Canadian Broadcast Industry Hall of Fame (2016)
- Honorary Doctor of Commerce from Saint Mary's University (2018)
- Nova Scotia Business Hall of Fame (2018)
- King Charles III Coronation Medal (2025)
