= CKWB-FM =

Radio station in Westlock, Alberta

Coordinates: 54°06′29″N 114°04′22″W

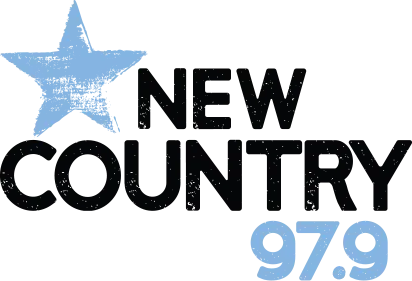
- Westlock, Alberta; Canada
- Frequency: 97.9 MHz
- Branding: New Country 97.9

Programming
- Format: Country
- Affiliations: Westwood One

Ownership
- Owner: Stingray Group

History
- First air date: 1971, as a rebroadcaster of CKBA-FM
- Former call signs: CFOK (1971–2011)
- Former frequencies: 1370 kHz (1971–2011)
- Call sign meaning: Westlock Barrhead

Technical information
- Class: B
- ERP: 27,000 watts

Links
- Webcast: Listen Live
- Website: newcountry979.ca

CKWB-FM (97.9 MHz) is a Canadian radio station in Westlock, Alberta. The station also serves the Barrhead area. The station currently airs a country format branded on-air as New Country 97.9 and was owned by Newcap Radio until they were bought out by Stingray Group.

== History ==
It's uncertain when the station signed on as CFOK, however, the station dates back to the 1971 as a rebroadcaster of CKBA-FM.

On December 24, 1974, Charest Communications Ltd. (the original owners) was granted a licence to operate a new AM radio station on 1370 kHz at Westlock with a power of 10,000 watts (directional at night).

Over the years, the station has gone through different brandings, formats and ownerships.

== Move to FM ==
On October 8, 2009, CFOK applied to convert to 97.9 MHz. The station received CRTC approval on February 19, 2010.

In August 2011, CFOK began testing on their new frequency at 97.9 MHz. After the official launch of the new station on 97.9 FM, the station's call sign would be CKWB-FM.

On September 6, 2011, at 6:00 am MDT, CFOK dropped its classic hits format and made its official move to 97.9 MHz as 97.9 The Range with its new call sign CKWB-FM and a country format. CFOK's old AM 1370 transmitter was shut down.

Previous logo

In November 2016, CKWB rebranded under the Real Country brand, as with other Newcap-owned country stations in Alberta.

On March 4, 2024, CKWB rebranded as New Country 97.9 to match the company’s other country music stations.
