= Boom FM =

Branding of Canadian radio stations airing a classic hits format

- Type: Radio network
- Country: Canada
- Headquarters: Toronto, Ontario, Canada

Programming
- Language(s): English; French (formerly)
- Format: Classic hits Adult hits Oldies

Ownership
- Owner: Bell Media Radio (Bell Media)

History
- Founded: by Astral Media
- Launch date: May 1, 2003

Links
- Website: (see each station’s articles)

Boom FM is a branding of classic hits radio stations broadcasting in Canada. The trademark is owned by Bell Media, formerly Bell Media owned two stations using the branding, until it was sold to Arsenal Media as part of the company's restructuring.

The name "Boom" is a reference to baby boomers, who are the main target of the network.

== History ==
"Boom" was first launched on May 1, 2003 as a network of French-language oldies stations, and originally included CFEI-FM and CHRD-FM. CFVM-FM and CFZZ-FM joined the network in 2005 after these stations were acquired by Astral Media from Corus Entertainment. All four stations previously had an adult contemporary format. Since Astral Media already has two FM stations in each of Quebec's larger markets, it is impossible for them under current Canadian Radio-television and Telecommunications Commission (CRTC) regulations to launch Boom FM stations in these markets without dumping either the Énergie or the Rouge FM format, both of which are very successful according to Bureau of Broadcast Measurement (BBM) ratings.

On December 26, 2009, "Boom" added its first English-language affiliate, CHBM-FM in Toronto, Ontario, which flipped from its longtime adult contemporary EZ Rock format (as CJEZ-FM) to adult hits under the Boom 97.3 name. It was the only Boom FM station not using the classic hits format, though its logo uses the same lettering and 45 RPM plastic insert device as its Quebec counterparts. Owner Stingray Radio, however, currently markets the station's format as classic hits.

On June 30, 2011, "Boom" added its second English-language affiliate, CJOT-FM in Ottawa which flipped from the very same adult contemporary of the former CJEZ-FM Toronto as EZ Rock to the classic hits format as Boom 99.7.

Following Bell Media's approval in 2013 to acquire Astral Media, a condition was placed in which that it must divest itself of several television services and radio stations, including CHBM and CJOT, which were placed in a blind trust pending its eventual sales. CJOT would be sold Corus Radio in March 2013, while CHBM was sold to Stingray Radio in August 2013. Corus' acquisition of CJOT-FM was approved on January 31, 2014, while Stingray's acquisition of CHBM-FM was approved on March 19, 2014. Despite differing ownership, both stations continue to use the Boom FM name and logo.

On August 25, 2014, Corus' CJSS-FM in Cornwall became the newest station in Ontario to be affiliated with the network.

In 2017, Stingray Radio gained permission from Bell Media to begin using the Boom brand and its content in Alberta. In July 2017, several of Stingray's rural Alberta stations took on the Boom format.

In May 2018, Boom 104.1 Saint-Jean-sur-Richelieu and Boom 106.5 Saint-Hyacinthe has changed to an adult contemporary format.

On February 8, 2024, Bell announced a restructuring that included the sale of 45 of its 103 radio stations to seven buyers, subject to approval by the CRTC, including CFZZ and CFEI, which was to be sold to Arsenal Media. On March 11, 2025 the CRTC approved the sale to Arsenal Media.

On April 22, 2025, all of the French Boom affiliates have disbanded to affiliate with the O network by Arsenal Media, this means that the original Boom affiliates are gone and the English Boom affiliates are what is left of Boom FM.

== Stations ==
Station ID	Frequency	City	Province	Language	Owner
CHBM-FM	97.3	Toronto	Ontario	English	Stingray Radio
CJOT-FM	99.7	Ottawa	Ontario	English	Corus Entertainment
CJSS-FM	101.9	Cornwall	Ontario	English	Corus Entertainment
CJXK-FM	95.3	Cold Lake	Alberta	English	Stingray Radio
CKKY-FM	101.9	Wainwright	Alberta	English	Stingray Radio
CILB-FM	103.5	Lac La Biche	Alberta	English	Stingray Radio
CKBA-FM	94.1	Athabasca	Alberta	English	Stingray Radio
CHSL-FM	92.7	Slave Lake	Alberta	English	Stingray Radio
CIXF-FM	101.1	Brooks	Alberta	English	Stingray Radio
CFXW-FM	96.7	Whitecourt/Fox Creek	Alberta	English	Stingray Radio
CFHI-FM	104.9	Hinton	Alberta	English	Stingray Radio
CHOO-FM	99.5	Drumheller	Alberta	English	Stingray Radio

=== Former stations ===
- Amqui, Quebec - CFVM-FM (switched to RockDétente in 2008; now Rouge FM)
- Drummondville, Quebec - CHRD-FM (switched to RockDétente in 2008; now Rouge FM)
- Saint-Hyacinthe, Quebec - CFEI-FM (switched to O network in 2025)
- Saint-Jean-sur-Richelieu, Quebec - CFZZ-FM (switched to O network in 2025)

=== Unrealised station ===
CKSM AM 1220 of Shawinigan, Quebec was originally announced in April 2007 to have been a new affiliate of Boom, with plans to relocate the station to the FM band. However, the plans never materialised, and the station, which at the time was owned by Astral but rebroadcast then-Corus owned CHLN 550 AM of Trois-Rivières, closed down on June 30, 2007.

=== Other ===
Stingray's CHNO-FM in Sudbury, Ontario, CIJK-FM in Kentville, Nova Scotia, and CHHI-FM in Miramichi, New Brunswick are branded as Rewind instead of Boom, but otherwise resemble Boom FM stations with a similar logo design, a similar classic hits format and some shared programming. CIHI-FM in Fredericton, New Brunswick was also branded as Rewind until March 2024 when the station flipped to Top 40/CHR with Stingray's HOT brand.
