= CFGN-FM =

Radio station in Newfoundland and Labrador, Canada

Coordinates: 47°35′08″N 59°07′19″W

- Port aux Basques, Newfoundland and Labrador; Canada
- Frequency: 96.7 MHz
- Branding: 590 VOCM

Programming
- Format: Full-service radio

Ownership
- Owner: Stingray Group

History
- First air date: August 7, 1971 (as a repeater of CFSX); 1973 (as a separate station)
- Former call signs: CFGN (1971–2017)
- Former frequencies: 1230 kHz (1971–2017)
- Call sign meaning: Coming From the Gateway to Newfoundland

Links
- Website: vocm.com

CFGN-FM is an FM radio station in Port aux Basques, Newfoundland and Labrador, Canada, broadcasting at 96.7 MHz. Originally launched as a repeater on August 7, 1971 at 1230 kHz, it opened its own studios in 1973. In 1996, it became a repeater of CFSX. The station is owned by Stingray Group.

CFGN carries the entire VOCM lineup except for a block of programming from CFCB on weekday mornings and for a six-hour block on Saturday mornings.

CFGN also has a repeater in St. Andrew's, CFCV-FM at 97.7 MHz.

On April 2, 2001, the sale of Humber Valley Broadcasting Co. Ltd. to Newcap Inc. was approved. This included CFGN and other radio stations such as:

- CFCB Corner Brook
- CFDL-FM Deer Lake
- CFNW Port-aux-Choix
- CFNN-FM St. Anthony
- CFSX Stephenville
- CFCV-FM St. Andrew's
- CFLN Goose Bay
- CFLW Wabush
- CFLC-FM Churchill Falls

On December 12, 2016, Newcap received CRTC approval to convert CFGN from the AM band at 1230 kHz to the FM band 96.7 MHz. The move was completed on November 1, 2017, and the old AM transmitter was shut down.
