= Steele Wheels Motor Museum =

Automotive museum in Nova Scotia

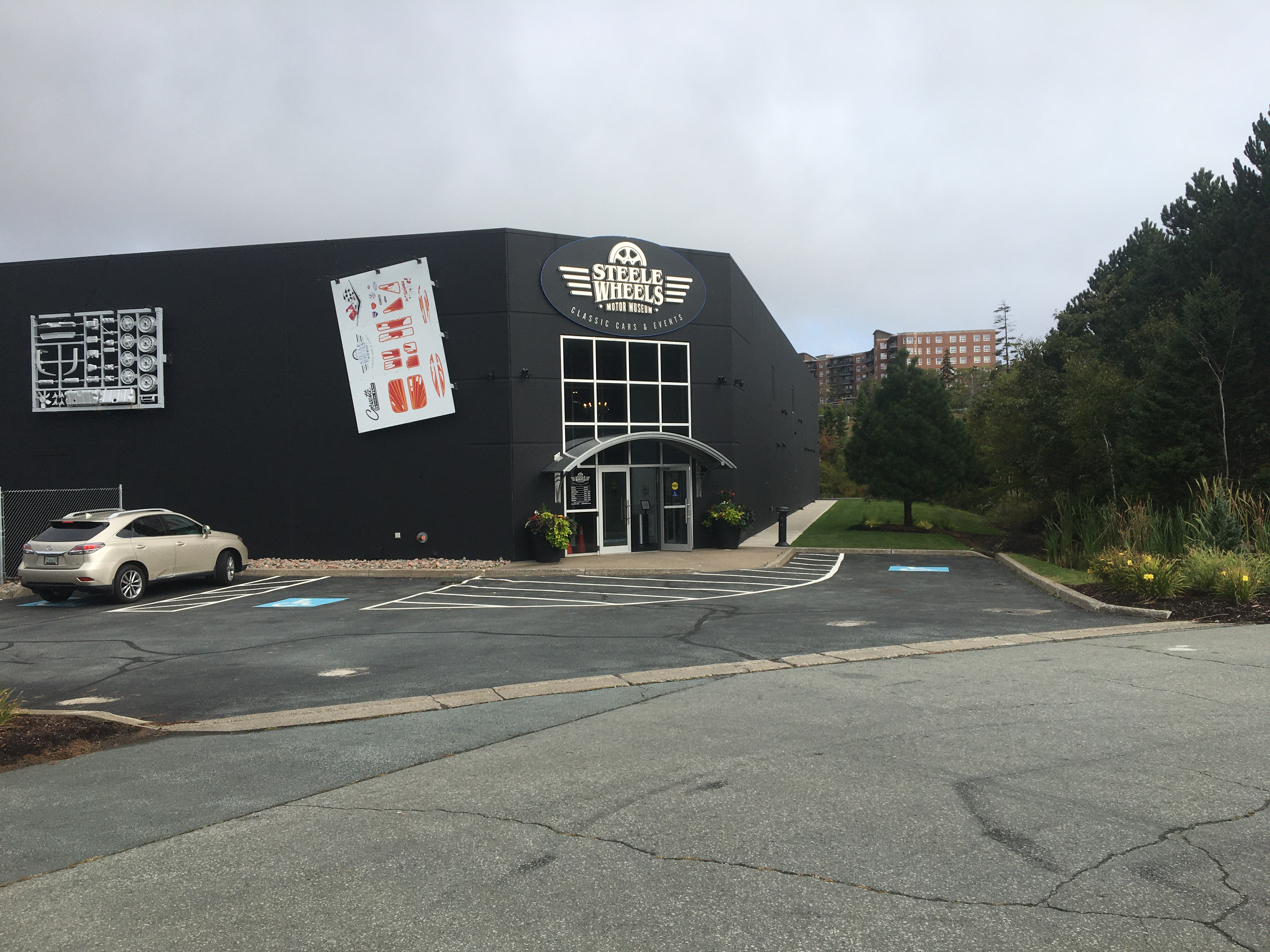
- Museum entrance
- Established: 20 May 2023
- Location: Halifax, Nova Scotia, Canada
- Coordinates: 44.648°N 63.669°W
- Type: Automotive museum
- Founder: Rob Steele
- Website: steelewheels.ca

The Steele Wheels Motor Museum is an automotive museum and dealership in the Canadian province of Nova Scotia, located in the city of Halifax.

== History ==
The Steele Wheels Motor Museum officially opened on 20 May 2023 at 66 Otter Lake Court in Halifax, with an inventory of 64 cars and over 25 motorcycles. The museum was founded by Rob Steele, the CEO of Steele Auto Group, featuring vehicles that he acquired over the prior few years. Initially, the motor museum was planned to be a classic car dealership, but Steele wanted the public to have the opportunity to see the rare vehicles. Almost every vehicle within the Steele Wheels Motor Museum is available to be purchased.

== Exhibits ==
Upon opening, the oldest vehicle in the Steele Wheels Motor Museum was a 1923 REO Speed Wagon. Other vehicles in the museum's collection at the time included a 1957 DeSoto Fireflite Convertible in coral, a 1948 Chrysler Town and Country with Honduran mahogany trim, a replica DeLorean, a replica General Lee, and a Mazda RX-7 which appeared in the first Fast & Furious film. The Steele Wheels Motor Museum also features an arcade, a drive-in movie theatre, and other entertainment.

In 2024, the museum exhibited three vehicles used by the professional driver Garry Sowerby during his Guinness World Record-setting drives.
