= Jacquie Neville =

Canadian singer

Jacquie Neville (born October 21, 1987) is an Ottawa-born singer, songwriter and producer. From 2009 to 2017 she performed as the frontwoman of the Balconies. In 2022 she released her debut solo album If You Get Lonely.

== Career ==
Neville began her music career in 2007 with the formation of the Balconies, a band she formed with her brother, Steven Neville, and Liam Jaeger. As a trio the group released the albums The Balconies (2009), and Fast Motions (2014). In 2015 Steven Neville announced his departure from the band. As a duo the Balconies would go on to release two more albums, Rhonda (2016) and Show You (2017). In 2018, the Balconies officially announced the end of their work as a band.

In 2018 Neville began releasing music as a solo artist. She released her debut single "Lead the Way" in December 2018. In 2022 she released her first album as a solo artist, If You Get Lonely.

== Discography ==
With the Balconies

- The Balconies (2009)
- Fast Motions (2014)
- Rhonda (2016)
- Show You (2017)

As a solo artist

- If You Get Lonely (2022)
