= CIJK-FM =

Radio station in Annapolis Valley, Nova Scotia

Coordinates: 45°12′12″N 64°24′03″W

- New Minas, Nova Scotia; Canada
- Broadcast area: Annapolis Valley
- Frequency: 89.3 MHz
- Branding: Rewind 89.3

Programming
- Format: Classic Hits

Ownership
- Owner: Stingray Group

History
- First air date: June 12, 2008

Technical information
- Class: C1
- ERP: vertical polarization: 7.6 kW average 20 kW peak horizontal polarization: 11 kW average 30 kW peak
- HAAT: 251.1 metres (824 ft)

Links
- Webcast: Listen Live
- Website: rewind893.ca

CIJK-FM is a Canadian radio station broadcasting at 89.3 FM in New Minas, Nova Scotia, owned by Stingray Group. The station currently broadcasts a classic hits format branded as Rewind 89.3. The station is one of several radio stations approved in 2007 for the Atlantic Provinces.

According to the June 16 edition of the Northeast Radio Watch, CIJK signed on the air on June 12, 2008, at 8:09 a.m. and changed to an updated format in July 2012.

== History ==
On July 6, 2007, the CRTC approved an application by Newcap Inc. for a broadcasting licence to operate an English-language, FM commercial station in New Minas. The new station would operate on a frequency of 89.3 MHz with an average effective radiated power of 9,900 watts. The proposed station would offer a classic hits featuring hits of the 70s, 80s and 90s and targeted to adults between the ages of 24 and 54. All of the programming would be local. Approximately 98 hours of each broadcast week would consist of live-to-air programming while the remaining hours would be voice-tracked programming. In each broadcast week, the station would offer 16 hours of spoken word programming including 7 hours 30 minutes of news, of which 75% would be local content, and 8 hours 30 minutes of surveillance material such as local weather, traffic and the promotion of community events as well as other information of general interest. There is only one commercial licensee serving the Kentville radio market, namely Maritime Broadcasting System, which operates two FM stations, both of which are in Kentville. CKWM-FM offers a hot adult contemporary format, which appeals primarily to females aged 18–44 years. CKEN-FM offers a country format, which usually captures listeners between the ages of 25 and 54.

CIJK signed on the air June 12, 2008, at 8:09:30 a.m. as "89.3 K-Rock." The station offered a classic rock format that tested well with 18-54 year olds. There would be an emphasis on local information and weather, with news seven days a week delivered by a three-person news team. At the start, CIJK had a staff of 17 full-time and six part-time people. Ken Geddes was general manager, Gary Tredwell was program director and Dave Chalk was news director. Other on air staff included Julia Kirkey (news), Colin McInnis (mornings), Kate Peardon (mornings), Darrin Harvey (middays and weekend mornings), Melanie Sampson (afternoons), and Neil Spence (weekends). Studios and offices were located at 8794 Commercial Street (Suite 3) in New Minas.

A fair amount of personnel changes occurred at CIJK as station staff were moved to CFRQ-FM and CKUL-FM in Halifax. A few of them (Will MacKay, Curtis Bray) were formerly from Corus Radio Kitchener. Gary Tredwell left CIJK as program director to take up the same position at the Evanov Radio Group in Halifax.

Afternoon host Melanie Sampson left CIJK for the yet to launch CHHI-FM Miramichi, where she would be program director.

Darrin Harvey was named morning show host after several years working mid-days. Mel Sampson returned as program director.

On February 12, 2020, CIJK flipped from an active rock format as 89.3 K-Rock to classic Hits branded as Rewind 89.3.

Despite the different branding, the station is closely aligned with Stingray's Boom FM-branded stations, with similar logo designs and partial sharing of programs and personalities.
