= CHBM-FM =

Radio station in Toronto

Coordinates: 43.68828°N 79.39441°W

- Toronto, Ontario; Canada
- Broadcast area: Greater Toronto Area
- Frequency: 97.3 MHz (HD Radio)
- Branding: Boom 97.3

Programming
- Language: English
- Format: Classic hits

Ownership
- Owner: Stingray Group
- Sister stations: CFXJ-FM

History
- First air date: May 18, 1987
- Former call signs: CJEZ-FM (1987–2009)
- Call sign meaning: Boom (branding)

Technical information
- Licensing authority: CRTC
- Class: C1
- ERP: 26,360 watts
- HAAT: 449 metres (1,473 ft)

Links
- Webcast: Listen live (Canada only)
- Website: boom973.com

CHBM-FM (97.3 FM) is a radio station in Toronto, Ontario, Canada. The station currently broadcasts a classic hits format branded as Boom 97.3. CHBM's studios are located at Yonge Street and St. Clair Avenue in Toronto's Deer Park neighbourhood, while their transmitter is located atop the CN Tower. The station is owned by the Stingray Group.

The station's playlist contains songs from the 1970s, 1980s and 1990s, with a core focus on music released in the 1980s, while also playing select songs from the 1960s and early 2000s.

== History ==
The station was launched at 9:00 a.m. on May 18, 1987, by Redmond Broadcasting, with the call letters CJEZ-FM, and carried an easy listening format under the branding Easy 97. Staff for the new station included many long-time Toronto personalities, such as Jay Nelson, Russ Thompson, Bill Anderson and Carl Banas.

In the early 1990s, it changed its moniker to Lite 97, but soon after, it changed its format to classic hits as Z97.3. In February 1995, Redmond sold the station to Telemedia and on June 30, at 5:30 a.m., the station changed monikers to 97.3 EZ Rock. The slogan was The Heartbeat of Toronto, and aired an adult contemporary format. "EZ Rock" launched with the intent of having an audience of mainly women ages 25–44, and the Toronto station became the flagship when several other stations owned by Telemedia at the time broadcasting a similar format also gained the "EZ Rock" branding.

Former "EZ Rock" logo

In 2002, Standard Radio bought Telemedia and kept CJEZ under their ownership, while some of the other "EZ Rock" stations were sold to either Rogers Communications or Astral Media. In October 2007, Astral Media purchased much of Standard's assets, including CJEZ. In early 2009, the station became known as Today's New 97.3 EZ Rock, pivoting to a hot adult contemporary-leaning direction. During November 2009, certain personalities from the station left. Throughout much of that time until December, CJEZ played nonstop Christmas music, while at the same time, asking their listeners what radio station they want to hear going forward.

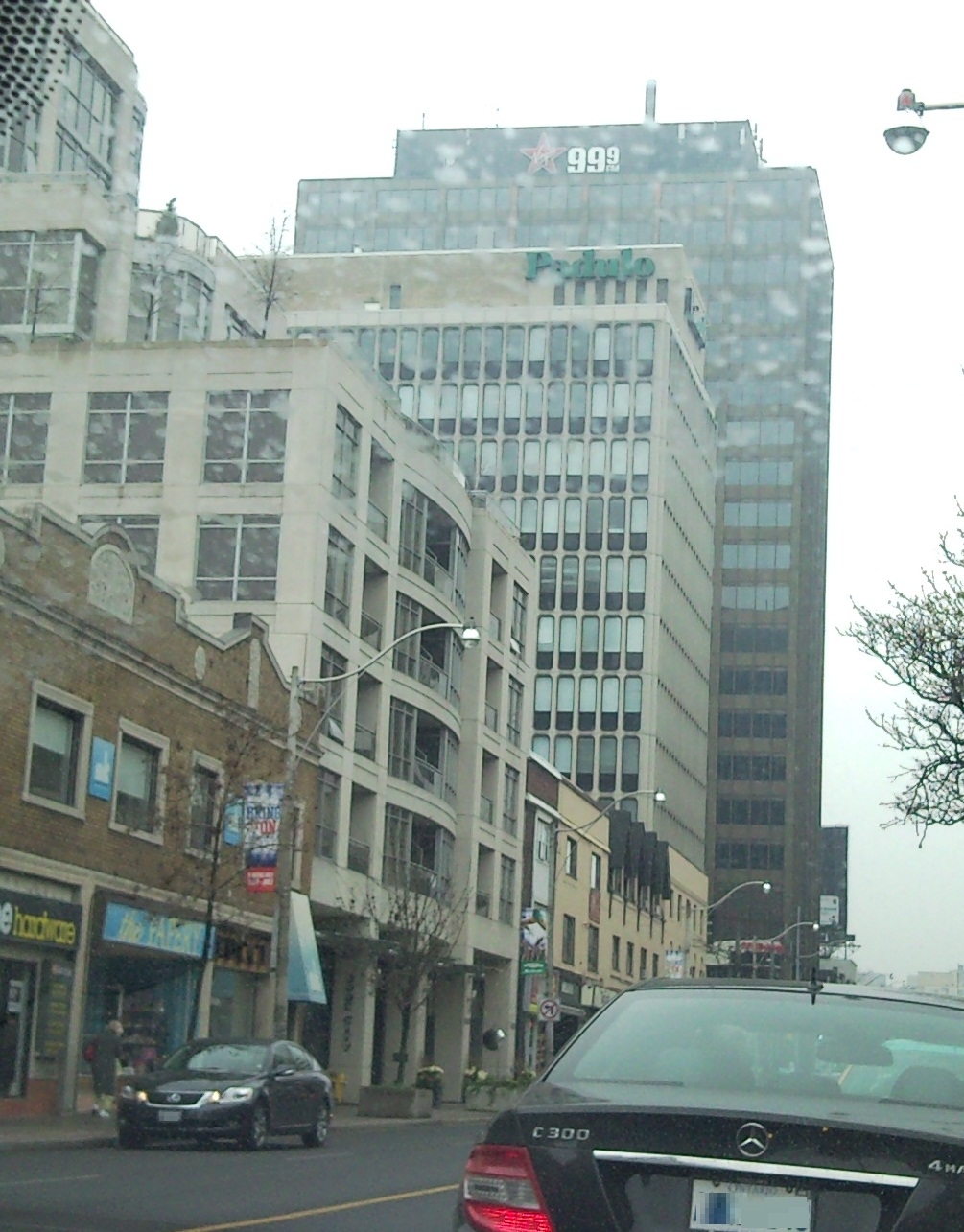
When Standard acquired CJEZ-FM from Telemedia in 2002, the studios of CJEZ-FM were relocated to the CFRB/CKFM-FM building.

=== Boom 97.3 (2009–present) ===
On December 24, 2009, during its standard Christmas music run during the holidays, the station's website was changed completely by hosting only a countdown clock and a posted message urging listeners to tune in at 9 a.m. on December 26. At 6 a.m. that day, after playing EZ Rock's final song (which was Christina Aguilera's version of "This Christmas"), the station began stunting with a recorded message on how to "view" the launch of the new station.

Finally, at 9 a.m., the station ended its 14-year run with AC, and flipped back to classic hits with the branding Boom 97.3, Toronto's Greatest Hits, adopting the "Boom" branding used by some of Astral's small-market French-language stations in Quebec. The first song played on "Boom" was "Don't Stop Believin'" by Journey. CJEZ's call letters were changed the following day to CHBM-FM. The station's airstaff remained intact for a time, but in May 2011, Humble Howard and Colleen Rusholme were let go by the station.

In March 2013, the Competition Bureau approved a proposal by Bell Media to acquire Astral Media, under the condition that it divest itself of several television services and radio stations. Following the closure of the merger, CHBM was placed in a blind trust pending its eventual sale. On August 26, Newcap Radio announced it would acquire CHBM, along with three other former Astral stations and Bell Media's CFXJ-FM, for $112 million. The deal was approved by the CRTC on March 19, and the sale closed on March 31.
