= CFSX =

Radio station in Stephenville, Newfoundland and Labrador

Coordinates: 48°31′34″N 58°29′24″W

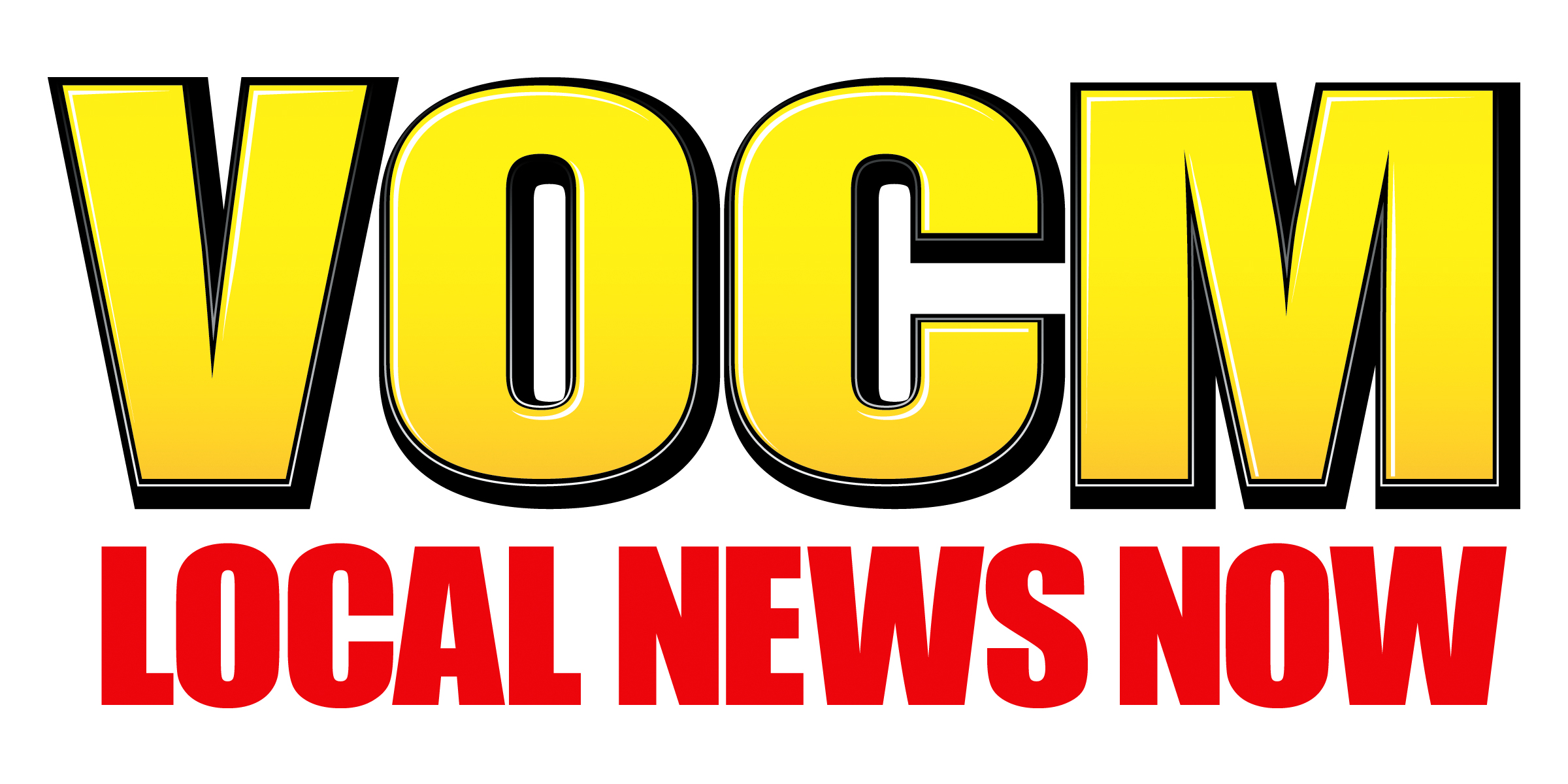
- Stephenville, Newfoundland and Labrador; Canada
- Frequency: 870 kHz
- Branding: 590 VOCM

Programming
- Format: Full service radio

Ownership
- Owner: Stingray Group

History
- First air date: November 13, 1964 (as a repeater of CFCB); March 25, 1970 (as a local station)
- Former frequencies: 910 kHz (1964–1985)
- Call sign meaning: Coming From Stephenville Xing (Crossing)

Technical information
- Class: C
- Power: 500 watts

Links
- Website: vocm.com

CFSX is an AM radio station in Stephenville, Newfoundland and Labrador, Canada, broadcasting at 870 kHz. Originally launched as a repeater on November 13, 1964, it opened its own studios in 1970. The station is owned by Stingray Group. It is an affiliate of VOCM.

In 1985, CFSX moved from 910 to its current frequency, 870.

In September 2016, CFSX was shut down by Newcap Radio without any notice. The station is now a full-time repeater of CFCB in Corner Brook, changing its identity to VOCM. Before then, CFSX operated as a daytime station, and served as a nighttime repeater to CFCB.

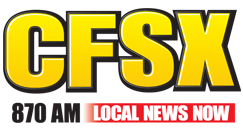
CFSX's final logo before the September 2016 rebranding as VOCM

CFSX also operated repeat transmitters in two locations:

- CFGN-FM 96.7 in Port aux Basques (Originally a full-time repeater of CFCB)
- CFCV-FM 97.7 in St. Andrew's

From 1973 to the 1990s, CFGN and CFCV operated independently of CFSX and CFCB in the daytime, and served as CFCB's nighttime and weekend repeater until it became a daytime repeater of CFSX.

On April 2, 2001, the sale of Humber Valley Broadcasting Co. Ltd. to Newcap Inc. was approved. This included CFSX, as well as:

- CFCB Corner Brook
- CFDL-FM Deer Lake
- CFNW Port aux Choix
- CFNN-FM St. Anthony
- CFGN Port-aux-Basques
- CFCV-FM St. Andrew's
- CFLN Goose Bay
- CFLW Wabush
- CFLC-FM Churchill Falls
