= CHSP-FM =

Radio station in St. Paul, Alberta

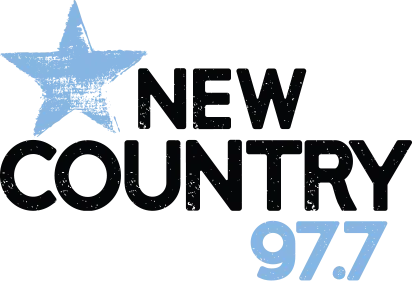
- St. Paul, Alberta; Canada
- Frequency: 97.7 MHz
- Branding: New Country 97.7

Programming
- Format: Country
- Affiliations: Westwood One

Ownership
- Owner: Stingray Group
- Sister stations: CJEG-FM, CJXK-FM

History
- First air date: 1975
- Former call signs: CIOK (1975–1982); CHLW (1982–2011)
- Former frequencies: 1310 kHz (AM) (1975–2011)
- Call sign meaning: CH Saint Paul (broadcast area) or CH SPur (former branding)

Technical information
- Class: B
- Power: 22,000 watts
- Transmitter coordinates: 53.991°N 111.279°W

Links
- Website: newcountrystpaul.ca

CHSP-FM (97.7 MHz) is a Canadian radio station that broadcasts a country format in St. Paul, Alberta. The station is branded on-air as New Country 97.7 as part of the New Country network branding in Alberta.

The station signed on in 1975 as CIOK. It was owned by the OK Radio Group until 1982, when it was sold to LW Broadcasting Ltd. and changed to CHLW. It was later owned by Newcap Broadcasting, until they were bought out by Stingray Group.

On April 21, 2009, Newcap radio received approval by the CRTC to convert CHLW to the FM dial at 97.7 MHz as CHSP-FM. After the flip to FM, the station's new call sign will become CHSP-FM.

During the holiday season of 2009 (starting December 1) CHLW flipped to an all-Christmas music format, rebranding as "The Lakeland's holiday music station". They reverted to the original country format following the conclusion of the holiday season.

On December 30, 2011, the station moved to 97.7 FM occurred; its format remained country as 97.7 The Spur.

In November 2016, CHSP rebranded under the Real Country brand, as with other Newcap-owned country stations in Alberta.

On March 4, 2024, CHSP rebranded as New Country 97.7 to match company’s other country music stations.

== Former logos ==
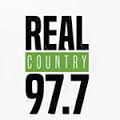
