= CILB-FM =

Radio station in Lac La Biche, Alberta

- Lac La Biche, Alberta; Canada
- Broadcast area: Lac La Biche County
- Frequency: 103.5 MHz
- Branding: Boom 103.5

Programming
- Language: English
- Format: Classic hits

Ownership
- Owner: Stingray Group

History
- First air date: December 7, 2007

Technical information
- Class: A
- ERP: 1,900 watts
- HAAT: 71.4 metres (234 ft)
- Transmitter coordinates: 54.7536°N 111.941°W

Links
- Webcast: Listen Live
- Website: boom1035.com

CILB-FM is a Canadian radio station broadcasting a classic hits format at 103.5 FM in Lac La Biche, Alberta. The station is branded as Boom 103.5 and was owned by Newcap Broadcasting until they were bought out by Stingray Group.

Newcap received approval from the Canadian Radio-television and Telecommunications Commission (CRTC) on January 18, 2006 and CILB was officially launched on December 7, 2007 at 10:35 AM as Big Dog 103.5, airing an adult hits format.

On July 7, 2017, at Midnight, after playing "Who Let The Dogs Out" by Baha Men (which was also the first song played as "Big Dog"), CILB flipped to classic hits as Boom 103.5. The first song played on "Boom" was "I'd Do Anything for Love (But I Won't Do That)" by Meatloaf.
