= CIHI-FM =

Radio station in Fredericton, New Brunswick

Coordinates: 46°07′07″N 66°46′28″W

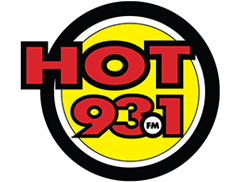
- Fredericton, New Brunswick; Canada
- Broadcast area: Greater Fredericton
- Frequency: 93.1 MHz
- Branding: Hot 93.1

Programming
- Format: Contemporary hit radio

Ownership
- Owner: Stingray Group
- Sister stations: CFRK-FM

History
- First air date: June 24, 2013

Technical information
- ERP: 42,000 watts 100,000 (maximum power)
- HAAT: 137.5 metres (451 ft)

Links
- Website: hot931.ca

CIHI-FM is a Canadian radio station broadcasting at 93.1 FM in Fredericton, New Brunswick owned by Stingray Group. The station uses its on-air brand name as Hot 93.1 with a contemporary hit radio format. The station launched on June 24, 2013.

== History ==
On May 11, 2012, Newcap received approval from the CRTC to operate a new English language FM radio station in Fredericton, New Brunswick at 93.1 FM.

A tourist information radio station, CIRC-FM, which is owned by Instant Information Services formerly operated at 93.3 FM which is an adjacent frequency to 93.1 FM. Following the approval of Newcap's application, CIRC, which had reportedly left the air in 2010, was directed to move to a new frequency.

On February 7, 2013, the CRTC approved Newcap's application to modify the technical parameters of CIHI by changing the class of its licence from B to C1, by decreasing the station's average effective radiated power (ERP) from 50,000 to 42,000 watts (and by increasing the maximum ERP from 50,000 to 100,000 watts), by decreasing the effective height of antenna above average terrain from 150.0 to 137.5 metres, by changing the radiation pattern of the antenna from non-directional to directional, and by relocating the antenna and transmitter from Hamtown Corner (the original site in the application), to Mount Hope.

CIHI first launched on June 24, 2013, as Up 93.1 with an adult hits format. The first song played on "Up!" was "Don't Stop" by Fleetwood Mac.

On February 12, 2021, the station flipped to classic hits branded as Rewind 93.1. While branded as Rewind, the station was closely aligned with Stingray's Boom FM branded stations, with similar logo designs and partial sharing of programs and personalities.

Near 4 pm on March 14, 2024, the station dropped the Rewind branding and started stunting with Taylor Swift songs. Listeners were asked to turn in on March 19 at 9:31 am with the message "Are you ready for it? Tuesday, 9:31 am. Be here. 93 1" being broadcast in between songs. On some car radios, in between songs, the station had the message "It's getting warm" appear on screen.

On March 19, 2024, at 9:31 am, after playing Magic Carpet Ride by Steppenwolf, the station flipped to CHR branded as Hot 93.1, Fredericton's #1 Hit Music Station. The first song on "Hot" was Yes And? by Ariana Grande. The change was prompted after CIBX-FM flipped to hot adult contemporary (and subsequently adult contemporary), leaving the city without a CHR station. In addition, CFXY-FM flipped to adult hits, competing directly with the station's format at the time.

On January 20, 2025, from 9 am until midnight, the station rebranded to Happy 93.1 to spread positivity on Blue Monday. The station retained the same music format.

== Former Logos ==
2013-2021

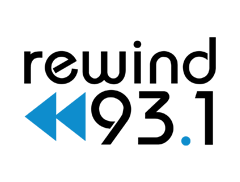
2021-2024

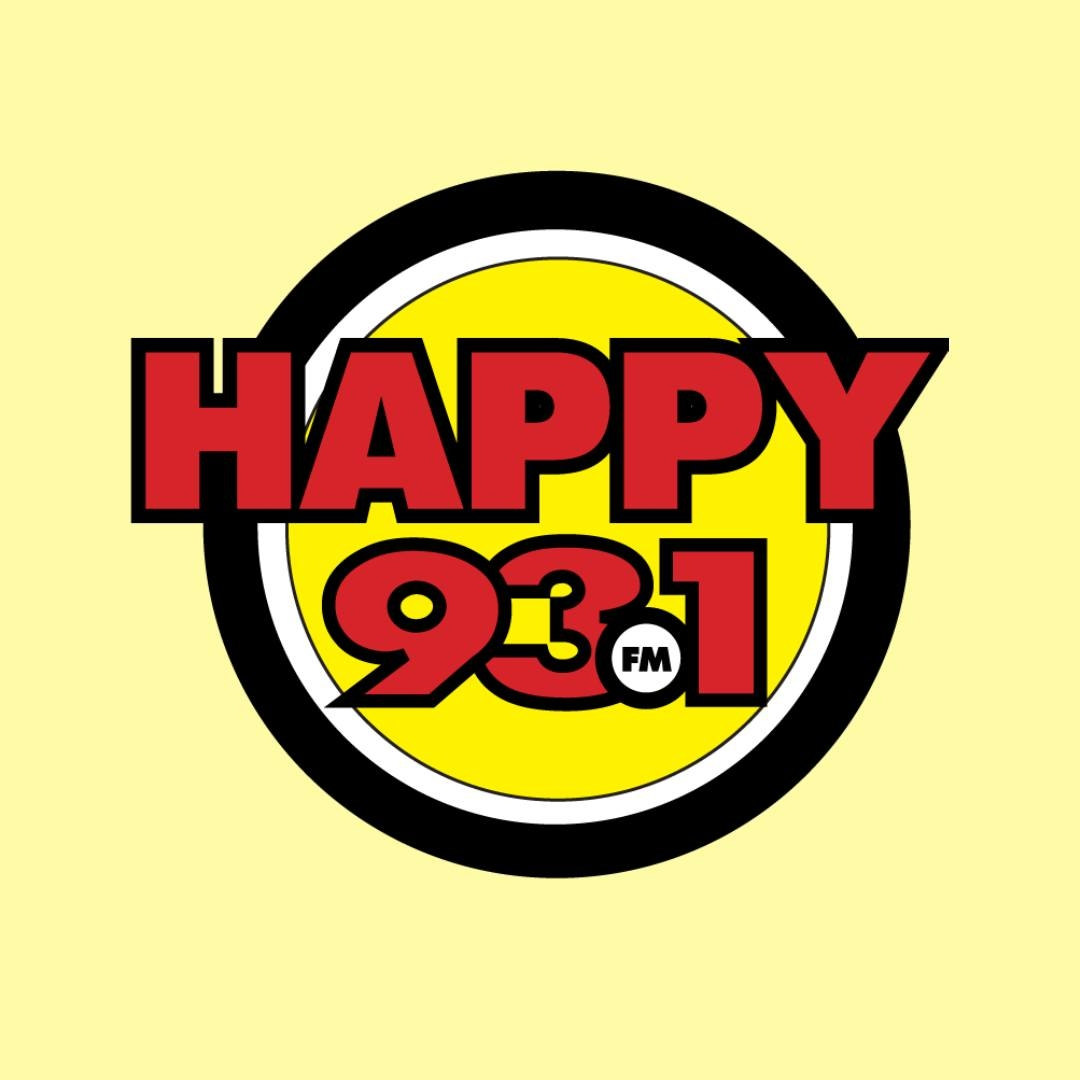
January 20, 2025
