= The Balconies =

Canadian alternative music trio

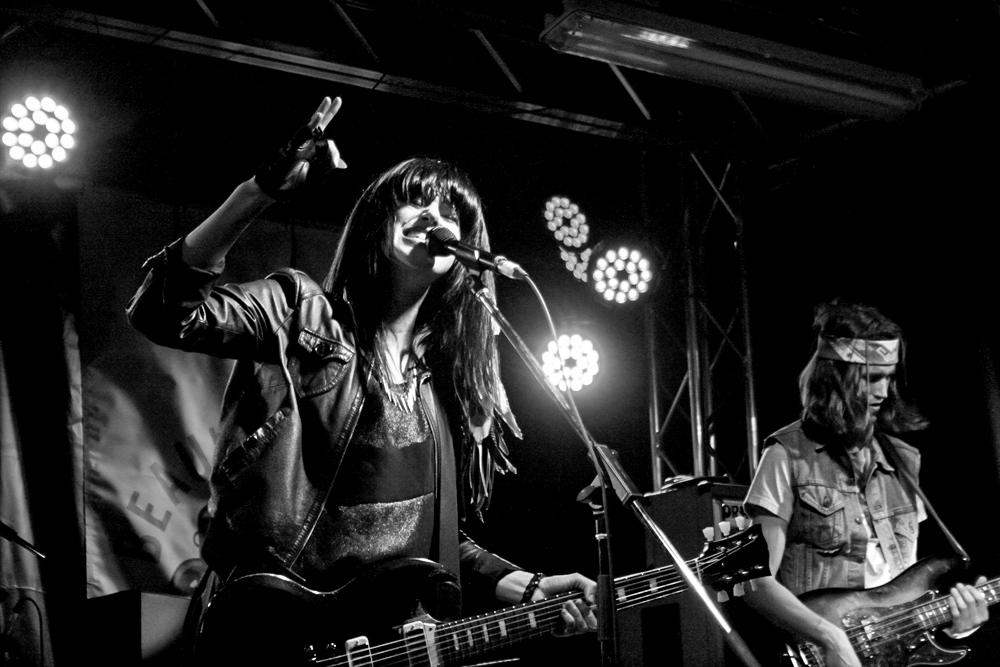
- The Balconies performing at Beau's Octoberfest in Vankleek Hill, Ontario on October 4, 2013

Background information
- Origin: Ottawa, Ontario, Canada
- Genres: Pop, rock, alternative rock
- Years active: 2007–2018
- Labels: Warner Music Canada, Coalition Music
- Past members: Liam Jaeger; Jacquie Neville; Stephen Neville

The Balconies were a Canadian alternative music trio formed in Ottawa, Ontario. The band originally consisted of Liam Jaeger, and siblings Jacquie and Steve Neville. The group performed with such bands as Cold War Kids, Mother Mother, Devo, Peter Bjorn and John, USS, Sloan, Stars, Wide Mouth Mason, Big Sugar, Tokyo Police Club, Bad Religion, and Sam Roberts Band.

== History ==
Jacquie and Stephen Neville had been playing music together since their early teens. Jacquie first met Liam Jaeger in the University of Ottawa in 2005 while they were both studying classical music. The trio formed The Balconies in late 2007. They released the self-titled debut album in 2009, which was recorded and produced by Carlin Nicholson of Zeus.

In late 2010, the band relocated to Toronto, and in the same year won Live 88.5's Big Money Shot, which awarded them $75,000, provided workshops with other music industry leaders, radio airplay, and numerous performance opportunities. Upon winning the development package, The Balconies were able to work with recording producer/engineer Jon Drew to record and release EP Kill Count in 2012. During this time, the band also played at several North American music festivals such as South by Southwest, Canadian Music Week, North by Northeast, Ottawa Bluesfest, and Culture Collide.

In 2013, The Balconies played a series of European music festivals, including MIDEM, Liverpool Sound City, and The Great Escape Festival. The band continued to tour Europe that year, opening for rock band Rival Sons. The band's second album Fast Motions, produced by Arnold Lanni, was released via Coalition Music/Warner Music Canada on January 28, 2014. The Balconies appeared in an episode of CBC's Cracked. The episode features the band getting caught in a shooting at a downtown nightclub. The episode aired October 7, 2013.

Shortly after Stephen Neville left the group in 2016, The Balconies released their third album, Rhonda. In late 2017, The Balconies announced that they were disbanding on their 10th anniversary. Along with a series of final concerts in Toronto and Ottawa, they also put out a previously unreleased studio album, Show You (recorded in 2012), and re-released their 2009 debut album. They played their final show at The 27 Club in Ottawa on February 3, 2018.

In 2018, Jacquie Neville announced that while the band would no longer tour, the members would be involved in music production working under the name The Balconies Collective.

== Members ==
- Jacquie Neville – guitar, vocals (2007–2018)
- Liam Jaeger – drums, guitar, vocals (2007–2018)
- Stephen Neville — bass (2007–2016)

== Discography ==
=== Albums ===
- The Balconies (2009)
- Fast Motions (2014)
- Rhonda (2016)
- Show You (2017)

=== Singles and EPs ===
- Kill Count (2012)
- "Kill Count (French Version)" (2012)
- "Do It in the Dark" (2012)
- "Money Money" (2016)
- "War" (2016)
- "Rhonda" (2016)

=== Music videos ===
- "Do It in the Dark" (2012)
- "The Slo" (2013)
- "Good and Ugly" (2014)
- "Boys and Girls (2014)
