= CKMQ-FM =

Radio station in Merritt, British Columbia

- Merritt, British Columbia; Canada
- Broadcast area: Nicola Valley
- Frequency: 101.1 MHz
- Branding: Q101

Programming
- Format: Adult contemporary
- Affiliations: Corus Radio, Merritt Centennials

Ownership
- Owner: Jim Pattison Group; (Merritt Broadcasting Ltd.)

History
- First air date: May 1, 1970
- Former call signs: CJNL (1970–2009)
- Former frequencies: 1230 kHz (1970–2009)

Technical information
- Class: B
- ERP: 200 watts horizontal polarization only
- HAAT: 601.4 meters (1,973 ft)
- Transmitter coordinates: 50°06′29″N 120°46′06″W

Links
- Webcast: Listen Live
- Website: q101.ca

CKMQ-FM is a radio station broadcasting at 101.1 FM in Merritt, British Columbia, Canada. The station broadcasts an adult contemporary format branded as Q101.

The station was originally launched in 1970 on AM 1230 as CJNL. Merritt Broadcasting, that station's owner, received CRTC approval to convert to the FM band in 2009, and the station was relaunched on FM on August 31 that year. Simultaneously, the company's former sister division, NL Broadcasting, received approval to launch a separate rebroadcaster of CHNL, the company's talk station in Kamloops, on CJNL's old AM frequency.

On December 22, 2020, the CRTC approved the completed acquisition of Merritt Broadcasting Ltd. to Jim Pattison Group
