= CFXW-FM =

Radio station in Whitecourt, Alberta, Canada

- Whitecourt, Alberta; Canada
- Broadcast area: Whitecourt, Fox Creek
- Frequency: 96.7 MHz
- Branding: Boom 96.7

Programming
- Format: Classic hits

Ownership
- Owner: Stingray Group

History
- First air date: 1974
- Former call signs: CFYR (1974–1996); CFYR-FM (1996–2005)
- Call sign meaning: Fox Whitecourt (former branding and broadcast area)

Technical information
- Class: C1
- ERP: 9,000 watts
- HAAT: 382.5 metres (1,255 ft)
- Transmitter coordinates: 54.142°N 115.684°W

Links
- Website: boom967.com

CFXW-FM (96.7 MHz, Boom 96.7) is a radio station in Whitecourt, Alberta, Canada, and is transmitted on 96.7 FM in Whitecourt and on 98.1 FM in Fox Creek. Owned by Stingray Group, it broadcasts a classic hits format.

== History ==
The station was originally on the AM dial as CFYR, until it received CRTC approval to move to 96.7 FM in 1996, then launched as CFYR-FM.

In 2005, CFYR received CRTC approval to operate a transmitter at Whitecourt on the frequency 96.7 FM to replace CFYR-FM and launch as a stand-alone station with the callsign CFXW-FM.

On October 7, 2013, Newcap submitted an application to add a new FM transmitter at Fox Creek (CFXW-FM-1) to rebroadcast CFXW-FM at 98.1 MHz with 610 watts. This rebroadcaster was approved on January 23, 2014. The 98.1 transmitter is still used as a repeater for CFXW today.

On July 7, 2017, the station flipped from active rock (as 96.7 The Rig) to classic hits, branded as Boom 96.7.
