= CJKC-FM =

Radio station in Kamloops, British Columbia

Coordinates: 50°40′15″N 120°23′55″W

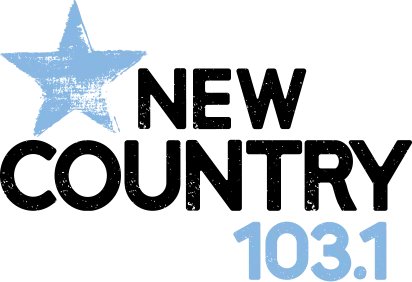
- Kamloops, British Columbia; Canada
- Frequency: 103.1 MHz
- Branding: New Country 103.1

Programming
- Format: Country
- Affiliations: Westwood One

Ownership
- Owner: Stingray Group
- Sister stations: CHNL; CKRV-FM

History
- First air date: August 11, 2006
- Former names: Country 103 (2006–2017)
- Call sign meaning: Kamloops Country

Technical information
- Licensing authority: CRTC
- Class: B1
- ERP: 5 kW horizontal polarization only
- HAAT: 127 metres (417 ft)

Links
- Webcast: Listen Live
- Website: newcountry1031.ca

CJKC-FM is a radio station, broadcasting at 103.1 FM in Kamloops, British Columbia, Canada. The station broadcasts a country format branded as New Country 103.1.

The station received approval in 2005 and was launched on August 11, 2006, by local broadcaster NL Broadcasting, the owner of CHNL and CKRV as Country 103. It was acquired by Newcap Radio in 2017, changing its branding to New Country 103.1.

== Past station logos ==
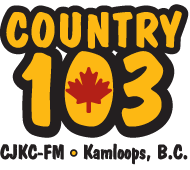
Country 103 Logo 2006–2017.

New Country 103.1 Logo 2017–2024.
