= CFNB-FM =

Radio station in British Columbia, Canada

Coordinates: 50°32′44″N 122°28′20″W

- D'arcy, British Columbia; Canada
- Frequency: 97.5 MHz (FM)
- Branding: CFNB 97.5

Programming
- Format: Community radio

Ownership
- Owner: Anderson Lake Recreational and Cultural Society

History
- First air date: August 21, 2000

Technical information
- ERP: 5 watts
- HAAT: 5 metres

Links
- Website: nquatqua.ca

CFNB-FM is a Canadian radio station that broadcasts a community radio format at 97.5 FM in D'arcy, British Columbia. The station is owned and operated by the Anderson Lake Recreational and Cultural Society.

The CFNB call sign was used at a former radio station in Fredericton, New Brunswick, until 1996 when the station moved to the FM band known today as CIBX-FM.
