= CKBA-FM =

Radio station in Athabasca, Alberta

Coordinates: 54°42′14″N 113°17′23″W

- Athabasca, Alberta; Canada
- Broadcast area: Athabasca
- Frequency: 94.1 MHz
- Branding: Boom 94.1

Programming
- Format: Classic hits

Ownership
- Owner: Stingray Group; (3937844 Canada Inc.)

History
- First air date: August 1, 1989
- Former frequencies: 850 kHz

Technical information
- Class: B1
- ERP: 9,000 watts
- HAAT: 54 metres (177 ft)

Links
- Website: boom941.com

CKBA-FM is a Canadian radio station broadcasting at 94.1 FM in Athabasca, Alberta with a classic hits format branded as Boom 94.1. The station is owned by Stingray Group.

== History ==
CKBA was granted a broadcast license for 850 kHz in 1988. CKBA began broadcasting on August 1, 1989. At that time, CKBA's license was to provide 24 hours of local programming per week, including 2 hours and 18 minutes of local news. The rest of the programming was re-broadcast from CFOK in Westlock. At the point the station was known only by its call letters, CKBA.

In 2002, CKBA was acquired by Newcap Broadcasting, and became part of Newcap's "Cat Country" radio network. The station's name was changed to 850 CKBA Cat Country. On September 29, 2006, CKBA changed formats from country to classic hits. Along with the format change came a new name, 850 The Fox.

=== Switch to FM ===
On December 23, 2008, CKBA received CRTC approval to convert to 94.1 MHz. The FM transmitter began broadcasting on July 14, 2009. On August 17, 2009, CKBA made the flip to its current frequency. The station was rebranded as 94.1 The River retaining the classic hits format.

Athabasca's old 850 AM transmitter was shut down on September 17, 2009.

On July 7, 2017, the station changed its branding to Boom 94.1.
