= CJXK-FM =

Radio station in Cold Lake, Alberta

Coordinates: 54°17′26″N 110°28′57″W

- Cold Lake, Alberta; Canada
- Frequency: 95.3 MHz
- Branding: Boom 95.3

Programming
- Format: Classic hits

Ownership
- Owner: Stingray Group
- Sister stations: CHSP-FM, CJEG-FM

History
- First air date: December 1, 1979

Technical information
- Class: C1
- ERP: vertical polarization: 42,900 watts horizontal polarization: 100,000 watts
- HAAT: 155 meters (509 ft)

Links
- Website: boom953.ca

CJXK-FM is a Canadian radio station, broadcasting at 95.3 FM in Cold Lake, Alberta owned by Stingray Group. The station broadcasts a classic hits format branded as Boom 95.3.

The station originally began broadcasting on December 1, 1979 on the frequency 1340 kHz, until it received approval by the CRTC in 2003 to move to the FM dial, which officially happened on September 3, 2004. At the same time as the move to FM, the station flipped to classic rock as 95.3 K-Rock.

On July 7, 2017, CJXK changed its format to classic hits as Boom 95.3.
