= CJEG-FM =

Radio station in Bonnyville, Alberta

Coordinates: 54°17′26″N 110°28′57″W

- Bonnyville, Alberta; Canada
- Frequency: 101.3 MHz
- Branding: Hot 101.3

Programming
- Format: Contemporary hit radio

Ownership
- Owner: Stingray Group
- Sister stations: CHSP-FM; CJXK-FM

History
- First air date: May 19, 2006

Technical information
- Licensing authority: CRTC
- Class: B
- ERP: 27 kWs
- HAAT: 114.7 metres (376 ft)

Links
- Website: hot1013fm.com

CJEG-FM is a Canadian radio station that broadcasts a contemporary hit radio format at 101.3 FM in Bonnyville, Alberta, Canada, branded as Hot 101.3. The station is owned by Stingray Group.

== History ==
The station was licensed by the CRTC on March 10, 2006. Testing began on May 5 and the station officially began broadcasting two weeks later (May 19) as Kool 101.3.

On October 7, 2019, CJEG was rebranded as Hot 101.3 but kept the same format.
