= CIBQ-FM =

Radio station in Brooks, Alberta

Coordinates: 50°30′24″N 111°53′14″W

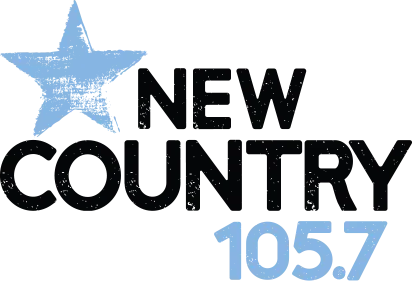
- Brooks, Alberta; Canada
- Frequency: 105.7 MHz
- Branding: New Country 105.7

Programming
- Format: Country
- Affiliations: Westwood One

Ownership
- Owner: Stingray Group
- Sister stations: CIXF-FM

History
- First air date: April 15, 1973
- Former call signs: CKBR

Technical information
- Class: B1
- ERP: 6,600 watts average 14,000 watts peak
- HAAT: 45.6 metres (150 ft)

Links
- Webcast: Listen Live
- Website: newcountrybrooks.ca

CIBQ-FM (105.7 MHz, New Country 105.7) is a radio station in Brooks, Alberta. Owned by Stingray Group, it broadcasts a country format.

== History ==
The station began broadcasting on April 15, 1973 as CKBR, until it changed to its current callsign in 1981. In 1985, CIBQ received approval to change frequencies from 1340 AM to 770 AM but was never implemented. CIBQ lost out to Calgary's CHQR for a move to 770 kHz.

On April 23, 2010, CIBQ received CRTC approval to move to FM on the frequency 105.7 MHz.

In February 2011, CIBQ officially moved to its new frequency, and rebranded from Q13 to Q105.7.

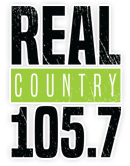
Previous logo

On November 7, 2016, CIBQ rebranded as Real Country 105.7 as part of the province-wide rebrand of all Newcap country radio stations on FM in Alberta under the "Real Country" network branding.

On March 5, 2024, CIBQ rebranded as New Country 105.7 as part of a company-wide effort to match all the country radio stations under the "New Country" network branding.
