= CKCH-FM =

Coordinates: 46°05′55″N 60°18′41″W

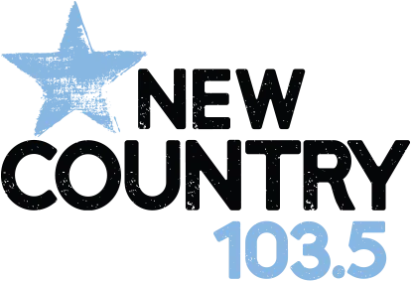
- Sydney, Nova Scotia; Canada
- Broadcast area: Cape Breton Island
- Frequency: 103.5 MHz
- Branding: New Country 103.5

Programming
- Format: Country

Ownership
- Owner: Stingray Group
- Sister stations: CHRK-FM

History
- First air date: June 2008

Technical information
- Class: B
- ERP: 26,500 watts
- HAAT: 169 metres (554 ft)

Links
- Webcast: Listen Live
- Website: newcountry1035.ca

CKCH-FM is a radio station broadcasting at 103.5 FM in Sydney, Nova Scotia, Canada. The station was one of several new radio stations approved in 2007 for the Atlantic Provinces and is also one of two new radio stations for the Cape Breton Regional Municipality along with sister station CHRK-FM. The station airs a country format branded on-air as New Country 103.5. The station is owned by Stingray Group which also owns sister station CHRK as well as numerous other radio stations across Canada.

The station license was originally awarded to a Cape Breton group that included local investor / businessman Barry Martin, and broadcasters, Jay Bedford and Alex Morrison. In late 2012, the CRTC approved the application by Newcap Radio to purchase the remaining 70.1% of the shares from Barry Martin. In November 2018, Stingray Digital acquired Newcap Radio.

== History ==
CKCH was formerly a call sign for an AM station in Hull, Quebec from 1933 to 1994 and also its sister station CKCH-FM from 1970 through 1978.

The station began a required three week Industry Canada test period on May 15, 2008 by playing television theme songs until its official launch on June 17 of that year.

The station opened with a variety based country format but switched to a top 40 country approach in 2010. CKCH airs ten newscasts every weekday with the focus on local and regional news items. Veteran broadcaster Don Sharpe joined the on air staff in July 2016 as the host of the afternoon drive show. Sharpe can now be heard as the morning show host Monday-Friday and the weekend feature: The All Canadian Countdown!

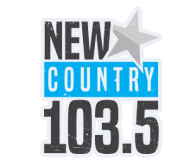
Former New Country 103.5 logo used from, 2017-2024

In February 2017, CKCH-FM dropped the moniker The Eagle and adopted the name New Country 103.5. This was done in conjunction with the re-branding of three other Newcap country stations in Moncton, Fredericton and Kamloops.
