= CHNL =

Radio station in Kamloops

- Kamloops, British Columbia; Canada
- Frequency: 610 kHz (AM)
- Branding: Radio NL

Programming
- Format: Classic hits
- Affiliations: Kamloops Blazers

Ownership
- Owner: Stingray Group
- Sister stations: CJKC-FM; CKRV-FM

History
- First air date: May 1, 1970

Technical information
- Licensing authority: CRTC
- Class: B
- Power: 25,000 watts day; 5,000 watts night
- Transmitter coordinates: 50.6472°N 120.272°W
- Repeaters: CINL 1340 Ashcroft; CHNL-1 1400 Clearwater

Links
- Webcast: Listen Live
- Website: radionl.com

CHNL (610 AM, "Radio NL") is a radio station in Kamloops, British Columbia, Canada. Owned by Stingray Radio, it broadcasts a full-service classic hits format.

610 AM is a regional broadcast frequency. There are three stations in Canada on this frequency.

== History ==
CHNL has been a mix of news/talk station since September 2006 and a classic hits station since April 2014. Prior to it, the station aired an adult contemporary format and branded as a "lite hits" station in the 1980s.

On April 25, 2009, CHNL received CRTC approval to add a transmitter in Merritt at 1230 kHz. The transmitter took over the AM frequency of Merritt's local radio station CJNL, which converted to 101.1 MHz and now broadcasts with the call sign CKMQ-FM. 1230 kHz went off-air for good on September 15, 2020, when the land owner did not renew the lease on the transmitter property.

In 2017, station owner NL Broadcasting was acquired by Halifax-based Newcap Radio. Newcap was in turn acquired by Stingray Group in 2018.

On September 24, 2024, Stingray announced cuts to CHNL, laying off several of its news reporters, and transitioning the station from a pure news/talk format to a classic hits format, while maintaining some of its talk and sports programming.

== Rebroadcasters ==
Rebroadcasters of CHNL
City of licence	Identifier	Frequency	Power	Class	RECNet
Ashcroft	CINL	1340 AM	1,000 watts	C	Query
Clearwater	CHNL-1	1400 AM	1,000 watts	C	Query

== Former logo ==
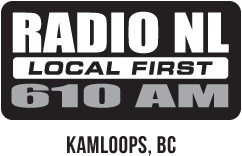
