= CFCB =

Radio station in Corner Brook, Newfoundland

- Corner Brook, Newfoundland and Labrador; Canada
- Broadcast area: Western Newfoundland
- Frequency: 570 kHz
- Branding: 590 VOCM

Programming
- Format: Full-service radio

Ownership
- Owner: Stingray Group
- Sister stations: CKXX-FM

History
- First air date: October 3, 1960
- Call sign meaning: Coming From Corner Brook

Technical information
- Class: C
- Power: 10,000 watts (day); 1,000 watts (night)
- Transmitter coordinates: 48°56′13.1″N 57°59′25.1″W

Links
- Website: vocm.com

CFCB (570 kHz) is an AM radio station in Corner Brook, Newfoundland and Labrador, Canada. It broadcasts at a power of 10,000 watts by day and 1,000 watts at night. Owned by Stingray Group, CFCB first went on the air on October 3, 1960. The station was founded by Dr. Noel Murphy.

On March 26, 2012, CFCB rebranded, which included a new slogan, logo and programming. The "Local News Now" slogan was adopted from VOCM in St. John's, which had rebranded just weeks before. The new CFCB logo also features the VOCM color scheme, which includes yellow and red.

As of March 9, 2022, CFCB no longer originates any local programming from Corner Brook following the closure of its studios and termination of on-air personnel by Stingray. All content of this station is now simulcast from VOCM in St. John's, with the exception of local commercials. CFCB's sister station, CKXX-FM, also shared the same fate as it shared studio facilities and personalities.

== Rebroadcasters ==
CFCB also operates rebroadcasters in the following locations:

- CFNW-FM 96.7 Port au Choix (opened January 29, 1972, originally on 790 AM).
- CFSX 870 AM Stephenville (opened November 13, 1964)
- CFGN-FM 96.7 Port aux Basques (opened August 6, 1971, originally on 1230 AM)
- CFCV-FM 97.7 St. Andrew's (opened June 6, 1974)
- CFDL-FM 97.9 Deer Lake (opened December 6, 1974)
- CFNN-FM 97.9 St. Anthony (opened June 27, 1974)

The CFNW in Gros Morne National Park was knocked off the air due to an ice and wind storm in late 2011 which damaged the tower. When the transmitter site was constructed in 1971, the area was not a national park. On October 3, 2012, Newcap Broadcasting applied to convert CFNW to the FM band. On January 25, 2013, the CRTC approved Newcap's application to convert CFNW to the FM band. CFNW now operates at 96.7 MHz.

In September 2013, the CFCB transmission tower in Corner Brook was taken down. Construction on a new tower was completed with a three-legged guyed mast radiator. The previous mast radiator over 50 years old prior to being taken down. The old mast radiator, was a second hand tower that was erected and begun broadcasting at 1,000 watts in 1961. However, the CRTC approved the daytime transmitting power to 10,000 watts from 1,000 watts which could be achieved with the new and more modern mast radiator located on the same plot of land that the previous one had been erected.

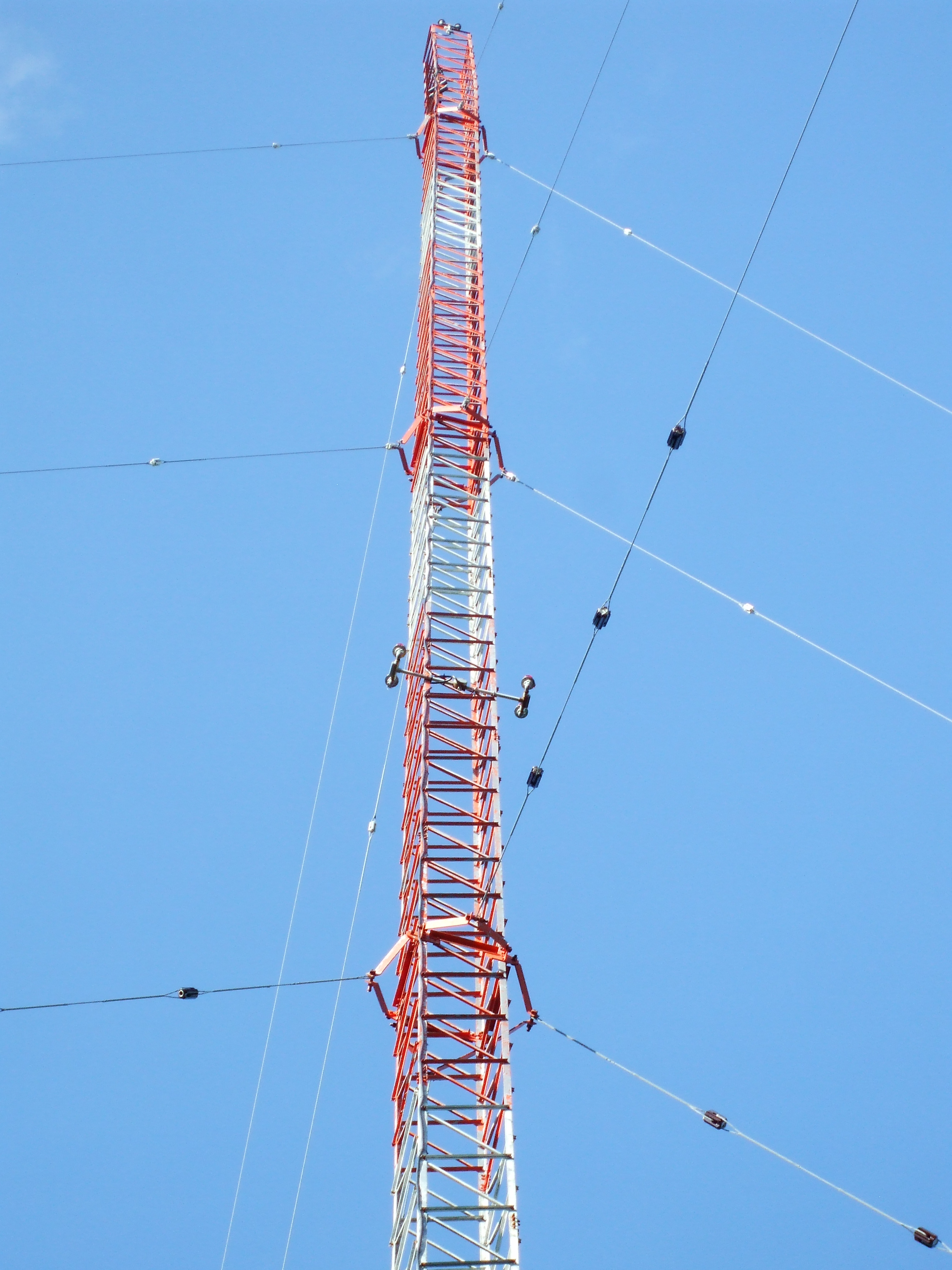
Old mast radiator tower for CFCB

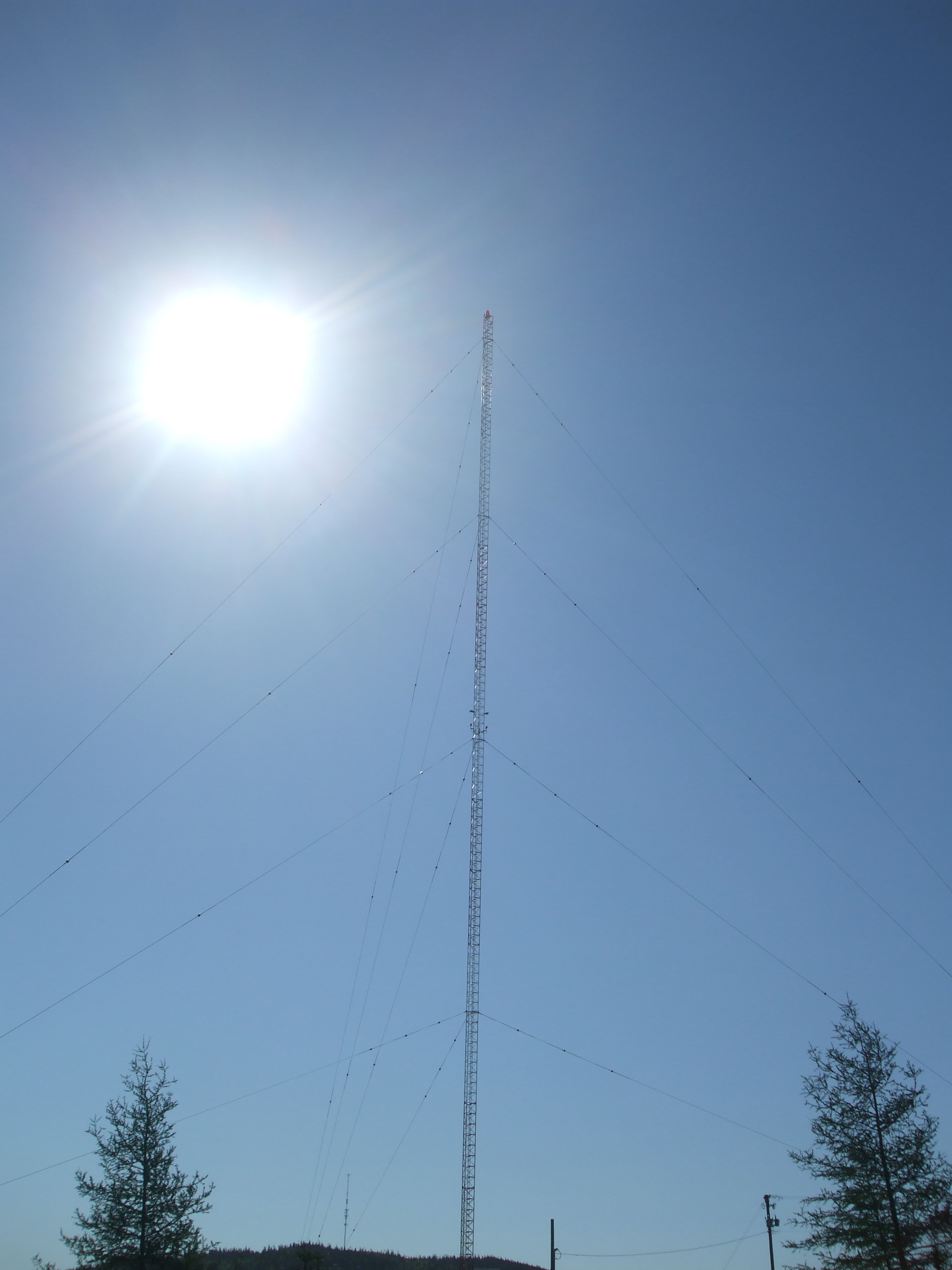
New CFCB Mast Radiator tower

On April 2, 2001, the sale of Humber Valley Broadcasting Co. Ltd. to Newcap Inc. was approved. This included a number of radio stations such as:

- CFCB Corner Brook
- CFDL-FM Deer Lake
- CFNW Port-aux-Choix
- CFNN-FM St. Anthony
- CFSX Stephenville
- CFGN Port-aux-Basques
- CFCV-FM St. Andrew's
- CFLN Goose Bay
- CFLW Wabush
- CFLC-FM Churchill Falls

In September 2016, CFSX and its repeaters were shut down by Newcap Radio without any notice. The station appears to now be serving as a full-time repeater of CFCB, changing its identity to VOCM. Before then, CFSX operated as a daytime station, and served as a nighttime repeater to CFCB.
