= CKKY-FM =

Radio station in Wainwright, Alberta

- Wainwright, Alberta; Canada
- Frequency: 101.9 MHz
- Branding: Boom 101.9

Programming
- Format: Classic hits

Ownership
- Owner: Stingray Group
- Sister stations: CKWY-FM

History
- First air date: 1984
- Former call signs: CILW (1984-1990s); CKKY (1990s-2013)
- Former frequencies: 1230 kHz (1984–1991); 830 kHz (1991–2013)
- Call sign meaning: From former "Key" branding

Technical information
- Class: C1
- ERP: 50,000 watts
- HAAT: 169.5 metres (556 ft)
- Transmitter coordinates: 52.832°N 110.858°W

Links
- Website: 1019boom.com

CKKY-FM is a Canadian radio station that broadcasts at 101.9 FM in Wainwright, Alberta. The station is branded as Boom 101.9 with a classic hits format and is owned by Stingray Group.

== History ==
The station began broadcasting in 1984 as 1230 CILW. In 1991, the station moved from 1230 to 830, upon approval by the CRTC. CILW changed its callsign to CKKY sometime in the 1990s, adopting the moniker Key 83.

On December 5, 2008, the application by 3937844 Canada Inc., a subsidiary of Newcap, for a broadcasting licence to operate a new FM radio station in Wainwright, to replace its AM station CKKY, was denied by the CRTC. On February 11, 2010, the station again applied to move to FM; the application was withdrawn on February 26, 2010.

On January 13, 2011, the station applied to change frequencies to 1080 kHz. This application received CRTC approval on March 3, 2011. The move to 1080 kHz was never implemented. Both frequencies would have carried nighttime wattage and antenna restrictions, in order to protect Class-A clear-channel stations WCCO AM 830 in Minneapolis and KRLD in Dallas.

On November 7, 2012, Newcap applied to convert CKKY to FM. The new station will operate on the frequency of 101.9 MHz, with an effective radiated power (ERP) of 50,000 watts (non-directional antenna with an effective height above average terrain (EHAAT) of 169.5 metres). The FM signal will replace the AM 830 transmitter, which will be deleted after the new FM station is in operation and following a three-month simulcast period. The conversion was approved by the CRTC on April 23, 2013.

On October 23, 2013, CKKY moved to 101.9 MHz on the FM band as CKKY-FM, with an active rock format as K-Rock 101.9, replacing the country format that CKKY previously used on AM. Program director Kurt Price cited the saturated country radio market as the reason behind the format change. The former 830 AM transmitter was shut down in conjunction with the flip, instead of simulcasting the FM for the three months allowed by the CRTC. The shutdown of the 830kHz AM transmitter was necessary to allow sister station CFCW (AM) to execute its previously approved move to 840kHz.

On July 7, 2017, CKKY flipped to adult hits as Boom 101.9.
