= CKWY-FM =

Radio station in Wainwright, Alberta

- Wainwright, Alberta; Canada
- Frequency: 93.7 MHz
- Branding: Hot 93.7

Programming
- Format: Contemporary hit radio

Ownership
- Owner: Stingray Group
- Sister stations: CKKY-FM

History
- First air date: January 31, 2005
- Call sign meaning: From former "Wayne FM" branding

Technical information
- Class: C1
- ERP: Vertical: 50 kWs average & peak Horizontal: 50 kWs average & peak
- HAAT: 169.5 metres (556 ft)
- Transmitter coordinates: 52.832°N 110.858°W

Links
- Website: hot937.ca

CKWY-FM is a Canadian radio station that broadcasts a contemporary hit radio format at 93.7 FM in Wainwright, Alberta. The station is branded as Hot 93.7 and is owned by Stingray Group.

On January 30, 2004, Newcap was given approval from the CRTC to operate a new English-language FM radio station in Wainwright. The station began broadcasting on January 31, 2005 at 7 AM with a classic hits format as 93.7 Wayne FM.

On November 7, 2012, Newcap applied to decrease CKWY's signal from 100,000 watts to 50,000 watts, with its antenna height above average terrain (EHAAT) increased from 167.0 metres to 169.5 metres. This application was approved on April 23, 2013.

On October 7, 2019, CKWY rebranded to Hot 93.7 and changed its format to CHR/Top 40.
