= CKHJ =

Radio station in Fredericton

Coordinates: 45°59′52″N 66°41′37″W

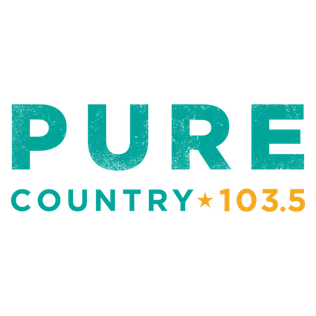
- Fredericton, New Brunswick; Canada
- Broadcast area: Greater Fredericton
- Frequency: 1260 kHz
- Branding: Pure Country 103.5

Programming
- Format: Country
- Affiliations: Premiere Networks

Ownership
- Owner: Bell Media; (Bell Media Radio Atlantic Inc.)
- Sister stations: CFXY-FM, CIBX-FM

History
- First air date: August 19, 1977
- Former call signs: CIHI (1977–2000)
- Former frequencies: 105.3 MHz (FM) (1977–2000)
- Call sign meaning: referencing KHJ in Los Angeles

Technical information
- Class: B
- Power: 10,000 watts day; 32 watts night
- Repeaters: 95.1 CKHJ-1-FM (New Maryland); 103.5 CKHJ-2-FM (Oromocto)

Links
- Webcast: Listen Live
- Website: purecountry.ca/fredericton

CKHJ (1260 AM) is a radio station in Fredericton, New Brunswick, Canada. The station broadcasts a country format under the Pure Country branding. The station is owned by Bell Media which also owns sister stations CFXY-FM and CIBX-FM. There are two rebroadcasters of CKHJ on FM due to the AM station's weak signal to the south and east of the city: CKHJ-1-FM on 95.1 in New Maryland, and CKHJ-2-FM in 103.5 in Oromocto. All three transmitters can be heard over most of Fredericton, effectively creating a simulcast. CKHJ uses on the air-branding of Pure Country 103.5 (a name adopted on May 28, 2019, as part of a country-wide format reorganization by Bell that also involved CKTY-FM and 11 other stations), referencing the frequency of CKHJ-2-FM, which is a rimshot signal.

Based on the current format, CKHJ competes with Stingray-owned CFRK-FM.

== History ==
Logo used until 2019

The station at 1260 AM first signed on August 19, 1977 as CIHI. In June 2000, the station swapped frequencies with what was then CKHJ-FM, with CIHI assuming CKHJ's 105.3 frequency and CKHJ moving to 1260 AM. CIHI-FM would subsequently become CFXY-FM.

CKHJ, along with CIHI, was owned by Radio One Ltd. from its creation until 1999, when they were sold to Telemedia Communications. Telemedia then sold the stations to Astral Media in 2002. Current owners Bell Media acquired the stations from Astral Media in 2013.

The station's transmitter is on Royal Road, northwest of Fredericton.

On November 27, 2008, CKHJ applied to increase the signal of CKHJ-2-FM Oromocto. The station received approval on January 26, 2009.

On August 20, 2020, Bell Media submitted an application to reduce CKHJ's nighttime AM signal from 10,000 watts to 32 watts, while the daytime power would remain at 10,000 watts. CKHJ will remain at 1260 kHz. This application was approved on October 29, 2020.

== Rebroadcasters ==
Rebroadcasters of CKHJ
City of licence	Identifier	Frequency	Power	Class
New Maryland	CKHJ-1-FM	95.1 FM	50 watts	LP
Oromocto	CKHJ-2-FM	103.5 FM	250 watts	A1
