= CIXF-FM =

Radio station in Brooks, Alberta

Coordinates: 50°30′24″N 111°53′14″W

- Brooks, Alberta; Canada
- Broadcast area: Brooks
- Frequency: 101.1 MHz
- Branding: Boom 101.1

Programming
- Format: Classic hits

Ownership
- Owner: Stingray Group
- Sister stations: CIBQ-FM

History
- First air date: October 11, 2005

Technical information
- Class: B1
- ERP: 4,100 watts average 8,600 watts peak
- HAAT: 45.6 metres (150 ft)

Links
- Webcast: Listen live
- Website: boom1011.com

CIXF-FM is a Canadian radio station broadcasting at 101.1 FM in Brooks, Alberta. The station broadcasts a classic hits format branded as Boom 101.1 and is owned by Stingray Group.

== History ==
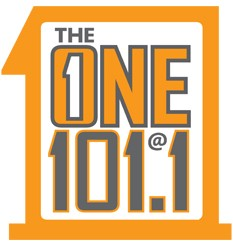
Previous logo as "The One @ 101.1"

The station received CRTC approval on December 19, 2003 and was launched on October 11, 2005 as 101.1 The Fox originally with a classic hits format.

On January 18, 2011, the station flipped to a hot adult contemporary format as The One @ 101.1.

In July 2017, the station changed to adult hits as Boom 101.1.
