= CKRV-FM =

Radio station in Kamloops

- Kamloops, British Columbia; Canada
- Frequency: 97.5 MHz
- Branding: K 97.5

Programming
- Format: Classic rock

Ownership
- Owner: Stingray Radio
- Sister stations: CHNL; CJKC-FM

History
- First air date: 1984
- Former names: K-97 (1984–1993); 97.5 The River (1993–2018)
- Call sign meaning: "River", former brand

Technical information
- Licensing authority: CRTC
- Class: B
- ERP: 4,300 watts
- HAAT: 142.5 meters (468 ft)
- Transmitter coordinates: 50°40′14.88″N 120°23′56.40″W

Links
- Webcast: Listen Live
- Website: k975.ca

CKRV-FM is a radio station, broadcasting at 97.5 FM in Kamloops, British Columbia, Canada. The station broadcasts a classic rock format branded as K 97.5, and prior to 2010, it had a hot adult contemporary format. Even though as a top 40 station, it was still being classified as a hot AC station by Mediabase and Nielsen BDS. CKRV's shift to top 40 was plagued by CKBZ-FM shifting from adult contemporary to hot AC in the late 2000s.

== History ==
The station was launched in 1984 by Hal Yerxa's CFCW Ltd. It was acquired by Newcap Broadcasting in 1989, but was then sold to local broadcaster NL Broadcasting, the owner of AM station CHNL in the city, in 1993.

On February 20, 2015, CKRV-FM switched to a variety hits format as 97.5 The River, and adopted a new slogan Kamloops' best variety of the '80s, '90s and WOW, but kept the station's branding.

In June 2017, the station was reacquired by Newcap, along with sister stations CHNL and CJKC-FM.

In February 2018, CKRV rebranded to K 97.5 and flipped to classic hits.

On November 26, 2021, CKRV-FM flipped to classic rock, keeping the K 97.5 branding while changing to a new slogan of "Kamloops' Classic Rock" and changing its programming to match CKKO-FM.

The CKRV call sign was also used by an unrelated station in Drummondville (Quebec), which operated at 1400 AM from 1974 to 1980.

== Past station logos ==
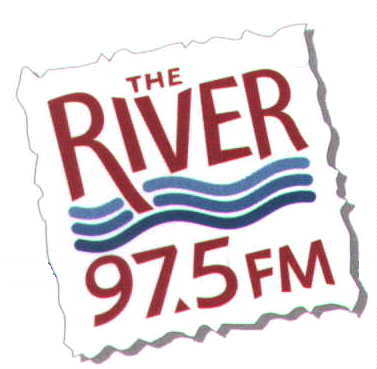
97.5 The River Logo 1997–2015.

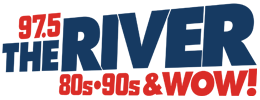
97.5 The River Logo 2015–2018.
