= CILV-FM =

Radio station in Ottawa, Ontario

Coordinates: 45°30′11″N 75°51′01″W

- Ottawa, Ontario; Canada
- Broadcast area: National Capital Region
- Frequency: 88.5 MHz
- Branding: Live 88.5

Programming
- Format: Alternative rock

Ownership
- Owner: Stingray Group
- Sister stations: CIHT-FM

History
- First air date: December 26, 2005
- Call sign meaning: LV for "Live"

Technical information
- Class: B
- ERP: 37,000 watts (90,000 watts maximum)
- HAAT: 130.7 metres (429 ft)

Links
- Website: live885.com

CILV-FM (88.5 MHz, Live 88.5) is a commercial FM radio station licensed to Ottawa, Ontario. Owned by Stingray Group, it broadcasts an alternative rock format. Its radio studios and offices are on Antares Drive in Nepean.

CILV-FM has an effective radiated power (ERP) of 37,000 watts (90,000 watts maximum). While most Ottawa FM stations have their towers in Gatineau Park, CILV-FM's transmitter is off Old Prescott Road near Spring Hill Road in Greely, Ontario.

== History ==
The station was licensed by the CRTC in 2005. CILV began testing its signal and streaming online on November 30, and officially signed on the air at Noon on December 26, 2005.

On May 27, 2015, the CRTC approved an application to move CILV's transmitter and increase its maximum effective radiated power (ERP) from 12,000 to 90,000 watts (average ERP from 2,300 to 37,000 watts) and decreasing the antenna's effective height above average terrain from 254.6 to 130.7 metres. However, a second-adjacent station in Perth, CHLK-FM 88.1, filed an intervention, specifying that such an increase could hamper their station's ability to improve its signal in the future.

== Community involvement ==
Since 2006, the station has been sponsoring an annual "Big Money Shot" contest for local musicians. In order to enter the contest, each group must submit a CD with 5 original songs, a band biography and picture. 60 artists are accepted into the contest. Past winners of the Live 88.5 Big Money Shot have included Hollerado, Amos the Transparent, The Balconies, Autumns Canon, The Love Machine, My Favourite Tragedy, Down in Ashes, Amanda Rheaume, The Goodluck Assembly, The Cardboard Crowns and Loudlove.

In 2011, the station partnered with the Rideau Valley Conservation Foundation to begin an annual program of planting trees in the suburban township of Beckwith, to offset its energy consumption.

In 2013, the station also paid to replace the fraying Flag of Canada flying at the gravesite of former Prime Minister Lester Pearson.
