= CIBX-FM =

Radio station in Fredericton, New Brunswick

Coordinates: 46°07′07″N 66°46′28″W

- Fredericton, New Brunswick; Canada
- Broadcast area: Greater Fredericton
- Frequency: 106.9 MHz
- Branding: Move 106.9

Programming
- Format: Adult contemporary
- Affiliations: Premiere Networks

Ownership
- Owner: Bell Media; (Bell Media Radio Atlantic Inc.)
- Sister stations: CKHJ, CFXY-FM

History
- First air date: 1926
- Former call signs: 10AD (1923–1926); CFNB (1926–1996)
- Former frequencies: 250 metres (1923–1926); 1210 kHz (AM) (1926–1933); 1030 kHz (1933–1934); 550 kHz (1934–1996)

Technical information
- Class: C1
- ERP: 78,000 watts, horizontal polarization only
- HAAT: 143.5 metres (471 ft)

Links
- Webcast: Listen Live
- Website: iheartradio.ca/move/fredericton

CIBX-FM (106.9 MHz) is a commercial radio station in Fredericton, New Brunswick, Canada, owned by Bell Media and known as Move 106.9. It broadcasts an adult contemporary format. The studios and offices are on Rookwood Avenue in Fredericton, shared with sister stations CFXY-FM and CKHJ.

CIBX-FM has an effective radiated power (ERP) of 78,000 watts, horizontal polarization only. The transmitter is on Provincial Route 620 at Route 617, at Hamtown Corner in Douglas, northwest of Fredericton.

== History ==
CIBX traces its history to the first radio station in New Brunswick, CFNB. The call letters stood for Fredericton, New Brunswick. The station went on the air under the experimental call sign of 10AD, broadcasting at 1210 kilocycles in 1923. It was granted a full license as CFNB in 1926. CFNB then moved to 1030 in 1933, and to 550 in 1934.

The station was affiliated with the CBC's Trans-Canada Network. In 1959 the station increased its power to 50,000 watts, giving it full-time coverage over most of the Maritime Provinces. The CBC affiliation was dropped in 1964 when the network started its own station in Fredericton, CBZ. CFNB played a full service, adult contemporary format before switching to oldies in the early 1990s.

In 1996, CFNB's parent company, Radio Atlantic, was granted permission to move its signal to 106.9 FM and to shut down the AM transmitter. The call sign changed in the process, and after a brief simulcast period, CFNB 550 signed off the air on June 11 of that year. The new station, CIBX, played soft adult contemporary music. The former CFNB call sign now belongs to a radio station in D'Arcy, British Columbia, known as CFNB-FM. Over time, CIBX evolved towards adult contemporary.

Between 2000 and 2005, CIBX used the on-air "EZ Rock" branding along with other stations in Canada, while using Capital FM as a secondary name. Eventually, "EZ Rock" was phased out as a moniker.

As of July 18, 2012, CIBX officially flipped to Top 40/CHR. It was one of two Top 40 outlets in the Fredericton radio market as it took on rival station CFRK-FM. The competition lasted nearly three years. On May 31, 2015, CFRK flipped to country music, which left CIBX as the only Top 40 station in the market.

CIBX and seven other radio stations in the Atlantic Provinces are currently owned by Bell Media.

In 2019, longtime morning show host Trevor Doyle was arrested in Puerto Rico after allegedly trying to solicit sex from a minor.

On December 27, 2020, as part of a mass format reorganization by Bell Media, CIBX shifted to Hot AC and rebranded as Move 106.9. While the station ran without DJs for the first week of the format, the on-air staff returned on January 4, 2021.

In 2022, CIBX flipped back to adult contemporary music.

== Former logos ==
2002-2004

2005-2012

2012-2020
