= CHHI-FM =

Radio station in New Brunswick, Canada

Coordinates: 47°03′32″N 65°34′35″W

- Miramichi, New Brunswick; Canada
- Broadcast area: Miramichi Valley
- Frequency: 95.9 MHz
- Branding: Rewind 95.9

Programming
- Format: Classic hits

Ownership
- Owner: Stingray Group

History
- First air date: May 6, 2013

Technical information
- Class: B1
- ERP: 11,000 watts average 25,000 watts peak
- HAAT: 85.8 metres (281 ft)

Links
- Webcast: Listen Live
- Website: rewind959.ca

CHHI-FM is a Canadian radio station broadcasting at 95.9 FM in Miramichi, New Brunswick, with a classic hits format branded on-air as Rewind 95.9 owned by Stingray Group. The station began broadcasting on May 6, 2013.

== History and broadcasting ==
The station received approval from the CRTC to operate on the FM frequency at 95.9 FM on May 18, 2012, and began broadcasting on May 6, 2013, at 9:59 am with the station's first song "Raise Your Glass" by Pink.

The station was originally proposed to have been carrying a country format, but switched to hot AC prior to the station's launch, following the change of formats at competing station CFAN-FM from adult contemporary to country.

Since the launch, the station has changed its format to adult hits in response to listener demand. On February 12, 2021, the station flipped to classic hits branded as Rewind 95.9.

Despite the different branding, the station is closely aligned with Stingray's Boom FM branded stations, with similar logo designs and partial sharing of programs and personalities.
