= CFXY-FM =

Radio station in New Brunswick, Canada

Coordinates: 46°07′07″N 66°46′28″W

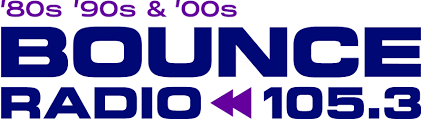
- Fredericton, New Brunswick; Canada
- Broadcast area: Greater Fredericton
- Frequency: 105.3 MHz
- Branding: Bounce 105.3

Programming
- Format: Adult hits
- Affiliations: Bounce Radio

Ownership
- Owner: Bell Media; (Bell Media Radio Atlantic Inc.)
- Sister stations: CIBX-FM, CKHJ

History
- First air date: July 15, 1983
- Former call signs: CKHJ-FM (1983–2000)
- Former frequencies: 93.1 MHz (1983–1992)
- Call sign meaning: Former "Foxy" branding

Technical information
- Class: C1
- ERP: 78,000 watts (horizontal polarization)
- HAAT: 143.5 metres (471 ft)

Links
- Webcast: Listen Live
- Website: iheartradio.ca/bounce/fredericton

CFXY-FM (105.3 MHz) is a Canadian radio station in Fredericton, New Brunswick. The station uses the on-air brand Bounce 105.3 with an adult hits format. The station is owned by Bell Media, which also owns sister stations CIBX-FM and CKHJ. The station's transmitter is off Route 620 at Hamtown Corner in Douglas, north west of Fredericton.

== History ==
CFXY was launched on July 15, 1983, as CKHJ-FM, and first operated at 93.1 on the FM dial. In 1992, CKHJ-FM received CRTC approval to change its frequency from 93.1 to 105.3 FM.

In June 2000, CIHI (1260 AM) changed its call sign and switched frequencies with co-owned country station CKHJ, which was at 105.3 FM.

The station was owned by Radio One Ltd. until 1999, when it was sold to Telemedia Communications. Telemedia sold the stations to Astral Media in 2002, which was then acquired by Bell Media as of 2013.

As part of a mass format reorganization by Bell Media, on May 18, 2021, CFXY flipped to adult hits, and adopted the Bounce branding.
