= CFRK-FM =

Radio station in Fredericton, New Brunswick

Coordinates: 46°07′07″N 66°46′28″W

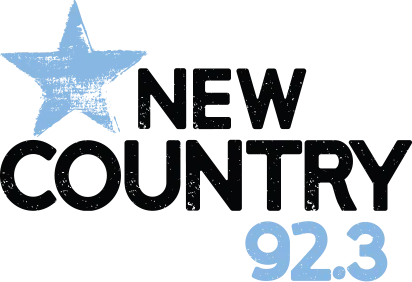
- Fredericton, New Brunswick; Canada
- Broadcast area: Greater Fredericton
- Frequency: 92.3 MHz
- Branding: New Country 92.3

Programming
- Format: Country

Ownership
- Owner: Stingray Group
- Sister stations: CIHI-FM

History
- First air date: July 28, 2005

Technical information
- Class: C1
- ERP: 42,000 watts average 100,000 watts peak
- HAAT: 137.5 metres (451 ft)

Links
- Website: newcountry923.com

CFRK-FM is a Canadian radio station broadcasting at 92.3 FM in Fredericton, New Brunswick owned by Stingray. The station airs a country format branded as New Country 92.3.

Based on the current format, CFRK competes with CKHJ who is predominantly an AM only station.

The station is the originating station for Weekend Country Heat, which is a Saturday evening program syndicated to most other Stingray country stations across Canada. Weekend Country Heat is hosted by station Program Director John Riordon, who is a former host of The Early Show on CFRK weekday mornings. The present morning host is Dave Lawrence. Middays are anchored by the syndicated Paul McGuire Show, Shilo Bellis hosts afternoons, and The Casey Clarke show fills evening hours.

== History ==
The station launched on July 28, 2005 under a classic rock/classic hits format branded as 92.3 Fred-FM with the first song being "Layla" by Derek & The Dominos. On March 1, 2013, at Noon, after playing "Free Bird" by Lynyrd Skynyrd, CFRK flipped to Top 40/CHR as Hot 92.3, whose logo and presentation was patterned after its sister station CIHT-FM in Ottawa. The first song played on "Hot" was "Scream & Shout" by will.i.am and Britney Spears.

On February 7, 2013, the CRTC approved Newcap's application to modify the technical parameters of the English language commercial radio programming undertaking CFRK-FM Fredericton by decreasing the station's average effective radiated power (ERP) from 93,000 to 42,000 watts (and by increasing the maximum ERP from 93,000 to 100,000 watts), by increasing the effective height of antenna above average terrain from 124.8 to 137.5 metres, by changing the radiation pattern of the antenna from non-directional to directional, and by relocating the antenna and transmitter from their current site at Hamtown Corner to Mount Hope.

On June 1, 2015, at Midnight, after playing "Amnesia" by Ilai Swindells, CFRK flipped to country, branded as New Country 92.3. The first song on "New Country" was "Sun Daze" by Florida Georgia Line. The lack of a local Country FM radio station prompted the format change.

== Former logos ==
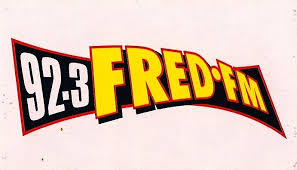
2005-2013

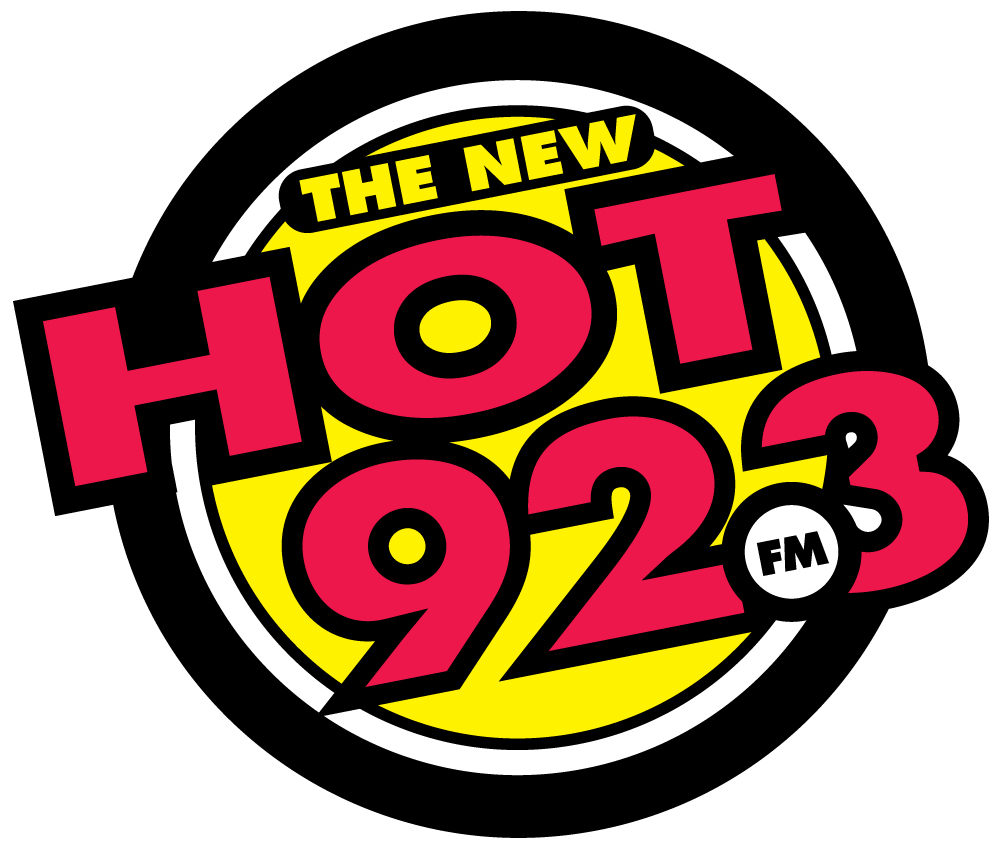
2013-2015

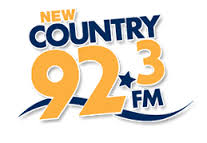
2015-2017

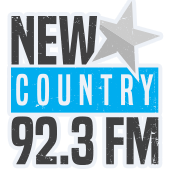
2017-2024
