= CFXE-FM =

Radio station in Edson, Alberta

Coordinates: 53°38′47″N 116°32′30″W

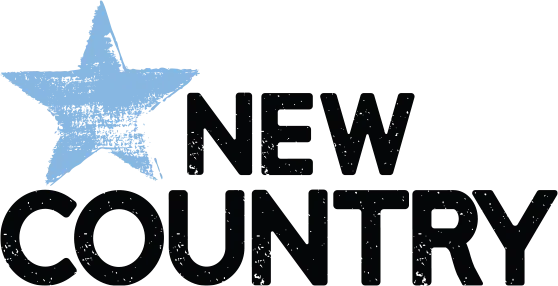
- Edson, Alberta; Canada
- Broadcast area: Edson, Hinton, Jasper, Grande Cache
- Frequency: 94.3 MHz
- Branding: New Country

Programming
- Format: Country
- Affiliations: Westwood One

Ownership
- Owner: Stingray Group

History
- First air date: April 4, 1968
- Former call signs: CJYR (1968–2010)
- Former frequencies: 970 kHz (1968–2007)
- Call sign meaning: Fox Edson (former branding and broadcast area)

Technical information
- Class: B
- ERP: 11,000 watts average 20,000 watts peak
- HAAT: 116.9 metres (384 ft)

Links
- Website: newcountrywest.ca

CFXE-FM (94.3 MHz) is a Canadian radio station licensed to Edson, Alberta. Owned by Stingray Group, it broadcasts a country format branded as New Country. Alongside its main signal in Edson, the station maintains three rebroadcasters in northwestern Alberta; CFXH-FM in Hinton, CFXP-FM in Jasper, and CFXG-FM in Grande Cache. The station also maintains a satellite studio in Hinton, and broadcasts their afternoon show (12 Noon - 6PM) from Hinton.

== History ==
CFXE signed on April 4, 1968, as CJYR on 970 kHz, with 10,000 watts power. In 2005, the station was bought by Newcap Broadcasting and was relaunched as The Fox. In 2007, the station was moved to 94.3 MHz with 11,000 watts power.

On September 29, 2010, the station received CRTC approval to move CFXE-FM's rebroadcast transmitter, CFXG (AM 1230) in Grande Cache, to the FM dial. Grande Cache's new FM transmitter now operates at 93.3 MHz known as CFXG-FM.

Previous logo

In July 2017, the station rebranded as Real Country, and flipped to country.

On March 4, 2024, the station rebranded as New Country to match the company's other country music stations.

== Rebroadcasters ==
Rebroadcasters of CFXE-FM
City of licence	Identifier	Frequency	Power	RECNet	CRTC Decision
Grande Cache	CFXG-FM	93.3 FM	190 watts	Query	2010-722
Hinton	CFXH-FM	97.5 FM	530 vertical/1,200 horizontal watts	Query	2003-616
Jasper	CFXP-FM	95.5 FM	95 watts	Query	2003-619
