= CIHT-FM =

Contemporary hit radio station in Ottawa

Coordinates: 45.33565°N 75.70633°W

- Ottawa, Ontario; Canada
- Broadcast area: National Capital Region
- Frequency: 89.9 MHz
- Branding: Hot 89.9

Programming
- Language: English
- Format: Contemporary hit radio

Ownership
- Owner: Stingray Group
- Sister stations: CILV-FM

History
- First air date: February 7, 2003
- Call sign meaning: Hot (branding)

Technical information
- Licensing authority: CRTC
- Class: C1
- ERP: 27,000 watts
- HAAT: 262.4 metres (861 ft)

Links
- Webcast: Listen live
- Website: www.hot899.com

CIHT-FM (89.9 FM, "Hot 89.9") is a radio station licensed to Ottawa, Ontario, Canada. Owned by Stingray Group, it broadcasts a contemporary hit radio format. CIHT's studios are located on Antares Drive in Nepean, while its transmitter is located in Camp Fortune, Quebec.

== History ==
The station was licensed by the CRTC in 2001 to Newcap Radio, to broadcast a rhythmic contemporary/dance music format known as The Planet 89.9. The station launched on February 7, 2003, as The New Hot 89.9 under a rhythmic contemporary format, but flipped to its current format after 105.3 Kiss FM signed on the air in 2004. Both CIHT and CHBN-FM in Edmonton share the distinction of having been shifted from rhythmic contemporary to Top 40 in less than a year after their 2003 sign-ons.

Even while CIHT is the only English Top 40 station in Ottawa, it was one of the few Top 40 stations in Canada to continue supporting older music, making CIHT lean towards more of a hot adult contemporary direction than most Top 40 stations in Canada, but on March 31, 2014, CIHT picked up new competition with CKQB-FM's flip from active rock to a rhythmic-leaning CHR format, a move that prompted CIHT to back off from the hot AC fare and become more hit-driven with more currents.

The station formerly produced the Stingray Hit List Countdown (formerly the Canadian Hit 40 and the Canadian Hit 30), a weekly countdown show that was syndicated to other Stingray sister stations but wrapped up production in March 2026.

== On Air ==
The Morning Hot Tub has been the morning show on the radio station since 2003. It is one of the most highly rated morning shows ever in Ottawa radio history, having been #1 A25-54 since 2009. Known for its unscripted, unpredictable, and humorous format, the program focuses on pop culture, entertainment news, and bizarre human-interest stories. The program is anchored by a four-person ensemble cast of Mauler, Rush, Jenni, and Brady.

In addition to its flagship morning slot from 6:00 AM to 10:00 AM, the brand extends across various syndication blocks, weekend programming like “Unscripted with Mauler, Rush, Jenni and Brady”, and “The Hot Tub Set Up” on Sunday nights, alongside a dedicated podcast format, “The Hot Tub Podcast”.

Described by the station as "unpredictable, unscripted, and unsupervised," The Morning Hot Tub shifts rapidly between traditional morning show tropes and chaotic, listener-driven topics. Daily broadcasts blend hit music, localized traffic and weather updates, and off the wall stories. Mainstays of the show include Crush Rush, The Wheel Of Fun, Fresh Baked Music, Brady’s Game Of Joy, The World According to Mauler and Rush, Jenni’s Hot Flashes and more all while taking live call-ins and texts from Ottawa listeners.

A defining pillar of The Morning Hot Tub is its extensive charity work in the National Capital Region. The show frequently utilizes its massive reach to coordinate high-profile fundraising campaigns. One of the show's most prominent philanthropic endeavors was the "27 Hours for Tomorrow" marathon broadcast. During this event, Mauler, Rush, Jenni, and Brady remain live on the air for 27 consecutive hours without sleep. Supported by corporate partnerships, the event raises critical funds for local infrastructure. In May 2026, the marathon successfully raised over $89,900 for the Ottawa Hospital Foundation to support the construction of Ottawa’s new state-of-the-art hospital facility. To incentivize public engagement during the broadcast, the hosts agree to perform specific, listener-submitted physical dares in exchange for tiered monetary donations.
