= CFLN-FM =

Radio station in Newfoundland and Labrador, Canada

Coordinates: 53°18′37″N 60°17′34″W

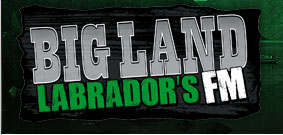
- Happy Valley-Goose Bay, Newfoundland and Labrador; Canada
- Broadcast area: Labrador
- Frequency: 97.9 MHz
- Branding: Big Land - Labrador's FM

Programming
- Format: Full-service: (News/Talk/Country/Classic hits)

Ownership
- Owner: Stingray Group

History
- First air date: September 28, 1974
- Former frequencies: 1230 kHz (1974–2009)
- Call sign meaning: Coming From Labrador North

Technical information
- Class: A
- ERP: 1 kW horizontal polarization only
- HAAT: 25.4 meters (83 ft)

Links
- Website: bigland.fm

CFLN-FM is a Canadian radio station in Happy Valley-Goose Bay, Newfoundland and Labrador, broadcasting on 97.9 MHz. Owned by Stingray Group, CFLN first went on the air on September 28, 1974, as an AM station on 1230 kHz before converting to its current frequency in 2009. The station's format primarily consists of country music with some News/Talk programming. The station was formerly branded Radio Labrador but is now branded Big Land – Labrador's FM.

CFLN has repeaters located in Labrador City/Wabush (CFLW-FM 94.7, formerly 1340 AM, opened on December 6, 1971, originally as a repeater of CFCB) and in Churchill Falls (CFLC-FM 97.9, opened on February 5, 1974).

On January 29, 2009, Newcap Radio applied to convert CFLN in Happy Valley-Goose Bay and its rebroadcaster CFLW to the FM dial, which officially occurred on June 16, 2009. These stations are now broadcasting on the following frequencies:

- CFLN-FM 97.9: Happy Valley-Goose Bay
- CFLW-FM 94.7: Wabush
- CFLC-FM 97.9: Churchill Falls

The stations received approval by the CRTC to convert to the FM band on June 16, 2009. On December 13, 2010, CFLN applied to add another FM transmitter at Northwest River to broadcast the programming of CFLN in Happy Valley-Goose Bay. The application to add a new FM transmitter which will operate on 95.9 MHz received CRTC approval on February 7, 2011.

- CFLN-1-FM 95.9: North West River
