= List of radio stations in Newfoundland and Labrador =

The following is a list of radio stations in the Canadian province of Newfoundland and Labrador, as of 2025.

Call sign	Frequency	City of licence	Owner	Network / Branding	Format
CFOZ-FM	100.3 FM	Argentia	Newfoundland Broadcasting	OZ FM	CHR/classic Rock
CKIM	1240 AM	Baie Verte	Stingray Group	590 VOCM	full service (news/talk/classic hits)
CBN-FM-6	95.5 FM	Baie Verte	Canadian Broadcasting Corporation	CBC Music	public music
CBTB-FM	97.1 FM	Baie Verte	Canadian Broadcasting Corporation	CBC Radio One	public news/talk
CJBI-FM	93.9 FM	Bell Island	Radio Bell Island	Radio Bell Island	community radio
CBNF-FM	89.1 FM	Bonne Bay	Canadian Broadcasting Corporation	CBC Radio One	public news/talk
CBGY	750 AM	Bonavista Bay	Canadian Broadcasting Corporation	CBC Radio One	public news/talk
VOAR-6-FM	101.1 FM	Botwood	The Seventh-day Adventist Church in Newfoundland & Labrador	Lighthouse FM	Christian radio
CHBI-FM	95.7 FM	Burnt Islands	Burnt Islands Economic Development Board	Burnt Islands 95.7 FM	community radio
CHVO-FM	103.9 FM	Carbonear	Stingray Group	New Country 103.9	country
CBGC-FM	92.5 FM	Carmanville	Canadian Broadcasting Corporation	CBC Radio One	public news/talk
CFGB-FM-1	93.9 FM	Cartwright	Canadian Broadcasting Corporation	CBC Radio One	public news/talk
CBSI-FM-3	89.1 FM	Churchill Falls	Canadian Broadcasting Corporation	Ici Radio-Canada Première	public news/talk (French)
CBQA-FM	91.1 FM	Churchill Falls	Canadian Broadcasting Corporation	CBC Radio One	public news/talk
CFLC-FM	97.9 FM	Churchill Falls	Stingray Group	Big Land	full service (news/talk/country)
CKVO	710 AM	Clarenville	Stingray Group	590 VOCM	full service (news/talk/classic hits)
CBNL-FM	93.7 FM	Clarenville	Canadian Broadcasting Corporation	CBC Radio One	public news/talk
CKLN-FM	97.1 FM	Clarenville	Stingray Group	New Country 103.9	country
VOCM-FM-1	100.7 FM	Clarenville	Stingray Group	97.5 K-Rock	classic rock
CJMY-FM	105.3 FM	Clarenville	Newfoundland Broadcasting	OZ FM	CHR/classic Rock
CKSJ-FM-1	107.5 FM	Clarenville	Coast Broadcasting	Coast 101.1	classic hits
CFCB	570 AM	Corner Brook	Stingray Group	590 VOCM	full service (news/talk/classic hits)
CBY	990 AM	Corner Brook	Canadian Broadcasting Corporation	CBC Radio One	public news/talk
CBN-FM-2	91.1 FM	Corner Brook	Canadian Broadcasting Corporation	CBC Music	public music
CKOZ-FM	92.3 FM	Corner Brook	Newfoundland Broadcasting	OZ FM	CHR/classic Rock
CKVB-FM	100.1 FM	Corner Brook	Bay of Islands Radio Inc.	100.1 BayFM	country/community radio
CKXX-FM	103.9 FM	Corner Brook	Stingray Group	97.5 K-Rock	classic rock
VOAR-9-FM	105.7 FM	Corner Brook	The Seventh-day Adventist Church in Newfoundland & Labrador	Lighthouse FM	Christian radio
CBN-FM-3	90.5 FM	Deer Lake	Canadian Broadcasting Corporation	CBC Music	public music
CBDT-FM	96.3 FM	Deer Lake	Canadian Broadcasting Corporation	CBC Radio One	public news/talk
CFDL-FM	97.9 FM	Deer Lake	Stingray Group	590 VOCM	full service (news/talk/classic hits)
VOAR-5-FM	102.1 FM	Deer Lake	The Seventh-day Adventist Church in Newfoundland & Labrador	Lighthouse FM	Christian radio
CBNU-FM	104.3 FM	Fermeuse	Canadian Broadcasting Corporation	CBC Radio One	public news/talk
CBGF-FM	101.7 FM	Fox Harbour	Canadian Broadcasting Corporation	CBC Radio One	public news/talk
CKGA	650 AM	Gander	Stingray Group	590 VOCM	full service (news/talk/classic hits)
CBG	1400 AM	Gander	Canadian Broadcasting Corporation	CBC Radio One	public news/talk
VOAR-4-FM	89.7 FM	Gander	The Seventh-day Adventist Church in Newfoundland & Labrador	Lighthouse FM	Christian radio
CKXD-FM	98.7 FM	Gander	Stingray Group	97.5 K-Rock	classic rock
CBNG-FM	101.5 FM	Glovertown	Canadian Broadcasting Corporation	CBC Radio One	public news/talk
CKCM	620 AM	Grand Falls-Windsor	Stingray Group	590 VOCM	full service (news/talk/classic hits)
CBN-FM-1	90.7 FM	Grand Falls-Windsor	Canadian Broadcasting Corporation	CBC Music	public music
CBT-FM	93.3 FM	Grand Falls-Windsor	Canadian Broadcasting Corporation	CBC Radio One	public news/talk
CHEV-FM	94.5 FM	Grand Falls-Windsor	Exploits Valley Community Radio Inc.	Valley Radio	community radio
CKMY-FM	95.9 FM	Grand Falls-Windsor	Newfoundland Broadcasting	OZ FM	CHR/classic Rock
VOAR-8-FM	98.3 FM	Grand Falls-Windsor	The Seventh-day Adventist Church in Newfoundland & Labrador	Lighthouse FM	Christian radio
CKXG-FM	102.3 FM	Grand Falls-Windsor	Stingray Group	97.5 K-Rock	classic rock
CBTJ-FM	101.5 FM	Hampden	Canadian Broadcasting Corporation	CBC Radio One	public news/talk
CFGB-FM	89.5 FM	Happy Valley-Goose Bay	Canadian Broadcasting Corporation	CBC Radio One	public news/talk
CFLN-FM	97.9 FM	Happy Valley-Goose Bay	Stingray Group	Big Land	full service (news/talk/country)
CKOH-FM	99.3 FM	Happy Valley-Goose Bay	Okalakatiget Society		First Nations community radio
VOAR-11-FM	101.9 FM	Happy Valley-Goose Bay	The Seventh-day Adventist Church in Newfoundland & Labrador	Lighthouse FM	Christian radio
CBNN-FM	91.1 FM	Hopedale	Canadian Broadcasting Corporation	CBC Radio One	public news/talk
CBSI-FM-4	93.1 FM	Labrador City	Canadian Broadcasting Corporation	Ici Radio-Canada Première	public news/talk (French)
CFLW-FM	94.7 FM	Labrador City	Stingray Group	Big Land	full service (news/talk/country)
CBDQ-FM	96.3 FM	Labrador City	Canadian Broadcasting Corporation	CBC Radio One	public news/talk
CJRM-FM	97.3 FM	Labrador City	Radio communautaire du Labrador Inc.	Rafale FM	community radio (French)
VOAR-12-FM	102.5 FM	Labrador City	The Seventh-day Adventist Church in Newfoundland & Labrador	Lighthouse FM	Christian radio
CFBS-FM-3	105.3 FM	L'Anse-au-Clair	Radio Blanc-Sablon		community radio NEW airdate to be announced
VOAR-3-FM	91.7 FM	Lewisporte	The Seventh-day Adventist Church in Newfoundland & Labrador	Lighthouse FM	Christian radio
CKXG-FM-1	101.3 FM	Lewisporte	Stingray Group	97.5 K-Rock	classic rock
CKIP-FM	96.1 FM	Mainland	Radio communautaire du Labrador Inc.	Rafale FM	community radio (French)
CIML-FM	99.5 FM	Makkovik	Makkovik Radio Society		First Nations community radio
CBNI-FM	103.5 FM	Makkovik	Canadian Broadcasting Corporation	CBC Radio One	public news/talk
CHCM-FM	88.3 FM	Marystown	Stingray Group	590 VOCM	full service (news/talk/classic hits)
CBNM-FM	90.3 FM	Marystown	Canadian Broadcasting Corporation	CBC Radio One	public news/talk
CBN-FM-5	91.7 FM	Marystown	Canadian Broadcasting Corporation	CBC Music	public music
VOAR-2-FM	99.5 FM	Marystown	The Seventh-day Adventist Church in Newfoundland & Labrador	Lighthouse FM	Christian radio
CBTL-FM	90.1 FM	Millertown	Canadian Broadcasting Corporation	CBC Radio One	public broadcasting news/talk
CICQ-FM	92.3 FM	Mount Pearl	Admiralty House Museum and Archives		tourist information
VOAR-FM	96.7 FM	Mount Pearl	The Seventh-day Adventist Church in Newfoundland & Labrador	Lighthouse FM	Christian radio
CBYM-FM	98.7 FM	Mount St. Margaret	Canadian Broadcasting Corporation	CBC Radio One	public news/talk
CBNZ-FM	95.1 FM	Nain	Canadian Broadcasting Corporation	CBC Radio One	public news/talk
CKOK	99.9 FM	Nain	Okalakatiget Society		First Nations community radio
VF2095	100.9 FM	Natuashish	Davis Inlet Community Television Service	CBC Radio One	public news/talk
CHBB-FM	95.9 FM	Norris Point	Bonne Bay Cottage Hospital Heritage Corporation		community radio
CFLN-1-FM	95.9 FM	North West River	Stingray Group	Big Land	full service (news/talk/country)
CBNV-FM	94.1 FM	Placentia	Canadian Broadcasting Corporation	CBC Radio One	public news/talk
CBAF-FM-16	94.3 FM	Port au Port	Canadian Broadcasting Corporation	Ici Radio-Canada Première	public news/talk (French)
CBNE-FM	91.9 FM	Port aux Basques	Canadian Broadcasting Corporation	CBC Radio One	public news/talk
CFGN-FM	96.7 FM	Port aux Basques	Stingray Group	590 VOCM	full service (news/talk/classic hits)
VOAR-10-FM	99.9 FM	Port aux Basques	The Seventh-day Adventist Church in Newfoundland & Labrador	Lighthouse FM	Christian radio
CFNW-FM	96.7 FM	Port au Choix	Stingray Group	590 VOCM	full service (news/talk/classic hits)
CBNP-FM	105.1 FM	Port Hope Simpson	Canadian Broadcasting Corporation	CBC Radio One	public news/talk
CBNJ-FM	90.5 FM	Port Saunders	Canadian Broadcasting Corporation	CBC Radio One	public news/talk
CBYP-FM	89.5 FM	Portland Creek	Canadian Broadcasting Corporation	CBC Radio One	public news/talk
CJPL-FM	89.9 FM	Postville	Postville Radio Society		First Nations community radio
CBND-FM	105.1 FM	Postville	Canadian Broadcasting Corporation	CBC Radio One	public news/talk
CBNR-FM	95.5 FM	Ramea	Canadian Broadcasting Corporation	CBC Radio One	public news/talk
CHLR-FM	89.9 FM	Rigolet	Rigolet Radio Society		First Nations community radio
CBTR-FM	92.9 FM	Roddickton	Canadian Broadcasting Corporation	CBC Radio One	public news/talk
CJIK-FM	94.1 FM	Sheshatshiu	Sheshatshiu Radio Society		First Nations community radio
CBNS-FM	99.1 FM	St Alban's	Canadian Broadcasting Corporation	CBC Radio One	public news/talk
CBNH-FM	93.7 FM	St. Andrew's	Canadian Broadcasting Corporation	CBC Radio One	public news/talk
CFCV-FM	97.7 FM	St. Andrew's	Stingray Group	590 VOCM	full service (news/talk/classic hits)
CFNN-FM	97.9 FM	St. Anthony	Stingray Group	590 VOCM	full service (news/talk/classic hits)
CBNA-FM	100.3 FM	St. Anthony	Canadian Broadcasting Corporation	CBC Radio One	public news/talk
VOCM	590 AM	St. John's	Stingray Group	590 VOCM	full service (news/talk/classic hits)
CBN	640 AM	St. John's	Canadian Broadcasting Corporation	CBC Radio One	public news/talk
VOWR	800 AM	St. John's	Wesley United Church	VOWR	community / Christian radio
CJYQ	930 AM	St. John's	Stingray Group	New Country 930	country
CBN-1-FM	88.5 FM	St. John's	Canadian Broadcasting Corporation	CBC Radio One	public news/talk
CHMR-FM	93.5 FM	St. John's	Memorial University of Newfoundland Radio Society	93.5 CHMR	campus radio
CHOZ-FM	94.7 FM	St. John's	Newfoundland Broadcasting	OZ FM	CHR/classic Rock
VOCM-FM	97.5 FM	St. John's	Stingray Group	97.5 K-Rock	classic rock
CKIX-FM	99.1 FM	St. John's	Stingray Group	Hot 99.1	CHR/Top 40
CKSJ-FM	101.1 FM	St. John's	Coast Broadcasting	Coast 101.1	classic hits
CBAX-FM-2	101.9 FM	St. John's	Canadian Broadcasting Corporation	Ici Musique	classical/jazz (French)
CBAF-FM-17	105.9 FM	St. John's	Canadian Broadcasting Corporation	Ici Radio-Canada Première	public news/talk (French)
CBN-FM	106.9 FM	St. John's	Canadian Broadcasting Corporation	CBC Music	public music
CKCM-1-FM	89.3 FM	Springdale	Stingray Group	590 VOCM	full service (news/talk/classic hits)
VOAR-7-FM	103.3 FM	Springdale	The Seventh-day Adventist Church in Newfoundland & Labrador	Lighthouse FM	Christian radio
CFSX	870 AM	Stephenville	Stingray Group	590 VOCM	full service (news/talk/classic hits)
CBNC-FM	88.7 FM	Stephenville	Canadian Broadcasting Corporation	CBC Radio One	public news/talk
CBN-FM-4	95.1 FM	Stephenville	Canadian Broadcasting Corporation	CBC Music	public music
CKXX-FM-1	95.9 FM	Stephenville	Stingray Group	97.5 K-Rock	classic rock
CIOS-FM	98.5 FM	Stephenville	Newfoundland Broadcasting	OZ FM	CHR/classic Rock
CBNX-FM	92.1 FM	St. Vincent's	Canadian Broadcasting Corporation	CBC Radio One	public news/talk
CBNO-FM	104.3 FM	Swift Current	Canadian Broadcasting Corporation	CBC Radio One	public news/talk
CBNQ-FM	95.3 FM	Trepassey	Canadian Broadcasting Corporation	CBC Radio One	public news/talk

== See also ==
- List of radio stations in the Americas
