= Media in St. John's, Newfoundland and Labrador =

This is a list of media in St. John's, Newfoundland and Labrador.

== Radio ==
St. John's is currently the only Canadian city served by radio stations whose call letters do not all begin with the letter C. The ITU prefix VO was assigned to the Dominion of Newfoundland before the province joined Canadian Confederation in 1949, and three AM stations kept their existing call letters; the Broadcasting Corporation of Newfoundland's VONF, however, was taken over by CBC Radio and adopted the new call sign CBN. However, radio stations in St. John's which went to air after 1949 use the same range of prefixes (CF–CK) currently in use elsewhere in Canada, with the exception of VOCM-FM, which was permitted to adopt the VOCM callsign because of its corporate association with the AM station that already bore that callsign. VO also remains in use in amateur radio.

Frequency	Call sign	Branding	Format	Owner	Notes
590 AM	VOCM	590 VOCM	news/talk/classic hits	Stingray Digital Group Inc.	
640 AM	CBN	CBC Radio One	news/talk	Canadian Broadcasting Corporation	
800 AM	VOWR	VOWR	Christian radio	Wesley United Church	
930 AM	CJYQ	New Country	Country music	Stingray Digital Group Inc.	
88.5 FM	CBN-1-FM	CBC Radio One	news/talk	Canadian Broadcasting Corporation	
93.5 FM	CHMR-FM		campus radio	Memorial University of Newfoundland Students' Union	
94.7 FM	CHOZ-FM	OZFM	hot adult contemporary	Newfoundland Broadcasting	
96.7 FM	VOAR-FM	Lighthouse FM	Christian radio	Seventh-day Adventist Church in Newfoundland & Labrador	licensed to Mount Pearl
97.5 FM	VOCM-FM	97.5 K-Rock	classic rock	Stingray Digital Group Inc.	
99.1 FM	CKIX-FM	Hot 99.1 FM	Contemporary hit radio	Stingray Digital Group Inc.	
101.1 FM	CKSJ-FM	Coast 101.1	classic hits	Coast Broadcasting	
101.9 FM	CBAX-FM-2	Ici Musique	public music	Canadian Broadcasting Corporation	French
105.9 FM	CBAF-FM-17	Ici Radio-Canada Première	news/talk	Canadian Broadcasting Corporation	French
106.9 FM	CBN-FM	CBC Music	public music	Canadian Broadcasting Corporation	

== Television ==
OTA virtual channel (PSIP)	OTA channel	Rogers Cable	Call sign	Network	Notes
4.1	4 (VHF)	12	CBFJ-TV	Ici Radio-Canada Télé	
8.1	8 (VHF)	3	CBNT-DT	CBC Television	
21.1	21 (UHF)	5	CJON-DT	Independent	Sublicenses programming from CTV, Global, and Yes TV

Rogers Cable has its provincial headquarters in St. John’s and is the incumbent cable provider in the city. Its community channel Rogers TV airs local shows such as Out of the Fog and One Chef One Critic. Network television in the United States is piped in from Boston and Detroit via Rogers Cable.

== Print ==
- The Telegram (daily newspaper)
- Newfoundland Quarterly (literary magazine founded in 1901, now published by Memorial University)
- The Independent (weekly newspaper, discontinued in print but available online)
- The Express (weekly newspaper, now discontinued)
- The Muse (formerly weekly or, during summer months, bi-monthly Memorial University student newspaper) – The Muse stopped print circulation in the fall of 2017 in order to deal with ongoing budget difficulties and is now a strictly online publication.
- The Gazette ( bi-monthly Memorial University newspaper)
- Le Gaboteur (Newfoundland and Labrador's only French-language newspaper; bi-monthly)
- The Scope (a defunct alternative newspaper)
- The Overcast (a defunct Monthly Alternative Newspaper)
- The Daily News (1955–1984)

== Online ==
AllNewfoundlandLabrador.com is an online newspaper which covers business news from around the province. The subscription news service publishes five days a week and was launched in 2016 by sister publication allNovaScotia which is based in Halifax, Nova Scotia. The two publications have a newsroom staff of 25 reporters, editors and columnists.
