= Broadcast call signs =

Unique identifiers assigned to radio and television stations

Broadcast call signs are call signs assigned as unique identifiers to radio stations and television stations. While broadcast radio stations will often brand themselves with plain-text names, identities such as "cool FM", "rock 105" or "the ABC network" are not globally unique. Another station in another city or country may (and often will) have a similar brand, and the name of a broadcast station for legal purposes is normally its internationally recognised ITU call sign. Some common conventions are followed around the world.

Excluding those used in amateur radio, call signs are traditionally only used in the Americas and few countries west of the Pacific Ocean such as Australia, Japan, the Philippines, South Korea and Taiwan.

== North America ==
Broadcast stations in North America generally use callsigns in the international series.

=== International shortwave ===
The US government-operated international broadcaster the Voice of America no longer uses callsigns assigned to it; however, Radio Canada International's transmitter in Sackville, New Brunswick was assigned CKCX. Privately operated shortwave stations, like WWCR and CFRX, also have call signs.

=== Canada ===
In Canada, the publicly owned Canadian Broadcasting Corporation uses CB; privately owned commercial broadcast stations use primarily CF and CH through CK prefixes. Four stations licensed to St. John's by the Dominion of Newfoundland government (VOWR, VOAR-FM, VOCM, and VOCM-FM) retain their original VO calls. The CB prefix used by CBC stations actually belongs to Chile rather than Canada, and is in use by the CBC through an international agreement. Low-power broadcast translator stations begin with VF for FM and CH for TV, followed by four numerals assigned sequentially. Unlike the United States, all digital TV stations use the "-DT" suffix instead of keeping the "-TV" suffix.

=== Mexico ===
In Mexico, AM radio stations use XE call signs (such as XEW-AM), while the majority of FM radio and television stations use XH. Broadcast callsigns are normally four or five letters in length, plus the -FM or -TV suffix where applicable, though several older stations have only three letters. The longest callsign is six letters, plus suffix: XHMORE-FM. All Mexican TV stations using digital TV signals use the "-TDT" suffix.

=== United States ===
In the United States, the first letter is generally K for stations west of the Mississippi River (including Alaska, American Samoa, Guam, Hawaii, and Northern Mariana Islands) and W for those east of the Mississippi River (including Puerto Rico and the U.S. Virgin Islands). Except for those with their radio channel or physical TV channel number in them, all new callsigns have been four letters (plus any suffix like -FM or -TV) for some decades, though there are historical three-letter callsigns still in use today, such as KSL in Salt Lake City and WGN in Chicago. Co-owned stations were also allowed to adopt their original short AM callsign like WGN-TV and KSL-TV, even after new ones were prohibited.

There are a number of exceptions to the east/west rule, such as KDKA in Pittsburgh and WFAA in Dallas-Fort Worth, but these are historical artifacts grandfathered from a rule change in the 1920s. Most of the exceptions are located in the media markets immediately adjacent to the river, in the state of Louisiana in the metropolitan areas of Baton Rouge and greater New Orleans, and markets north of the river's source such as Fargo-Moorhead and Duluth-Superior.

The westernmost station in the continental United States beginning with W is WOAI in San Antonio. WVUV-FM in Fagaitua, American Samoa, is the westernmost station with a W call sign. KYW in Philadelphia is currently the easternmost station with a K call sign.

Another exception to this is that NIST time-broadcasting stations have a three- or four-letter callsign beginning with WWV. The three current government-operated time stations, WWV (and longwave sister station WWVB), and WWVH, are located in Fort Collins, Colorado and Kekaha, Hawaii, respectively, both of which would normally use call signs beginning with "K". However, the rule dividing W and K only applies to stations governed by the Federal Communications Commission (FCC), whereas U.S. federal government stations are governed by the NTIA. This means that like NIST, the hundreds of NOAA Weather Radio stations across the country have a random mix of W and K callsigns, as do traveler information stations operated by the National Park Service.

== Central America ==
=== Costa Rica ===
Costa Rica uses TI call signs. Examples:

- TI-TNS (channel 2)
- TI-IVS (channel 4)
- TI-TV6 (channel 6)
- TI-TCR (channel 7)
- TI-DE (channel 9)
- TI-BYK (channel 11)
- TI-SRN (channel 13)

=== El Salvador ===
El Salvador uses YS, YX and HU call signs depending on geographical area. Examples:

- YSR-TV (channel 2)
- YSU-TV (channel 4)
- YSLA-TV (channel 6)
- YSWX-TV (channel 12)

=== Guatemala ===
Guatemala uses TG call signs. Examples:

- TGV-TV (channel 3)
- TGVG-TV (channel 7)
- TGMO-TV (channel 11)
- TGSS-TV (channel 13)

=== Honduras ===
Honduras uses HR call signs. Examples:

- HRTG-TV (channel 5)
- HRLP-TV (Telecadena)
- HRCV-TV (TSi)

=== Nicaragua ===
Nicaragua uses YN call signs. Examples:

- YNTC: Channel 2
- YNTM: Channel 4
- YNSA: Channel 6
- YNLG: Channel 12

== Caribbean ==
=== Dominican Republic ===
The Dominican Republic uses HI callsigns. Examples:

- HIJB: Channel 2/11
- HISD: Channel 4
- HITM: Channel 5
- HIN: Channel 7
- HIMQ: Channel 9
- HIND: Channel 13

== Oceania ==
=== Australia ===
In Australia, broadcast call signs are allocated by the Australian Communications and Media Authority and are unique for each broadcast station.

The international VL prefix assigned to radio broadcasters has been skipped for many years, thus VL5UV would only identify as 5UV, and now simply Radio Adelaide. The digit often, but not always, indicates the state or territory, generally followed by two letters on AM and three on FM. Stations with call signs beginning in 2 are based in New South Wales or the ACT, 3 in Victoria, 4 in Queensland, 5 in South Australia, 6 in Western Australia, 7 in Tasmania, and 8 in the Northern Territory.

== South America ==
In South America call signs have been a traditional way of identifying radio and TV stations. Some stations still broadcast their call signs a few times a day, but this practice is becoming very rare. Argentinian broadcast call signs consist of two or three letters followed by multiple numbers, the second and third letters indicating region.

=== Argentina ===
Argentina uses the prefixes LR through LW, followed by a number. The exact prefix depends on the region where they operate (for example: the LS prefix is used for radio and TV stations in the Buenos Aires city). Stations with the LR prefix may also have an additional letter.

Examples:

- LS82TV: Televisión Pública
- LS83TV: Channel 9
- LS84TV: Telefe
- LS85TV: Channel 13

=== Bolivia ===
Bolivia uses CP call signs. Examples:

- Bolivia TV: CP 3 TV
- Bolivisión: CP 42 TV
- Red Uno: CP 37 TV

=== Brazil ===
In Brazil, radio and TV stations are identified by a ZY, a third letter and three numbers. ZYA, ZYB, ZYR, and ZYT are allocated to television stations; ZYI, ZYJ, ZYK and ZYL designate AM stations; ZYG is used for shortwave stations; ZYC, ZYD, ZYM and ZYU are given to FM stations.

=== Chile ===
Chilean AM radio stations use the letter C, followed by one of the letters: A, B, C, D. The usage of each of those depends on the latitude of the cities where they operate (for example: the letter B is used for stations in the central region of Chile). FM stations use the XQ prefix, with the same A-E additional letters for AM stations. The resulting prefix is followed by a number which may not match their FM frequency. Television stations also have callsigns; however, they are mostly unknown, as they have never been shown on-air (instead, most Chilean TV stations identify themselves only with their names, similar to stations in Europe). TV call signs follow a similar pattern to those for FM stations, but begin with the XR prefix.

Examples:

- XQB-8: Radio Agricultura
- XQB-143: Radio Cooperativa
- XRB-94: Televisión Nacional de Chile

=== Colombia ===
In Colombia, the radio stations or television channels are identified by HJ and/or HK with two additional letters. Examples:

- HJRN: Channel 1
- HJJX: RCN
- HJCY: Caracol TV

=== Paraguay ===
Paraguay uses ZPV-(three digit number)-TV call signs. Example:

- SNT: ZPV 900 TV

=== Peru ===
Peru uses callsigns OA-OC callsigns. In each, it is followed by another letter, a dash and the number 4, followed by another letter. Example:

- OAY-4A: Panamericana Televisión

=== Uruguay ===
Uruguay uses CXB followed by a number as a callsign.

=== Venezuela ===
Venezuela uses YV call signs. Examples:

- YVKS: Channel 2 RCTV (defunct)
- YVLV: Channel 4 Venevisión
- YVKA: Channel 5 TVN (defunct)

== Asia ==
=== Indonesia ===
In Indonesia, radio stations are assigned call signs beginning with PM for AM and FM stations or YB-YH for amateur radio stations. Calls beginning with PM are then followed by a number indicating the province where the station is in, the letters B, C, D and F (B for AM stations, C for some stations in Kalimantan, D for some stations in Sumatra, and F for FM stations), and two unique characters. Television stations in Indonesia never use call signs, and their use is practically unknown.

=== Japan ===
In Japan, radio & television stations use calls beginning with JO.

=== Philippines ===
In the Philippines, stations may use callsigns in the following manner: callsigns beginning with DW and DZ represent all stations in Metro Manila and parts of Luzon. Calls beginning with DY represent all stations in Visayas, parts of Palawan, and Masbate; and callsigns beginning with DX represents all stations in Mindanao. Originally from 1920 to 1940, callsigns beginning with KZ were assigned to all stations in the Philippines.

=== Taiwan ===
Taiwan uses BET followed by a number as a callsign. Examples:

- TTV: BET61
- CTS: BET31
- PTS: BET52 (Huoyan Mountain Transmitter Station)

== Callbooks ==
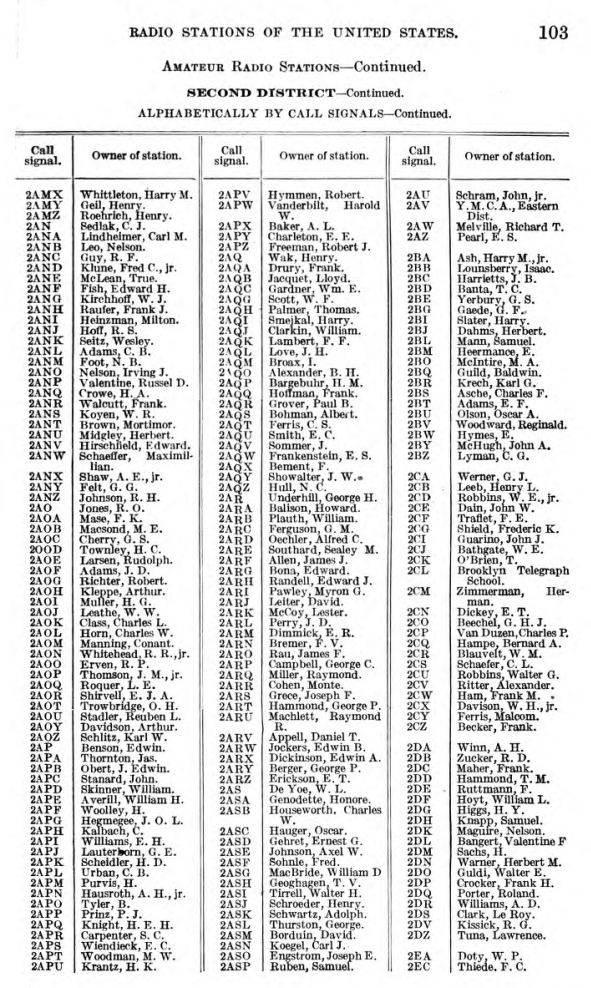
Page from an FCC callbook, 1919

A directory of radio station call signs is called a callbook. Callbooks were originally bound books that resembled a telephone directory and contains the name and addressees of licensed radio stations in a given jurisdiction (country). Modern Electrics published the first callbook in the United States in 1909.

Today, the primary purpose of a callbook is to allow amateur radio operators to send a confirmation post card, called a QSL card, to an operator with whom they have communicated via radio. Callbooks have evolved to include on-line databases that are accessible via the Internet to instantly obtain the address of another amateur radio operator and their QSL Managers. The most well known and used on-line QSL databases include QRZ.COM, IK3QAR, HamCall, F6CYV, DXInfo, OZ7C and QSLInfo.

== See also ==
- Amateur radio call signs
- ITU prefix
- Pseudonym
- Station identification
