= Call signs in Canada =

Official identifiers assigned to radio and television stations in Canada

Call signs in Canada are official identifiers issued to the country's radio and television stations. Assignments for broadcasting stations are made by the Canadian Radio-television and Telecommunications Commission (CRTC), while amateur stations receive their call signs from Innovation, Science and Economic Development Canada (previously Industry Canada). Conventional radio and television broadcasting stations assignments are generally three, four or five letters long (not including the "–FM", "–TV", or "–DT" suffix) and almost exclusively use "C" call signs; with a few exceptions noted below, the "V" calls are restricted to specialized uses such as amateur radio.

Call sign prefixes are coordinated internationally by the International Telecommunication Union (ITU), and Canada has been assigned CF–CK, VA–VG, VO, VX-VY and XJ–XO. "CB" series calls are officially assigned to Chile by the ITU, but Canada makes de facto use of this series for stations belonging to, but not exclusively broadcasting programs from, the Canadian Broadcasting Corporation (CBC).

Special broadcast undertakings such as Internet radio, cable FM, carrier current or closed circuit stations may sometimes be known by unofficial identifiers such as "CSCR". These are not governed by the Canadian media regulation system, and may be letter sequences that would not be permissible for a conventional broadcast station.

Three-letter call signs are only permitted to CBC Radio stations or to commercial stations which received their three-letter call sign before the current rules were adopted.

== Assignments ==
The International Telecommunication Union has assigned Canada the following call sign blocks: Note that the two-letter national prefix may be followed by other letters or by numbers or by a combination of both. For example there can be call signs such as CFD, CFAB, CF3428, CFW325, CF3ABC, etc. as long as they commence with one of the two-letter national prefixes assigned to Canada.

Call sign block
CF-CK
CY-CZ
VA-VG
VO-VO
VX-VY
XJ-XO

== Broadcasting stations ==
Most broadcasting stations have four-letter call signs (not including the "–FM", "–TV", or "–DT" suffix). Three-letter call signs are only permitted to CBC Radio stations or to commercial stations which received their three-letter call sign before the current rules were adopted. Five-letter call signs exclusively identify CBC transmitters (which may be either rebroadcasters or Ici Radio-Canada Télé owned-and-operated stations outside of Quebec).

Stations of the Canadian Broadcasting Corporation tend to identify themselves as "CBC Radio One"/"CBC Radio Two" (English-language) or "La Première Chaîne"/"Espace Musique" (French-language) of a city, although they do have official three- and four- letter call signs. These generally (but not always) begin with "CB". "VO" call signs may only be used commercially by stations in Newfoundland and Labrador which were licensed before that province joined the Canadian Confederation in 1949 (VOCM, VOAR and VOWR broadcast from St. John's long before confederation). Only one station, VOCM-FM, has been allowed to adopt a "VO" call sign as part of Canada. It was granted the VOCM calls because of its corporate association with the AM station. Note however that stations throughout Canada that are rebroadcasters of VOAR in Newfoundland do also have VO call signs. For example, VOAR-13-FM is located in Bridgewater, Nova Scotia. VOAR is rebroadcast via internet connections in areas far removed from Newfoundland due to its unique Seventh Day Adventist Christian format.

Call signs with four digits preceded by "VF" (for radio) or "CH" (for television) are only assigned to very-low-power local services, such as rebroadcasters or limited-interest stations similar to Part 15 operations in the United States. All Canadian FM stations have an "–FM" suffix, except for low-power rebroadcasters which have semi-numeric "VF" call signs. Higher-power rebroadcasters are generally licensed under the call sign of the originating station, followed by a numeric suffix and, for FM re-broadcasters of an AM station, a "–FM" suffix. For example, CJBC-1-FM rebroadcasts CJBC (860 Toronto), whereas CJBC-FM-1 rebroadcasts CJBC-FM (90.3 Toronto). Some rebroadcasters, however, may have their own distinct call signs.

Canadian television stations use the "-TV" suffix, with the exception of those CBC-owned stations which have a call sign in the "CB-(-)T" format. Canadian digital transitional television undertakings have "-DT" suffixes, even where the base call sign is a CBC/Radio-Canada O&O in pattern "CB(insert third letter)T", "CB(insert third letter)ET" or "CB(insert third letter)FT" (respectively for English language or French language television). For instance, Ici Radio-Canada Télé's O&O CBOFT-DT would represent "CBC Ottawa Français Télévision - Digital Television". Canada does not use the "-LP" or "-CA" suffixes that are in use in the United States.

For rebroadcasters which use a numeric suffix, the suffixes usually follow a 1–2–3 numeric sequence, which indicates the chronological order in which rebroadcast transmitters were added. There are some cases where television rebroadcasters are suffixed with the channel number on which the transmitter broadcasts (for instance, CIII-DT's rebroadcasters are numbered with their channel assignment rather than sequentially), but this is not generally the norm.

== Amateur radio ==
Geographical distribution of Canadian amateur radio call sign prefixes

Innovation, Science and Economic Development Canada regulates all aspects of amateur radio in the country. It assigns call signs, issues amateur radio licences, conducts exams, allots frequency spectrum, and monitors transmissions.

Canadian amateur radio stations call signs generally begin with "VE", "VA", “VO” or "VY". The number following these letters indicates the province, going from "VA1"/"VE1" for Nova Scotia, "VA2"/"VE2" (Québec), "VE3"/"VA3" (Ontario) through "VA7"/"VE7" for British Columbia and "VE8" for the Northwest Territories, with latecomer "VE9" for New Brunswick. ("VE1" used to be for all three Maritime provinces.) "VE0" is for maritime mobile amateur transmissions. "VY1" is used for the Yukon Territory, "VY2" for Prince Edward Island, and "VY0" for Nunavut. "CY0" and "CY9" are Sable Island (population 3) and St. Paul Island (uninhabited); with little or no local population, reception of these distant points is rare, although amateur radio stations do temporarily operate from these islands during shortwave radio contests. Special prefixes are often issued for stations operating at significant events.

Amateur radio operators are required to transmit their call sign in either English or French at the beginning and end of each period of exchange of communication or test transmission and at intervals of no more than 30 minutes throughout the period of exchange of communication.

While not directly related to call signs, the International Telecommunication Union (ITU) has further divided all countries assigned amateur radio prefixes into three regions; Canada is located in ITU Region 2. These regions are further divided into two overlapping zone systems: the ITU zone and the CQ zone.

The Dominion of Newfoundland prefix "VO" remains in active use by amateurs in the province of Newfoundland and Labrador, VO1AA atop Signal Hill in St. Johns being the most famous amateur station. Radio amateurs on the Island of Newfoundland use calls beginning with "VO1", while Labrador amateurs use "VO2". A popular backronym for "VO" stations is "Voice of...", although prefixes do not have any official meaning.

There are 68,000 licensed operators in Canada with call signs. The Canadian federal government's Innovation, Science and Economic Development Canada allots the individual call signs to the radio amateurs it licenses. There are 24 possible 2-letter prefixes and 240 2-letter/1-number prefixes available to Canadian operators based on the ITU blocks (CF–CK, CY–CZ, VA–VG, VO, VX–VY and XJ–XO). There are potentially approximately 4,340,000 call signs available in Canada.

Of these prefixes, 5 are currently assigned (CY, VA, VE, VO, and VY) for normal amateur radio operation. Innovation, Science and Economic Development Canada assigns regular operating call signs from 25 prefix/numeral blocks (e.g. VE1, CY9....). The other prefixes are assigned for special event operation for a time-limited period.

For Canadian amateur licences, suffixes of radio call signs usually comprise two or three letters, the former being available only to amateurs who have been licensed for 5 years or more. Amateurs can hold only one two-letter suffix call sign, but as many three-letter suffix call signs as they wish.

There are 18,252 possible combinations of two- or three-letter suffix call signs per prefix. Innovation, Science and Economic Development Canada follows Article 19 of the ITU Radio Regulations by disallowing 156 suffix-combinations because they may be confused with 3-letter communications signals (i.e. Q-codes) or other combinations which can be confused with distress signals. The Recommendation ITU-R M.1172 lists groups of letters from QOA to QUZ as abbreviations and signals to be used in radiotelegraphy communications. 'SOS' is also generally excluded, however the old distress call of 'CQD' can be allocated.

For occasional special events, 1-, 4-, or -5 letter suffixes can be assigned to a licensed operator for a specific period of time.

Canada is assigned DXCC entity #1, with the exception of Sable Is. and St.-Paul Is. which are DXCC entities #211 & #252 respectively. Call sign prefixes are issued according to one's province or territory of residence by the following table:

Prefixes	Province/Territory	ITU Region	ITU Zone	CQ Zone	# within prefix issued	# amateurs
VE1 VA1	Nova Scotia	2	9	5	2,986	2,536
VE2 VA2	Quebec	2	4, 9	2, 5	17,031	16,975
VE3 VA3	Ontario	2	3, 4	2, 4, 5	20,623	20,752
VE4 VA4	Manitoba	2	3	4	1,844	1,810
VE5 VA5	Saskatchewan	2	3	4	1,465	1,452
VE6 VA6	Alberta	2	2	4	5,942	5,967
VE7 VA7	British Columbia	2	2	3	13,836	14,130
VE8	Northwest Territories	2	2, 3	1	113	73
VE9	New Brunswick	2	9	5	1,447	1,853
VE0*	International Waters				582	0*
VO1	Newfoundland	2	9	5	1,260	1,242
VO2	Labrador	2	9	2	179	66
VY1	Yukon	2	2	1	186	172
VY2	Prince Edward Island	2	9	5	273	335
VY9**	Government of Canada				5	
VY0	Nunavut	2	3, 4	2	37	19
CY0***	Sable Is.	2	9	5	0	0
CY9***	St-Paul Is.	2	9	5	0	0
	Overseas addresses					29

*	VE0 call signs are only intended for use when the amateur radio station is operated from a vessel that makes international voyages. First assigned in 1954, Canada is the only country to assign a special prefix to operators on its ships in international waters. None of the operators reside at sea, but have residence within one of the other call-sign areas.
**	Industry Canada lists five (5) call signs with VY9 prefix issued to individuals related to that government department. These individuals reside in or near Ottawa, as well as Sherbrooke, Quebec, and Fort Smith, NWT.
***	Sable Is. and St-Paul Is. are assigned separate call sign prefixes by virtue of being directly under the authority of the federal government of Canada. They are respectively DXCC entities #211 & #252. St.-Paul Is. used to be covered by the VY9 prefix and Sable Is. used to use VX9 (which is now used by experimental stations).
	Note: calls issued do not reflect the actual number of amateurs in a call area – some amateur operators have more than one call sign, and due to lag in reporting changes some might currently be issued to an operator living in another call sign area

=== Special event call signs ===
Innovation, Science and Economic Development Canada reserves the right to issue temporary special event call signs to licensed amateurs using the other available prefixes.

Typically, for national or regional observances licensed amateurs add their suffix to the assigned special event prefix as per the following explanation. An individual amateur may apply for a single special event callsign that has any of the 24 prefixes and an appropriate suffix related to the event. For instance, VA3OR received the special event call CF3NAVY from June 4 to July 3, 2010 to commemorate the 100th Anniversary of the Royal Canadian Navy. In 1973 for the centennial of the RCMP a call sign VE3RCMP was issued and used from N division in Ottawa from April to November. The operators were all members of the RCMP who were also amateur radio operators.

For the special national event commemorating the 2010 Vancouver Olympics, from February 1, to March 31, 2010 amateurs could substitute VG for VA, VX for VE, XJ for VO, XK for VY so that an amateur with call sign VE3AAA could use VX3AAA, or VY0AAA could use XK0AAA.

For the 2023 Coronation of King Charles III, special call signs were authorized for use from May 5 to July 2, 2023.

==== Call Signs with more than one numeral ====
Some special event call signs have been issued with more than one numeral. For instance, VE2008VQ was issued for the 400th anniversary of the founding of Québec City from June 28 to July 27, 2008. Also, CG200I was issued for the 200th Anniversary of the Lighthouse of L'Ile Verte (Green Island), Québec.

Technically speaking, the first digit is the numeral separating prefix from the suffix, and the rest are part of the suffix.

=== Automobile licence plates for amateur operators ===
Canadian provincial and territorial motor vehicle licensing authorities can issue special licence plates to amateurs resident in their jurisdiction. In British Columbia, the ICBC application form clearly allows only call signs beginning with VE7 or VA7, but calls from other jurisdictions are allowed in some cases.

=== Reciprocal agreement with the United States ===
Under a reciprocal agreement between the United States and Canada, United States citizens licensed by the FCC can use their call sign within Canada as long as they affix the appropriate Canadian area-prefix to the end of their American call sign. For instance, a United States amateur with call sign W6AAA operating in British Columbia would sign as W6AAA/VE7 (Similarly, Canadians in the United States would affix the appropriate American area-prefix to the end of their call sign, such as VE7AAA/W6).

== Other services ==
There are many other radio services besides broadcasting and amateur radio. Call signs for all of these utilize the ITU-assigned prefix blocks shown in the table above. Only some services are detailed here.

Canadian civil aircraft display five-character registration letters that also function as radio call signs. The Canadian government could use any of the ITU blocks assigned but historically only CF, CG and CI have been used. In the past only CF was used and shown on aircraft as CF-AAA (where the A can be any letter). Eventually the CG block was added, and most aircraft registered since that time display the registration as either C-FAAA or C-GAAA. Ultralight aircraft are assigned registrations commencing with CI, in the format C-IAAA. Previously, when hovercraft were first introduced to Canada, they were registered as aircraft, and received CH registrations. For example the first hovercraft operated by the Canadian Coast Guard had the registration CH-CCG. Eventually hovercraft became registered as vessels instead of as aircraft and the CH-AAA format was abandoned. In the post-war era of the fifties and sixties, Canadian military aircraft also utilized such five letter call signs; however these commenced with blocks in the V series such as VC and VD.

Official ground stations in the aeronautical services, particularly federal Department of Transport air traffic control and advisory stations were traditionally given call signs commencing with VF followed by another letter and one or two numerals. Commonly the third letter corresponded to the location. For example the station in Calgary has the call sign VFC2. In recent years newly-established stations in this category, now operated by Nav Canada, have been given call signs similar to land stations in general, i.e. three letters and three numerals. For example one of the transmitters at Halifax International Airport, operated by Nav Canada, has the call sign VON855. For such land stations there is no confinement to Newfoundland and Labrador of the VO prefix.

Canadian ships are allocated a variety of call sign types. In the post-war era the predominant type consisted of four letters, similar in format to broadcasting stations except that they commenced with CY (part of block), VB, VC, VD or VG for commercial and private vessels, and CG for federal government vessels (civil and military) and CY (part of block) and CZ for naval vessels only. Naval examples from the past include CYRO (HMCS Yukon) and CZDE (HMCS Restigouche). Most or all new naval vessels are receiving CG call signs, most of which have been recycled. An example of a modern naval call sign is CGAP (HMCS Halifax). Beginning in the 1960s or earlier, civil vessel call signs also began to be issued in the format of two letters followed by four numerals and even later by three letters and four numerals. A modern example is the tug Atlantic Elm with VC9942 and its sister receiving CFH8951. Currently it is unclear why some civilian vessels receive four-letter call signs and others receive the letter-number combination type.. In more recent years other blocks from the Canadian allocation have been assigned to civilian vessels. For example, VABK is the call sign for the tanker Algoberta.

Canadian government coast stations operating in the maritime service are given three-letter call signs commencing with VA, VB or VC. Examples are VAE in Tofino, BC and VCH in Halifax, both operated by the Canadian Coast Guard. Major military land stations are given similar three-letter call signs but with other two-letter prefixes. Examples are the naval stations CFH in Newport Corner, NS and CKN in Aldergrove, BC.

Prior to the shutdown of Weatheradio Canada in 2026, those stations had call signs of three letters and three numbers, issued from various "C", "V" or "X" Canadian prefix series. Examples included CGZ555 in Vancouver, VAZ533 in Windsor and XLM300 in Montreal. Remaining Canadian Coast Guard continuous marine broadcasts on the allocated weather frequencies in British Columbia by and large also use these same alphanumeric sequences.

Experimental television stations in Canada had call signs beginning with "VX9".

== History of call sign allocation ==
=== Before 1913 ===
Prior to adoption of the Radiotelegraphic Act on June 6, 1913, in most cases radio station owners adopted call letters of their own choosing. By 1912 most Marconi Company-owned commercial stations, including those in Canada, had three-letter call signs starting with "M", while other stations commonly were given calls that reflected a station's location or its owner's initials. One exception was the amateur radio operators belonging to The Wireless Association of Ontario, who were assigned three-letter call signs by the club that began with the letter "X", followed by the first letter of the member's surname, and closing with a sequentially assigned third letter.

=== 1913 ===
In 1912 the first International Radiotelegraph Convention was held in London. This conference established an International Bureau in Berne, Switzerland, which allocated initial letters for call signs issued to stations within various jurisdictions, and in the Bureau's April 23, 1913 circular "Canada (British)" was assigned VAA–VGZ. (The series VOA–VOZ was assigned to "Newfoundland (British)".) These allocations only covered commercial stations, and a broadcasting station category did not yet exist.

Amateur and experimental stations were not yet included in the international assignments. For these stations, the federal government assigned three-letter call signs, starting with "XAA", that were issued in alphabetical order. Experimental stations later received call letters from a separate alphabetical sequence, starting with XWA in Montreal.

=== Post World War I ===
Most civilian radio stations were shut down by the federal government during World War I. After the war, the call letters in the range CFA–CKZ were assigned to "British Colonies and Protectorates", and in 1920 this assignment was divided between Canada, which received "CF", "CH", "CJ" and "CK", Australia, which was assigned "CG", and Newfoundland, which was given "CI".

Canada silenced its amateur stations from August 1914 to May 1, 1919. Concurrent with the restoration of amateur station licensing, there was a change to alphanumeric call signs, consisting of a regional number from 1 to 5, followed by two letters. Training Schools followed a similar policy, with an initial digit of 6, with Experimental stations call signs now starting with the digit 9.

1919 Prefixes	Province/Territory
1	Nova Scotia, New Brunswick and Prince Edward Island
2	Quebec
3	Ontario
4	Alberta, Saskatchewan and Manitoba
5	British Columbia, North West Territories and Yukon Territory
6	Training Schools
9	Experimental

As international communication became more frequent, Canadian amateurs informally began using a prefix of 'C' in front of their assigned alphanumeric call sign, and Americans similarly used a 'U' as a prefix. On February 1, 1927, European countries began using a two-letter prefix beginning with 'E' in front of their regional identifying numbers. Following that practise North American operators put a leading "N" in front of their calls, so that Canada's prefix became "NC" and Americans used "NU". For example a British Columbia amateur would sign their transmissions with a prefix of NC5.

=== 1922 ===
Radio broadcasting began to appear in the early 1920s. Initially there was not a separate category for stations making broadcasts intended for the general public, so the earliest broadcasts were sent by stations operating under standard amateur and experimental licences. In early 1922 two new licence categories were added: "Private Commercial Broadcasting station" and "Amateur Broadcasting station". In late April 1922 an initial group of twenty-three commercial broadcasting station licenses was announced, which received four-letter call signs starting with "CF", "CH", "CJ" or "CK", plus one additional "C" as the third or fourth letter. Stations in the Amateur Broadcasting station category received alphanumeric call signs starting with the number "10".

Canada has traditionally made use of a few call letter prefixes outside of those assigned to the country. In the 1920s exceptions were made for three regular Canadian National Railways broadcasting stations, CNRA in Moncton, CNRV in Vancouver and CNRO in Ottawa, plus the railway's "phantom stations" operating on time leased from other stations. When the Canadian Radio Broadcasting Commission took over the Canadian National Railway stations in 1932 and began to buy other stations, the prefix "CRC" was reserved for its exclusive use, including CRCT (formerly CKGW) and CRCY (formerly CKNC) in Toronto. In 1936 the Canadian Broadcasting Corporation succeeded the Canadian Radio Broadcasting Commission. Its stations were assigned call letters starting with "CB", and in Toronto CRCT became CBL and CRCY became CBY. In the early 1930s the Canadian Pacific Railway held a phantom station licence for Toronto, which held the call letters CPRY.

=== 1929 ===
At the International Radiotelegraph Convention (Washington, 1927) Canada was assigned the call letters blocks CFA–CKZ and VAA–VGZ. These came into force January 1, 1929, and amateur radio stations were now included in the ITU lettering scheme. Initially all amateur radio stations were given the prefix "VE" which replaced informal use of "NC", a prefix in use by the United States Navy.

=== 1946–1949 ===
Following World War II, the International Telecommunication Convention (Atlantic City, 1947) met and refined the international call sign blocks. Canada was assigned CFA–CKZ, CYA–CZZ, VAA–VGZ, VXA–VYZ, XJA–XOZ and 3BA–3FZ. These came into force January 1, 1949. The 3BA–3FZ block eventually was reallocated between Mauritius, Equatorial Guinea, Kingdom of Swaziland, Fiji, and Panama.

The Canadian government reformatted amateur call signs according to this table.

1946 Prefixes	Province/Territory
VE1	Nova Scotia, New Brunswick and Prince Edward Island
VE2	Quebec
VE3	Ontario
VE4	Manitoba
VE5	Saskatchewan
VE6	Alberta
VE7	British Columbia
VE8	Yukon and Northwest Territories
VE9	Experimental, transferred to NB in 1994

=== 1949–1999 ===
In 1949 Newfoundland and Labrador joined with Canada and the VOA–VOZ block of prefixes came with them. In 1954 the federal government made VE0 available to Canadian operators in international waters. The additions to the 1946 prefixes are summarized as:

Date	Prefix(es)	Province/Territory	Comment
1949	VO1	Newfoundland	Newfoundland entered Confederation
1949	VO2	Labrador	entered Confederation with Newfoundland
1954	VE0	International Waters	for Canadian operators at sea
1977	VY1	Yukon	Northwest Territories retained VE8
1990	VY2	Prince Edward Island	Nova Scotia retained VE1
1994	VE9	New Brunswick	Experimental prefix transferred to NB, NS retained VE1
1990s	VY9, VX9	Government of Canada	Reserved for Government of Canada operators and St.-Paul Is.; Sable Is. assigned VX9
1990s	CY0, CY9	Sable Is., St.-Paul Is.	Now considered separate DXCC entities (#211 & #252) so assigned unique prefixes, VX9 given to experimental stations
1995	VA3	Ontario	VA3 prefix adopted to increase number of available call signs
1999	VY0	Nunavut	Nunavut recognized as a territory on April 1, NWT retains VE8
1999	VA	NS, QC, MB, SK, AB, BC	VA1, VA2, VA4, VA5, VA6, VA7 prefixes adopted

== See also ==
- List of television stations in Canada by call sign
- Amateur radio international operation
- Radio Amateurs of Canada
- ITU prefix – amateur and experimental stations
- Amateur radio license
