= K-Rock (radio) =

Radio station brand

K-Rock is a common radio brand, generally carried by radio stations airing a modern rock format. The brand is currently owned by Audacy, Inc. which acquired it as part of the merger with CBS Radio which owned the K-Rock brand in the United States since 1986. Then known as Infinity Broadcasting, CBS acquired the K-Rock brand after purchasing noted Los Angeles rock station KROQ-FM, its callsign the origin of the "K-Rock" name. In Canada, the K-Rock trademark is held by Rogers Media, owner of CIKR-FM ("K-Rock 105.7") in Kingston, Ontario. Most other K-Rock stations in Canada are owned by the Stingray Digital Group.

UNITED STATES
Callsign	Branding	Frequency	Location	Owner	Years active
KROQ-FM	106.7 KROQ	106.7 FM	Los Angeles, California	Audacy	1973–present
WXRK	92.3 K-Rock	92.3 FM	New York, New York	Audacy	1985–2005, 2007–09
WKRK-FM	97.1 K-Rock	97.1 FM	Detroit, Michigan	Audacy	1997–99
WKRK-FM	92.3 K-Rock	92.3 FM	Cleveland, Ohio	Audacy	2006–08
WRKZ	93.7 K-Rock	93.7 FM	Pittsburgh, Pennsylvania	Audacy	2004–07
WKLL	94.9 K-Rock	94.9 FM	Utica, New York	Galaxy Communications	
WKRL	100.9 K-Rock	100.9 FM	Syracuse, New York	Galaxy Communications	
WKRH	106.5 K-Rock	106.5 FM	Oswego-Auburn, New York	Galaxy Communications	
WRXK-FM	96 K-Rock	96.1 FM	Fort Myers, Florida	Beasley Broadcast Group	
WKKN	K-Rock 101.9	101.9 FM	Keene, New Hampshire	Great Eastern Radio	2008–12
KORL-HD2	K-Rock 101.5	101.5 FM	Honolulu, Hawaii	HHawaii Media	
KRKH	K-Rock 97.3	101.9 FM	Maui, Hawaii	HHawaii Media	
KMKF	101.5 K-Rock	101.5 FM	Manhattan, Kansas	Manhattan Broadcasting Company	
CANADA
Callsign	Name	Frequency	Location	Owner	Years active
CIKR-FM	K-Rock 105.7	105.7 FM	Kingston, Ontario	Rogers Radio	2008–present
CIRK-FM	K-97	97.3 FM	Edmonton, Alberta	Newcap Broadcasting	1997–2008
CHFT-FM	100.5 K-Rock	100.5 FM	Fort McMurray, Alberta	Newcap Broadcasting	2008–2013
CJXK-FM	95.3 K-Rock	95.3 FM	Cold Lake, Alberta	Newcap Broadcasting	2004–2017
CKKY-FM	K-Rock 101.9	101.9 FM	Wainwright, Alberta	Newcap Broadcasting	2013–2017
CKQK-FM	K-Rock 105.5	105.5 FM	Charlottetown, Prince Edward Island	Newcap Broadcasting	2006–2012
CIJK-FM	K-Rock 89.3	89.3 FM	Kentville, Nova Scotia	Stingray Digital Group	2008–2021
VOCM-FM	97.5 K-Rock	97.5 FM	St. John's, Newfoundland	Stingray Digital Group	2002–present
CKXD-FM	98.7 K-ROCK	98.7 FM	Gander, Newfoundland	Stingray Digital Group	Early 2000s–present
CKXG-FM	102.3 K-ROCK	102.3 FM	Grand Falls-Windsor, Newfoundland	Stingray Digital Group	Early 2000s–present
CKXX-FM	103.9 K-Rock	103.9 FM	Corner Brook, Newfoundland	Stingray Digital Group	Early 2000s–present
CHNK-FM	K-Rock 100.7	100.7 FM	Winnipeg, Manitoba	Newcap Broadcasting	2010–2011
AUSTRALIA
Callsign	Name	Frequency	Location	Owner	Years active
3CAT-FM	95.5 K-Rock	95.5 FM	Geelong, Victoria	Grant Broadcasters	

== See also ==
- K-Rockathon
- K-Rock Centre
