= VOCM =

VOCM may refer to:

- VOCM (AM), a news and talk radio station (590 AM) licensed to St. John's, Newfoundland and Labrador, Canada
- VOCM-FM, a classic rock radio station (97.5 FM) licensed to St. John's, Newfoundland and Labrador, Canada
