= CKVB-FM =

Radio station in Corner Brook, Canada

Coordinates: 48°56′59″N 57°56′44″W

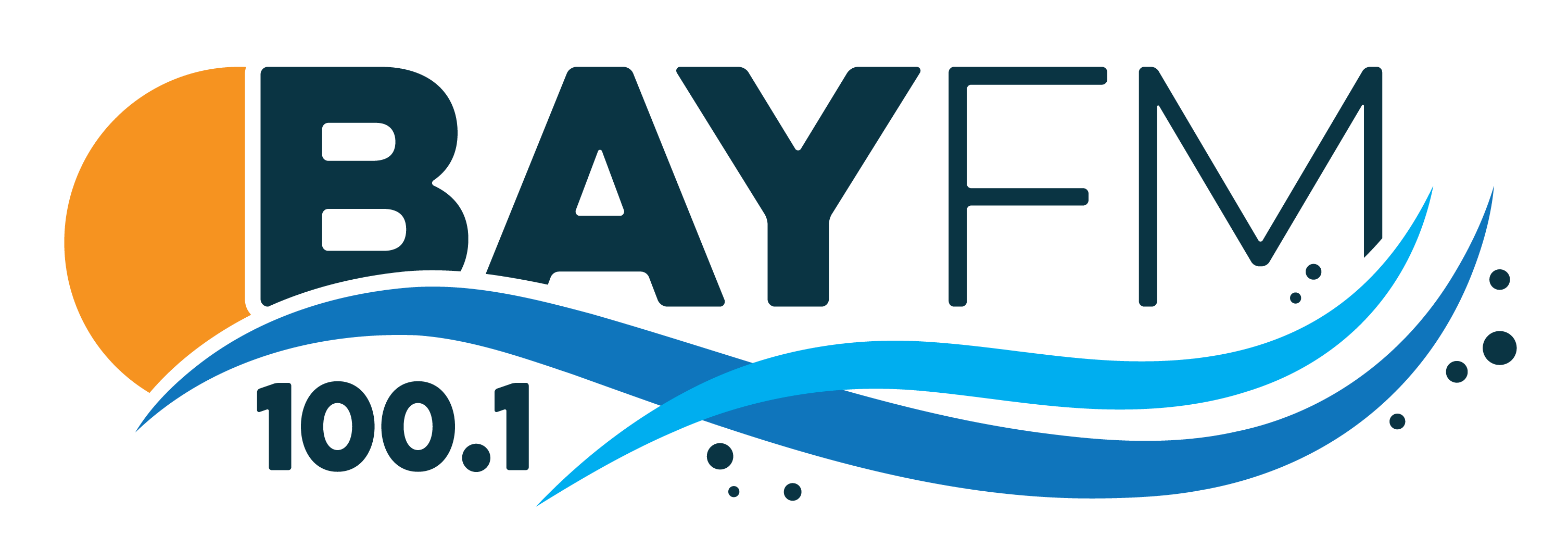
- Corner Brook, Newfoundland and Labrador; Canada
- Broadcast area: Western Newfoundland
- Frequency: 100.1 MHz
- Branding: 100.1 BayFM

Programming
- Format: Country/Community radio

Ownership
- Owner: Bay of Islands Radio Inc.

History
- First air date: November 5, 2017
- Former names: Bay of Islands Radio
- Call sign meaning: Voice of the Bay of Islands

Technical information
- Class: A
- ERP: vertical polarization only: 2.76 kilowatts
- HAAT: 14.6 metres (48 ft)

Links
- Webcast: Listen Live
- Website: bayfm.ca

CKVB-FM (100.1 BayFM) is a Canadian radio station. The station broadcasts a Country/community radio format on 100.1 FM in Corner Brook, Newfoundland and Labrador.

Until June 2023, the station was branded as Bay of Islands Radio (BOIR).

== History ==
Since 2011, CKVB has maintained a full-time internet stream, broadcasting programs from a wide variety of topics and music genres produced by its volunteers. The station also broadcasts many local events that are of interest to the public, such as the bi-weekly live broadcast of Corner Brook City Council. The station is registered as a non-profit organization, and was operated entirely by volunteers from the surrounding communities of the Bay of Islands until 2023.

The station was founded in partnership with the Grenfell Campus Student Union (GCSU) and College of the North Atlantic, and was operated on the premises of Memorial University's Grenfell Campus until January 2015; it moved to a new facility on Brook Street at this time, which was donated by the City of Corner Brook.

On February 12, 2016, the station submitted an application to the CRTC for a license to operate a low power FM community radio station. The license approval was issued on October 6, 2016.

On November 5, 2017, the station launched its new broadcast signal on 100.1 FM in the Corner Brook area with transmitter located in the Humber Heights area of Corner Brook. The new signal reached as far as McIvers and Frenchman's Cove to the west, Little Rapids to the east, and Logger's School Road to the south.

On October 17, 2022, Corner Brook City Council approved the sale of a piece of land off Mayfair Avenue to BayFM for the purpose of constructing a new transmitter site, citing coverage issues at its current site. The land was sold to the station at a cost of $1.00. The location of the land is adjacent to the former transmitter site of CHOZ-FM and CJON-DT's Corner Brook repeaters, until the tower was dismantled in 2014 following the closure of NTV's analogue television network.

In April 2023, the station announced it would be expanding its programming and hiring several announcers who lost their jobs as part of Stingray Radio's station closures across Newfoundland and Labrador in March 2022, including two stations in Corner Brook. Longtime morning personality Lenny Benoit, formerly with CFCB, joined as the station's new manager while Dean Clarke, formerly with Stingray's CKGA Gander, began as a full-time announcer. BayFM continues to incorporate a variety of volunteer programming into its programming schedule outside regular business hours.

With the closure of Corner Brook's only two private radio stations, CFCB and CKXX-FM, in March 2022, CKVB remains as the only locally programmed radio station in the region.

As part of a relaunch of the radio station, on 8:00 a.m. on June 19, 2023, CKVB became 100.1 BayFM. On the same date, the station also announced it had moved to a new facility in the Glynmill Inn, which was formerly occupied by Stingray Radio.

100.1 BayFM was awarded Best Community or Campus Radio Station in a small market at the 2023 and 2024 Canadian Radio Awards. The station was also the recipient of the Community Engagement Award at the 2024 National Campus and Community Radio Association's CRABO awards and the Community Investment Award at the 2024 Greater Corner Brook Board of Trade Excellence Awards.

On July 2, 2024, Bay of Islands Radio Inc. submitted an application to operate an English-language community FM radio station in Corner Brook to replace its low-power station CKVB-FM to a full-power FM station which would operate at 100.1 MHz (channel 261A) with an effective radiated power (ERP) of 2760 watts (non-directional antenna with an effective height of antenna above average terrain [EHAAT] of 14.6 metres). This application was approved on December 20, 2024 and on-air testing commenced on January 9, 2025. The new signal improves reception within the Corner Brook area and also extends coverage into the Humber Valley to Deer Lake. Cabin areas west of Corner Brook such as Pinchgut Lake and George's Lake are also now within listening range.
