= CJON =

CJON may refer to:

- CJON-DT, a television station (channel 21) licensed to St. John's, Newfoundland and Labrador, Canada
- CJYQ, a radio station (930 AM) licensed to St. John's, Newfoundland and Labrador, Canada, which held the call sign CJON from 1950 to 1977
