= CHOZ-FM =

Radio station in St. John's, Newfoundland and Labrador

- St. John's, Newfoundland and Labrador; Canada
- Broadcast area: Newfoundland
- Frequency: 94.7 MHz
- Branding: OZ FM

Programming
- Format: Mainstream rock

Ownership
- Owner: Stirling Communications International; (Newfoundland Broadcasting Company, Ltd.)
- Sister stations: CJON-DT

History
- First air date: June 15, 1977
- Former frequencies: 93.9 MHz (1977–1984)

Technical information
- Class: C
- ERP: 100,000 watts
- HAAT: 226 metres (741 ft)
- Transmitter coordinates: 47°31′31.7″N 52°42′47.7″W
- Repeater: see main article

Links
- Webcast: Listen Live
- Website: ozfm.com

CHOZ-FM (94.7 FM, "OZ FM") is a radio station in St. John's, Newfoundland and Labrador. Owned by Stirling Communications, it broadcasts a mainstream rock format.

Its main St. John's transmitter broadcasts at 94.7 MHz, with additional transmitters located throughout the island. The station is one of the various media properties of the Stirling family; this includes local television station CJON-DT.

CHOZ is simulcast across Canada on Bell Satellite TV channel 951, and in the St. John's area on subchannel 21.2 of CJON-DT.

== History ==
CHOZ launched on June 15, 1977 on 93.9 FM, soon after Geoff Stirling sold his interest in what is now CJYQ. It was originally a full-time rock station known as The New Radio OZ, The Rock Of The Rock!. It eventually transitioned into a CHR/Classic Rock hybrid format under the OZ FM brand; nonetheless, it kept The Rock Of The Rock! slogan.

Logo used from 2007 to 2009

On August 1, 1984, CHOZ was approved to move to 94.7 FM.

Logo used from 2009 to 2012

The station's success was driven largely by the strength of its morning show, The Dawn Patrol, hosted by Randy Snow, Deborah Birmingham and Larry Jay.

On January 2, 2012, CHOZ's website consisted of this lone image. It depicted the current logo in the foreground, with the one used from 2009 to 2012 in the background

In the summer of 2003, Snow left the Dawn Patrol to join CKIX-FM to host his own morning show. His replacement was Brian O'Connell, who left VOCM to join CHOZ.

By 2004, CHOZ began shifting towards hot adult contemporary, with slogans like "More Music, More Variety" and "Newfoundland's #1 FM Station".

In April 2007, O'Connell took over as station manager for the OZ FM Network and host of the daily Electric Lunch program. Then, O'Connell left CHOZ and now works with Stingray Radio. Paul Kinsman was O'Connell's on air replacement, joining longtime Dawn Patrol veterans Birmingham and Jay.

On August 17, 2009, CHOZ changed its format to active rock.

On January 2, 2012, CHOZ flipped back to hot AC, with a new slogan "Today's Best Music". This ended the use of their longtime slogan "The Rock of the Rock". The station also resurrected their longtime heart and rainbow logo that was used from the late 1980s to 2007. The following month, the station surfaced on the Mediabase Canadian hot AC panel.

In August 2012, Kinsman and Jay left the Dawn Patrol, which was renamed The Morning Rush and featured a new host, Robert Shawn, alongside the only remaining original host Birmingham. In January 2013, the pair were joined by their former behind the scenes producer, Laura Woodworth. Birmingham left the station in January 2014 and her replacement on the Morning Rush was Stephanie O'Brien, previously with VOCM-FM. Woodworth left the station in November 2014.

In July 2015, Shawn switched shifts with afternoon/evening host Stephen Lethbridge. The Morning Rush was then renamed The OZ FM Rush. In December of the same year, Weekend announcer Hugh Campbell joined the Rush. In December 2016, O'Brien went on maternity leave. Shannell Lewis co-hosted the Rush until O'Brien's return in February 2018.

On August 26, 2019, Snow returned to CHOZ after 16 years with CKIX-FM. As a result, the OZ FM Rush became The Morning Jam with Snow joining O'Brien as the new host, replacing Lethbridge and Campbell. In addition, CHOZ tweaked its format to playing a mix of hits from the 1990s to today, much like many other hot AC stations. The station previously had a top 40-leaning playlist. CHOZ became known as Newfoundland’s Music Mix, The New OZ FM.

In May 2020, the station started to drop the "new" from their moniker. By August 2020, the "new" was removed completely.

On September 1, 2023, CHOZ parted ways with Snow and O'Brien. The Morning Jam relaunched as OZ Mornings with former morning co-hosts Lethbridge and Campbell. The station shifted back to its former CHR/Classic Rock format and signature slogan "The Rock of the Rock". In October 2023, CJON reporter Marykate O'Neill joined OZ Mornings. At the end of July 2024, Lewis returned to the morning show with O'Neill becoming the stations newsreader.

In 2025, Lethbridge left OZ Mornings and switched to evenings. The station also shifted to a rock-leaning adult hits format, removing most of the modern pop music from its playlist.

In 2026, Lewis left the station and was replaced by Lauren Davis. OZ Mornings rebranded as The Morning Light.

== Controversy ==
In January 2011, the Canadian Broadcast Standards Council admonished CHOZ for playing the unedited version of Dire Straits' "Money for Nothing", following a complaint from a listener that stated that the song contained the word "faggot", a slur for a homosexual person. Even though the song has won numerous awards and has been played countless times on Canadian radio, the CBSC felt that the unedited version has become unacceptable for airplay, as the term "faggot", which was once an acceptable term, has since become an unacceptable slur. In response to the ruling, at least two stations, CIRK-FM in Edmonton, Alberta and CFRQ-FM in Halifax, Nova Scotia, played the unedited version of Money for Nothing repeatedly for one hour out of protest. On January 21, 2011, the CRTC asked the CBSC for a review on the ban, in response to the public outcry against the CBSC's actions; the regulator requested the CBSC to appoint a nationwide panel to review the case, as the decision on the ban was reviewed by a regional panel for the Maritimes and Newfoundland.

On August 31, the CBSC found the slur to be inappropriate; however, due to considerations in regard to its use in context, the CBSC has left it up to the stations to decide whether or not to censor the song. Most of the CBSC panelists thought the slur was inappropriate, but it was used only in a satirical, non-hateful manner.

== Transmitters ==
Rebroadcasters of CHOZ-FM
City of licence	Identifier	Frequency	Power	Class	RECNet	CRTC Decision	Notes
Argentia	CFOZ-FM	100.3 FM	3,650 watts	B	Query		
Clarenville	CJMY-FM	105.3 FM	4,700 watts	B1	Query	CRTC 87-702	
Corner Brook	CKOZ-FM	92.3 FM	7,660 watts	B1	Query		
Grand Falls-Windsor	CKMY-FM	95.9 FM	46,600 watts	C1	Query		Also serves the Gander area
Stephenville	CIOS-FM	98.5 FM	3,030 watts	A	Query		

CJMY and CKMY were previously known as CKCV-FM and CHOS-FM respectively, up to at least 2002. The changes were apparently made to reserve appropriate call signs for My FM, Newfoundland Broadcasting's proposal for a second FM service, which went before the CRTC later that same year. The licence in question eventually went to a different company as CKSJ-FM.

In 1997, CHOZ added a rebroadcaster at Stockholm, Saskatchewan with the callsign CFZY-FM; the low-powered repeater is locally owned by Jody Herperger. The station was decommissioned in 2007.

In 1998, CHOZ added a rebroadcaster at Kuujjuaq, Quebec on 98.3 with the callsign VF2321, owned by Société Kuujjuamiut.

On November 30, 2012, the stations rebroadcaster at Red Rocks, CKSS-FM 96.9 had closed. This transmitter served the Port aux Basques area. The station has cited the age of the tower and the costs of the upkeep. CHOZ, however, announced plans to reactivate it from another location, pending approval from the CRTC. As of 2018, CRTC approval has never been granted. CHOZ also originally planned to also temporarily close CIOS on the same day, but had second thoughts in doing so, and opted to keep it open from the same location instead. The application to move the CIOS transmitter to a new location has been approved on November 8, 2013.

On September 15, 2015, the CRTC approved a new transmitter for a new CHOZ rebroadcaster in Gander, CFAZ-FM 97.7, with an effective radiated power (ERP) of 2,800 watts (effective height of antenna above average terrain of 137.4 metres). The new transmitter would resolve coverage problems within the Gander area from its Grand Falls-Windsor outlet CKMY, which offered fringe reception in Gander. CFAZ began broadcasting on August 9, 2016.

On December 5, 2023, the CRTC approved an application by Newfoundland Broadcasting Company Ltd, to delete the rebroadcasting transmitters CIOZ-FM 96.3 Marystown, CJOZ-FM 92.1 Bonavista and CFAZ-FM 97.7 Gander from the licence. CJOZ went off the air on January 2, 2024 at noon. CFAZ shut down as of May 1, 2024. CIOZ left the air as of July 8, 2024.
