= K-Rock =

K-Rock may refer to:

== Arts, entertainment, and media ==
- Korean rock, rock music from Korea

=== Musicians/bands ===
- K-Rock, an American rapper from Memphis, Tennessee who has worked with artist like Tommy Wright III and the American rap group Three 6 Mafia.

=== Radio ===
- K-Rock (radio), a common brand of radio stations

== Sports facilitates ==
- Rogers K-Rock Centre, a sports and entertainment venue in Kingston, Ontario, Canada
