= Munsu =

Munsu may refer to:

- Park Mun-su, a Korean scholar
- Munsu (Blade of the Phantom Master), a comics character
- Munsu Cup Stadium, in South Korea
- Memorial University of Newfoundland Students' Union, a Canadian undergraduate student union
