= CKUJ-FM =

Radio station in Kuujjuaq, Quebec

Coordinates: 58°06′35″N 68°24′43″W

- Kuujjuaq, Quebec; Canada
- Frequency: 97.3 MHz

Ownership
- Owner: Société Kuujjuamiut

Technical information
- ERP: 394 watts average 2,997 watts peak
- HAAT: 18.5 metres (61 ft)

Links
- Website: www.kuujjuamiut.ca/radio

CKUJ-FM is a community radio station that broadcasts on the frequency of 97.3 FM in Kuujjuaq, Quebec, Canada.

Owned by Société Kuujjuamiut, it is unknown when the station was originally licensed, however, CKUJ-FM began broadcasting at 90.1 FM, until it moved to its current frequency approved in 1991.

Société Kuujjuamiut also owns and operates station VF2321, broadcasting at 98.3 FM; this station repeats CHOZ-FM of St. John's, Newfoundland and Labrador.
