= CKXD-FM =

Radio station in Gander, Newfoundland and Labrador

Coordinates: 48°57′45″N 54°40′33″W

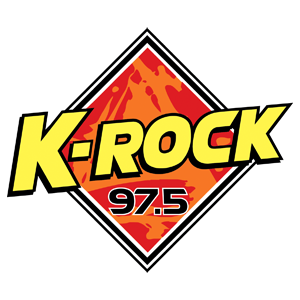
- Gander, Newfoundland and Labrador; Canada
- Broadcast area: Central Newfoundland
- Frequency: 98.7 MHz
- Branding: 97.5 K-Rock

Programming
- Format: Classic rock

Ownership
- Owner: Stingray Group
- Sister stations: CKGA

History
- First air date: February 1974
- Former call signs: CJCR (1974–1977); CFYQ (1978–1990); CKXD (1990–1999)
- Former frequencies: 1350 kHz (AM) (1974–1990); 1010 kHz (1990–1999)
- Call sign meaning: Kixx Gander

Links
- Webcast: Listen Live
- Website: 987krock.com

CKXD-FM (98.7 FM) is a Canadian radio station broadcasting from Gander, Newfoundland and Labrador, at 98.7 MHz with a classic rock format branded on-air as 97.5 K-Rock.

== History ==
The station launched between 1973 and 1974 as CJCR at 1350 kHz, and is currently owned by Stingray Group. In 1977, after Don Jamieson bought out Geoff Stirling's interest in Radio CJYQ-930 Ltd., CJCR was renamed CFYQ. In 1983, Jamieson sold his company to CHUM Limited. In 1989, CHUM Limited sold the "Q" stations to Newcap. By 1990, CFYQ had changed frequencies to 1010. In 1990, CFYQ's program feed changed from CJYQ to CKIX-FM and changed its callsign again to CKXD. In 1999, with the AM equipment nearing the end of its life cycle, CKXD officially made its move to 98.7 FM. In the early 2000s, CKXD re-branded from KIXX Country to Magic 98 with a hot adult contemporary format, and shortly afterwards to 98.7 K-Rock with a classic rock format. The other two "KIXX" stations outside of St. John's, CKXG-FM in Grand Falls-Windsor and CKXX-FM in Corner Brook, were also branded with the "Magic" name and then subsequently to "K-Rock".

As of March 9, 2022, CKXD no longer originates any local programming from Gander following the closure of its studios and termination of on-air personnel by Stingray. All content of this station is now simulcast from VOCM-FM in St. John's, with the exception of local commercials. CKXD's sister station, CKGA, also shared the same fate as it shared studio facilities and personalities.

== Rebroadcasters ==
CKXD had a rebroadcaster on 670 kHz in Musgravetown (CKXB, originally CJNW in 1975 then CHYQ in 1977) serving Clarenville and the Bonavista Peninsula, but because of problems with the aging transmission equipment that resulted in many breakdowns, the transmitter was shut down in 2003. The Clarenville area is now served by VOCM-FM in St. John's using a repeater (VOCM-FM-1) on 100.7 MHz.
