= CKXG-FM =

Radio station in Grand Falls-Windsor, Newfoundland and Labrador

Coordinates: 48°56′40″N 55°38′27″W

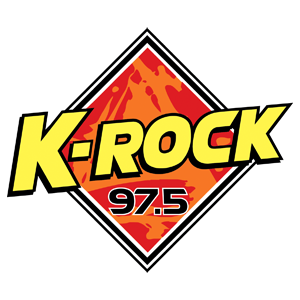
- Grand Falls-Windsor, Newfoundland and Labrador; Canada
- Broadcast area: Central Newfoundland
- Frequency: 102.3 MHz
- Branding: 97.5 K-Rock

Programming
- Format: Classic rock

Ownership
- Owner: Stingray Group
- Sister stations: CKCM

History
- First air date: 1960s
- Former call signs: CJON-1 (1960s-1966); CJCN (1966–1977); CIYQ (1977–1990); CKXG (1990–1999)
- Former frequencies: 680 kHz (1960s-1999)
- Call sign meaning: Kixx Grand Falls-Windsor (former branding and broadcast area)

Technical information
- Class: B
- ERP: 17 kW average 36 kW peak
- HAAT: 96.6 metres (317 ft)

Links
- Webcast: Listen Live
- Website: krocknl.com

CKXG-FM (102.3 FM, 97.5 K-Rock) is a radio station in Grand Falls-Windsor, Newfoundland and Labrador. Owned by Stingray Group, it broadcasts a classic rock format, although some 1990s and 2000s rock songs have become part of the mix.

== History ==
The station launched in the 1960s as CJON-1 at 680 kHz.

In 1977, after Don Jamieson bought out Geoff Stirling's interest in Radio CJYQ-930 Ltd, CJCN was renamed CIYQ. In 1983, Jamieson sold his company to CHUM Limited. In 1989, CHUM Limited sold the "Q" stations to Newcap. In 1990, CIYQ's program feed changed from CJYQ to CKIX-FM and changed its call letters again to CKXG branded as KIXX Country. In 1999, with the AM equipment nearing the end of its life cycle, CKXG jumped to 102.3 FM. In the early 2000s, CKXG re-branded to Magic 102 with a hot adult contemporary format, and shortly afterwards to 102.3 K-Rock with a classic rock format. The other two "KIXX" stations outside of St. John's, CKXD-FM in Gander and CKXX-FM in Corner Brook, were also branded with the Magic name and then subsequently to K-Rock.

On September 29, 2011, Newcap received approval to decrease CKXG's average effective radiated power (ERP) from 24,000 to 17,000 watts, increasing the maximum ERP from 24,000 to 36,000 watts, decreasing the antenna's effective height above average terrain from 236.7 to 96.6 metres and relocating the antenna site.

As of March 9, 2022, CKXG no longer originates any local programming from Grand Falls-Windsor following the closure of its studios and termination of on-air personnel by Stingray. All content of this station is now simulcast from VOCM-FM in St. John's, with the exception of local commercials.

== Rebroadcasters ==
CKXG had a rebroadcaster in Robert's Arm at 92.7 MHz. There is now a rebroadcaster in Lewisporte (CKXG-FM-1, originally in Grand Falls-Windsor) at 101.3.
