= CHVO-FM =

Radio station in Carbonear, Newfoundland and Labrador

Coordinates: 47°43′13″N 53°12′50″W

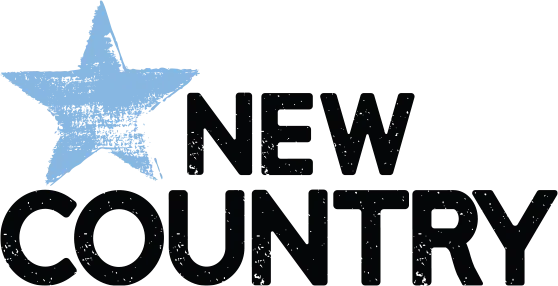
- Carbonear, Newfoundland and Labrador; Canada
- Broadcast area: Carbonear, Clarenville
- Frequency: 103.9 MHz
- Branding: New Country 103.9

Programming
- Format: Country
- Affiliations: Westwood One

Ownership
- Owner: Stingray Group

History
- First air date: October 1980
- Former frequencies: 850 kHz (1980–1990); 560 kHz (1990–2008)
- Call sign meaning: From VOCM, which it once rebroadcast

Technical information
- Class: B
- ERP: 17,000 watts

Links
- Website: newcountrynl.ca

CHVO-FM (103.9 MHz) is a Canadian radio station in Carbonear, Newfoundland and Labrador. Owned by Stingray Group, the station currently broadcasts a country format branded as New Country 103.9.

== History ==
CHVO first went on the air in 1980 as an AM affiliate of VOCM, although VOCM can be received in the Conception Bay North region without much difficulty, while the CHVO signal reaches parts of the St. John's area. Originally broadcasting at 850 AM, the station moved to 560 in 1990.

In August 2006, Newcap received CRTC approval to move CHVO to 103.9 FM. The application stated that CHVO would maintain its current country format. On July 4, 2007, CHVO was given approval by the CRTC to move to FM. On January 7 2008, CHVO-FM signed on the air as Kixx Country 103.9.

The relaunched CHVO is the first FM country station serving the Avalon Peninsula since sister station CKIX-FM in St. John's flipped to CHR/Top 40 in 2002. It no longer carries VOCM network programming. The station used to cover the St. John's area.

Previous logo

On April 30, 2021, CHVO rebranded as New Country 103.9 ending the "Kixx Country" branding after 13 years.

== Rebroadcasters ==
City of licence	Identifier	Frequency	Power	Class	Notes
Clarenville	CKLN-FM	97.1 FM	2,500 watts	A	Broadcasts different ads than Carbonear broadcast.

CHVO began test broadcasts on its new frequency, distinct from the broadcasts at 560 kHz, in late December 2007. The station's official launch was January 7, 2008. As per custom, the station was initially allowed to simulcast on AM until July 7 (six months after the launch). This was later extended until October due to technical issues with the FM signal which presently remain unresolved.

In 2016, the station added a rebroadcaster in Clarenville, operating on 97.1 FM with the call sign CKLN-FM. This transmitter airs some separate commercials targeted to the Clarenville area, but originates no programming independently of CHVO.
