= CKVO =

VOCM radio station in Clarenville, Newfoundland and Labrador, Canada

Coordinates: 48°8′36″N 53°57′40″W

- Clarenville, Newfoundland and Labrador; Canada
- Frequency: 710 kHz
- Branding: 590 VOCM

Programming
- Format: Full-service radio

Ownership
- Owner: Stingray Group

History
- First air date: 1975
- Call sign meaning: From VOCM

Technical information
- Class: B
- Power: 10,000 watts

Links
- Website: vocm.com

CKVO is an AM radio station in Clarenville, Newfoundland and Labrador, Canada, broadcasting on 710 kHz. Owned by Stingray Group, CKVO first went on the air in 1974. It is an affiliate of VOCM.

== History ==
Colonial Broadcasting System Ltd. was awarded a license in 1974 for a new AM station at Clarenville operating on 710 kHz with 10,000 watts day and night. In 1975, CKVO opened as a semi-satellite of VOCM in St. John's. Colonial filed an application for the establishment of studios at Clarenville, By 1995, CKVO was broadcasting 40 hours of local programming per week with the remainder of its schedule originating with VOCM. In 2000 Newcap Broadcasting Ltd. purchased CKVO and the other VOCM stations. On May 28, the CRTC renewed the licence of CKVO until August 31, 2016.

In September 2016, CKVO and CHCM in Marystown cancelled their remaining local programming and now simulcast VOCM in St. John's full-time.
