= CKCM =

Radio station in Grand Falls-Windsor, Newfoundland and Labrador

Coordinates: 48°56′39″N 55°38′31″W

- Grand Falls-Windsor, Newfoundland and Labrador; Canada
- Broadcast area: Central Newfoundland
- Frequency: 620 kHz
- Branding: 590 VOCM

Programming
- Format: Full-service radio

Ownership
- Owner: Stingray Group
- Sister stations: CKXG-FM

History
- First air date: July 25, 1962
- Call sign meaning: Variation of VOCM

Technical information
- Class: B
- Power: 10,000 watts

Links
- Website: vocm.com

CKCM is an AM radio station in Grand Falls-Windsor, Newfoundland and Labrador, Canada, broadcasting at 620 kHz. Owned by Stingray Group, CKCM first went on the air in 1962. It is an affiliate of VOCM. CKCM has a repeater in Baie Verte, CKIM 1240 kHz.

On July 20, 2010, CKCM applied for an FM repeater which will rebroadcast CKCM in Springdale with the callsign CKCM-1-FM. This application received CRTC approval to operate at 89.3 MHz on September 15, 2010.

In September 2016, CKCM cancelled their remaining local programming and now simulcast CKGA in Gander full-time.
