= CJBI-FM =

Community radio station in Bell Island, Newfoundland and Labrador

- Wabana, Bell Island, Newfoundland; Canada
- Frequency: 93.9 MHz
- Branding: Radio Bell Island

Programming
- Format: Community radio

History
- First air date: January 2013
- Call sign meaning: Bell Island

Technical information
- Class: C2
- ERP: 28 watts
- HAAT: 79.5 metres (261 ft)
- Transmitter coordinates: 47°38′03.8″N 52°58′01.9″W

Links
- Website: radiobellisland.ca

CJBI-FM, is a radio station broadcasting community radio at 93.9 FM in Wabana on Bell Island, Newfoundland and Labrador, Canada.

== History ==
Radio Bell Island began as a one-week special event broadcast license from March 14 to March 20, 2011, supported by the Rural Secretariat of the Government of Newfoundland and Labrador. During this week, Radio Bell Island operated on 100.1 FM. Radio Bell Island 100.1 FM was a partnership between the Town of Wabana, St. Michael's Regional High School, and the Rural Secretariat.

Radio Bell Island was approved for another one-week broadcasting license from March 19 to March 24, 2012, once again on 100.1 FM, and organized through partnership from the Town of Wabana, St. Michael's Regional High, and the Rural Secretariat. During the one-week broadcast of March 19 to 24, 2012, Peter Mansbridge, Chief Correspondent for CBC News and the anchor of The National, was interviewed on Radio Bell Island 100.1 FM by Donovan Taplin, local broadcaster and former Wabana municipal councillor.

On September 5, 2012, the Government of Newfoundland and Labrador provided Radio Bell Island Inc. with $15,000 in aid to assist in equipment and start-up costs to establish a permanent station.

Radio Bell Island is an incorporated entity governed by a volunteer Board of Directors. Radio Bell Island Inc. is a not-for-profit organization. John Moore is the current chairperson of the board of directors.

On November 5, 2012, Radio Bell Island Inc. received approval by the Canadian Radio-television and Telecommunications Commission (CRTC) to operate a new low power community FM radio station in Bell Island.
