= CHCM-FM =

VOCM radio station in Marystown, Newfoundland and Labrador, Canada

Coordinates: 47°08′41″N 55°16′18″W

- Marystown, Newfoundland and Labrador; Canada
- Broadcast area: Burin Peninsula
- Frequency: 88.3 MHz
- Branding: 590 VOCM

Programming
- Format: Full-service radio

Ownership
- Owner: Stingray Group

History
- First air date: May 23, 1962
- Former call signs: CHCM (1962–2021)
- Former frequencies: 560 kHz (1962–1990); 740 kHz (1990–2021)
- Call sign meaning: From VOCM

Technical information
- Class: B
- Power: 27,000 watts

Links
- Website: vocm.com

CHCM-FM is an FM radio station located in Marystown, Newfoundland and Labrador, Canada broadcasting at 88.3 MHz. Owned by Stingray Group, CHCM first went on the air on May 23, 1962. It is an affiliate of VOCM. CHCM was originally broadcast on 560 AM before moving to 740 in 1990.

In September 2016, CHCM and CKVO in Clarenville cancelled their remaining local programming; it now simulcasts VOCM programming from St. John's full-time.

On July 4, 2019, Stingray received CRTC approval to convert CHCM to 88.3 MHz with an effective radiated power of 59,300 watts (non-directional antenna with an effective height of the antenna above average terrain of 186.1 metres).
