= CHMR-FM =

Radio station at Memorial University of Newfoundland, Canada

- St. John's, Newfoundland and Labrador; Canada
- Frequency: 93.5 MHz
- Branding: 93.5 CHMR

Programming
- Format: Campus/community radio
- Affiliations: Pacifica Radio Network

Ownership
- Owner: Memorial University of Newfoundland Radio Society (Note: Although the MUN Radio Society is listed by the CRTC as the owner, a 2007 article in The Muse cast doubt on whether this organization continued to exist as a legal entity, as opposed to an unincorporated division of MUNSU.)

History
- Founded: 1951
- First air date: January 1987
- Call sign meaning: MUN Radio

Technical information
- Class: LP
- ERP: 50 watts
- HAAT: −3 metres (−9.8 ft)
- Transmitter coordinates: 47°34′24.9″N 52°43′57.8″W

Links
- Website: chmr.ca

CHMR-FM is a campus radio station broadcasting on the campus of Memorial University of Newfoundland in St. John's, Newfoundland and Labrador, Canada at 93.5 MHz, Rogers Cable channel 942 and Aliant TV channel 825.

The Memorial University of Newfoundland Radio Society received approval by the CRTC in 1986 to operate on 93.5 MHz. The 93.5 frequency launched in January 1987.

The station is operated by the university's undergraduate students' union, MUNSU. A media fee paid by all undergraduate students at Memorial's St. John's campus is the primary funding for CHMR. Along with The Muse, CHMR receives two dollars from every student each semester.

CHMR previously aired on cable radio at 103.7 MHz in the St. John's area. It moved to digital cable in late 2006, when Rogers discontinued all traditional cable FM service.

On April 1, 2026, the Memorial University Students' Union voted to eliminate its $300,000 a year of funding and support of CHMR and remove it as a student union service, effective August 31, 2026. The decision will result in the station losing between 60% and 70% of its funding. CHMR will continue to receive approximately $50,000 a year from a student levy.
