= Memorial University of Newfoundland Students' Union =

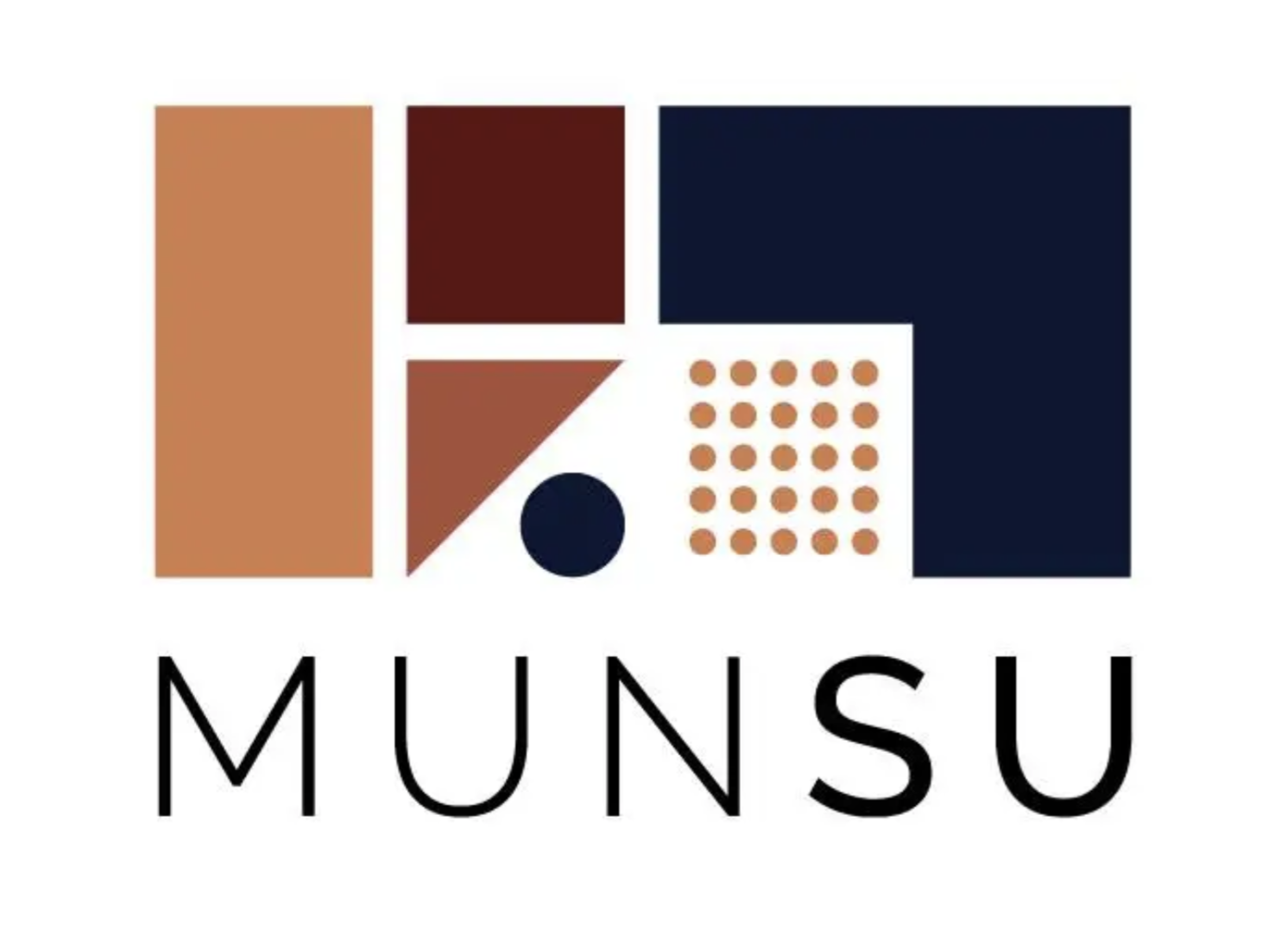
- Institution: Memorial University of Newfoundland
- Location: St. John's, Newfoundland and Labrador
- Established: 1961
- Members: ~11,500
- Affiliations: Canadian Federation of Students
- Website: www.munsu.ca

Memorial University of Newfoundland Students' Union, (popularly known as "MUNSU") is an undergraduate students' union located in St. John's, Newfoundland and Labrador, Canada. It is the official student government representing the students of Memorial University of Newfoundland, St. John's Campus. Membership in the union is automatic and totals around 11,500 undergraduate students. MUNSU is local 35 of the Canadian Federation of Students, one of the national organizations of student unions in Canada. MUNSU is one of very few students' unions in Canada to be directly recognized in provincial legislation as the official representatives of the student body (see: The Memorial University Act).

== Board of directors ==
The Students' Union Board of Directors is composed of 38 elected representatives including five Executive members, and faculty and constituency representatives. Elections for these positions are held annually in March. A by-election to fill vacant positions is normally held in the fall semester.

Executive Positions

- Director of External Affairs, Communications, and Research
- Director of Student Life
- Director of Finance & Services
- Director of Campaigns
- Director of Advocacy

In 2017-2018, a vote was taken to eliminate the five directors at large, in favour of five new constituency representatives. The 2017-2018 MUNSU board of directors was to last to feature five directors at large. The March 2018 MUNSU general election was the first not to have directors at large in recent MUNSU history.

== Committees ==
The board is broken down bi-weekly into several different working committees, chaired by at least one executive director. Committees include:

- Advocacy Committee - chaired by the Director of Advocacy
- Campaigns and Actions Committee - chaired by the Director of Campaigns
- Student Life and Funding Committee - chaired by the Director of Student Life
- Finance and Services Committee - chaired by the Director of Finance and Services
- Membership Engagement Committee - chaired by the Director of External Affairs, Communications, and Research
- Hiring Committee - chaired by the Director of Finance and Services
- Women and Marginalized Genders Committee - chaired by the Women and Marginalized Genders Representative and a non-male member of the executive
- Elections Committee - chaired by the CRO (Chief Returning Officer) or a designate
- Breezeway Working Group - chaired by the Director of Finance and Services
- Policy Review Committee - chaired by the Director of External Affairs, Communications, and Research

== Services ==
The MUN Students' Union operates a number of services to meet the needs of members and to offer alternatives to university-provided options at affordable cost to students. Some services include:

- The Breezeway - Student Bar
- CHMR-FM 93.5 - Student radio station
- The Attic - copy shop, post office, general goods
- Health & Dental Insurance
- ISIC (International Student Identity Card) - Student discount card
- SafeDrive - Safe escort service for those travelling off-campus
- Grocery Shuttle - weekly shuttle to and from the grocery store

== Resource Centres ==
The Students' Union currently sponsors seven resource centres:

- The Circle: First Nations, Inuit, & Métis Resource Centre
- Disability Information and Support Centre (DISC)
- International Student Centre (ISC)
- MUN Sexual and Gender Advocacy (MUN SAGA)
- Students Older Than Average (SOTA)
- Student Parents' Assistance and Resource Centre (SPARC)
- Intersections: A Resource Centre for Marginalized Genders

== Activities ==
The union plans several activities for students during the school year, as well as assisting coordinate several community events. These include but are not limited to:

- Fall Welcome Weeks & Orientation Concert
- Winter Welcome & Winter Carnival
- MUN Pride on Campus
- Black History Month at MUN

== Campaigns ==
MUNSU is engaged in several campaigns for change at both the student level and national level.

- Education is a Right
- Fairness for International Students
- Work is Work
- Reconcili-Action
- End Gender-Based Violence
- Trans Healthcare
- Equity and Accessibility
- Free Palestine

Under its bylaws, passed in November 2013, MUNSU is also required to "promote all CFS and CFS-NL related campaigns".

== Achievements ==
MUNSU has been successful in winning and maintaining a tuition freeze at the university, giving Memorial the lowest tuition fees of any Canadian university. The freeze lasted from 1999 until 2022, becoming a significant factor in attracting students to study in Newfoundland and Labrador for over twenty years.

In 2001, MUNSU was successful in winning a 25% reduction in tuition for domestic students that took place over the next three years, and was subsequently frozen in place until 2022.

In 2002, MUNSU won a campaign to have the MUN bookstore stop selling clothing produced in sweatshops.

In 2007, MUNSU held province-wide actions that resulted in the provincial grants program being partially reinstated and, historically, Newfoundland and Labrador becoming the only province to include international students in provincial public health coverage.

In 2009, MUNSU won a campaign to have the interest on Newfoundland and Labrador provincial student loans eliminated.

During Orientation 2009 the union joined with the university administration to ban bottled water from the university campus.

During Budget 2014 (March/April 2014), the Government of Newfoundland and Labrador announced an end to the provincial student loan program, to be replaced with non-repayable up-front needs-based grants.

In early 2023, after Memorial's Faculty Association (MUNFA) went on strike for two weeks, MUNSU won a 10% tuition refund for all undergraduate students that semester despite reluctance from the administration. They did this by using a mass e-mail campaign.

In spring 2023, MUNSU pressured the government into spending $10 million to remove the Campus Renewal Fee, which was a $50 per course mandatory fee for all students at Memorial University and Marine Institute.

Also in 2023, following a petition signed by over two-thirds of engineering students, MUN administration increased stipend work term pay from $2500 to $3500, which was still several thousand dollars below the current minimum wage.

Later in 2023, MUNSU and CFS-NL saved the Student Wellness and Counselling Centre from losing accreditation by convincing MUN administration to re-hire positions they were at the time refusing to fill.

== Controversy and criticism ==
Fall Orientation Concert 2009

In the fall of 2009, MUNSU lost over $100,000 on their annual fall orientation concert. The union brought rapper Snoop Dogg to St. John's Mile One Stadium on September 12, 2009 at a cost of $300,000; however, they only sold 2,500 out of a possible 6,200 seats. Critics claim that the union conducted no market research or survey of the student population to see if the rap act would appeal to them. Several MUNSU directors and members of the student activities committee also came forward saying that the decision was made without their approval or notification.

Copygate/Better Side notebook scandal

In fall of 2009, in their attempts for environmental sustainability and reducing paper use, staff of the MUNSU Copy Centre reused student loan application forms and other government documents that people had faxed, instead of shredding them. The campaign was meant to only reuse paper that did not contain sensitive information, but no procedure was developed. The Government of NL and MUN Chief Information Office Opened an investigation in fall of 2009 into the Better Side Notebook Scandal, referred to as "Copygate", which led to MUNSU discontinuing the Better Side Notebooks. No effort was ever made to find a way to reuse paper and the idea died instead.

Credit card scandal and monetary scandals

In the 2009-2010 academic year, several executive members of the union were accused in an anonymous letter of abusing their union credit cards for personal expenses. A committee was formed to investigate both the source of the letter, its validity, and the executive credit card records. The executive director of student life with the Union resigned in the heat of the controversy.

Prolonged strike of City Transit

In the fall semester of 2010, Metrobus, the city transit on which the vast majority of commuting students rely, ceased service due to a strike. MUNSU, working closely with related unions, became internally aware of the intended strike in advance and made no move to aid students, whose lives, studies, and careers would be affected by this. Rather, members of MUNSU acting without quorum announced that the union supported the striking bus drivers, picketing alongside and giving the impression that their major service consumers supported them—in effect, prolonging the strike for the remainder of the semester.

Claiming car payments as executive expenses

In winter of 2010, it was revealed that MUNSU executive pre 2010 had claimed car repair payments and the like as executive expenses hidden within their budgets. This was able to occur because MUNSU’s budget simply lists the total aggregate amount spent on each service (Breezeway, Copy Centre) and Misc items, but there is no line item list of all expenses made publicly available unless you request to see it in the MUNSU office."

Parking

In 2010, the university closed the largest student parking area for development into a new lot for the Health Sciences Centre. Students were allowed to use a temporary lot on the construction site of a new residence yet to be built, however due to the commencement of construction as of the 23rd of July that lot is also closed. This leaves the entire university student body with less than 250 parking places. Critics are bashing both the University and the student union for failing to plan and make arrangements for student parking since the developments were announced several years in advance. When questioned about the issue both the university and the union have stated that parking is not in their list of priorities as it does not meet their environmental policy. Before the closure of the student parking lot in early 2010 the university sustainability office sent out a survey asking students leading questions, making them chose between their interests in the environment and their desire for adequate parking. The survey stated the results would be published on the sustainability website; however, as of August 2010, the results are still unpublished. Pressure is still being applied on the union by several groups of students to do something on the issue.

Attempted closure of the Disability Information and Support Centre

In the winter of 2012, the Disability Information and Support Centre, an autonomous organization predating MUNSU underwent organizational restructuring. This process was initiated by a vote of non-confidence against the then president of the organization. By constitutional process, a by-election was to be called to fill the vacancy and move forward from the turbulence. However, MUNSU representatives attempted to claim ownership of the centre by manually changing the door handle to a new key. In the following 8 month legal battle during which several MPs and MHAs involved themselves to aid the centre MUNSU began compiling a list of members of the centre, effectively creating a census of the minority. Refusing to submit to external control from MUNSU the organization internally orchestrated a new election and found a new president whose first act was to document the actions taken against the centre, the relationship between the two organizations, and form a legal snapshot to be sent to local Members of Parliament. Immediately following this the Students Union ceased their antagonism of the centre and their Director of Operations took a year-long sabbatical before resigning.

Centres' Board of Directors reformation

The Centres' Board of Directors is mandated by MUNSU's 2007 Bylaws to meet twice per semester and charged with maintaining the safe operation of the centres. It was designed as a way to bridge the many separate organizations, by giving each two seats on the board. In total the seven centres and MUNSU occupied 16 seats. However, MUNSU left the board unattended. The centres internally appointed their members as procedure dictated and continued to work towards their objectives. In the Fall of 2013 MUNSU became aware that the Board was continuing to operate without them and began immediately editing their bylaws to consolidate authority. Their edits reduced the seats per centre from two seats to one, while increasing MUNSU seats from two to ten. MUNSU edits to their bylaws also posits the MUNSU Resource Coordinator as the Chairperson of the Board, contrary to how the board normally operated.

Not-for-Profit debate

MUNSU, only registered part way as a not-for-profit, had, from 1999 until late 2013, been getting the best both worlds. While effectively a for-profit business, they attempted to make their on-campus bar a success while refusing to pay property taxes. In a case of the Supreme Court of Newfoundland and Labrador, it was MUNSU's position that the Breezeway was an educational facility that should be exempt from paying property taxes along with other already exempt services such as the Attic, a convenience store with fax-room capabilities on campus. MUNSU's original lease agreement with the university cost only $1. The court ruled that while MUN is an educational institution, MUNSU is not and as such MUNSU has been fined $360,000.
