= CBN-FM =

Radio station in Newfoundland and Labrador, Canada

- St. John's, Newfoundland and Labrador; Canada
- Broadcast area: Newfoundland
- Frequency: 106.9 MHz

Programming
- Format: Adult contemporary/Public music
- Network: CBC Music

Ownership
- Owner: Canadian Broadcasting Corporation
- Sister stations: CBN, CBNT-DT

History
- First air date: July 1, 1975
- Call sign meaning: Canadian Broadcasting Corporation Newfoundland

Technical information
- Class: C
- ERP: 100 kW
- HAAT: 221 metres (725 ft)
- Transmitter coordinates: 47°32′4″N 52°47′25″W

Links
- Website: CBC Newfoundland and Labrador

CBN-FM is a Canadian radio station broadcasting in St. John's, Newfoundland and Labrador at 106.9 MHz. The station was launched in 1975. It is part of the CBC's CBC Music network.

Local programming is limited to weather updates and a pre-broadcast of the local Radio One station's Saturday afternoon cultural program, The Performance Hour, on Saturdays at 11:30 a.m. The latter airs primarily to fill time, as some Saturday afternoon programs are timed to air live in both the Atlantic and Eastern time zones. Among CBC Music stations, only CBN-FM and Halifax's CBH-FM air any long-form local programming of this type.

== Rebroadcasters ==
Rebroadcasters of CBN-FM
City of licence	Identifier	Frequency	RECNet	CRTC Decision	Notes
Grand Falls-Windsor	CBN-FM-1	90.7 FM	Query	2000-260	49°11′52.08″N 55°22′5.88″W; Also serves Gander
Corner Brook	CBN-FM-2	91.1 FM	Query	2001-6	48°56′0.96″N 57°58′0.12″W
Deer Lake	CBN-FM-3	90.5 FM	Query	2002-48	49°14′21.84″N 57°28′26.04″W
Stephenville	CBN-FM-4	95.1 FM	Query	2005-48	48°35′22.92″N 58°39′43.92″W
Marystown	CBN-FM-5	91.7 FM	Query	2006-103	47°8′39.12″N 55°8′48.12″W
Baie Verte	CBN-FM-6	95.5 FM	Query	2006-186	49°57′33.84″N 56°18′42.12″W
