= CKGA =

Radio station in Gander, Newfoundland and Labrador

Coordinates: 48°57′37″N 54°39′37″W

- Gander, Newfoundland and Labrador; Canada
- Broadcast area: Central Newfoundland
- Frequency: 650 kHz
- Branding: 590 VOCM

Programming
- Format: Full service radio

Ownership
- Owner: Stingray Group
- Sister stations: CKXD-FM

History
- First air date: 1969
- Former frequencies: 730 kHz (1969–1988)
- Call sign meaning: Canada Knows Gander

Technical information
- Class: B
- Power: 5,000 watts (day and night)

Links
- Website: vocm.com

CKGA is an AM radio station in Gander, Newfoundland and Labrador, Canada, broadcasting on 650 kHz. Owned by Stingray Group, CKGA first went on the air in 1969 on 730 kHz, but moved to 650 in 1988. It is an affiliate of VOCM.

In September 2016, VOCM network station CKCM in Grand Falls-Windsor cancelled their remaining local programming and now simulcast CKGA full-time.
