= CKXX-FM =

Radio station in Corner Brook, Newfoundland and Labrador

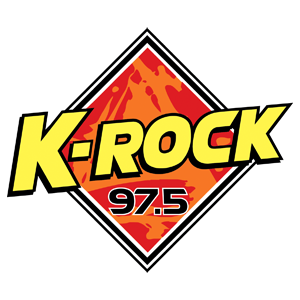
- Corner Brook, Newfoundland and Labrador; Canada
- Broadcast area: Western Newfoundland
- Frequency: 103.9 MHz
- Branding: 97.5 K-Rock

Programming
- Format: Classic rock

Ownership
- Owner: Stingray Group
- Sister stations: CFCB

History
- First air date: August 6, 1984
- Former call signs: CKWK (1984–1989); CKXX (1990–1997)
- Former frequencies: 1340 kHz (1984–1997)
- Call sign meaning: Former "Kixx" branding

Technical information
- Class: B
- ERP: vertical polarization only 40 kW
- HAAT: 160.1 metres (525 ft)
- Transmitter coordinates: 48°55′12.0″N 57°58′10.9″W

Links
- Webcast: Listen Live
- Website: k-rock1039.com

CKXX-FM is a Canadian radio station broadcasting from Corner Brook, Newfoundland and Labrador on 103.9 MHz with a classic rock format branded on-air as 97.5 K-Rock. It is currently owned by Stingray Group.

== History ==
CKXX-FM launched by the noted broadcaster Alex J. Walling on August 6, 1984 as CKWK at 1340 kHz.

For the first year and a half of CKWK's existence, they tried many things to bring up listenership and broaden the appeal of its fledgling station. Many of these programs were quite successful. The Jukebox Saturday Night Party was quite popular and would attract listeners from as far away as Gander who were able to receive CKWK's 10,000-watt signal clearly at night. CKWK would also host themed weekends such as the Rock 'n Roll Weekend and a weekend featuring the History of Country music with Country Radio Legend Ralph Emery.

However, CKWK was up against the incumbent CFCB, whose motto was "The Station You Grew Up On", who at the time played 50% country music from 6AM–6PM. So, in January 1986, the format was changed from country to Top 40/CHR. However, due to the possibility of a conflict with CFCB's evening and overnight Top 40 heavy format, CKXX were forced to change their format to MOR. By the summer of 1987, CKWK had been reduced to a skeleton staff with automation 18 hours a day, using a very limited library of music that was adult contemporary in format. The automation system was far from perfect. Dead air, and two sources playing on air at once were common during that time. The tapes that were used were of such poor quality that even with the limitations imposed by AM broadcasting, a listener with a good ear could notice the low quality sound that the tape provided.

In 1988, CKWK became an affiliate of Music Radio, a national radio service fed to stations via ANIK Satellite that played an AC format. CKWK became CKXX, the station switched to the sister service of Music Radio - Star Country.

On December 31, 1989 at 7:00 PM, the station manager at the time, Fred Trainor, went on the air to announce the transition of CKWK to 1340 KIXX Country/95.1 Deer Lake. CKWK became CKXX and adopted a country format. The first song played was "Guitars, Cadillacs" by Dwight Yoakam.

Over the first few months, CKXX was locally staffed for 18 hours a day with overnight programming being provided by satellite. The service was called Star Country. Eventually, it would be replaced by Country Coast to Coast - Cryin', Lovin' or Leavin' with Shelly Fraiser as well as other network announcers. At one point, Country Coast to Coast was piped in as much as 15 hours a day with local announcers doing morning/afternoon drive as well as noon shows. The style of Country music played on CKXX was a blend of current day Country music hits mixed with Classic Country from 1960 to the present day.

In 1997, CKXX moved to 103.9 FM, retaining the country format it ran for years until the early 2000s, when it re-branded from KIXX Country to Magic 103 with a hot adult contemporary format, and shortly afterwards to 103.9 K-Rock. The other two "KIXX" stations outside of St. John's, CKXD-FM in Gander and CKXG-FM in Grand Falls-Windsor, were also branded with the "Magic" name and then subsequently to "K-Rock", which aired an active rock format until January 26, 2009, where it changed its format to classic rock after a listener opinion poll.

On December 20, 1999, the CRTC approved the application for authority to acquire the assets of CKXX-FM Corner Brook and its transmitter CKXX-FM-1 Stephenville from Western Broadcasting Limited (Western), and for a broadcasting license to continue the operation of this undertaking.

As of March 9, 2022, CKXX no longer originates any local programming from Corner Brook following the closure of its studios and termination of on-air personnel by Stingray. All content of this station is now simulcast from VOCM-FM in St. John's, with the exception of local commercials. CKXX's sister station, CFCB, also shared the same fate as it shared studio facilities and personalities.

== Rebroadcasters ==
CKXX had a rebroadcaster in Deer Lake (CKXX-1-FM, originally CJDY-FM) at 95.1 MHz, but was shut down after switching frequencies. There is now a rebroadcaster in Stephenville (CKXX-FM-1), originally at 95.3 MHz, but later moved to 95.9 in 2005.
