= CKSJ-FM =

Radio station in St. John's, Newfoundland and Labrador

- St. John's, Newfoundland and Labrador; Canada
- Broadcast area: Avalon Peninsula; Clarenville
- Frequency: 101.1 MHz
- Branding: Coast 101.1

Programming
- Format: Classic hits

Ownership
- Owner: Andrew Bell; (Coast Broadcasting Ltd.)

History
- First air date: February 12, 2004
- Call sign meaning: St. John's

Technical information
- Class: C
- ERP: 20,000 watts
- HAAT: 221 metres (725 ft)
- Transmitter coordinates: 47°32′01.8″N 52°47′21.7″W

Links
- Webcast: Listen Live
- Website: coast1011.com

CKSJ-FM (101.1 MHz, Coast 101.1) is a radio station broadcasting in St. John's, Newfoundland and Labrador, Canada. Approved by the Canadian Radio-television and Telecommunications Commission in 2003, the station began broadcasting on February 12, 2004, and is the most recent radio station to have launched in that city. It is owned by Coast Broadcasting, which is owned by local businessman Andrew Bell.

While launching as an adult contemporary station, it now defines its format as classic hits, concentrating primarily on older music. As of 2011, the station's classic hits format consists of music from the 1970s, 80s and 90s along with some select songs from the late 60s and early 2000s.

Specialty programs airing on the station include The '70s with Charlie Tuna, and Cool Jazz on the Coast hosted by Bill Sharpe.

On August 1, 2014, Coast Broadcasting was given permission to add a new FM transmitter in Clarenville, simulcasting CKSJ in areas where reception of the primary signal is difficult. CKSJ-FM-1 went on the air in July 2015 at 107.5 MHz to the Clarenville area.

In July 2016, the CRTC approved a change in ownership for the station. Co-owner Andrew Bell had applied to take over 100% of the company.

== Rebroadcasters ==
Rebroadcasters of CKSJ
City of licence	Identifier	Frequency	RECNet	Notes
Clarenville	CKSJ-FM-1	107.5 FM	Query	48°07′40.00″N 53°56′29.0″W
