= VOWR =

Radio station in St. John's, Newfoundland and Labrador

- St. John's, Newfoundland and Labrador; Canada
- Broadcast area: St. John's Metropolitan Area
- Frequency: 800 kHz
- Branding: VOWR

Programming
- Format: Full-service/community radio Christian radio

Ownership
- Owner: Wesley United Church Radio Board

History
- First air date: July 20, 1924 as 8WMC
- Former call signs: 8WMC (1924–1932)
- Call sign meaning: Voice of Wesley Radio

Technical information
- Class: B
- Power: 10,000 watts day; 2,500 watts night
- Transmitter coordinates: 47°34′15.9″N 52°45′09.6″W

Links
- Webcast: Listen Live
- Website: vowr.ca

VOWR (800 kHz) is a non-commercial, listener-supported radio station in St. John's, Newfoundland and Labrador, Canada. The station is operated by the Wesley United Church of Canada with studios and offices at 101 Patrick Street.

VOWR is a Class B AM station. By day, it transmits 10,000 watts. To avoid interference at night, VOWR reduces power to 2,500 watts. It uses a omnidirectional antenna. The transmitter is located adjacent to Mount Scio Road Pippy Park of St. John's.

== Programming ==
VOWR airs a mix of 30% Christian radio programming and 70% secular programming. Secular programming includes adult standards from the 1940s through the 1970s, along with classical, folk, classic country, oldies, marching band and beautiful music. There are also interviews and informational programs including "Consumer Reports," a gardening show, the 50+ Radio Show and others on a wide range of subjects.

VOWR is staffed by volunteers, many of them former broadcasters in the public and private local broadcasting industry.

== History ==
VOWR first signed on the air on July 20, 1924. Its original experimental call sign was 8WMC, which stood for the Wesley Methodist Church until it was the call letters of VOWR in 1925. Reverend Joseph G. Joyce (1889–1959) started the station to provide a companion to people unable to get to services; however, it soon expanded to provide public service programming and entertainment.

== Callsign ==
VOWR is one of just four broadcast radio stations in Canada whose callsigns do not begin with CB (for the CBC), CF, CH, CI, CJ, or CK. The others, VOCM, VOCM-FM and VOAR-FM, are also based in the St. John's area. With exception of VOCM-FM, which launched in 1982, all of these stations were founded before Newfoundland joined the Canadian Confederation in 1949. The ITU prefix VO was originally assigned to Newfoundland and remains in use by radio amateurs.
