= CKIX-FM =

Radio station in St. John's, Newfoundland and Labrador

- St. John's, Newfoundland and Labrador; Canada
- Broadcast area: Avalon Peninsula
- Frequency: 99.1 MHz
- Branding: Hot 99.1

Programming
- Format: Contemporary hit radio

Ownership
- Owner: Stingray Radio
- Sister stations: CJYQ; VOCM; VOCM-FM

History
- First air date: October 15, 1983
- Call sign meaning: "KIXX" (former branding)

Technical information
- Class: C
- ERP: 100,000 watts
- HAAT: 180.5 metres (592 ft)
- Transmitter coordinates: 47°32′55.6″N 52°41′53.4″W

Links
- Webcast: Listen live
- Website: hot991.ca

CKIX-FM is a Canadian radio station broadcasting on 99.1 FM in St. John's, Newfoundland and Labrador, Canada. The station currently broadcasts a contemporary hit radio format branded as Hot 99.1. The station is owned by Stingray Group.

== History ==
Launched by CHUM Limited on October 15, 1983, CKIX-FM originally carried a country format known as Country 99 FM and then later in the 1980s as KIXX Country. Newcap acquired CKIX and sister station CJYQ from CHUM in 1989. In 1991, the studios were relocated from Duckworth Street to 208 Kenmount Road (which the Capital Hotel now occupies).

On February 17, 2002, Newcap converted its recently acquired VOCM-FM from hot AC to classic rock. As an unexpected side effect, CKIX's audience dropped significantly. Moreover, rival station CHOZ-FM, which carried a combination of CHR and classic rock at the time, elected to retain that hybrid format rather than move into the former "Magic" niche. As a result, on June 28 of the same year, Newcap dropped CKIX's longtime country format in favour of Top 40/CHR as 99.1 Hits FM. Originally, the morning show was hosted by Paul Magee and Erin Chase, but by the summer of 2003, managed to lure away longtime CHOZ host Randy Snow. The country format moved to VOCM, in line with Newcap's other AM stations across the province at the time. The "KIXX Country" branding would eventually be revived on CHVO-FM in Carbonear and CJYQ in St. John's.

On January 2, 2012, regarding CHOZ-FM's format shift back to hot adult contemporary, the station returned to their Top 40/CHR format as it has been always a reporter to the Canadian top 40 panel.

In 2019, Snow left CKIX to return to CHOZ after 16 years.

On May 21, 2021, CKIX rebranded as Hot 99.1, ending nearly 19 years of the "Hits FM" branding, keeping the same format.

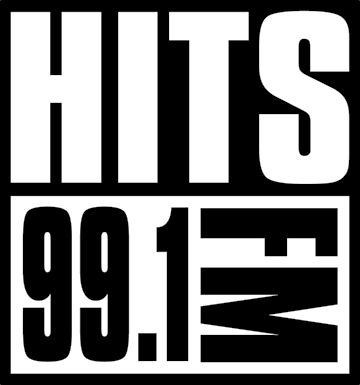
former logo as "99.1 Hits FM"

== "Missing 9" contest ==
In late August 2008, CKIX temporarily began identifying itself as 9.1 Hits FM; its actual broadcast frequency had not changed (although the "9.1" was also used in the station's legal IDs). Promotional signs throughout the listening area were also modified to appear as though the "9" had been removed. No reason for the change was given until September 8, when it was revealed that the missing digit had been "abducted" and hidden somewhere in the station's listening area, prompting a scavenger hunt-style contest where the abductor periodically "hijacked" the station's signal to provide clues to find a physical "9" object, and the station providing a $10,000 reward for its safe return.

The "9" was found on October 6 in the back of a pick-up truck adjacent to a private self-storage facility in a St. John's suburb, and returned to the station that morning. However, a video later posted by the station indicated that the truck only arrived at that location that day, generating some controversy and complaints to the station.

A later investigation by the Canadian Broadcast Standards Council's Atlantic Regional Panel revealed that the "9" had been located in a storage locker at the aforementioned self-storage facility (without the knowledge of that facility, presumably to ensure that employees of that facility could not gain an unfair advantage), with the intention that the clues would allow a listener to access that locker and retrieve the object. While some listeners were apparently able to identify the facility, they were unsuccessful in retrieving the digit, prompting the facility to post a "no trespassing" sign disavowing any relationship to the Hits FM contest. According to the station, this forced the relocation of the item.

The CBSC panel later ruled that CKIX-FM's handling of the "Missing 9" contest, specifically placing the object such that it was not reasonably accessible to the public at the outset, and later moving the object in contradiction of the broadcast clues, violated Clause 12 of the Canadian Association of Broadcasters' Code of Ethics. That clause states that "[a]ll on-air contests and promotions shall be conceived and conducted fairly and legitimately and particular care shall be taken to ensure that they are not misleading". As is standard practice for CBSC violations, the station was required to announce the decision twice during peak listening hours.
