= VOAR-FM =

Christian radio station in Mount Pearl, Newfoundland and Labrador

- Mount Pearl, Newfoundland and Labrador; Canada
- Frequency: 96.7 MHz
- Branding: Lighthouse FM

Programming
- Format: Christian

Ownership
- Owner: The Seventh-day Adventist Church in Newfoundland & Labrador

History
- First air date: 1929
- Former call signs: 8BSL (1929–1930); 8RA (1930–1931); VONA (1931–1933); VOAC (1933–1938)
- Former frequencies: 1230 kHz (1950s-1991); 1210 kHz (1991–2020)
- Call sign meaning: Voice Of Adventist Radio

Technical information
- Class: C
- ERP: 100,000 watts
- HAAT: 156.6 metres (514 ft)
- Transmitter coordinates: 47°32′04.6″N 52°49′19.5″W

Links
- Webcast: Listen Live
- Website: lighthousefm.org

VOAR-FM (96.7 MHz) is a Canadian radio station, which airs a Christian radio format. It is licensed to Mount Pearl, Newfoundland and Labrador, and serves the St. John's metropolitan area. VOAR is owned by the Seventh-day Adventist Church in Newfoundland and Labrador. Its radio studios and offices are on Topsail Road in Mount Pearl.

VOAR-FM is a Class C FM station. The transmitter is off Kenmount Road, also in Mount Pearl. The effective radiated power (ERP) is 100,000 watts, the maximum for most Canadian FM stations.

== Programming ==
VOAR airs a blend of Christian talk and teaching programs along with Contemporary Christian music. Religious leaders heard on VOAR include Charles Stanley, Jim Daly, Joni Eareckson Tada and Chuck Swindoll.

== History ==
=== Early years ===
VOAR first began broadcasting in the fall of 1929 as 8BSL. In 1930, the station was renamed 8RA. It received the call sign VONA (Voice of the North Atlantic) in 1931 (using the ITU prefix VO that was assigned to the Dominion of Newfoundland before it joined Canada. It later switched to VOAC (Voice of the Adventist Church) in 1933, then once more to its current call sign, VOAR (Voice of Adventist Radio) in 1938. VOAR is one of four Canadian stations, along with VOWR 800, VOCM 590 and VOCM-FM 97.5, to still use call signs beginning with VO rather than C.

Over the years, the station switched its frequency several times. From the 1950s through 1991, it broadcast at 1230 kHz, originally powered at only 100 watts.

It then moved to its final AM frequency, 1210. The new dial position was coupled with a boost in power to 10,000 watts, which was approved by the Canadian Radio-television and Telecommunications Commission (CRTC) in 1991. But because 1210 is a clear channel frequency reserved for Class A WPHT Philadelphia, VOAR used a directional antenna to avoid interference. It later moved its city of license from St. John's to Mount Pearl, the community where its transmitter and studios are located.

=== Expanding through Canada ===
In 2002, VOAR began adding a network of FM rebroadcasters, while the main station was still being heard on the AM band in St. John's. At first, the rebroadcasting stations were in small communities around Newfoundland and Labrador.

In recent years, VOAR has expanded into other provinces and territories. It currently has about 30 rebroadcasters, stretching across Canada. It is heard in four provinces and in the Northwest Territories.

=== Moving to FM ===
VOAR logo prior to FM transition.

On October 6, 2016, the CRTC received an application from VOAR to move to the FM band, with the call sign VOAR-FM. The proposed new station would have an effective radiated power (ERP) of 100,000 watts. At the same time, it would shut down its AM signal and its Bay Roberts repeater, VOAR-1-FM 95.9. The other VOAR repeaters would begin simulcasting the new FM signal. Reasons for the conversion request stated in the application were listener confusion with VOWR 800 AM (both stations receive each other's mail), signal reception issues in portions of the St. John's area, and the AM station's transmitter (installed in 1990) reaching the end of its usable life.

On June 27, 2017, the CRTC approved VOAR's application to replace its AM radio station VOAR and its rebroadcaster in Bay Roberts. The new FM station in Mount Pearl would operate at 96.7 MHz with an ERP of 100,000 watts using a non-directional antenna at a height above average terrain (HAAT) of 156.8 metres (515 feet). VOAR began testing its new FM transmitter in December 2018. It officially signed on the air the following month.

VOAR completed its transitions to FM with the station's moniker becoming Lighthouse FM. On January 10, 2020, the AM signal shut down.

== Rebroadcasters ==
In 2002, VOAR added several FM rebroadcasters in various parts of the province, too far from St. John's to get a clear signal from the AM transmitter. Over the years, other rebroadcasters were added in other Canadian provinces and territories. VOAR is also carried across Canada on Bell Satellite TV Channel 950 and locally on Rogers Cable Channel 929.

A new broadcasting license was issued in 2008. Also in 2008, several transmitters were put on the air in British Columbia.

Rebroadcasters of VOAR-FM
City of licence	Identifier	Frequency	Power	Class	RECNet
Marystown, Newfoundland	VOAR-2-FM	99.5 FM	15 watts	LP	Query
Lewisporte, Newfoundland	VOAR-3-FM	91.7 FM	50 watts	LP	Query
Gander, Newfoundland	VOAR-4-FM	89.7 FM	50 watts	LP	Query
Deer Lake, Newfoundland	VOAR-5-FM	102.1 FM	50 watts	LP	Query
Botwood, Newfoundland	VOAR-6-FM	101.1 FM	50 watts	LP	Query
Springdale, Newfoundland	VOAR-7-FM	103.3 FM	50 watts	LP	Query
Grand Falls-Windsor, Newfoundland	VOAR-8-FM	98.3 FM	250 watts	A1	Query
Corner Brook, Newfoundland	VOAR-9-FM	105.7 FM	240 watts	A1	Query
Port aux Basques, Newfoundland	VOAR-10-FM	99.9 FM	50 watts	LP	Query
Happy Valley-Goose Bay, Newfoundland	VOAR-11-FM	101.9 FM	250 watts	A1	Query
Wabush, Newfoundland	VOAR-12-FM	102.5 FM	50 watts	LP	Query
Bridgewater, Nova Scotia	VOAR-13-FM	107.1 FM	50 watts	LP	Query
Cranbrook, British Columbia	VF2497	106.5 FM	16 watts	LP	Query
Creston, British Columbia	VF2507	92.9 FM	17 watts	LP	Query
Golden, British Columbia	VF2508	99.9 FM	14 watts	LP	Query
Nakusp, British Columbia	VF2515	92.9 FM	25 watts	LP	Query
Williams Lake, British Columbia	VF2519	95.1 FM	50 watts	LP	Query
Kamloops, British Columbia	VF2525	95.1 FM	50 watts	LP	Query
Hope, British Columbia	VF2532	94.1 FM	50 watts	LP	Query
Inuvik, Northwest Territories	VF2533	92.7 FM	50 watts	LP	Query
Terrace, British Columbia	VF2535	101.5 FM	50 watts	LP	Query
100 Mile House, British Columbia	VF2577	106.7 FM	30 watts	LP	Query
Quesnel, British Columbia	VF8026	92.3 FM	50 watts	LP	Query
Shellbrook, Saskatchewan	VF2562	92.1 FM	5 watts	LP	Query
Swift Current, Saskatchewan	VF2588	92.1 FM	5 watts	LP	Query
Inuvik, Northwest Territories	VF2533	92.7 FM	5 watts	LP	Query

The station also had repeaters in Prince George, British Columbia 107.3 (VF2510); Kamloops 105.1 (VF2525); Kelowna 98.9; and Oliver 106.1 (VF2524). However, they were taken off the air due to licensing issues with the CRTC in January 2009. The station also had applications to expand into 25 additional communities in British Columbia in early 2009.
