= CJYQ =

Radio station in St. John's, Newfoundland and Labrador

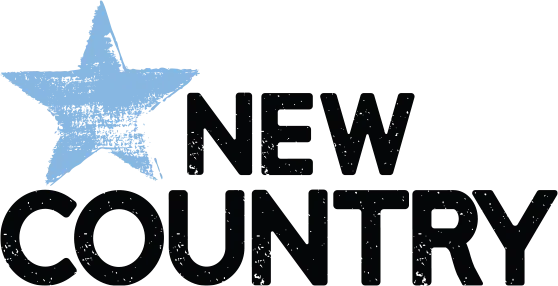
- St. John's, Newfoundland and Labrador; Canada
- Broadcast area: St. John's Metropolitan Area
- Frequency: 930 kHz
- Branding: New Country 930

Programming
- Format: Country
- Affiliations: Westwood One

Ownership
- Owner: Stingray Group
- Sister stations: VOCM, VOCM-FM, CKIX-FM

History
- First air date: October 25, 1950
- Former call signs: CJON (1950–1978)

Technical information
- Class: B
- Power: 25,000 watts day; 3,500 watts night
- Transmitter coordinates: 47°32′39.1″N 52°46′36.7″W

Links
- Website: newcountrynl.ca

CJYQ (930 AM) is a radio station in St. John's, Newfoundland and Labrador, Canada. Owned by Stingray Group and airing a country format, the station is currently branded as New Country 930.

== History ==
The station was launched in 1950 as CJON and was owned by the Newfoundland Broadcasting Company (Geoff Stirling and Don Jamieson), which launched CJON-TV in 1955. The company later launched additional AM stations throughout the province.

In 1978, Jamieson transferred his interest in Newfoundland Broadcasting to Stirling in exchange for the AM stations. As part of the deal, the stations changed call signs, in CJON's case to CJYQ. All the new call signs ended in "Q", so the group became known as the Q Radio Network.

In 1983, Jamieson sold the stations to CHUM Limited. During CHUM's ownership, CJYQ continued to air a Top 40 music format under the Q93 branding, while the remainder of the Q Radio Network stations outside the St. John's area slowly became oldies stations from time-to-time. In 1990, the last remaining Q radio stations were sold again to Newcap Broadcasting, which quickly converted the AM stations outside St. John's to country (fed from co-owned CKIX-FM). Two of the stations owned by Q were closed soon after, while the others eventually converted to FM.

CJYQ dropped its Top 40 music format in May 1991, and the station flipped to oldies, retaining its Q93 name under the branding Classic Hits Q93, as it was known under Newcap. The station continued to be an apparently viable station until the late 1990s, when the station was quietly switched to full-time automation, dropping all but a bare minimum of announcers (shared with CKIX and later VOCM) to read weather forecasts and other brief segments. In 2000, when Newcap proposed to purchase the VOCM group, the longtime rival of CJYQ, it proposed to keep the latter station, which it would not have normally been entitled to do in a market the size of St. John's (where the maximum number of stations per ownership group is three). In exchange the station would air a greater amount of Canadian content than required (40% instead of 35%), of which at least half (or 20% overall) would have to be Newfoundland music.

The CRTC permitted this, and at noon on September 8, 2000, the station became Radio Newfoundland. This may have caused some minor confusion as VOCM had occasionally used that name for group branding in prior years. Since the changeover, CJYQ has in fact even exceeded its higher requirements, with almost 80% Newfoundland content. However, it continues to be a largely automated station with few regular on-air staff, although the station does air some long-form magazine programs on the weekend.

As Radio Newfoundland, the station occasionally played station IDs recorded by Newfoundland musicians that opted to call the station Radio Newfoundland and Labrador, as a result of the province's official name change in 2001. However, this was not a reflection of the station's actual brand at the time; in fact, the station's signal does not reach Labrador, and little if any of the station's programming or music originated there. (Newcap did have a separate operation branded as Radio Labrador (now known as Big Land FM) however, this station is part of the main VOCM network, and airs a mix of adult contemporary music outside of network programming.)

The station adopted its This is Newfoundland and Labrador branding in April 2010 to coincide with the launch of a new Newcap-owned tourism portal of the same name. On January 28, 2014, a fire destroyed CJYQ's broadcasting tower, knocking the station of off the air. It transmitted over the Internet until repairs were completed in February. On April 14, 2015, the country music format that had previously aired on VOCM moved to CJYQ, which coincidentally rebranded as 930 KIXX Country.

Previous logo

On April 30, 2021, CJYQ was rebranded as New Country 930 to align with other country-formatted stations owned by Stingray.

== Sports ==
CJYQ previously carried St. John's Maple Leafs games over the air, the last two seasons of the St. John's Fog Devils, and carried St. John's IceCaps games over the air from October 2011 to April 2017.
