= VOCM-FM =

Radio station in St. John's, Newfoundland and Labrador

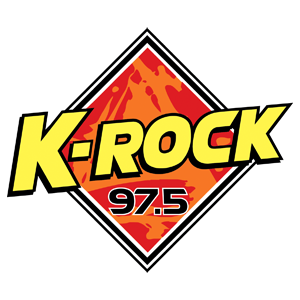
- St. John's, Newfoundland and Labrador; Canada
- Broadcast area: Avalon Peninsula; Clarenville
- Frequency: 97.5 MHz
- Branding: 97.5 K-Rock

Programming
- Format: Classic rock

Ownership
- Owner: Stingray Group
- Sister stations: VOCM; CJYQ; CKIX-FM

History
- First air date: September 1982
- Call sign meaning: Voice of the Common Man

Technical information
- Class: C
- ERP: 100,000 watts
- HAAT: 169.5 metres (556 ft)
- Transmitter coordinates: 47°32′39.1″N 52°46′36.7″W
- Repeater: (VOCM-FM-1) 100.7 MHz (Clarenville)

Links
- Webcast: Listen live
- Website: www.krockrocks.com

VOCM-FM is a commercial radio station broadcasting at 97.5 MHz from St. John's, Newfoundland and Labrador, Canada. Owned by Stingray Group, the station is branded as 97.5 K-Rock and broadcasts a classic rock format; however, some 2000s rock songs have become part of the mix.

== History ==
Originally launched in September 1982, it was called VO Stereo and later as 97.5 VOFM and in the mid-1990s as Magic 97.

After a limited success with its easy listening format in the early 1980s as VO Stereo, a management decision was undertaken to pursue a younger audience.

The late 1980s under the direction of manager Gary Butler and music Director Pat Murphy, the station began programming a mix of new and classic rock with great success. In less than two years, the station vaulted from last place to the number one FM station in St. John's with a predominantly young male audience. Although pleased with the results, management set about to build a stronger audience that would include more female listeners.

In 1990, Celebration Saturdays was introduced to station listeners. It was a three-hour block of party-themed music sponsored by Bender's On George, a local nightclub, hosted by Mike Campbell and later Mike Thomas (Mickey T). Its success led to the creation of the Celebration Roadshow on Friday nights starting in the summer of 1996. Celebration Saturdays was the last show aired on "Magic" before the switch to 97.5 K-Rock.

Former "Magic 97" logo

=== K-Rock (2002–present) ===
By early 2002, soon after Newcap bought the VOCM stations from the Butler family, its audience had apparently dipped enough that Newcap changed the format to classic rock, a format where research indicated untapped potential. It soon became the top-rated FM station in the St. John's market. Unexpectedly, much of its audience came from country station CKIX-FM, also a Newcap property. It was enough that this station was promptly reformatted as well; it became a Top 40/CHR station, serving much of the audience lost after the end of "Magic". The first song ever played on "K-Rock" was "Layla" by Derek and the Dominos.

On Sundays from 8am to 1pm, The Homebrew Show hosted by Sam Whiffen plays traditional Newfoundland, Celtic and Irish music not only on this station, but on all other K-Rock stations throughout the province. Other K-Rock shows heard provincewide include K-Rock Mornings with Campbell, Candice & JLaC on weekday mornings and Saturday in Big Tom's Shed hosted by JLaC.

== Rebroadcasters ==
City of licence	Identifier	Frequency	Power	Class	RECNet	Notes
Clarenville	VOCM-FM-1	100.7 FM	2,200 watts	B	Query	
Corner Brook	CKXX-FM	103.9 FM	35,400 watts	C1	Query	Inserts local advertising targeted towards the Corner Brook area.
Gander	CKXD-FM	98.7 FM	4,800 watts	A	Query	Inserts local advertising targeted towards the Gander area.
Grand Falls-Windsor	CKXG-FM	102.3 FM	17,000 watts	B	Query	Inserts local advertising targeted towards the Grand Falls-Windsor area.
Lewisporte	CKXG-FM-1	101.3 FM	50 watts	LP	Query	Rebroadcasts directly from CKXG-FM, including advertisements
Stephenville	CKXX-FM-1	95.9 FM	234 watts	A1	Query	Rebroadcasts directly from CKXX-FM, including advertisements

The sole rebroadcaster of the station licensed as such is VOCM-FM-1 Clarenville, which broadcasts at 100.7 MHz. Three other separately-licensed Stingray stations in the province (CKXD-FM Gander, CKXG-FM Grand Falls-Windsor and CKXX-FM Corner Brook) also feature the K-Rock brand and format, and as of 2022 rebroadcast the content of VOCM-FM except that they insert local advertising. CKXG-FM and CKXX-FM both have their own rebroadcasters: CKXG-FM-1 Lewisporte and CKXX-FM-1 Stephenville.

== Unusual callsign ==
VOCM-FM is one of two Canadian FM stations with a call sign beginning with the ITU prefix "VO". VOCM-FM and its sister station VOCM are among just four radio stations in Canada still bearing call signs beginning with "VO" (the other two being VOAR and VOWR), issued to the Dominion of Newfoundland before its confederation into Canada in 1949. VOCM-FM first went on the air in 1982, well after Newfoundland became a Canadian province. However, the station took the historic callsign of its sister station VOCM, which FM stations in Canada may do, by adding the "-FM" suffix.
