= VOCM (AM) =

Radio station in St. John's, Newfoundland and Labrador, Canada

- St. John's, Newfoundland and Labrador; Canada
- Broadcast area: Avalon Peninsula
- Frequency: 590 kHz
- Branding: 590 VOCM

Programming
- Format: Full-service radio

Ownership
- Owner: Stingray Group
- Sister stations: CJYQ, VOCM-FM, CKIX-FM

History
- First air date: October 19, 1936
- Former frequencies: 1005 kHz (1936–1949)
- Call sign meaning: "Voice of the Common Man"

Technical information
- Licensing authority: CRTC
- Class: B
- Power: 20,000 watts
- Transmitter coordinates: 47°32′37.5″N 52°46′45.2″W

Links
- Webcast: Listen live
- Website: vocm.com

VOCM (590 AM) is a radio station licensed to St. John's, Newfoundland and Labrador, Canada. Owned by Stingray Group, VOCM first went on the air on October 19, 1936. Through the "VOCM / Big Land FM Radio Network" of stations owned by Stingray, VOCM programming is carried throughout the province.

VOCM and its sister station VOCM-FM are among the four radio stations in Canada having call signs beginning with the prefix VO, the ITU prefix issued to the Dominion of Newfoundland before its confederation into Canada in 1949. The other two, VOWR and VOAR-FM, also broadcast in St. John's; all but VOCM-FM predate the confederation. VOCM-FM adopted the callsign in 1982 because of its corporate association with VOCM; all three of the others signed on before 1949, while Newfoundland was still a dominion, and were allowed to keep the "VO" call signs despite the end of Newfoundland's sovereignty. During the time when the United States had bases in Newfoundland and Labrador, the American Forces Radio and Television Service operated radio station with the "VO" call signs including the last—VOUS in Argentia, which closed in the late 1960s. The rest of Canada's radio stations use call signs of CB (for the CBC), CF, CH, CI, CJ and CK. VOCM 590 kHz is frequently audible in Western Europe after nightfall, usually ahead of other long distance North American AM station reception.

Stingray also owns a number of other AM stations in Newfoundland and Labrador that use VOCM as their main or secondary brand. These stations all have C callsigns.

== History ==
VOCM was started by Walter Banks Williams III, and his father in the family home at 80 Circular Road in St. John's. Williams was very interested in radio, and had attended training at the RCA and the Radio Training Schools in the United States.

On December 22, 1933, Williams (through his company, Atlantic Broadcasting Co.) was issued a licence by the Newfoundland Post and Telegraph Department to operate a station from the second floor of the aforementioned family home. With the transmitter and other equipment built by Williams, VOCM began operations as an experimental father-son station operating only a few hours a day. The station's antenna was built in the backyard and the technical equipment was placed in a backroom on the main floor. VOCM had truly been a family affair for some time; Walter's son, Walter David Williams, later joined him in working long hours at the radio station for many years.

Later in 1937, Joseph Butler joined Williams as a partner in VOCM radio, through Colonial Broadcasting System Ltd. In 1954, Butler died in a plane accident, and in 1958 Joseph Butler Jr. acquired control of the company. Williams continued to work with the company until 1972, two years before his death in 1974.

In 1982, Colonial Broadcasting System changed its name to VOCM Radio Newfoundland Ltd. At this time the company had established a network of stations throughout eastern and central Newfoundland, as well as a sister FM station, VOCM-FM.

In May 2000, the assets of VOCM Radio were acquired by Harry Steele's Newfoundland Capital Corporation, which operated the stations as part of the Steele Communications division of Newcap Radio.

In September 2016, VOCM network stations CHCM in Marystown and CKVO in Clarenville went off the air and began to simulcast VOCM full-time. On March 9, 2022, VOCM network stations CFCB in Corner Brook and CKGA in Gander began simulcasting VOCM full-time as well. As of September 2026, the current VOCM Radio Network comprises VOCM itself, CHCM-FM, CKVO, CFCB, CKGA, CFSX and CKCM, alongside its repeaters (CKIM and CKCM-1-FM).

== Programming ==
=== Talk shows ===
VOCM programming includes talk shows such as Open Line with Brian Callahan, and On Target with Linda Swain, where Newfoundland and Labrador-related issues are discussed with callers and emails/tweets sent to the station are read and discussed. These programs are well-known and often perform highly in the radio ratings province-wide. Both shows are generally considered to be non-partisan and are not driven by the hosts' personalities, unlike the majority of contemporary North American talk radio programs.

During the late 1990s, the VOCM network experimented with syndicated talk programming in the form of the Dr. Laura Schlessinger show, which aired on tape delay in the early evening. As with most Canadian stations airing the program, it was quietly dropped shortly after a Canadian Broadcast Standards Council ruling admonishing the host for making comments the CBSC claimed were discriminatory. While VOCM continues to air some short syndicated features and occasionally brokered programming (i.e. infomercials) on Sunday mornings, it does not regularly air other extended-length syndicated programming.

On December 1, 2016, VOCM expanded its talk programming to include syndicated programs such as Coast to Coast AM as well as shows that feature experts in the fields of finance, real estate and renewable energy sources. In addition, Tim Powers had his own show on VOCM that aired Fridays at 6:00 p.m. with a repeat at 2:00 on Sunday afternoons. Unlike Open Line, BackTalk or NightLine, Tim interviewed various individuals to go beyond the headlines. Conversations with John Moore featured the CFRB personality interviewing celebrities, authors, athletes and others from a wide range of subject areas.

As time progressed, the expansion of talk radio was met with negative feedback from its listeners, even taking to social media and expressing their anger over the change (including the lack of music). Therefore, since August 21, 2017, VOCM has reverted to its Full Service format, reincorporating music in its programming.

=== Sports ===
VOCM's play-by-play sports coverage is currently limited to the Royal St. John's Regatta every August, and in some cases the Herder Memorial Trophy championship games. The VOCM network had carried the games of the American Hockey League's St. John's Maple Leafs throughout the 1990s. VOCM does not typically broadcast play-by-play coverage of out-of-market sports events, unlike most other full-service or news-talk stations in medium-sized Canadian markets, again since it would interfere with live talk programming.

=== Music ===
Outside of its talk programming, VOCM previously used a country format, having adopted that format in mid-2002 shortly after sister station CKIX-FM dropped country music. Before that, the St. John's station had aired a mix of soft adult contemporary and classic hits, veering more towards the latter since CJYQ's flip to Newfoundland music in 2000; however, most VOCM network stations had carried a country format since at least the early 1990s. From the 1960s until the 1990s, the St. John's station carried a longtime Top 40 music format.

VOCM switches to an all-Christmas music format every year running until the playing of "Auld Lang Syne" at New Years Eve. The Christmas music typically starts on the day of the yearly Dial-a-Carol event in late November. Dial-a-Carol is an annual fundraising effort by VOCM's charity, the VOCM Cares Foundation, where listeners call in to make pledges and request their favourite Christmas songs be played. It is often commented on-air how overwhelming the requests are for Jim Reeves' "Old Christmas Card", sometimes having to play it multiple times per hour.

On April 14, 2015 at 10:00p.m., VOCM, without notice, shifted its country format over to CJYQ and returned to its pre-2002 format of soft AC and classic hits, playing soft to medium tempo hits focusing on popular music from the 1970s to the mid-1980s. Examples of artists featured under the new format include Glass Tiger, Billy Joel, The Human League, Foreigner, Berlin, and Bob Seger.

Other specific programs include: Your VOCM Mornings, which carries a variety of information features (such as school information); the Saturday Night Cabin Party with Brian O'Connell, which is devoted to classic country music from the 1960s to the 1990s; and the VOCM Saturday Morning Irish Newfoundland Show with Greg Smith, playing Newfoundland music.
