= List of Christian radio stations in Canada =

This is a list of Christian radio stations in Canada by province.

| Call sign | Frequency | City of licence | Owner |
|---|---|---|---|
== Alberta ==
| CJLI | 700 AM | Calgary | Touch Canada Broadcasting |
| CJSI-FM | 88.9 FM | Calgary | Touch Canada Broadcasting |
| CIAM-FM | 92.7 FM | Fort Vermilion | CIAM Media & Radio Broadcasting Association |
| CJCA | 930 AM | Edmonton | Touch Canada Broadcasting |
| CJRY-FM | 105.9 FM | Edmonton | Touch Canada Broadcasting |
| CKOS-FM | 91.1 FM | Fort McMurray | UCB Radio Canada |
| CJGY-FM | 96.3 FM | Grande Prairie | Golden West Broadcasting Ltd. |
| CJLT-FM | 93.7 FM | Medicine Hat | UCB Radio Canada |
| CKRD-FM | 90.5 FM | Red Deer | Touch Canada Broadcasting |
| VF8020 | 93.3 FM | Rimbey | Rimbey Church of the Nazarine |
| CIHS-FM | 93.5 FM | Wetaskiwin | Tag Broadcasting |
== British Columbia ==
| CHVI-FM | 88.7 FM | Campbell River | Christian Radio Spirit-FM.ca |
| CIAM-FM-11 | 98.5 FM | Vanderhoof | CIAM Media & Radio Broadcasting Association |
| CIAJ-FM | 100.7 FM | Prince Rupert | Christian Family Inspirational Radio Ministries |
| CJGY-FM-1 | 97.1 FM | Fort St. John | Golden West Broadcasting Ltd. |
| CJGY-FM-2 | 96.7 FM | Dawson Creek | Golden West Broadcasting Ltd. |
== Manitoba ==
| CHVN-FM | 95.1 FM | Winnipeg | Golden West Broadcasting |
== New Brunswick ==
| CITA-FM | 105.1 FM | Dieppe | International Harvesters for Christ Evangelistic Association |
| CIXN-FM | 96.5 FM | Fredericton | JoyFM Network |
| CJRI-FM | 104.5 FM | Fredericton | Faithway Radio Network |
| CJFY-FM | 96.5 FM | Miramichi | Miramichi Fellowship Centre |
| CJFY-FM-1 | 107.7 FM | Miramichi River Valley | Miramichi Fellowship Centre |
| CKOE-FM | 107.3 FM | Moncton | Houssen Broadcasting |
| CINB-FM | 96.1 FM | Saint John | Newsong Communications |
| CITA-FM-1 | 107.3 FM | Sussex | International Harvesters for Christ Evangelistic Association |
== Newfoundland and Labrador ==
| VOAR-6-FM | 101.1 FM | Botwood | Seventh-day Adventist Church in Newfoundland & Labrador |
| VOAR-9-FM | 105.7 FM | Corner Brook | Seventh-day Adventist Church in Newfoundland & Labrador |
| VOAR-5-FM | 102.1 FM | Deer Lake | Seventh-day Adventist Church in Newfoundland & Labrador |
| VOAR-4-FM | 89.7 FM | Gander | Seventh-day Adventist Church in Newfoundland & Labrador |
| VOAR-11-FM | 101.9 FM | Goose Bay | Seventh-day Adventist Church in Newfoundland & Labrador |
| VOAR-8-FM | 98.3 FM | Grand Falls-Windsor | Seventh-day Adventist Church in Newfoundland & Labrador |
| VOAR-3-FM | 91.7 FM | Lewisporte | Seventh-day Adventist Church in Newfoundland & Labrador |
| VOAR-2-FM | 99.5 FM | Marystown | Seventh-day Adventist Church in Newfoundland & Labrador |
| VOAR-FM | 96.7 FM | Mount Pearl | Seventh-day Adventist Church in Newfoundland & Labrador |
| VOAR-10-FM | 99.9 FM | Port aux Basques | Seventh-day Adventist Church in Newfoundland & Labrador |
| VOWR | 800 AM | St. John's | Wesley United Church |
| VOAR-7-FM | 103.3 FM | Springdale | Seventh-day Adventist Church in Newfoundland & Labrador |
| VOAR-12-FM | 102.5 FM | Wabush | Seventh-day Adventist Church in Newfoundland & Labrador |
== Nova Scotia ==
| CITA-FM-2 | 99.1 FM | Amherst | International Harvesters for Christ Evangelistic Association |
| CVCR | 101.1 FM | Aylesford | Aylesford Community Baptist Church |
| CJLU-FM | 93.9 FM | Halifax | International Harvesters for Christ Evangelistic Association |
| CIRP-FM | 94.7 FM | Halifax | City Church Halifax |
| CINU-FM | 106.3 FM | Truro | Hope FM Ministries Ltd. |
| CJLU-FM-1 | 88.3 FM | Wolfville | International Harvesters for Christ Evangelistic Association |
== Ontario ==
| CFSH-FM | 92.9 FM | Apsley | Apsley Community Chapel |
| CKJJ-FM-4 | 103.5 FM | Bancroft | United Christian Broadcasters Canada |
| CJLF-FM | 100.3 FM | Barrie | Trust Communications |
| CKJJ-FM | 102.3 FM | Belleville | United Christian Broadcasters Canada |
| CFWC-FM | 93.9 FM | Brantford | Evanov Radio Group |
| CKJJ-FM-2 | 99.9 FM | Brockville | United Christian Broadcasters Canada |
| CKGW-FM | 89.3 FM | Chatham | United Christian Broadcasters Canada |
| CKJJ-FM-1 | 100.9 FM | Cobourg | United Christian Broadcasters Canada |
| CHRI-FM-1 | 88.1 FM | Cornwall | Christian Hit Radio Inc. |
| CJTK-FM-3 | 102.5 FM | Elliot Lake | Eternacom |
| CJLF-FM-3 | 98.9 FM | Huntsville | Trust Communications |
| CGTR | Online Only | Kingston | John Christopher Sutton |
| CKJJ-FM-3 | 100.5 FM | Kingston | United Christian Broadcasters Canada |
| CJTW-FM | 93.7 FM | Kitchener | Sound of Faith Broadcasting |
| CHJX-FM | 99.9 FM | London | Sound of Faith Broadcasting |
| CJTK-FM-1 | 103.5 FM | North Bay | Eternacom |
| CJTK-FM-2 | 102.1 FM | Northeastern Manitoulin and the Islands | Eternacom |
| VF8013 | 92.3 FM | Ottawa | Fabrique de la Paroisse du Sacré-Coeur |
| CJVN-FM | 92.7 FM | Ottawa | Fiston Kalambay (OBCI) |
| CHRI-FM | 99.1 FM | Ottawa | Christian Hit Radio Inc. |
| CJLF-FM-1 | 90.1 FM | Owen Sound | Trust Communications |
| CHRI-FM-2 | 100.7 FM | Pembroke | Christian Hit Radio Inc. |
| CJLF-FM-2 | 89.3 FM | Peterborough | Trust Communications |
| VF8016 | 90.1 FM | St. Thomas | Faith Baptist Church of St. Thomas |
| CJTK-FM | 95.5 FM | Sudbury | Eternacom |
| CJOA-FM | 95.1 FM | Thunder Bay | United Christian Broadcasters Canada |
| CHIM-FM | online | Timmins | |
| CJFH-FM | 94.3 FM | Woodstock | Sound of Faith Broadcasting |
| CJAH-FM | 90.5 FM | Windsor | United Christian Broadcasters Canada |
== Prince Edward Island ==
| CIOG-FM | 91.3 FM | Charlottetown | International Harvesters for Christ Evangelistic Association |
| CIOG-FM-1 | 91.1 FM | Summerside | International Harvesters for Christ Evangelistic Association |
== Quebec ==
| RADIO | Internet | Gatineau | Radio Fréquence-Ciel |
| VF8007 | 90.1 FM | Acton Vale | Paroisse Saint-André |
| VF8017 | 104.7 FM | L'Assomption | Fabrique de la Paroisse L'Assomption |
| CION-FM-1 | 102.5 FM | Beauceville | Fondation Radio-Galilée |
| CJRF-FM | 89.5 FM | Sherbrooke (anciennement Bromptonville avant la fusion) | Fabrique de la Paroisse de Sainte-Praxède |
| CILA-FM | 88.1 FM | Cookshire | Fabrique de la Paroisse Saint-Camille-de-Cookshire |
| VF8012 | 92.3 FM | Gatineau | Fabrique de la Paroisse Saint-Joseph |
| VF8003 | 92.7 FM | La Guadeloupe | Fabrique de la Paroisse Notre-Dame-de-la-Guadeloupe |
| VF8002 | 90.9 FM | Louiseville | Paroisse Saint-Antoine-de-Padoue |
| VF8014 | 91.5 FM | Montmagny | Fabrique de la Paroisse de Saint-Mathieu |
| CIRA-FM | 91.3 FM | Montreal | Radio Ville-Marie |
| CION-FM | 90.9 FM | Quebec City | Fondation Radio-Galilée |
| VF8005 | 88.5 FM | La Patrie | Fabrique de la Paroisse de La Patrie |
| VF8006 | 89.1 FM | Piopolis | Fabrique de la Paroisse de Piopolis |
| VF8000 | 88.1 FM | Rock Forest | Fabrique de la Paroisse Saint-Roch-de-Rock-Forest |
| CHIC-FM | 88.7 FM | Rouyn-Noranda | Communications CHIC |
| CION-FM-2 | 106.7 FM | Saguenay | Fondation Radio-Galilée |
| VF8011 | 92.1 FM | Saint-Georges-Ouest | Fabrique de la Paroisse Saint-Georges |
| CHPV-FM | 103.7 FM | Scotstown | Fabrique de la Paroisse de Saint-Paul |
| VF8001 | 88.9 FM | Shawinigan | Fabrique de la Paroisse Saint-Sauveur |
| VF8015 | 90.7 FM | Shawinigan-Sud | Fabrique de la Paroisse Sainte-Jeanne-d'Arc |
| CFPP-FM | 88.1 FM | Sherbrooke | Fabrique Notre-Dame-du-Perpétuel-Secours |
| CIRA-FM-1 | 100.3 FM | Sherbrooke | Radio Ville-Marie |
| CIRA-FM-2 | 89.9 FM | Trois-Rivières | Radio Ville-Marie |
| VF8010 | 94.1 FM | La Tuque | Fabrique de la Paroisse Marie-Médiatrice |
| CIRA-FM-3 | 91.3 FM | Victoriaville | Radio Ville-Marie |
| VF8008 | 92.7 FM | Weedon | Fabrique de la Paroisse Saint-Janvier-de-Weedon |
| VF8004 | 88.1 FM | Woburn | Fabrique de la Paroisse Saint-Augustin-de-Woburn |
== Saskatchewan ==
| CIOT-FM | 104.5 FM | Nipawin | Wilderness Ministries |
| CIAM-FM-10 | 100.1 FM | Prince Albert | CIAM Media & Radio Broadcasting |
| CIUC-FM | 95.9 FM | Regina | UCB Radio Canada |
| CIHX-FM | 103.1 FM | Saskatoon | UCB Radio Canada |
| CFAQ-FM | 100.3 FM | Saskatoon | Bertor Communications |
| CJJC-FM | 98.5 FM | Yorkton | Dennis Dyck |
== Yukon ==
| CIAY-FM | 100.7 FM | Whitehorse | Bethany Church |

== Defunct stations ==
=== Manitoba ===
- Winnipeg - CFEQ (107.1 FM) - In April 2013, this station received approval for a change in format, from Christian music to classical and jazz, for various reasons. The change became effective in November 2013.

=== Ontario ===
- Candy Mountain - CJOA-1 (93.1 FM) - This rebroadcast transmitter closed in June 2004 and was deleted from the license in 2006.
- Dryden - CJIV-FM (97.3 FM) - The station ceased operations due to financial problems; its licence was cancelled at station's request on August 31, 2013.
- Godfrey - CJCE-FM (93.7 FM) Camp IAWAH Christian Youth Centre - Last license was renewed from January 1, 2009 to August 31, 2015. No license renewals for CJCE-FM had been issued since. Its unknown when the station left the air and its believed that CJCE-FM is no longer broadcasting.
- Oakville - CJYE - (1280 AM) - Ceased AM transmission in 2026, now online only as Joy Radio.
- Peterborough - CJMB-FM (90.5 FM) - The station is still broadcasting, but now with a sports and talk format; station switched from a Christian format in mid-September 2013.
- Sudbury - CKSO-FM (101.1 FM) - Although there have been no media references to the station going out of business, in the fall of 2006 two companies applied to the CRTC for new Sudbury stations on the 101.1 FM frequency. To date, CKSO-FM remains off the air.
- Timmins - CHIM-FM (102.3 FM) and its transmitters in North Bay, Iroquois Falls, Kirkland Lake, New Liskeard, Sault Ste. Marie, Elliot Lake, Chapleau, Wawa, and Kapuskasing, ON and Red Deer, AB - The CRTC denied the license renewal application for the station, and it went off the air on November 30, 2012.
- Brantford - CKPC-AM Ceased broadcast on August 4, 2023

=== Saskatchewan ===
- Caronport - CJOS-FM (92.7 FM) - This was licensed to Briercrest Bible College as a campus radio station that broadcast religious programming. The license was relinquished in 2006.

=== Alberta ===
- Lethbridge - CKVN-FM (98.1 FM) - This station was licensed to Golden West Radio. In Broadcast Decision CRTC 2014-400, Clear Sky Radio Inc. received approval from CRTC to acquire the assets of CKVN-FM and remove conditions of licence that would allow it to move away from a Christian music format. On September 1, 2014, the station changed its call letters to CKBD-FM, and on September 22, 2014 re-launched as 98.1 "The Bridge", playing modern music aimed at the 18-34 year-old demographic.

== See also ==
- Christian radio
