= 100.7 FM =

FM radio frequency

The following radio stations broadcast on FM frequency 100.7 MHz:

== Argentina ==
- Blue in Buenos Aires
- LRI310 Radiofónica in Rosario, Santa Fe
- La 100 Las Varillas in Las Varillas, Córdoba
- Pirámide in Río Cuarto, Córdoba
- Beat Radio in Cipolletti, Río Negro
- Radioactiva in El Territorio, Misiones
- Reporte in Paraná, Entre Ríos
- Sagitario in Las Lajitas, Salta
- Best in Corrientes
- Babel in Santa Rosa de Calamuchita, Córdoba
- Encuentro in Colonia Barón, La Pampa
- del Sol in Mar del Plata, Buenos Aires
- Centro in Ushuaia, Tierra del Fuego
- Ciudad de Merlo in Merlo, San Luis
- Láser in Guandacol, La Rioja
- Plenitud in Puerto Madryn, Chubut
- Fusión in San Vicente, Santa Fe
- Voces in La Plata, Buenos Aires

== Australia ==
- 2MC FM in Port Macquarie, New South Wales
- 2WOW in Sydney, New South Wales
- 3GLR in Latrobe Valley, Victoria
- FM 100.7 (Goulburn) in Goulburn, New South Wales
- Riverland Life FM in Loxton, South Australia
- Highlands FM in the Macedon Ranges, Victoria
- 4RGD in Toowoomba, Queensland
- 4RGR in Townsville, Queensland
- 4US in Rockhampton, Queensland

== Canada (Channel 264) ==
- CBFM-FM in Mistassini, Quebec
- CBFX-FM in Montreal, Quebec
- CBRE-FM in Exshaw, Alberta
- CFFA-FM in Laforge-2, Quebec
- CFNO-FM-1 in Nipigon, Ontario
- CFNO-FM-4 in Geraldton, Ontario
- CFNO-FM-8 in White River, Ontario
- CFRM-FM in Little Current, Ontario
- CHFA-4-FM in Hinton, Alberta
- CHIN-FM in Toronto, Ontario
- CHLM-FM-2 in La Sarre, Quebec
- CHRI-FM-2 in Pembroke, Ontario
- CIAJ-FM in Prince Rupert, British Columbia
- CIAY-FM in Whitehorse, Yukon
- CIGV-FM in Penticton, British Columbia
- CILG-FM in Moose Jaw, Saskatchewan
- CJHK-FM in Bridgewater, Nova Scotia
- CJLJ-FM in Williams Lake, British Columbia
- CJWA-FM-1 in Chapleau, Ontario
- CJWA-FM-3 in Wawa/Michipicoten, Ontario
- CKCC-FM in Campbell River, British Columbia
- CKNB-FM in Campbellton, New Brunswick
- CKOL-FM-1 in Madoc, Ontario
- CKRI-FM in Red Deer, Alberta
- CKUE-FM-1 in Windsor, Ontario
- VOCM-FM-1 in Clarenville, Newfoundland and Labrador

== China ==
- CNR Business Radio in Fushun
- FJMG Traffic Radio in Fujian

== India ==
- AIR FM Gold in New Delhi, Delhi

== Israel ==
- Kan Moreshet in Beersheba, Eilat and Haifa

== Indonesia ==
- Batam FM in Batam and Singapore

== Luxembourg ==
- Radio 100,7 in Luxembourg

== Mexico ==
- XHCER-FM in Cerralvo, Nuevo León
- XHFSM-FM in Puerto Vallarta, Jalisco
- XHGY-FM in Tehuacán, Puebla
- XHH-FM in Ciudad Juárez, Chihuahua
- XHHAC-FM in Ciudad Acuña, Coahuila
- XHJUA-FM in Guanajuato, Guanajuato
- XHPEM-FM in Tayoltita, Durango
- XHPMI-FM in Peñamiller, Querétaro
- XHSK-FM in Ruiz, Nayarit
- XHZPL-FM in La Paz, Baja California Sur

== Macau ==
- TDM Chinese Radio

== Philippines ==
- DZVD in Buguias, Benguet
- DWHY in Dagupan City
- DWLW in Lucena City
- DWSV in Naga City
- DWGD in Puerto Princesa City
- DYOZ in Iloilo City
- DYDR in Tacloban City
- DYPD in Ormoc City
- DXEF in Polomolok, South Cotabato
- DXDE in Tagum City
- DXDD in Ozamiz City
- DXXX in Butuan City, Agusan del Norte
- DXLX-FM in Cagayan De Oro City
- DXFJ in Tandag City

== Taiwan ==
- International Community Radio Taipei in Northern and Southern Taiwan

== United Kingdom ==
- Classic FM in Prestatyn
- Heart North East in Teesside, Middlesbrough and parts of North Yorkshire
- Heart West Midlands in Birmingham and King's Norton (South)
- Hits Radio Cambridgeshire in Cambridge
- GTFM in Cynon Valley
- Black Diamond FM in North Middleton

== United States (Channel 264) ==
- KASE in Austin, Texas
- KATJ in George, California
- KBHQ-LP in Harrison, Arkansas
- KBNH-LP in Brownsville, Texas
- KBSF-LP in Portland, Oregon
- KCAY in Enterprise, Utah
- KCGG-LP in Kansas City, Kansas
- KCIW-LP in Brookings, Oregon
- KCLA-LP in San Pedro, California
- KEAZ in Kensett, Arkansas
- KEIT-LP in Colville, Washington
- KEVQ-FM in Crosbyton, Texas
- KFBG in San Diego, California
- KFNS in Troy, Missouri
- KGBI in Omaha, Nebraska
- KGFT in Pueblo, Colorado
- KGMO in Cape Girardeau, Missouri
- KGWY in Gillette, Wyoming
- KGXX in Susanville, California
- KHAY in Ventura, California
- KHOK in Hoisington, Kansas
- KHSS in Walla Walla, Washington
- KIBG in Bigfork, Montana
- KIBS in Bishop, California
- KIKV in Sauk Centre, Minnesota
- KJAD-LP in Topeka, Kansas
- KJIK in Duncan, Arizona
- KJYL in Eagle Grove, Iowa
- KKHT in Winnie, Texas
- KKRQ in Iowa City, Iowa
- KKVT in Grand Junction, Colorado
- KKWF in Seattle, Washington
- KLBE-LP in Bismarck, North Dakota
- KLDQ in Harwood, North Dakota
- KLKF in Malin, Oregon
- KLVF in Las Vegas, New Mexico
- KLYF-LP in Coquille, Oregon
- KMGX in Bend, Oregon
- KMKV in Kihei, Hawaii
- KMLO in Lowry, South Dakota
- KMZU in Carrollton, Missouri
- KNDL in Berthold, North Dakota
- KNSH in Fort Smith, Arkansas
- KOLF-LP in Plainview, Texas
- KOLT-FM in Cheyenne, Wyoming
- KPDA in Mountain Home, Idaho
- KPDW-LP in Pharr, Texas
- KPFS-LP in Elk City, Oklahoma
- KPLU (FM) in Palacios, Texas
- KPNC in Ponca City, Oklahoma
- KPPT in Depoe Bay, Oregon
- KPRC in Salinas, California
- KPYU-LP in Old Pascua Village, Arizona
- KQRZ-LP in Hillsboro, Oregon
- KRNP in Sutherland, Nebraska
- KRWS-LP in Hardin, Montana
- KSHQ in Deerfield, Missouri
- KSLX in Scottsdale, Arizona
- KTHU in Corning, California
- KTYK in Overton, Texas
- KULL in Abilene, Texas
- KVVZ in San Rafael, California
- KWMJ in Cotulla, Texas
- KWRD in Highland Village, Texas
- KXLB in Churchill, Montana
- KXLL in Juneau, Alaska
- KXTR-LP in Stephenville, Texas
- KXXQ in Milan, New Mexico
- KXZY-LP in Waco, Texas
- KYMV in Woodruff, Utah
- KZBL in Natchitoches, Louisiana
- WAOG-LP in Aberdeen, North Carolina
- WBGQ in Bulls Gap, Tennessee
- WBIZ in Eau Claire, Wisconsin
- WBYT in Elkhart, Indiana
- WBZZ in New Kensington, Pennsylvania
- WCKF in Ashland, Alabama
- WCKP-LP in Ocala, Florida
- WCOG in Galeton, Pennsylvania
- WCYO in Irvine, Kentucky
- WDMS in Greenville, Mississippi
- WDRX-LP in Cortland, New York
- WEAM in Buena Vista, Georgia
- WEEC in Springfield, Ohio
- WEFX in Henderson, New York
- WEHR-LP in Port Saint Lucie, Florida
- WEJK-LP in Connersville, Indiana
- WFCB-LP in Ferndale, Michigan
- WFLA in Midway, Florida
- WHUD in Peekskill, New York
- WHYI in Fort Lauderdale, Florida
- WIGY-FM in Mexico, Maine
- WITL in Lansing, Michigan
- WJTQ in Pensacola, Florida
- WKKV in Racine, Wisconsin
- WKLX in Brownsville, Kentucky
- WKVU in Utica, New York
- WKWQ-LP in Beaufort, South Carolina
- WLEV in Allentown, Pennsylvania
- WLJF-LP in Greensboro, North Carolina
- WLRR in Milledgeville, Georgia
- WLVX in Westminster, Maryland
- WMGI in Terre Haute, Indiana
- WMJD in Grundy, Virginia
- WMMS in Cleveland, Ohio
- WMTX in Tampa, Florida
- WMUV in Brunswick, Georgia
- WOBE in Crystal Falls, Michigan
- WPJP-LP in Madisonville, Kentucky
- WPPP-LP in Athens, Georgia
- WQPO in Harrisonburg, Virginia
- WRDU in Rocky Mount, North Carolina
- WRES-LP in Asheville, North Carolina
- WRXQ in Coal City, Illinois
- WTGE in Baton Rouge, Louisiana
- WTHK in Wilmington, Vermont
- WTIJ-LP in Bryson City, North Carolina
- WTNP-LP in Waterville, Maine
- WUBZ-LP in Tuskegee, Alabama
- WUOH-LP in Orlando, Florida
- WUSY in Cleveland, Tennessee
- WUTQ-FM in Utica, New York
- WVBD in Fayetteville, West Virginia
- WVXL in Christiansburg, Virginia
- WWHX in Normal, Illinois
- WWON-FM in Waynesboro, Tennessee
- WWTH in Oscoda, Michigan
- WXYX in Bayamon, Puerto Rico
- WYDL in Middleton, Tennessee
- WYEZ in Andrews, South Carolina
- WZJS in Banner Elk, North Carolina
- WZLX in Boston, Massachusetts
- WZQR-LP in Bokeelia, Florida
- WZXL in Wildwood, New Jersey
