= List of radio stations in Nova Scotia =

The following is a list of radio stations in the Canadian province of Nova Scotia, as of 2024.

Call sign	Frequency	City of Licence	Owner	Format
CITA-FM-2	99.1 FM	Amherst	International Harvesters for Christ Evangelistic Association	Christian radio
CKDH-FM	101.7 FM	Amherst	Maritime Broadcasting System	country
CFTA-FM	107.9 FM	Amherst	Tantramar Community Radio Society	community radio
CFXU-FM	93.3 FM	Antigonish	St. Francis Xavier University	campus radio
CJFX-FM	98.9 FM	Antigonish	Atlantic Broadcasters	adult contemporary
CJLS-FM-2	96.3 FM	Barrington	Acadia Broadcasting	adult contemporary
CBIB-FM	90.1 FM	Bay St. Lawrence	CBC Radio One	public news/talk
CHSB-FM	99.3 FM	Bedford	Bedford Baptist Church	Christian radio
CKBW-FM	98.1 FM	Bridgewater	Acadia Broadcasting	classic hits
CJHK-FM	100.7 FM	Bridgewater	Acadia Broadcasting	country
VOAR-13-FM	107.1 FM	Bridgewater	The Seventh-day Adventist Church in Newfoundland & Labrador	Christian radio
CIYR-FM	93.7 FM	Chapel Island	Potlotek First Nation	First Nations community radio
CBAF-FM-13	103.9 FM	Chéticamp	Ici Radio-Canada Première	public news/talk (French)
CKJM-FM	106.1 FM	Chéticamp	La Cooperative Radio-Chéticamp	community radio (French)
CBIC-FM	107.1 FM	Chéticamp	CBC Radio One	public news/talk
CIFA-FM	104.1 FM	Comeauville	Association Radio Clare	community radio (French)
CKDY-FM	99.7 FM	Digby	Maritime Broadcasting System	country
CBAF-FM-7	104.7 FM	Digby	Ici Radio-Canada Première	public news/talk (French)
CBHA-FM-1	107.1 FM	Digby	CBC Radio One	public news/talk
CFEP-FM	105.9 FM	Eastern Passage	Seaside Broadcasting	community radio
CICU-FM	94.1 FM	Eskasoni First Nation	Greg Johnson	First Nations community radio
CKOA-FM	89.7 FM	Glace Bay	Coastal Community Radio Cooperative	community radio
CKDU-FM	88.1 FM	Halifax	Dalhousie University	campus radio
CHNS-FM	89.9 FM	Halifax	Maritime Broadcasting System	classic hits
CBHA-FM	90.5 FM	Halifax	CBC Radio One	public news/talk
CBAX-FM	91.5 FM	Halifax	Ici Musique	public music (French)
CBAF-FM-5	92.3 FM	Halifax	Ici Radio-Canada Première	public news/talk (French)
CFLT-FM	92.9 FM	Halifax	Rogers Radio	adult hits
CJLU-FM	93.9 FM	Halifax	International Harvesters for Christ Evangelistic Association	Christian radio
CIRP-FM	94.7 FM	Halifax	City Church Halifax	Christian radio
CKUL-FM	96.5 FM	Halifax	Stingray Digital	adult contemporary
CKRH-FM	98.5 FM	Halifax	C médias	community radio (French)
CHHU-FM	99.1 FM	Halifax	Antoine Karam (OBCI)	multilingual
CIOO-FM	100.1 FM	Halifax	Bell Media Radio	adult contemporary
CJCH-FM	101.3 FM	Halifax	Bell Media Radio	contemporary hit radio
CHFX-FM	101.9 FM	Halifax	Maritime Broadcasting System	country
CBH-FM	102.7 FM	Halifax	CBC Music	public music
CKHZ-FM	103.5 FM	Halifax	Acadia Broadcasting	country
CFRQ-FM	104.3 FM	Halifax	Stingray Digital	active rock
CKHY-FM	105.1 FM	Halifax	Acadia Broadcasting	modern rock
CKVE-FM	88.7 FM	Hubbards	Hubbards Radio Society	community radio
CBIC-FM	94.3 FM	Inverness	CBC Radio One	public news/talk
CJFX-FM-1	102.5 FM	Inverness	Atlantic Broadcasters	adult contemporary
CIJK-FM	89.3 FM	Kentville	Stingray Digital	classic hits
CKWM-FM	94.9 FM	Kentville	Maritime Broadcasting System	adult contemporary
CKEN-FM	97.7 FM	Kentville	Maritime Broadcasting System	country
CKBW-FM-1	94.5 FM	Liverpool	Acadia Broadcasting	classic hits
CBHL-FM	97.1 FM	Liverpool	CBC Radio One	public news/talk
CJQC-FM	99.3 FM	Liverpool	Queens County Community Radio	community radio
CIOE-FM	97.5 FM	Lower Sackville	Cobequid Radio Society	community radio
CFLB-FM	107.9 FM	Lunenburg	James Scott Clements (OBCI)	active rock
CBAF-FM-12	92.3 FM	Margaree	Ici Radio-Canada Première	public news/talk (French)
CHLU-FM	93.7 FM	Middle LaHave	CHLU-FM Inc.	classic hits
CKAD	1350 AM	Middleton	Maritime Broadcasting System	country
CJIJ-FM	99.9 FM	Membertou	Peter Christmas	First Nations community radio
CBH-FM-1	93.3 FM	Middleton	CBC Music	public music
CBHM-FM	106.5 FM	Middleton	CBC Radio One	public news/talk
CBAF-FM-6	107.5 FM	Middleton	Ici Radio-Canada Première	public news/talk (French)
CBH-FM-2	103.1 FM	Mulgrave	CBC Music	public music
CBHB-FM	106.7 FM	Mulgrave	CBC Radio One	public news/talk
CBAF-FM-11	107.5 FM	Mulgrave	Ici Radio-Canada Première	public news/talk (French)
CBAF-FM-10	88.7 FM	New Glasgow	Ici Radio-Canada Première	public news/talk (French)
CBHN-FM	89.5 FM	New Glasgow	CBC Radio One	public news/talk
CKEC-FM	94.1 FM	New Glasgow	Stingray Digital	adult contemporary
CKEZ-FM	97.9 FM	New Glasgow	Stingray Digital	classic/active rock
CJLS-FM-1	93.5 FM	New Tusket	Acadia Broadcasting	adult contemporary
CBHF-FM	93.9 FM	Northeast Margaree	CBC Radio One	public news/talk
CICR-FM	99.1 FM	Parrsboro	Parrsboro Radio Society	community radio
CITU-FM	104.1 FM	Petit-de-Grat	La Co-opérative Radio Richmond limitée	community radio (French)
CKJM-FM-1	92.5 FM	Pomquet	La Cooperative Radio-Chéticamp	community radio (French)
CIGO-FM	101.5 FM	Port Hawkesbury	Acadia Broadcasting	contemporary hit radio
CKBW-FM-2	93.1 FM	Shelburne	Acadia Broadcasting	classic hits
CBAP-FM	100.3 FM	Shelburne	CBC Radio One	public news/talk
CBAZ-FM	97.3 FM	Sheet Harbour	CBC Radio One	public news/talk
CIPU-FM	97.1 FM	Sipekneꞌkatik First Nation	Shubie FM Radio	First Nations community radio
CIRP-FM	94.7 FM	Spryfield	City Church Halifax	Christian radio
CBI	1140 AM	Sydney	CBC Radio One	public news/talk
CJCB	1270 AM	Sydney	Maritime Broadcasting System	country
CBIS-FM	92.1 FM	Sydney	CBC Radio One	public news/talk
CKPE-FM	94.9 FM	Sydney	Maritime Broadcasting System	classic hits
CBAF-FM-14	95.9 FM	Sydney	Ici Radio-Canada Première	public news/talk (French)
CKJM-FM-2	97.5 FM	Sydney	La Cooperative Radio-Chéticamp	community radio (French)
CHER-FM	98.3 FM	Sydney	Maritime Broadcasting System	classic rock
CHRK-FM	101.9 FM	Sydney	Stingray Digital	contemporary hit radio
CKCH-FM	103.5 FM	Sydney	Stingray Digital	country
CBI-FM	105.1 FM	Sydney	CBC Music	public music
CJBU-FM	107.3 FM	Sydney	Caper Radio (Cape Breton University)	campus radio
CBHC-FM	89.1 FM	Truro	CBC Radio One	public news/talk
CINU-FM	106.3 FM	Truro	Hope FM Ministries	Christian radio
CKTY-FM	99.5 FM	Truro	Maritime Broadcasting System	country
CKTO-FM	100.9 FM	Truro	Maritime Broadcasting System	classic hits
CBAF-FM-8	100.9 FM	Weymouth	Ici Radio-Canada Première	public news/talk (French)
CKDY-1-FM	103.3 FM	Weymouth	Maritime Broadcasting System	country
CFAB	1450 AM	Windsor	Maritime Broadcasting System	country
CJLU-FM-1	88.3 FM	Wolfville	International Harvesters for Christ Evangelistic Association	Christian radio
CBHY-FM	92.1 FM	Yarmouth	CBC Radio One	public news/talk
CJLS-FM; CJLS-FM-3	95.5 FM; 94.7 FM	Yarmouth	Acadia Broadcasting	adult contemporary
CBAX-FM-3	106.1 FM	Yarmouth	Ici Musique	public music (French)
CBAF-FM-9	107.3 FM	Yarmouth	Ici Radio-Canada Première	public news/talk (French)

== See also ==
- Lists of radio stations in North and Central America
