= Canadian Christian Radio Chart =

The CCRC, which stand for Canadian Christian Radio Chart, is a Canadian record chart compiled and published by Ten16 Entertainment. The chart currently tracks the top 30 songs of the week according to airplay on twelve Canadian Christian radio stations. A year-end chart with 100 position is also compiled. Radio stations can subscribe via its web site to have the chart e-mailed to them every Monday morning. Its web site also lists the current week's chart, but does not currently archive charts for past weeks, as well it lists the year-end carts from 2012 to 2015. The CCRC has been around since at least February 2, 2013.

== Tracked stations ==
- CJSI-FM
- CJRY-FM
- CJGY-FM
- CJTW-FM
- CINB-FM
- CKGW-FM
- CHRI-FM
- CJLF-FM
- CKJJ-FM
- CJFY-FM
- CJJC-FM
- Stingray Music

== See also ==
- Christian radio
- CT-20
