= CCRC =

CCRC may refer to:

- California Citizens Redistricting Commission
- Canadian Children's Rights Council, men's rights organization founded 1991
- Canadian Coalition for the Rights of Children, children's rights organization founded 1989
- Canadian Christian Radio Chart
- Capital College and Research Centre, Nepal
- City of Cambridge Rowing Club
- ClearCase Remote Client, a feature of IBM Rational ClearCase
- Climate Change Research Centre
- Community College Research Center
- Continuing care retirement communities
- Crimes against Children Research Center, directed by David Finkelhor
- Criminal Cases Review Commission, in England, Wales and Northern Ireland
- Scottish Criminal Cases Review Commission
