= CKEN =

CKEN may refer to:

- CKEN-FM, a radio station (97.7 FM) licensed to Kentville, Nova Scotia, Canada
- CKWM-FM, a radio station (94.9 FM) licensed to Kentville, Nova Scotia, Canada, which held the call sign CKEN-FM from 1965 to c. 1970
