= CIRP =

CIRP may refer to:

- CIRP-FM (94.7 MHz), a non-profit radio station serving the Halifax, Nova Scotia market
- Centre d'instruction des réserves parachutistes
- Colombo Institute of Research & Psychology, Sri Lanka
- Corporate Insolvency Resolution Process; see Insolvency and Bankruptcy Code, 2016 § Procedure
- Higher Education Research Institute
- International Academy for Production Engineering
