= CION-FM (Rivière-du-Loup, Quebec) =

Former radio station in Rivière-du-Loup, Quebec, Canada

- Rivière-du-Loup, Quebec; Canada
- Frequency: 103.7 MHz

Programming
- Language: French

Ownership
- Owner: Communications communautaires des Portages

History
- First air date: September 1982
- Last air date: September 30, 1987

CION-FM was a French language radio station that operated on 103.7 MHz/FM in Rivière-du-Loup, Quebec, Canada.

The station was unrelated to the current CION-FM in Quebec City.

== History ==
=== CION-FM under Des Portages ===
In 1980, the CRTC denied an application to Communications communautaires des Portages ("Des Portages") for a community FM station at Rivière-du-Loup. If the application was approved, the station would have broadcast on 103.7 MHz with an effective radiated power of 60,000 watts. However, the CRTC would later look at Des Portages's application for a Class A channel at 103.7, instead of the proposed Class C frequency. On December 7, 1981, Des Portages was granted a licence for a new community FM station on 103.7 MHz with an effective radiated power of 60,000 watts.

CION-FM signed on the air in September 1982.

On September 17, 1987, the CRTC denied the application to renew the licence for CION-FM, due to serious and persistent compliance difficulties following numerous warnings by the CRTC, in regards to being in breach of the license's conditions in regards to quotas in music, spoken word content, and advertising restrictions, in addition to interventions by other area broadcasters due to unfair competition. The station was ordered to cease operation no later than September 30, 1987 the date on which its licence did expire and left the air.

=== CION-FM under CION-FM, Inc. ===
On November 4, 1988, the CRTC approved an application by another licensee, CION-FM Inc. to resume the operation of CION-FM, as a commercial French-language station, using the same facilities and parameters as the former station.

On March 14, 1990, the CRTC denied CION-FM's application to change its transmitter site from its then-current site on Mont Bleu on the South Shore of the St. Lawrence River, to Mont Grand-Fonds near La Malbaie on the North Shore. Six other broadcasters opposed the move, again, due to unfair competition that would reduce the potential audience on the south shore.

The new station was given until August 31, 1991 to go on the air. Despite delays in a federal court case that was settled in favour of CION, the station never commenced broadcasting; the broadcaster instead opted to have its licence revoked instead, which was granted on August 20, 1991.
