= CFAB =

CFAB may refer to:

- CFAB (AM), radio station in Windsor, Nova Scotia, Canada
- Children and Families Across Borders, a British charity
