= CJLS-FM =

Radio station in Yarmouth, Nova Scotia

Coordinates: 43°52′42″N 65°58′12″W

- Yarmouth, Nova Scotia; Canada
- Broadcast area: Yarmouth, New Tusket, Barrington
- Frequency: 95.5 MHz
- Branding: Y95

Programming
- Format: Classic hits

Ownership
- Owner: Acadia Broadcasting

History
- First air date: April 1, 1934
- Former frequencies: 1340 kHz (1968–2002)

Technical information
- Class: B1
- ERP: 18,000 watts horizontal polarization only
- HAAT: 75.9 metres (249 ft)

Links
- Webcast: Listen Live
- Website: yourtricounties.ca

CJLS-FM is a Canadian radio station broadcasting at 95.5 FM in Yarmouth, Nova Scotia. The station uses the on-air brand name Y95. The station currently airs a classic hits format and is owned by Acadia Broadcasting Limited. The station was one of the first radio stations in the Maritimes.

== History ==
CJLS was founded by Laurie Smith in 1934. Leland G. Trask purchased the company from the Smith Family in 1968. In 1998, Gerry Boudreau, Chris Perry and Ray Zinck, all former employees of CJLS purchased CJLS.

In 1984, CJLS added FM repeaters at Barrington Passage (96.3 MHz at 5,500 watts) and New Tusket (93.5 MHz at 3,000 watts).

For years, CJLS was carried at 1340 kHz on the AM band until the switch to FM after receiving CRTC approval in 2002. The formal changeover from AM to FM took place in June 2003.

In 2004, CJLS was given approval to operate a low-power rebroadcast transmitter in Yarmouth to resolve signal deficiencies caused by rough terrain surrounding the 95.5 FM transmitter located in Tusket Falls. The rebroadcaster began operating on 94.7 MHz with effective radiated power of 50 watts.

In April 2016, the station was sold to Acadia Broadcasting.

As of September 16, 2016, CJLS rebranded from The Wave to Y95.

In 2020, the station changed their format to Classic Hits.

== Rebroadcasters ==
City of licence	Identifier	Frequency	RECNet	CRTC Decision
New Tusket	CJLS-FM-1	93.5 FM	Query	84-218
Barrington	CJLS-FM-2	96.3 FM	Query	84-218
Yarmouth	CJLS-FM-3	94.7 FM	Query	2004-544

== See also ==
- List of radio stations in Nova Scotia
