= KCLA =

KCLA may refer to:

- KCLA-LP, a low-power radio station (100.7 FM) licensed to serve San Pedro, California, United States
- KCLA (defunct), a defunct radio station (1400 AM) formerly licensed to serve Pine Bluff, Arkansas, United States
