= XHPMI-FM =

Radio station in Peñamiller, Querétaro

Peñamiller, Querétaro; Mexico
- Frequency: 100.7 FM
- Branding: Radiomiller

Ownership
- Owner: Radio Cultural de Villa del Carbón, A.C.

History
- First air date: December 2018
- Call sign meaning: PeñaMIller

Technical information
- Class: A
- ERP: 2.77 kW
- HAAT: -284.9 meters
- Transmitter coordinates: 21°03′29.74″N 99°49′01.75″W

Links
- Website: www.radiomiller.com.mx

XHPMI-FM is a radio station on 100.7 FM in Peñamiller, Querétaro. The station is owned by the civil association Radio Cultural de Villa del Carbón, A.C.

== History ==
Radio Cultural de Villa del Carbón filed for a radio station permit on July 29, 2013. The station was awarded on May 23, 2018. Test transmissions began in December 2018, bringing Peñamiller its first-ever legal radio service.
