= XHZPL-FM =

Radio station in La Paz, Baja California Sur, Mexico

- La Paz, Baja California Sur; Mexico
- Broadcast area: La Paz
- Frequency: 100.7 FM
- Branding: Estéreo Romance

Programming
- Format: Romantic

Ownership
- Owner: Promomedios California; (María Regina de la Peza Barrios)

History
- First air date: February 26, 1996 (concession)
- Call sign meaning: Anagram of La Paz

Technical information
- Licensing authority: CRT
- Class: A
- ERP: 3 kW
- HAAT: 104.10 m
- Transmitter coordinates: 24°07′51.3″N 110°16′39.5″W

Links
- Webcast: Listen live
- Website: estereoromance.com

XHZPL-FM is a radio station in La Paz, Baja California Sur, Mexico.
