= CJLI =

Christian radio station in Calgary

Coordinates: 51.013061°N 114.065104°W

- Calgary, Alberta; Canada
- Broadcast area: Calgary Metropolitan Region
- Frequency: 700 kHz
- Branding: AM 700 The Light

Programming
- Format: Christian

Ownership
- Owner: Touch Canada Broadcasting
- Sister stations: CJCA

History
- First air date: June 29, 2015
- Call sign meaning: Christ Jesus Light

Technical information
- Class: B
- Power: 50 kWs daytime 20 kWs nighttime

Links
- Website: www.amthelight.com

CJLI (AM 700 The Light) is a Canadian radio station, that broadcasts a Christian format on 700 kHz/AM in Calgary, Alberta. The station is licensed to broadcast with 50,000 watts during the day and 20,000 watts at night, with additional restrictions to protect Class A clear-channel stations WLW in Cincinnati, Ohio and KBYR in Anchorage, Alaska.

AM 700 The Light's plays spoken word programming talking about what matters in Calgary and surrounding areas. AM 700 has 4 brother stations: Shine FM Calgary CJSI-FM, Shine FM Edmonton CJRY-FM and 90.5 Shine FM Red Deer CKRD-FM. Along with AM 930 The Light in Edmonton CJCA-AM. AM 700 The Light broadcasts from the heart of Calgary downtown on 17th avenue SW.

Owned by Touch Canada Broadcasting, the station received CRTC approval on April 24, 2009. The station planned to broadcast from a transmitter site from the Black Diamond area southwest of Calgary, but was unable to secure a site, due to local opposition. In November 2013, the station acquired a site north of Black Diamond, in hopes of broadcasting from there.

On June 29, 2015, Touch Canada Broadcasting launched CJLI, branded as AM 700, The Light.
