= Clever Hopes =

Canadian rock band

Clever Hopes is a Canadian alternative country and folk rock band based in Dartmouth, Nova Scotia, whose core member is singer-songwriter Andrew Shaver.

Originally from Toronto, Ontario, Shaver is also an actor and theatre director, best known for his supporting role as David Rizzio in the fourth season of the television series Reign, and has been a radio host on CKVE-FM and CFLB-FM.

He formed the band after spending some time in Australia following the end of a romantic relationship. After returning to Canada, he asked Eva Foote, whom he had first met when he directed her in a production of the musical Once, to collaborate on recording songs for the band's 2022 debut album Artefact. The album was produced and mixed by Matthew Barber, and featured guest contributions by Noah Reid and Justin Rutledge.

He followed up with the album New Kind of Familiar in 2024. Again produced by Barber, the album featured contributions by Foote, Kyle Cunjak, Joshua Van Tassel, Joe Grass, Daniel Ledwell and Afie Jurvanen.
