= Sound of Faith Broadcasting =

Sound of Faith Broadcasting Inc. is a Canadian Christian broadcasting group, which owns 3 radio stations in southern Ontario, Canada. Originally based in Woodstock, Ontario, the head office is now located in Kitchener, Ontario at 24 McIntyre Place. The ministry was founded around 2000, and launched its first radio station in 2003. Sound of Faith had plans to have a network of Christian radio stations across the province. On August 31, 2017 Sound of Faith Broadcasting Inc. sold their interests in the Brantford Station to Dufferin Radio Group.

== Station brandings ==
The stations owned by Sound of Faith Broadcasting are branded as "Faith FM" (London and Kitchener) and "Hope FM" (Woodstock).

== Stations ==
=== Ontario ===
- CHJX-FM - London
- CJFH-FM - Woodstock
- CJTW-FM - Kitchener

== See also ==
- Christian radio
- CT-20
- Religious broadcasting
- List of religious radio stations
