= CKVE-FM =

Radio station in Halifax, Nova Scotia

Coordinates: 44.5253°N 64.0864°W

- Halifax, Nova Scotia; Canada
- Broadcast area: Halifax metropolitan area
- Frequency: 88.7 MHz
- Branding: Cove FM

Programming
- Format: Community radio

Ownership
- Owner: Hubbards Radio Society; (Hubbards Radio Society)

History
- First air date: February 8, 2016
- Call sign meaning: Cove-FM

Technical information
- Licensing authority: CRTC
- ERP: 1,080 watts
- HAAT: 150 metres (490 ft)

Links
- Webcast: Listen live
- Website: covefm.com

CKVE-FM is a Canadian radio station broadcasting at 88.7 FM in Halifax, Nova Scotia. It is owned by Hubbards Radio Society and airs a community radio radio format. CKVE uses the on-air brand name 88.7 Cove FM.

== History ==
On May 28, 2014, Hubbards Radio Society filed an application for a broadcasting license to operate an English-language community FM radio station in Hubbards, Nova Scotia, using 88.7 MHz (channel 204A1) with an effective radiated power (ERP) of 1,080 watts (non-directional antenna with an effective height above average terrain (EHAAT) of 150 meters). The application was accepted and they began airing on February 8, 2016.

The station formerly aired When We Wake, a weekly show hosted by actor and musician Andrew Shaver profiling Canadian independent musicians.
