= CHJX-FM =

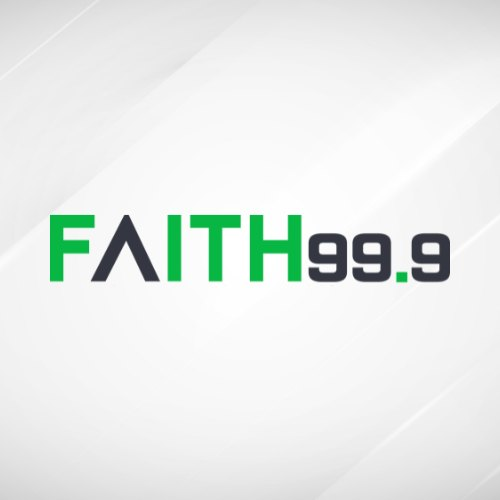
- London, Ontario; Canada
- Frequency: 99.9 MHz
- Branding: Faith 99.9

Programming
- Format: Christian music

Ownership
- Owner: Sound of Faith Broadcasting Inc.

History
- Call sign meaning: Christ Jesus X (cross)

Technical information
- Licensing authority: CRTC
- Class: A
- ERP: 500 watts
- HAAT: 107.5 metres (353 ft)
- Transmitter coordinates: 42.98573°N 81.24659°W

Links
- Website: faith999.ca

CHJX-FM (99.9 MHz) is a Canadian radio station in London, Ontario, airing a Christian music format branded as Faith 99.9 (ninety-nine nine). It switches to Christmas music for much of December. In addition, it carries several Christian talk and teaching shows including Alistair Begg, J. Vernon McGee, Chuck Swindoll, John MacArthur, David Jeremiah and Focus on the Family. CHJX-FM has an effective radiated power (ERP) of 500 watts.

Formerly branded as "Grace FM," "Inspire FM," and later "Faith FM," CHJX is owned by Sound of Faith Broadcasting, with sister stations in Kitchener and Woodstock. Faith 99.9 is listener-supported and depends upon both local advertising and listener donations to fund its operations.

== History ==
=== 105.9 FM ===
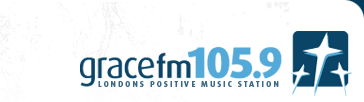
CHJX-FM's logo when it was launched as Grace FM in 2004.

Sound of Faith Broadcasting received Canadian Radio-television and Telecommunications Commission (CRTC) approval for operations on December 9, 2002. It originally had an effective radiated power of 10 watts and broadcast at 106.9 MHz. The CRTC got 186 letters of support of the application.

CHJX-FM began on-air testing in February 2004. After fundraising, the station began broadcasting from studios at 100 Fullarton Street. Its transmitter was atop One London Place.

In 2006 Sound of Faith Broadcasting applied for a frequency change for CHJX-FM from 105.9 FM to 98.1 FM. Despite support for the change from listeners and other stations, the CRTC denied the application.

CHJX-FM studios were moved in 2008 to the upper floors of Youth for Christ (YFC) London located at 254 Adelaide Street South. The station called itself "Grace FM."

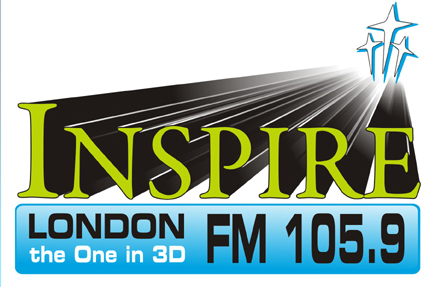
CHJX-FM's logo as Inspire FM circa 2011.

On July 5, 2010, it rebranded as "Inspire FM." launching a new site Despite the change in its moniker, it kept the same Christian format.

=== 99.9 FM ===
In August 2012, Sound of Faith Broadcasting got approval to broadcast on a new frequency, 99.9 MHz. The station switched to 99.9 on August 31, 2012. The new frequency had an effective radiated power of 500 watts with a directional antenna system primarily towards the east to protect other stations that broadcast on or near 99.9 MHz, including CFGX-FM in Sarnia, CKFM-FM in Toronto, WKKO in Toledo, Ohio and possibly WXKC in Erie, Pennsylvania.

In October 2012, CHJX changed its branding to "Faith FM" with a new tagline, "your inspiration station." The staff moved their offices soon after to 100 Wellington Street in South London.

CHJX-FM's logo as Faith FM circa 2018.

In June 2022, CHJX changed its branding to "Faith 99.9," launching a new website, logo and tagline "Your friendly voice of hope."
