= CIYR-FM =

First Nations community radio station in Potlotek, Nova Scotia

- Chapel Island 5, Nova Scotia; Canada
- Frequency: 93.7 MHz
- Branding: Mniku Radio

Programming
- Format: Community radio

Ownership
- Owner: Potlotek Communication Society

History
- First air date: August 2018

Technical information
- Class: LP
- ERP: 45 watts
- HAAT: 26.8 m

Links
- Website: Official website

CIYR-FM is a Canadian radio station, broadcasting at 93.7 FM serving the Potlotek First Nation, Nova Scotia. The station broadcasts a First Nations-oriented community radio format branded as Mniku Radio.

The station was licensed by the Canadian Radio-television and Telecommunications Commission on November 17, 2017, and launched in August 2018.

The station produces programming in both English and Mi'kmaq. As part of efforts to preserve the endangered Mi'kmaq language, its Mi'kmaq programming includes daily "word of the day" and "phrase of the day" educational features. The name "Mniku" means "island" in Mi'kmaq, and refers to Chapel Island in the Potlotek First Nation's territory.
