= KPFS-LP =

- Elk City, Oklahoma; United States
- Broadcast area: Elk City, Oklahoma
- Frequency: 100.7 MHz
- Branding: Oklahoma Catholic Broadcasting

Programming
- Format: Catholic Religious

Ownership
- Owner: Western Oklahoma Catholic Faith Foundation

History
- First air date: 2015

Technical information
- Licensing authority: FCC
- Facility ID: 195690
- Class: LP1
- ERP: 100 watts
- HAAT: 25.8 meters (85 ft)
- Transmitter coordinates: 35°25′22″N 99°22′2″W

Links
- Public license information: LMS
- Website: http://www.okcr.org

KPFS-LP (100.7 FM) is a low-power FM radio station licensed to Elk City, Oklahoma, United States. The station is currently owned by Western Oklahoma Catholic Faith Foundation

== History ==
The station call sign KPFS-LP on February 28, 2014.
