= DXEF =

General Santos; Philippines
- Broadcast area: South Cotabato, Sarangani and surrounding areas
- Frequency: 100.7 MHz

Programming
- Format: Silent

Ownership
- Owner: People's Broadcasting Service, Inc.

History
- First air date: 1988
- Last air date: 2024
- Former names: The Gentle Wind (1988–1994); Star FM (1994–2010); Feel FM (2022-2024)
- Call sign meaning: Elena Florete

Technical information
- Licensing authority: NTC

DXEF (100.7 FM) was a radio station owned by People's Broadcasting Service.

The station was formerly under Bombo Radyo Philippines. It was known as The Gentle Wind from 1988 to 1994 and Star FM from 1994 to 2010, when it went off the air. Back then, it was located in Brgy. Bula, General Santos. Feel FM based in Polomolok used to broadcast on this frequency from October 2022 to late 2024.
