= Wow FM (Penrith) =

Australian community radio station

Coordinates: 33.7683°S 150.7734°E

Wow FM 100.7
- Penrith, New South Wales; Australia
- Frequency: 100.7 MHz

Programming
- Format: Community radio

Ownership
- Owner: Way Out West Fine Music Inc.

History
- First air date: June 2001
- Last air date: September 2025
- Call sign meaning: "Way Out West"

Technical information
- ERP: 200 watts

Links
- Webcast: Listen Live
- Website: Official website

Wow FM (100.7 FM, call sign 2WOW) was a community radio station based in St Marys in Sydney. The station broadcast to part of Western Sydney, mainly centered on the City of Penrith. Wow FM was a volunteer-run organisation and was funded through listener support, grants and limited commercial sponsorship.

== Programming ==
WOW FM's programs covered different music styles on an ad-hoc basis, including adult contemporary, rock and roll, country, multicultural and Christian programming,. Wow FM also broadcast programs that were presented by special interest groups or in languages other than English.

The station encouraged all listeners to become members and to volunteer to present programs of interest to the community

== History ==
In June 2001, "Way Out West (WOW) FM" beat one other radio station for a permanent license from the Australian Broadcasting Authority. This was due to the perceived need for multicultural programs in the Penrith area, which WOW FM devoted a large proportion of their airtime, although only 10% of Penrith LGA residents come from a non-English-speaking background.

In November 2001, WOW FM began broadcasting national news updates produced in Bathurst by media students at Charles Sturt University.

WOW FM added a "Kids Club" feature that allows local primary school students to learn about radio broadcasting and promote their schools. The station joined the "Work for the Dole" project by giving thirty unemployed young people the chance to study interviewing, computer skills, and Internet broadcasting, and introduced new programs for refugees that have moved into the listening area.

In September 2025, WOW FM ran out of money and had appointed liquidators, and began shutting down operations after 24 years of permanent broadcasting to the Penrith region. In a statement, Mark Gould, who hosted his Rock and Roll Party Show program on WOW FM, said:

Radio station WOW-FM 100.7 at St. Marys has been the community station for the Nepean Valley and Lower Blue Mountains for many years. Sadly, the station is no longer able to meet its financial obligations and has appointed liquidators. This development has come as a shock to its presenters, all of whom have lost their shows. It has, of course, also impacted my own Saturday Night Rock and Roll Party Show, which will no longer be heard on WOW-FM.

I have been on community radio for 42 years, including 23 years at WOW-FM. It's been a great ride for me. I have so many fantastic memories that will stay with me for the rest of my life. To all my local, interstate and overseas listeners, and to all my helpers, I sincerely thank you for your friendship, loyalty, and your great requests over such a very long period of time. I will miss you, and I will not forget you.

== See also ==
- List of radio stations in Australia
