= Canadian Coalition for the Rights of Children =

Canadian children's rights advocacy group

- Abbreviation: CCRC
- Formation: 1989
- Type: NGO
- Legal status: Coalition
- Purpose: To advocate for children's rights
- Location: Canada
- Region served: Canada
- Official language: English
- Board of directors: Hala Mreiwed & Terence Hamilton (Co-Chairs)
- Affiliations: UNICEF Canada; YOUCAN
- Website: rightsofchildren.ca

The Canadian Coalition for the Rights of Children (CCRC) is one of Canada's foremost national children's rights advocacy groups, dating back to 1989. The coalition consists of more than fifty non-governmental organizations.

In 1991, the Canadian Children's Rights Council adopted the same acronym as the coalition. The CCRC released a report in 1999 called "How Does Canada Measure Up?" which criticized the way children were treated in the country, specifically focusing on children with disabilities. In 2003, the Government of Canada consulted the CCRC on the country's adherence to the United Nations Convention on the Rights of the Child (CRC). The CCRC published a shortened version of the CRC and disseminated it among Canadian youth in order to promote this international human rights instrument.

The CCRC hosted a forum called "Children: Silenced Citizens?" in 2007 to discuss the CRC. The CCRC submitted a plea on behalf of Omar Khadr in the 2009 legal case Prime Minister of Canada et al. v. Omar Ahmed Khadr. Also on 2009, the organization established a Child Rights Award.

In 2010, the CCRC collaborated with YOUCAN and UNICEF Canada to produce a brochure to inform Canadian youth about the Optional Protocol on the Involvement of Children in Armed Conflict.

In 2011, the CCRC submitted a report called "Right in Principle, Right in Practice" to the Committee on the Rights of the Child, making recommendations about how to improve Canadian public policy regarding children's rights. The report also stated that the Canadian government's implementation of the CRC over previous two decades has been sporadic at best.

In 2018, the group advocated for a pollution tax on behalf of Canadian children and joined Gen Squeeze coalition that aimed to get intervenor status in two court cases that the provinces of Ontario and Saskatchewan have filed challenging the federal government's legal authority to impose a carbon tax.
