= CFLB-FM =

Radio station in Lunenburg, Nova Scotia

- Lunenburg, Nova Scotia; Canada
- Frequency: 107.9 MHz
- Branding: Go Rock

Programming
- Format: active rock

Ownership
- Owner: James Scott Clements (OBCI)

History
- First air date: July 31, 2024
- Call sign meaning: Lunenburg

Technical information
- Class: B1
- ERP: 6,500 watts
- HAAT: 74.6 metres

Links
- Website: www.gorock.ca

CFLB-FM, branded as 107.9 GO Rock, is a Canadian radio station that broadcasts an active rock format at 107.9 MHz FM in Lunenburg, Nova Scotia.

== History ==
Owned by James Scott Clements, on behalf of a corporation to be incorporated, the station received Canadian Radio-television and Telecommunications Commission (CRTC) approval on August 29, 2023 for a new FM radio licence to operate at Lunenburg, Nova Scotia on the frequency of 107.9 MHz (channel 300B1) with an effective radiated power (ERP) of 6,500 watts (non-directional antenna with an effective height of antenna above average terrain (EHAAT) of 74.6 metres).

The station was officially launched with an active rock format as 107.9 Go Rock on July 31, 2024. Its inaugural program schedule included Andrew's Night Shift, a program hosted by actor and musician Andrew Shaver.

The station serves rock music fans in Lunenburg, Bridgewater, Mahone Bay and beyond.
