= KJYL =

Kinship Christian Radio station in Eagle Grove–Fort Dodge, Iowa

- Eagle Grove, Iowa; United States
- Broadcast area: Fort Dodge, Iowa
- Frequency: 100.7 MHz
- Branding: Kinship Christian Radio

Programming
- Format: Christian Radio

Ownership
- Owner: Minn-Iowa Christian Broadcasting, Inc.

History
- First air date: February 20, 1994
- Call sign meaning: Know Jesus Your Lord

Technical information
- Licensing authority: FCC
- Facility ID: 42894
- Class: C3
- ERP: 25,000 watts
- HAAT: 100 meters (330 ft)
- Transmitter coordinates: 42°39′18″N 93°59′24″W

Links
- Public license information: Public file; LMS
- Webcast: Listen live
- Website: kinshipradio.org/home/

KJYL is a Christian radio station licensed to Eagle Grove, Iowa, broadcasting on 100.7 MHz. KJYL serves the Fort Dodge, Iowa area. The station is owned by Minn-Iowa Christian Broadcasting, Inc.

== Translators ==
KJYL is also heard locally in Newell, Iowa, through a translator on 96.3 FM.

Call sign	Frequency	City of license	FID	ERP (W)	Class	FCC info
K242AM	96.3 FM	Newell, Iowa	24610	250	D	LMS
