= KHSS =

- Athena, Oregon; United States
- Frequency: 100.7 MHz (HD Radio)
- Branding: Global Catholic Radio

Programming
- Format: FM/HD1: Catholic Religious; HD2: Classical ("KHSS2"); HD3: Talk ("KGDC2"); HD4: Silent

Ownership
- Owner: Two Hearts Communications, LLC

Technical information
- Licensing authority: FCC
- Facility ID: 34540
- Class: C2
- ERP: 6,300 watts
- HAAT: 403 meters (1,322 ft)
- Transmitter coordinates: 45°59′4″N 118°10′8″W
- Translators: 94.1 K231CT (Walla Walla, relays HD2); 102.3 K272EZ (Walla Walla, relays HD3)

Links
- Public license information: Public file; LMS
- Website: khssradio.com

KHSS (100.7 FM, "Global Catholic Radio") is a radio station broadcasting a Catholic Religious format. It is licensed to Athena, Oregon, United States. Two Hearts Communications, LLC, has been the licensee of KHSS since 1998.
