= WLRR =

- Milledgeville, Georgia; United States
- Frequency: 100.7 MHz
- Branding: Star Station 100.7

Programming
- Format: Adult standards/MOR

Ownership
- Owner: Debra Baker; (Starstation Radio, LLC)

History
- Former call signs: WPWS (1988–1990)

Technical information
- Licensing authority: FCC
- Facility ID: 53476
- Class: A
- ERP: 3,000 watts
- HAAT: 100 meters
- Transmitter coordinates: 33°6′50.00″N 83°13′8.00″W

Links
- Public license information: Public file; LMS
- Website: starstationradio.net

WLRR (100.7 FM) is a radio station broadcasting an adult standards/MOR format. Licensed to Milledgeville, Georgia, United States, the station is currently majority-owned by Craig Baker, through licensee Starstation Radio, LLC.

== History ==
The station went on the air as WPWS on 1988-02-17. on 1990-06-04, the station changed its call sign to the current WLRR.
