= Canadian Children's Rights Council =

Canadian advocacy organization

- Formation: 1991
- Type: non-profit advocacy group
- Headquarters: Toronto, Ontario, Canada
- Official language: English and French
- Website: canadiancrc.com

The Canadian Children's Rights Council Inc. (CCRC); (French: Conseil canadien des droits des enfants inc.) is a non-governmental organization that is based in Toronto, Ontario, Canada and was founded in 1991. The CCRC describe themselves as a nonprofit, educational and advocacy organization dedicated to supporting the rights and responsibilities of Canadian children and providing critical analysis of governments' policies at all levels of government in Canada.

== Activities ==
The organization researches, educates and advocates in the area of the rights and responsibilities of Canadian children. It has testified at Canadian provincial and federal committees and ministerial consultations. Specifically, the CCRC strives to advocate for children's rights by lobbying the government, intergovernmental and non-governmental agencies with research and solutions regarding violations of Canadian children's rights.

With 50 million website visits since launching in 2003, the organization states that its website is the most visited website in Canada on the issues of children's rights and responsibilities.

The CCRC offers a virtual library of books, position statements, research articles, and historical and other documents on children's issues such as bullying in Canadian schools; child abuse; universal education and health care for children; parental alienation; equal shared parenting; the Youth Criminal Justice Act; adoption and birth parent identity; paternity fraud; corporal punishment; infanticide; and child abandonment laws.

== Positions ==
The organization supports the existence of a national and provincial commissioners on the implementation of the United Nations Convention on the Rights of the Child. The group opposes corporal punishment including spanking, and promotes the idea of parent training in alternatives.

In reference to a Halifax newborn who was abandoned in a remote field, and six other Ontario babies that were simply thrown in the garbage, the group's president, Grant Wilson, has stated that women who abandon and leave their babies without the necessities of life should be charged with attempted murder..."; and that Canada's infanticide law should be repealed, as it devalues the lives of children, violates their rights, and is "a license for women to kill babies." In both cases he argues that a defense of diminished capacity could be still used in cases involving post partum depression. Wilson's rationale for this is the reality that Canadian child abandonment cases rarely result in criminal charges being laid.

Wilson has stated that women frequently make false allegations of abuse during divorce to secure custody; and that men are just as likely to be the victim of domestic violence because of such violence being underreported. He has also called for tougher penalties, including jail time, for mothers who consistently deprive their children of visitation rights with their fathers. In response to an Ontario court decision which ordered a man continue paying child-support for children he discovered were not biologically his, the organization advocated for mandatory paternity testing of all children at birth in order to prevent paternal discrepancy issues. The grounds on this position is that such a mandatory process would uphold a child's right to have contact with their biological fathers.

While the organization is a children's rights group, one scholar and a few media outlooks view the organization and its president as men's and fathers' rights advocates. Psychologist and academic Erica Burman comments that the group "has appropriated a discourse of children's rights as an anti-feminist strategy" and has adopted the acronym of the Canadian Coalition for the Rights of Children.
