= KPNC =

Country radio station

- Ponca City, Oklahoma; United States
- Frequency: 100.7 MHz
- Branding: "101 Country KPNC"

Programming
- Format: Country

Ownership
- Owner: Team Radio, L.L.C.

Technical information
- Licensing authority: FCC
- Facility ID: 35485
- Class: C3
- ERP: 25,000 watts
- HAAT: 77.0 meters (252.6 ft)
- Transmitter coordinates: 36°46′59.00″N 97°4′15.00″W

Links
- Public license information: Public file; LMS
- Webcast: Listen Live
- Website: KPNC radio

KPNC (100.7 FM) is a radio station broadcasting a Country music format. Licensed to Ponca City, Oklahoma, United States, the station is currently owned by Team Radio, L.L.C.
