= CIOG-FM =

Christian radio station in Charlottetown, Prince Edward Island

Coordinates: 46°17′14″N 63°06′08″W

- Charlottetown, Prince Edward Island; Canada
- Frequency: 91.3 MHz
- Branding: PEI's Inspire FM

Programming
- Format: Christian radio

Ownership
- Owner: International Harvesters for Christ Evangelistic Association
- Sister stations: CJLU-FM Halifax, CITA-FM Greater Moncton

History
- First air date: 2008
- Call sign meaning: Christ Is Our God

Technical information
- ERP: 250 watts
- HAAT: 41 metres (135 ft)
- Repeater: CIOG-FM-1 92.5 Summerside

Links
- Website: inspire.fm

CIOG-FM is a Canadian Christian radio station, broadcasting at 91.3 FM in Charlottetown, Prince Edward Island with a rebroadcaster CIOG-FM-1 at 92.5 FM in Summerside. Since April 2024, the station is known as "PEI's Inspire FM"

Owned by the International Harvesters for Christ Evangelistic Association, the station was licensed in 2008.

On June 16, 2010, CIOG applied to the CRTC to change its frequency for its Summerside transmitter from 91.1 to 92.5 MHz; the frequency change was approved on August 13, 2010.

On October 12, 2011, CIOG applied to the CRTC to increase power from 50 watts to 250 watts on both 91.3 and 92.5; the transmitter site for 91.3 will be relocated under the proposal.

On February 6, 2013, the CRTC approved the application by the station to change the authorized contours of 91.3 by increasing its effective radiated power (ERP) from 50 to 250 watts, and to change the authorized contours of 92.5 by increasing that transmitter's ERP from 50 to 250 watts.

In April of 2024, the station (along with Moncton sister station CITA-FM and Halifax's CJLU-FM) rebranded to "Inspire FM".
