= CBI-FM =

CBC Music station in Nova Scotia, Canada

Coordinates: 46.0944°N 60.1478°W

- Sydney, Nova Scotia; Canada
- Broadcast area: Cape Breton Island
- Frequency: 105.1 MHz

Programming
- Format: Adult contemporary/Public music
- Network: CBC Music

Ownership
- Owner: Canadian Broadcasting Corporation
- Sister stations: CBI

History
- First air date: August 28, 1978
- Former frequencies: 105.9 MHz (1978–1984)
- Call sign meaning: Cape Breton Island

Technical information
- Class: C
- ERP: 61.7 kWs average 100 kWs peak (horizontal polarization only)
- HAAT: 122.5 metres (402 ft)

Links
- Website: CBC Nova Scotia

CBI-FM is a Canadian radio station, which broadcasts the programming of the CBC Music network in Sydney, Nova Scotia. The station airs at 105.1 FM.

== History ==
CBI-FM originally launched on August 28, 1978, at 105.9 FM, until it changed to its current frequency in 1984.
