= WRES-LP =

- Asheville, North Carolina; United States
- Broadcast area: Western North Carolina
- Frequency: 100.7 FM
- Branding: WRES 100.7

Programming
- Format: Urban Variety

Ownership
- Owner: Empowerment Resource Center of Asheville & Buncombe Co. Inc.

History
- First air date: 2004

Technical information
- Licensing authority: FCC
- Facility ID: 135084
- Class: L1
- ERP: 94 watts
- HAAT: 30.7 meters (101 ft)
- Transmitter coordinates: type:city 35°35′48.00″N 82°33′18.00″W

Links
- Public license information: LMS
- Website: www.wresfm.com

WRES-LP (100.7 FM) is a non-commercial low-power FM (LPFM) radio station located in Asheville, North Carolina, that features a mixture of Urban Contemporary, Jazz, Gospel, and news and information targeted to the area's African-American population. The station is licensed by the Federal Communications Commission (FCC) to broadcast with an effective radiated power (ERP) of 0.094 kW.

== History ==
WRES signed on August 26, 2004. The station is owned by the Empowerment Resource Center of Asheville & Buncombe Co. Inc.
