= Colombo Institute of Research & Psychology =

Colombo Institute of Research and Psychology (CIRP)
- Motto: Ad Lucem
- Motto in English: "Towards the light"
- Type: Private
- Established: 2010
- Founders: Dr. Darshan Perera
- Affiliations: Edith Cowan University Australia; Finder's University Australia; Association of Business Executives (ABE) UK; OTHM (UK)
- Dean: Dr. Ranjith Batuwanthudawe
- Students: 600
- Location: Colombo, Sri Lanka
- Campus: Urban
- Website: researchandpsychology.com

Colombo Institute of Research and Psychology (CIRP) is a private institute of higher education in Colombo, Sri Lanka, the commercial capital of the country. CIRP primarily provides higher education and training in psychology and related areas. The main campus is housed in two units known as Sea Side Campus and Land Side Campus facing each other on the Colombo – Galle main road.

Incorporated in June 2010, CIRP was granted registration as an awarding body by Tertiary & Vocational Education Commission of Sri Lanka in December 2010.

== History ==
Colombo Institute of Research & Psychology (CIRP) was established in 2010 with the aim of popularizing and promoting psychology education, psychological research and practice of psychology in the country. It aims to increase capacity building in the field of mental health and establishing psychological services in par with international standards.

CIRP is the only academic institution in Sri Lanka that operates with its own psychotherapy and research divisions providing internships to students in therapy, counseling, research and other related areas of study.

== Facilities ==
- CIRP owns a multi facet psychotherapy center and a counseling laboratory.
- CIRP is the only Sri Lankan institute with a neuropsychology laboratory which is equipped for conducting researches related to neuropsychology.

== Student life ==
- The Student Union of CIRP

The student union of CIRP is a student council which ensures the respective needs of CIRP's student body are heard and represented. The student union takes the responsibility of organizing social & recreational student activities and organizing student career guidance services.

- CIRP Toastmasters Club

The Toastmasters Club of CIRP gives the students an opportunity to improve their speaking and leadership skills.

- D' Psyched

D' Psyched is a student singing group.

== See also ==
- Education in Sri Lanka
- Sri Lankan universities
