= CBAF-FM-5 =

Ici Radio-Canada Première station in Halifax, Nova Scotia

- Halifax, Nova Scotia; Canada
- Broadcast area: Nova Scotia; Port au Port Peninsula; St. John's Metropolitan Area
- Frequency: 92.3 MHz

Programming
- Format: News/Talk
- Network: Ici Radio-Canada Première

Ownership
- Owner: Canadian Broadcasting Corporation

History
- First air date: June 26, 1979 (as a CBAF repeater); 1987 (as a separate station)
- Call sign meaning: Canadian Broadcasting Corporation Atlantic French

Technical information
- Class: C
- ERP: 91,000 watts (horizontal polarization)
- HAAT: 230.5 metres (756 ft)
- Transmitter coordinates: 44°39′2.88″N 63°39′24.84″W

Links
- Website: Ici Radio-Canada Première

CBAF-FM-5 is a French-language public radio station located in Halifax, Nova Scotia. It is part of the Ici Radio-Canada Première Network.

Owned and operated by the Canadian Broadcasting Corporation, it broadcasts at 92.3 MHz with an effective radiated power of 91,000 watts, using horizontal polarization. It is a Class C station using a non-directional antenna. The broadcast tower is located on Washmill Lake Drive in Clayton Park. The studios and offices are located on Chebucto Road in Halifax. The station also serves as the Première outlet for the Island of Newfoundland, by way of two repeaters.

== Programming ==
The station has an ad-free news/talk format and is part of the Ici Radio-Canada Première network, which operates across Canada. Like all Première stations, but unlike most FM stations, it broadcasts in mono.

The station produces a morning drive time show (Le Réveil, Monday to Friday from 6 to 9 a.m.) and a Saturday morning fill-in show (Ça se passe ICI from 11 a.m. to 12 p.m.). An afternoon drive time program, L'heure de pointe Acadie comes from CBAF-FM Moncton, which also airs on CBAF-FM-15 in Charlottetown, Prince Edward Island.

== History ==
The station signed on in 1979 as a rebroadcaster of CBAF 1300 in Moncton. In 1987, it became a separate station, despite retaining a rebroadcaster-like call sign.

CBAF-FM-5 was originally identified as CBAF-19-FM. The call sign change took effect on September 1, 1989. At that time, the old 1300 signal of CBAF was shut down.

== Transmitters ==
Rebroadcasters of CBAF-FM-5
City of licence	Identifier	Frequency	Power	Class	RECNet	CRTC Decision	Notes
Chéticamp	CBAF-FM-13	103.9 FM	82 watts	A	Query		46°34′40.08″N 60°59′0.96″W
Digby	CBAF-FM-7	104.7 FM	980 watts	A	Query		44°40′37.92″N 65°43′59.16″W
Margaree	CBAF-FM-12	92.3 FM	82 watts	A	Query	85-732	46°19′3″N 60°58′5.16″W
Middleton	CBAF-FM-6	107.5 FM	19,000 watts	B	Query		45°4′45.12″N 64°48′51.12″W
Mulgrave	CBAF-FM-11	107.5 FM	93,400 watts	C	Query		45°35′56.04″N 61°24′43.92″W
New Glasgow	CBAF-FM-10	88.7 FM	1,200 watts	A	Query		45°32′2.04″N 62°38′8.88″W
Sydney	CBAF-FM-14	95.9 FM	61,700 watts	C	Query		46°5′44.16″N 60°8′48.12″W
Weymouth	CBAF-FM-8	100.9 FM	500 watts	A	Query	88-205	44°25′40.08″N 66°0′59.04″W
Yarmouth	CBAF-FM-9	107.3 FM	1,180 watts	A	Query		43°55′58.08″N 66°6′6.12″W
Stephenville, Newfoundland and Labrador	CBAF-FM-16	94.3 FM	1,034 watts	B	Query		48°35′22.92″N 58°39′43.92″W
St. John's, Newfoundland and Labrador	CBAF-FM-17	105.9 FM	45,900 watts	C	Query		47°32′3.84″N 52°47′21.12″W
