= CKJM-FM =

Francophone community radio station in Chéticamp, Nova Scotia

Coordinates: 46°36′55″N 61°02′49″W

- Chéticamp, Nova Scotia; Canada
- Frequency: 106.1 MHz
- Branding: 106,1 CKJM

Programming
- Language: French
- Format: Community radio

Ownership
- Owner: La Cooperative Radio-Chéticamp

History
- Founded: 1991
- First air date: 1995

Technical information
- Class: A
- ERP: 3 kW
- HAAT: −30 metres (−98 ft)

Links
- Website: ckjmfm.ca (French) ckjmfm.ca/en (English)

CKJM-FM is a radio station, broadcasting from Chéticamp, Nova Scotia, Canada on 106.1 FM. Owned by La Cooperative Radio-Chéticamp, the station has broadcast as a full-time French-language community radio service since 1995.

== History ==
CKJM's history stems back to 1991, when the station was on the air intermittently on a special events license issued by the CRTC and Industry Canada, which allowed it to be on the air for only up to 28 days per event. The station broadcast from 1991 to 1994 for these events, as approved by the CRTC:

- L'Escaouette se diffuse, August 1 to 4, 1991
- Courons la mi-Carême, March 16 to 29, 1992
- L'Escaouette en Fête, 1992
- Fêtons la mi-Carême March 14 to 21, 1993
- Célébrons le centenaire de notre église and Le festival de l'Escaouette, 1993
- Laissons rentrer les mi-carêmes, 1994
- L'Escaouette en Fête, 1994

On February 17, 2014, the CRTC approved Radio Chéticamp's application to operate a repeater in Sydney, broadcasting at 97.5 MHz with an average effective radiated power of 830 watts (non-directional antenna with an effective height of antenna above average terrain of 6.5 metres; 21 ft).

The station is a member of the Alliance des radios communautaires du Canada.
