= KLVF =

- Las Vegas, New Mexico; United States
- Frequency: 100.7 MHz
- Branding: The Best Music

Programming
- Format: Adult contemporary
- Affiliations: AP Radio

Ownership
- Owner: Baca Broadcasting, LLC

History
- First air date: June 19, 1973 (as KFUN-FM)
- Former call signs: KFUN-FM (1973–1980)

Technical information
- Licensing authority: FCC
- Facility ID: 34441
- Class: C3
- ERP: 10,000 watts
- HAAT: −23 meters (−75 ft)
- Transmitter coordinates: 35°35′48″N 105°12′21″W

Links
- Public license information: Public file; LMS

KLVF (100.7 FM, "The Best Music") is a radio station broadcasting an adult contemporary music format. Licensed to Las Vegas, New Mexico, United States, the station is currently owned by Baca Broadcasting, LLC and features programming from AP Radio.

== History ==
The station was assigned the call sign KFUN-FM on May 30, 1980. On September 22, 1980, it changed its call sign to the current KLVF.

On October 18, 2002, then-owner KFUN-KLVF Inc. assigned the station's license, along with that of KFUN, to Meadows Media, LLC. Meadows Media assigned the license to the current owner, Baca Broadcasting, on September 23, 2008, at a purchase price of $600,000.
