= CKCC-FM =

Radio station in Campbell River, British Columbia

- Campbell River, British Columbia; Canada
- Broadcast area: Northern Vancouver Island
- Frequency: 100.7 MHz
- Branding: The Raven 100.7

Programming
- Format: Country

Ownership
- Owner: Aupe Cultural Enhancement Society

History
- First air date: 2019

Technical information
- Class: C1
- ERP: 3.742 kilowatts
- HAAT: 277 metres (909 ft)

CKCC-FM is a Canadian radio station, broadcasting at 100.7 FM in Campbell River, British Columbia. Licensed as a Type B community radio station, it broadcasts a country music format branded as The Raven 100.7.

Owned and operated by the Aupe Cultural Enhancement Society, the station broadcasts primarily in English but with some programming in Ayajuthem for the local Homalco First Nation.

The station was licensed by the CRTC in 2016, and officially launched in November 2019 after a few weeks of testing.
