= CJCA =

Radio station in Edmonton, Canada

- Edmonton, Alberta; Canada
- Broadcast area: Edmonton Metropolitan Region
- Frequency: 930 kHz
- Branding: AM930 The Light

Programming
- Format: Religious

Ownership
- Owner: Touch Canada Broadcasting
- Sister stations: CJLI

History
- First air date: May 1, 1922

Technical information
- Class: B
- Power: 50,000 watts
- Transmitter coordinates: 53°29′26″N 113°29′46″W

Links
- Webcast: Listen Live
- Website: cjca.ca

CJCA is a Canadian radio station. It operates at 930 AM branded as AM930 The Light in Edmonton, Alberta. It is Alberta’s first radio station, established by the Edmonton Journal in May 1922.

== History ==
It was first licensed to the Edmonton Journal newspaper in 1922, and it first broadcast – from a corner of the Edmonton Journal newsroom – on May 1, 1922, becoming Alberta's first radio station. The Edmonton Journal sold the radio station in 1934. It was an affiliate of the Canadian Radio Broadcasting Commission from 1933 to 1936, when it affiliated with the newly formed Canadian Broadcasting Corporation. It was affiliated to CBC Radio's main Trans-Canada Network until 1962. CJCA was later purchased by Selkirk Communications. As of 1994, it broadcasts entirely Christian programming.

One of the "Radio 93"'s mid-1960s logos

During the 1960s CJCA was one of two major pop and rock stations in Edmonton (the other being CHED). For many years the CJCA broadcast studios were located on the 4th floor of the Birks building in downtown Edmonton. On top of the Birks building was a huge billboard of a tiger wearing sunglasses — CJCA was also known as Tiger Radio. It used "Tiger Radio", "Radio 93", and "CJCA Radio 93" in on-air announcements and jingles.

Walt Rutherford, Phil Floyd, John McKittrick, Murray Blakely, Terry Spense and Earl McKittrick were in the newsroom. Gord Skuttle was the chief engineer (assisted by Andre Picard). Harry Boon was the music director with Dalt Elton as Program Director. The Top 40 was played twice in a row on Saturdays. Dixieland Jazz was played live from a club for an hour on Thursday nights. Each high school had its own "fight" song for dedications. The DJs were household names, and their pictures were passed out as folding cards. The Top 40 sheet was distributed weekly, and once a month a listener would win the Top 40 records for that week.

An FM station was started from the back production studio. The FM simulcast the AM except for 6:00 p.m. to midnight when CJCA-FM played more traditional adult pop music which was handled by an operator who played the records along with the pre-taped announcer.

Many "Radio 93" on-air personalities who went on to bigger markets include singer–songwriter Barry Boyd, who had a Canadian hit record, "Wishin'". In the mid-1960s Barry moved to KFXM Radio in San Bernardino, California, which also called itself Tiger Radio. Before returning to Edmonton, Barry was a jock on KCBQ in San Diego. Barry died in Edmonton in 2001. Other famous CJCA DJs included Mike Marshall, who later crossed the street to CHED and then became Frank Brodie at the legendary CKLW in Windsor, Ontario. Jim Hault was a longtime CJCA morning man. Hault later became an on-air institution in Vancouver.

On weekdays, George Payne did afternoons; Barry Boyd 4:00–8:00; Lorne Thompson (who was later an instructor and department head at NAIT) 8:00 to midnight; and Tom Fulton (who came from the Quesnel/Williams Lake station) the A&W all night show. Fulton came to Toronto's CKFH, then spent his final years at CJRT and AM740. Jim Hand was an extremely popular morning man (prior to Jim Hault) and a real character. The city was shocked when he died at such a young age, from a brain tumor. A couple of other DJ characters of this era were Frantic Frank Todd (weekends), Don Lamb (weekends and promotions director), and Bernie Bisiup (the all-night show — prior to Tom). Because of the station's popularity the DJs spent a lot of time doing remote broadcasts at car dealerships and stores. Ratings-wise, CJCA led the way for a number of years. Lorne Thompson helped a number of young guys get started in radio, including Terry David Mulligan who was then an RCMP officer patrolling the Edmonton–Calgary highway. Doug Thompson, an army brat and still at Queen Elizabeth high school, started as an operator and later went on to a long career behind the scenes at CHUM in Toronto. Hal Weaver was a very popular CJCA DJ in the mid-1960s. A few years later, he would also bring that popularity to CHUM. Bryan Fustukian, broadcasting as Vik Armen, was also associated with CJCA during this period.

In the 1970s, a new roster of personalities came to the airwaves, among them Bryan Hall, Bob Arnold, Gord Edlund, Jim Elliot, Dan Jarvis, Mike LeBlanc, Gord Whitehead, and Ryan Grigor.

CJCA was also home for the Edmonton Eskimos and Edmonton Trappers. Their games were broadcast live on CJCA for many years.

In the mid to late 1980s CJCA changed to an "all talk" format and while it was successful for a short while the station eventually failed and went off the air on December 1, 1993. Shortly thereafter, the rights to the station were purchased by Touch Canada Broadcasting, and on April 3, 1994, it returned to the air as a Christian station.

Today, AM 930 The Light plays spoken word programming talking about what matters as Edmonton's Positive Talk station. The Light also plays plenty of Christian worship music. AM 930 has four brother stations: Shine FM Calgary CJSI-FM, Shine FM Edmonton CJRY-FM, 90.5 Shine FM Red Deer CKRD-FM and AM 700 The Light in Calgary CJLI-AM.

== See also ==
- CJRY-FM
- Christian radio
