= CBI (AM) =

CBC Radio One station in Nova Scotia, Canada

- Sydney, Nova Scotia; Canada
- Broadcast area: Cape Breton Island
- Frequency: 1140 kHz

Programming
- Format: News–talk
- Network: CBC Radio One

Ownership
- Owner: Canadian Broadcasting Corporation
- Sister stations: CBI-FM

History
- First air date: November 1, 1948
- Former frequencies: 1570 kHz (1948–1955)
- Call sign meaning: "Cape Breton Island"

Technical information
- Licensing authority: CRTC
- Class: B
- Power: 10,000 watts
- Transmitter coordinates: 46°5′39.9″N 60°8′51.9″W

Links
- Website: cbc.ca/ns

CBI (1140 AM) is a radio station licensed to Sydney, Nova Scotia, Canada, serving Cape Breton Island as an owned-and-operated station of CBC Radio One. The station's reach is extended by a network of FM rebroadcasters, including CBIS-FM (92.1 FM) in Sydney.

== History ==
CBI was launched on November 1, 1948, at AM 1570, with a power of 1,000 watts. Prior to its launch, CBC Radio programming was aired by private affiliate CJCB 1270 and its shortwave relay CJCX 6.01 MHz (in the 49 m band). In 1955, CBI increased power from 1,000 to 5,000 watts and changed frequency from 1570 to 1140 kHz.

By 1964, CBI was operating with a full-time power of 10,000 watts, though using a directional antenna at night to protect clear-channel Class A stations WRVA in Richmond, Virginia; and XEMR-AM in Apodaca, Nuevo León, Mexico.

On July 9, 2007, CBI was given approval by the CRTC to convert the station to the FM band at 97.1 MHz under the call sign CBIT-FM and to shut down the AM transmitter. In a license renewal submission to the CRTC in June 2011, CBC stated that it did not have the resources to implement the plan before the authorization lapsed.

On October 6, 2015, the CRTC approved the CBC's application for a nested FM transmitter in Sydney at 92.1 MHz with an average effective radiated power (ERP) of 6,540 watts (maximum ERP of 10,650 watts) and an effective height above average terrain of 122.8 metres. In its application the CBC stated that the FM transmitter would address increasingly evident reception issues with the 1140 signal in downtown Sydney, as well as other areas where the 1140 signal is not sufficient, especially in fringe areas. The CBC provided a map showing that CBI's nighttime pattern differs from its daytime pattern in that the night pattern directs the AM signal towards the northeast to protect other radio stations, resulting in a loss of reception in the area southwest of Sydney. The CBC argued that this problem is so severe that CBI's Radio One morning programming is also simulcast on its CBC Music transmitter in Sydney (CBI-FM 105.1) from 6 a.m. to 9 a.m. on weekdays to properly serve the population of Sydney while the nighttime pattern is still in effect. The CBC further stated that it had no plans to shut down its existing AM service because replicating it would require the addition of two rebroadcasting sites, one in the South Haven area and one in Ingonish (northwest of Sydney).

The new call sign for 92.1 is CBIS-FM, while the call sign CBI-FM are currently used for CBC Music service. After a period of testing, the new FM transmitter officially went on the air at 8:00 am AST on February 25, 2016.

== Local programming ==
The station's local programs are Information Morning, hosted since 2007 by Steve Sutherland, broadcast weekdays from 6:00 a.m. to 8:37 a.m. and Main Street, from 4:00 p.m. to 6:00 p.m., hosted since 1996 by Wendy Bergfeldt. Although both programs have the same name as mainland counterpart CBHA-FM in Halifax, they are distinct programs produced in Sydney. A third long running local program is Island Echoes, a weekly program specializing in Cape Breton Island culture, on air since May 1971. Hosted by Wendy Bergfeldt since 1993, Island Echoes is broadcast on Saturdays from 8:00 p.m. - 9:00 p.m.

== Rebroadcasters ==
CBI has the following rebroadcasters:

Rebroadcasters of CBI
City of licence	Identifier	Frequency	RECNet	CRTC Decision
Bay St. Lawrence	CBIB-FM	90.1 FM	Query	
Chéticamp	CBIC-FM	107.1 FM	Query	
Sydney	CBIS-FM	92.1 FM	Query	Decision CRTC 2015-455
Northeast Margaree	CBHF-FM	93.9 FM	Query	Decision CRTC 85-1276
Inverness	CBHI-FM	94.3 FM	Query	Decision CRTC 85-994

=== Station coordinates ===
- CBIB-FM - Bay St. Lawrence - 90.1 at 46°58′34.9″N 60°27′27.6″W
- CBIC-FM - Chéticamp - 107.1 at 46°34′40.9″N 60°59′0.9″W
- CBIS-FM - Sydney - 92.1 at 46°05′39.84″N 60°8′52.08″W
- CBHF-FM - Northeast Margaree - 93.9 at 46°19′4.9″N 60°57′56.9″W
- CBHI-FM - Inverness - 94.3 at 46°6′7.9″N 61°17′20.9″W
