= CJOA-FM =

Radio station in Thunder Bay, Ontario

Coordinates: 48°26′32″N 89°14′26″W

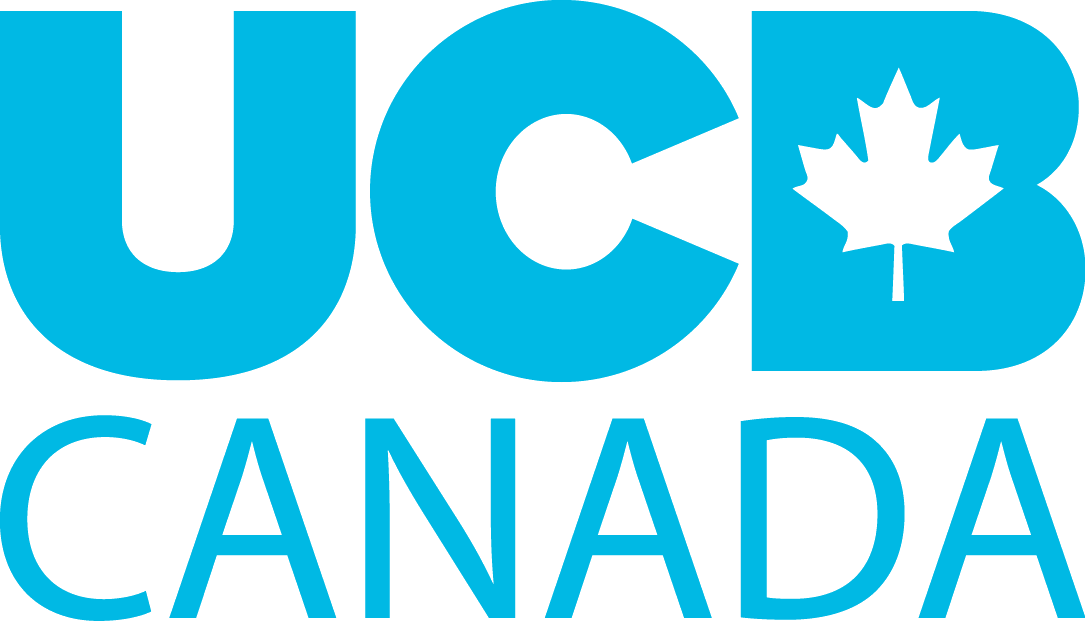
- Thunder Bay, Ontario; Canada
- Frequency: 95.1 MHz
- Branding: UCB Canada

Programming
- Format: Contemporary Christian music

Ownership
- Owner: United Christian Broadcasters Canada

History
- First air date: December 28, 1998

Links
- Website: ucbcanada.com

CJOA-FM is a Canadian radio station, broadcasting at 95.1 FM in Thunder Bay, Ontario. The station broadcasts a contemporary Christian music format.

== History ==
The station, owned by a local non-profit Christian group, received CRTC approval on September 28, 1998 and launched on December 28, 1998.

In addition to its main transmitter at Thunder Bay, the station also had a low-power rebroadcast transmitter operating on 93.1 FM at the nearby Candy Mountain, Ontario ski resort, that was closed in 2005.

On October 9, 2018, the CRTC approved United Christian Broadcasters Media Canada's application to operate a new FM transmitter at Nipigon on the frequency of 92.5 MHz (channel 223LP) with an effective radiated power of 50 watts (non-directional antenna with an effective height of antenna above average terrain of -4.5 metres).

The call sign may stand for "Celebrating Jesus on Air," or "Christ Jesus on Air".

== See also ==
- Christian radio
