= KTHU =

Coordinates: 39.888°N 122.628°W

- Corning, California; United States
- Broadcast area: Chico / Oroville / Corning
- Frequency: 100.7 MHz
- Branding: Thunder 100.7

Programming
- Format: Classic rock

Ownership
- Owner: Results Radio of Chico Licensee, LLC

History
- First air date: 1988 (as KCEZ)
- Former call signs: KVCC (1985–1987); KEZD (10/1987-11/1987); KCEZ (1987–1999)
- Call sign meaning: K THUnder

Technical information
- Licensing authority: FCC
- Facility ID: 52509
- Class: B
- ERP: 50,000 watts
- HAAT: 83 meters

Links
- Public license information: Public file; LMS
- Webcast: Listen live
- Website: thunder1007.com

KTHU is a commercial radio station located in Corning, California, broadcasting to the Northern California and area on 100.7 FM. KTHU airs a classic rock music format branded as "Thunder 100.7".
