= CJFH-FM =

Christian radio station in Woodstock, Ontario

Coordinates: 43°06′11″N 80°46′16″W

- Woodstock, Ontario; Canada
- Frequency: 94.3 MHz
- Branding: Hope FM

Programming
- Format: Christian music

Ownership
- Owner: Sound of Faith Broadcasting

History
- Call sign meaning: Christ Jesus Faith Hope

Technical information
- Licensing authority: CRTC
- Class: LP
- ERP: 37 watts (vert.)
- HAAT: 71.5 metres (235 ft)

Links
- Webcast: Listen live
- Website: hopefm.ca

CJFH-FM is a Canadian radio station, broadcasting at 94.3 FM in Woodstock, Ontario. The station airs a Christian music format branded "Hope FM".

The station is owned by Sound of Faith Broadcasting Inc. which was approved by the Canadian Radio-television and Telecommunications Commission to operate a new low-power Christian music FM radio station on May 7, 2003 and officially launched on December 17, 2003 as Faith FM which later changed to Hope FM in 2005.

In 2005, CJFH-FM applied to change frequency to 104.7 MHz and increase power to 3,100 watts average ERP (5,350 watts maximum ERP), and to increase antenna height to 104 meters. The application was denied August 25. The frequency went to another applicant.

On April 10, 2006, Sound of Faith was denied to increase CJFH-FM's power from 50 watts to 250 watts and increase in antenna height.

On March 13, 2007, the CRTC approved Sound of Faith's application to amend the broadcasting licence by changing the authorized contours, decreasing the effective radiated power from 50 to 37 watts, increasing the antenna height and relocating the transmitter.

Hope FM 94.3 logo
