= CKWM-FM =

Radio station in Kentville, Nova Scotia

Coordinates: 45°09′46″N 64°33′24″W

- Kentville, Nova Scotia; Canada
- Frequency: 94.9 MHz
- Branding: Magic 94.9

Programming
- Format: Adult contemporary

Ownership
- Owner: Maritime Broadcasting System
- Sister stations: CKEN-FM

History
- First air date: March 14, 1965
- Former call signs: CKEN-FM (1956–2003)
- Call sign meaning: Kentville-Wolfville Municipality (broadcast area)

Technical information
- Class: C
- ERP: 100 kW (horizontal only)
- HAAT: 237.4 metres (779 ft)

Links
- Webcast: Listen Live
- Website: magic949.ca

CKWM-FM is a Canadian radio station broadcasting from Kentville, Nova Scotia at 94.9 FM owned by the Maritime Broadcasting System. The station currently plays an adult contemporary format branded on-air as "Magic 94.9".

The station began broadcasting on March 14, 1965 as CKEN-FM. From 1981 to 1988, it was a station affiliate of CBC Stereo.

On January 10, 2003, CKEN moved to sister station CKWM-FM’s 97.7 MHz frequency from 1490 AM. CKWM-FM Magic 97 took the 94.9 frequency that CKEN had applied for, becoming Magic 94.9, while CKEN became AVR (Annapolis Valley Radio) at 97.7 FM.
