= New Tusket =

Community in Nova Scotia, Canada

Coordinates: 44°17′3.45″N 65°54′22.05″W

New Tusket in Nova Scotia

New Tusket is a community in the Canadian province of Nova Scotia, located in Digby County. The name "Tusket" is derived from the Mi'kmaq word Neketaouksit, meaning great forked tidal river.

== See also ==
- Tusket
