= CITA-FM =

Christian radio station in New Brunswick, Canada

Coordinates: 46°08′10″N 64°54′06″W

- Moncton, New Brunswick; Canada
- Broadcast area: Greater Moncton
- Frequency: 105.1 MHz
- Branding: Inspire 105.1

Programming
- Format: Christian

Ownership
- Owner: International Harvesters for Christ Evangelistic Association Inc.
- Sister stations: CJLU-FM, CIOG-FM

History
- First air date: 2000
- Call sign meaning: "Christ is the Answer"

Technical information
- Class: A
- ERP: 880 watts
- HAAT: 84 metres (276 ft)
- Repeaters: CITA-FM-1 107.3 FM - Sussex, New Brunswick; CITA-FM-2 99.1 FM - Amherst, Nova Scotia; CITA-FM-4 107.7 FM - Bouctouche, New Brunswick

Links
- Website: inspire.fm

CITA-FM is a Canadian radio station, broadcasting a Christian programming format at 105.1 FM in Moncton, New Brunswick. Previously known as "CITA" and then "Harvesters FM", the station has been known as Greater Moncton's Inspire 105.1 since April 2024.

The station is co-owned with CJLU-FM in Dartmouth, Nova Scotia and CIOG-FM in Charlottetown, Prince Edward Island.

On August 24, 2000, the International Harvesters for Christ Evangelistic Association Inc. received approval from the CRTC to operate on the frequency 105.9 MHz.

On August 22, 2007, the CRTC approved an application for CITA to move from 105.9 FM to 105.1 FM, and to increase its signal strength to 880 watts. This change was prompted by the Canadian Broadcasting Corporation's decision to move CBA from the AM band to 106.1 on the FM band, now known as CBAM-FM.

On June 30, 2017, the CRTC denied an application by International Harvesters for Christ Evangelistic Association Inc. to operate an English-language commercial FM specialty (Christian music) radio station at 104.9 MHz in Saint John, New Brunswick.

Previous logo (2001-2023)

== Rebroadcasters ==
CITA has a number of rebroadcasters that serve communities in New Brunswick and Nova Scotia.

- CITA-FM-1 107.3 FM - Sussex, New Brunswick
- CITA-FM-2 99.1 FM - Amherst, Nova Scotia
- CITA-FM-4 107.7 FM - Bouctouche, New Brunswick
