= CIAJ-FM =

Christian radio station in Prince Rupert, British Columbia

Coordinates: 54°18′36″N 130°19′24″W

- Prince Rupert, British Columbia; Canada
- Frequency: 100.7 MHz
- Branding: New Life FM

Programming
- Format: Christian

Ownership
- Owner: Aboriginal Christian Voice Network

History
- First air date: 2000
- Call sign meaning: Christ Is the Almighty Jesus

Technical information
- Licensing authority: CRTC
- Class: LP
- ERP: 26 watts

CIAJ-FM was a Christian radio station that broadcast at 100.7 FM in Prince Rupert, British Columbia.

Owned by the Aboriginal Christian Voice Network, the station was given approval by the CRTC on October 18, 1999. It continues broadcasting today (October 2024) perhaps without a license or on low power.
