= CJRY-FM =

Christian radio station in Edmonton, Alberta

- Edmonton, Alberta; Canada
- Broadcast area: Edmonton Metropolitan Region
- Frequency: 105.9 MHz
- Branding: Shine 105.9 FM

Programming
- Format: Contemporary Christian music

Ownership
- Owner: Touch Canada Broadcasting

History
- First air date: September 2004
- Call sign meaning: Christ Jesus Redeems You

Technical information
- Class: C1
- ERP: 100 kW
- HAAT: 193 metres (633 ft)
- Transmitter coordinates: 53°30′48″N 113°17′5″W

CJRY-FM is an FM Christian radio station that broadcasts on 105.9 FM from Edmonton, Alberta. The station uses the on-air brand Shine FM often with the tag-line "Safe and Fun for the Whole Family!", referencing the core goal of the station, and mainly plays contemporary Christian music.

CJRY received approval by the CRTC in 2003 and first aired in September 2004. Owned by Touch Canada Broadcasting (2006) Inc., CJRY currently has four sister stations: AM 930 CJCA in Edmonton, CJSI-FM and AM 700 CJLI in Calgary, and CKRD-FM in Red Deer.
