= CJFY-FM =

Christian radio station in Miramichi, New Brunswick

Coordinates: 47°00′43″N 65°35′15″W

- Miramichi, New Brunswick; Canada
- Broadcast area: Miramichi Valley
- Frequency: 96.5 MHz
- Branding: Life Radio

Programming
- Format: Contemporary Christian music

Ownership
- Owner: Miramichi Fellowship Center, Inc.

History
- First air date: 2004
- Call sign meaning: Christ Jesus Follows You

Links
- Website: liferadio.ca

CJFY-FM is a Canadian radio station in Miramichi, New Brunswick broadcasting at 96.5 MHz in Miramichi, and at 107.7 MHz in Miramichi River Valley. The station broadcasts a Contemporary Christian music format and is owned by Miramichi Fellowship Center, Inc.

== History ==
CJFY has been on the air since 2004, originally at 107.5 FM.

In 2007, CJFY Blackville was authorized to move from 107.5 to 107.7 FM.

On October 28, 2011, Miramichi Fellowship Center, Inc. applied to add a new FM transmitter in Miramichi River Valley. If approved, the new transmitter will operate at 96.5 MHz in Miramichi and 107.7 MHz in Miramichi River Valley. On May 18, 2012, Miramichi Fellowship Center, Inc. received approval from the Canadian Radio-television and Telecommunications Commission (CRTC) to operate a new english-language FM radio station at Miramichi.

== See also ==
- CT-20
- Christian radio
