= CKEN-FM =

Radio station in Kentville, Nova Scotia

Coordinates: 45°09′46″N 64°33′24″W

- Kentville, Nova Scotia; Canada
- Broadcast area: Kentville; Middleton; Digby; Weymouth
- Frequency: 97.7 MHz
- Branding: AVR

Programming
- Format: Country

Ownership
- Owner: Maritime Broadcasting System
- Sister stations: CFAB, CKWM-FM

History
- First air date: 1947
- Former frequencies: 1490 kHz (AM) (1947–1953); 1350 kHz (1953–1979); 1490 kHz (1979–2003)
- Call sign meaning: Kentville (broadcast area)

Technical information
- Class: B
- ERP: 18 kW horizontal polarization only
- HAAT: 201 metres (659 ft)

Links
- Website: avrnetwork.com

CKEN-FM is a Canadian radio station, broadcasting from Kentville, Nova Scotia at 97.7 FM. The station currently plays a country format and is branded on-air as AVR (which is short for Annapolis Valley Radio). The station has been on the air since 1947.

The station originally broadcast at 1490 AM, then moved to 1350 AM in 1953, then back to 1490 AM in 1979. In July 2002, the station received CRTC approval to move to 94.9 FM; instead, it moved to 97.7 FM in 2003. CKWM-FM moved to 94.9 and became Magic 94.9. Both stations are owned by the Maritime Broadcasting System.

== Rebroadcasters ==
| City of licence | Identifier | Frequency | RECNet |
|---|---|---|---|
| Middleton | CKAD | 1350 AM | Query |
| Digby | CKDY | 99.7 FM | Query |
| Weymouth | CKDY-1-FM | 103.3 FM | Query |

On November 15, 2011, MBS received CRTC approval to operate CKDY as a separate, locally originated station, with CKDY-1-FM continuing to repeat CKDY.

CKEN-FM's programming previously simulcasted on CFAB AM in Windsor; that station broke off from the AVR network in 2008, to broadcast as an independently operated station.

On February 26, 2020, the station's copper wiring and computer system was stolen by an unknown person. This resulted in the AM signal being off-air, leaving listeners to rely on the FM signal in Weymouth. On February 28, 2020, an arrest was made involving a 40-year old unnamed woman, who subsequently faced charges in connection with theft and vandalization. She was due in the Digby provincial court in April.

In March 2020, the CRTC approved Maritime Broadcasting System's application to temporarily operate CKDY on FM at 99.7 MHz until the AM signal at 1420 kHz returns to the air. There was a potential that CKDY would remain on 99.7 FM if the radio station decided to permanently shutdown the AM signal.

On September 30, 2020, Maritime Broadcasting System Limited submitted an application for a broadcasting licence to operate an english-language commercial FM radio station in Digby, NS to replace its AM radio station CKDY Digby. The new station would operate at 99.7 MHz (channel 259B1) with an average effective radiated power (ERP) of 2.39 kW (directional antenna with a maximum ERP of 6.53 KW with an effective height of antenna above average terrain of 165.7 metres).

On May 3, 2021, the CRTC approved Maritime Broadcasting System's application to move CKDY to 99.7 MHz.

On July 28, 2023, the CRTC approved MBS's application to operate a new temporary low-power transmitter at 99.7 MHz (channel 259LP) in Digby with an average effective radiated power (ERP) of 33.5 watts (directional antenna with a maximum ERP of 50 watts and an effective height of the antenna above average terrain [EHAAT] of 33.3 metres). On September 26, 2024, Maritime Broadcasting System Limited received CRTC approval to decrease the maximum effective radiated power (ERP) from 6,530 to 5,570 watts, increase the average ERP from 2,390 to 2,690 watts, decrease the effective antenna height above average terrain (EHAAT) from 165.7 to 24.5 meters, and amend the existing coordinates of the transmitter site.
