= KCLA-LP =

San Pedro, California; United States
- Frequency: 100.7 MHz

Programming
- Format: Adult album alternative

Ownership
- Owner: Art In Motion, Inc.

History
- First air date: March 13, 2015; 10 years ago

Technical information
- Licensing authority: FCC
- Facility ID: 197367
- Class: L1
- ERP: 50 watts
- HAAT: 22.6 meters (74 ft)
- Transmitter coordinates: 33°44′18.3″N 118°17′13.3″W

Links
- Public license information: LMS

KCLA-LP is a low power adult album alternative radio station broadcasting out of San Pedro, California.

== History ==
KCLA-LP began broadcasting on March 3, 2013.

In April 2017, the station went silent until June 30, 2021.
