= CFAB (AM) =

Radio station in Windsor, Nova Scotia

Coordinates: 44°59′43″N 64°06′49″W

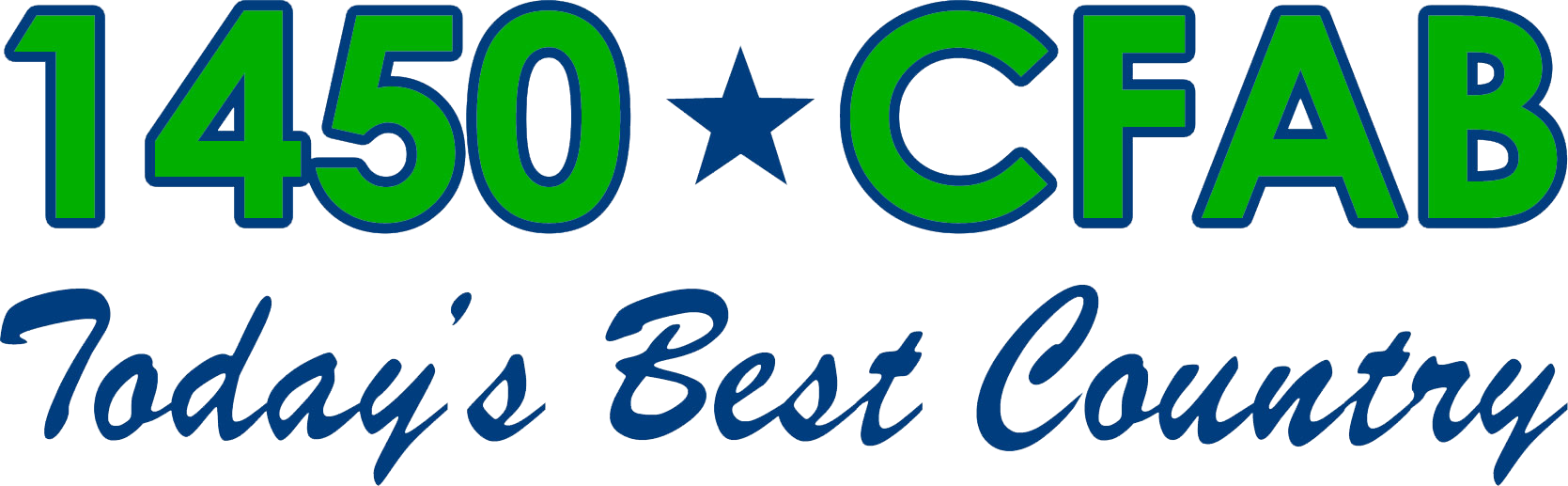
- Windsor, Nova Scotia; Canada
- Broadcast area: West Hants Regional Municipality
- Frequency: 1450 kHz
- Branding: AVR

Programming
- Format: Country

Ownership
- Owner: Maritime Broadcasting System

History
- First air date: November 13, 1945
- Call sign meaning: Canada Founder Avard Bishop

Technical information
- Class: C
- Power: 1,000 watts

Links
- Website: avrnetwork.com/on-air/cfab-on-air-in-windsor

CFAB is a Canadian radio station broadcasting at 1450 AM in Windsor, Nova Scotia. The station currently airs a country format branded as AVR, and is owned & operated by the Maritime Broadcasting System. The station also airs a mix of locally produced programming and simulcasting of its sister station CKEN-FM from Kentville.

== History ==
The station was launched on November 13, 1945 by Evangeline Broadcasting, and was acquired by Annapolis Valley Radio, which would eventually become the Maritime Broadcasting System, in 1979.

The station was given partial authorization by the Canadian Radio-Television and Telecommunications Commission to convert to the FM band in 2006, contingent on choosing a different frequency than its original application. Due to delays in locating a suitable frequency, this FM conversion has not yet taken place as of 2022. On November 20, 2008, the Commission approves an application by Maritime Broadcasting System Limited (Maritime) for an extension, until November 27, 2009.

However, on March 20, 2012, the Canadian Radio-Television and Telecommunications Commission administratively renewed the licence for CFAB to August 31, 2012. On August 28, the licence was administratively renewed to December 31, 2012. On December 19, the licence was renewed to August 31, 2019.
