= CIAY-FM =

Christian radio station in Whitehorse, Yukon

Coordinates: 60°44′11″N 135°05′59″W

- Whitehorse, Yukon; Canada
- Frequency: 100.7 MHz
- Branding: Life 100.7

Programming
- Format: Christian radio

Ownership
- Owner: Bethany Pentecostal Tabernacle

Technical information
- Class: LP
- ERP: 50 watts
- HAAT: 20 metres (66 ft)

Links
- Website: lifewhitehorse.com

CIAY-FM, branded as Life 100.7, is a Christian radio station in Whitehorse, Yukon, Canada. CIAY-FM broadcasts at 100.7 FM airing a combination of religious programming and Contemporary Christian music.

The station is licensed to the Bethany Pentecostal Tabernacle church and is operated by New Life FM, a nonprofit organization involving several other Christian groups. CIAY-FM went on the air in 2004, and relies mostly on volunteer labour.

== Rebroadcasters ==
In addition to its transmitter in Whitehorse, CIAY-FM operates rebroadcasters in:

- Watson Lake, Yukon
- Teslin, Yukon
- Atlin, British Columbia
- Tuktoyuktuk, NWT
- Inuvik, NWT
