= CJLU-FM =

Christian radio station in Dartmouth, Nova Scotia

Coordinates: 44°41′11″N 63°30′39″W

- Dartmouth, Nova Scotia; Canada
- Broadcast area: Halifax Regional Municipality
- Frequency: 93.9 MHz
- Branding: Nova Scotia's Inspire FM

Programming
- Format: Contemporary Christian music and Christian talk and teaching

Ownership
- Owner: International Harvesters for Christ Evangelistic Association Inc.
- Sister stations: CITA-FM, CIOG-FM

History
- First air date: 2005
- Call sign meaning: "Christ Jesus Loves You"

Technical information
- Class: A
- ERP: 3,100 watts
- HAAT: 80 metres (260 ft)
- Repeaters: CJLU-FM-1 (88.3 FM) Wolfville: 175 watts average ERP, HAAT 187 metres

Links
- Website: www.inspire.fm

CJLU-FM (93.9 MHz) is a Canadian radio station, licensed to Dartmouth, Nova Scotia, and serving the Halifax Regional Municipality. The station was previously known as "CJLU" and then "Harvesters FM", but in April 2024, the station rebranded as "Nova Scotia's Inspire FM". CJLU has a repeater station in Wolfville at 88.3 FM with the call sign CJLU-FM-1.

The stations are owned by the International Harvesters for Christ Evangelistic Association Inc. They broadcast Contemporary Christian music part of the day with Christian talk and teaching programs heard at other times. Some religious leaders heard on Inspire FM include David Jeremiah, Charles Stanley, John MacArthur and Jim Daly.

The station received CRTC approval in 2004 and launched in 2005. CJLU also has sister stations in Moncton, New Brunswick (Greater Moncton's Inspire 105.1), and in Charlottetown Prince Edward Island at 91.3 FM PEI's Inspire FM.

On May 21, 2008, CJLU received approval to add a transmitter at Wolfville, Nova Scotia, to simulcast programming on CJLU-FM.

Previous Logo (until 2024)
