= CION-FM =

Radio station in Quebec City, Quebec

Coordinates: 46°49′17″N 71°29′46″W

- Quebec City, Quebec; Canada
- Frequency: 90.9 MHz
- Branding: Radio-Galilée

Programming
- Format: Christian

Ownership
- Owner: Fondation Radio-Galilée

History
- First air date: September 19, 1995

Technical information
- Class: B
- ERP: 5.685 kWs
- HAAT: 418 meters (1,371 ft)

Links
- Website: CION-FM Website

CION-FM, known as Radio-Galilée, is a Christian radio station in Quebec City, Quebec, Canada. Owned and operated by the Fondation Radio-Galilée, it broadcasts on 90.9 MHz with an effective radiated power of 5,865 watts (class B) using an omnidirectional antenna. The station's transmitter is located at Mount Bélair. The station has had a Christian format since it went on the air on September 19, 1995.

== Transmitters ==
Rebroadcasters of CION-FM
City of licence	Identifier	Frequency	Power	Class	RECNet	CRTC Decision
Beauceville	CION-FM-1	102.5 FM	400 watts	A	Query	
Saguenay	CION-FM-2	106.7 FM	46,240 watts	C	Query	2002-412
