= CIRP-FM =

Radio station in Spryfield, Nova Scotia

Coordinates: 44°37′03″N 63°36′50″W

- Spryfield, Nova Scotia; Canada
- Broadcast area: Halifax Regional Municipality
- Frequency: 94.7 MHz
- Branding: Life 94.7 FM

Programming
- Format: Christian music variety

Ownership
- Owner: City Church of Halifax

History
- First air date: 2011
- Call sign meaning: "Christ-Inspired People" or "Christian Inspirational Radio Programming"

Technical information
- Licensing authority: CRTC
- Class: LP
- ERP: 50 watts (vertical)
- HAAT: 25.5 metres (84 ft)

Links
- Website: life947fm.com

CIRP-FM (94.7 FM) is a non-profit radio station which broadcasts a Christian radio format from Spryfield, Nova Scotia, Canada, and serving the Halifax, Nova Scotia market. The station is owned by City Church of Halifax on Herring Cove Road. CIRP-FM plays Light Christian Contemporary music in the morning and Southern Gospel music later in the day.

== History ==
On March 16, 2011, City Church Halifax applied for a new English-language Christian FM radio station at Spryfield. The new station would broadcast on the frequency 94.7 MHz (channel 234LP) with an effective radiated power of 50 watts, using a non-directional antenna with a height above average terrain of 8.3 metres. On September 16, 2011, City Church Halifax received approval by the Canadian Radio-television and Telecommunications Commission (CRTC) to operate the new FM station at Spryfield.

The station was given the call sign CIRP-FM and branded on air as Life 94.7 FM. The station has since raised its tower height to 25.5 metres (84 ft).
