= CJSI-FM =

Christian radio station in Calgary

Coordinates: 51°04′21″N 114°15′38″W

- Calgary, Alberta; Canada
- Broadcast area: Calgary Metropolitan Region
- Frequency: 88.9 MHz
- Branding: 88.9 Shine FM

Programming
- Format: Contemporary Christian music

Ownership
- Owner: Touch Canada Broadcasting

History
- First air date: December 2, 1997
- Call sign meaning: Christ Jesus Shine

Technical information
- Class: C
- ERP: 100 kW
- HAAT: 342.2 metres

Links
- Website: shinefm.com

CJSI-FM 88.9 Shine FM is a Christian radio station that broadcasts from Calgary, Alberta, Canada. The station uses the on-air brand 88.9 Shine FM, part of the Touch Canada Broadcast Network along with sister stations Shine FM Edmonton CJRY-FM and 90.5 Shine FM Red Deer CKRD-FM. Along with AM stations AM 700 The Light Calgary CJLI-AM, and AM 930 The Light Edmonton CJCA-AM. 88.9 Shine FM's broadcasts from the heart of Calgary downtown on 17th Avenue SW.

The station received approval by the CRTC in 1996.

The station plays contemporary Christian music that is "safe and fun for the whole family", featuring artists like Third Day, Mercy Me, Natalie Grant, Toby Mac, Switchfoot and Lifehouse. Weekend specialty programs include the Keep the Faith, 20 The Countdown, Adventures in Odyssey and Focus on the Family.
