= CHRI-FM =

Radio station in Ottawa

Coordinates: 45°22′52.8″N 75°37′02.7″W

- Ottawa, Ontario; Canada
- Broadcast area: National Capital Region
- Frequency: 99.1 MHz (FM)

Programming
- Format: Contemporary Christian music

Ownership
- Owner: Christian Hit Radio Inc.

History
- First air date: March 30, 1997
- Call sign meaning: "Christ" or Christian Hit Radio Inc.

Technical information
- Class: C1
- ERP: 25,297 watts (65,993 maximum)
- HAAT: 161 metres (528 ft)
- Translators: CHRI-FM-1 88.1 Cornwall; CHRI-FM-2 100.7 Pembroke

Links
- Website: chri.ca

CHRI-FM (99.1 MHz) is a Canadian non-profit, charity-status and commercial radio station, which broadcasts in Ottawa, Ontario. The station airs a Contemporary Christian music format and is owned by Christian Hit Radio, Inc.

== Network ==
The station was given approval by the CRTC on July 8, 1996 to operate a new Christian music FM station at 99.1 MHz in Ottawa. CHRI was launched on Easter Sunday 30 March 1997 by Robert DuBroy & Christian Hit Radio Inc.

=== Coverage ===
CHRI's studios are located in the Ottawa South area. The main transmitter is located in Greely, Osgoode Township on Chris Tierney Private. This station has a maximum radius of approximately 68.9 km (42¾ miles), although it can be smaller in some regions, especially the southeast.

== Transmitters ==
Rebroadcasters of CHRI-FM
City of licence	Identifier	Frequency	Power	Class	RECNet	CRTC Decision
Cornwall	CHRI-FM-1	88.1 FM	50 watts	LP	Query	2004-547
Pembroke	CHRI-FM-2	100.7 FM	22 watts	LP	Query	2005-118
Pointe-Claire, Quebec	CHRI-FM-3	90.7 FM	51 watts	A1	Query	2022-231

Cornwall has a radius of approximately 6.9 km (4¼ miles), while Pembroke has a radius of approximately 7.6 km (4¾ miles).

While driving between the three cities, there will be a time when the CHRI signal is out of reach. This is especially true for those traveling from Pembroke to Ottawa or vice versa, as they will experience over an hour of signal loss when driving at legal speeds.

On August 25, 2022, the CRTC approved an application by Christian Hit Radio Inc. to operate a new FM transmitter in Pointe-Claire, Quebec at 90.7 MHz (channel 214A1) with an effective radiated power (ERP) of 51 watts (non-directional antenna with an effective height of antenna above average terrain [EHAAT] of 36.1 metres).

=== Word FM cancelled ===
From September 2004 until August 2007, CHRI-FM sought to launch a Word FM station for the city of Ottawa. It was previously named Inspo FM, but the station was denied approval with that name in 2005. The station's purpose was to appeal to mature Christians who wanted to listen to more biblical teachings.

== Crew ==
CHRI-FM's longest lasting crew member is Brock Tozer, who has been with company since its first year 1997. He currently serves as the station's morning personality and program director.

Although CHRI-FM is clearly not a publicly traded company (ministry based), management (Bill Stevens, Brock Tozer, Dianne Van Der Putten) still report to a board of directors.

CHRI-FM has a general manager, traffic manager, ministry director, an accountant, a promotions coordinator, sales representatives, a fund-raiser, a producer, a handful of paid disc jockeys, and several volunteer disc jockeys, along with many volunteers from the community.

CHRI-FM are also supporters of Compassion Canada and World Vision.

== See also ==
- Christian radio
