= Stingray Brava =

- Stingray Brava Logo
- Country: Netherlands
- Broadcast area: Europe; Worldwide
- Headquarters: Almere, Netherlands

Programming
- Picture format: 1080i HDTV (downscaled to 16:9 576i for the SDTV feed)

Ownership
- Owner: Stingray Group (since 2015)
- Sister channels: Stingray Djazz; Stingray iConcerts; Stingray Lite TV

History
- Launched: 2006; 19 years ago (Pan-European feed); 1 July 2010; 15 years ago (Dutch feed)
- Replaced: Cultuur 7 (Flanders)
- Closed: 1 March 2019; 6 years ago
- Replaced by: Stingray Brava Europe: Closed down, effectively replaced by Stingray Classica Europe; Stingray Brava Dutch: Rebranded as a local version of Stingray Classica
- Former names: Stingray Brava Europe: Brava HDTV (2007–2013); Brava HD (2013–2014); Brava (2014–2016); Stingray Brava Dutch: Brava NL (2009–2013); Brava NL Klassiek (2013–2014); Brava (2014–2016)

Stingray Brava (formerly Brava) was a cultural television channel originated in the Netherlands, owned by the Stingray Group in Canada. The programming consisted of opera, ballet, and concertos. Productions were recorded in opera houses such as the Royal Opera House, the Teatro Real, and La Scala. The productions consisted of stage performances such as La bohème, Otello, Aida, Swan Lake, Tosca, Zoroastre and Così fan tutte.

== History ==
Brava was founded by Jur Bron and Gerard Ardesch. The pan-European Brava HDTV (now Stingray Brava Europe) was launched in 2006, and Brava NL (now Stingray Brava Dutch), which is broadcast in Dutch and focuses on Dutch contents, began on 1 July 2009. Brava was co-owned by Strengholt BV between 23 December 2011 and 31 July 2015.

On 25 November 2010, Brava launched Brava 3D, which showcased stereoscopic 3D television content across Europe as a Free-to-air channel on the Astra 3B satellite. The channel, however, was closed down on 1 August 2012.

The Canadian company Stingray Group took over Brava on 31 July 2015. Followed by Cultuur 7 in Flanders in October 2015, which merged with Brava on 1 December 2015. Both versions of Brava (all of which simplified names to Brava in 2014) were renamed as Stingray Brava at the end of 2016.

The Stingray Brava brand was abolished on 1 March 2019, in favour of Stingray Classica. Stingray acquired Classica brand and channels from Unitel in Germany in 2017.

== Versions ==
Stingray Brava Europe
Launched as Brava HDTV in 2007, it rebranded as Brava HD in 2013, before simplifying its name as Brava in 2014. This version was available in English and French across Europe. This version was closed down on 1 March 2019, and it was effectively replaced by an existing pan-European version of Stingray Classica.
Stingray Brava Dutch
Launched on 1 July 2009 as Brava NL, the Dutch version was renamed as Brava NL Klassiek in May 2013. It simplified its name as Brava in 2014. On 1 December 2015, the Dutch version of Brava replaced Cultuur 7 in Belgium (which Stingray acquired earlier in October 2015) in its former channel slot; Cultuur 7's programmes were integrated into the new Brava's schedule. This version was rebranded as Stingray Classica on 1 March 2019.

== See also ==
- Stingray Djazz: formerly Djazz TV, also operated by Brava Group, acquired together with Brava by Stingray in 2015
- Stingray Classica: a similar television channel, originated from Germany, acquired by Stingray in 2017
- Television in the Netherlands
- Digital television in the Netherlands
