= Eutelsat TV Awards =

- Sponsored by: Eutelsat
- Formerly called: Hot Bird TV Awards
- First award: 1998
- Website: eutelsattvawards.com

The Eutelsat TV Awards, also known as The ETVA, is a television prize, awarded by Eutelsat and dedicated to thematic television broadcast across Europe, Africa and the Middle East via the satellites of Eutelsat. Prizes are assigned in 10 categories: Children's, Cinema, Culture/ Education, Documentaries, Fiction/ General Entertainment, Lifestyle, Music, National Window, News and Sports. The ceremony is held in November in Venice, Italy.

== History ==
Originally known as "The HOT BIRD TV Awards", they were launched to recognise the wealth of new content generated by thematic channels at the satellites of Eutelsat and were held for the first time in 1998 in Vicenza, Italy, during the SAT Expo show. The name of the award came from the namesake satellites (“HOT BIRD”). The event has always been celebrated in Italy (from Vicenza to Turin to Venice, its present location) and through the years it has become a more international moment, gathering the world of international broadcasting. Originally the HOT BIRD TV Awards were assigned in just 7 categories: when the thematic landscape expanded, the number of categories followed suit, reaching the present number of 10. Until 2010 categories also included HDTV, then excluded because no longer an exceptional standard. In 2012 Awards have been rebranded as "The Eutelsat TV Awards". The new name expresses the inclusive character of the competition, since it is open to channels broadcasting from all Eutelsat satellites.

== The Awards ==
The ten prizes are assigned by a jury of international independent media experts: a popular award (People's Choice Award) is also assigned to the channel that receives the highest number of votes online. In 2012, for the third year, prizes were also assigned to the Best Programme and to the Best New Channel, out of all the registered channels launched at Eutelsat over the past 12 months. The Eutelsat TV Award is a bronze statue, named Gaia, which in Greek mythology is the goddess of the earth and her myth is a metaphor for satellites that silently encircle the world. Runners-up receive a plate displaying the figure of Gaia, commemorating their participation in the event.

The shortlist of channels is presented during a gala ceremony which is generally held in November in Venice.

== Past Winners ==
Editions	Categories	Winners	Country
2012	Children's	Teletoon+	Poland
2012	Cinema	Premiera	Russia
2012	Culture/Documentaries	Top Secret; Special Mention: Pashto TV	Russia; Afghanistan
2012	Fiction/General Entertainment	MBC 1 HD	UAE
2012	Lifestyle	Real Time	Italy
2012	Music	C Music TV	UK
2012	News	Sky TG24	Italy
2012	Sport	Eurosport	France
2012	Best Programme	Shakespeare from Kabul (BBC Persian Television)	UK
2012	Best New Channel of the Year	Spiegel TV Wissen	Germany
2012	Special Awards	TVM Madagascar; Sky Sport Group	Madagascar; Italy
2012	People's Choice	TRT Haber	Turkey
2011	Children's	Carousel	Russia
2011	News	BBC Arabic Television; Special Mention: TG Norba 24	United Kingdom; Italy
2011	Music	France Ô	France
2011	Sports	TRACE Sports	France
2011	Documentaries	DMAX	Germany
2011	Culture/Education	Babel; Special Mention: Rai Storia	Italy; Italy
2011	Cinema	Kino Soyuz; Sky Cinema 1 HD	Russia; Italy
2011	Fiction/General Entertainment	Sky Uno	Italy
2011	National Window	TVE Internacional; Special Mention: SMtv San Marino	Spain; San Marino
2011	Lifestyle	Rai 5; Special Mention: NRJ Paris	Italy; France
2011	People's Choice Award	MiniMini MiniMini+	Poland
2011	Best Programme	The Beethoven Project (DW-TV); Special Mention: CCN (Comedy Central Polska)	Germany; Poland
2011	Best New Channel	TG Norba 24	Italy
2010	Children's	yourfamily	Germany
2010	News	BBC World News; Current	United Kingdom; Italy
2010	Music	iConcerts	Switzerland
2010	Sports	Sky Channels for Sport Events (Olympic Games and World Cup)	Italy
2010	Documentaries	365 Days TV	Russia
2010	Culture/Education	Nostalgia	Russia
2010	HDTV	Mezzo Live HD	France
2010	Cinema-Fiction	Cinema: Kino Polska Fiction/General Entertainment: Ma Chaine Etudiante	Poland; France
2010	National Window	CCTV News	China
2010	Lifestyle	Gambero Rosso Channel; Information TV	Italy; United Kingdom
2010	People's Choice Award	TVN Warszawa	Poland
2010	Best Programme	Metro (RTR-Planeta); Special Mention: The Battle for Afghanya Valley (France 24)	Russia; France
2010	Best New Channel	SuperSport International	South Africa
2009	Children's	TV Nanny	Russia
2009	News	BBC Persian Television	United Kingdom
2009	Music	Trace Tropical; Special Mention: C Music TV	France; United Kingdom
2009	Sports	Sky Sport 24	Italy
2009	Documentaries	Vremya; Special Mention: IZ TV	Russia; Turkey
2009	Culture/Education	365 Days TV	Russia
2009	HDTV	HD suisse	Switzerland
2009	Cinema-Fiction	Cinema: Wojna i Pokój Fiction: M-Net Action	Poland; South Africa
2009	National Window	Yes Italia	Italy
2009	Lifestyle	Body In Balance	United Kingdom
2009	Eutelsat Special Awards	CCTV-9; Vesti; Tivù Sat	China; Russia; Italy
2009	SAT Expo Special Award	3D Stereoscopic Group and Ciel Ecran	Europe
2008	Children's	RaiSat Smash	Italy
2008	News	RBC TV; Recognition of the Jury: Euronews	Russia; France
2008	Music	C Music TV	United Kingdom
2008	Sports	Setanta Ireland	Ireland
2008	Documentaries	The Biography Channel	Germany
2008	Culture/Education	365 Days TV; Special Mention: Edusat	Russia; Poland
2008	HDTV	MelodyZen.tv	France
2008	Cinema-Fiction	Cinema: Propeller TV; Special Award: Sky Cinema 1 Fiction: Fox	United Kingdom; Italy; Italy
2008	National Window	TVR International	Romania
2008	Lifestyle	Alice; Türkmax; Special Mention: Fashion TV; Nigezie	Italy; Turkey; Austria; Nigeria/UK
2008	Special Award	NTV Plus; Orange TV	Russia; France
2008	People's Choice	Duna TV	Hungary
2008	Excellence Award	Planète	Poland
2007	Children's	MiniMini	Poland
2007	News	France 24; SKY TG24	France; Italy
2007	Music	La-Minor TV	Russia
2007	Sports	L’Equipe TV; Special mention: NTV-PLUS OUR Football	France; Russia
2007	Documentaries	IZ; Escales	Turkey; France
2007	Culture/Education	TVP Kultura; Special mention: ADMINISTRA.IT; TVN Med	Poland; Italy; Poland
2007	HDTV	National Geographic Channel HD; National Geographic Channel Poland	Italy; Poland
2007	Cinema-Fiction	India TV	Russia
2007	National Window	Deutsche Welle-DW TV	Germany
2007	Lifestyle	Venice Channel	Italy
2007	Special Award	Prix Italia: AB Groupe	France
2007	People's Choice	Channel One Russia Worldwide	Russia
2007	Excellence Award	RaiSat Gambero Rosso Channel	Italy
2006	Children's	Eureka! TPS Jeunesse	France
2006	News	BBC World	United Kingdom
2006	Music	MTV Brand New; Video Italia	Italy; Italy
2006	Sports	Eurosport & Eurosport 2	France
2006	Documentaries	History Channel	Italy
2006	Culture/Education	Rai Sat Nettuno 1/2; TVP Kultura	Italy; Poland
2006	HDTV	Next: HD	Italy
2006	Cinema-Fiction	Kinowelt TV; CULT; Fox Crime	Germany; Italy; Italy
2006	National Window	RTVI Channel	Russia
2006	Lifestyle	TV8 MontBlanc	France
2006	Special Award	365 Days TV; TVN24; TRACE TV; DIRECT8; TVRI	Russia; Poland; France; France; Romania
2006	People's Choice	Duna Television	Hungary
2005	Children's	ZigZap; RaiSat Ragazzi	Poland; Italy
2005	News	Sky News International	United Kingdom
2005	Music	My Music TV	Albania
2005	Sports	ESPN Classic Sport	United Kingdom
2005	Documentaries	Planet	Italy
2005	Cinema-Fiction	Kino Polska TV	Poland
2005	National Window	Deutsche Welle TV	Germany
2005	Lifestyle	Leonardo	Italy
2005	Special Award	TPS Star	France
2005	People's Choice	SKY Cinema Classic	Italy
2004	Children's	Piwi	France
2004	News	BBC World; Rainews24; Rai Med	United Kingdom; Italy; Italy
2004	Music	Mezzo; MTV Brand New	France; Italy
2004	Sports	Sky Sport	Italy
2004	Documentaries	History Channel	Italy
2004	Culture/Education	Planet; Special Mention: Rai Educational 2	Italy; Italy
2004	Cinema-Fiction	Jimmy; Europa Europa	Italy; Poland
2004	Special Award	SKY TG24; EBU; Equidia; 4 Fun TV	Italy; Switzerland; France; Poland
2003	Children's	Minimax; RaiSat Ragazzi	Poland; Italy
2003	News	Rainews24	Italy
2003	Music	Canal Clásico	Spain
2003	Sports	ESPN Classic Sport	United Kingdom
2003	Documentaries	Grandes Documentales; Voyage	Spain; France
2003	Culture/Education	Rai Nettuno Sat	Italy
2003	Cinema-Fiction	Sky Cinema Autore; TCM	Italy; France
2003	Special Award	Public Sénat	France
2002	Children's	Canal J	France
2002	News	BBC World	United Kingdom
2002	Music	Mezzo	France
2002	Sports	NTV Plus Football	Russia
2002	Documentaries	Odyssée	France
2002	Culture/Education	Cult Network Italia	Italy
2002	Cinema-Fiction	CineClassic	Italy
2002	Special Award	Canale Viaggi	Italy
2002	People's Choice	TPS Interactif	France
2001	Children's	RaiSat Ragazzi	Italy
2001	News	Sky News	United Kingdom
2001	Music	Count Down TV	Italy
2001	Sports	Calcio Stream	Italy
2001	Documentaries	Hispavision Grandes Documentales	Spain
2001	Culture/Education	Paris Première	France
2001	Cinema-Fiction	Ale Kino!	Poland
2001	National Window	Deutsche Welle TV	Germany
2001	Lifestyle	Leonardo	Italy
2001	Special Award	TPS Star; Sky Sport; CCTV	France; Italy; China
2001	People's Choice	TVL-Cartoni Umani TV	Italy
2000	Children's	Detskiy Mir	Russia
2000	News	I-Television	France
2000	Music	Mezzo	France
2000	Sports	Eurosport News	France
2000	Documentaries	National Geographic Channel	Italy
2000	Culture/Education	Paris Prèmiere; RaiSat Album	France; Italy
2000	Cinema-Fiction	Ale Kino!; Studio Universal	Poland; Italy
2000	Special Award	Alice	Italy
1999	Children's	Minimax	Poland
1999	News	LCI	France
1999	Music	Muzzik; Mizik Tropical	France; France
1999	Sports	Supersport	Greece
1999	Documentaries	Planete	Poland
1999	Culture/Education	CNI	Italian
1999	Cinema-Fiction	Nashe Kino	Russia
1999	Special Award	Gambero Rosso	Italy
1998	Children's	RaiSat Ragazzi; Teletoon	Italy; France
1998	News	BBC World; LC1	United Kingdom; France
1998	Music	Viva 1&2	Germany
1998	Sports	+ Formula 1	Italy
1998	Documentaries	Discovery	Italy
1998	Culture/Education	Arte	France
1998	Cinema-Fiction	Canal Jimmy; CineClassic	Italy; Italy
1998	Special Award	Teva	France
