= Stingray CMusic =

British television music channel

- Country: United Kingdom
- Broadcast area: Worldwide
- Headquarters: London, England, United Kingdom

Programming
- Picture format: 16:9

Ownership
- Owner: Stingray Group (C Music Entertainment Ltd.)

History
- Launched: 20 February 2007; 19 years ago
- Former names: C Music TV (until 30 November 2018)

Links
- Website: cmusic.stingray.com

Availability

Streaming media
- Canaldigitaal Live App: Watch Live

Stingray CMusic (formerly C Music TV until 30 November 2018) is a British television music channel dedicated to classical and soundtrack music videos, currently owned by Stingray Group in Canada.

The C in the channel's name stands for the genres of the channel's playlist which covers classical music (e.g. Beethoven), crossover music (e.g. Il Divo) and cinema music (original film soundtracks e.g. John Williams).

== History ==
C Music Entertainment Ltd., which operates the channel, was founded in 2007 by Julian Rigamonti (who was the head of Classic FM TV).

In May 2017, Canadian company Stingray Digital acquired C Music Entertainment Ltd. The channel was renamed as Stingray CMusic on 1 December 2018. In many countries, the channel was replaced by Stingray Music.

== Programming ==
The channel broadcasts short form music videos, and avoids long form concerts and operas traditionally associated with classical music on television.

== Availability ==
Thema (part of Canal+ Group in France) handles the worldwide distribution of the channel.

The channel is distributed to host cable, DTH satellite, IPTV and mobile phone television providers via eight contribution satellites. To Europe on the Eurobird 9A (9° East) satellite (encrypted with CONAX) and on Eutelsat 10A (10° East), to North Africa on the Eutelsat 5 West A (5.0° West) satellite, to South Africa on Eutelsat 36 B (35.9° East), to Portugal on Hispasat 1E (30.0° West) and on SES 5 (5° East), to the Middle East on Badr 5 (26.0° East) and on Intelsat 20 (68.5° East).

A high definition simulcast version (then named as C Music TV HD) was launched in 2013.

In June 2008 C Music TV launched a subscription service on their website cmusic.tv, but it was suspended by the time the channel was rebranded as Stingray CMusic in December 2018.

In December 2021, Stingray CMusic joined Freeview in the United Kingdom, becoming the third Stingray channel to be broadcast via Channelbox along with sister channels Stingray Naturescape and Qello Concerts. The Channelbox streaming portal can be found on Freeview channel 271 and via Google Play with Stingray's channels featuring alongside services such as FashionTV, Euronews and Fido TV.

== Accolades ==
As C Music TV, the channel won the Award for 'Best Music TV Channel 2008' at the Hot Bird European TV Awards which were announced on 14 November 2008 at a ceremony held at the "Scuola Grande di San Giovanni Evangelista" in Venice, Italy. It received the Hot Bird Jury's "Special Mention" Trophy in 2009 and in November 2012 it won the title of 'Best Music Channel 2012' at the (renamed) Eutelsat TV Awards 2012.
