= Stingray Classica =

Classical music television channel

- Country: Germany; Netherlands
- Broadcast area: Worldwide

Programming
- Language(s): English; French; Dutch
- Picture format: 1080i HDTV (downscaled to 16:9 576i for the SDTV feed)

Ownership
- Owner: Stingray Group (since 2017)
- Sister channels: Stingray Djazz; Stingray iConcerts; Stingray Lite TV; Stingray CMusic

History
- Launched: 1995; 30 years ago
- Replaced: Stingray Brava
- Closed: 30 April 2021; 3 years ago (South Korea)
- Replaced by: Orfeo (South Korea)
- Former names: Unitel Classica (1995-2014); Classica (2014-2018)

Links
- Website: classica.stingray.com

Availability

Streaming media
- Canal Digitaal Live App: Watch Live

Stingray Classica (formerly Classica and Unitel Classica) is a television channel devoted to classical music, opera, ballet and occasional jazz, currently owned by Stingray Group in Canada.

== History ==
Classica was owned by Unitel, a distributor of filmed classical music performances also headquartered in Germany. The channel revamped both its logo and programming on 28 May 2014.

In January 2017, Stingray Group in Quebec, Canada, acquired Classica from Unitel: In the deal, Stingray would also be able to use Unitel's library of about 1500 titles and 2000 hours of filmed contents for 11 years, however this deal was terminated and therefore the channel does not feature any content from Unitel. Stingray plans to feature Canadian productions (from both Quebec and outside Quebec) on the channel.

In late 2017, Stingray implemented a new branding and on-air look (similar to the one implemented to Stingray Brava in 2016) of newly renamed Stingray Classica to a version broadcast to Quebec, Canada. The new look was implemented to other versions of Classica operated by Stingray in 2018.

On 1 March 2019, Stingray abolished Stingray Brava brand in favour of Stingray Classica. The Dutch and French versions of Brava was rebranded as Classica, while the pan-European version of Brava was shut down and effectively replaced by that of Classica.

On 30 April 2021, Stingray Classica in South Korea was replaced by Orfeo.

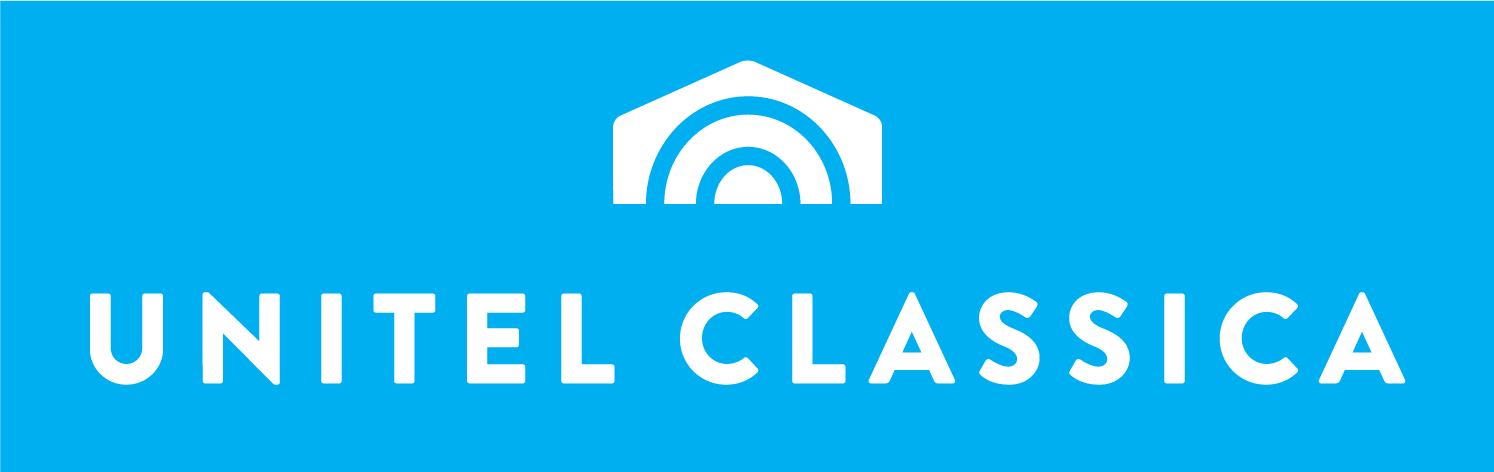
Logo of Unitel Classica until 2014

Logo of Classica from 2014-2018

Logo of Stingray Classica since Spring 2018

Alternative Logo of Stingray Classica since Spring 2018

== Versions ==
As of 2019, Stingray operates a number of versions of Stingray Classica for following areas: Germany, Netherlands and Flanders, pan-Europe, pan-Asia, and Canada.

=== Germany ===
A separate version is available to the customers of Sky in Germany.

=== Australia ===
Stingray Classica began streaming in Australia during 2022 via the 7 Network's 7 Plus free-to-air streaming portfolio of AV channels.

=== Netherlands and Flanders ===
A Dutch version, available in the Netherlands and Flanders, was originally launched as Brava NL on 1 July 2009. Stingray acquired Brava (along with its sister channel Djazz TV) on 31 July 2015. On 1 December 2015, the Dutch version of Brava replaced Cultuur 7 in Belgium (which Stingray acquired earlier in October 2015) in its former channel slot. It was rebranded as Stingray Classica on 1 March 2019.

=== France ===
A French feed was launched on 1 March 2019, replacing Stingray Brava.

=== Canada ===
In January 2017, Canada's CRTC approved Stingray's application for a version of Stingray Brava to be available in Canada as a non-Canadian television channel originating from the Netherlands. The particular version was renamed as Stingray Classica in late 2017. At launch in 2017, the channel was made available to subscribers of Vidéotron in both standard definition and high definition. After Stingray and Bell Canada expanded television distribution deal in May 2018, the channel (along with Stingray's other TV channels) was made available to Bell Fibe TV subscribers in August 2018.

== Other services ==
Stingray Classica On-Demand is available to Amazon Prime Video customers in Germany and the United Kingdom, and Amazon Channels customers in the United States.

== Related channels ==
As of 2018, Stingray's acquisition of the channel does not affect the following channels yet:

- Classica HD, in Italy
- Classica Japan: Launched on 1 January 1998, the Japanese version of the channel is operated by Tohokushinsha Film Corporation under the license. It features programming from the German channel, along with Japanese productions.

== See also ==
- Unitel GmbH & Co.KG
- Stingray Brava: a similar television channel, originated from the Netherlands, acquired by Stingray in 2015.
