= Stingray Hits! =

- Stingray Hits! logo
- Country: Canada, Australia
- Broadcast area: International
- Headquarters: Montreal, Quebec

Ownership
- Owner: Stingray Group
- Sister channels: PalmarèsADISQ par Stingray; Stingray Lite TV

History
- Launched: February 22, 2018 (Belgium); June 6, 2018 (Canada); September 2nd 2025 (Australia)

Links
- Website: Stingray Hits!

Stingray Hits is a Canadian French language music television channel owned by Stingray Group. The channel broadcasts music videos from pop, pop-rock, and dance hits primarily from current day's artists, along with past artists. The channel broadcasts in multiple languages depending on the country of operation, currently in French and Dutch.

In September 2025, Stingray Hits began broadcasting in Australia on the Fetch TV platform.

== History ==
On February 21, 2018, Proximus announced that it had reached an agreement with Stingray Digital to launch Stingray Hits on Proximus' television service in Belgium with two channels, one in French and one in Dutch. Several months later, the channel launched in Canada in French on the Vidéotron service. Initially launched in high definition, the channel launched a standard definition feed later when it launched on Bell Fibe TV in August 2018. The launch of Stingray Hits! in Canada comes three years after the closure of bpm:tv, another channel dedicated to dance music, by its former owner Stornoway Communications.

In March 2020, after initially operating as an exempted service in Canada, the CRTC approved a formal discretionary service license for Stingray Hits. Although submitted by Stingray as being a French-language service, the CRTC classified the channel as an English-language service due to a determination that only 40% of the channel's content (including music videos and spoken word content) was actually in French, however, the channel's on-air imaging and programming is still nominally presented in French. On June 2, 2021, the CRTC approved an application classifying the Canadian channel as a French language service, mandating at least 50% of the music videos broadcast on the channel be French.
