= Eric Boyko =

Canadian entrepreneur (born 1970)

- Born: 1970 (age 55–56); Montreal, Quebec, Canada
- Education: McGill University
- Occupations: Founder, president & CEO, Stingray Group Inc. (2007-present)
- Years active: 1991–present
- Website: stingray.com

Eric Boyko (born 1970) is a Canadian tech entrepreneur and the founder, president and CEO of Stingray Group.

== Early life and education ==
Boyko was born and raised in Montreal, Quebec, to a Quebecois mother and Ukrainian father. He earned a bachelor of commerce degree from McGill University in 1992, and became a certified general accountant in 1997.

== Career ==
=== Campus Gourmet and eFundraising.com ===
Boyko started his first business, Campus Gourmet, in 1991 at the age of 19. The company sold precooked meals to students at McGill University. He then founded the online fundraising company Universal Fundraising Group with a $2,000 loan from the Business Development Bank of Canada. It was rebranded as eFundraising.com in 1998, and sold to ZapMe in 2000 for $25 million.

=== Stingray Group Inc. ===
In 2007, Boyko and Alexandre Taillefer founded digital music provider Stingray Digital Media Group, with Boyko serving as president and CEO since the company's inception. The company sells commercial-free music streams to cable and satellite television providers to add to their subscribers' packages, as well as a music streaming app and an online service for consumers and businesses. Unlike many of its streaming music competitors, Stingray uses human curators rather than algorithms to generate playlists. It was launched with the $6 million purchase of karaoke company Soundchoice, which was then renamed The Karaoke Channel. A year later, Stingray purchased music-streaming TV channel Galaxie from the Canadian Broadcasting Corporation for $65 million, and renamed it Stingray Music.

The company went public on June 3, 2015, on the Toronto Stock Exchange.

In December 2018, the company officially changed its name to Stingray Group, Inc.
