= Amici come noi =

- Directed by: Enrico Lando
- Produced by: Pietro Valsecchi
- Starring: Pio e Amedeo
- Distributed by: Medusa Film
- Release date: 20 March 2014
- Running time: 89 minutes
- Country: Italy
- Language: Italian

Amici come noi (lit. 'Friends like us') is a 2014 Italian comedy film directed by Enrico Lando.

== Cast ==
- Pio D'Antini as Pio
- Amedeo Grieco as Amedeo
- Alessandra Mastronardi as Rosa
- Massimo Popolizio as uncle Ettore
- Maria Di Biase as Marika
- Mariela Garriga as Laura
- Mohamed Zouaoui as the pusher
- Alessandra Sarno as Stefania
- Nicola Valenzano as Giulio
- Giovanni Mancini as Mario
- Anna Rita Del Piano as Angela
- Monica Volpe as Floriana
- Manuela Spartà as Carmen
- Sara Brajovic as Alina

== Production ==
The film was shot primarily in Monte Sant'Angelo. Other cities in which it was shot are Foggia, Milan, Rome and Amsterdam.
