= Qello =

Video on demand service owned by Stingray Digital and headquartered in New York City

- Type: Subsidiary
- Industry: Video hosting
- Founded: 2010
- Founder: Brian Lisi; Rich Johnson; Bob Frank
- Headquarters: Montreal, Canada
- Products: Digital streaming of concert and music documentaries
- Parent: Stingray Group
- Website: www.qello.com

Qello Concerts (also known as Qello, Stingray Qello) is an American-based entertainment company founded in 2010, in New York, by Brian Lisi, Bob Frank, and Richard Johnson. Qello is the parent company of digital streaming service Qello Concerts, and over-the-top content service provider Qello Media Solutions. Qello Concerts is a digital streaming music service specializing in on-demand concert films and music documentaries. In 2016, Qello Concerts added live streaming events and original programming. It was acquired by Stingray Group in January 2018.

== Background ==
Qello Concerts licenses long-form concerts, documentaries, behind the scenes footage and interviews from both major and independent music labels. Qello Concerts is available in more than 160 countries. Qello Concerts entered the film and television industry in 2016, debuting its first series, Evolution of a Song. The platform also began its live streaming events initiative in 2016 offering live stream events including Slightly Stoopid with Bob Weir at TRI Studios, the 2016 Lockn' Festival, and Umphrey's McGee’s Chucktown Ball.

Qello launched Qello Media Solutions in 2015 as a white label digital streaming service provider with a variety of media clients including Acorn TV.

In January 2018, Canadian streaming media company Stingray Group announced that they had acquired Qello. The Qello Concerts service has since been renamed "Stingray Qello".

The Qello executive team includes Brian Lisi as CEO, Bob Frank as President of Qello Concerts, Richard Johnson as Director of Business Development and Chief Revenue Officer, and Nicole Johnson as Director of Communications.

== History ==
In May 2011, Qello was given one of Google's Developer Sandbox spots at Google I/O.

In June 2011, RightsFlow, a licensing and royalty service provider, entered into an agreement with Qello, providing them with a service for royalty reporting, ensuring that rights holders are properly compensated for the use of their creative work. A percentage of all monthly revenue goes directly to the content provider.

In May 2012, Qello and EMI music entered an agreement, expanding Qello's library with content from EMI's library as well. EMI was a British multinational recording and publishing company.

In April 2013, Qello launched a music blog designed to feature original content called Inside the Q. Ben Fong-Torres, former editor for Rolling Stone, is the Senior Editor. Inside the Q bloggers introduce Center Stage and Breakout artists being featured on Qello, as well as information about New Music Tuesdays, the apps new releases. The blog also has reviews of the concerts and documentaries featured on Qello with Fong-Torres's accounts of personal encounters and interviews with many of the artists.

As of July 2014, Qello has 3 million registered users in more than 160 countries.

== Features ==
Users can access Qello via its mobile app available on iOS and Android, its YouTube channel, Amazon’s Kindle Fire, Windows Mobile, and Sony and Samsung Smart TVs. Users can log in using their Facebook or Twitter account, or by creating a login. If using a device supporting iTunes, Qello scans the users iTunes library and suggests bands and videos the user may want to watch but had not previously purchased. It also gives iOS users access to purchase audio tracks of artists directly through iTunes. Qello allows users to create and share custom set lists. All users get unlimited access to Qello TV, which has more than 30 channels of non-stop concert moments; they also get one track from every concert film. Qello also offers an All-Access Pass giving subscribers unlimited access to every full-length concert and documentary in the library.

== Platforms ==
Qello is also available on Sony and Samsung smart TVs, Kindle Fire, and iOS and Android devices.

In December 2011, Qello was added to Google TV, and in May 2013, YouTube announced it would be featuring Qello as one of two channels launched in its new subscription channels. This partnership allows YouTube users to access all of the content from Qello. Soon after, in June 2013, Qello was added to Apple TV, making Qello available everywhere that Apple TV is available. The following month, July 2013, Qello was added among the Chromecast apps. In April 2014, the Qello app became available for Roku devices. Qello was also a launch partner on the Amazon Fire TV. In September 2014, Qello became available on PlayStation 4.

Qello was previously available on PlayStation 3 and PlayStation 4 via the PlayStation Network, but the service has since been suspended on these platforms. On May 4, 2016, PlayStation users in North America were emailed notifying them of the suspension of service and were instead encouraged to use other platforms or the paid-service Amazon Prime. As of May 6, 2016, however, the Qello website still lists PS3, PS4, and PS Vita as supported devices.

In 2020, Qello Concerts was made available via STV Player, the streaming service of Scottish broadcaster STV. Viewers could watch a live-stream of the channel, as well as view a selection of concerts on demand. Qello's streamed channel was removed from STV Player in 2021, however, a selection of concerts are available to view in the "Music" section.

In 2021, Qello Concerts joined Freeview in the United Kingdom along with sister channel Stingray Naturescape. The channels can be found on channel 271 via the Channelbox streaming portal alongside Now 70s, Now 90s and Clubland TV.
