= Stingray Music =

Canadian audio company, launched 1997

- Country: Canada
- Broadcast area: National
- Headquarters: Montreal, Quebec

Ownership
- Owner: Canadian Broadcasting Corporation (1997–2011); Stingray Group (2011–present)

History
- Launched: September 10, 1997
- Former names: Galaxie (1997–2014)

Links
- Website: music.stingray.com/en_CA/

Availability

Streaming media
- Service(s): Frndly TV

Stingray Music is a Canada-based international multi-platform audio service that broadcasts continuous streaming music and other forms of audio on multiple channel feeds. The service is owned by Stingray Group. It was originally founded in 1997 as Galaxie by the Canadian Broadcasting Corporation before it was acquired by Stingray in 2011; but adopted its present name in 2014.

While a song is playing on the audio, channel name, artist, song, Stingray's web address and genre-themed clip art are displayed on every music channel.

== History ==
Original logo of Galaxie from 1997 to 2000. From 2000 to 2003, the orange circle was removed.

The service's beginnings in Canada started in December 1995, when the Canadian Broadcasting Corporation was granted approval from the Canadian Radio-television and Telecommunications Commission (CRTC) to launch a national pay audio service named Galaxie consisting of 30 channels in both English and French.

The service launched as Galaxie on September 10, 1997, under the ownership of the Canadian Broadcasting Corporation by offering 30 music channels.

Logo of Galaxie from 2003 to 2009.

Because of service duplication, in 2002, Galaxie and Max Trax (a similar television service owned by Corus Entertainment at the time) agreed to provide a joint 40-channel audio distribution service to satellite and digital cable television providers called Galaxie Max Trax. The package consisted of 20 Galaxie and 20 Max Trax channels.

At the end of December 2008, Stingray Digital held a sound broadcasting license from the CRTC. On February 13, 2009, Corus Entertainment sold its equipment and the Max Trax brand to Stingray so that the service was offered without interruption until Stingray launched its own service.

Galaxie logo used from 2009 to 2014.

On October 1, 2009, the Max Trax brand was discontinued, like its owners, Stingray Digital and the CBC merged the two services together under the Galaxie brand. Stingray Digital, who had been operating as the exclusive sales and development agent for Galaxie since late 2007, officially took over as managing partner in the service upon completion of merger.

According to Canadian Radio-television and Telecommunications Commission (CRTC) records, Stingray purchased Galaxie from the CBC in May 2011 for a reported $65 million.

On November 18, 2011, Stingray announced it had expanded the number of Galaxie channels available to be offered to distributors to 100. On January 10, 2012, Shaw Cable was the first distributor in Canada to launch 15 of those additional channels, the majority of which were focused on various genres of multicultural and multilingual music. The full slate of new channels were rolled out to consumers when SaskTel became the first distributor to carry all 100 channels in May 2012.

On September 30, 2014, Stingray announced it was uniting all of its properties under the Stingray brand, effective immediately, with Galaxie rebranded as Stingray Music, albeit with audio channels still Galaxie branded until early 2015 and the OnDemand music video service is still branded Galaxie with only some music videos Stingray branded.

In 2014, Stingray Music launched a mobile app. The app was later updated in 2015 with 1,500+ personalized channels known as "Vibes" and these channels are also available later on some TV providers, for instance Bell MTS.

In 2019, it was announced that the Stingray Music's mobile app was made available for free in the U.S. and Canada. Users can choose to listen to the ad-supported service or pay $0.99 (made-for-students discount)/$3.99 to access the premium service that was already made available to participating TV providers' subscribers. Unlimited skips are also available, whereas before only 6 skips were authorized hourly.

In August 2020, the company announced the launch of Stingray Music - with six leading platforms - in the United States.

In September 2020, it was announced that Stingray's holdings in the company AppDirect, which was about to launch its own initial public offering, were valued at C$26 million.

== Programming ==
Stingray Music primarily broadcasts music across over 150 uninterrupted channel feeds available worldwide, carefully curated by 25 Montreal-based music programmers and 175 more globally. Each channel is programmed around a particular musical genre or theme, and carries a playlist containing somewhere between 150 and over 3,000 songs. The channels cover a wide range of genres and sub-genres including pop, rock, jazz, electronic, classical, and more. Programming is primarily in English, however, multiple channels feature programming in French, Spanish, Punjabi, among others. The majority of channels broadcasts music, however, other audio feeds are available that broadcast instrumentals, nature sounds, and others.

Stingray Music programmers select the music based on music trends and feedback from viewers. The sequence of tracks and the tracks themselves are constantly updated and scheduled at exact times using professional computer programs, with no block of programming repeats exactly itself and no random playing.

== A sample list of channels ==
Note: Ratings of the TV-MA channels are sourced from U.S.'s AT&T U-verse, if they are carried on the provider (such channels are noted in asterisks). Channels with (G) note denotes it (or its format) has been carried since the beginning. Channels with (M) note denotes it's been carried over from Max Trax after the two services merged. The channels offered varies from one provider to another.

- (G) Adult Alternative*
- Afro Beat
- All Day Party
- Alt-Country / Americana
- Alt Rock Classics
- (G) Alternative*
- Alternative Dance
- Around the World
- (G) Baroque
- Bass, Breaks & Beats
- Big Band
- Bluegrass
- Bollywood Hits
- Broadway
- Canadian Indie*
- Canadiana
- Caribbean Vintage Vibes
- (G) Chamber Music
- (M) Christian Pop & Rock
- Chillout
- (G) Classic Masters
- Classic Hip-Hop
- Classic R&B & Soul
- (G) Classic Rock
- Classical Calm
- Classical India
- Cocktail Lounge
- Cool Jazz
- (G) Country Classics
- Dance Classics
- (G) Dance Clubbin'*
- Dancefloor Fillers
- Dancehall Session
- Deep House
- Drive
- (G) Easy Listening
- Eclectic Electronic*
- (G) En Marge
- Euro Hits
- Éxitos del Momento
- Éxitos Regional Mexicanos
- Éxitos Tropicales
- (G) Flashback '70s
- Folk Roots
- (G) Franco Country
- Franco Rétro
- (G) Franco Pop
- Freedom
- Gospel
- Greatest Hits
- Groove
- Guangdong
- Hard Rock*
- Headbangers*
- Heavy Metal*
- Hindi Gold
- (G) Hit List
- Hip Hop*
- (M) Hip-Hop/R&B*
- (G) Hot Country
- Indie Classics
- Indie Rock
- Jammin'
- Jazz Latino
- (G) Jazz Masters
- (G) Jazz Now
- (G) Jukebox Oldies
- (G) Kids' Stuff
- Latin Lounge
- (M) Le Palmarès
- Mando Popular
- (M) Maximum Party
- (G) Mousses Musique
- Motown
- Nature
- Nederpop
- New Age
- No Fences
- (G) Nostalgie
- Nothin' but '90s
- OMG
- Opéra Plus
- (G) Pop Adult
- Popcorn
- (G) Popular Classical
- Punjabi
- (G) Remember the '80s
- Reggaeton*
- Retro Latino
- Retro R&B
- Ritmos Urbanos*
- Revival 60's - 70's
- Rewind 80's - 90's
- (M) Rock*
- Rock en Español
- Romance Latino
- Salsa/Merengue
- Samba & Pagode
- Soca Motion
- Solo para Peques
- Sounds of South India
- (G) Souvenirs
- Soul Storm
- Southern Jams
- (M) Smooth Jazz
- (M) Swinging Standards
- Swiss Hits
- Tango
- Tagalog
- Tejano y Tex-Mex
- The Asian Flavour
- (G) The Blues
- The Chill Lounge
- The Spa
- Today's K-Pop
- Total Hits Austria
- Total Hits Brazil
- Total Hits France
- Total Hits Italy
- Total Hits Germany
- Total Hits Holland
- Total Hits Poland
- Total Hits Russia
- Total Hits Spain
- Total Hits UK
- Trance*
- Viva México
- World Carnival
- Y2K

=== Defunct channels ===
- Ambient (replaced by The Chill Lounge)
- Bande à part (renamed Franco Attitude)
- Blues
- Blues' Street (merged with Blues to form The Blues)
- Contemporary Christian (renamed The Light)
- CMT (absorbed into Hot Country)
- Dance (merged with Rave to form Dance Clubbin')
- Franco Attitude (renamed En Marge in 2020)
- Franco Énergie (absorbed into Franco Pop)
- Franco Relax
- Gold Rock (renamed Classic Rock)
- Instrumental/New Age (renamed The Spa; New Age later returned as a standalone channel)
- Latin Pop (renamed Éxitos del Momento in 2020)
- Latino Tejano (renamed Tejano y Tex-Mex in 2020)
- Latino Tropical (renamed Éxitos Tropicales in 2020)
- Latino Urbana (renamed Ritmos Urbanos in 2020)
- Le Top Détente (renamed Le Palmarès in 2020)
- Master Works (absorbed into Classic Masters)
- Max Trax Party (renamed Maximum Party)
- Memories (absorbed into Easy Listening)
- Musique Bout'Choux (absorbed into Mousses Musique)
- Rap/Hip-Hop (absorbed into The Beat)
- Rave
- Regional Mexican (renamed Éxitos Regional Mexicanos in 2020)
- Rock and Roll (renamed Jukebox Oldies)
- Rock Alternative (renamed Alternative in 2020)
- The '70s (absorbed into Flashback '70s in 2009)
- The '80s (renamed Remember the '80s)
- The '90s (renamed Nothin' but '90s)
- The Beat (renamed Urban Beats)
- The Edge (absorbed into Rock Alternative)
- The Light (renamed Christian Pop & Rock in 2020)
- Treehouse (absorbed into Kids' Stuff)
- UK Chart-Toppers (renamed Total Hits UK)
- Urban Beats (renamed Hip-Hop/R&B in 2020)
- World (renamed Around the World)

== Artist development ==
Stingray Music sponsors a number of "Stingray Rising Stars Awards" (formerly Galaxie Rising Stars) presented at a variety of music festivals and awards presentations each year, including Canadian Music Week's Indie Awards, the East Coast Music Awards, and the Western Canadian Music Awards, among numerous others. Stingray also sponsors an annual Songs from the Heart competition for new and emerging songwriters. The Colleen Peterson Songwriting Award is presented to the winner of the competition.

== International ==
=== Americas ===
Stingray Music is also carried in both the United States and the Caribbean via various television providers. Expansion began in 2009 with the addition of Stingray to various smaller market television providers in the U.S. and in 2010, Galaxie was added to WIV Cable TV in the Turks and Caicos as well as Trinidad and Tobago. In April 2011, Galaxie further expanded their reach in the US when American cable company Insight Communications chose Galaxie as their new radio provider to replace MTV Networks' defunct Urge service across their service area in Indiana, Kentucky, and Ohio. Galaxie further expanded into the Caribbean with the launch onto Jamaican television provider Telstar Cable. In October 2011, Galaxie was further added to more US television services. Galaxie furthered its expansion into the Caribbean and Latin American regions with its launch on various television providers in a number of different countries including St. Marteen, Costa Rica, Dominican Republic, Guatemala, and 10 others.

On October 29, 2014, Stingray Music launched on AT&T U-verse, adding approximately six million subscribers. In December 2018, Altice USA reached an agreement with Stingray to replace its main rival, Music Choice, on its cable systems (including former Cablevision systems in New York City, and Suddenlink). At the same time, Stingray abandoned its bid to acquire Music Choice.

=== Europe ===
Stingray purchased the European operations of Music Choice in 2011, which rebranded as Stingray Music in April 2015.

In 2014, Stingray Digital acquired Dutch premium service XLnt Radio (along with Lite TV) from the Archibald Media Group.

=== Oceania ===
In Australia, Stingray partners with pay television provider Foxtel to offer a suite of audio channels under the name Foxtel Music via the latter's cable and satellite services. Foxtel subscribers also have access to the Stingray Music app, allowing users to stream the channels on their mobile device.

During 2022 Australia's 7 Network, through its 7 Plus internet suite of AV services, commenced free-to-air streaming of five 24/7 Stingray-branded video music channels comprising Qello Concerts (rock), dJazz (contemporary jazz), Karaoke, Classica (classical music) and Naturescape (featuring world nature video photography set to peaceful music).
