= Unitel GmbH & Co. KG =

German classical music producer

Unitel GmbH & Co. KG is a leading production company and distributor of filmed classical music performances, based in Oberhaching (Upper Bavaria), Germany.

Unitel stems from Cosmotel, a company established by Leo Kirch and Herbert von Karajan in 1964. Cosmotel broke up over the issue of artistic control, and Kirch created a new company named Unitel in 1966. As of 2003, Unitel is a part of Jan Mojto's businesses. Its catalogue is regarded as one of the most important catalogues of classical music, with more than 2,500 productions. Unitel is the exclusive production company for the Salzburg Festival and other arts institutions and of artist such as Christian Thielemann and Daniel Barenboim.

Unitel previously owned Classica, a speciality television channel showcasing classical music performances, also based in Germany. At one point, both the company and Classica were renamed Unitel Classica, but the two entities reverted to their previous individual brand in 2014. In January 2017, Stingray Group in Canada acquired Classica from Unitel: In the deal, Stingray would also be able to utilise Unitel's library of about 1,500 titles and 2,000 hours of filmed content for 11 years, however this deal has been terminated and therefore Classica does not feature any titles from Unitel.

Since 2016 Unitel operates together with the ORF Unitel myfidelio.at, an SVOD OTT service dedicated to classical music.
