= Stingray Now 4K =

- Stingray Now 4K logo
- Country: Canada
- Broadcast area: National
- Headquarters: Montreal, Quebec

Ownership
- Owner: Stingray Group

History
- Launched: November 2017

Links
- Website: www.stingray.com/consumer/brands/stingray-now4k

Stingray Now 4K is a Canadian English language Category B television channel owned by Stingray Digital. The channel broadcasts music videos in 4K resolution (ultra-high-definition television) from various genres including pop, dance, hip-hop, indie, Latin pop, adult rock, alternative, and more.

== History ==
On June 23, 2017, Stingray Digital announced the upcoming launch of an unnamed television channel that will broadcast music videos in 4K resolution; a third 4K channel in the Stingray portfolio including Stingray Ambiance 4K and Stingray Festival 4K.

In October 2017, during the annual television trade show, MIPCOM, Stingray Digital announced the launch of Stingray Now 4K, available for global distribution.

Initially expected to launch in July 2017, the channel launched in November 2017 on Rogers Cable in Canada.
