= Telenorba =

- Country: Italy
- Broadcast area: Italy
- Affiliates: Teledue; TG Norba 24; Radionorba TV

Programming
- Language: Italian
- Picture format: 16:9 576i (SDTV); 1080i (HDTV upscaled)

History
- Launched: 23 April 1976

Links
- Website: Norbaonline.it

Availability

Terrestrial
- Free to air (Apulia, Basilicata): Channel 10

Telenorba is a generalist terrestrial television station founded in 1975 by businessman Luca Montrone alongside Vito Zivoli in Conversano, city born from the ashes of the former city known as Norba in Roman, and part of Gruppo Norba. The station's headquarters, in Conversano, are located where the vineyards of Montrone's family used to be.

== History ==
Initially receivable only in Conversano, its broadcasts quickly spread up to all of Apulia and border regions thanks to the acquisition of television points, towers and transmitters. The station initially operated using the provisional name Canale 41 in reference to its frequency,

In its early years, the station produced long documentaries recorded at Itis di Monopoli, of which Montrone was its president, regarding the chemical processes and physical experiments illustrated to the students at the institute's laboratory, while in the 80s, the station expands its advertising to cater to small and media companies of the region. The news operation ended up becoming particularly competitive to RAI's regional news bulletins. This also led to public-private co-operation, where Telenorba's technical infrastructure was also used for the regional programs and events seen on Apulia opt-outs on RAI Tre.

In 1984, it entered the Euro TV circuit owned by Calisto Tanzi, until its closure in 1987. With its closure, it moved to Italia 7, de facto owned by Fininvest, however, its president turned out to be Telenorba founder Luca Montrone himself, but later handed its affiliation to Telepuglia in the early 90s.

In 1994, Telenorba Shqiptare was born, the Albanian counterpart of the network, headquartered in Tirana. Among its successful programs were reruns of Colpo Grosso, cartoons and telenovelas. The Albanian version closed in 2007. Later, it joined Junior TV and Stream News.

Its popularity was consolidated thanks to figures such as softcore actress Ilona Staller (better known as Cicciolina), who presented a late night entertainment show, and Lilli Carati, whereas Toti e Tata, Fabio & Mingo, Gianni Ciardo, Checco Zalone and Pio e Amedeo became popular, even at a national scale, after starting their careers on Telenorba. Particularly prolific was its ability to produce sitcoms, such as Very Strong Family (actually taken from Teleregione Color), Italo, Piccoli segreti and Catene, but also more serious fiction, such as Mino Barbarese's L'Ariamara.

In 2013, Titta De Tommasi, former artistic director of Radionorba, and from 2007, Telenorba's artistic director, left Gruppo Norba. In 2014, following the arrival of Leo Zani as consultant to network director Marco Montrone, Luca's son, the network signs an agreement with Mediaset for the usage of its audiovisual archives, for which Zani previously worked, while also preparing new productions, such as a reality show featuring Albano Carrisi, Casa Carrisi.

After a September 2014 decision by Agcom grouping all high-level regional channels in the 10-19 area of the terrestrial platform, the number 7 was removed from the station's nomenclature, reverting to just Telenorba.

Since 2016, its director is Antonio Azzalini. Journalist Michele Cucuzza presented an afternoon program there, Buon Pomeriggio, from 2016 to 2019. For the 2017-2018 Serie C season, Telenorba gained the rights of the Free Local Package of matches for Puglia and Basilicata.

== Bibliography ==
- Joseph Baroni (2005). Dizionario della televisione: i programmi della televisione commerciale dagli esordi a oggi. Milano: Raffaello Cortina Editore.
- Giancarlo Dotto; Alberto Piccinini (2006). Il mucchio selvaggio. Mondadori. ISBN 88-04-53952-6.
- Aldo Grasso (2008). Enciclopedia della televisione (3rd ed.). Garzanti Editore. ISBN 978-88-11-50526-6.
