= Pio e Amedeo =

Italian comedy duo

Pio D'Antini
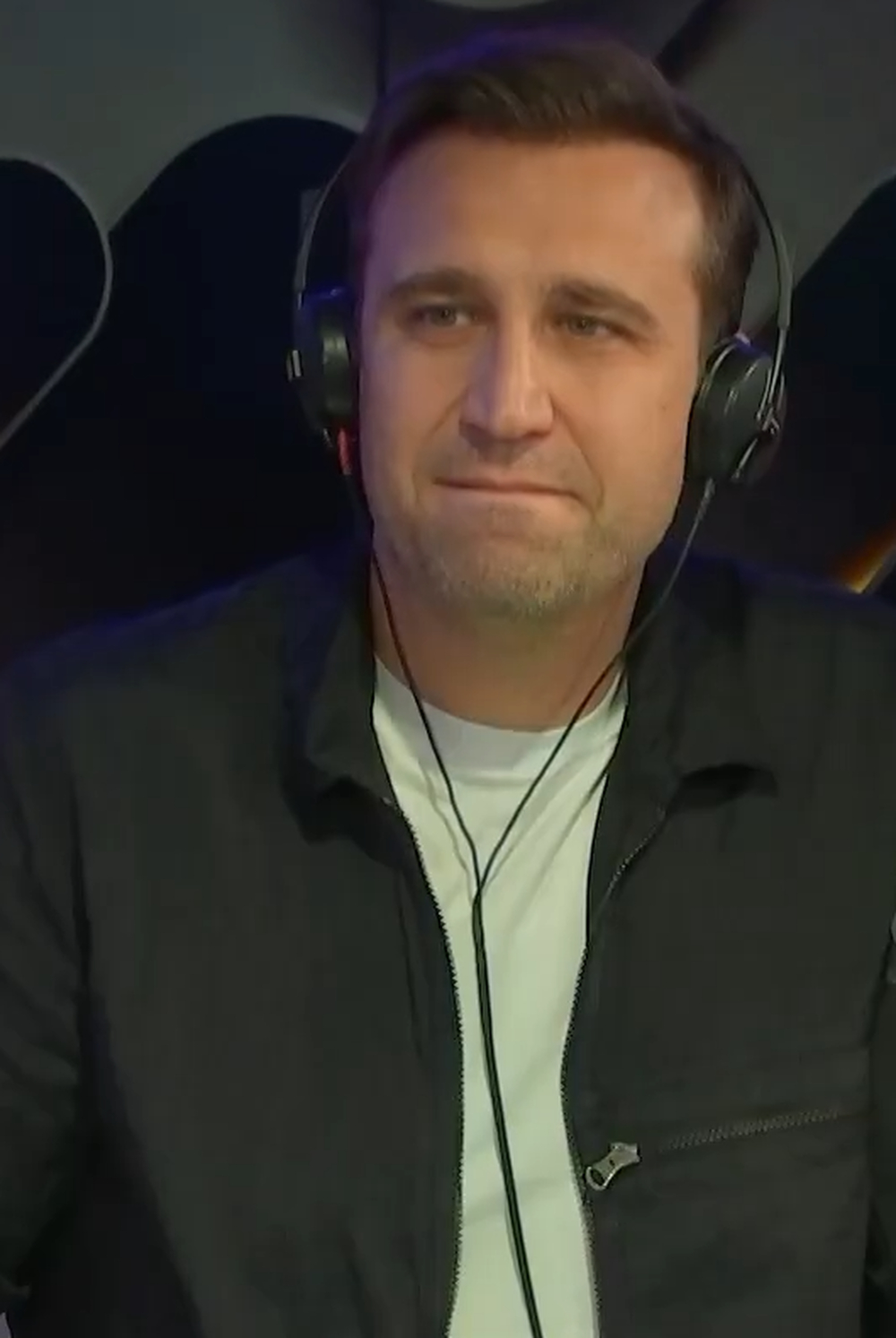
- D'Antini in December 2025
- Born: August 20, 1983 (age 42); Foggia, Italy
- Occupation: Comedian
- Height: 1.81 m (5 ft 11 in)

Amedeo Grieco
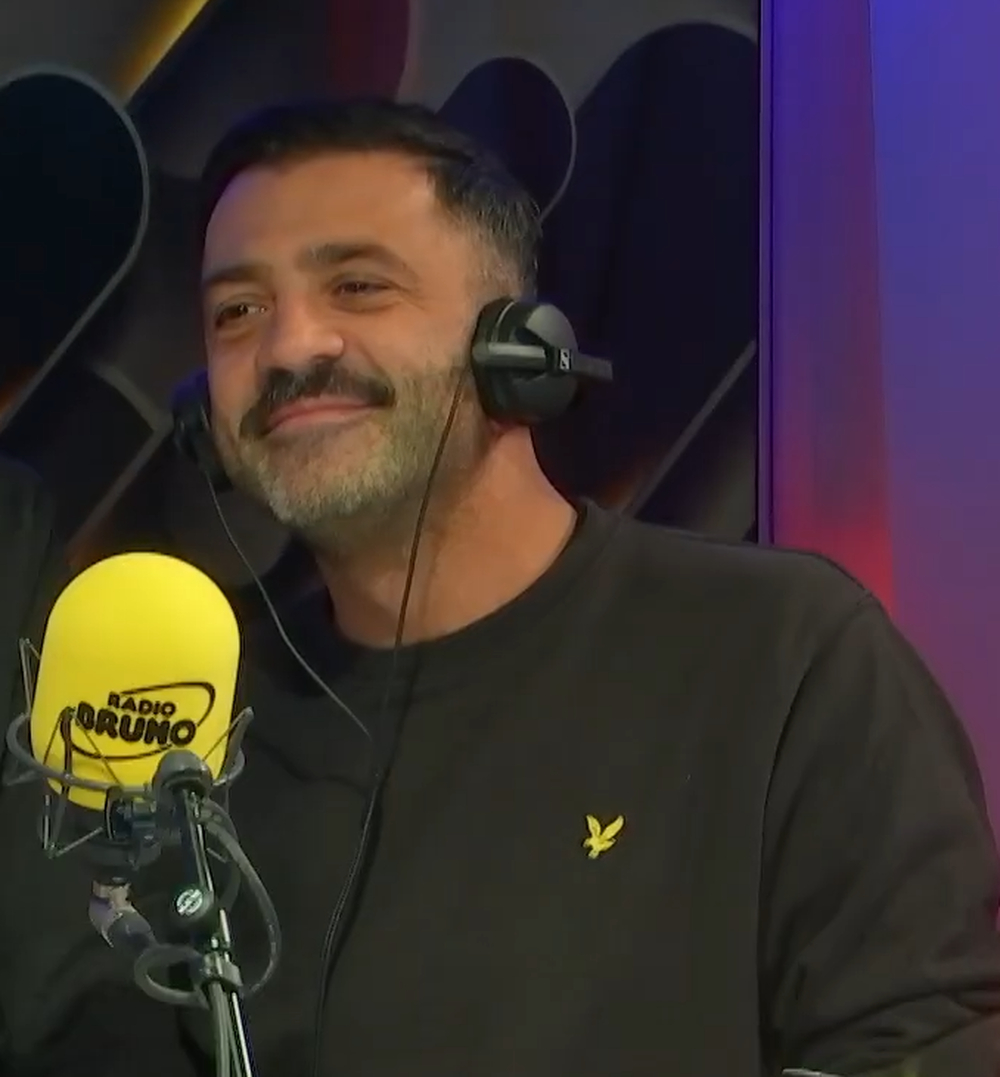
- Grieco in December 2025
- Born: August 25, 1983 (age 42); Foggia, Italy
- Occupation: Comedian
- Height: 1.77 m (5 ft 10 in)

Pio D'Antini (born August 20, 1983) and Amedeo Grieco (born August 25, 1983) are an Italian comedy duo who work on stage, film, television and books as Pio e Amedeo.

== Filmography ==
- Amici come noi (2014)
- What's Your Sign? (2014)
- Belli ciao (2022)

== TV ==
- Occhio di Bue (Telefoggia, 2004)
- U' Tub (Telenorba, 2008)
- Sbattiti (Telenorba, 2009)
- Stiamo tutti bene (Rai 2, 2011)
- Base Luna (Rai 2, 2011)
- Le Iene (Italia 1, 2012-)
- Emigratis (Italia 1, 2016–2018; (Canale 5, 2022))
- Amici di Maria De Filippi (Canale 5, 2019, 2021) Regular guests
- Felicissima sera (Canale 5, 2021, 2023)

== Radio ==
- Password, with Nicoletta (RTL 102.5, 2013)
