= Teledue =

- Country: Italy
- Broadcast area: Italy
- Affiliates: Telenorba; TG Norba 24; Radionorba TV

Programming
- Language: Italian
- Picture format: 16:9 576i (SDTV); 1080i (HDTV upscaled)

History
- Launched: 1981

Links
- Website: Norbaonline.it

Availability

Terrestrial
- Free to air (Apulia, Basilicata): Channel 12

Teledue is Gruppo Norba's second channel, known between 2005 and 2014 as Telenorba 8. Like with its main channel Telenorba, it also regularly makes it in the rankings of the most watched regional channels. It also had its own programming tactics: it aired the afternoon edition of TG Norba at 2pm, at a time when a predominantly male audience returns from work, and had no interest in the telenovelas broadcast on the main channel.

== History ==
Teledue started broadcasting in 1981.

In 2005, Telenorba rebranded its channels, coinciding with the launch of digital terrestrial television in the region. The channel withdrew the classic Teledue nomenclature and adopted Telenorba 8, broadcasting on LCN 8. This arrangement continued until 2014, as Agcom planned to review slots 7, 8 and 9 for national allocations. In May 2012, consequence of the analog switch-off, Telenorba 8 moved to channel 11. In September 2014, the regulator decided that channels 10 to 19 should be used for regional networks, which infuriated Telenorba. In addition, the national slot for channel 8 was given to MTV8 from 2015 (renamed TV8 in 2016). Telenorba appealed the decision in 2015.

On 15 November 2014, Telenorba 8 reverted to Teledue following the new look of the Gruppo Norba channels. Emphasis was put on classic programming while the main Telenorba channel would concentrate on local programming.

On 15 November 2023, Teledue converts to high definition, becoming available exclusively in this format.
