= Stingray Djazz =

Dutch cultural television channel

Stingray DJAZZ
- Country: Netherlands
- Broadcast area: Europe; Worldwide

Programming
- Languages: Dutch; French
- Picture format: 1080i HDTV (downscaled to 16:9 576i for the SDTV feed)

Ownership
- Owner: Stingray Group
- Sister channels: Stingray Classica; Stingray iConcerts; Stingray Lite TV

History
- Launched: 22 June 2012; 14 years ago
- Former names: Djazz.TV (2012-2016)

Links
- Website: Stingray Djazz

Availability

Streaming media
- Ziggo GO (Netherlands): ZiggoGO.tv (Europe only)
- 7 Plus: 7Plus.com.au (Australia only)
- Pluto TV: Pluto TV (United States)

Stingray DJAZZ is a Dutch cultural music channel aimed at the European market which launched as DJAZZ.TV on 22 June 2012. The programming consists of jazz, soul, gospel, blues, and world music, like reggae, tango, and Brazilian music. The productions consist of jazz festivals, jazz concerts, and documentaries. The channel was founded by Rob Overman and Robert Rutten. Since 31 July 2015, the channel has been owned and operated by the Canadian company Stingray Group. In October 2016 it changed its name to Stingray DJAZZ. A version of the channel is available in the United States on Pluto TV.

== See also ==
- Stingray Brava: formerly Brava, also operated by Brava Group, acquired together with Djazz TV by Stingray in 2015
- Television in the Netherlands
- Digital television in the Netherlands
