= TG Norba 24 =

Italian TV news channel

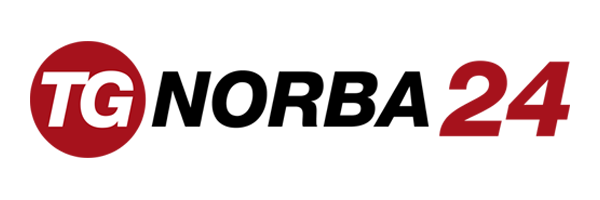
- Logo of the channel
- Country: Italy
- Broadcast area: Italy
- Affiliates: Telenorba; Teledue; Radionorba TV

Programming
- Language: Italian
- Picture format: 16:9 576i (SDTV); 1080i (HDTV upscaled)

Ownership
- Key people: Vicenzo Magistà (director)

History
- Launched: 25 October 2010

Links
- Website: Norbaonline.it

Availability

Terrestrial
- Free to air (Apulia, Basilicata, Molise): Channel 180

Streaming media
- Norba Online: TG Norba 24)

TG Norba 24 is an Italian non-stop news channel owned by Gruppo Norba.

== Overview ==
TG Norba 24 was launched on 25 of October 2010 and it can be watched in different types of broadcasting:

- free-to-air on the digital terrestrial TV in the zones covered by mux including this channel, LCN 180;
- live streaming on the official website;
- satellite digital TV on channel 510 of Sky Italia.

Like other all-news channels, TG Norba 24 features a mix of national and international news, but the particular focus is on southern Italian stories, especially the regions reached by Telenorba's signal and where there are the main offices.

The channel broadcasts live from 5 am to midnight, with a newscast updated every 15 minutes in 16:9 format. Since the 4 may of 2011, the channel has been transmitted in upscaled HD resolution only in Apulia.

The chairman is Vincenzo Magistà.

There are about 150 employees.

It was awarded at the Hot Bird TV Awards 2011 as best new channel.

== Coverage ==
In Puglia, Basilicata and Molise, the channel broadcasts on mux Telenorba 1 in SD.

The channel can be watched in different regions thank to local mux:

- Piedmont (originally on the Videogruppo Piemonte mux, now it's not available)
- Lombardia (mux Telelombardia)
- Veneto, Trentino-Alto Adige and Friuli-Venezia Giulia (mux Antenna Tre Nordest)
- Emilia-Romagna (mux Telesanterno)
- Tuscany, Umbria (mux RTV 38)
- Lazio (mux Telepace)
- Campania (mux Napoli Canale 21)
- Calabria (mux Video Calabria)
- Sicily (mux Teletna)
- Sardinia (mux Videolina)

It's included in the Sky News offer on LCN 510.

== Programmes ==
- Buon Pomeriggio
- TG Norba 24 Mattina
- TG Norba 24 Flash
- TG Norba 24 Pomeriggio
- TG Norba 24 Sera
- TG Norba 24 Lis
- TG Norba 24 Prima
- TG Norba 24 Sport
- TG Norba 24 Rassegna Stampa
- Meteo Telenorba
- Il Meteo
- Doctor TG24
- Il Fatto di Enzo Magistà
- Il Tempo della fede
- Pillole - I Colori della Nostra Terra
- Il Graffio
- Buongiorno
- Astrabilia
