= Cultuur 7 =

- Country: Belgium
- Broadcast area: Flanders and Brussels

Programming
- Language(s): Dutch

Ownership
- Owner: Stingray Digital (from October 2015 until closure)

History
- Launched: 1 October 2006
- Closed: 1 December 2015
- Replaced by: Brava Dutch taking the channel slot
- Former names: EXQI Culture (until October 2013)

Links
- Website: cultuur7.be (defunct)

Cultuur 7 (formerly EXQI Culture) was a Belgian Dutch language speciality television channel broadcast in Flanders and Brussels. The channel broadcast filmed classical music performances, operas, and other cultural programmes in four-hour blocks, especially featuring Flemish productions.

The channel was originally launched on 1 October 2006 by EXQI as EXQI Culture. In October 2013, it was renamed as Cultuur 7.

In October 2015, Stingray Digital in Canada acquired Cultuur 7. On 1 December 2015, Cultuur 7 was closed down, and was replaced by the Dutch version of Brava (Stingray acquired the broadcaster in the Netherlands earlier in July 2015); Cultuur 7's programmes were integrated into the new Brava's schedule.
