= PalmarèsADISQ par Stingray =

- PalmarèsADISQ par Stingray logo
- Country: Canada
- Broadcast area: National
- Headquarters: Montreal, Quebec

Ownership
- Owner: Stingray Group
- Sister channels: Stingray Hits!

History
- Launched: June 6, 2018

Links
- Website: www.stingray.com/fr/consommateur/marque/stingray-palmaresadisq

PalmarèsADISQ par Stingray is a Canadian French language specialty television channel owned by Stingray Group. The channel is a partnership between Stingray and Palmarès ADISQ, a website run by the Association québécoise de l'industrie du disque, du spectacle et de la video (ASDISQ)—a non-profit organization representing independent Quebecois musicians.

The channel primarily broadcasts music videos for French-language songs from Canadian and international musicians, as well as English-language music videos from Quebecois musicians. The channel broadcasts a variety of music genres including pop, rock, hip-hop, and indie from both past and present decades.

== History ==
On June 15, 2018, a week after the channel launch, Stingray and ADISQ jointly announced the launch of PalmarèsADISQ par Stingray. Upon its launch, the channel was added to Vidéotron, however, during its announcement, agreements have been made to add the channel to Bell Fibe TV, Telus, Cogeco, Rogers Cable, Eastlink, and Shaw Direct systems at a later date.
