= Red Media =

Red Media (Russian: Ред Медиа) is a Russian television holding, producer of thematic TV channels and programs for satellite and cable television broadcasting.

== TV channels ==
Channels created and managed by Red Media:

- 365 Days TV is a Russian historical TV channel. It started broadcasting January 17 2006. Previously, it was called Pervyj Rossiyskyi, Istoricheskiy kanal 365 Days TV.
- Europa Plus TV is a Russian music TV channel. It started broadcasting January 14 2011. Created and managed together with European Media Group.
- Point RF is the first Russian TV channel in high definition format. Broadcasting began March 1 2025. It was previously called "HD Life".
- MMA-TV is a mixed martial arts sports channel. It started broadcasting on February 1, 2018.
- Zhara TV is a TV channel about music and show business. It started broadcasting November 1 2011 instead of "TV Boulevard", until April 3, 2017 it was called "STV".
- Auto Plus is a television channel about cars, motor sports and active recreation. It started broadcasting on September 1, 2006.
- KVN TV is a TV channel KVN. Broadcasting began 1 June 2016. Created and managed jointly with TTO "Alexander Maslyakov and KVN.
- Kukhnya is a TV channel dedicated to cooking. It started broadcasting September 15 2007.
- Muzyka Live is the first Russian TV channel devoted to author's and bard songs. It started broadcasting on July 15, 2006.
- Superheroes (television channel) is a television channel for children of preschool and school age. It started broadcasting on October 4, 2016. Earlier it was called "Malysh" and then "Malysh TV".
- Russkaya noch is erotic TV channel. It started broadcasting 15 July 2006.
- Kinopremyera is a TV channel of premieres and novelties of world cinematography. Earlier it was called "Premier".
- Kinohit is a channel of world hits of different years.
- Kinosemya is a TV channel for the whole family. Previously, it was called "HD Cinema".
- Cinema series is a TV channel of dynamic and spectacular series. Previously, it was called "Mnogo TV".
- Men's cinema is a TV channel of dynamic and spectacular cinema.
- Kinosvydanie is a TV channel about the relationship between a man and a woman. It used to be called "Kinoclub".
- Rodnoe kino is a TV channel of cult Soviet, Russian and post-Soviet films. It used to be called "Our Cinema".
- Nashe novoe kino is a TV channel of modern Russian cinema.
- Indiskoe kino is the first Russian channel of Indian films and television programs about India. It started broadcasting on July 1, 2006. Earlier it was called "India TV".
- Kinokomediya is a TV channel of domestic and foreign comedies. Broadcasting began 1 July 2006. Earlier it was called "Comedy TV".
- Kinomyx is a TV channel that broadcasts films of various genres: from thrillers and action films to comedies and romantic films.
- Kinouzhas is a TV channel of horror films.It started broadcasting 1 November 2019.

Channels transferred to other companies

- Boets is the first Russian TV channel dedicated to martial arts. It started broadcasting 16 August 2006. 25 December 2015 moved to National Sports Channel.

Closed channels

- TV Boulevard is a TV channel about the life of stars and the show business industry. It started broadcasting on September 15, 2007. On November 1, 2011, it was replaced by "STV".
- Interesnoe TV is an entertaining and informative TV channel for those who are interested in life. It started broadcasting on September 15, 2007. On September 1, 2015, it was replaced by "Men's Cinema".
- Tvoy dom is a TV channel about construction, design and repair. Broadcast from June 1, 2016 to January 1, 2020.
- M-1 Global is a mixed martial arts sports channel. It started broadcasting on February 1, 2018. Since 2021, it has been replaced by "MMA-TV".
- HDL — March 21 to February 28, 2025.

Partner channels (translation and delivery of the television signal to the point of ascent to the Eutelsat W4 satellite)

- Comedy TV (June 16, 2009 - September 1, 2014)
- Fashion TV
- Gulli Girl (since April 1, 2009)
- Playboy TV
- Sony Channel
- Sony Sci-Fi
- Syfy Universal (2008-2013)
- TiJi (since April 1, 2009)
- Universal Channel (2008—2015)
- Live!
- Kto est kto?
- Nostalgia
- Channels of the subholding "Match TV" (since 2016)

== Broadcasting ==
The holding's TV channels are broadcast on the NTV Plus satellite platform, as well as on cable television networks in Russia, the CIS and Baltic countries, in the USA and Canada (more than 800 operators in total).
