= 365 Days TV =

- Country: Russia
- Broadcast area: Russia
- Headquarters: Moscow, Russia

Programming
- Language: Russian

Ownership
- Owner: Red Media

History
- Founded: 2006
- Founder: Red Media

Links
- Website: www.365days.ru

365 Days TV (Russian: 365 дней ТВ) is a Russian historian channel. It is owned by the Red Media. The channel is described as "the first Russian history television channel". It has won the Hot Bird TV Awards prize thrice (2006 – The Best Dynamically Developing Channel, 2008 – Culture and Education, 2010 – The Best Documentary TV Channel). The channel is included into basic package of the NTV Plus.

== See also ==
- Viasat History
- History
