= Beta Film =

German film company

Beta Film GmbH
- Founded: 1959
- Founder: Leo Kirch
- Headquarters: Munich, Germany
- Owner: Jan Mojto

Beta Film GmbH is a German company dedicated to licensing, distribution and production of film and television content.

Beta Film GmbH & Co. was founded in 1959 in Munich by Leo Kirch. In 2004, two years after the collapse of Kirch's media holdings, the company was acquired by Jan Mojto. In addition to Germany, the company operates in Austria, Italy, Croatia, Spain, and Sweden through labels.

In December 2024, Beta signed a deal with SBS Australia to distribute nearly 200 hours of entertainment, airing in 2025 on SBS Australia's streaming platform SBS on Demand.
