= Jan Mojto =

International film producer (born 1948)

- Born: May 13, 1948 (age 78); Nitra, Slovakia
- Occupations: producer and co-producer
- Years active: 1987–present

Jan Mojto (born 13 May 1948 in Nitra, Czechoslovakia) is a film producer and rights trader. His group of companies is based in Oberhaching near Munich.

== Life and career ==
Jan Mojto is an international film producer and rights trader. The core of his group of companies is Beta Film, which emerged from KirchMedia and has a catalogue of more than 30,000 hours of programming or 4,000 titles and also continues to act as a producer/co-producer of national and international film and television productions. This makes it one of the largest European distribution companies for television, home video and new media. The portfolio of Beta Cinema and the now merged Kineos includes numerous Academy Award-nominated and award-winning films. In the classical music sector, Unitel, which also originates from KirchMedia, is the leading international producer of audiovisual music recordings with a catalogue of around 2,500 productions such as Carnegie Hall in New York. The television channel Classica is represented on several dozen pay platforms worldwide. The group also includes more than 40 production companies and distribution labels as well as speciality channels throughout Europe.

Until the end of 2001, Mojto was responsible for the programme division at KirchMedia. Born in Slovakia, he was a member of the supervisory boards of Mediaset/Italy, Telepiù/Italy, Gestevisión Telecinco/Spain, ProSiebenSat.1 Media AG and KirchPayTV as well as President of ACT - Association of Commercial Television in Europe from 1994 to 2002. Before joining Kirch, he worked as a journalist specialising in film, theatre and literature. Mojto, who speaks eight languages, studied literature and history in Bratislava and Munich, as well as at the Institut Européen d'Administration des Affaires in Fontainebleau (MBA).

Mojto received the Charles Medal for European Media (2003), the Bavarian Television Award (for Napoleon, 2003), the Austrian Romy Television Award (for Crown Prince Rudolf, 2006), the Bavarian Order of Merit (2007), the German Film Award and the Bavarian Film Award (both for John Rabe, 2009), the Officier de l'Ordre National des Arts et des Lettres and the European Trebbia Award for the Promotion of Art and Culture (both 2011). The Unitel productions Waldbühnenkonzert in Berlin, Le nozze di Figaro (Salzburg) and Ring des Nibelungen (Valencia) were honoured with the prestigious Echo Klassik award in 2007, 2008 and 2010. In 2012, he received the insignia of a Chevalier dans l'Ordre de la Légion d'Honneur and the Gold Medal of the City of Cannes, and most recently in 2013 the MipTV Medaille d'Honneur. Mojto teaches as a lecturer at the Film Academy Baden-Württemberg in Ludwigsburg and is involved in the university council of the HFF Munich. After 2013, Mojto continued his successful career as a film producer and rights trader. He continued to work as a lecturer at the Film Academy Baden-Württemberg in Ludwigsburg. Until 2015, he was a member of the University Council of the University of Television and Film Munich (HFF) and played a key role in the introduction of a full-time presidency. In 2023, Mojto entered into a partnership with producer Nico Hofmann to jointly produce German and European series and films for the international market. This collaboration builds on decades of successful cooperation, which has resulted in productions such as The Tunnel, Dresden and Our Mothers, Our Fathers.

As a producer, Mojto has been involved in some of the most acclaimed German and international cinema and TV productions, including Rise of the Raven, Bookish, Maxima (7th Canneseries, 2024), Homejacking (Series Mania), Operation Sabre (7th Canneseries 2024, winner of the Special Interpretation Award), ‘Soviet Jeans’ (Berlinale and Series Mania), 30 Days of Lust (Series Mania and Seriencamp Cologne 2024, winner Audience Choice Award), Prisma (International Drama Award Summit London, 2023; Nastri d'Argento; 2023; Locarno International Film Festival), Hotel Portofino (Seoul Drama Awards, 2022), Persona (International Emmy Awards, 2019, winner in the Performance by an Actor category), "Hudson & Rex" (Canadian Screen Award) and the LEGACY franchises such as “Gomorrah” and “Babylon Berlin” (winner of the Bambi for Best Series of the Year 2018 and European Film Award 2019 for Best Fictional Series).

In the field of classical music, Mojto was responsible for the award-winning Salzburg Festival cycle Mozart22, the audiovisual recording of Beethoven9 with the Vienna Philharmonic Orchestra and Christian Thielemann and Der Ring des Nibelungen from Valencia with Zubin Mehta in the production by La Fura dels Baus. Unitel's current projects include Tutto Verdi, the world's only audiovisual recording of all Verdi operas to mark the 200th anniversary of the master's birth, as well as the current productions of the Salzburg Festival. Unitel is the exclusive partner for audiovisual productions of the Vienna Philharmonic Orchestra and Christian Thielemann, among others.

Since December 2015, the majority shareholders of Beta Film have been his two daughters Catharina and Maria Carolina Mojto (each via an intermediate company) with a majority of 85 percent.

== Beta Film ==
Beta Film acts as an interface between producers, broadcasters and streaming platforms worldwide. The company covers several business areas:

- International distribution: Beta Film distributes a wide range of film and series formats, including feature films, drama series, documentaries, children's programmes and entertainment shows. The works are licensed to TV channels, streaming services and other platforms in over 180 countries.
- Financing: Beta Film supports producers in financing their projects. The company provides capital, helps to structure co-productions and accesses funding to realise ambitious film and series projects.
- Production: In addition to distribution, Beta Film is actively involved in the development and production of content. This is often done in co-operation with international production companies, directors and screenwriters.
- Co-productions: Beta Film is known for promoting European and international co-productions. The company acts as a partner in bringing cultural diversity and high-quality content to the screen.

== Filmography ==
- 1993–2002: Die Bibel
- 1993–2014: Kommissar Rex
- 1993: Radetzkymarsch
- 1993–1999: Allein gegen die Mafia
- 1998: Der Graf von Monte Christo
- 2000: Les Misérables
- 2000: Der Tunnel
- 2002: Napoleon
- 2003: Stauffenberg
- 2004: Der Untergang
- 2005: La Traviata / Salzburger Festspiele
- 2006: Kronprinz Rudolfs letzte Liebe
- 2006: Mozart 22 / Salzburger Festspiele
- 2006: Die Flucht
- 2006: Das Leben der Anderen
- 2006: Die Sturmflut
- 2006: Dresden – das Inferno
- 2006: Krieg und Frieden
- 2007: Waldbühnenkonzert Berlin / Netrebko / Domingo / Villazon
- 2008: Eine einzige Tablette
- 2008: Karajan – Oder die Schönheit wie ich sie sehe
- 2008: La Bohème
- 2008: John Rabe
- 2008–2010: Beethoven 9 / Wiener Philharmoniker / Christian Thielemann
- 2009: Ring des Nibelungen / Valencia / La Fura dels Baus
- 2010: Rosenkavalier / Baden-Baden
- 2010: Laconia
- 2010: Hindenburg
- 2010: Papst Pius XII
- 2011: Anna Bolena / Wiener Staatsoper
- 2011–2014: Borgia, Staffel 1–3
- 2012: Der Turm
- 2012: Tutto Verdi
- 2012: War Requiem
- 2013: Unsere Mütter, unsere Väter
- 2013: Der Medicus
- 2013: Burning Bush – Die Helden von Prag (Hořící keř)
- 2014: Das Attentat – Sarajevo 1914
- 2014: Gomorrah – The Series
- 2017: Maximilian – Das Spiel von Macht und Liebe
- 2018: Werk ohne Autor

== Awards and honours ==
- 2003: Charlemagne Medal for European Media
- 2003: Bavarian Television Award (Napoleon)
- 2006: Austrian Television Award Romy, Best Producer (Crown Prince Rudolf)
- 2007: Bavarian Order of Merit
- 2007: Echo Klassik for Unitel production Waldbühnenkonzert Berlin
- 2008: Echo Klassik for Unitel production Le nozze di Figaro (Salzburg)
- 2008: Appointment as honorary citizen of Nitra/Slovakia
- 2009: German Film Award and Bavarian Film Award (John Rabe)
- 2009: Roma Fiction Fest "Lifetime Achievement Award"
- 2010: Echo Klassik for Unitel production Ring des Nibelungen (Valencia)
- 2011: Officier de l'Ordre National des Arts et des Lettres
- 2011: European Trebbia Prize for the promotion of art and culture
- 2012: Awarded the insignia of Chevalier dans l'Ordre de la Légion d'Honneur
- 2012: Gold Medal of the City of Cannes
- 2013: MipTV Medaille d'Honneur
- 2018: Bavarian Film Award (together with Max Wiedemann and Quirin Berg) for Werk ohne Autor
- 2019: Romy Awards 2019 – Academy Award Platinum Romy for Lifetime Achievement
