= Max Trax =

Canadian TV audio service

- Max Trax logo
- Country: Canada
- Broadcast area: National
- Headquarters: Toronto, Ontario

Ownership
- Owner: Stingray Digital

History
- Launched: Summer 1997 (29 years ago)
- Closed: October 1, 2009 (16 years ago)
- Former names: Digital Music Express (1997–1999); DMX (1999–2002)

Max Trax was a Canadian pay television audio service that broadcast continuous streaming music on multiple channel feeds. The service was owned by Stingray Digital.

Originally known as Digital Music Express in 1997, the channel later closed in 2009 as Max Trax once assets related to the service were sold to Stingray Digital, owners of a similar service, then known as Galaxie and eventually as Stingray Music.

== Programming ==
At the time of its closing, Max Trax offered 22 commercial-free music based audio channels, each devoted to a particular musical genre or theme, distributed through digital television platforms. Each channel consisted of a continuous stream of music or audio, using no live, on-air disc jockeys. The majority of channels broadcast mainly English-language music, however, French and instrumental channels were also available.

=== Channels ===
- Blues Street
- Flashback 70's
- Franco Energie
- Franco Relax
- Greatest Hits
- Hit List
- Hot Country
- Jammin
- Jazz Café
- Treehouse
- Le Top Détente
- Masterworks
- Max Trax Party
- Memories
- Musique Bout'Choux
- Rave
- Rock
- Rock Alternative
- Swingin' Standards
- The Beat
- The Light
- The Spa

== History ==
In December 1995, DMX Canada (1995) Ltd., a joint venture between Shaw Cablesystems (80%) and International Cablecasting Technologies Inc. (ICT) (20%), a US-based company associated with the similar US service DMX, was granted a broadcasting licence from the Canadian Radio-television and Telecommunications Commission (CRTC). At the time of this decision, it was proposed that the service would compose of a mixture of Canadian-produced channels, along with channels directly from the US.

Logo as Digital Music Express

The service launched in the summer of 1997 as Digital Music Express, often referred to as simply DMX, with 30 channels.

In early 1999, Digital Music Express launched a new logo, officially referring itself as DMX in all consumer media.

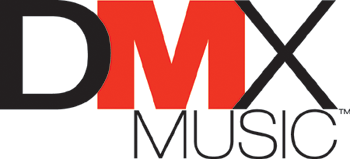
Logo as DMX

In September 1999, Shaw's broadcasting assets were spun-off into a separately traded company to comply with CRTC regulations, creating Corus Entertainment, DMX's new owners.

In February 2002, Corus announced that it would be purchasing all remaining shares of the DMX television service from DMX MUSIC, Inc. (formerly ICT), while also selling all remaining shares of the DMX business unit, a provider of licensed music for commercial use in stores, restaurants, and other commercial setting, to DMX MUSIC, Inc. The service would be rebranded Max Trax just 3 months later on May 1, 2002.

Because of service duplication, in 2002, Galaxie (a similar television service) and Max Trax agreed to provide a joint 40-channel audio distribution service to satellite and digital cable television providers called Galaxie Max Trax. The package consisted of 20 Max Trax and 20 Galaxie channels. The package was discontinued upon merger with Galaxie in late 2009.

On February 13, 2009, Corus Entertainment announced it had entered into an agreement to sell certain assets associated with Max Trax to Stingray Digital, including hardware, software, websites, domain names, among other assets including trademarks that includes the Max Trax name. Previous to the sale to Stingray, in December 2008, Stingray received a category 2 digital licence to operate a national pay-TV audio service, similar to Max Trax, from the CRTC. The agreement was structured so that Corus would discontinue the Max Trax service, keeping the service on the air until Stingray launched its own service under its own licence using the Max Trax brand, resulting in a seamless transition and no interruption in services. The Stingray service never launched; instead the Galaxie licence was continued to be used.

On October 1, 2009 the Max Trax brand was discontinued by owners Stingray Digital, who merged it with Galaxie under one brand, which eventually became Stingray Music. Stingray Digital, who had been operating as the exclusive sales and development agent for Galaxie since late 2007 on behalf of its owners, the CBC, officially took over as managing partner in the service upon completion of merger. Stingray would later purchase Galaxie from the CBC in May 2011.

The original licence for Max Trax that was owned by Corus, was revoked by the CRTC on September 23, 2011.
