= Sara Brajovic =

French style blogger, model, musician and actress

- Born: Paris, France
- Education: King's College London, École Normale de Musique
- Occupations: Musician, writer, model
- Partner: Stéphane Ratel

Sara Brajovic is a French musician, model and writer of Serbian descent and is currently living in London.

== Career ==
Brajovic was photographed by Patrick Demarchelier for American Vogue, with Anna Wintour calling her an influential trendsetter. She also modelled for and contributed articles to American Vogue, as well as appearing on its best dressed lists. https://www.vogue.co.uk/gallery/12-9

In addition to writing, Brajovic has acted in several European productions, like the films Friends Like Us, Amici Come Noi, Here Lies, Medusa's Ankles and Vaniglia e cioccolato. She was also in a Martini TV commercial with Jude Law and was invited by RTS1 Serbian National TV Radio Television of Serbia several times to be a guest in their popular morning show where she talks about the importance of female education. In terms of modelling work, she signed with IMG Models worldwide and became the face of the brand Chloé and has posed for Tod's, Aquazzura, Chaumet, Fendi, Lancome, Renault, Motorola, Pantene and Tag Heuer. After a worldwide casting search for a talent to play Eva Kant from the Italian comic book Diabolik Sara was chosen. Sara was the testimonial and face of Renault cars for TV commercials, print media and TV shows. She was a special guest of Giorgio Armani at his Paris Fashion Week show in 2018. She has frequently been featured in printed editions of British, American, Serbian, Italian, French, Spanish and Russian magazines for her style advice. She has been a muse for British fashion designers Roland Mouret and Matthew Williamson. She was photographed for the French Chic and Beauty Net- A -Porter issue., did an interview for Italian Vogue about her music and writing and an interview for L'Officiel Italia in partnership with Fendi. She was photographed for Spanish HOLA magazine as one of the International Society Beauties.

== Music ==
As a classical pianist, she performed at several concerts and released a classical music album Story of O under the recording name Sara O. in 2022. She wrote the music for her album and performed it as well. She gave a concert in Rome at Gardens of Sallust in 2014 during a concert exhibition "When we dream we are all creators" with 30 internationally renowned artists. She is signed with Platoon Artists.

== Background ==
Born and raised in Paris, Brajovic attended boarding school in Switzerland. She was discovered at the age of 11 years old when she was spotted and photographed by Peter Lindbergh while on family vacation in the south of France. She then studied music at the École Normale de Musique de Paris. She graduated with a degree in history from London's King's College landing a job at Sotheby's London Impressionist department. After a move to New York City, she studied acting at the Lee Strasberg studio.

Brajovic's parents both lived in France and Italy, working in the entertainment industry. She remembers meeting Alain Delon and Jean-Paul Belmondo when she was younger. Her mother worked as a model for Yves Saint Laurent, produced with Carlo Ponti the film Mama Lucia featuring Sophia Loren and later founded a publishing company. Sara was engaged to French CEO and Motorsports founder Stéphane Ratel.
