= Pashto TV =

Afghan Pashto-language family television channel

Pashto TV پښتو تلويزيون
- Country: Afghanistan
- Broadcast area: Afghanistan, Pakistan (mainly Khyber Pakhtunkhwa province of Pakistan, Quetta), Iran, India, UAE, Saudi Arabia, Rest of the world ^{(through internet)}
- Headquarters: Kabul, Afghanistan

Programming
- Language: Pashto

Ownership
- Owner: N. R. Liwal

History
- Launched: 2010

Links
- Website: www.pashtotv.tv

Availability

Streaming media
- Ustream: Pashto TV

Pashto TV is a Pashto-language family television channel based in Afghanistan and launched in 2010. It is owned by Liwal limited. The programs are based on the principles of the Pashtun people's code of life. The main office of Pashto TV is located in Kabul, Afghanistan.

The channel is part of the Afghan Choice bouquet of channels. The channel is available on satellite to the Pashtun population of Asia and the Middle East. It is also freely available through internet on Ustream.

== Funding and support ==
Noor Rahman Liwal, an Afghan entrepreneur and philanthropist, and his family, are the investors in Pashto TV. Other sources of income include sale of broadcast content, Liwal Distance School Subscription, advertising, broadcasting services.

== Shows ==
The channel broadcasts educational and mostly talk shows. The following is a list of notable shows:

Name	Type
De Aka Milma	Comedy
De Aonai Hindara	News
Den aow Dunia	Religious
Liwal Distance School	Educational
Nananai Shanana	Political
Pashto Adabi Dera	Poetry/Shairi
Pighamoona	Messages from Audience
Yaw chak chak	Comedy

== Awards ==
2011 - Pashto TV and LDS (Liwal Distance School) were both nominated and won the manthan award in the category of E-EDUCATION & LEARNING in the year 2011.

2012 Special Mention Award, EUTELSAT TV AWARD 2012 in category Culture/Documentaries. In 2012 Pashto TV received special mention awarded in category Culture/Documentaries, there were more than 120 Participating Channels and about 20 in Culture/Documentaries, among the participants the Farsi1 sister channel of Lamar and Tolo TV.

N.R.Liwal, President Pashto TV profiled as Leader in Digital Media 2012 by Digital TV Europe, The Euro50 Special Issue

A special issue of Digital TV Europe that reflects and honors the achievements of individuals working across the pay-TV and broadband industries. The Euro50, an annual publication in its eleventh year, celebrates those who have demonstrated outstanding leadership and vision in their fields and made a significant contribution to the strength of their organization or the industry itself.

It has become a publication that profiles notable individuals from broadband and pay-TV industries.
