= Stingray Music (Europe) =

- Country: Germany; Netherlands; United Kingdom
- Broadcast area: Europe; Middle East
- Headquarters: Amsterdam, Netherlands; Kassel, Germany; London, United Kingdom

Ownership
- Owner: Stingray Group

History
- Launched: 1993; 32 years ago
- Former names: Music Choice (1993–2014)

Links
- Website: music.stingray.com

Stingray Music (formerly Music Choice) is a multilingual digital music pay radio service based in Germany, the Netherlands and the United Kingdom, owned by the Stingray Group, and is currently available in 17 countries across Europe and the Middle East. Stingray Music consists of several multilingual commercial-free audio-only linear radio channels devoted to a particular genre or related-grouping of music. Stingray Music also operates an ad-supported video-on-demand service that offers music videos and also broadcasts live on the Internet and mobile app.

== History ==
The service launched as Music Choice in 1993 by shareholders including Sony and Time Warner. In 2007 Music Choice acquired its main competitor, Xtra Music (DMX).

By the end of June 2010 Sky TV removed Music Choice from its subscriptions after 15 years of service. It had also been available for a while in the late 1990s on some UK analogue cable services.

Canadian company Stingray Group purchased Music Choice in 2011.

After three years Music Choice returned in the United Kingdom, and launched on the TalkTalk platform via an application, or 'Player', on YouView by the end of April 2013.

On 1 April 2015, Stingray changed the name of Music Choice to Stingray Music.

On 1 April 2019, Stingray Music closed on Ziggo in the Netherlands. It has been replaced by Xite Music.

== Linear channels ==
=== Decades ===
- 60s
- 70s
- 80s
- 90s
- 00s
- Revival 60s-70s
- Rewind 80s-90s
- Rock N' Roll

=== Pop ===
- All Day Party
- Drive
- Freedom
- Kids
- Silk (Love Songs)
- Total Hits Belgium
- Total Hits France
- Total Hits Germany
- Total Hits Italy
- Total Hits Netherlands
- Total Hits Nordic
- Total Hits Spain
- Total Hits Sweden
- Total Hits UK

=== International ===
- Arabic
- Bollywood Hits
- Chansons
- Classical India
- Hindi Gold
- Hollandse Hits
- Hollandse Hits Gold
- Karneval Germany
- Nederpop
- Nederpop Gold
- Punjabi
- Schlager
- Schlager Sweden
- Sounds of South India
- South Africa Gospel
- South Africa Modern
- South Africa Traditional
- Swiss Hits
- Türk Müzigi
- Volsmusik
- World Carnival

=== Dance ===
- Bass, Breaks & Beats
- Chillout
- Classic R'n'B & Soul
- Disco Classics
- Dance Floor Fillers
- Groove (Disco & Funk)
- Hip Hop

=== Rock ===
- Classic Rock
- Hard Rock
- Harder Than Hell
- Indie Classics
- Rock Anthems
- Rock of Ages

=== Country ===
- Country

=== Urban ===
- Urban

=== Classical ===
- Classical Calm
- Classical Greats
- Classical Orchestral

=== Jazz ===
- Cool Jazz
- Jazz Classics

=== Others ===
- Alternative
- Alternative Classics
- Blues
- Kinderliedjes 6-11 (Netherlands)
- (Cocktail) Lounge
- New Age
- Peuter & Kleuterliedjes (Netherlands)
- Reggae
- South African Traditional
- South African Modern
- Carnival

== See also ==
- MTV
