= Stingray Naturescape =

- Stingray Naturescape logo
- Country: Canada
- Broadcast area: National
- Headquarters: Montreal, Quebec

Ownership
- Owner: Stingray Group

History
- Launched: September 2014
- Former names: Stingray Ambiance (2014-2020)

Links
- Website: Stingray Naturescape

Stingray Naturescape is a Canadian-based specialty television channel owned by Stingray Group. The channel primarily broadcasts a rotation of various nature scenery videos with accompanying audio from the nature scene pictured with sometimes non-verbal music added to create a "soothing" atmosphere. During the Christmas and holiday season, the channel will broadcast videos of a crackling fireplace during portions of the day, primarily evening, night, and early morning hours. The channel will also broadcast the fireplace, without music, every day of the year from 6:00pm–11:00pm.

The channel broadcasts in both high definition and 4K resolution (ultra-high-definition television).

== History ==
On February 20, 2013, Stingray Digital was granted approval from the Canadian Radio-television and Telecommunications Commission (CRTC) to launch The Seasonal Channel, described as "a national, niche, no spoken word specialty Category B service featuring still pictures and moving video of nature scenes with appropriate music that would change based upon the season to create a soothing video environment."

The channel later launched in September 2014 as Stingray Ambiance on Vidéotron in high-definition only.

In September 2015, the channel launched a second 4K UHD feed under the Stingray Ambiance 4K moniker initially on Vidéotron, marking the first 4K television channel in the Stingray portfolio.

Since the channel's original launch in Canada, it has since been launched in multiple countries spanning several continents including Germany, Mexico, Portugal, and Indonesia, among others.

In early 2020, while maintaining the same programming concept, the channel was renamed Stingray Naturescape.
