= Stingray Group =

Canadian media and entertainment company

Stingray Group Inc.
- Type: Public
- Traded as: TSX: RAY
- Industry: Media
- Founded: 2007; 19 years ago
- Founder: Eric Boyko
- Headquarters: 730, rue Wellington; Montreal, Quebec; H3C 1T4
- Area served: Worldwide
- Key people: Eric Boyko (president, CEO & founder)
- Revenue: $ 386.9 million (2025)
- Net income: $ 35.0 million (2025)
- Owner: Boyko Investments Corporation
- Number of employees: 1,000+ (2025)
- Website: stingray.com

Stingray Group Inc. (formerly Stingray Digital and Stingray Digital Group) is a Canadian music, media and technology company based in Montreal, Quebec, with offices in Toronto, Ontario, as well as in the United States, Mexico, the United Kingdom, the Netherlands, Germany and Australia. The company was established in 2007 by Eric Boyko and is owned by Boyko Investments Corporation.

The company is primarily involved in digital audio services targeting consumer and business-to-business markets, including internet radio, over-the-top and music television channels, DTV radio, and business audio and advertising services. Through its Stingray Radio division (the former Newcap Broadcasting), it is the largest owner of terrestrial radio stations in Canada.

== History ==
Stingray was founded in May 2007 by Eric Boyko and Alexandre Taillefer, in partnership with Telesystem, following the purchase of karaoke company Soundchoice for $6 million. This gave them a catalogue of karaoke songs and a karaoke channel, allowing them to create The Karaoke Channel (now known as Stingray Karaoke). Later that year, the company acquired cable TV commercial-free music service Galaxie from the Canadian Broadcasting Corporation for $65 million, renaming it Stingray Music. Taillefer exited the company in 2010. In 2011, Stingray acquired Music Choice Europe.

In May 2015, Stingray raised $140 million in its initial public offering. The sale gave the firm a market value of $296 million. It began trading on the Toronto Stock Exchange on June 3, 2015, under the ticker RAY.A. Novacap sold most of its stake in the company after the IPO.

On May 2, 2018, Stingray announced its intent to acquire Newcap Radio for $506 million, marking the company's expansion into terrestrial radio broadcasting in Canada. The sale was completed on October 26, 2018, with the family of company founder Harold R. Steele becoming Stingray's largest third-party shareholder. In December 2018, the company changed its name to Stingray Group.

Although its services face competition from consumer-targeted streaming offerings such as Apple Music and Spotify, the company has continued to emphasize its use of manually-curated playlists for its services (as opposed to algorithmic recommendations), and its focus on international expansion into territories where pay television is experiencing growth, and promoting complementary services such as mobile apps.

== Properties ==
=== Business services ===
- Stingray Business, a provider of in-store music licensed for commercial use, audio-visual systems and TV screens
- Chatter Research
- Stingray Advertising

=== Karaoke services ===
- Stingray Karaoke, a licensed karaoke supplier and an interactive television and Internet service
- Yokee Karaoke
- Kid's Karaoke
- The Voice Karaoke
- Sing Karaoke by Stingray

=== Mobile apps ===
- Stingray Karaoke
- Kid's Karaoke
- Singing Machine
- Stingray Music
- Qello Concerts by Stingray
- Stingray Classica
- Yokee karaoke
- Yokee Guitar
- Yokee Piano
- Piano Academy
- The Piano Keyboard
- Stingray Music for Businesses
- TuneIn

=== TV Channels – concerts and shows ===
- Stingray iConcerts, an on-demand service broadcasting live music performances
- Stingray Classica
- Stingray Djazz
- Qello Concerts by Stingray

=== TV Channels – 4K UHD ===
- Stingray Naturescape (formerly Stingray Ambiance), a television channel showing relaxing scenery accompanied by soothing music
- Stingray Now 4K
- Stingray Festival 4K

=== TV Channels – music video ===
- Stingray Country
- Stingray Loud
- Stingray Juicebox
- Stingray Retro
- Stingray Vibe
- Stingray Pop (formerly Stingray Hits!)
- Stingray Now 4K
- Stingray CMusic
- PalmarèsADISQ par Stingray
- Stingray Latin Hits

=== Original content ===
- Stingray Pause Play
- Evolution of a Song
- Behind the Vinyl
- Songbook

=== Radio and broadcast stations ===
- Stingray Radio, a group of terrestrial radio and television stations in Canada, formerly operating as Newcap Radio and Newcap Broadcasting.

== Competitors ==
Music Choice, which launched in 1991, is owned by Microsoft, Arris, Sony Corp. of America, EMI Music Publishing, Time Warner, Comcast, Cox Communications and Charter Communications. Music Choice is in 72 million American households. The company filed the lawsuit against Stingray Digital in the U.S. District Court for the Eastern District of Texas in June 2016 over patent infringement. The patents in dispute are U.S. Patent Nos. 8,769,602, 9,357,245, 7,320,025 and 9,351,045 pertaining to the on screen formatting of Stingray Digital's channels. Stingray countersued Music Choice on August 29, 2016, calling it a "smear campaign".

== Acquisitions and partnerships ==
From its founding in 2007 through 2015, Stingray Digital acquired 18 companies, at a total cost of $150 million. Its first purchase was Soundchoice, followed by Galaxie, from the Canadian Broadcasting Corporation. In 2009, Stingray announced it would be acquiring the majority of assets in Max Trax from Corus Entertainment. In August 2010, the company purchased Concert TV, a US video on demand service carrying recorded musical performances. In April 2011, Stingray announced that it was purchasing London-based music streaming company Music Choice International, helping Stingray expand into Europe and Africa. In May 2013, Stingray purchased the Canadian accounts of eMedia Network. In 2014 Stingray acquired Lite TV from the Archibald Media Group, and purchased Mood Media's residential digital music service in Latin America for $16 million. In February 2015, Stingray acquired in-store commercial display company Groupe Viva. In July 2015, Stingray announced it would pay $8 million for Netherlands-based Brava Group, operator of thematic television music channels Brava NL, Brava HD and Djazz.TV, with 35 million subscribers in 50 countries in Europe, the Middle East and the Caribbean, with plans to bring the channels to the US, Canada and Latin America.

In 2009, Stingray signed an agreement with Google to become a content partner by launching TheKARAOKEChannel YouTube channel. In 2015, Stingray invested in AppDirect, which develops online stores for business software applications, and made a deal with Air Canada to be the music provider on its flights. Stingray also has hotel chain partners, to feed Stingray's music into guest rooms.

On June 21, 2016, Stingray announced that it would acquire the MuchMusic spin-off channels MuchVibe, MuchLoud, MuchRetro, and Juicebox from Bell Media. The group of channels were previously owned by CHUM Limited.

In May 2017, Stingray acquired Israel-based Yokee Music LTD, provider of three social music apps regularly ranked in the music category's top 10 in 100 countries: Yokee, Yokee Guitar, and Yokee Piano.

In January 2018, Stingray acquired the assets of New-York based Qello Concerts, the world's leading over-the-top (OTT) streaming service for full-length, on-demand performances, concert films, and music documentaries — reaching users in more than 160 countries.

In June 2018, in partnership with ADISQ and its website PalmarèsADISQ, Stingray launched PalmarèsADISQ par Stingray, a new music channel devoted to Quebecois and French-Canadian music.

In August 2018, Stingray announced that it had made a $120 million takeover bid for its main competitor in the United States, Music Choice. In January 2019, Stingray abandoned the bid, shortly after having reached a deal with Altice USA to replace Music Choice on its cablesystems.

Stingray Brava was closed and merged with Stingray Classica on March 1, 2019.

In January 2022, Stingray acquired InStore Audio Network, rebranding the company as Stingray Advertising the following year.

In November 2025, Stingray announced that it would acquire the San Francisco-based internet radio service TuneIn for US$175 million.

== See also ==
- Music of Canada
- Mass media in Canada
- List of Canadian companies
