= Stingray iConcerts =

- Stingray iConcerts logo
- Country: Canada
- Broadcast area: Worldwide
- Headquarters: Montreal, Quebec

Programming
- Picture format: 1080i HDTV (downscaled to 16:9 576i for the SDTV feed)

Ownership
- Owner: Stingray Group
- Sister channels: Stingray Classica; Stingray Djazz; Stingray Lite TV

History
- Launched: September 2003; 22 years ago
- Former names: Canada: Concert TV (2003–2015); Stingray Concerts (2015–2017); Europe: iConcerts (2006–2017)

Links
- Website: Stingray iConcerts

Availability

Streaming media
- Canal Digitaal Live App: Watch Live

Stingray iConcerts is a Canadian-based video-on-demand television channel broadcasting full-length live musical performances from various genres of music. The channel is owned by the Stingray Group.

== History ==
Stingray Concerts was founded as an independent company by Jeff Shultz and Michael Shimbo in September 2003 as Concert TV. It was originally exclusively available in the United States and focused on broadcasting recordings of live musical performances and documentaries from various musical genres and acts. Under the management of Shultz and Shimbo, the company secured distribution with Comcast, Charter, Cox, DirecTV, and other cable, satellite and IP TV operators as well as partnerships with MTV, and the BBC. The company's early advertising customers included Cingular (AT&T Wireless), Warner Bros. and Paramount.

In January 2009, in an effort to expand its television offerings, Mag Rack Entertainment (later renamed Interactivation) purchased the company for an undisclosed price.

In a move aimed at divesting itself of assets to focus on health-related content, Interactivation announced it was selling Concert TV to Stingray Digital in August 2010. During the announcement, Stingray Digital declared its intentions to expand Concert TV to other areas in the US and into Canada. After the purchase, Concert TV's headquarters were moved from the U.S. to Stingray's head office in Montreal, Quebec, Canada.

Concert TV began launching on various Canadian television service providers' systems throughout 2011. Meanwhile, as Concert TV was reaching agreements for carriage and launching on various Canadian television systems, Stingray was granted approval from the Canadian Radio-television and Telecommunications Commission (CRTC) in September 2011 to launch a 24-hour linear television service called Concert TV, described as "a national, English-language specialty Category B service devoted to current and historical music concerts from a wide variety of music genres and related programming."

In November 2015, Concert TV was re-branded Stingray Concerts as part of a wider initiative to group all Stingray products under the same brand name. The channel was subsequently merged with iConcerts, a channel that Stingray purchased in late 2015, and was renamed Stingray iConcerts on February 23, 2017.
