= Stingray Lite TV =

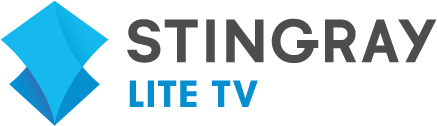
- Country: Netherlands
- Broadcast area: Netherlands; Belgium

Programming
- Picture format: 576i (16:9, SD)

Ownership
- Owner: Stingray Group
- Sister channels: Stingray Classica; Stingray iConcerts; Stingray Djazz

History
- Launched: 17 December 2007; 17 years ago
- Former names: Lite TV (2007-2015)

Links
- Website: www.stingray.com/consumer/brands/stingray-litetv

Availability

Streaming media
- Ziggo GO (Netherlands): ZiggoGO.tv (Europe only)

Stingray Lite TV is a non-stop music television channel that brings mainly (soft) pop music videos from the 80s, 90s and today. 24/7. 2Connect Media BV launched the channel as Lite TV on 17 December 2007. In June 2014 the Stingray Group acquired Lite TV from the Archibald Media Group. On 1 April 2015, the channel has received its current name, before it was called Lite TV. Stingray Lite TV can be received via cable and IPTV in the Netherlands and Belgium.
