= List of radio stations in New Brunswick =

⁷ The following is a list of radio stations in the Canadian province of New Brunswick, as of 2025.

Call sign	Frequency	City of licence	Owner	Format
CBAL-FM-1	101.9 FM	Allardville	Ici Musique	public music (French)
CJSE-FM-2	107.5 FM	Baie-Sainte-Anne	Capacadie	country community radio (French)
CIMS-FM	103.9 FM	Balmoral	La Coopérative Radio Restigouche	community radio (French)
CKLE-FM	92.9 FM	Bathurst	Radio de la Baie	adult contemporary (French)
CBAA-FM	97.9 FM	Bathurst	CBC Radio One	public news/talk
CBAL-FM-1	101.9 FM	Bathurst	Ici Musique	public music (French)
CJUJ-FM	103.3 FM	Bathurst	Bathurst Radio Inc.	community radio
CKBC-FM	104.9 FM	Bathurst	Maritime Broadcasting System	classic hits
CBAF-FM-2	105.7 FM	Bathurst	Ici Radio-Canada Première	public news/talk (French)
CBZB-FM	90.9 FM	Boiestown	CBC Radio One	public news/talk
CBAF-FM-21	91.7 FM	Bon Accord	Ici Radio-Canada Première	public news/talk (French)
CBZC-FM	103.3 FM	Bon Accord	CBC Radio One	public news/talk
CITA-FM-4	107.7 FM	Bouctouche	International Harvesters for Christ Evangelistic Association Inc.	Christian radio
CBAL-FM-3	88.9 FM	Campbellton	Ici Musique	public music (French)
CBAE-FM	90.5 FM	Campbellton	CBC Radio One	public news/talk
CBAF-FM-3	91.5 FM	Campbellton	Ici Radio-Canada Première	public news/talk (French)
CKNB-FM	100.7 FM	Campbellton	Maritime Broadcasting System	adult contemporary
CBAF-FM-18	90.3 FM	Caraquet	Ici Radio-Canada Première	public news/talk (French)
CJVA-FM	94.1 FM	Caraquet	Radio de la Baie	adult contemporary (French)
CBAL-FM-2	95.3 FM	Caraquet	Ici Musique	public music (French)
CKRO-FM	97.1 FM	Caraquet	Radio Péninsule	community radio (French)
CIMS-FM-1	96.7 FM	Dalhousie	La Coopérative Radio Restigouche	community radio (French)
CBZD-FM	96.5 FM	Doaktown	CBC Radio One	public news/talk
CFTI-FM	101.1 FM	Elsipogtog First Nation	Native Broadcasting	First Nations community radio
CJEM-FM	92.7 FM	Edmundston	Radio Edmundston	adult contemporary (French)
CBAL-FM-5	94.3 FM	Edmundston	Ici Musique	public music (French)
CBAN-FM	99.5 FM	Edmundston	CBC Radio One	public news/talk
CBAF-FM-4	100.3 FM	Edmundston	Ici Radio-Canada Première	public news/talk (French)
CFAI-FM	101.1 FM	Edmundston	La Coopérative des Montagnes	active rock (French)
CKHJ	1260 AM	Fredericton	Bell Media	country
CBAL-FM-4	88.1 FM	Fredericton	Ici Musique	public music (French)
CJPN-FM	90.5 FM	Fredericton	C médias	variety (French)
CFRK-FM	92.3 FM	Fredericton	Stingray Digital	country
CIHI-FM	93.1 FM	Fredericton	Stingray Digital	contemporary hit radio
CKTP-FM	95.7 FM	Fredericton	St. Mary's First Nation	Blues
CIXN-FM	96.5 FM	Fredericton	Joy FM Network	Christian radio
CHSR-FM	97.9 FM	Fredericton	University of New Brunswick	campus radio
CBZF-FM	99.5 FM	Fredericton	CBC Radio One	public news/talk
CBAF-FM-1	102.3 FM	Fredericton	Ici Radio-Canada Première	public news/talk (French)
CJRI-FM	104.5 FM	Fredericton	Ross Ingram	Christian radio
CFXY-FM	105.3 FM	Fredericton	Bell Media	adult hits
CIBX-FM	106.9 FM	Fredericton	Bell Media	adult contemporary
CIKX-FM	93.5 FM	Grand Falls	Maritime Broadcasting System	classic hits
CKMV-FM	95.1 FM	Grand Falls	Radio Edmundston	adult contemporary (French)
CFAI-FM-1	105.1 FM	Grand Falls	La Coopérative des Montagnes	active rock (French)
CBZA-FM	103.7 FM	Grand Manan	CBC Radio One	public news/talk
CBAF-FM-23	98.1 FM	Kedgwick	Ici Radio-Canada Première	public news/talk (French)
CJRP-FM-1	95.1 FM	Kennebecasis Valley	CJRP Ltd.	Christian radio
CBAF-FM-18	90.3 FM	Lamèque	Ici Radio-Canada Première	public news/talk (French)
CBAL-FM-2	95.3 FM	Lamèque	Ici Musique	public music (French)
CBZF-FM-1	95.5 FM	McAdam	CBC Radio One	public news/talk
CJSE-FM-1	92.5 FM	Memramcook	Capacadie	country community radio (French)
CKMA-FM	93.7 FM	Miramichi	C médias	variety (French)
CHHI-FM	95.9 FM	Miramichi	Stingray Digital	classic hits
CJFY-FM	96.5 FM	Miramichi	Miramichi Fellowship Centre	Christian radio
CBAA-FM	97.9 FM	Miramichi	CBC Radio One	public news/talk
CFAN-FM	99.3 FM	Miramichi	Maritime Broadcasting System	country
CJFY-FM-1	107.7 FM	Miramichi River Valley	Miramichi Fellowship Centre	Christian radio
CBAF-FM	88.5 FM	Moncton	Ici Radio-Canada Première	public news/talk (French)
CIRM-FM	90.1 FM	Moncton	Jack McGaw/Instant Information Services	tourist information
CFBO-FM	90.7 FM	Moncton	Radio Beausejour	adult Contemporary (French)
CKNI-FM	91.9 FM	Moncton	Acadia Broadcasting	adult contemporary
CKUM-FM	93.5 FM	Moncton	Médias acadiens universitaires inc.	campus radio (French)
CKCW-FM	94.5 FM	Moncton	Maritime Broadcasting System	adult contemporary
CBA-FM	95.5 FM	Moncton	CBC Music	public music
CJXL-FM	96.9 FM	Moncton	Stingray Digital	country
CBAL-FM	98.3 FM	Moncton	Ici Musique	public music (French)
CHOY-FM	99.9 FM	Moncton	Maritime Broadcasting System	country (French)
CJMO-FM	103.1 FM	Moncton	Stingray Digital	classic/active rock
CFQM-FM	103.9 FM	Moncton	Maritime Broadcasting System	classic hits
CITA-FM	105.1 FM	Moncton	International Harvesters for Christ Evangelistic Association	Christian radio
CBAM-FM	106.1 FM	Moncton	CBC Radio One	public news/talk
CKOE-FM	107.3 FM	Moncton	Houssen Broadcasting	Christian radio
CKMA-FM-1	102.9 FM	Neguac	C médias	variety (French)
CJRI-FM-3	99.7 FM	New Bandon	Ross Ingram	Christian radio
CKHJ-1-FM	95.1 FM	New Maryland	Bell Media	country
CIHN-FM	94.7 FM	Oromocto	Gospel Music Radio Inc.	Christian radio
CKHJ-2-FM	103.5 FM	Oromocto	Bell Media	country
CBAM-FM-1	105.7 FM	Sackville	CBC Radio One	public news/talk
CHMA-FM	106.9 FM	Sackville	Attic Broadcasting Co. Ltd.	campus radio
CFBC	930 AM	Saint John	Maritime Broadcasting System	country
CBAL-FM-4	88.1 FM	Saint John	Ici Musique	public music (French)
CHNI-FM	88.9 FM	Saint John	Stingray Digital	classic/active rock
CBD-FM	91.3 FM	Saint John	CBC Radio One	public news/talk
CHSJ-FM	94.1 FM	Saint John	Acadia Broadcasting	country
CINB-FM	96.1 FM	Saint John	Newsong Communications	oldies
CHWV-FM	97.3 FM	Saint John	Acadia Broadcasting	hot adult contemporary
CJYC-FM	98.9 FM	Saint John	Maritime Broadcasting System	classic hits
CIOK-FM	100.5 FM	Saint John	Maritime Broadcasting System	adult contemporary
CBZ-FM	101.5 FM	Saint John	CBC Music	public music
CBAF-FM-1	102.3 FM	Saint John	Ici Radio-Canada Première	public news/talk (French)
CJRP-FM	103.5 FM	Saint John	TFG Communications	Christian radio
CHQC-FM	105.7 FM	Saint John	C médias	variety (French)
CFMH-FM	107.3 FM	Saint John	University of New Brunswick Saint John	campus radio
CFJU-FM	90.1 FM	Saint-Quentin	La Radio des Hauts-Plateaux Inc. (FM90 Route 17)	French community radio (rock, country, folk)
CBAF-FM-22	91.1 FM	Saint-Quentin	Ici Radio-Canada Première	public news/talk (French)
CIRU-FM	96.5 FM	St. Stephen	Jack McGaw	tourist information
CHTD-FM	98.1 FM	St. Stephen	Acadia Broadcasting	classic hits
CBD-FM-1	106.3 FM	St. Stephen	CBC Radio One	public news/talk
CJRI-FM-2	99.9 FM	St. Stephen	Ross Ingram	Christian radio
CJSE-FM	89.5 FM	Shediac	Capacadie	country community radio (French)
CJCW-FM	92.9 FM	Sussex	Maritime Broadcasting System	adult contemporary
CITA-FM-2	107.3 FM	Sussex	International Harvesters for Christ Evangelistic Association Inc.	Christian radio
CIKX-FM-1	88.3 FM	Tobique Valley	Maritime Broadcasting System	classic hits
CBZW-FM	95.3 FM	Woodstock	CBC Radio One	public news/talk
CJRI-FM-1	101.1 FM	Woodstock	Ross Ingram	Christian radio
CJCJ-FM	104.1 FM	Woodstock	Maritime Broadcasting System	classic hits
CHIL-FM	107.7 FM	Woodstock First Nation	Skigin Radio Incorporated	First Nations community radio Approved October 19, 2023
