= Maclean-Hunter =

Defunct Canadian communications company

Maclean Hunter Limited
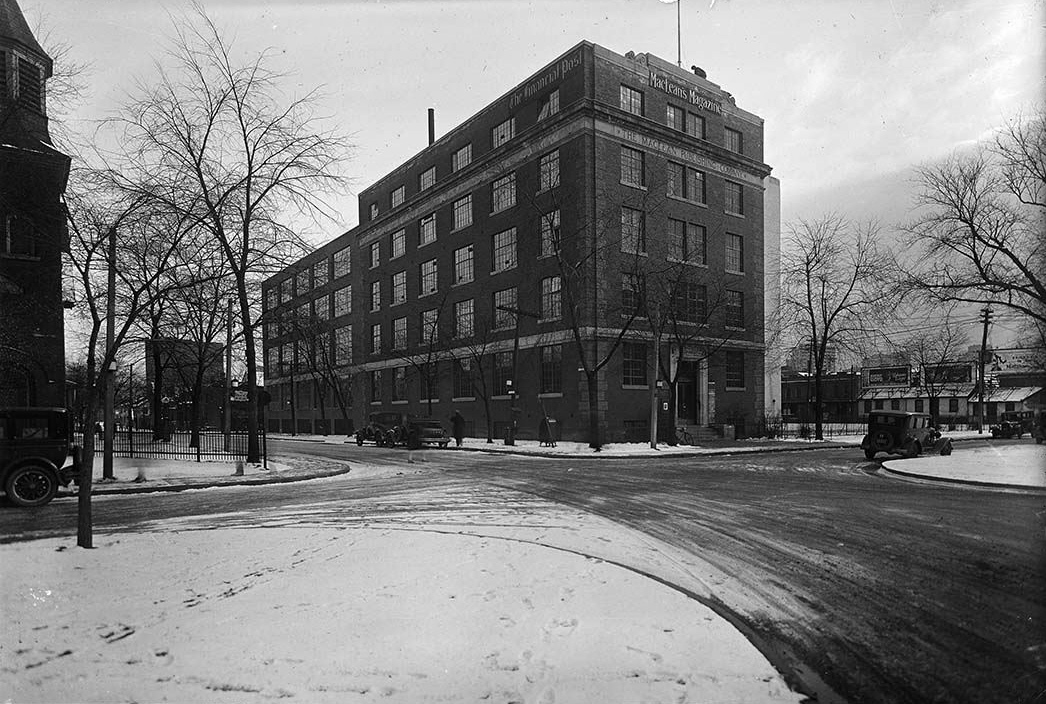
- The Maclean-Hunter Building in 1929
- Trade name: Maclean-Hunter
- Formerly: Maclean-Hunter Publishing Company Limited (1887–1961); Maclean-Hunter Limited (1961–1968)
- Type: Public
- Industry: Mass media
- Founded: 1887; 139 years ago
- Defunct: December 19, 1994; 31 years ago
- Fate: Acquired by Rogers Communications
- Successor: Rogers Sports & Media (radio assets); St. Joseph Communications (magazines); Postmedia Network (newspapers); Bell Media (CTV Television Network)
- Headquarters: College Park, Toronto, Ontario, Canada
- Products: Radio, television, magazines, newspapers and cable television
- Website: www.rogerssportsandmedia.com

Maclean Hunter Limited (M-H) was a Canadian communications company, which had diversified holdings in radio, television, magazines, newspapers and cable television distribution. The company was known for its publishing of its namesake magazine. It was founded in 1887 as Maclean-Hunter Publishing as a publisher for Canadian Grocer and General Storekeeper.

By the later half of the 20th century, the company began to expand to radio and television. As of 1991, Maclean-Hunter owned 21 radio stations, CFCN-TV in Calgary and owned a minority stake in CTV Television Network.

In 1994, Rogers Communications acquired Maclean-Hunter leading to the creation of the Rogers Sports & Media; but some of its radio stations were sold to third party companies while Sun Media was sold in an employee buyout in 1996. Comcast also acquired the American cable unit of Maclean-Hunter in 1994. Today, in addition to Rogers' ownership of its radio stations and cable television distribution, the publishing division of M-H is owned by St. Joseph Communications and Sun Media is owned by Postmedia Network. The company's headquarters were located in Toronto, Ontario.

== History ==
The company began in 1887, when brothers John Bayne Maclean and Hugh Cameron Maclean launched their first trade publication, Canadian Grocer & General Storekeeper. Hugh left the company in 1899 and later return to Toronto to establish his own publication firm. John subsequently expanded his company into other areas of publishing, launching the general interest magazine Maclean's in 1905, the business newspaper Financial Post in 1907, the lifestyle magazine Canadian Homes and Gardens in 1925, the women's magazine Chatelaine in 1928, and its French-language counterpart, Châtelaine in 1960.

Horace Talmadge Hunter joined Maclean Publishing in 1903, moving up the management ranks from general manager in 1911 to succeed John Bayne Maclean as president in 1933; in 1945 the company's name was changed to Maclean-Hunter. Hunter retired in 1952 and died in 1961. Hunter's son Donald Fleming later became president and chairman of M-H.

=== Radio and television ===
Maclean-Hunter entered broadcasting in 1961 with the acquisition of radio station CFCO in Chatham, Ontario. The company subsequently expanded its radio, television and cable holdings, and by the 1980s had become one of Canada's major privately owned broadcasting companies.

In 1989, Maclean-Hunter acquired Selkirk Communications, whose holdings included interests in approximately 23 AM and FM radio stations, several radio network operations, television stations including CHCH-TV in Hamilton and CFAC-TV in Calgary, and cable television systems in Ontario.

The acquisition also included Selkirk's broadcast representation subsidiary, All-Canada Radio & Television Ltd., which represented radio and television stations to national advertisers. Following completion of the Selkirk acquisition, Maclean-Hunter sold All-Canada to Rogers Broadcasting.

Maclean-Hunter did not retain all of the former Selkirk broadcasting properties. A number of radio stations were transferred to Rogers Broadcasting, while television properties were sold to other broadcasters. Maclean-Hunter retained CFNY-FM in Brampton and CHCH-TV in Hamilton, along with some cable television systems.

By the early 1990s, Maclean-Hunter's broadcasting assets included 21 radio stations, CHCH-TV and CFCN-TV in Calgary, a significant minority interest in the CTV Television Network, and cable television systems serving 35 Ontario markets.

When Rogers Communications acquired Maclean-Hunter in 1994, the Canadian Radio-television and Telecommunications Commission required the divestiture of a number of broadcasting assets because of concerns about concentration of ownership. Various radio stations were subsequently sold to Shaw Communications, Telemedia, Blackburn Radio and Maritime Broadcasting System, while Baton Broadcasting and Electrohome acquired CFCN-TV and Maclean-Hunter's interest in CTV.

=== Expansion and sale ===
In 1968 Maclean-Hunter Publishing Company Limited was renamed to Maclean-Hunter Limited and finally as Maclean Hunter Limited in 1981.

In the 1970s, M-H merged its Le Maclean French-language magazine with Actualité, and began publishing L'actualité. In 1982, the company acquired a controlling interest in Sun Media; ownership of the Financial Post was transferred to Sun Media for $46 millions in 1987 to facilitate the publication's expansion from a weekly to a daily newspaper. The following year Maclean Hunter acquired additional shares of Sun Media, bringing its total ownership to 60.5% of all shares (up from 50.8% in 1987).

By the early 1990s, Maclean-Hunter's assets also included cable television services in 35 Ontario markets, 21 radio stations, television station CFCN in Calgary and a significant minority share in CTV.

Maclean-Hunter was acquired in 1994 by Rogers Communications. The Canadian Radio-television and Telecommunications Commission approved the transaction, but required Rogers to divest itself of some of Maclean-Hunter's individual assets to alleviate concerns about concentration of media ownership. Shaw Communications acquired some of the cable holdings and radio stations, Telemedia and Blackburn Radio acquired other radio stations, Maritime Broadcasting System acquired the maritime stations, and the consortium of Baton Broadcasting and Electrohome acquired CFCN and the CTV shares. Sun Media was sold in an employee buyout in 1996.

Maclean-Hunter also had cable holdings in the United States, which were acquired by Comcast in 1994 for $1.27bn.

In 2016 L'actualité was sold to Mishmash (XPND Capital).

The former assets of Maclean-Hunter, including Maclean's magazine, were sold by Rogers to St. Joseph Communications in March 2019.

== Operations ==
Maclean-Hunter's main office was at College Park from the 1980s until its acquisition by Rogers in 1994. Its previous head office was in a series of buildings along the corner of Dundas Street and University Avenue. Maclean's magazine moved to Rogers Communications premises at 1 Mount Pleasant Road (Rogers Building) and remained there until it was sold to St. Joseph Communications.

In 1948, M-H moved their printing plant at 210 Dundas Street West to North York (Highway 401-Yonge Street). The large plant was built near the home of Robert Earl Bales, Reeve of North York. The plant was sold and demolished in 2001 for re-development as "Mansions of Avondale" condominiums and Avondale Park. Macleans along with other Rogers Media print publications are now printed by Transcontinental.

== Presidents ==
- John Bayne Maclean — 1887-1933
- Horace Talmadge Hunter — 1933-1952
- Floyd Chalmers — 1952-1964 - chairman 1964-1969
- Donald Fleming Hunter — 1964-1976 - later as chairman
- Frederick T. Metcalf — 1977-1984 - later as chairman
- Donald Graham Campbell — 1984-1986
- Ronald Osborne — 1986-1994

== Assets ==
At the time of Maclean-Hunter's takeover by Rogers in 1994, the company owned the following assets:

=== Television ===
Rogers immediately spun off Maclean-Hunter's television assets. Baton Broadcasting and Electrohome acquired CFCN-TV and Maclean-Hunter's share of CTV, a transaction which moved Baton significantly closer to its eventual takeover of the entire CTV network. Shaw acquired Maclean-Hunter's share in the New Country Network, which was licensed but had not yet launched at the time of the takeover.

- Calgary - CFCN-TV
- 14.3% of CTV
- 60% of New Country Network

=== Radio ===
Maclean-Hunter owned 21 radio stations. Most were spun off by Rogers to other owners; only the Kitchener and Ottawa stations are still owned by Rogers today.

- Amherst - CKDH
- Brampton - CFNY
- Campbellton - CKNB
- Charlottetown - CFCY, CHLQ
- Chatham - CFCO
- Halifax - CHNS, CHFX
- Kitchener - CKGL, CHYM
- Leamington - CHYR
- Moncton - CKCW, CFQM
- Newcastle - CFAN
- Ottawa - CIWW, CKBY
- Saint John - CIOK
- Sarnia - CKTY, CFGX
- Sussex - CJCW
- Toronto - CKYC

=== Cable television ===
Maclean-Hunter Cable served the following markets in Ontario. These were acquired by Rogers, although some were later sold to Shaw Cable or Cogeco. Shaw's share was sold to Rogers in 2023.

- Ajax
- Alexandria
- Alfred
- Arnprior
- Beachburg
- Bourget
- Carp
- Chalk River
- Cobden
- Collingwood
- Deep River
- Guelph
- Hamilton
- Hawkesbury
- Huntsville
- Lancaster
- Limoges
- London
- Maxville
- Midland
- Niagara Falls
- North Bay
- Ottawa (west of Bank Street)
- Owen Sound
- Pakenham
- Pembroke
- Peterborough
- Renfrew
- St. Catharines
- St. Isidore de Prescott
- Sarnia
- Sault Ste. Marie
- Thunder Bay
- Toronto
- Wallaceburg

== See also ==
- Rogers Cable
- Xfinity
- Media ownership in Canada
