= Media in Moncton =

This is a list of the television stations, radio stations, magazines and newspapers in Moncton, New Brunswick.

== Television stations ==
OTA virtual channel (PSIP)	OTA actual channel	Rogers Cable	Call sign	Network	Notes
11.1	11 (VHF)	12	CBAFT-DT	Ici Radio-Canada Télé	
27.1	27 (UHF)	6	CHNB-DT-3	Global	
29.1	29 (UHF)	8	CKCW-DT	CTV	

== Radio stations ==
FM

Frequency	Callsign	Branding	Format	Owner
FM 88.5	CBAF-FM	Ici Radio-Canada Première	News/Talk and Flagship Première station for Atlantic Canada (French)	Canadian Broadcasting Corporation
FM 89.5	CJSE-FM	Country 89	Country/community radio (French) Studios are in Shediac and is licensed to Moncton (Rebroadcaster CJSE-FM-1, 92.5 FM Memramcook)	Radio Beausejour Inc.
FM 90.1	CIRM-FM	Information Radio group	Tourist information radio station (English)	
FM 90.7	CFBO-FM	Plus 95.7	hot adult contemporary/community radio (French)	Radio Beausejour Inc.
FM 91.9	CKNI-FM	91.9 The Bend	Adult Contemporary (English) CKNI is a former news talk format (2004-2014); switched owners and format in August 2014.	Acadia Broadcasting
FM 93.5	CKUM-FM	Université de Moncton	Campus radio/community radio (French)	Les Médias acadiens universitaires, inc.
FM 94.5	CKCW-FM	K94.5	Hot adult contemporary (English)	Maritime Broadcasting System
FM 95.5	CBA-FM	CBC Music	adult album alternative, folk, world music, classical music (English) (Rebroadcasters of CBH-FM, Halifax)	Canadian Broadcasting Corporation
FM 96.9	CJXL-FM	New Country 96-9	Country (English)	Stingray Group
FM 98.3	CBAL-FM	Ici Musique	Classical, jazz and folk (French)	Canadian Broadcasting Corporation
FM 99.9	CHOY-FM	Choix-FM 99.9, L'Acadie country	Country (French)	Maritime Broadcasting System
FM 103.1	CJMO-FM	Q103	Mainstream Rock (English)	Stingray Group
FM 103.9	CFQM-FM	Max-FM	Classic Hits (English)	Maritime Broadcasting System
FM 105.1	CITA-FM	CITA	Christian music (English)	International Harvesters for Christ Evangelistic Association Inc.
FM 106.1	CBAM-FM	CBC Radio One	News and information (English)	Canadian Broadcasting Corporation
FM 107.3	CKOE-FM	CKO Radio	Contemporary Christian music (English)	Houssen Broadcasting

Internet radio stations

Frequency	Branding	Format	Owner
plusfm.ca	Plus FM	hot adult contemporary (English)	PLUS FM RADIO Inc.

Major radio broadcasting companies in the Greater Moncton area.

- CBC/Radio-Canada
- Maritime Broadcasting System
- Stingray Radio
- Acadia Broadcasting

== Internet Radio ==
- plusfm.ca

== Defunct AM radio stations ==
- CKCW-AM 1220 kHz (1370 kHz - 1934 to 1941) (1400 kHz - 1941 to 1946) (1220 kHz - 1946 to 2001)

AM signal signed off on April 11, 2001, having moved to 94.5 FM as CKCW-FM.

- CBA-AM 1070 kHz (1050 kHz - 1939 to 1941) (1070 kHz - 1941 to 2008)

CBC FM transmitter signed on in January 2008 and the call sign was changed to CBAM-FM. The 50,000-watt clear-channel station outlet for the Maritimes was the last AM station in eastern New Brunswick (signed off in April 2008). Its transmitter site was on Dover Road in Dieppe.

- CBAF-AM 1300 kHz (1954–1988)

AM transmitter was discontinued in 1988 and after eight years of simulcasting the FM transmitter, it became the station's primary frequency. Its former AM transmitter was located on Amirault Street, Dieppe.

- CHLR-AM 1380 kHz (1981–1985)

French-language radio station which had an effective radiated power of 10,000 watts. Studios located in the former CKCW AM premises at the lobby of the Assomption Place from 1981 to 1985.

== Magazines ==
=== Monthly ===
- Best Version Media (Moncton) - distributed throughout the Moncton North and Irishtown / Tankville neighbourhoods; anglophone

== Newspapers ==
=== Dailies ===
- L'Acadie Nouvelle - francophone
- Telegraph-Journal (Saint John) - distributed throughout the province; anglophone
- Times & Transcript - anglophone

=== Weeklies ===
- L'Étoile - Édition Dieppe - francophone
