= Media in Saint John, New Brunswick =

This is a list of media in Saint John, New Brunswick.

== Radio ==
| Frequency | Call sign | Branding | Format | Owner | Notes |
|---|---|---|---|---|---|
| 930 AM | CFBC | 93CFBC | country | Maritime Broadcasting System | |
| 88.1 FM | CBAL-FM-4 | Ici Musique | francophone music | Canadian Broadcasting Corporation | repeats CBAL-FM Moncton |
| 88.9 FM | CHNI-FM | Q88.9 | Mainstream rock | Stingray Group | |
| 91.3 FM | CBD-FM | CBC Radio One | news/talk | Canadian Broadcasting Corporation | |
| 94.1 FM | CHSJ-FM | Country 94 | country | Acadia Broadcasting | |
| 96.1 FM | CINB-FM | Oldies96 | oldies | CINB -FM Communications | |
| 97.3 FM | CHWV-FM | 97.3 The Wave | hot adult contemporary | Acadia Broadcasting | |
| 98.9 FM | CJYC-FM | KOOL 98 | classic hits | Maritime Broadcasting System | |
| 100.5 FM | CIOK-FM | K100 | adult contemporary | Maritime Broadcasting System | |
| 101.5 FM | CBZ-FM | CBC Music | music | Canadian Broadcasting Corporation | repeats CBH-FM Halifax |
| 102.3 FM | CBAF-FM-1 | Ici Radio-Canada Première | francophone news/talk | Canadian Broadcasting Corporation | repeats CBAF-FM Moncton |
| 103.5 FM | CJRP-FM | CKO-2 | Christian contemporary | Houssen Broadcasting | |
| 105.7 FM | CHQC-FM | L'onde francophone de Saint-Jean | francophone community radio | Coopérative radiophonique – La Brise de la Baie | |
| 107.3 FM | CFMH-FM | Local 107.3fm | campus radio | University of New Brunswick, Saint John | |

== Television ==
- Channel 9 / Cable 8: CKLT-DT, CTV
- Channel 12 / Cable 6: CHNB-DT, Global (semi-satellite of CIHF-DT Halifax)
- Cable 10 Rogers Television

== Newspapers ==
- The Telegraph-Journal, (daily)
- Le Saint-Jeannois (monthly)
- West Side Tides (weekly)
- Coffee News (weekly)
- WesTides (Bi-weekly)
