= CJCW-FM =

Radio station in Sussex, New Brunswick

Coordinates: 45°41′06″N 65°31′26″W

- Sussex, New Brunswick; Canada
- Broadcast area: Kings County
- Frequency: 92.9 MHz (FM)
- Branding: CJCW 92.9 FM

Programming
- Language: English
- Format: Adult contemporary

Ownership
- Owner: Maritime Broadcasting System

History
- First air date: June 14, 1975
- Former call signs: CJCW (1959–2024)
- Former frequencies: 590 kHz (1959–2024)

Technical information
- Class: A
- Power: 723 watts (1,400 watts maximum)
- HAAT: 97.6 meters (320 ft)

Links
- Webcast: Listen Live
- Website: 590cjcw.com

CJCW-FM is a Canadian radio station broadcasting at 92.9 FM in Sussex, New Brunswick. The station airs an adult contemporary format and is owned & operated by the Maritime Broadcasting System. The station has been on the air since June 14, 1975.

== History ==
Island Radio was granted approval on November 8, 1975 to broadcast in Sussex with a power of 500 watts during the day, and 250 watts at night. Overnight programming was provided by CKCW-FM in Moncton.

On June 15, 1975, CJCW first began broadcasting at 590 kHz. On April 7, 1978, the daytime operating power was increased to 1000 watts. Night operation was left at 250 watts.

In 1986, the station was acquired by Maritime Broadcasting System.

In 2000, CJCW switched to full-time local programming instead of simulcasting CKCW during overnight periods. The station was branded as Favourites 590 CJCW.

On September 10, 2007, the station (along with sister stations CKNB-FM, CFAN-FM and CKDH-FM) was rebranded to 590 CJCW with "Your community, your radio station" as the positioning statement. CJCW also used The Best Hits of Yesterday and Today.

=== AM to FM ===
On May 5, 2023, Maritime Broadcasting System Limited submitted an application to convert CJCW 590 to the FM band. The station would operate at 92.9 MHz with an average effective radiated power (ERP) of 725 watts (directional antenna with a maximum ERP of 1,400 watts with an effective height of antenna above average terrain [EHAAT] of 97 metres). The application was approved by the CRTC on February 9, 2024. In nearly three months after the approval, CJCW moved to 92.9 FM on May 4, 2024.

== Former logos ==
2001-2017

2017-2024

== See also ==
- Maritime Broadcasting System
