= Bounce (radio network) =

Canadian radio network

- Type: Radio network
- Country: Canada

Programming
- Format: Adult hits

Ownership
- Owner: Bell Media Radio (Bell Media)

History
- Founded: by Bell Media
- Launch date: May 18, 2021

Links
- Website: www.bounceradio.ca

Bounce is a Canadian radio network, that airs on stations owned by Bell Media. It launched on May 18, 2021, with an adult hits format. The network currently broadcasts on five stations nationwide.

== History ==
It was announced on May 18, 2021, that 25 Bell Media stations across Canada would flip to the adult hits format on that day. These stations would air songs from the 1980s, the 1990s, and the 2000s. Most of the stations that joined the flip were under the brandings of Bob FM, EZ Rock, The Dock, and The Bear.

On February 8, 2024, Bell announced a restructuring that included the sale of 45 of its 103 radio stations to seven buyers, subject to approval by the CRTC, including 20 Bounce stations being sold to ZoomerMedia, Golden Horseshoe Broadcasting, Maritime Broadcasting System, Durham Radio, Vista Radio and My Broadcasting Corporation. The respective sales were approved by the CRTC on December 12, 2024, December 19, 2024, December 20, 2024, January 30, 2025, February 13, 2025, and February 26, 2025.

On July 28, 2026, the Bounce Radio station in Kitchener swapped frequencies from 99.5 FM to 105.3 FM.

== Stations ==
Current Bounce stations
| City | Call sign | Frequency | Branding | Former branding | Owner |
|---|---|---|---|---|---|
| Brandon, Manitoba | CKX-FM | FM 96.1 | Bounce 96.1 | Bob FM | Bell Media Radio |
| Fredericton, New Brunswick | CFXY-FM | FM 105.3 | Bounce 105.3 | Fox 105.3 | Bell Media Radio |
| Midland, Ontario | CICZ-FM | FM 104.1 | Bounce 104.1 | The Dock | Bell Media Radio |
| Kitchener, Ontario | CKKW-FM | FM 105.3 | Bounce 105.3 | 105.3 Virgin Radio | Bell Media Radio |
| Winnipeg, Manitoba | CFWM-FM | FM 99.9 | Bounce 99.9 | Bob FM | Bell Media Radio |

=== Former stations ===
Former Bounce stations
| City | Call sign | Frequency | Branding | Previous branding | Current branding | Owner |
|---|---|---|---|---|---|---|
| Bathurst, New Brunswick | CKBC-FM | FM 104.9 | Bounce 104.9 | 104.9 Max FM | The Wave | Maritime Broadcasting System |
| Brockville, Ontario | CJPT-FM | FM 103.7 | Bounce 103.7 | Bob FM | Giant FM | My Broadcasting Corporation |
| Fort Nelson, British Columbia | CKRX-FM | FM 102.3 | Bounce 102.3 | The Bear | Summit | Vista Radio |
| Fort St. John, British Columbia | CKNL-FM | FM 101.5 | Bounce 101.5 | The Bear | The Goat | Vista Radio |
| Golden, British Columbia | CKGR-FM | FM 106.3 | Bounce 106.3 | EZ Rock | Summit | Vista Radio |
| Grand Falls, New Brunswick | CIKX-FM | FM 93.5 | Bounce 93 | K93 | The Wave | Maritime Broadcasting System |
| Hamilton, Ontario | CKLH-FM | FM 102.9 | Bounce 102.9 | 102.9 K-Lite | Legend 102.9 | Golden Horseshoe Broadcasting |
| Kawartha Lakes, Ontario | CKLY-FM | FM 91.9 | Bounce 91.9 | Bob FM | Y91.9 | Durham Radio |
| Kitchener, Ontario | CKKW-FM | FM 99.5 | Bounce 99.5 | KFUN 99.5 | 99.5 Virgin Radio | Bell Media Radio |
| Kitimat, British Columbia | CKTK-FM | FM 97.7 | Bounce 97.7 | EZ Rock | Summit | Vista Radio |
| Nelson, British Columbia | CKKC-FM | FM 106.9 | Bounce Radio | EZ Rock | Summit | Vista Radio |
| Osoyoos, British Columbia | CJOR | AM 1240 | Bounce 1240 | EZ Rock | Summit | Vista Radio |
| Owen Sound, Ontario | CJOS-FM | FM 92.3 | Bounce 92.3 | The Dock | Zoomer | ZoomerMedia |
| Penticton, British Columbia | CKOR | AM 800 | Bounce 800 | EZ Rock | Summit | Vista Radio |
| Prince Rupert, British Columbia | CHTK-FM | FM 99.1 | Bounce 99.1 | EZ Rock | Coast FM | Vista Radio |
| Revelstoke, British Columbia | CKCR-FM | FM 106.1 | Bounce 106.1 | EZ Rock | Summit | Vista Radio |
| Salmon Arm, British Columbia | CKXR-FM | FM 91.5 | Bounce 91.5 | EZ Rock | Summit | Vista Radio |
| Summerland, British Columbia | CHOR-FM | FM 98.5 | Bounce 98.5 | EZ Rock | Summit | Vista Radio |
| Terrace, British Columbia | CFTK | AM 590 | Bounce 590 | EZ Rock | Summit | Vista Radio |
| Trail, British Columbia | CJAT-FM | FM 95.7 | Bounce Radio | EZ Rock | Summit | Vista Radio |
| Truro, Nova Scotia | CKTO-FM | FM 100.9 | Bounce 100.9 | 100.9 Big Dog | The Wave | Maritime Broadcasting System |
