= CKCL =

CKCL may refer to:

- CKCL-FM, a radio station (107.1 FM) licensed to Winnipeg, Manitoba, Canada, which now holds the CKCL call sign since 2013.
- CKKS-FM, a radio station (104.9 FM) licensed to Chilliwack, British Columbia, Canada, which held the CKCL call sign from 2004 to 2009.
- CKTY-FM, a radio station (99.5 FM) licensed to Truro, Nova Scotia, Canada, which held the call sign CKCL from 1947 to 2001
- CKTO-FM, a radio station (100.9 FM) licensed to Truro, Nova Scotia, Canada, which held the call sign CKCL-FM from 1965 to the mid-1970s
- CKCL, a Toronto radio station from 1925 until 1945 when it became CKEY. Now known as CHKT.
