= Fundy Cable =

Canadian cable television provider

Fundy Cable was a Canadian cable television provider, which served all major New Brunswick communities except for the Sackville area at the time of its purchase by Shaw Communications for 312M USD in 1999. Its operations were later acquired by Rogers Cable.

Fundy was based in Saint John, which was the first city in which it provided cable services. During the 1980s and early 1990s it purchased other cable companies in New Brunswick, including Fredericton Cablevision, Cable Service Ltd. in Moncton, and Cable 2000 in the northern part of the province.

Founded by C. William (Bill) Stanley, member of the Stanley family from North Head of Grand Manan Island. He received an Electrical Engineering degree from University of New Brunswick before entering the Telecommunications field and becoming a successful Cable Television pioneer and New Brunswick business leader. Mr. Stanley was part of the engineering cohort that built the first campus radio station CHSR FM at the University of New Brunswick in Fredericton, which after going live-to-air in 1961, cemented a life-long interest in Radio Broadcasting.

Prior to starting Fundy Cable in 1971 in partnership with James Alexander MacMurray, Stanley worked in the United States for the United Telephone Company in the Kansas City area. United was an early participant in the US cable market in the 1960s and inspired Stanley's early ambition to bring the technology to Canada.

An early expert in Microwave technology, Mr. Stanley played a hands-on role in the physical placement of the first microwave installations in New Brunswick that carried US television signals into the Eastern Canadian market which was a revolutionary development at the time. Mr. Stanley himself hiked up Chamcook Mountain near the Canada/US border to scout transmission sites as part of the early effort to build out cable service for the Saint John market.

Fundy Cable went through various restructurings and corporate incarnations between 1971 and 1999. This included issuing an IPO in the early 90's, followed by the company going private again in the mid-90's, still under the control of Stanley and MacMurray. Fundy Cable also owned Fundy Broadcasting from the early 70's onward. Fundy Broadcasting managed a number of radio stations, including CFBC in Saint John, NB. The radio stations were eventually sold to Maritime Broadcasting in 1997. Another notable investment, in partnership with Sasktel, was the acquisition in 1991 of Midlands Cable of the United Kingdom, which served over 336,000 subscribers in the Leicester and Loughborough areas. Midlands was subsequently sold to Diamond Cable in 1995.

Fundy also acquired NCA Microelectronics, which patented the Chameleon scrambling chip for pay-television set-top boxes. NCA Microelectronics was initially formed in 1987 by Harvey Nickerson and Lewis Cobb, two young electrical engineering graduates of the University of New Brunswick. This was considered an excellent acquisition owing to the complimentary nature of the technology that NCA created at the outset of the pay-TV industry. NCA gave Fundy an export product as well a low cost basis to offer services.

The company also expanded outside of core communications activities by acquiring Cox electronics stores and re-naming them Cable World in a not very successful attempt to enter the household electronics and video rental market. The company acquired and sold a real estate firm (Fundy II Real Estate) in rapid succession, eventually citing an overall lack of understanding for how that market actually functioned.

In the early 90's, the Fundy Group also established Fundy Deer Farms, an ill-fated attempt to establish a 500 hectare commercial venison breeding operation near Cambridge Narrows, NB. This experiment came to a tragic end after the Government of Canada ordered the slaughter of 4000 animals after a Professor of Agriculture at UNB raised concerns of a possible parasite in the New Zealand Red Deer that Fundy had imported for the purposes of starting a massive breeding operation with the goal of popularizing venison. Operating under the assumption that such a parasite could infect the indigenous deer population, the Canadian Food Inspection Agency brought in a mobile abattoir and culled the herd. No parasites were ultimately discovered, leading to a lawsuit between Lloyd's of London, as the insurer of Fundy Deer Farms, and the Government of Canada. An out of court settlement was reached with terms not publicly disclosed. It is rumoured that out of spite, and because the meat of the slaughtered animals could not be sold, that the Stanley family ate venison for the next 7 years. On a lighter and more positive note, the lineage of deer initially sold to other farms, such as Tobin Farms, are still producing off-spring to this day.

Throughout the life of the Fundy family of companies, there was a prevailing ethos and pride related to the company having been born in New Brunswick and built by many hands. Many long term employees stayed throughout their careers, even after acquisition by Rogers. One notable legacy of Bill Stanley was that he learned the name of every single employee he met- of which there were thousands over the years- and continued to greet everyone by name over the course of many years. This commitment to creating a "family" environment was also characterized by the company having many popular leaders that rallied the workers in their home communities to build a modern enterprise, creating a true Maritime "all boats rise with the tide" philosophy.

The unofficial symbol for the company, as photographed by career Fundy employee Norman Fanjoy, was Swallowtail lighthouse, which is located near Stanley Beach on North Head, Grand Manan in the Bay of Fundy.

https://www.nytimes.com/1999/04/30/business/company-news-shaw-in-312-million-deal-for-fundy-communications.html==References==
