= CKTY =

CKTY may refer to:

- CKTY-FM, a radio station (99.5 FM) licensed to Truro, Nova Scotia, Canada
- CHKS-FM, a radio station (106.3 FM) licensed to Sarnia, Ontario, Canada, which held the call sign CKTY from 1987 to 1999
