= CKCW =

CKCW may refer to:

- CKCW-FM, a radio station (94.5 FM) licensed to Moncton, New Brunswick, Canada
- CKCW-TV, a television station (channel 2) licensed to Moncton, New Brunswick, Canada
