= CKPE-FM =

Radio station in Sydney, Nova Scotia

Coordinates: 46°10′48″N 60°11′33″W

- Sydney, Nova Scotia; Canada
- Broadcast area: Cape Breton Island
- Frequency: 94.9 MHz
- Branding: 94.9 The Wave

Programming
- Format: Classic hits

Ownership
- Owner: Maritime Broadcasting System
- Sister stations: CJCB, CHER-FM

History
- First air date: 1957
- Former call signs: CJCB-FM
- Call sign meaning: Cape Breton (broadcast area)

Technical information
- Class: C
- ERP: 61 kW
- HAAT: 51 metres (167 ft)

Links
- Webcast: Listen live
- Website: 949thewave.com

CKPE-FM is a Canadian radio station broadcasting from Sydney, Nova Scotia at 94.9 FM. The station broadcasts a classic hits format branded as 94.9 The Wave. The station has been on the air since 1957 under the original call sign CJCB-FM.

The station is owned and operated by the Maritime Broadcasting System. CJCB and CHER-FM are its sister stations.

Every weekend, CKPE plays vintage American Top 40 countdown shows hosted by Casey Kasem, one from the 1980s every Saturday morning, and one from the 1970s every Sunday morning. Sister stations CHNS-FM in Halifax, CKTO-FM in Truro, Nova Scotia, CFQM-FM in Moncton, CIKX-FM in Grand Falls, New Brunswick, CJCJ-FM in Woodstock, New Brunswick, CKBC-FM in Bathurst, New Brunswick and CJYC-FM in Saint John also do this.

== History ==
CKPE was an easy listening station until June 1, 1981 when it switched to a country format. CKPE stayed with this format until June 1998 when it switched formats with sister station CJCB, becoming a Hot AC station and CJCB going country. It was Hot AC until summer 2011 when it changed its format to adult contemporary. The station's branding at the time was The Cape 94.9.

On December 26, 2019, the station changed its format to classic hits and rebranded as 94.9 The Wave. The station's format is similar to that of sister stations CHNS-FM in Halifax, CFQM-FM in Moncton and CJYC-FM in Saint John. Prior to the format change, the station played Christmas music since the beginning of December.
