= CJCJ-FM =

Radio station in Woodstock, New Brunswick

Coordinates: 46°08′28″N 67°35′54″W

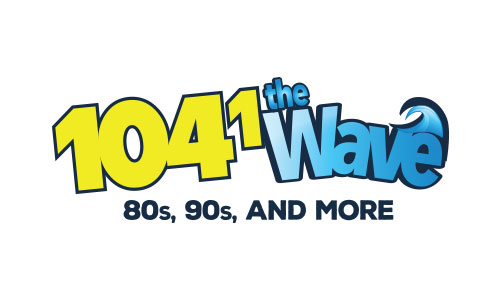
- Woodstock, New Brunswick; Canada
- Broadcast area: Woodstock Parish
- Frequency: 104.1 MHz (FM)
- Branding: 104.1 The Wave

Programming
- Format: Classic hits

Ownership
- Owner: Maritime Broadcasting System

History
- First air date: July 1, 1959
- Former call signs: CJCJ (1959–2001)
- Former frequencies: 920 kHz (1959–2001)
- Call sign meaning: "CJ" (former branding)

Technical information
- Class: B
- ERP: 10,000 watts
- HAAT: 68 metres (223 ft)

Links
- Webcast: Listen Live
- Website: thewavewoodstock.com

CJCJ-FM is a Canadian radio station broadcasting from Woodstock, New Brunswick at 104.1 FM. The station is currently owned and operated by the Maritime Broadcasting System. The station broadcasts a classic hits format branded as 104.1 The Wave.

== History ==
CJCJ originally began broadcasting on 920 kHz in July 1959, and moved to FM in the early 2000s. Originally owned by Carleton-Victoria Broadcasting Limited, it was acquired in 1991 by Radio One Ltd. In 1999, Radio One was acquired by Telemedia, and in 2002, Telemedia was purchased by Standard Broadcasting. CJCJ was one of the stations that Standard in turn sold to Astral Media in 2007, and then to Bell Media in 2013.

In 1989, Carleton-Victoria Broadcasting Co. Ltd. received approval from the Canadian Radio-television and Telecommunications Commission (CRTC) to operate two low-power AM transmitters at Plaster Rock on 990 kHz (40 watts), and Perth/Andover on 1140 kHz with 40 watts. These transmitters would rebroadcast the programs of CJCJ 920 Woodstock.

In 1998, Carleton-Victoria Broadcasting Co. Ltd. received approval from the CRTC to add an FM rebroadcaster at Grand Falls to operate on the frequency of 93.5 MHz. On June 7, 2000, Telemedia Radio Atlantic Ltd. received CRTC approval to add a transmitter for CIKX-FM Grand Falls at Plaster Rock, using the facilities of the CJCJ Woodstock rebroadcasting transmitter, CJCJ-2 Plaster Rock. As a result of the change, the CJCJ rebroadcasters CJCJ-1 Perth/Andover and CJCJ-2 Plaster Rock were deleted.

In May 2009, CJCJ changed its format to hot adult contemporary as CJ104.

In November 2020, the station flipped to country as Pure Country 104.

On February 8, 2024, Bell announced a restructuring that included the sale of 45 of its 103 radio stations to seven buyers, subject to approval by the CRTC, including CJCJ, which is to be sold to the Maritime Broadcasting System. The CRTC approved the sale on December 20, 2024. On April 8, 2025, the station flipped to classic hits, branded as "104.1 The Wave."

Every weekend, CJCJ plays vintage American Top 40 countdown shows hosted by Casey Kasem, one from the 1980s every Saturday morning, and one from the 1970s every Sunday morning. Sister stations CHNS-FM in Halifax, Nova Scotia, CKPE-FM in Sydney, CKTO-FM in Truro, Nova Scotia, CFQM-FM in Moncton, CIKX-FM in Grand Falls, New Brunswick, CKBC-FM in Bathurst, New Brunswick and CJYC-FM in Saint John also do this.

== Former logo ==
Logo created in 2009 and used until November 19, 2020.

Pure Country 104 2020-2025.
