= CHNS-FM =

Radio station in Halifax, Nova Scotia

Coordinates: 44°38′31.6″N 63°34′14.8″W

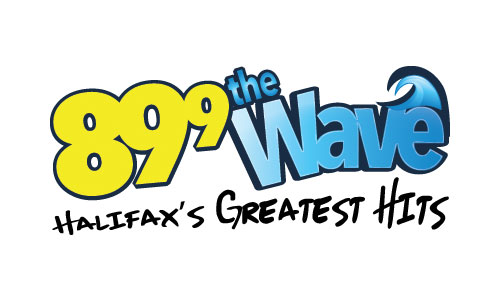
- Halifax, Nova Scotia; Canada
- Broadcast area: Halifax Regional Municipality
- Frequency: 89.9 MHz
- Branding: 89.9 The Wave

Programming
- Format: Classic hits

Ownership
- Owner: Maritime Broadcasting System
- Sister stations: CHFX-FM

History
- First air date: May 12, 1926
- Former frequencies: 930 kHz (AM) (1926–1930, 1934-1941); 910 kHz (1930–1934); 960 kHz (1941–2006); 6.135/6.13 MHz (1955?-2001)
- Call sign meaning: Canada Halifax Nova Scotia (broadcast area)

Technical information
- Class: C1
- ERP: 100,000 watts horizontal polarization only
- HAAT: 224 metres (735 ft)

Links
- Webcast: Listen Live
- Website: 899thewave.fm

CHNS-FM (89.9 MHz) is a commercial FM radio station, in Halifax, Nova Scotia, Canada. The station airs a classic hits radio format branded as 89.9 The Wave. CHNS is owned and operated by the Maritime Broadcasting System which also owns sister station CHFX-FM.

CHNS-FM's studios and offices are located on Lovett Lake Court in Halifax. The transmitter is located on Washmill Lake Drive in Clayton Park.

== History ==
CHNS was Nova Scotia's first radio station, signing on the air on May 12, 1926, originally on 930 AM. In 1930, it switched to 910 but switched back to 930 four years later. In 1941, it switched to 960.

It was the host of Canadian National Railway radio "phantom station" CNRH until that network was disbanded. CHNS was an affiliate of the Canadian Radio Broadcasting Commission from 1933 to 1936 when the network became the Canadian Broadcasting Corporation. It acted as a CBC outlet until 1945 when CBH was launched as a CBC-owned station. CHNS then became an affiliate of the CBC's Dominion Network until 1960.

From the 1940s to the 1980s, CHNS employed personalities who would go on to become some of Canada's top broadcasters, including Knowlton Nash, Mike Duffy, Stan Carew and Ian Hanomansing, as well as personalities with more of a local impact (Jerry Lawrence.) CHNS had an intense Top 40 ratings war with rival station CJCH during the 1970s.

During the 1980s and early 1990s, the station played an adult contemporary format. In February 1992, it flipped to oldies, branding itself Oldies 96 CHNS. It was among a handful of AM stations broadcasting in C-QUAM stereo.

The station received CRTC approval to move to FM in April 2006. It moved to its current frequency at 89.9 FM in July of that year, adopting a classic rock format as 89.9 HAL FM. CHNS was given permission to simulcast the FM programming for 90 days on the AM signal. On October 19, 2006, the AM signal was shut down, putting an end to 80 years of broadcasting on the AM dial. The old transmitter house was demolished in 2008.

On August 30, 2013, at 8 a.m., CHNS-FM flipped to classic hits, branded as 89.9 The Wave. The move came 4 days after CKUL-FM flipped to Adult Album Alternative. (CKUL-FM is now an adult contemporary music station.)

Every weekend, CHNS plays vintage American Top 40 countdown shows hosted by Casey Kasem, one from the 1980s every Saturday morning, and one from the 1970s every Sunday morning. Sister stations CKPE-FM in Sydney, CKTO-FM in Truro, Nova Scotia, CFQM-FM in Moncton, CIKX-FM in Grand Falls, New Brunswick, CJCJ-FM in Woodstock, New Brunswick, CKBC-FM in Bathurst, New Brunswick and CJYC-FM in Saint John also do this.

=== Shortwave relay ===
CHNS programming was also heard on shortwave radio. It first simulcast on 6.110 MHz beginning in 1931 on experimental shortwave relay station VE9HX. The station was listened to around the world when it carried live coverage of the Moose River mine disaster in 1936. Five-minute long hourly updates by CHNS reporter J. Frank Willis were relayed over CHNX for five days and were listened to worldwide and simulcast over 650 radio stations in North America. The broadcasts were carried across Canada over the Canadian Broadcasting Corporation as well as stations across the United States and the BBC. It was the first live 24-hour radio coverage of a breaking news story in Canada.

In 1937, the shortwave station was assigned the call letters CHNX. By the mid-1990s, due to problems with the aging shortwave transmitter, power had been reduced from 500 watts to 40 to 70 watts. The station went off the air in 2000 due to transmitter failure, but returned following repairs. It went off the air permanently in 2001 as station owner Maritime Broadcasting was unwilling to invest in a new transmitter.
