= CKBC-FM =

Radio station in Bathurst, New Brunswick

Coordinates: 47°37′00″N 65°36′46″W

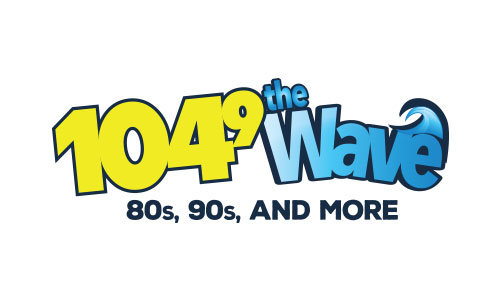
- Bathurst, New Brunswick; Canada
- Frequency: 104.9 MHz
- Branding: 104.9 The Wave

Programming
- Format: Classic hits

Ownership
- Owner: Maritime Broadcasting System

History
- First air date: April 18, 1955
- Former frequencies: 1400 kHz (AM) (1955–1966); 1360 kHz (1966–2003)

Technical information
- Class: B
- ERP: 33,500 watts
- HAAT: 46.2 metres (152 ft)

Links
- Webcast: Listen Live
- Website: thewavebathurst.com

CKBC-FM is a Canadian radio station broadcasting in Bathurst, New Brunswick at 104.9 MHz with an effective radiated power of 33,500 watts. The station has been broadcasting since April 18, 1955.

The station is currently owned by the Maritime Broadcasting System.

== History ==
In 1954, Bathurst Broadcasting Co. Ltd. received approval to operate an English and French-language AM station with a power of 250 watts. CKBC was originally broadcast on 1400 kHz, and by 1966, had moved to 1360 kHz. The station increased power from 250 to 10,000 watts. Over the years, CKBC went through a number of ownerships. In 2002, CKBC and Telemedia Radio Atlantic's other radio stations were purchased by Astral Media. On November 14, 2003, CKBC was given approval to switch to the FM band. In 2004, the new FM station became Max 104.9 with an adult contemporary format.

On June 27, 2013, the CRTC approved an application by Astral Media Inc. to sell its pay and specialty television channels, conventional television stations and radio stations to BCE Inc., including CKBC-FM.

As part of a mass format reorganization by Bell Media, on May 18, 2021, CKBC dropped the longtime Max 104.9 branding and flipped to adult hits, and adopted the Bounce branding.

On February 8, 2024, Bell announced a restructuring that included the sale of 45 of its 103 radio stations to seven buyers, subject to approval by the CRTC, including CKBC, which is to be sold to Maritime Broadcasting System. The CRTC approved the sale on December 20, 2024.

On April 8, 2025, the station rebranded to "104.9 The Wave".

Every weekend, CKBC plays vintage American Top 40 countdown shows hosted by Casey Kasem, one from the 1980s every Saturday morning, and one from the 1970s every Sunday morning. Sister stations CHNS-FM in Halifax, Nova Scotia, CKPE-FM in Sydney, CKTO-FM in Truro, Nova Scotia, CFQM-FM in Moncton, CIKX-FM in Grand Falls, New Brunswick, CJCJ-FM in Woodstock, New Brunswick, and CJYC-FM in Saint John also do this.
