= Financial Post =

English Canadian business newspaper

- Type: Daily Newspaper
- Format: Newspaper
- Owner: Postmedia Network
- Founder: John Bayne Maclean
- Founded: 1907
- Headquarters: Toronto
- ISSN: 0838-8431
- Website: www.financialpost.com

The Financial Post is a financial news website, and business section of the National Post, both publications of the Postmedia Network. It started as an English Canadian business newspaper called The Financial Post, which was published from 1907 to 1998. In 1998, the publication was folded into the new National Post. The name Financial Post also lives on in the Post's monthly business magazine, Financial Post Business.

== History and overview ==
The Financial Post started publication in 1907 by John Bayne Maclean. It was a weekly publication, and one of the core assets of Maclean's media business, which eventually became Maclean-Hunter.

The paper was purchased by Sun Media in 1987, and expanded into a daily tabloid on February 1, 1988, and added newspaper home delivery in 1990, with a reformatted Financial Post Magazine following shortly after. In 1998, Sun Media sold the Financial Post to Hollinger, whose CEO Conrad Black had been seeking a way to establish a national newspaper. Sun Media acquired the Kitchener-Waterloo Record, the Guelph Mercury, the Hamilton Spectator and the Cambridge Reporter from Hollinger in exchange, but has since sold all four papers.

The Hollinger transaction was finalized in July 1998. Originally slated to launch on October 5, 1998, the National Post's launch was delayed until October 27 by the financial complications of the Financial Post purchase.

The Financial Post retains a loyal audience of English business readers in Canada, offering coverage similar to the Report on Business by The Globe and Mail. Though there has been frequent speculation that the Financial Post would be merged into the business sections of the regional newspapers owned by the National Post's parent, Postmedia News, much of the Post's editorial content is now syndicated to other Postmedia newspapers through the Postmedia News Service. The Financial Post publishes several popular editorial features throughout the year, including the annual competition Financial Post's Ten Best Companies to Work For.

Editors of the paper included Floyd Chalmers, John Godfrey and Diane Francis, who was the paper's last editor prior to the launch of the National Post.
