= John Bayne Maclean =

Canadian publisher

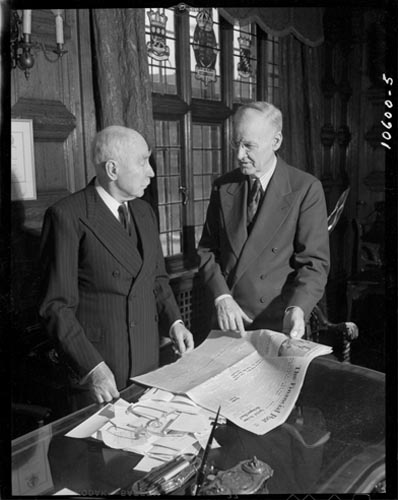
- Lt.Col. J.B. Maclean (left) and Horace Hunter with a copy of The Financial Post, 1947
- Born: September 26, 1862; Crieff, Canada West
- Died: September 25, 1950 (aged 87); Toronto, Ontario, Canada
- Education: Toronto Normal School
- Occupation: publisher

Lieutenant Colonel John Bayne Maclean (26 September 1862 – 25 September 1950) was a Canadian publisher. He founded Maclean's Magazine, the Financial Post and the Maclean Publishing Company, later known as Maclean-Hunter.

== Life and career ==
Maclean was born in Crieff, Canada West (bordering south end of Guelph), to Scottish-born parents, Catherine (Cameron) and Andrew MacLean. Maclean's father was a Presbyterian minister in Puslinch Township. Maclean moved to Chatsworth, Ontario, and graduated as a teacher from Toronto Normal School.

After a brief teaching career, Maclean worked at The Toronto World as reporter and then worked his way to becoming a financial editor of the Toronto Mail before entering publishing with his brother Hugh Cameron Maclean by founding Canadian Grocer & Storekeeper's Newspaper in 1887. He then added a number of trade magazines: Hardware and Metal (1888 ), Dry Goods Review, and Printer and Publisher. In 1905 he founded The Business Magazine which became The Busy Man's Magazine before changing its name to Maclean's Magazine in 1911. He founded the Financial Post in 1907, the Farmer's Magazine in 1910, Mayfair in 1927 and Chatelaine in 1928 building Canada's largest magazine empire. His military rank was earned through service with the Canadian militia, in which he was commanding officer of Montreal's The Duke of York's Royal Canadian Hussars from 1898 to 1903.

His longtime collaborator and associate, Horace Talmadge Hunter, succeeded Maclean as company president upon the founder's retirement. In 1945, the company was renamed Maclean-Hunter.

Maclean died in Toronto in 1950.
