= CKTO-FM =

Radio station in Truro, Nova Scotia

Coordinates: 45°33′16″N 63°13′23″W

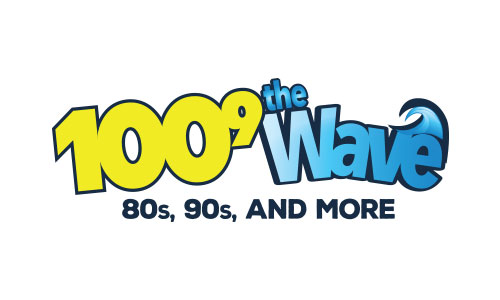
- Truro, Nova Scotia; Canada
- Broadcast area: North Shore
- Frequency: 100.9 MHz
- Branding: 100.9 The Wave

Programming
- Format: Classic hits

Ownership
- Owner: Maritime Broadcasting System
- Sister stations: CKTY-FM

History
- First air date: March 1965
- Former call signs: CKCL-FM
- Call sign meaning: TO for Truro

Technical information
- Class: C1
- ERP: 50 kW horizontal polarization only
- HAAT: 240 metres (790 ft)

Links
- Webcast: Listen Live
- Website: thewavetruro.com

CKTO-FM is a Canadian radio station, broadcasting at 100.9 FM in Truro, Nova Scotia. The station airs a classic hits format and is branded as 100.9 The Wave. The station has been on the air since 1965.

The station is owned by the Maritime Broadcasting System, which also owns sister station CKTY-FM.

== History ==
The station first began broadcasting in March 1965 originally as CKCL-FM before adopting its current call letters. The station's original call letters were later used on a Chilliwack, British Columbia radio station serving the Greater Vancouver area. The station was a CBC Radio affiliate until February 4, 1982. The station was owned and operated by Radio Atlantic Ltd before it was purchased by Telemedia in 1999 and by Astral Media in 2002 and then Bell Media in 2013. CKTO was originally known as Mix 100.9 FM (or 100.9 The Mix) with a hybrid adult contemporary/hot adult contemporary format before it adopted the EZ Rock branding in 2001 and became known as EZ Rock 100.9 FM with an adult contemporary format. In 2002, the station rebranded to "Big Dog 100.9" with a rock-leaning Hot AC format. It was one of several Hot AC stations in Canada that leaned towards rock music. In 2018, the station shifted to full-time rock while keeping the "Big Dog" branding.

As part of a mass format reorganization by Bell Media, on May 18, 2021, CKTO flipped to adult hits, and adopted the Bounce branding.

On February 8, 2024, Bell announced a restructuring that included the sale of 45 of its 103 radio stations to seven buyers, subject to approval by the CRTC, including CKTO, which is to be sold to the Maritime Broadcasting System. The CRTC approved the sale on December 20, 2024.

On April 8, 2025, CKTO rebranded as 100.9 The Wave with a classic hits format.

Every weekend, CKTO plays vintage American Top 40 countdown shows hosted by Casey Kasem, one from the 1980s every Saturday morning, and one from the 1970s every Sunday morning. Sister stations CKPE-FM in Sydney, CHNS-FM in Halifax, Nova Scotia, CFQM-FM in Moncton, CIKX-FM in Grand Falls, New Brunswick, CJCJ-FM in Woodstock, New Brunswick, CKBC-FM in Bathurst, New Brunswick and CJYC-FM in Saint John also do this.

== Former logos ==
EZ Rock 100.9 FM 2001 - 2002

100.9 Big Dog 2002 - 2021

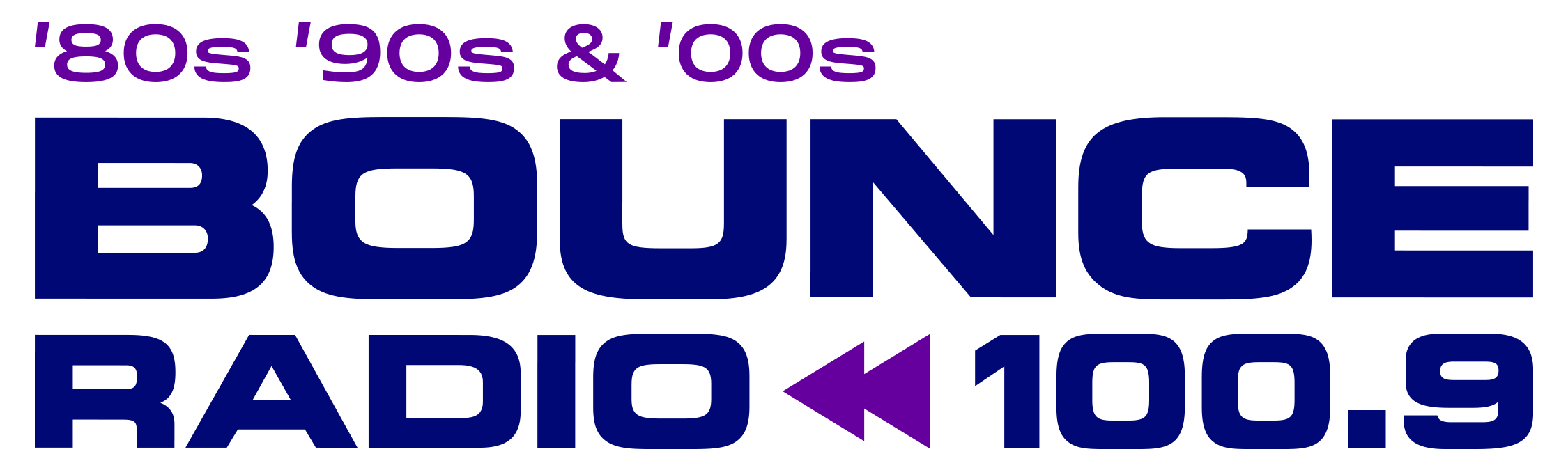
Bounce Radio 100.9 2021 - 2025
