= CJXL-FM =

Radio station in Moncton, New Brunswick

Coordinates: 45°50′55″N 64°47′15″W

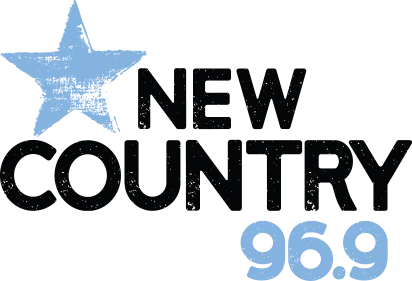
- Moncton, New Brunswick; Canada
- Broadcast area: Greater Moncton
- Frequency: 96.9 MHz
- Branding: New Country 96.9

Programming
- Format: Country

Ownership
- Owner: Stingray Group
- Sister stations: CJMO-FM

History
- First air date: November 2001

Technical information
- Class: C1
- ERP: 100,000 watts
- HAAT: 254 metres (833 ft)

Links
- Website: newcountry969.ca

CJXL-FM is a Canadian radio station broadcasting at 96.9 FM in Moncton, New Brunswick serving the Greater Moncton area. The station currently broadcasts a country format branded on-air as New Country 96.9 and is owned by the Stingray Group.

== History ==
The station first went on the air in November 2001 originally as XL 96 FM with a country format, this was the first time since 1998 that the country format was being heard on FM in the Greater Moncton area. On February 1, 2017, the station changed its branding to New Country 96.9 but maintained the same format.

== Schedule ==
Current on air schedule includes The Scotty & Tony Show (Scotty Horsman, Tony Smith, formerly at CFQM-FM) mornings, Paul Thomas in mid-days, Shilo Bellis afternoons, with additional support from "Handsome" Paul Thomas, Doug Something, Adam McLaren (formerly at CKCW-FM), along with Canadian syndicated programming from Casey Clarke, and Paul McGuire.

== Former logo ==
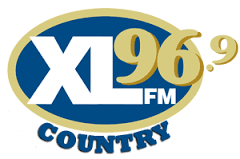
Former logo used from 2001-2007

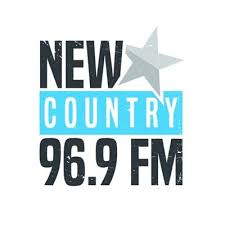
Former logo used from 2017-2024
