= CHER-FM =

Radio station in Sydney, Nova Scotia

Coordinates: 46°10′48″N 60°11′33″W

- Sydney, Nova Scotia; Canada
- Broadcast area: Cape Breton Island
- Frequency: 98.3 MHz
- Branding: Max 98.3

Programming
- Format: Classic rock
- Affiliations: United Stations Radio Networks

Ownership
- Owner: Maritime Broadcasting System
- Sister stations: CJCB, CKPE-FM

History
- First air date: December 1965
- Former frequencies: 950 kHz (AM) (1965–2007)
- Call sign meaning: from a French word meaning "dear"

Technical information
- Class: C1
- ERP: 100,000 watts
- HAAT: 51 metres (167 ft)

Links
- Webcast: Listen live
- Website: max983.ca

CHER-FM is a Canadian radio station broadcasting from Sydney, Nova Scotia, at 98.3 FM. The station broadcasts a classic rock format branded as Max 98.3, although some current rock songs can be played on this station. The station is owned and operated by the Maritime Broadcasting System.

The station hit the airwaves in December 1965, broadcasting at 950 AM until June 11, 2007 when it officially switched to 98.3 FM. On August 11, 2006, the station received CRTC approval to convert to the FM dial which officially occurred at 10:00 a.m. on June 11, 2007; the final song played before the official switchover was "The Long and Winding Road" by The Beatles. The FM signal had a brief testing period before the switch, playing a wide variety of rock, pop and oldies songs. The owners of the station had received numerous complaints for poor signal quality on AM 950 prior to applying for the FM license.

CHER was an oldies station from 1995 to 2005 when it changed its format to classic hits. Before 1995, it was an adult contemporary station. CHER applied for an FM license in 1995, but the application was denied. In 2010, the station's format was changed to its current classic rock format.

CJCB and CKPE-FM are its sister stations.

Former logo
