= CIMS-FM =

Radio station in Balmoral–Campbellton, New Brunswick

Coordinates: 48°04′14″N 66°41′45″W

- Balmoral, New Brunswick; Canada
- Frequency: 103.9 MHz
- Branding: Sommet FM

Programming
- Language: French

Ownership
- Owner: Coopérative Radio Restigouche Ltée

History
- First air date: September 19, 1994

Technical information
- Class: B
- ERP: vertical polarization only: 7.295 kWs average 15 kWs peak
- HAAT: 202 metres (663 ft)
- Repeater: CIMS-FM-1 96.7 Dalhousie

Links
- Website: cimsfm.com

CIMS-FM (Sommet FM) is a Canadian French-language community radio station operating at 103.9 MHz/FM, located in Balmoral, New Brunswick. According to the Canadian Radio-television and Telecommunications Commission (CRTC), the station's city of licence is Balmoral, but the Industry Canada database lists the station as being based in Campbellton.

== History ==
CIMS-FM goes back to 1991 when Coopérative Radio Restigouche Ltée received CRTC approval to operate a special FM licence undertaking Dalhousie at 99.9 MHz from June 27–30, 1991.

On August 12, 1993, Coopérative Radio Restigouche Ltée received CRTC approval to operate a new French-language FM radio station at 103.9 MHz in Balmoral. CIMS-FM began broadcasting on September 19, 1994. In 1997, CIMS-FM received approval from the CRTC to operate a new low-power FM transmitter at 96.7 MHz in Dalhousie.

The station operates under a community radio licence and is owned by a non-profit group known as "La Coopérative Radio Restigouche". It broadcasts on 103.9 MHz using a directional antenna with an average effective radiated power of 7,295 watts and a peak effective radiated power of 15,000 watts (class B).

CIMS-FM also operates a rebroadcaster in Dalhousie, namely CIMS-FM-1, which broadcasts on 96.7 MHz with an effective radiated power of 8 watts (class LP) using an omnidirectional antenna.

The station is a member of the Alliance des radios communautaires du Canada.

CIMS Former Logo

CIMS Previous Logo
