= CIKX-FM =

Radio station in Grand Falls, New Brunswick

Coordinates: 47°05′14″N 67°45′30″W

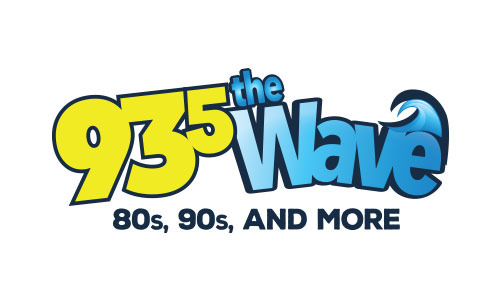
- Grand Falls, New Brunswick; Canada
- Broadcast area: Grand Falls area
- Frequency: 93.5 MHz
- Branding: 93.5 The Wave

Programming
- Format: Classic hits

Ownership
- Owner: Maritime Broadcasting System

History
- First air date: July 8, 1998

Technical information
- Class: A
- ERP: 5,300 watts vertical polarization only
- HAAT: 60.7 metres (199 ft)

Links
- Webcast: Listen Live
- Website: thewavegrandfalls.com

CIKX-FM is a Canadian radio station broadcasting in Grand Falls, New Brunswick at 93.5 MHz and 5,300 watts. CIKX was originally a repeater of CJCJ in Woodstock until the 2000s, when the station opened its studios.

In April 2000, CIKX began airing programming separate from CJCJ. Studios and offices are located at 399 Broadway Boulevard in Grand Falls. On June 7, 2000, Telemedia Radio Atlantic Ltd. received CRTC approval to add a transmitter for CIKX-FM at Plaster Rock using the facilities of the CJCJ rebroadcasting transmitter, CJCJ-2. As a result of the change, the CJCJ rebroadcasters CJCJ-1 and CJCJ-2 were deleted.

Undated, CIKX-FM became K93 with the Today's Best Music slogan.

On April 12, 2007, Astral Media Radio Atlantic Inc. received approval to operate a transmitter for CIKX at Plaster Rock (CIKX-FM-1) operating on 91.7 MHz with an effective radiated power of 50 watts. The new transmitter would replace the existing AM transmitter at that location. The AM transmitter was inefficient, worn-out and difficult to maintain. The AM transmitter site was in a low-lying area. The new FM transmitter would be located in an area with an elevation for line-of-sight coverage.

On February 4, 2008, Astral Media Radio Atlantic Inc. received approval to change the frequency of CIKX-FM-1 to 88.3 MHz.

As part of a mass format reorganization by Bell Media, on May 18, 2021, CIKX-FM dropped the longtime K93 branding and flipped to adult hits, and adopted the Bounce branding.

On February 8, 2024, Bell announced a restructuring that included the sale of 45 of its 103 radio stations to seven buyers, subject to approval by the CRTC, including CIKX, which is to be sold to the Maritime Broadcasting System. The CRTC approved the sale on December 20, 2024. On April 8, 2025, the station rebranded to "93.5 The Wave".

Every weekend, CIKX plays vintage American Top 40 countdown shows hosted by Casey Kasem, one from the 1980s every Saturday morning, and one from the 1970s every Sunday morning. Sister stations CHNS-FM in Halifax, Nova Scotia, CKPE-FM in Sydney, CKTO-FM in Truro, Nova Scotia, CFQM-FM in Moncton, CJCJ-FM in Woodstock, New Brunswick, CKBC-FM in Bathurst, New Brunswick and CJYC-FM in Saint John also do this.

== Rebroadcasters ==
- CIKX-FM-1 88.3 FM - Tobique Valley

== Former logos ==
K93
Unknown year - 2021

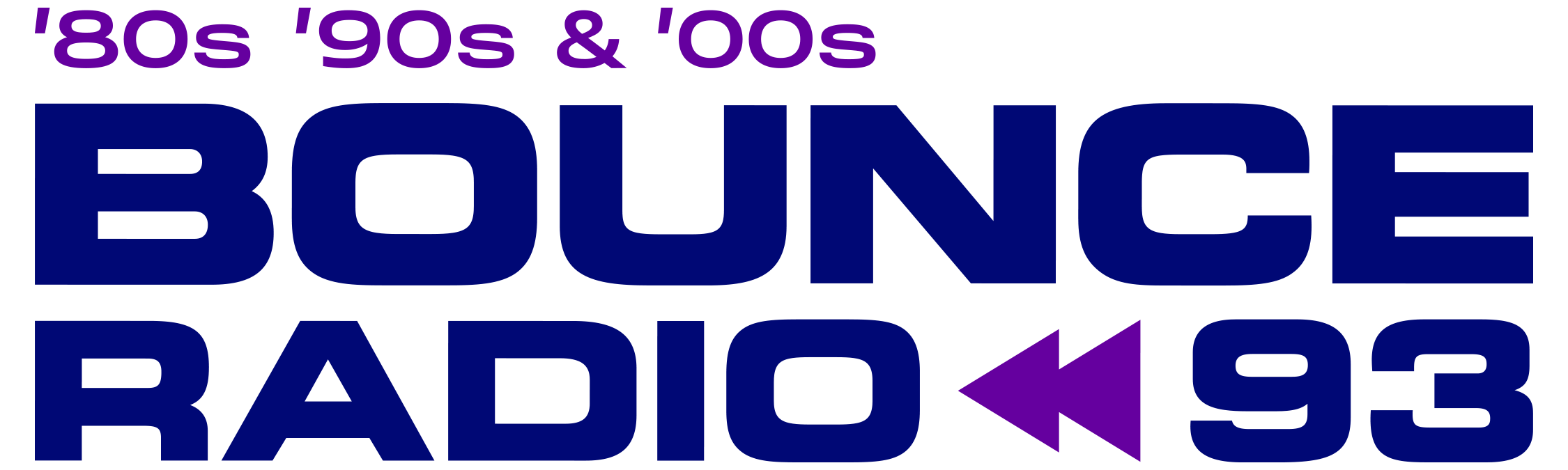
Bounce Radio 93
2021 - 2025
