= CJYC-FM =

Radio station in Saint John, New Brunswick

Coordinates: 45°16′30.7″N 66°3′28.1″W

- Saint John, New Brunswick; Canada
- Frequency: 98.9 MHz
- Branding: Kool 98

Programming
- Format: Classic hits

Ownership
- Owner: Maritime Broadcasting System
- Sister stations: CFBC, CIOK-FM

History
- First air date: March 12, 1965
- Former call signs: CFBC-FM (1965–1980s)

Technical information
- Class: C1
- ERP: 12 kW
- HAAT: 385.5 metres (1,265 ft)

Links
- Webcast: Listen Live
- Website: kool98.fm

CJYC-FM is a Canadian radio station broadcasting from Saint John, New Brunswick at 98.9 FM with a classic hits format branded on-air as Kool 98. The station is owned by the Maritime Broadcasting System.

== History ==
The station began broadcasting in 1965 as CFBC-FM, the first FM radio station in New Brunswick. CFBC-FM was a companion to CFBC AM. In the early 1980s, CFBC-FM adopted its current callsign. On April 10, 1992, the CRTC denied an application by Fundy II Ltd. to change CJYC's frequency from 98.9 MHz to 94.1 MHz and to change the effective radiated power from 50,000 to 100,000 watts. MBS purchased CFBC and CJYC in 1997 from Fundy Communications. On February 7, 2000, CJYC received CRTC approval to decrease the effective radiated power from 50,000 to 12,000 watts.

For several years, CJYC and, sister station, CFBC's studios were on Carleton Street in Uptown Saint John. In the mid-1990s, CJYC and CFBC moved their studios and offices to 199 Chesley Drive. In 1997, CJYC and CFBC moved into MBS's studios and offices on Union Street, where they are as of August 2016.

Unionized staff at CJYC and two other MBS stations in Saint John went on strike in June 2012, which lasted close to two years. In May 2014, a deal was signed seeing staff return to work.

The station was originally known as C98 with a classic rock format. In August 2006, the station rebranded to 98.9 Big John FM while maintaining the same format. The station's classic rock format eventually evolved into mainstream rock. In August 2013, the station changed its format to classic hits and rebranded to Kool 98.

Every weekend, CJYC plays vintage American Top 40 countdown shows hosted by Casey Kasem, one from the 1980s every Saturday morning, and one from the 1970s every Sunday morning. Sister stations CHNS-FM in Halifax, Nova Scotia, CKPE-FM in Sydney, CKTO-FM in Truro, Nova Scotia, CFQM-FM in Moncton, CIKX-FM in Grand Falls, New Brunswick, CJCJ-FM in Woodstock, New Brunswick, and CKBC-FM in Bathurst, New Brunswick also do this.
