= CJRI-FM =

Radio station in Fredericton, New Brunswick

Coordinates: 45°56′14″N 66°39′19″W

- Fredericton, New Brunswick; Canada
- Broadcast area: Greater Fredericton; Woodstock; St. Stephen; Upper Miramichi
- Frequencies: Previously licensed at 104.5 MHz (FM)
- Branding: CJRI

Programming
- Format: Christian

Ownership
- Owner: Ross Ingram and Paul Dixon; (Faithway Communications)

History
- First air date: May 18, 2005
- Former frequencies: 94.7 MHz (2005–2008)
- Call sign meaning: Ross Ingram, owner

Technical information
- Class: LP
- Power: 50 watts
- HAAT: 32 metres (105 ft)

Links
- Website: https://www.cjri.fm/

CJRI-FM is a Canadian internet radio station based in Fredericton, New Brunswick, previously licensed to broadcast over-the-air on 104.5 MHz. The station broadcasts a Christian format and is owned by long-time local broadcaster Ross Ingram, who also hosts the morning show. The station airs a mix of music, including Southern gospel and Praise music, as well as talk and teaching programs from religious leaders such as David Jeremiah and Dr. Charles Stanley. CJRI-FM was also licensed to operate several rebroadcasters around New Brunswick.

In August 2023, the CRTC denied CJRI's license renewal application due to the "severity of numerous instances of non-compliance, the station’s history and the licensee’s failure to respond to the commission, including failing to appear at a May public hearing" and ordered that it cease broadcasting by August 31, 2023. As of September 1, 2023, the CJRI website made no mention of a shutdown and its online stream was continuing to broadcast live programming.

== History ==
The station has been on the air since May 18, 2005, originally on 94.7 FM.

Due to interference from WBCQ-FM, a radio station which launched in Monticello, Maine, in September 2008, CJRI-FM applied to the Canadian Radio-Television and Telecommunications Commission for a frequency change to 104.5. This application was approved on November 27, 2008.

== Rebroadcasters ==
On December 1, 2008, the CRTC approved an application by Faithway Communications Inc. to operate new FM transmitters at Woodstock, New Bandon and Saint Stephen, New Brunswick.

Rebroadcasters of CJRI-FM
City of licence	Identifier	Frequency	Power	RECNet
Woodstock	CJRI-FM-1	101.1 FM	50 watts	Query
St. Stephen	CJRI-FM-2	99.9 FM	50 watts	Query
New Bandon	CJRI-FM-3	99.7 FM	50 watts	Query
