= CIOK-FM =

Radio station in Saint John, New Brunswick

- Saint John, New Brunswick; Canada
- Frequency: 100.5 MHz
- Branding: K100

Programming
- Format: Adult contemporary

Ownership
- Owner: Maritime Broadcasting System
- Sister stations: CFBC, CJYC-FM

History
- First air date: 1987
- Call sign meaning: Contains K for K100

Technical information
- Class: C
- ERP: 100,000 watts
- HAAT: 381.5 metres (1,252 ft)

Links
- Webcast: Listen Live
- Website: k100.ca

CIOK-FM (100.5 MHz) is a Canadian radio station in Saint John, New Brunswick, owned by the Maritime Broadcasting System. The station currently offers an adult contemporary format branded on-air as K100. Prior to July 2009, it had an adult contemporary format before changing to CHR/Top 40. As of September 2015, the station moved back to AC.

== Format ==
The format change happened a little after the same time CFQM-FM in Moncton changed from an Adult Contemporary format, to a Classic Hits format in July 2009.

CIOK was being programmed out of Moncton and in order to cut costs, MBS decided that instead of flipping CIOK to a classic hits format they would change the format to a CHR/Top 40 format to more effectively compete with rival CHWV-FM. CIOK-FM's switch to CHR joined sister station CKCW-FM in Moncton, which moved from top 40 to hot AC by that same time. Nielsen BDS later moved the station to the Canadian hot adult contemporary panel after the flip of this station to top 40. In September 2015, the station returned to adult contemporary.

== History ==
Original version of the current logo, created in 2006 when the station was playing a soft rock format.

Original logo, dating back to the 1990s, discontinued use in 2006.

On December 3, 1986, Mervyn Russell, representing a company to be incorporated received approval from the CRTC to operate a new FM radio station at Saint John. The station began broadcasting in 1987 with Gary Crowell as the GM, and Jim Goldrich returned to CIOK from working at CJYQ in St. John's, Newfoundland and Labrador. CIOK's original studios and offices were on 400 Main Street in Place 400. In the mid-1990s, K100 moved their studios and offices to Union Street, where they are still located. In 1997, the station was purchased by Newcap Broadcasting and was re-purchased by MBS Radio in 2005.

CIOK was the long-time radio home of Saint John radio personality Bruce Weaver who hosted CIOK's morning show from 1991 to 2002 and made CIOK #1 in the ratings during that time.

CIOK announcers along with the announcers of two other MBS stations and support staff continue went on strike for a fair deal, which was achieved in 2012.

== Ads ==
Although the station's reports are not on Mediabase, the station's ads were exactly the same as sister hot adult contemporary station CKCW-FM in Moncton; however, Mediabase now lists the station as of March 2011 for adds on the same Canadian hot AC panel as rival CHWV-FM. As of August 2011, MBS's website identifies CIOK-FM, and sister station CKCW-FM's, formats as being top 40 or CHR.
