= CFAI-FM =

Radio station in Edmundston, New Brunswick

Coordinates: 47°23′22″N 68°19′06″W

- Edmundston, New Brunswick; Canada
- Broadcast area: Edmundston area
- Frequency: 101.1 MHz
- Branding: CFAI 101.1 / 105.1

Programming
- Language: French
- Format: Active rock

Ownership
- Owner: La Coopérative des Montagnes Limitée

History
- First air date: April 2, 1991

Technical information
- Class: A
- ERP: 1,000 watts
- HAAT: 149.5 metres (490 ft)

Links
- Webcast: Listen Live
- Website: cfai.fm

CFAI-FM is a Canadian radio station in Edmundston, New Brunswick broadcasting on 101.1 FM. The station plays a French language active rock radio format and is branded as CFAI 101.1 / 105.1. CFAI also has a rebroadcaster in Grand Falls, broadcasting at 105.1 MHz.

== History ==
On August 21, 1990, La Coopérative des Montagnes Ltée received approval from the CRTC to operate a new FM radio station at Edmundston on the frequency of 101.1 MHz and Saint-Quentin, New Brunswick on 90.1 MHz. The station first went on the air on April 2, 1991. The Grand Falls station operating at 105.1 MHz as CFAI-FM-1 received approval on February 15, 1989.

The former CFAI-FM rebroadcaster at 90.1 MHz in Saint-Quentin is now used by a locally produced radio station as CFJU-FM.

The station is a member of the Alliance des radios communautaires du Canada.
