= CJEM-FM =

Radio station in Edmundston, New Brunswick

Coordinates: 47°22′07″N 68°21′21″W

- Edmundston, New Brunswick; Canada
- Broadcast area: Edmundston area
- Frequency: 92.7 MHz
- Branding: Frontiére FM 92

Programming
- Language: French
- Format: Adult contemporary

Ownership
- Owner: Radio Edmundston Inc.

History
- First air date: December 1944
- Former frequencies: 1240 kHz (1944–1945); 1230 kHz (1945–1952); 1380 kHz (1952–1954); 570 kHz (1954–1998)
- Call sign meaning: Edmundston

Technical information
- Class: B
- ERP: 27,165 watts vertical polarization 40,750 watts horizontal polarization
- HAAT: 168.5 metres (553 ft)
- Repeaters: CKMV-FM 95.1 Grand Falls (ERP 975 watts, HAAT 60.7 m)

Links
- Webcast: Listen Live
- Website: www.frontiere.fm/

CJEM-FM is a Canadian radio station in Edmundston, New Brunswick, broadcasting on 92.7 FM with a power of 40,750 watts. The station plays an adult contemporary format. CJEM also has a repeat transmitter, CKMV, located in Grand Falls broadcasting at 95.1 MHz.

The station is owned by Radio Edmundston Inc. and first went on the air in December 1944, thus becoming the first French speaking radio station in Canada outside of the province of Quebec. It was originally carried at 1240 kHz, then at 1230 kHz in 1945, then at 1380 kHz in 1952, 570 kHz in 1954, before given approval to switch to 92.7 MHz in 1998. CJEM's rebroadcaster, CKMV, began broadcasting at 1490 kHz in 1974, and was given approval to switch to 95.1 MHz in 2000.

In 1991, CJEM received approval to add transmitters in Grand Falls (95.1) and Saint-Léonard, New Brunswick (104.3). In 1995, CJEM was authorized to delete transmitters CJEM-FM-1 and CJEM-FM-2.
