= CINB-FM =

Radio station in Saint John, New Brunswick

Coordinates: 45°18′00″N 66°01′52″W

- Saint John, New Brunswick; Canada
- Frequency: 96.1 MHz
- Branding: Oldies96

Programming
- Format: Oldies/classic hits
- Affiliations: Compass Media Networks; Westwood One

Ownership
- Owner: CINB-FM Communications

History
- First air date: Early 2001
- Call sign meaning: Christian In New Brunswick

Technical information
- Class: LP
- ERP: 1,726 watts average 2,500 watts peak
- HAAT: 29.8 metres (98 ft)

Links
- Website: oldies96.com

CINB-FM is a Canadian radio station in Saint John, New Brunswick. Branded as Oldies96, it broadcasts oldies/classic hits of the 1950s, 1960s, and 1970s, local talk, and specialty shows, and is found at 96.1 MHz on the FM dial.

== History ==
On May 10, 2000, Donald E. Mabee, on behalf of a company to be incorporated and to be known as Newsong Communications received Canadian Radio-television and Telecommunications Commission (CRTC) approval to operate a new low-power Christian music FM station at Saint John, New Brunswick. The station began broadcasting in early 2001. Its first program director was Gary Stackhouse, who was instrumental in the launch of the station.

On October 18, 2005, the CRTC approved the application by New Song Communications Ministries Ltd. to effect a corporate reorganization that would result in the applicant acquiring the assets of CINB-FM from New Song Communications Ltd.

On July 26, 2019, the CRTC approved an application by New Song Communications Ministries Ltd. to operate a low-power, English-language community FM radio station in Saint John, New Brunswick on the frequency 96.1 MHz (channel 241A) with an average effective radiated power (ERP) of 1,726 watts (maximum ERP of 2,500 watts with an effective height of the antenna above average terrain of 29.8 metres). The new antenna is relocating to Marr Road in Rothesay, NB to provide a better coverage area.

On Thursday September 28, 2020, Newsong FM Announced via their website and social media, that the Christian format was going to continue online only with long time staff member Terry Hatfield taking over the broadcast. On November 9, 2020, at 6:00 a.m., Oldies96 launched with Donnie in the Morning, and well known broadcasters from the local area. Day one launch included, Don and Matt Mabee, Donnie Robertson, Rick Mantle, Terri Wallace, Trish Hamilton, Bruce Weaver, Andrea Cyr with shows from Kevin Hastings and Bob Henry.
