= CFBC =

Radio station in Saint John, New Brunswick

Coordinates: 45°13′55″N 66°06′12″W

- Saint John, New Brunswick; Canada
- Frequency: 930 kHz
- Branding: 93 CFBC

Programming
- Format: Country music
- Affiliations: CBC Dominion (1946–1962); Saint John Sea Dogs

Ownership
- Owner: Maritime Broadcasting System
- Sister stations: CIOK-FM, CJYC-FM

History
- First air date: November 21, 1946
- Call sign meaning: Fundy Broadcasting Company (original owner)

Technical information
- Class: B
- Power: 2,000 watts day; 150 watts night

Links
- Webcast: Listen Live
- Website: cfbcradio.com

CFBC (930 AM) is a commercial radio station in Saint John, New Brunswick. The station plays a radio format mixing current and recent Country music hits blended with Classic Country. CFBC is owned and operated by the Maritime Broadcasting System. The studios and offices are on Union Street.

CFBC broadcasts with a power output of 2,000 watts by day and 150 watts at night non-directional. The transmitter is off Sand Cove Road in Saint John.

== History ==
CFBC's original logo as an oldies station.

CFBC's first broadcast was on November 21, 1946, and was an affiliate of the CBC Dominion Network until its dissolution in 1962. The call sign comes from the station's original owner, the Fundy Broadcasting Company (later known as Fundy Cable).

In 1965, an FM station was added. CFBC-FM began operating at 98.9 MHz. It is now known as CJYC-FM. MBS purchased CFBC and CJYC from Fundy in 1997.

For several years, the studios and offices for CFBC and sister station CJYC-FM, were on Carleton Street in Uptown Saint John. In the mid-1990s, CFBC and CJYC-FM moved their studios and offices to 199 Chesley Drive. In 1997, CFBC and CJYC-FM moved into MBS's facility on Union Street.

In addition to its music, CFBC is known for its news coverage. A morning talk show, Talk of the Town, was discontinued in 2006.

Unionized staff at CFBC and two other MBS stations in Saint John went on strike in June 2012, triggering calls for a boycott of the station's advertisers. The strikers set up an internet radio station until the strike was settled.

In August 2013, CFBC flipped from oldies/classic hits to country.

CFBC previously broadcast at a 50,000 watts with a directional antenna, using a four-tower array, to protect other stations on AM 930. The ownership applied for and received approval in January 2020 to lower the station's power. The licensee stated the change was required to address system failures, repairs, the ever-increasing costs of operating an AM radio station, and a steady decline in the station's revenues. It now operates at markedly lower power, from a single non-directional antenna.

== Notable alumni ==
CFBC has been home to several notable people in radio and television. They include:

- Bob Lockhart (deceased)
- Clark Todd (deceased)
- Ron Wilson (deceased)
- Steve Murphy
- Donnie Robertson
