= CKTY-FM =

Radio station in Truro, Nova Scotia

Coordinates: 45°33′16″N 63°13′23″W

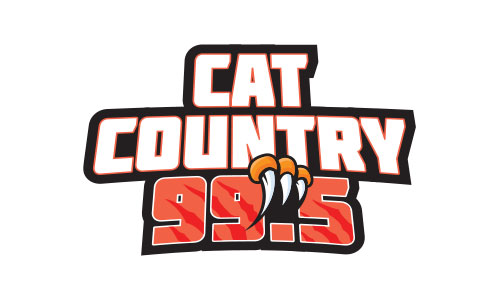
- Truro, Nova Scotia; Canada
- Frequency: 99.5 MHz
- Branding: Cat Country 99.5

Programming
- Format: Country

Ownership
- Owner: Maritime Broadcasting System
- Sister stations: CKTO-FM

History
- First air date: September 10, 1947
- Former call signs: CKCL (1956–2001)
- Former frequencies: 1400 kHz (AM) (1947–1956); 600 kHz (1956–2001)
- Call sign meaning: "Cat Country," alternatively, CKitTY

Technical information
- Class: B
- ERP: 16,750 watts
- HAAT: 226 metres (741 ft)

Links
- Website: catcountry995.com

CKTY-FM (99.5 MHz) is a radio station in Truro, Nova Scotia. Owned by the Maritime Broadcasting System, it broadcasts a country format branded as Cat Country 99.5.

== History ==
The station has been on the air since September 10, 1947. It originally broadcast at 1400 AM as CKCL before moving to 600 AM in 1956; finally, it received CRTC approval to move to 99.5 FM in 2001 after shutting down the 600 AM frequency.

CKTY was formerly the callsign of a now-defunct AM radio station in Sarnia, Ontario, which moved to the FM dial and is now CHKS-FM. CKCL was also a former callsign of a radio station in Toronto, Ontario in the 1920s.

On July 5, 2013, CKTY and sister station CKTO-FM were acquired by Bell Media as part of their acquisition of Astral Media. On May 28, 2019, the station was renamed Pure Country 99.5 as part of a nationwide rebranding of all Bell Media country stations.

On February 8, 2024, Bell announced that it would sell five of its stations in Atlantic Canada to Maritime Broadcasting System, as part of a corporate restructuring. The CRTC approved the sale on December 20, 2024, and the station relaunched its heritage Cat Country branding on April 8, 2025.
