= CKUM-FM =

Radio station in Moncton, New Brunswick

Coordinates: 46°06′16″N 64°46′54″W

CKUM
- Moncton, New Brunswick; Canada
- Broadcast area: Greater Moncton
- Frequency: 93.5 MHz
- Branding: Codiac 93.5 FM

Programming
- Language: French
- Format: Campus radio and community radio

Ownership
- Owner: Les Médias acadiens universitaires, inc.

History
- Founded: 1971
- First air date: 1981
- Former frequencies: 105.7 MHz (1981–1995)
- Call sign meaning: Université de Moncton

Technical information
- Class: A1
- ERP: 250 watts horizontal polarization only
- HAAT: −5 metres (−16 ft)

Links
- Website: codiacfm.ca

CKUM 93.5 FM is a radio station broadcasting at 93.5 MHz in Moncton, New Brunswick, Canada. It is the campus radio station of the Université de Moncton. When launched as an FM station, CKUM was originally carried at 105.7 MHz before moving to its present frequency of 93.5 MHz.

== History ==
In 1971, The University of Moncton launched CKUM Radio as a closed circuit, mono network that was hard-wired throughout the campus and could be tuned in by means of a speaker in rooms throughout the various building on the campus.

In 1981, Les Média Acadiens Universitaires Inc. received an FM licence for a new station at the University of Moncton. CKUM would operate on a frequency of 105.7 MHz and have a power of 50 watts. On March 25, 1994, CKUM-FM's application to change frequencies from 105.7 MHz to 94.5 MHz and to increase the effective radiated power from 50 watts to 13,300 watts was denied. The station reapplied a year later to change frequencies from 105.7 MHz to 93.5 MHz at 250 watts and received Canadian Radio-television and Telecommunications Commission (CRTC) approval on September 21, 1995.

The station is a member of the Alliance des radios communautaires du Canada.

== CKUM "2.0" (1992) ==
In 1992, CKUM moved from its original home in the Massey House at 195 Massey Avenue to its current home in the University of Moncton Student Centre where specialized studios were designed built to create a then, fully modern radio setup.

== The Facility ==
CKUM features a 4 studio station consisting of two identical hybrid control rooms and two sound studios. Each control room (Studios A & C) were designed in a manner that they can be used as control rooms for their adjacent sound studios or function independently as a full studio for hosting of programming. Each hybrid control room features a full 12 channel broadcast board as well as 3 microphones.

Each hybrid control room also features an adjacent sound booth that is visible through angled windows from the main control board. Studio B, which is the smaller of the studios features a 5-seat table with full microphone and headphone wiring integrated into the furniture and is used for interviews and also as a live news booth. Studio D is a larger studio with full connectivity to its adjacent control room and is used for live performances on the radio and also functions as a recording studio for the production of music.

Each studio is built with 5 or 6 non-adjacent walls lined with sound absorption paneling as well as 1 foot thick floors and ceilings that are also fully sound insulted.

== CKUM 3.0 ==
On the 20th Anniversary of CKUM moving into its current home in the Student Centre, the summer of 2012 marked a new beginning for the collapsing radio stations. CKUM began the processes of modernizing its facilities through a complete revamp of the entire facility. The entire station was painted for the first time since its construction in 1992 using bright colours, the primary on air studio (Studio A) was stripped completely of its aging analog equipment and was completely redone with new furniture and new digital equipment with Studio C scheduled for 2013, making CKUM one of the most advanced facilities in the Moncton area with only stations such as those owned by CBC or Rogers ahead.

With these advancements CKUM has moved to the online realm with online web streaming at full 320K MP3 encoded streaming and a fully interactive website that was launched in the fall of 2012.
