= CFBO-FM =

Radio station in Moncton, New Brunswick, Canada

Coordinates: 46°11′04″N 64°52′52″W

- Moncton, New Brunswick; Canada
- Broadcast area: Greater Moncton
- Frequency: 90.7 MHz
- Branding: Plus 90.7

Programming
- Language: French
- Format: hot adult contemporary/community radio

Ownership
- Owner: Radio Beauséjour

History
- First air date: 2004

Technical information
- Class: B
- ERP: 30,000 watts
- HAAT: 149 metres (489 ft)

Links
- Website: plus90.ca

CFBO-FM (90.7 MHz) is a French-language Canadian radio station broadcasting in Moncton, New Brunswick. The station airs a hot adult contemporary/community radio format branded as Plus 90.7. Its studios are located at the Arts and Cultural centre in Dieppe.

Owned by Radio Beauséjour Inc., the station was licensed in 2004. However, an article in the October 6, 2008 edition of the Northeast Radio Watch (NERW) stated that there was a new signal in Moncton operating at 90.7 FM, known as BO-FM 90.7 with a French adult contemporary format.

The call sign CFBO was first used from 1928 to 1934 for a Saint John radio station. After a change of ownership in 1934, the callsign changed to CHSJ and was heard at the 1120 kHz frequency. In 1945, the frequency moved to 1150 kHz. The original frequency of AM 890 would eventually move to 1210 kHz in 1933 and then 1120 kHz in 1934.

CFBO-FM as "BO-FM" from 2008 until October 2021

In September 2021, the station switched to hot adult contemporary and changed its branding to Plus 90.7.

The station is a member of the Alliance des radios communautaires du Canada.
