= CKDH-FM =

Radio station in Amherst, Nova Scotia

Coordinates: 45°49′04″N 64°13′57″W

- Amherst, Nova Scotia; Canada
- Frequency: 101.7 MHz
- Branding: 101.7 CKDH

Programming
- Language: English
- Format: Country

Ownership
- Owner: Maritime Broadcasting System

History
- First air date: October 25, 1957
- Former frequencies: 1400 kHz (AM) (1957–1965); 900 kHz (1965–2011)

Technical information
- Class: B
- ERP: 23,000 watts average 50,000 watts peak vertical polarization only
- HAAT: 16 metres (52 ft)

Links
- Webcast: Listen Live
- Website: ckdh.net

CKDH-FM is a Canadian radio station broadcasting at 101.7 FM in Amherst, Nova Scotia, owned by the Maritime Broadcasting System, and currently offers a country format.

Prior to August 2011, the station was broadcast at 900 AM before moving to 101.7 FM.

== History ==
Originally owned by Amherst Broadcasting Co., the station began broadcasting in 1957 at 1400 AM, before moving to 900 AM in 1965 and to 101.7 FM as of 2011. Over the years, CKDH has gone through different ownerships and formats.

CKDH received CRTC approval on April 24, 2009. to move from 900 AM to 101.7 FM, which took effect on July 21, 2011.

A radio station repeater, CJSE-FM-1 out of Memramcook received CRTC approval to move from 101.7 MHz to another FM frequency on April 13, 2010 to prevent co-channel interference with CKDH after its move to FM. On June 17, 2011, Maritime Broadcasting System received approval from the CRTC to increase CKDH-FM's average ERP from 18,700 to 23,000 watts, by decreasing the effective height of antenna above average terrain from 32 to 16 meters and by relocating its transmitter.

== FM launch ==
On July 21, 2011, CKDH began testing at 101.7 FM. On August 12, 2011 at 9:00 a.m., CKDH officially flipped to FM. The AM 900 signal which simulcasted the programs from 101.7 FM was shut down by the end of 2011. The new FM station continued to air its existing adult contemporary format.

On August 12, 2011, the station officially launched as 101.7 CKDH with the first song being Pink's "Get the Party Started", following the transition to FM, the station continued to air an AC format.

On November 17, 2011, the plug was pulled on the AM 900 signal in Amherst after the 90-day authorized simulcast period expired for their flip to 101.7 FM. Programming will continue on the new 101.7 FM.

In August 2013, CKDH changed its format to country; it kept the same branding.

== 48 Hours for Haiti ==
Moved by the devastation in Haiti following the 2010 earthquake, host Dave March made a pledge to go on the air for 48 hours straight to raise money for the Red Cross and their efforts in Haiti. March stayed on the air for almost 50 hours, raising more than $20,000 for the Canadian Red Cross.

== Notable personalities ==
- Ian Hanomansing
- Mike Duffy
