= CHFX-FM =

Radio station in Halifax, Nova Scotia

Coordinates: 44°39′03″N 63°39′25″W

- Halifax, Nova Scotia; Canada
- Broadcast area: Halifax Regional Municipality
- Frequency: 101.9 MHz
- Branding: FX101.9

Programming
- Format: Country

Ownership
- Owner: Maritime Broadcasting System
- Sister stations: CHNS-FM

History
- First air date: November 1947
- Call sign meaning: "Halifax"

Technical information
- Class: C
- ERP: 91,000 watts horizontal polarization only
- HAAT: 230.5 metres (756 ft)

Links
- Website: fx1019.ca

CHFX-FM is a Canadian radio station broadcasting at 101.9 FM in Halifax, Nova Scotia. The station currently plays a country format branded on-air as FX101.9. CHFX's studios are located at 90 Lovett Lake Court, while its transmitter is located on Washmill Lake Drive in Clayton Park. The station is owned and operated by the Maritime Broadcasting System, which also owns sister station CHNS-FM.

The station has been on the air since November 1947, beginning as an FM simulcast of its sister station CHNS when it was an AM station. It gained its current callsign CHFX and switched to country music at the beginning of the 1970s. It was originally known as Country 101 CHFX until the 90s when it became Hot Country 101.9 CHFX. In the early 2000s, It became simply Country 101 before adopting its current branding around late 2005.

== Current hosts ==
- Frankie Hollywood & MJ (FX Mornings)
- Country Top 40 with Fitz
