= CHOY-FM =

Radio station in Moncton, New Brunswick

Coordinates: 46°08′41″N 64°54′11″W

- Moncton, New Brunswick; Canada
- Broadcast area: Greater Moncton
- Frequency: 99.9 MHz
- Branding: Choix FM 99,9

Programming
- Language: French
- Format: Country

Ownership
- Owner: Maritime Broadcasting System
- Sister stations: CKCW-FM, CFQM-FM

History
- First air date: 2001
- Call sign meaning: derived from choix, "choice" in French

Technical information
- Class: B
- ERP: 9.5 kWs
- HAAT: 178.7 metres (586 ft)

Links
- Website: choix999.com

CHOY-FM (Choix FM 99,9) is a French-language radio station broadcasting at 99.9 MHz from Moncton, New Brunswick, Canada. The station currently plays a country format with the slogan "L'Acadie country" and is owned by the Maritime Broadcasting System with its studios at 1000 St George Boulevard. Preceding CHOY, the only private francophone broadcaster in Moncton had been CHLR, which began broadcasting October 31, 1981 until January 2, 1985.

== History ==
On August 24, 2000, Denis Losier, on behalf of a company to be incorporated received approval by the Canadian Radio-television and Telecommunications Commission (CRTC) to operate a new commercial French-language FM radio service in Moncton. The station began broadcasting with an adult contemporary format in 2001. On February 21, 2006, the station received approval to transfer the effective control of CHOY-FM Limitée, licensee of CHOY-FM Moncton, New Brunswick, from Radio Diffusion Acadie Inc. to Maritime Broadcasting System Limited (MBS).
