= CJSE-FM =

Radio station in Shediac, New Brunswick

Coordinates: 46°11′04″N 64°52′52″W

- Shediac, New Brunswick; Canada
- Frequency: 89.5 MHz
- Branding: CJSE Country 89

Programming
- Language: French
- Format: Country

Ownership
- Owner: Radio Beauséjour Inc.

Technical information
- Class: B
- ERP: vertical polarization only: 20.445 kW average 38 kW peak
- HAAT: 152 metres (499 ft)

Links
- Website: cjse.ca

CJSE-FM is a French language country music radio station in Shediac, New Brunswick, Canada and is licensed to Moncton, New Brunswick, CJSE is owned by Radio Beauséjour Inc.

Owned by Radio Beauséjour Inc., the station received CRTC approval in 1993.

Morning drive host John Richard (JR) has been with CJSE since the latter 1990s. JR, educated and raised in the region, is a pioneer of the Moncton radio market having worked since the mid-1970s. He is a veteran of CKCW (AM), CFQM-FM and the defunct CFNB (AM), respectively.

The station is a member of the Alliance des radios communautaires du Canada.

== Repeaters ==
Rebroadcasters of CJSE-FM
City of licence	Identifier	Frequency	RECNet	CRTC Decision
Memramcook, New Brunswick	CJSE-FM-1	92.5 FM	Query	2002-146 2010-212
Baie-Sainte-Anne, New Brunswick	CJSE-FM-2	107.5 FM	Query	2004-286

On February 18, 2010, CJSE applied to the CRTC to change Memramcook's repeater frequency from 101.7 to 92.5 FM and received approval on April 13, 2010. This would prevent interference with CKDH-FM's move from the AM band to 101.7 MHz on the FM band in Amherst, Nova Scotia.
