= CFAN-FM =

Radio station in Miramichi, New Brunswick

Coordinates: 47°03′32″N 65°40′05″W

- Miramichi, New Brunswick; Canada
- Broadcast area: Miramichi Valley
- Frequency: 99.3 MHz
- Branding: 99.3 The River

Programming
- Format: Country

Ownership
- Owner: Maritime Broadcasting System

History
- First air date: April 4, 1949
- Former call signs: CKMR (1949–1973)
- Former frequencies: 1340 kHz (AM) (1949–1956); 790 kHz (1956–2003)

Technical information
- Class: B
- ERP: horizontal polarization only: 17.8 kW
- HAAT: 103.5 metres (340 ft)

Links
- Website: 993theriver.com

CFAN-FM is a Canadian radio station broadcasting at 99.3 FM in Miramichi, New Brunswick, owned by the Maritime Broadcasting System. The station uses its on-air brand name as 99.3 The River with a country format.

== History ==
CFAN originally began as CKMR on April 4, 1949 at 1340 AM. It moved to 790 in 1956. In 1973, CKMR's callsign had changed to CFAN. On July 2, 2002, CFAN was given approval by CRTC to switch to the FM band. On January 10, 2003, CFAN officially launched as an FM station at 99.3 MHz branded as 99.3 The River. On September 7, 2012 at 6 p.m., CFAN-FM changed its format from adult contemporary to country. The station's branding remained the same but the station's slogan was changed to "Today's Best Country".
