= CBAL-FM =

Ici Musique station in New Brunswick, Canada

- Moncton, New Brunswick; Canada
- Frequency: 98.3 MHz
- Branding: Ici Musique

Programming
- Format: Public Music

Ownership
- Owner: Canadian Broadcasting Corporation

History
- First air date: April 15, 1983
- Former call signs: CBAF-FM (1983–1989)
- Call sign meaning: Canadian Broadcasting Corporation Atlantic L

Technical information
- Class: C
- ERP: vertical polarization: 31.7 kWs horizontal polarization: 67.6 kW
- HAAT: 211 metres (692 ft)

Links
- Website: ICI Musique

CBAL-FM is a Canadian radio station, which broadcasts SRC's Ici Musique network on 98.3 FM in Moncton, New Brunswick.

The station went on the air as CBAF-FM on April 15, 1983. For a long time, it was the only station in Radio-Canada's FM service that did not serve any portion of Quebec. It adopted its current call sign in 1989 after Radio-Canada AM outlet CBAF moved to the FM band and picked up the CBAF-FM call letters.

== Rebroadcasters ==
Rebroadcasters of CBAL-FM
City of licence	Identifier	Frequency	Power	Class	RECNet	CRTC Decision	Notes
Allardville	CBAL-FM-1	101.9 FM	13,300 watts	C1	Query	97-367	47°22′39″N 65°26′20.04″W
Campbellton	CBAL-FM-3	88.9 FM	27,400 watts	C1	Query	2000-147	48°4′58.08″N 66°34′50.16″W; Transmitter site in Quebec
Edmundston	CBAL-FM-5	94.3 FM	100,000 watts	C1	Query	2002-120	47°23′21.12″N 68°18′57.96″W
Saint John	CBAL-FM-4	88.1 FM	78,500 watts	C	Query		45°28′40.08″N 66°14′3.84″W; Also serves Fredericton
Grande-Anse	CBAL-FM-2	95.3 FM	941 watts	A	Query		47°49′0.84″N 65°8′49.92″W

On February 2, 2006, the CRTC approved the CBC's application to decrease CBAL's effective radiated power from 77,000 watts to 67,600 watts and by increasing the antenna height.
