= CFQM-FM =

Radio station in New Brunswick, Canada

Coordinates: 45°51′06″N 64°48′44″W

- Moncton, New Brunswick; Canada
- Broadcast area: Greater Moncton
- Frequency: 103.9 MHz
- Branding: 103.9 Max FM

Programming
- Format: Classic hits

Ownership
- Owner: Maritime Broadcasting System
- Sister stations: CKCW-FM, CHOY-FM

History
- First air date: March 1, 1977
- Call sign meaning: Canada's Finest Quality Music

Technical information
- Class: C
- ERP: 70,000 watts
- HAAT: 262 metres (860 ft)

Links
- Webcast: Listen Live
- Website: 1039maxfm.com

CFQM-FM (103.9 MHz) is a Canadian FM radio station broadcasting from Moncton, New Brunswick, and owned by the Maritime Broadcasting System. The station currently airs a classic hits format and is branded on-air as 103.9 Max FM. Since 1977, the station has had numerous music formats such as easy listening, MOR and adult contemporary. From 1979 to 1998, it had a successful country format.

Every weekend, CFQM plays vintage American Top 40 countdown shows hosted by Casey Kasem, one from the 1980s every Saturday morning, and one from the 1970s every Sunday morning. Sister stations CHNS-FM in Halifax, Nova Scotia, CKPE-FM in Sydney, CKTO-FM in Truro, Nova Scotia, CIKX-FM in Grand Falls, New Brunswick, CJCJ-FM in Woodstock, New Brunswick, CKBC-FM in Bathurst, New Brunswick and CJYC-FM in Saint John also do this.

== History ==
=== CRTC approval ===
In 1976, Island Radio Broadcasting Co. received approval by the CRTC to operate a new FM radio station at 103.9 FM with an effective radiated power of 24,600 watts as it would be the first FM radio station in Moncton. The company had requested the 95.7 FM frequency for this station, but the CBC wanted that frequency to be reserved for its future use in the Atlantic region.

Island Radio was a division of Eastern Broadcasting Co. Ltd, which became the Maritime Broadcasting System (MBS Radio) in the 1980s.

=== Going on the air ===
CFQM first signed on the air on March 1, 1977, originally with an easy listening format. At the time, Moncton had three radio stations-privately owned sister station CKCW-AM; CBA-AM, a 50,000-watt clear-channel CBC public network station outlet; and CBAF-AM, the French counterpart of the CBC/Radio-Canada network for Atlantic Canada.

In 1979, the Maritime provinces only had a handful FM terrestrial radio stations: CFBC-FM, CKWM-FM, CJCB-FM, CBC Stereo (CBH-FM), CHFX-FM, and CIOO-FM. Owing to the CRTC mandate, it prohibited the same genre of music to be heard full-time. Late evening and weekend blocks were set aside for specialty variety programs such as journals, classical and French music which abided by its licence requirements and agreements.

=== Country music ===
In January 1979, CFQM switched to a country format, re-branding itself as Country 104 FM CFQM (representing its FM 104 dial position). Prior to the station's format switch to country, sister station CKCW-AM filled the format void with an afternoon country music block throughout the latter part of the 1960s and early 1970s. Coincidentally, its call sign stood for Canada Knows Country and Western (during CKCW's days as a country music station). John Richard (JR) took the helm as morning drive DJ in 1980, and lead to successful ratings periods for the station. Other slogans of CFQM in the 1980s were Country Stereo 104 FM and FM-104 CFQM. Subsequently, during the 1990s, new country slogans would be introduced to the station until its format change in 1998.

Until new facilities for MBS Radio (formerly Eastern Broadcasting) were built in 1981, both stations operated from the Assumption Complex in downtown Moncton. CFQM was in the City Hall building (currently the Clinidata Building), while CKCW-AM was in the lobby of the Assumption Place. Notably, the two stations shared the same newsman/journalist. CKCW's studios were visible from the Assumption Place main entrance. Subsequently, after CKCW left its downtown location in July 1981, a private French radio station, CHLR-AM, began broadcasting from the former studios in October of that same year.

On June 7, 1988, CFQM was granted an application to increase their power from 24,300 to 70,000 watts.

=== Max FM ===
In 1998, CFQM's country format moved to sister station CKCW with CFQM flipping to an adult contemporary format as Magic 104 FM. In 2001, CKCW moved from the AM band to 94.5 FM, and became known as K94.5. On July 31, 2009, the station flipped to its current classic hits format as 103.9 Max FM. The station has recently added 1990s and current tracks to its playlist.
