= CKNB-FM =

Radio station in Campbellton, New Brunswick

Coordinates: 48°00′54″N 66°35′06″W

- Campbellton, New Brunswick; Canada
- Broadcast area: Addington Parish
- Frequency: 100.7 MHz
- Branding: Hits 100 FM

Programming
- Language: English
- Format: Adult contemporary

Ownership
- Owner: Maritime Broadcasting System

History
- First air date: December 27, 1939
- Former frequencies: 1210 kHz (1939–1941); 1240 kHz (1941–1942); 950 kHz (1942–2022)
- Call sign meaning: Campbellton, New Brunswick

Technical information
- Class: B
- ERP: 5,330 watts
- HAAT: 182.3 metres (598 ft)

Links
- Webcast: Listen Live
- Website: hits100fm.ca

CKNB-FM is a Canadian radio station broadcasting in Campbellton, New Brunswick at 100.7 FM. The station currently airs an adult contemporary format branded as Hits 100 FM and is owned and operated by the Maritime Broadcasting System. CKNB's studios are located at 74 Water Street in Downtown Campbellton.

== History ==
The station, CKNB originally signed on the air on December 27, 1939 at 1210 AM until it moved to AM 1240 in 1941, and then settled to its AM position at 950 kc in 1942.

When CKNB was on AM 950, the station was heard over much of Atlantic Canada at night, using a good radio.

On July 9, 2021, Maritime Broadcasting System submitted an application to convert CKNB to 100.7 MHz with an average effective radiated power (ERP) of 2,570 watts (maximum ERP of 5,330 watts with an effective height of antenna above average terrain of 182.3 metres). This application was approved on January 26, 2022.

Logo used from the mid-1990s until November 2022

On November 14, 2022 at 8:00 AM, the station moved to the FM dial at 100.7 relaunching as Hits 100 FM with their new slogan "Hits For Campbellton". The first song on "Hits" was "About Damn Time" by Lizzo.
