= Maritime Broadcasting System =

Canadian radio station group

- Company type: Private
- Industry: Radio broadcasting
- Founded: 1969 as Eastern Broadcasting Limited
- Headquarters: Halifax, Nova Scotia
- Area served: Atlantic Canada
- Website: MBS Radio

Maritime Broadcasting System Limited, branded as MBS Radio, is a private Canadian broadcasting company owning 26 radio stations serving several communities in Nova Scotia, Prince Edward Island, and New Brunswick.

== History ==
MBS Radio was established in 1969 as Eastern Broadcasting Limited in Campbellton, New Brunswick and is currently owned by Rob Pace. The company's head office is now located in Halifax, Nova Scotia on Lovett Lake Court in the Bayers Lake area. Prior to moving to its new location at Lovett Lake Court, they were located on Sackville Street in Downtown Halifax.

On October 28, 2011, Maritime Broadcasting System Ltd. applied to the CRTC to operate a new country FM radio station at Miramichi, New Brunswick. MBS planned on operating the station at 102.5 MHz, but the CRTC denied the request.

Unionized staff at three MBS stations in Saint John, CFBC, CIOK-FM, CJYC-FM, went on strike in June 2012; the strike lasted close to two years. Employees signed a deal in May 2014 and returned to work.

On February 8, 2024, MBS announced that it would acquire five stations in New Brunswick and Nova Scotia from Bell Media, including CIKX-FM, CJCJ-FM, CKBC-FM, CKTO-FM, and CKTY-FM. The sale was approved by the CRTC on December 20, 2024.

== Stations ==
| City of licence | Call sign | Frequency | On-air branding | Format |
|---|---|---|---|---|
| Amherst, Nova Scotia | CKDH-FM | 101.7 FM | 101.7 CKDH | Country |
| Bathurst, New Brunswick | CKBC-FM | 104.9 FM | 104.9 The Wave | Classic hits |
| Campbellton, New Brunswick | CKNB-FM | 100.7 FM | Hits 100 FM | Adult contemporary |
| Charlottetown, Prince Edward Island | CFCY-FM | 95.1 FM | 95.1 CFCY | Country |
| Charlottetown, Prince Edward Island | CHLQ-FM | 93.1 FM | Max 93.1 | Classic rock |
| Grand Falls, New Brunswick | CIKX-FM | 93.5 FM | 93.5 The Wave | Classic hits |
| Halifax, Nova Scotia | CHFX-FM | 101.9 FM | FX101.9 | Country |
| Halifax, Nova Scotia | CHNS-FM | 89.9 FM | 89.9 The Wave | Classic hits |
| Kentville, Nova Scotia | CKEN-FM | 97.7 FM | AVR | Country |
| Kentville, Nova Scotia | CKWM-FM | 94.9 FM | Magic 94.9 | Adult contemporary |
| Miramichi, New Brunswick | CFAN-FM | 99.3 FM | 99.3 The River | Country |
| Moncton, New Brunswick | CFQM-FM | 103.9 FM | 103.9 Max FM | Classic hits |
| Moncton, New Brunswick | CHOY-FM | 99.9 FM | Choix FM 99,9 | Country (French) |
| Moncton, New Brunswick | CKCW-FM | 94.5 FM | K94.5 | Adult contemporary |
| Saint John, New Brunswick | CFBC | 930 AM | 93 CFBC | Country |
| Saint John, New Brunswick | CIOK-FM | 100.5 FM | K100 | Adult contemporary |
| Saint John, New Brunswick | CJYC-FM | 98.9 FM | Kool 98 | Classic hits |
| Summerside, Prince Edward Island | CJRW-FM | 102.1 FM | 102 Spud FM | Adult contemporary |
| Sussex, New Brunswick | CJCW-FM | 92.9 FM | CJCW 92.9 FM | Adult contemporary |
| Sydney, Nova Scotia | CHER-FM | 98.3 FM | Max 98.3 | Classic rock |
| Sydney, Nova Scotia | CJCB | 1270 AM | 1270 CJCB | Country |
| Sydney, Nova Scotia | CKPE-FM | 94.9 FM | 94.9 The Wave | Classic hits |
| Truro, Nova Scotia | CKTO-FM | 100.9 FM | 100.9 The Wave | Classic hits |
| Truro, Nova Scotia | CKTY-FM | 99.5 FM | Cat Country 99.5 | Country |
| Windsor, Nova Scotia | CFAB | 1450 AM | AVR | Country |
| Woodstock, New Brunswick | CJCJ-FM | 104.1 FM | 104.1 The Wave | Classic hits |
