= CKCW-FM =

Radio station in Moncton, New Brunswick

Coordinates: 46°08′41″N 64°54′11″W

- Moncton, New Brunswick; Canada
- Broadcast area: Greater Moncton
- Frequency: 94.5 MHz
- Branding: K94.5

Programming
- Format: Adult contemporary

Ownership
- Owner: Maritime Broadcasting System
- Sister stations: CFQM-FM, CHOY-FM

History
- First air date: December 4, 1934
- Former call signs: CKCW (1934–2001)
- Former frequencies: 1370 kHz (AM) (1934–1941); 1400 kHz (1941–1946); 1220 kHz (1946–2001)
- Call sign meaning: unofficially meant "Canada Knows Country and Western" during its days as a country station

Technical information
- Class: B
- ERP: 19 kW
- HAAT: 178.7 metres (586 ft)

Links
- Website: k945.ca

CKCW-FM is a Canadian radio station broadcasting at 94.5 FM in Moncton, New Brunswick. The station plays an adult contemporary format branded as K94.5 and is owned by the Maritime Broadcasting System.

== History ==
CKCW originally began broadcasting on December 4, 1934, at 1370 AM, with only 100 watts of power. The station was originally owned and operated by Moncton Broadcasting Company Ltd, managed by F.A. (Fred) Lynds. The AM frequency changed to 1400 in 1941, and then to its final AM position at 1220 in 1946. Eastern Radio Broadcasting (now known as MBS Radio) purchased CKCW in 1972. CKCW was the only privately owned AM radio station ever to operate in Moncton. Over the years, many radio personalities who worked at CKCW would attain such bigger success in larger markets such as Brother Jake, Bob Powers, Marty Kingston, Larry Hennessey and Joan Watson (later host of CBC's Marketplace).

In 1976, CKCW's sister station was granted a licence to operate on the FM band at 103.9 FM, marking the first FM radio station in Moncton. CFQM-FM first went on the air in 1977 with an easy listening format that aired until its switched to country on January 1, 1979.

A co-owned television station, CKCW-TV, signed on the air in 1954 but was sold to CHUM Limited in 1972. CHUM Limited, which owned and operated CKCW-TV, became CTV Globemedia in 2007, and then Bell Media in 2011. CKCW-TV is now part of the CTV Atlantic (formerly ATV) network.

During the 1990s, CKCW had an adult contemporary/easy listening format; then in 1994, the station switched to an oldies format. In August 1998, the station switched formats with sister station CFQM-FM, which relaunched as an AC station as Magic 104 and CKCW becoming a country station.

Original K 94.5 logo

In 2001, CKCW moved to 94.5 FM, and changed to a Top 40/CHR format, branded as "Moncton's Newest Music", K94.5. The new "K94.5" enjoyed early success with the new music format; however, constant tweaking of the format and lack of advertising led to its downfall. By 2009, when sister station CFQM-FM switched from adult contemporary to classic hits, the station switched to its current hot adult contemporary format, but kept the same branding.

CKCW was the first station to hire international syndicated radio star AJ Reynolds.

== Former on-air radio personalities ==
- Pat Donelan
- Ron Bourgeois (aka "The Little General" came to Moncton in the early 1960s, Afternoon Fill-in and Staff Announcer 1969–1974)
- Rick Shalala (Evenings 1969-1972 circa)
- Bob Steeves (P.D. 1966–1973)
- Art Noiles (Sports 1969–1977, AHL Play by Play NB Hawks)
- Doug Pond (MD/Afternoons 1967–1971, PD/Mornings 1974-1980/NB Hawks-Colour 1978–1980; PD/Afternoons 1984–1989; MD/Afternoons; From 1984 to 1995 host of Canadian Top 40 and Weekend Oldies Syndicated Shows. Also mornings CJBK London Ontario, Mornings/PD CFBC Saint John, PD/Afternoons CIHI Fredericton, PD CKLC Kingston, Ontario; Weekend Mornings C-103, Moncton.
- Sandy Gillis (Mornings 1972–1974; EBS Management 1975–1995)
- Roy Geldart (News 1972–1980, News Director & Editorial Writer)
- Dave Lockhart (News 1973–2006, "Talk Back" host and News Director 1984–2006)
- Alan K. Parkes (News 1973–1978, 1980–1981)
- Ed Lesley (News 1973–1976)
- Garnet Dee (Afternoons 1973–1978, Middays 1978–1979)
- Gerry Proctor (News mid 1970s)
- Don Rodie (Evenings 1973–1976)
- Greg Buckner (Swing Announcer 1975–1979)
- Rick Gordon (Midday Announcer 1975–1980)
- Wayne Spencer (News All day parts, 1975–2002)
- "Bro" Jake Edwards (Vernon Mazerolle) Evenings/Weekend afternoon 1976-1979: CFMI (1996–2013); CKST (2013)
- Andy K
- Bob Powers (Evenings 1977–1979) (The Legend)
- John Richard (JR) (1978–1980, Later with CFQM-FM and CJSE-FM)
- Marty Kingston (Sports 1978–1982, AHL Play by Play, Later with Rock 103)
- John Bulger (News 1978–1980; 1987–1993)
- Al Webster (News 1978–1980)
- Jim Trites (Evenings 1979–83, Afternoons 1983–1984)
- Robin Geoffries (Mornings 1980–1987)
- Larry Hennessey (Morning host 1981)
- Chris Scott (1981)
- Tom (Chris) Reiser (Evenings 1983–1984)
- Kevin Clements (1984–1985), Also CIHI Fredericton, Rock-103 Moncton, CJSS Cornwall, CHRO-TV (Announce/Producer/Director)
- Gair Maxwell (Sports/News 1984–1999 / AHL Play-by-Play - Moncton Hawks) Also CJCW Sussex, CKRD Red Deer, CFCN Calgary /Best-selling author "Big Little Legends"
- Don Martin (Evenings and Weekends 1984–1986) "Countdown Atlantic""
- Paul Martin (Evenings 1985)
- Larry Christian (Midday Announcer 1985-1987, Mornings 1987-1998)
- John Kennedy (Evenings & Weekend Mornings 1984-85)
- Troy Tait (Evenings 1985-1986, Swing Announcer & Asst. P.D. 1988-1991, 1993–1997, Mornings 1998-2003)
- Mike Allain (O/N 1986-1987, Evenings and Weekends 1988-1989, afternoons 1998-2000)
- J.T. Edwards (Evenings 1986-1988 and weekends)
- Troy Swinnemar
- Ian Hanomansing (News 1970s)
- "The Real" Gary Theal (Woody) (1981–1982)
- Dale Alstrup (Evenings 1987–1988)
- Robert Burns (News Midday and Afternoons, 1989–2002)
- Scotty Horsman (Evenings 1991–1996, Mornings early 2000s)
- Steve Power (O/Night, Evenings & Swing, 1992–2000)
- Moe Jacob (O/Night, Evenings & Swing, 1989–1993)
- Chris (Crystal) Beers (O/Night, Evenings 1990-1991)
- Tosh Taylor (Mornings with Night and Tosh, then the KRise with Josh and Tosh)
- Geoff Campbell (News Afternoon and weekends 1997 - 2000)
- Nathan Knight (Mornings with Knight and Tosh)
- Colin Mckay (Evenings & Weekends 2001–2003)
- John Knox (Knox @ Night 2002–2004)
- Mick Stockley (1968-early 1970s afternoon show)
- Brian Mackenzie (Sign-On Morning man/Copy late 1960s-1970s)
- Jessy Horton (Evenings 2012–2014)
- Taylor Whittamore (Mornings 2012–2013)
- Bree Cancade (Mornings 2013)
- Mike Sanderson (Mid-days, Afternoons, Kutting Edge night show (2015–2017), 2013–2017, now with CKNI)
- Josh McLellan (Evenings, Production, Afternoons, Music Director 2006–2014)
- Shane-O
- Paul Thomas was the second voice on
- Earl Ross (Sports 1960s)
- Garth Cooper (Sports & Country Western, Sales, CKCD-TV Campbellton Manager, 1962-1972 era)
- Dave Reynolds (1960s, eventually Hockey Night in Canada)
- Krysta Jay
- Robert Barrie CFQM Afternoon Drive - Fall 1984 and CKCW/CFQM News 1985-1987
- Jamie Hamilton CFQM Evenings 1979-1980 Magic 104 Sunday Mornings
- Alfred (AJ) Reynolds (Afternoons 1998–2000, Overnights 2000–2003 at CFNY-FM, host of Canada's Top 20 Countdown)
