= Grand Falls, New Brunswick =

Grand Falls Grand-Sault
- Town
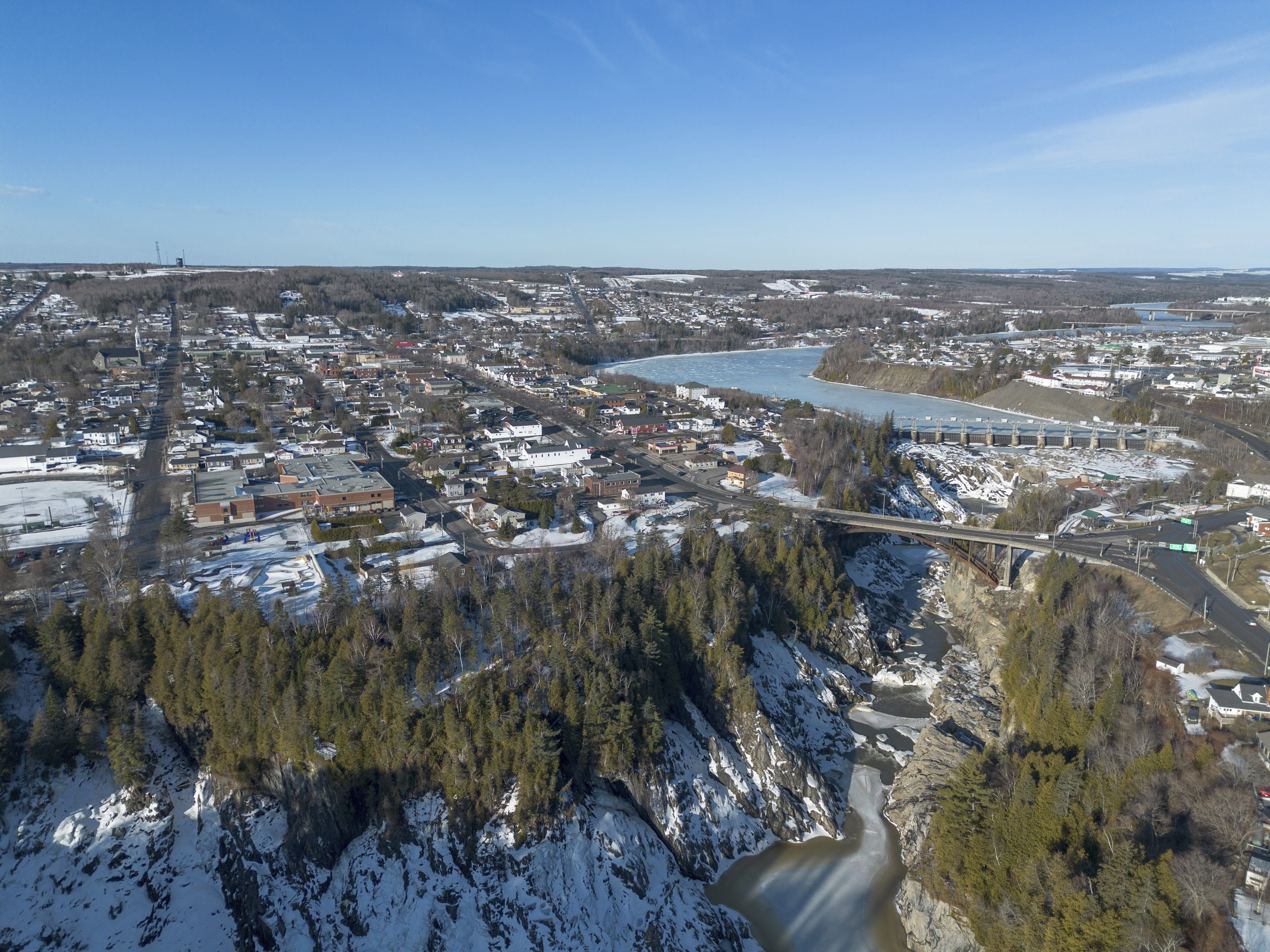
- Grand Falls in 2026

- Coat of arms Logo
- Motto: Cor Unum (Latin: "For One Heart")
- Location within New Brunswick
- Coordinates: 47°02′04″N 67°44′22″W
- Country: Canada
- Province: New Brunswick
- County: Victoria County
- Parishes: Grand Falls Parish
- Settled: 1791
- Incorporated: April 23, 1890

Government
  - Type: Town Council
  - Mayor: Bertrand Beaulieu
  - MP: Richard Bragdon (Con..)
  - MLA: Chuck Chiasson (Lib.)

Area
  - Land: 18.04 km^{2} (6.97 sq mi)
- Elevation: 160 m (520 ft)

Population (2021)
  - Total: 5,220
  - Density: 289.3/km^{2} (749/sq mi)
  - Change (2016–21): ▼2.0%
- Time zone: UTC−4 (Atlantic (AST))
  - Summer (DST): UTC−3 (ADT)
- Canadian Postal code: E3Z
- Area code: 506
- Telephone Exchange: 426, 473, 475, 477, 479, 481, 582
- NTS Map: 21O4 Grand Falls-Grand Sault
- GNBC Code: DAICU
- Website: www.grandfallsnb.com

Grand Falls (French: Grand-Sault) is a town in northwestern New Brunswick, Canada, on the Saint John River. Its name comes from a waterfall created by a series of rock ledges over which the river drops 23 metres (75 ft).

On 1 January 2023, Grand Falls expanded to include Drummond, the rural community of Saint-André, the local service district of the parish of Grand Falls, and part of the LSD of the parish of Drummond. Revised census figures have not been released.

== History ==
In 1686, Monsignor de Saint-Vallier (of Quebec) was the first known person to mention in writing the magnificent falls for which Grand Falls is named. His words describing the area can be found on a monument erected at the mouth of Davis Park in 1986. He recounts his trip to the region in 1686. He writes: "On May 16 we arrived at a place called Grand Sault St-Jean-Baptiste. Here the river falls madly from a height of 60 feet, forming a huge waterfall that thick fog envelops the tumult of the falls far warns mariners descended in canoes. It also notes the presence of some French settlers in the region. In 1695, the territory between Grand Falls and Médoctec was granted the manor in Sieur Rene D'Amours. The French missionaries, Récollets, visited Great Falls in 1691 and Antoine de Lamothe Cadillac mentioned the presence of a fort in 1693. The latter was used to supply the passengers, who became more numerous from the Seven Years' War.

In 1763, the region fully passed into British hands and its French population diminished due to the Expulsion of the Acadians. In 1783, the Loyalists settled in Acadia and the province of New Brunswick was created the next year. In 1785, the Acadians in Fredericton and nearby were evicted from their land and in June 1785, a group decided to establish the region of Grand Falls and the rest of Madawaska and this with the agreement of the Maliseet people.

In 1791, Thomas Carleton, then Governor of New Brunswick, built a fort at Grand Falls. The Madawaska region was then disputed between Quebec, New Brunswick and the United States. The War of 1812 showed that the area's roads were not safe and in 1875, the colonial government of New Brunswick decided to build a road from Woodstock to Grand Falls. In 1816, the government gave a grant to two settlers to settle between Grand Falls and Presque Isle. The territorial differences culminated in the Aroostook War in 1838 and Webster–Ashburton Treaty in 1842, gave Grand Falls to the province of New Brunswick. In 1838, James Brown and George Hayward visited Grand Falls and mentioned the presence of a sawmill owned by John Caldwell staffed by French Canadians and Acadians. In 1840, Lieutenant Cavalié Mercer, an Englishman stationed in Woodstock, made the first paintings of the city. In 1842, Grand Falls was included in Colebrook Township, named in honour of the Governor of New Brunswick, William MacBean George Colebrooke. The first survey was done for the British army in 1844 by the Deputy Gordon, while Colonel Beckwith designed the town plan. The survey was made from a large elm to the west, which has now disappeared. The lots were in turn divided into 1847 by the engineer C. Inches.

In 1904, Van Morrell, originally from the State of Maine, crossed the falls on a tightrope. The ring to which this rope was attached can still be found in O.B Davis Park

== Geography ==
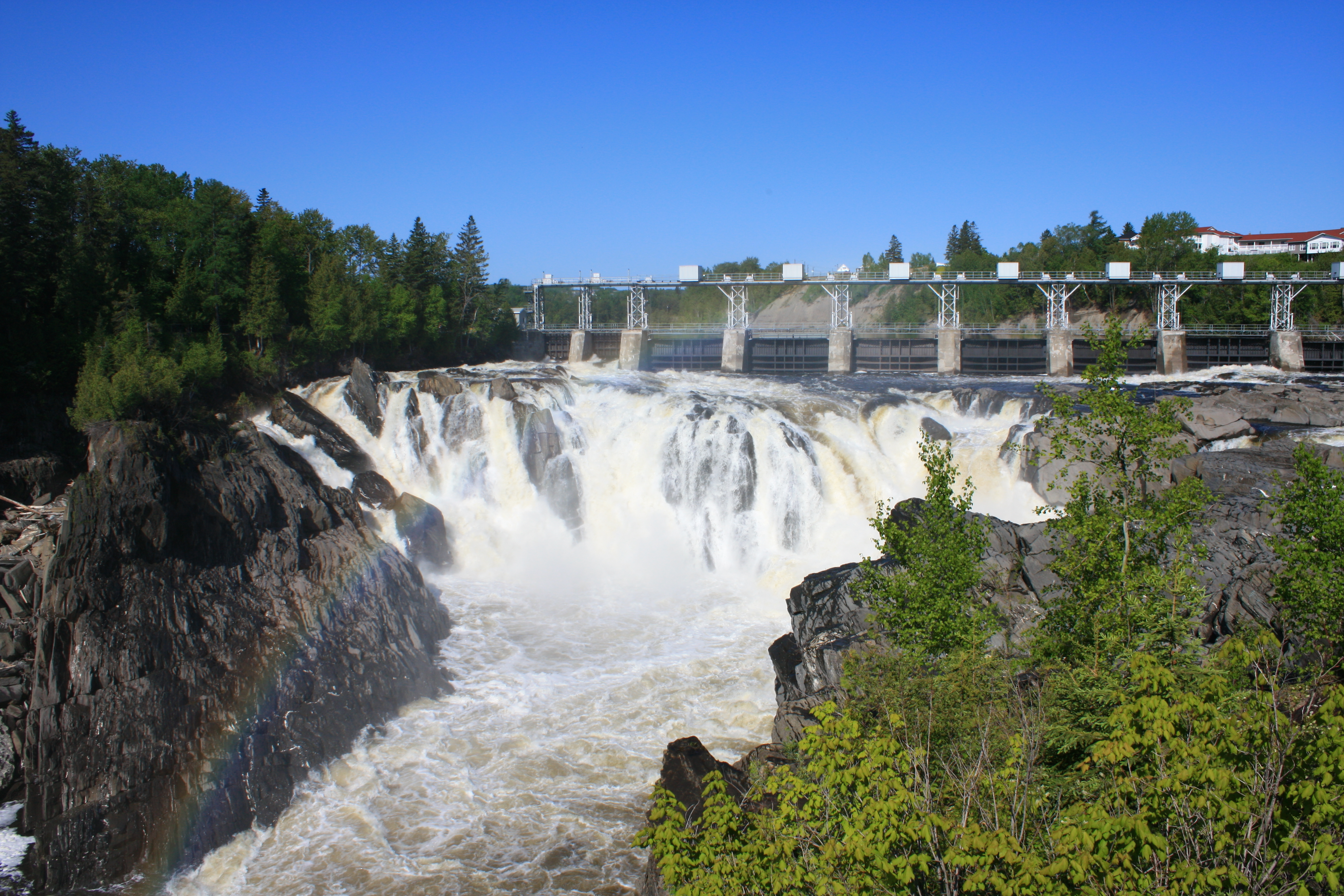
Grand Falls, New Brunswick

Grand Falls is located in the valley of the Saint John River, south of Madawaska, 55 kilometres southeast of Edmundston, on the Canada–United States border.

Grand Falls is located at the north-west of Victoria County. The eastern part of the town, located on the left bank of the river is actually in the county of Madawaska, not to be confused with the eponymous region. Aroostook County, Maine is located to the west. Grand Falls is adjacent to St. André to the north, and the parish of Drummond to the east.

=== Climate ===
Grand Falls has a humid continental climate (Köppen Dfb) with vast seasonal differences and being cold for the latitude.

Climate data for Grand Falls, New Brunswick (1981−2010)
Month	Jan	Feb	Mar	Apr	May	Jun	Jul	Aug	Sep	Oct	Nov	Dec	Year
Record high °C (°F)	10.5 (50.9)	11.5 (52.7)	16.0 (60.8)	27.5 (81.5)	33.0 (91.4)	33.9 (93.0)	33.5 (92.3)	32.8 (91.0)	29.5 (85.1)	25.6 (78.1)	18.0 (64.4)	13.9 (57.0)	33.9 (93.0)
Mean daily maximum °C (°F)	−8.5 (16.7)	−5.2 (22.6)	0.0 (32.0)	7.9 (46.2)	16.8 (62.2)	20.5 (68.9)	23.2 (73.8)	22.2 (72.0)	16.9 (62.4)	9.9 (49.8)	2.2 (36.0)	−5.2 (22.6)	8.4 (47.1)
Daily mean °C (°F)	−13.2 (8.2)	−10.1 (13.8)	−4.7 (23.5)	3.5 (38.3)	11.0 (51.8)	15.1 (59.2)	17.9 (64.2)	17.2 (63.0)	12.0 (53.6)	5.9 (42.6)	−1.0 (30.2)	−9.1 (15.6)	3.7 (38.7)
Mean daily minimum °C (°F)	−17.8 (0.0)	−14.9 (5.2)	−9.6 (14.7)	−1.0 (30.2)	5.2 (41.4)	9.7 (49.5)	12.6 (54.7)	12.1 (53.8)	7.1 (44.8)	2.0 (35.6)	−4.1 (24.6)	−13.0 (8.6)	−1.0 (30.2)
Record low °C (°F)	−36.7 (−34.1)	−35.6 (−32.1)	−38 (−36)	−18.5 (−1.3)	−7.8 (18.0)	0.0 (32.0)	2.8 (37.0)	0.0 (32.0)	−4.0 (24.8)	−9.4 (15.1)	−22 (−8)	−34 (−29)	−38.0 (−36.4)
Average precipitation mm (inches)	100.3 (3.95)	66.1 (2.60)	70.8 (2.79)	78.1 (3.07)	86.8 (3.42)	101.1 (3.98)	116.4 (4.58)	130.7 (5.15)	96.2 (3.79)	101.1 (3.98)	103.4 (4.07)	90.6 (3.57)	1,141.6 (44.94)
Average rainfall mm (inches)	20.5 (0.81)	9.1 (0.36)	31.3 (1.23)	56.6 (2.23)	86.1 (3.39)	101.1 (3.98)	116.4 (4.58)	130.7 (5.15)	96.2 (3.79)	99.6 (3.92)	73.1 (2.88)	30.4 (1.20)	851.1 (33.51)
Average snowfall cm (inches)	79.8 (31.4)	57.1 (22.5)	39.6 (15.6)	21.5 (8.5)	0.7 (0.3)	0.0 (0.0)	0.0 (0.0)	0.0 (0.0)	0.0 (0.0)	1.5 (0.6)	30.3 (11.9)	60.2 (23.7)	290.5 (114.4)
Average precipitation days (≥ 0.2 mm)	11.9	11.1	11.1	13.9	13.9	14.4	13.2	14.8	13.1	13.7	13.7	13.4	158.1
Average rainy days (≥ 0.2 mm)	1.8	2.0	4.7	11.4	13.9	14.4	13.2	14.8	13.1	13.5	10.2	4.1	117.2
Average snowy days (≥ 0.2 cm)	10.7	9.6	7.6	3.9	0.25	0.0	0.0	0.0	0.0	0.58	5.5	10.6	48.6
Source: Environment Canada

== Demographics ==
In the 2021 Census of Population conducted by Statistics Canada, Grand Falls had a population of 5,220 living in 2,495 of its 2,639 total private dwellings, a change of −2% from its 2016 population of 5,326. With a land area of 18.04 km^{2} (6.97 sq mi), it had a population density of 289.4/km^{2} (749.4/sq mi) in 2021.

Historical population

Year	Pop.	±%
1901	644	—
1911	1,280	+98.8%
1921	1,327	+3.7%
1931	1,556	+17.3%
1941	1,806	+16.1%

Year	Pop.	±%
1951	2,365	+31.0%
1961	3,983	+68.4%
1981	6,203	+55.7%
1986	6,209	+0.1%
1991	6,083	−2.0%

Year	Pop.	±%
1996	6,133	+0.8%
2001	5,858	−4.5%
2006	5,650	−3.6%
2011	5,706	+1.0%
2016	5,326	−6.7%

Religious make-up (2001)

Religion	Population	Pct (%)
Catholic	5,315	92.84%
Protestant	235	4.10%
No religious affiliation	160	2.79%
Christian n.i.e.	10	0.18%
Variable	5	0.09%

Income (2015)

Income type	By CAD
Median Individual Income	$29,165
Median Household Income	$50,211
Median Family Income	$68,659

Mother tongue (2016)

Language	Population	Pct (%)
French	4,205	80.71%
English	875	16.79%
English and French	90	1.73%
Other Languages	35	0.67%
French and Non-Official Language	5	0.10

Education (2016)

Level of education	Population	Pct (%)
No certificate, diploma, or degree	1,155	25.98%
Secondary (high) school diploma or equivalency certificate	1,340	30.15%
Apprenticeship or trades certificate or diploma	420	9.45%
College, CEGEP or other non-university certificate or diploma	675	15.18%
University certificate or diploma below the bachelor level	140	3.15%
University certificate, diploma or degree at bachelor level or above	705	15.86%
Variable	10	0.23%

Grand Falls stands as the most bilingual town in Canada at 78.5% speaking English and French and is only one of two municipalities in Canada with an official bilingual name. The other is Greater Sudbury. (fr: Grand-Sudbury)

== Economy ==
Three main industries reside in Grand Falls: potato farming, potato processing (The McCain frozen food plant) and tourism. The town is also a local commercial centre for Victoria County, catering to the surrounding communities of Plaster Rock, Perth Andover, Blue Bell, and New Denmark.

Tourism centres around the Saint John River’s falls and gorge located in the centre of town. Two tourist attractions line the river; the Malabeam Information Centre and La Rochelle. The Malabeam Centre faces the falls and is across the Grand Falls Farmers Market located on Madawaska Road. Through La Rochelle, you may access the 75-metre gorge via stairwell, which contains 401 steps. Near this location, you will find the Falls and Gorge Campground, which provides access to the Camel's back, an impressive rock formation. All of these sites can be visited by following a 1.6KM walking path with the option of a guided tour that can be scheduled with the Malabeam Information Centre.

The falls are also home to the Grand Falls Generating Station which provides electrical power by use of a hydro electric dam completed in 1931, and provides 66 MW of electricity through four Francis turbines.

== Activities ==
Among the main activities located in Grand Falls, one can visit the Grand Falls Golf Course, the Grand Falls Marina, the Grand Falls Museum, the Farmer’s Market (Summer)/ Drummond Farmers Market (Winter), numerous camp grounds, and the Grand Falls Airport (www.grandfallsaviation.com). The town of Grand Falls has also acquired an arena, the E & P Sénéchal Centre. The multi-purpose 1200+ heated seat arena opened in late August 2009. The town also has a cross-country ski club, Kahoutek Ski and Mountain Biking Club, a dragon boating club with many kilometers of groomed trails adjacent to the Golf Club and the E.P. Senechal Centre.

There are many outdoor activities you can do in Grand Falls such as zip lining by the gorge and waterfalls, kayaking, canoeing, or boating along the Saint John river.

Most tourist-centric locations are only opened during the tourist season.

== Culture ==
Every year the town celebrates its Regional Potato Festival. This event coincides with the end of June and beginning of July, during the Canada Day weekend. It includes a Broadway block party, a bistro with live entertainment, fireworks, and several other events.

== Education ==
- John Caldwell School: K-12
- École Polyvalente Thomas-Albert: Grade 7-12
- École Élémentaire Sacré-Coeur: K-6
- Centre of Excellence in Agricultural and Biotechnological Sciences (CESAB)
- Collège communautaire du Nouveau-Brunswick (CCNB)
- Grand Falls Public Library
- École Mgr-Lang de Drummond: K-6
- École Régionale de Saint-André: K-6

The Grand Falls Public Library began as a small group of readers forming the Literary Club founded by Senator Muriel McQueen Fergusson. Members campaigned in 1948 to establish a formal library and the Grand Falls Public Library officially opened its doors for the first time on April 20, 1949. The library was housed in a small building located on Broadway Boulevard where now stands the Dari Delite Ice Cream Store and was once the old Post Office. In 1950, it then relocated further down the boulevard to the Anita Lagace building, which currently houses LP Godbout Insurance. In June 1972, the library moved a third time to the New Brunswick Electric Power Commission building. It also became incorporated into the Haut-Saint-Jean Library Region in the very same year. In August 1983, the library moved from Broadway Boulevard to the Masonic Hall on the corner of Sheriff and Church Street. Since January 1999, the Grand Falls Public Library has been located on Pleasant Street in the municipal building and it is still part of the Haut-Saint-Jean Library Region, one of the five regions of New Brunswick Public Library Service.

John Caldwell School's first building, a two-story structure, was built on the site of the John Caldwell School in 1909. In 1951, a brick building was built on the same lot. It housed the industrial shops, gymnasium and home economics facilities. It was named the Grand Falls Composite High School. A wing was built in 1966, and in 1969 the name was changed to the John Caldwell School. In 1982, the original wooden building was demolished leaving only the new structure. In 1971, the school became a Junior High School and in 1981 it became the Junior-Senior High School for the anglophone students of the area with Richard Michaud serving as principal from 1966 to 1991. Major expansion began in 1989 to include the English elementary students making it a K-12 facility. Kevin Harding is the current principal.

== Media ==
Grand Falls is serviced by the French daily L'Acadie Nouvelle of Caraquet and the English-language daily Telegraph-Journal of Saint John. The weekly bilingual La Cataracte/Victoria Star is published in the town. The French bi-weekly publication Journal Le NordOuest is available on-line and distributed to more than 5000 members. The French weekly L'Étoile of Dieppe is also distributed, and Tri-Weekly Bugle-Observer and the weekly Carleton Free Press, both published in Woodstock .

Media
Call sign	Frequency	City of License	Owner	Format
CIKX-FM	93.5 FM	Grand Falls	Maritime Broadcasting System	adult contemporary
CKMV-FM	95.1 FM	Grand Falls	Radio Edmundston	adult contemporary (French)
CFAI-FM-1	105.1 FM	Grand Falls	La Coopérative des Montagnes	active rock (French)

== Notable people ==
- Gérard La Forest, former Puisne Justice of the Supreme Court of Canada
- Melissa McClure, 1998 Canadian Junior Curling and World Junior Curling Champions
- Gerry "Red" Ouellette, Canadian ice hockey player/coach
- Tany Yao, Filipino Canadian Chinese paramedic, firefighter
- Ron Turcotte, Canadian jockey Triple Crown of Thoroughbred Champion with Secretariat.
