= Media in Thunder Bay =

This is a list of media outlets in the city of Thunder Bay, Ontario, Canada.

== Television ==
Thunder Bay receives CTV and Global service from a locally owned twinstick operation rather than network-owned stations, the largest city in Canada and the only one in Ontario with such an arrangement.

WBKP channel 5, the CW affiliate in Calumet, Michigan can be received in Thunder Bay with an outdoor roof antenna and a digital-capable television or receiver.

OTA virtual channel (PSIP)	OTA actual channel	Shaw Cable	Call sign	Network	Notes
2.1	2 (VHF)	5	CKPR-DT	CTV	Privately owned affiliate operated by Dougall Media, branded as "CKPR Thunder Bay"
4.1	4 (VHF)	6	CHFD-DT	Global	Privately owned affiliate operated by Dougall Media, branded as "Global Thunder Bay"
9.1	9 (VHF)	8	CICO-DT-9	TVOntario	Rebroadcaster of CICA-DT (Toronto)
–	–	10	–	Shaw Spotlight	Community channel for Shaw Cable subscribers

=== Cable ===
The cable providers in Thunder Bay are Shaw and Tbaytel. The community channel on Shaw Cable is branded as Shaw Spotlight, and airs on cable channel 10.

American network affiliates on cable in Thunder Bay come from Minneapolis–Saint Paul: KSTP-TV (ABC), WCCO-TV (CBS), KARE (NBC), KTCA (PBS/TPT) and KMSP-TV (Fox). Other Canadian network affiliates available to all cable subscribers in Thunder Bay include CBLT-DT (CBC) and CBLFT-DT (Ici Radio-Canada) from Toronto, Ontario and CFTM-DT (TVA) from Montreal, Quebec.

== Radio ==
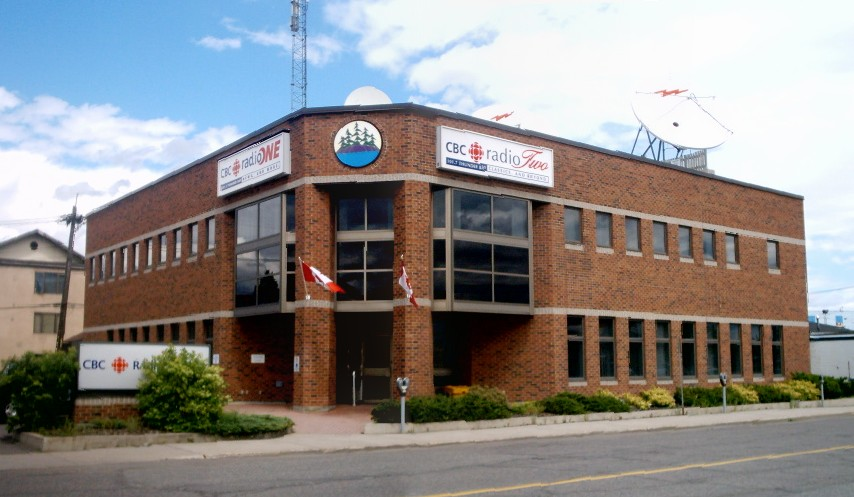
CBC's Thunder Bay studio

Thunder Bay is home to 11 radio stations, all of which broadcast on the FM band.

There are four commercial radio stations based in the city — Rock 94 and 91.5 CKPR, owned by Dougall Media, the parent company of Thunder Bay Television and Thunder Bay Source, and 99.9 The Bay and Country 105, owned by Acadia Broadcasting Limited. The city receives CBC Radio One as CBQT-FM and CBC Music as CBQ-FM, at 88.3 FM and 101.7 FM respectively. The French Première Chaîne is available as a repeater of Sudbury-based CBON-FM on 89.3 FM. Lakehead University operates a campus radio station, CILU-FM, at 102.7 FM.

On May 16, 2008, the Native Evangelical Fellowship of Canada was given approval by the CRTC for a broadcasting licence to operate a specialty low-power FM commercial radio programming undertaking in Pickle Lake and a transmitter in Thunder Bay. The station broadcasts at 96.5 FM in Pickle Lake and has a rebroadcaster at 98.1 FM in Thunder Bay. It airs content in English, Ojibwe, Cree, and Oji-Cree

Frequency	Call sign	Branding	Format	Owner	Notes
FM 88.3	CBQT-FM	CBC Radio One	public news/talk	Canadian Broadcasting Corporation	Rebroadcast throughout Northwestern Ontario
FM 89.3	CBON-FM-20	Ici Radio-Canada Première	public news/talk	Canadian Broadcasting Corporation	French, rebroadcaster of CBON-FM (Sudbury)
FM 90.5	CKSI-FM	Thunder Bay Information Radio	Tourist information, weather, emergency information	Thunder Bay Information Radio Inc. (Information Radio)	
FM 91.5	CKPR-FM	91.5 CKPR	adult contemporary	Dougall Media	Formerly broadcast at AM 580
FM 94.3	CJSD-FM	Rock 94	active rock	Dougall Media	
FM 95.1	CJOA-FM	UCB Radio	Christian music	United Christian Broadcasters Media Canada	Rebroadcast in Nipigon, ON at FM 92.5
FM 97.1	CITB-FM		tourist information	Superior Info Radio (Dougall Media)	
FM 98.1	CJTL-FM-1	CJTL The Light	First Nations and Christian Radio	Native Evangelical Fellowship of Canada	Rebroadcast of CJTL-FM Pickle Lake
FM 99.9	CJUK-FM	99.9 The Bay	Classic hits	Acadia Broadcasting Limited	
FM 101.7	CBQ-FM	CBC Music	public music	Canadian Broadcasting Corporation	
FM 102.7	CILU-FM	LU Radio	campus radio	Lakehead University	
FM 105.3	CKTG-FM	Country 105	country music	Acadia Broadcasting Limited	Call letters were CJLB until 2005

=== Out-of-market radio ===
One station, CFQK, operates outside of Thunder Bay, broadcasting on 104.5 FM in Kaministiquia. The main signal is not widely receivable in Thunder Bay itself, although the station also has a rebroadcaster on 103.5 FM in Shuniah, with the call sign CKED, which can be heard in the northeastern part of Thunder Bay. As of 2020, the station broadcasts a hot adult contemporary format, branded as Energy 103/104. CFQK-FM and its rebroadcaster CKED-FM had gone through a number of format changes since the station was launched in 2002.

== Print media ==
Thunder Bay has one daily newspaper, The Chronicle-Journal, which has a circulation of approximately 28,000 and has coverage of all of Northwestern Ontario. There are two weekly newspapers — Thunder Bay Source, operated by Dougall Media, and Canadan Sanomat, a Finnish language paper.

Thunder Bay also has a locally owned monthly arts and culture magazine, The Walleye, which is distributed for free throughout the city and surrounding area. The Walleye is also available online and the website provides insight into the local arts, culture and entertainment scene.

Superior Outdoors is a locally owned outdoor lifestyle magazine that is published twice a year (November and May). The magazine was started in 2007.

Lakehead University's student newspaper is called The Argus, and is published weekly during the school year.

The Chronicle Journal publishes a free weekly called Spot every Thursday, focusing on entertainment.

The city produces a bi-monthly publication to citizens titled yourCity, which is also available online in a PDF format.

NetNewsLedger is a daily updated website that reproduces press releases and lists current events in Thunder Bay, and allows politicians to connect to their constituents.

Great Expectations Marketing publishes four quarterly community newspapers: Bay & Algoma Community, Current River Times, Simpson & Victoria Place, and Westfort Community. The community newspapers feature various local businesses and also support local charities and nonprofit organizations. The newspapers are delivered to community households.
