= CKPR =

CKPR may refer to:

- CKPR (agency), a public relations agency in the United States
- CKPR-FM, a radio station (91.5 FM) licensed to Thunder Bay, Ontario, Canada
- CKPR-DT, a television station (channel 2) licensed to Thunder Bay, Ontario, Canada
- CJSD-FM, a radio station (94.3 FM) licensed to Thunder Bay, Ontario, Canada, which held the call sign CKPR-FM from 1948 to 1992
