= CHTD-FM =

Radio station in St. Stephen, New Brunswick

Coordinates: 45°07′32″N 67°05′36″W

- St. Stephen, New Brunswick; Canada
- Broadcast area: St. Stephen
- Frequency: 98.1 MHz (FM)
- Branding: 98.1 Charlotte FM

Programming
- Format: Classic hits

Ownership
- Owner: Acadia Broadcasting

History
- First air date: May 28, 2001
- Call sign meaning: "The Tide" (former branding)

Technical information
- Class: B
- ERP: 40,000 watts
- HAAT: 167.6 meters

Links
- Webcast: Listen Live
- Website: charlottefm.ca

CHTD-FM is a radio station broadcasting at 98.1 FM in St. Stephen, New Brunswick, Canada. The station plays a classic hits format and is branded on-air as 98.1 Charlotte FM. The station is owned by Acadia Broadcasting.

The station began broadcasting on May 28, 2001.

== On-air staff ==
- Mark Downey
- Cory Morrow
- Mike Richards
- Jonathan Crouse

== Former on-air staff ==
- Perry White
- Kim Levesque
- Allan Scott
- Tracy Hanson
- Brittany Gullison
- Aaron Cosgrove
- Johnny Barker
- John Higgins
- Blair Hamilton
- Jonathan Berriault
- Shawn Richard
- Kyle Moore
- Sarah Legacy
- Jenna Mulholland
- Jessi Hatt

== Station contests ==
- Reverse Trivia
- The Big Kiss Contest
- Mother Daughter Look Alike Contest
- The Tide's Haunted House
- Win & Wed By The Sea
- Various opportunities to win tickets for other draws, shows, etc.

== Former logos ==
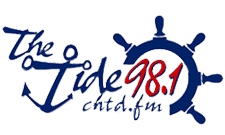
2001–2005

2005–2018

== History ==
On August 24, 2000, New Brunswick Broadcasting Co.Ltd. was awarded a licence for a new FM station at St. Stephen. It would broadcast on a frequency of 98.1 MHz with an effective radiated power of 40,000 watts. The new station would provide the first local radio service available to residents of St. Stephen and Charlotte County. It would feature a blend of adult contemporary and country music targeted to listeners between the ages of 25 and 54.

CHTD signed on the air on May 28, 2001 with a country format branded as 98.1 The Tide. The station simulcast some programming of co-owned CHWV-FM Saint John.

On January 1, 2003, New Brunswick Broadcasting Co. Ltd. and Acadia Broadcasting Co. Ltd. were amalgamated and continued under the name Acadia Broadcasting Ltd.

On June 8, 2005, the CRTC approved a corporate reorganization resulting in the transfer of the ownership and effective control of Acadia Broadcasting Limited, licensee of CHSJ-FM and CHWV-FM Saint John (NB), CHTD St. Stephen (NB), and CKBW-FM Bridgewater (NS), from Brunswick News Inc., a corporation indirectly owned and controlled by J.K. Irving, A.L. Irving and John E. Irving (Irving brothers), to 618042 N.B. Inc., a corporation indirectly owned and controlled by John E. Irving.

On May 8, 2006, CHTD began broadcasting from new studios at 112 Milltown Boulevard.

The CRTC approved the change in the effective control of Acadia Broadcasting Limited from John E. Irving to a joint control exercised by John K.F. Irving and Anne C.I. Oxley, following the death of John E. Irving in 2010. Acadia was the licensee of radio stations in New Brunswick, Nova Scotia and Ontario, following the amalgamation of Northwoods Broadcasting Limited with its mother company Acadia on February 3, 2012.

On August 17, 2012, the CRTC administratively renewed the licence of CHTD to August 31, 2013.

On May 18, 2018, CHTD changed its format to adult contemporary now branded 98.1 Charlotte FM.

On July 1, 2021, CHTD again changed its format to classic hits, making its main competitor WQDY-FM in Calais, Maine.
