= CJUK-FM =

Radio station in Thunder Bay, Ontario

Coordinates: 48°26′13″N 89°13′48″W

- Thunder Bay, Ontario; Canada
- Frequency: 99.9 MHz
- Branding: 99.9 The Bay

Programming
- Format: Classic hits

Ownership
- Owner: Acadia Broadcasting
- Sister stations: CKTG-FM

History
- First air date: August 2001
- Call sign meaning: Canada's Jukebox

Technical information
- Class: A1
- ERP: 250 watts
- HAAT: 36.8 metres (121 ft)

Links
- Webcast: Listen Live
- Website: 999thebay.ca

CJUK-FM is a Canadian radio station, broadcasting at 99.9 FM in Thunder Bay, Ontario. The station broadcasts a classic hits format branded as "99.9 The Bay" and is owned by Acadia Broadcasting.

== History ==
The station was first licensed as a low-power station by the CRTC in 2000, and launched in August 2001 with an ERP of just 37 watts. The station was branded as Magic 99.9. In 2003, the station's owners, Big Pond Communications, applied to the CRTC to increase the station's signal to 15,000 watts, on the grounds that with a signal that could not adequately reach some parts of the city, the station was economically not viable.

However, the CRTC determined that in the previous year's BBM ratings, there was no evidence that the station's audience had geographic gaps in the city. In addition, competing commercial broadcasters noted that the launch of CJUK had significantly affected their own economic stability, and alleged that the station was merely using a "back door" approach toward winning a protected Class A license. The application was consequently denied. Around 2007, the station shifted from adult contemporary to hot adult contemporary, giving the AC format to CKPR-FM, which converted from AM.

In 2005, the station was acquired by Newcap.

On September 24, 2006, Magic morning host Rob Brown died after a short battle with cancer. On October 5, 2006, CJUK (as well as sister station CKTG-FM, and Dougall Media's CJSD-FM and CFQK-FM) aired a commercial free, 1 hour special dedicated to the life and career of Rob Brown. At the end of the show, Magic 99.9 program director Doug Elliott officially announced that the Magic studio had been renamed the "Rob Brown Studio".

On July 14, 2009, Newcap announced it would be selling CJUK and sister station CKTG-FM to Acadia Broadcasting for $4.5 million CAD plus working capital. The sale received CRTC approval on December 2, 2009.

On October 7, 2009, the CRTC approved CJUK-FM to increase its signal to 250 watts from just 37 watts. This would change the status of CJUK-FM from a low-power unprotected service station to a protected Class A1 station. Newcap Broadcasting stated to the CRTC that the change wasn't to improve CJUK-FM's signal outside of Thunder Bay, but actually to improve CJUK-FM's reception within buildings in Thunder Bay.

On August 31, 2018, at 12 p.m. EST, CJUK flipped to classic hits branded as 99.9 The Bay.

== Announcers ==
Weekdays

- 06:00 AM to 10:00 AM - Bay Mornings with Danny Foresta
- 10:00 AM to 02:00 PM - Bay Workday with Kim Leduc
- 02:00 PM to 06:00 PM - The Drive in the Bay with Scotty O
