= CBC Thunder Bay =

CBC Thunder Bay refers to:

- CBQT-FM, CBC Radio One on 88.3 FM
- CBQ-FM, CBC Radio 2 on 101.7 FM
- CBC Television was broadcast on a private affiliate, CKPR-TV on channel 2, until 2014. Since then, CBC has not been available over the air in Thunder Bay.

SRC Sudbury refers to:

- CBON-FM-20, Première Chaîne on 89.3 FM
- CBLFT-18, Télévision de Radio-Canada on channel 12, rebroadcasts CBLFT
