= CHSJ =

CHSJ may refer to:

- CHSJ-FM, a radio station (94.1 FM) licensed to Saint John, New Brunswick, Canada
- CBAT-TV, a television station (channel 4) licensed to Saint John, New Brunswick, Canada, which held the call sign CHSJ-TV from 1954 to 1994
