= New Brunswick Broadcasting Company =

Defunct Canadian media company

New Brunswick Broadcasting Company Limited
- Type: Private
- Industry: radio broadcasting 1934-2003 television broadcasting 1954-1994
- Founded: 1934; 92 years ago
- Defunct: 2003; 23 years ago - merged to form Acadia Broadcasting
- Headquarters: Saint John, New Brunswick, Canada

New Brunswick Broadcasting Company Limited was a Canadian media holding company based in Saint John, New Brunswick.

In 2003, NBBC merged with Acadian Broadcasting Company to form Acadia Broadcasting.

== History ==
New Brunswick Broadcasting was established in 1934 when Saint John Publishing purchased the Saint John radio station CFBO. Four local men who published the two major newspapers in Saint John, New Brunswick were the owners. Principal shareholder Howard P. Robinson was joined by J.D. McKenna, T.F. Drummie and L.W. Bewick. As directors they added the new division under the name New Brunswick Broadcasting at the same time as they changed the radio station call letters from CFBO to CHSJ.

In 1944, industrialist K.C. Irving purchased Saint John Publishing with its two major newspaper dailies from its principal shareholder, Howard P. Robinson. This media package sale included the radio station CHSJ controlled by New Brunswick Broadcasting. Later that year Irving incorporated all three media under the name New Brunswick Publishing Company. New Brunswick Broadcasting, under New Brunswick Publishing, looked after the radio station CHSJ.

In 1954, CHSJ-TV, the first television station in Atlantic Canada licensed by the Canadian Broadcasting Corporation (CBC), began broadcasting to the Saint John area. It was owned by New Brunswick Broadcasting and for many years its operations shared management, technical staff and some on-air people with CHSJ radio. For 40 years CHSJ-TV provided local news and programming in English to the province, and as an affiliate of CBC Television, it linked provincial viewers to national and international programs. CHSJ-TV was sold in 1994 to the CBC and recalled as CBAT.

In 1988, New Brunswick Broadcasting established a new television station in Dartmouth, Nova Scotia, CIHF-TV (branded as Maritime Independent Television, or MITV). It served the Halifax region and some of its programming was rebroadcast to CHSJ-TV stations in Moncton, Fredericton and Saint John. Later, with additional transmitters, its coverage of Nova Scotia reached 90 percent of the province. CIHF was sold in 1994 to CanWest Global Communications.

In 1989, New Brunswick Broadcasting bought radio station CKBW from Acadia Broadcasting Co. Ltd. in Bridgewater, Nova Scotia.

In 2003, New Brunswick Broadcasting Company Limited with Acadia Broadcasting Company Ltd. merged under the simpler name Acadia Broadcasting Limited.
