= Allan J. MacEachen Port Hawkesbury Airport =

Airport in Nova Scotia, Canada

Allan J. MacEachen Port Hawkesbury Airport Port Hawkesbury Airport
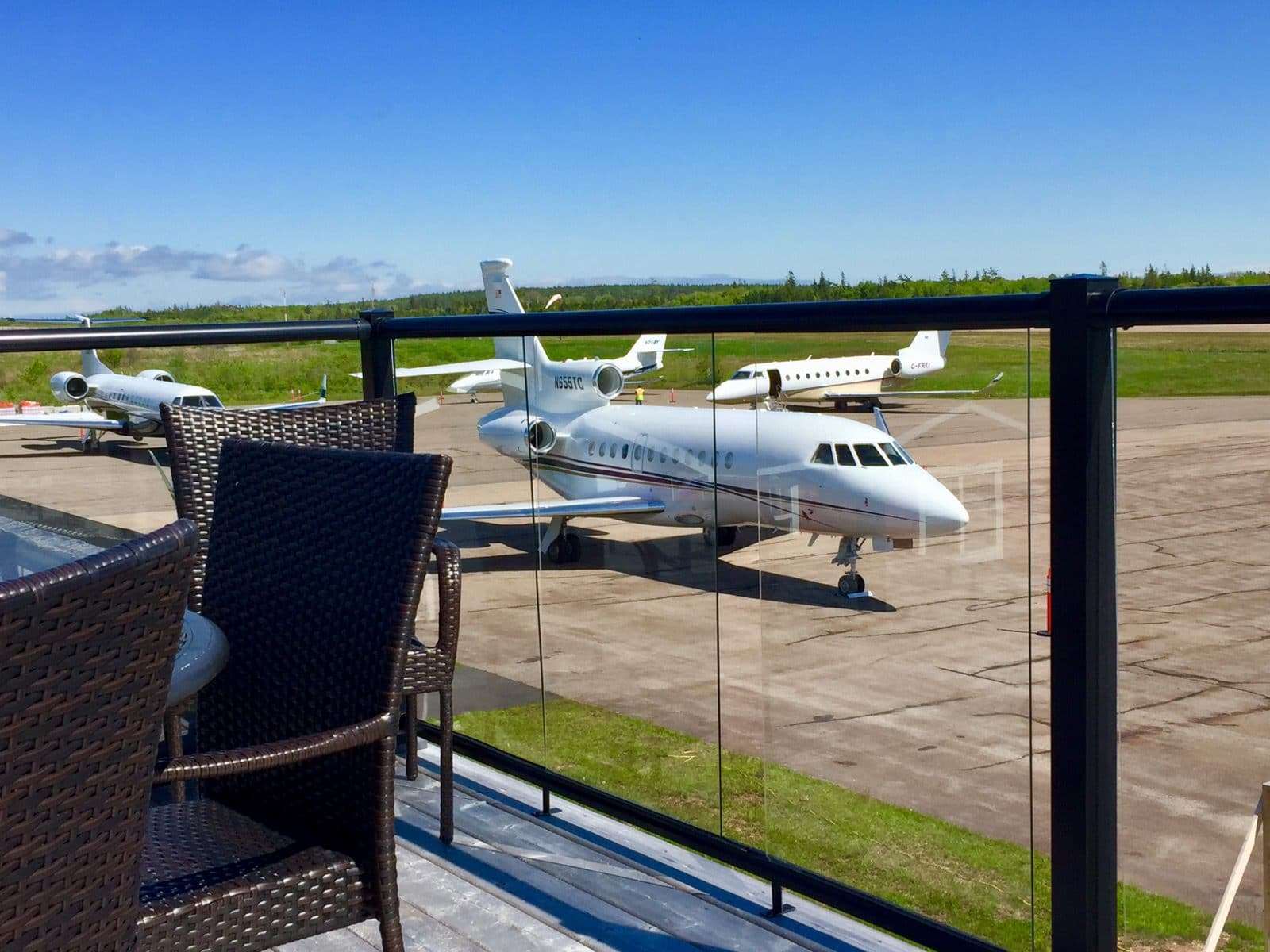
- IATA: YPS; ICAO: CYPD; WMO: 71041

Summary
- Airport type: Public
- Owner: Municipality of Port Hawkesbury
- Operator: Celtic Air Services
- Serves: Southern Cape Breton Island and the Strait area
- Location: Port Hawkesbury, Nova Scotia
- Time zone: AST (UTC−04:00)
  - Summer (DST): ADT (UTC−03:00)
- Elevation AMSL: 373 ft / 114 m
- Coordinates: 45°39′23″N 061°22′06″W
- Website: allanjairport.com

Map
- Location in Nova Scotia CYPD (Canada)

Runways
Direction	Length		Surface
Direction	ft	m	Surface
11/29	5,000	1,524	Asphalt
- Sources: Canada Flight Supplement; Environment Canada

Allan J. MacEachen Port Hawkesbury Airport (IATA: YPS, ICAO: CYPD) is a registered aerodrome located 2.1 nautical miles (3.9 km; 2.4 mi) north of Port Hawkesbury, Nova Scotia, Canada.

A short drive from the "gateway of Cape Breton Island" at the Canso Causeway, the airport is located near several tourist draws including the Cabot Links, fishing in the Margaree River as well as other tourist draws on Cape Breton Island and the eastern mainland of Nova Scotia.

== Services and infrastructure ==
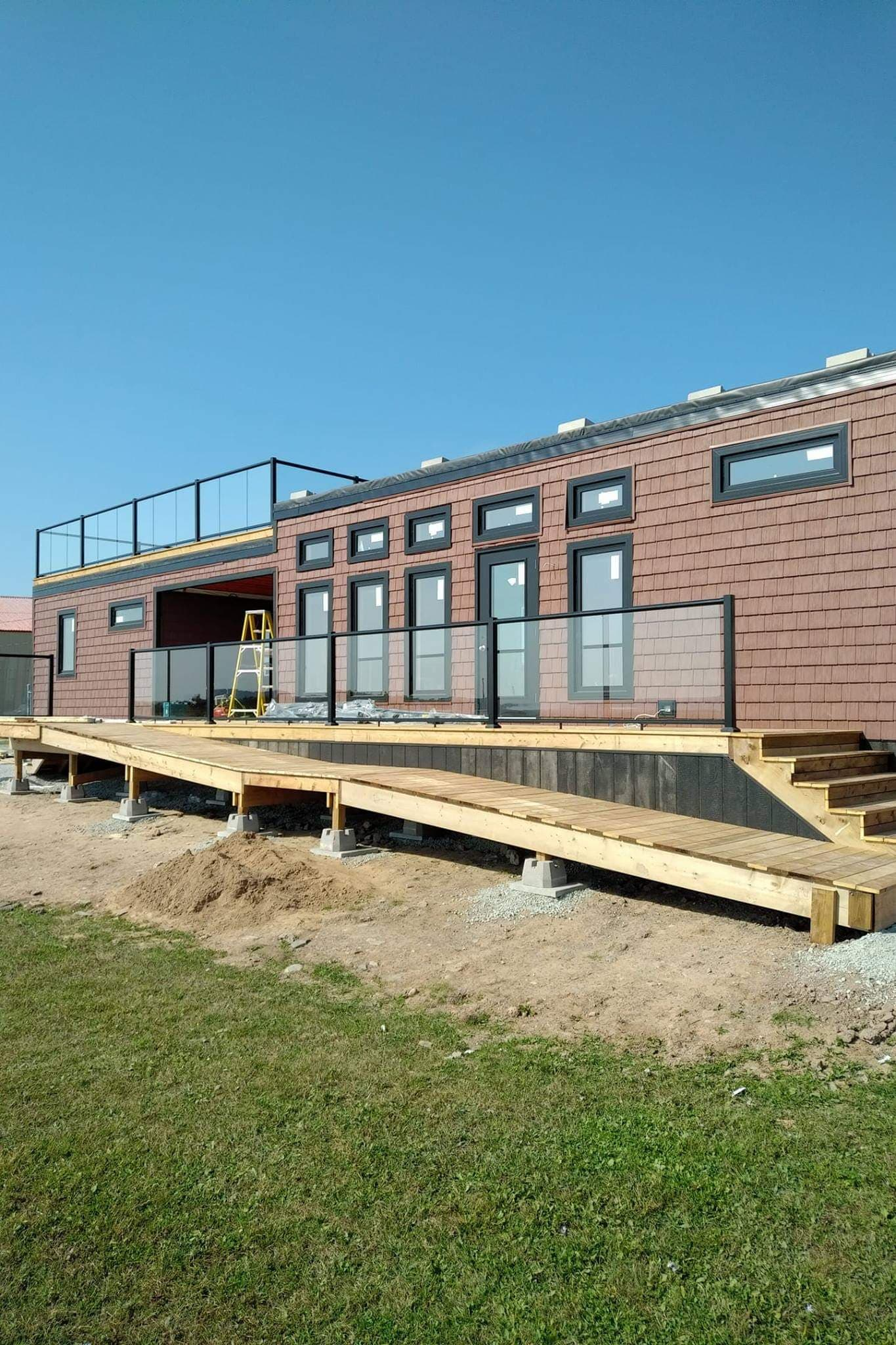
Passenger lounge under construction

While owned by the town of Port Hawksbury the airport has been operated under contract by Celtic Air Services starting July 2017. At the same time the Canada Flight Supplement still shows the Municipality of Port Hawkesbury as the operator and has not updated the name.

Services offered at the airport include aircraft parking and towing, aircraft servicing including fuel air conditioning, lavatory service, ground power and cabin grooming. The airport also provides an air conditioned executive lounge, opened in 2018.

== History ==
The airport is funded jointly by the Town of Port Hawkesbury, the Municipality of the County of Inverness and the Municipality of the County of Richmond.

Starting in 2011 the airport began to benefit from increased use due to flights arriving to access the new Cabot Links and then Cabot Cliffs golf course in Inverness. Flight volume increased a reported 4,000 percent over the first six years, which in turn led to contracting out the operations of the airport to Celtic Air Services in July 2017.

In December 2017 the Port Hawkesbury town council voted unanimously to rename the airport after Allan J. MacEachen, the former Deputy Prime Minister and MP for Inverness—Richmond and later Cape Breton Highlands—Canso.

In May 2018 Airshow Cape Breton was held at the airport, and featured the Royal Canadian Air Force Snowbirds.

== Cabot Links controversy ==
In June 2019, the Federal government indicated that funding would possibly be made available to build a private airfield at Cabot Links. The mayor of Port Hawkesbury and the airport operator raised concern that such an investment would jeopardize the operating of the airport, and that the airport could not survive if it lost the current private jet traffic to a new airport. Mayor Brenda Chisholm-Beaton called on Prime Minister Justin Trudeau and Premier Stephen McNeil to reconsider funding the project, stating that "two airports within an hour’s drive just doesn’t make sustainable economic sense."
