= Askilton =

Community in Nova Scotia, Canada

Coordinates: 45°41′40″N 61°18′24″W

Askilton is an unincorporated community in the Canadian province of Nova Scotia, located in Inverness County. Situated roughly 8 kilometres northeast of Port Hawkesbury, the community had a school, chapel, and glebe house by 1875. Askilton is thought to be named in honour of Donald McAskill, who was postmaster there in 1865. Before it received this name, it was known as River Inhabitants. Askilton had a population of 100 people in 1898.
