= CJHK-FM =

Radio station in Bridgewater, Nova Scotia

Coordinates: 44°23′17″N 64°40′44″W

- Bridgewater, Nova Scotia; Canada
- Broadcast area: Lunenburg County
- Frequency: 100.7 MHz
- Branding: Country 100.7

Programming
- Format: Country

Ownership
- Owner: Acadia Broadcasting; (Ocean Capital Investments NB Limited)
- Sister stations: CKBW-FM

History
- First air date: July 22, 2010
- Call sign meaning: Initial "Hank" branding

Technical information
- ERP: 10,000 watts

Links
- Website: yoursouthshore.ca

CJHK-FM is a Canadian radio station broadcasting a country format at 100.7 FM in Bridgewater, Nova Scotia. CJHK is located in the Canada Post building, along with sister station CKBW-FM.

Both stations are owned & operated by Acadia Broadcasting.

== History ==
The station received CRTC approval to operate at 100.7 FM on April 24, 2009, and began broadcasting on July 22, 2010, as 100.7 Hank FM with a country format.

On September 29, 2014, CJHK was rebranded to Country 100.7, but kept the same format.
