= CKQV-FM =

Radio station in Vermilion Bay, Ontario

Coordinates: 49°50′37″N 93°26′27″W

- Vermilion Bay, Ontario; Canada
- Broadcast area: Kenora District
- Frequency: 103.3 MHz
- Branding: Q104

Programming
- Format: Classic hits

Ownership
- Owner: Acadia Broadcasting
- Sister stations: CJRL-FM

History
- First air date: November 22, 2004

Technical information
- Class: A
- ERP: 1,600 watts
- HAAT: 153.3 metres (503 ft)

Links
- Webcast: Listen Live
- Website: yourkenora.ca

CKQV-FM (103.3 FM, Q104) is a radio station in Vermilion Bay, Ontario. Owned by Acadia Broadcasting, it broadcasts a classic hits format serving the Kenora District of Northwestern Ontario. The station's main studio and transmitter are located in Vermilion Bay, with repeaters in Kenora, Dryden and Sioux Lookout from which it derives its branding.

== History ==
On April 13, 2004, Norwesto Communications received approval from the Canadian Radio-television and Telecommunications Commission (CRTC) to operate a new FM radio station at Vermilion Bay along with repeaters.

The station launched on November 22, 2004 with a hot adult contemporary format.

On September 1, 2010, CKQV was sold to Golden West Broadcasting—which primarily operates stations in Western Canada—giving it its first station in Ontario. The station later flipped to a classic hits format.

In March 2022, Golden West announced the sale of CKQV to Acadia Broadcasting pending CRTC approval, making it a sister station to CJRL-FM.

== Rebroadcasters ==
Rebroadcasters of CKQV-FM
| City of licence | Identifier | Frequency | Power | Class | RECNet | CRTC Decision |
|---|---|---|---|---|---|---|
| Dryden | CKQV-FM-1 | 104.3 FM | 1,800 watts | A | Query | |
| Kenora | CKQV-FM-2 | 104.5 FM | 1,700 watts | A | Query | |
| Sioux Lookout | CKQV-FM-3 | 104.5 FM | 50 watts | LP | Query | |

On January 29, 2010, Norwesto received approval to change the frequency of CKQV-FM-3 104.5 to 104.1 MHz.

On May 7, 2012, Golden West applied to change the frequency of CKQV-FM-1 104.5 to 104.3 MHz. This is due to ongoing interference with the 104.5 signal from associated repeater CKQV-FM-2 in Kenora as received in the Vermilion Bay area. This proposed frequency change eliminates that interference. The CRTC approved Golden West's application on October 1, 2012.
