= CBD-FM =

Radio station in Saint John, New Brunswick, Canada

- Saint John, New Brunswick; Canada
- Broadcast area: Southwestern New Brunswick
- Frequency: 91.3 MHz

Programming
- Format: News/Talk
- Network: CBC Radio One

Ownership
- Owner: Canadian Broadcasting Corporation

History
- First air date: October 15, 1964
- Former frequencies: 1110 kHz (1964–1988)
- Call sign meaning: Canadian Broadcasting Corporation D

Technical information
- Licensing authority: CRTC
- Class: C
- ERP: 88,960 watts (horiz.); 22,243 watts (vert.)
- HAAT: 374.6 metres (1,229 ft)
- Transmitter coordinates: 45.4775°N 66.2331°W

Links
- Website: CBC New Brunswick

CBD-FM (91.3 MHz) is a non-commercial public radio station in Saint John, New Brunswick. It is the local Radio One station of the Canadian Broadcasting Corporation and is owned by the Canadian government. The studios are on King Street in Saint John.

It is a Class C station, with an effective radiated power (ERP) of 88,960 watts horizontal and 22,243 watts vertical. The tower is at a height above average terrain (HAAT) of 374.6 metres (1,229 ft). The transmitter is on Mount Champlain in Petersville Parish, New Brunswick. Even though Fredericton has its own CBC Radio One station, CBZF-FM 99.5 FM, CBD-FM can easily be heard in the provincial capital.

== History ==
Former Radio One Saint John logo prior to 2007.

CBD was launched on October 15, 1964. It originally broadcast on 1110 AM. Prior to its launch, CBC Radio programming was aired on private network affiliate CHSJ 890 AM.

The CBC began converting many of its stations to FM in the 1980s. A CBD simulcast on 91.3 FM began on May 13, 1981. The AM transmitter was shut down in September 1988, leaving programming only on the FM dial.

== Local programming ==
On weekday mornings, CBD-FM produces the Saint John-focused news and current-affairs program, Information Morning Saint John. The weekday afternoon drive time program is Shift, which is broadcast on CBC Radio One stations around New Brunswick.

== Notable Staff ==
=== Current ===
- Rachel Cave - Host of Information Morning Saint John
- Sarah Trainor - Morning news reader, CBC News
- Cindy Grant - Technical Director
- Megan MacAlpine - Associate Producer, Information Morning
- Steven Webb - Producer/Editor, CBC News
- Rachel Cave - CBC News
- Colin McPhail - CBC News
- Robert Jones - CBC News
- Connell Smith - CBC News
- Bobbi-Jean MacKinnon - CBC News
- Peter Anawati - CBC News
- Grahame Thompson - CBC News
- Roger Cosman - CBC News

=== Former ===
- Eleanor Austin, CBC Radio 1982–96; Producer of Rolling Home Show & Mainstreet, Writer-Broadcaster on Information Morning
- Nancy Watson, Producer of Rolling Home Show
- Susan Lambert, Information Morning Producer, Executive Producer
- Sandy Lumsden, Founding Executive Producer of CBD
- Roy Geldart, newsreader for/co-host of Information Morning (now retired)
- Julia Wright, former host of Information Morning
- Hance Colburne, former host of Information Morning
- Costas Halavrezos, former host of The Rolling Home Show
- Jeff Collins, former host with above, then host at CBC Calgary (now retired)
- Stan Carew (went on to host of Weekend Mornings, produced at CBHA-FM Halifax, died on July 6, 2015)
- Brent Bambury (currently host of Day 6 on CBC Radio One)
- Harvey MacLeod, producer of MainStreet and The Rolling Home Show (now retired)
- Gary Mittelholtz, reporter/host of MainStreet and The Rolling Home Show (died on March 15, 2010)
- Jo-Ann Roberts, host/reporter (now at CBCV-FM Victoria)
- Christiane Vianncourt, host of Information Morning (now with Rogers Cable)
- Paul Castle, former host of Information Morning and Mainstreet/Shift

== Rebroadcasters ==
Rebroadcasters of CBD-FM
City of licence	Identifier	Frequency	RECNet	Notes
St. Stephen	CBD-FM-1	106.3 FM	Query	45°11′33″N 67°15′39.96″W
Grand Manan	CBZA-FM	103.7 FM	Query	44°42′37.08″N 66°44′43.08″W

On June 11, 2013, the CBC submitted an application to the CRTC to convert CBAO 990 to 88.1 FM; this application was approved on November 6, 2013. On July 3, 2014, the CBC received approval from the CRTC to change CBD-FM-1's frequency to 106.3.
