= CIGO-FM =

Radio station in Port Hawkesbury, Nova Scotia

Coordinates: 45°39′00″N 61°27′57″W

- Port Hawkesbury, Nova Scotia; Canada
- Broadcast area: Cape Breton Island
- Frequency: 101.5 MHz
- Branding: 101.5 The Hawk

Programming
- Format: Top 40/CHR
- Affiliations: Premiere Networks

Ownership
- Owner: Acadia Broadcasting

History
- First air date: October 29, 1975
- Former frequencies: 1410 kHz (1975–2000)

Technical information
- Class: B
- ERP: horizontal polarization only: 38,100 watts
- HAAT: 171.1 metres (561 ft)

Links
- Webcast: Listen Live
- Website: 1015thehawk.com

CIGO-FM is a Canadian radio station, broadcasting in Port Hawkesbury, Nova Scotia at 101.5 FM. The station plays a contemporary hit radio format branded as "101.5 The Hawk".

== History ==
On April 4, 1975, the CRTC approved an application by Gérald J. Doucet on behalf of a company to be incorporated (OBCI) to operate a new an English language AM radio station at Port Hawkesbury, Nova Scotia on the frequency 1410 kHz, with a power of 10,000 watts day and night with a directional antenna.

CIGO started as an AM station at 1410 kHz. Founded by Gerald Doucet, it first went on the air on October 29, 1975. In November 1999, CIGO received CRTC approval to convert to FM. In 2000, CIGO switched over to FM and the AM signal was shut down permanently shortly afterwards. As an AM station, it was known as 1410 CIGO.

The station's primary coverage area is Inverness, Richmond, Antigonish and Guysborough counties, but it can be heard beyond that area.

On June 8, 2010, MacEachern Broadcasting Limited (CIGO-FM) applied to increase their ERP (effective radiated power) from 19,000 to 40,000 watts and received CRTC approval on September 17, 2010.

CIGO is owned and operated by Acadia Broadcasting.
