= CKNI-FM =

Radio station in Moncton

Coordinates: 46°08′41″N 64°54′11″W

- Moncton, New Brunswick; Canada
- Broadcast area: Greater Moncton
- Frequency: 91.9 MHz
- Branding: 91.9 The Bend

Programming
- Format: Adult contemporary

Ownership
- Owner: Acadia Broadcasting

History
- First air date: October 11, 2005
- Call sign meaning: News and Information, from original format

Technical information
- Class: C
- ERP: 29.5 kW (vertical); 70 kW (horizontal)
- HAAT: 211 metres (692 ft)

Links
- Webcast: Listen Live
- Website: 919thebend.ca

CKNI-FM is a Canadian radio station broadcasting on 91.9 FM in Moncton, New Brunswick. Owned by Acadia Broadcasting, the station broadcasts an adult contemporary format branded as 91.9 The Bend. CKNI's studios and offices are located at Jones Lake Place on Main Street in Moncton.

== History ==
On November 26, 2004, Rogers Media received CRTC approval to operate a new English-language commercial FM news/talk radio station at 91.9 FM in Moncton, New Brunswick. CKNI's first broadcast was on October 11, 2005 with studios located on Assomption Boulevard in downtown Moncton. CKNI was networked with sister stations CHNI-FM in Saint John (which has since been sold to Newcap Radio and flipped to a rock format in July 2014), and CJNI-FM in Halifax (which shut down in July 2026). Broadcasts included the national award-winning morning news/talk show The Morning News with Allan Dearing and Tara Clow from 6 to 10am weekdays. CKNI also broadcast Moncton Wildcats, Ottawa Senators and Toronto Blue Jays games.

On March 31, 2014, CKNI was sold to Acadia Broadcasting. On August 8, 2014, CKNI flipped to adult contemporary, branded as 91.9 The Bend.
