= CKHY-FM =

Radio station in Dartmouth, Nova Scotia

Coordinates: 44°38′47″N 63°39′37″W

- Dartmouth, Nova Scotia; Canada
- Broadcast area: Halifax Regional Municipality
- Frequency: 105.1 MHz
- Branding: Surge 105

Programming
- Format: Active rock

Ownership
- Owner: Acadia Broadcasting
- Sister stations: CKHZ-FM

History
- First air date: October 1, 2010

Technical information
- Power: 100,000 watts
- HAAT: 185.1 metres (607 ft)

Links
- Webcast: Listen live
- Website: surge1051.com

CKHY-FM is a radio station in Dartmouth, Nova Scotia. Owned by Acadia Broadcasting, it broadcasts an active rock format branded as Surge 105.1. CKHY's studios are located on Main Street in Dartmouth, while its transmitter is located on Washmill Lake Drive in Clayton Park.

== History ==
The station received CRTC approval on October 7, 2009 and officially launched on October 1, 2010, as Live 105, under the ownership of Evanov Radio Group. The station had been airing a modern rock format since its inception. In 2016, the station shifted to active rock and adopted a new slogan "Halifax's Best Rock" but kept the "Live" branding. On August 10, 2018, the station rebranded to Rock 105.1 and began to include more classic rock and hard rock music to its playlist eventually moving towards a mainstream rock format to more effectively compete with Stingray's heritage rock radio station CFRQ-FM.

On January 15, 2019, at 7:00 p.m., CKHY abruptly flipped to soft adult contemporary and rebranded to Jewel 105, launching with the adult standards/smooth jazz show The Lounge (an evening program on all of Evanov's Jewel-branded stations), and adding the John Tesh Radio Show at middays. The move pre-empted an announced switch to the same format by rival station CKUL-FM, which launched two days later on January 17.

In July 2020, Evanov announced the sale of its Halifax stations to Acadia Broadcasting. The sale received CRTC approval on April 26, 2021. On July 19, 2021, Acadia dropped the Jewel format and returned to active rock as Surge 105.
