= Acadia Broadcasting =

Canadian radio broadcasting network

Acadia Broadcasting Limited
- Type: Private
- Country: Canada
- Broadcast area: New Brunswick, Nova Scotia, Northwestern Ontario
- Headquarters: 58 King Street, Saint John, New Brunswick, Canada

Programming
- Languages: English, French

Ownership
- Owner: Ocean Capital Investments
- Key people: John K F Irving (president)

History
- Launch date: 1928 (New Brunswick Broadcasting Company), 1947 (Acadia Broadcasting Co. Limited)
- Replaced: New Brunswick Broadcasting Company, Acadia Broadcasting Co. Limited

Coverage
- Stations: CKBW-FM, CHSJ-FM, +13 others

Links
- Website: acadiabroadcasting.ca

Acadia Broadcasting Limited is a Canadian radio broadcasting network that operates five FM radio stations in Northwestern Ontario and 10 in the Atlantic Canadian provinces of New Brunswick and Nova Scotia. It is owned by Ocean Capital Investments which is considered a part of the Irving Group of Companies. It is headquartered at 58 King Street in Saint John, New Brunswick. The company was formed by a 2001 operations merger between the Saint John based New Brunswick Broadcasting Company and the Bridgewater, Nova Scotia based Acadia Broadcasting Co. Limited. In 2003, the merged companies began operating under the simpler shared name, Acadia Broadcasting Limited. Since the merger, Acadia Broadcasting has launched new stations and acquired several stations owned and operated by other broadcasters throughout the provinces of Nova Scotia, New Brunswick and Ontario. Acadia Broadcasting radio stations attract a monthly average of over 400,000 listeners, and their websites see 5.3 million pageviews over the same period. Their markets are reached by an average of 8,400 advertising clients.

== History ==
In 1928, CFBO was launched by C.A. Monro Limited. Mr. Monro had obtained a private commercial broadcasting license from the Department of Marine and Fisheries of the Dominion of Canada in Ottawa, dated April 1, 1928, for the purpose of setting up and operating an AM radio station of only 50 watts in Saint John, New Brunswick. This was radio license No. 23 issued in Canada.

In 1934, four newspaper publishing shareholders in Saint John, New Brunswick- Howard P. Robinson, J.D. McKenna, T.F. Drummie, and L.W. Bewick - purchased the station CFBO from C.A. Monro. Overnight, the station's new callsign became CHSJ, and it broadcast out of a new modern studio with new experienced management. Operated by Saint John Publishing Co. Limited, CHSJ soon became an affiliate of CBC Radio's Trans-Canada Network, an important link in the development of the national network.

In 1944, Kenneth C. Irving purchased Saint John Publishing Company Limited from its principal shareholder, Howard P. Robinson. With this purchase, Irving acquired both the radio station CHSJ and the two local newspapers. Later that year, the company name was changed to New Brunswick Publishing Company Limited and its subsidiary New Brunswick Broadcasting was responsible for CHSJ radio.

In 1989, New Brunswick Broadcasting purchased Acadia Broadcasting, CKBW in Bridgewater, Nova Scotia from the retiring shareholders.

In 2001, New Brunswick Broadcasting launched two new radio stations in New Brunswick, CHWV-FM in Saint John, New Brunswick and CHTD-FM in St. Stephen, New Brunswick.

In 2003, New Brunswick Broadcasting was folded into Acadia Broadcasting.

In May 2007, Acadia Broadcasting Limited acquired three radio stations in northern Ontario: CKDR-FM in Dryden, CJRL-FM in Kenora, and CFOB-FM in Fort Frances. Through a series of repeaters, CKDR-FM in Dryden also serves six other northern communities: Sioux Lookout, Hudson, Ear Falls, Red Lake, Atikokan, and Ignace.

In January 2010, Acadia acquired CJUK-FM and CKTG-FM in Thunder Bay, Ontario from Newcap Radio. On July 22, 2010, Acadia Broadcasting launched CJHK-FM in Bridgewater, Nova Scotia.

In March 2014, Acadia Broadcasting acquired CKNI-FM in Moncton, New Brunswick from Rogers Media.

In April 2016, Acadia acquired CJLS-FM in Yarmouth, Nova Scotia from Ray Zinck and Chris Perry.

On July 13, 2020, Evanov Radio Group announced its intent to sell CKHZ-FM and CKHY-FM in Halifax to Acadia.

In July 2023, Acadia Broadcasting shut down Huddle, an online business publication based in Saint John, New Brunswick which it had purchased in 2019.

== Stations operated by Acadia Broadcasting ==
Radio stations owned and operated by Acadia Broadcasting Limited as of December 12, 2024

City of licence	Call sign	Frequency	On-air branding	First air date	Format	Website
Bridgewater, Nova Scotia	CKBW-FM	98.1 FM	CKBW	December 27, 1947 (AM); 2001 (FM)	Classic hits	ckbw.ca
Bridgewater, Nova Scotia	CJHK-FM	100.7 FM	Country 100.7	July 22, 2010	Country	cjhk.ca
Dartmouth, Nova Scotia	CKHY-FM	105.1 FM	Surge 105	October 1, 2010	Active rock	surge105.ca
Dryden, Ontario	CKDR-FM	92.7 FM	CKDR	August 1963	Adult contemporary	ckdr.net
Fort Frances, Ontario	CFOB-FM	93.1 FM	93.1 The Border	1944 (AM); 2002 (FM)	Classic hits	931theborder.ca
Dartmouth, Nova Scotia	CKHZ-FM	103.5 FM	Country 103.5	June 28, 2006	Country	hotcountry1035.com
Kenora, Ontario	CJRL-FM	89.5 FM	89.5 The Lake	1938 (AM); November 2004 (FM)	Adult contemporary	kenoraonline.com
Moncton, New Brunswick	CKNI-FM	91.9 FM	91.9 The Bend	October 11, 2005	Adult contemporary	919thebend.ca
Port Hawkesbury, Nova Scotia	CIGO-FM	101.5 FM	101.5 The Hawk	October 29, 1975	Contemporary hit radio	1015thehawk.com
Saint John, New Brunswick	CHSJ-FM	94.1 FM	Country 94	March 1928 (AM); 1998 (FM)	Country	country94.ca
Saint John, New Brunswick	CHWV-FM	97.3 FM	97.3 The Wave	February 19, 2001	Hot adult contemporary	thewave.ca
St. Stephen, New Brunswick	CHTD-FM	98.1 FM	98.1 Charlotte FM	May 28, 2001	Classic hits	charlottefm.ca
Thunder Bay, Ontario	CKTG-FM	105.3 FM	Country 105	September 3, 1944 (AM); 1996 (FM)	Country	country1053.ca
Thunder Bay, Ontario	CJUK-FM	99.9 FM	99.9 The Bay	August 2001	Classic hits	999thebay.ca
Vermilion Bay, Ontario	CKQV-FM	104.5 FM	Q104	November 2004	Classic hits	kenoraonline.com
Yarmouth, Nova Scotia	CJLS-FM	95.5 FM	Y95	April 1, 1934	Classic hits	cjls.com

== See also ==
- List of radio stations in New Brunswick
- List of radio stations in Nova Scotia
- List of radio stations in Ontario
