= CKHZ-FM =

Radio station in Halifax, Nova Scotia

Coordinates: 44°38′47″N 63°39′37″W

- Halifax, Nova Scotia; Canada
- Broadcast area: Halifax Regional Municipality
- Frequency: 103.5 MHz
- Branding: Country 103.5

Programming
- Format: Country
- Affiliations: Premiere Networks (Bobby Bones Show)

Ownership
- Owner: Acadia Broadcasting
- Sister stations: CKHY-FM

History
- First air date: June 28, 2006
- Call sign meaning: Halifax Z (former branding)

Technical information
- Class: C
- ERP: 100,000 watts
- HAAT: 185.1 metres (607 ft)

Links
- Webcast: Listen Live
- Website: hotcountry1035.com

CKHZ-FM (103.5 FM, Country 103.5) is a radio station in Dartmouth, Nova Scotia serving the Halifax Regional Municipality. Owned by Acadia Broadcasting, it broadcasts a country format. CKHZ's studios are located on Main Street in Dartmouth, while its transmitter is located on Washmill Lake Drive in Clayton Park.

== History ==
CKHZ occupies the 103.5 FM frequency that was once Halifax's home to the all-news radio network CKO, which began broadcasting in several major Canadian cities, including Halifax, in 1985. In 1989, CKO ceased broadcasting. The frequency remained dark until 2006. In 2003, the Canadian Radio-television and Telecommunications Commission (CRTC) awarded the vacant frequency license to Evanov. On November 26, 2004, CKMW Radio Ltd., a subsidiary of Evanov, received CRTC approval to operate on 103.5 MHz. After several days of fine tuning it began on-air testing on June 28, 2006. The official sign-on date of the new station was August 14, 2006.

On August 14, 2006, the station officially launched as the rhythmic contemporary station Z103.5; its branding and format was modelled upon Orangeville, Ontario sister station CIDC-FM, with a dance-oriented presentation. In 2009, the station segued to a mainstream Top 40/CHR format, and rebranded as Z103 the following year. On January 6, 2012, the station re-launched as Energy 103.5 (with its branding modelled upon CHWE-FM in Winnipeg), returning once again to a rhythmic, dance-oriented presentation.

On March 4, 2013, CKHZ transitioned to hot adult contemporary while maintaining the "Energy" branding, but returned once again to a mainstream CHR format later in the year. On February 12, 2014, after continued low ratings against rival Top 40 station CJCH-FM, CKHZ transitioned back to Hot AC, although promoting itself with a larger focus on classic hits from the 1990s and 2000s.

Logo as "Hot Country 103.5" used from 2015–2026

The new format continued to perform poorly, with CKHZ only holding a 1.9 share in Numeris ratings. On September 3, 2015 after playing "Bye Bye Bye" by NSYNC, CKHZ flipped to country, branded as Hot Country 103.5. The first song on "Hot Country" was "This Is How We Roll" by Florida-Georgia Line. CKHZ's general manager, Trevor Romkey, explained that unlike its new competitor, CHFX-FM (which, in comparison, had a 11.4 share and was the second-place station in the market), the station would focus more on newer songs.

On July 13, 2020, Evanov Radio Group announced it was selling CKHZ and CKHY-FM to Acadia Broadcasting. The sale received CRTC approval on April 26, 2021. On March 23, 2026, Acadia Broadcasting relaunched the station as Country 103.5, adjusting its playlist to include more classic songs, and revamping its weekday schedule to feature locally-produced shows.
