= CHFD-DT =

Television station in Thunder Bay

- Thunder Bay, Ontario; Canada
- Channels: Digital: 4 (VHF); Virtual: 4
- Branding: Global Thunder Bay; Global News at Noon (newscast simulcast with CIII-DT)

Programming
- Affiliations: 4.4: Global

Ownership
- Owner: Dougall Media; (Thunder Bay Electronics Ltd.)
- Sister stations: CKPR-DT, CKPR-FM, CFNO-FM, CJSD-FM

History
- First air date: October 14, 1972
- Former call signs: CHFD-TV (1972–2011)
- Former channel numbers: Analog: 4 (VHF, 1972–2011); Translator: CKAR-TV 8 Armstrong (0.01 kW)
- Former affiliations: CTV (1972–2010)
- Call sign meaning: Hector Fraser Dougall

Technical information
- Licensing authority: CRTC
- ERP: 1.2 kW
- HAAT: 366.2 m (1,201 ft)
- Transmitter coordinates: 48°31′25″N 89°6′55″W

Links
- Website: globalthunderbay.tbtv.com

CHFD-DT (channel 4) is a television station in Thunder Bay, Ontario, Canada, affiliated with the Global Television Network. It is owned by locally based Dougall Media alongside CTV affiliate CKPR-DT (channel 2). Both stations share studios on Hill and Van Norman Streets in central Thunder Bay, while CHFD-DT's transmitter is located in Shuniah, Ontario.

Since February 12, 2010, CHFD carries the vast majority of Global's programming schedule and brands itself on-air as Global Thunder Bay in the manner of the network's owned-and-operated stations.

== History ==
=== As a CTV affiliate ===
CHFD went on the air for the first time on October 14, 1972, as a CTV affiliate. The station is part of the Thunder Bay Television twinstick with the then-CBC affiliate CKPR. From 2002 to 2009, it was among three CTV-affiliated stations in Canada not owned and operated directly by CTV.

As a CTV affiliate, CHFD also aired selected programming purchased from Global, such as Saturday Night Live and Brothers & Sisters, as well as religious programming commonly aired on Global stations, including 100 Huntley Street and the Hour of Power. It has also aired programs which do not air on other broadcast channels in Canada, such as Channel 4's A Place in the Sun.

=== Affiliation with the Global Television Network ===
Former logo used when CHFD was a CTV affiliate. It continued to be used on sister station CKPR until 2012.

In January 2010, the Canadian Radio-television and Telecommunications Commission (CRTC) published an application filed by CHFD to disaffiliate from CTV as of February 28, after not being able to negotiate an acceptable new programming agreement with the network, indicating it had instead reached an expanded program supply agreement with Global. However, on February 12, just before CTV's coverage of the 2010 Winter Olympics began, and before the CRTC was able to rule on the application, CHFD began carrying Global programming full-time. It had attempted to get broadcast rights for the Olympics—which the station said was a separate matter from the network affiliation—but was again unable to reach an acceptable agreement. After affiliating with Global, CHFD rebranded from Thunder Bay Television to Global Thunder Bay, and adopted a new logo and website similar to Global's owned and operated stations (this differs from most Canadian television stations that are not under common ownership with a television system or national television network; such stations typically use their callsigns as their on-air branding).

Local cable company Shaw Cable advised customers who wish to continue to watch CTV programming to subscribe to their digital cable timeshifting package; the company did, however, add CTV Toronto to its basic lineup on channel 23 for the duration of the Olympics.

In June 2014, Dougall Media announced that sister station CKPR would switch its affiliation from CBC to CTV in September. The affiliation switch took effect on September 1, 2014.

On January 27, 2016, Dougall Media officials revealed that CKPR and CHFD are both being sustained by the payouts from life insurance policies on former owner Fraser Dougall and a former general manager who both died in 2015, and said that the stations were likely to shut down by September 1, barring a favourable change in CRTC policies on local television funding. Both stations, however, are still in operation.

== Programming ==
Currently the station clears the majority of Global programming, with some preemptions in the daytime schedule for a local morning newscast at 9 a.m. and infomercials as well as the weekend edition of Global National since fall 2011.

Locally produced programs include Officially Rugged, TB Classifieds, and the nightly Headline News (no relation to the CNN-owned channel). CHFD also airs a Saturday evening newscast and repeats CKPR's 11 p.m. TB News Late Edition at 11:30 on weeknights, along with a simulcast of Global Toronto's Global News Morning on weekday mornings from 6–9 a.m., and also News at Noon on weekday noon at 12–12:30 p.m.

== Technical information ==
=== Subchannels ===
Subchannel of CHFD-DT
Subchannel	Res.	Short name	Programming
4.4	1080i	CHFD-DT	Global

=== Analog-to-digital conversion ===
CHFD-DT flash cut to digital in early August 2011 alongside sister station CKPR.

Through the use of PSIP, digital television receivers display CHFD-DT's virtual channel as 4.1.

In January 2011, Dougall Media applied with the CRTC to broadcast its digital signal instead on channel 4.

=== Rebroadcasters ===
CHFD-TV had operated an analog rebroadcaster in Armstrong (CKAR-TV, channel 8). It is believed that the Armstrong transmitter had been shut down as there are little or no sources and references from the CRTC, historical information and technical databases regarding this rebroadcast transmitter. On February 18, 1993, Armstrong Resources Development Corporation submitted an application to the CRTC to operate a television rebroadcast transmitter at Armstrong on channel 7 with a power of 10 watts, to retransmit the signal of CHFD-TV in Thunder Bay.
