= CFNO-FM =

Radio station in Marathon, Ontario, Canada

Coordinates: 48°45′13″N 86°35′08″W

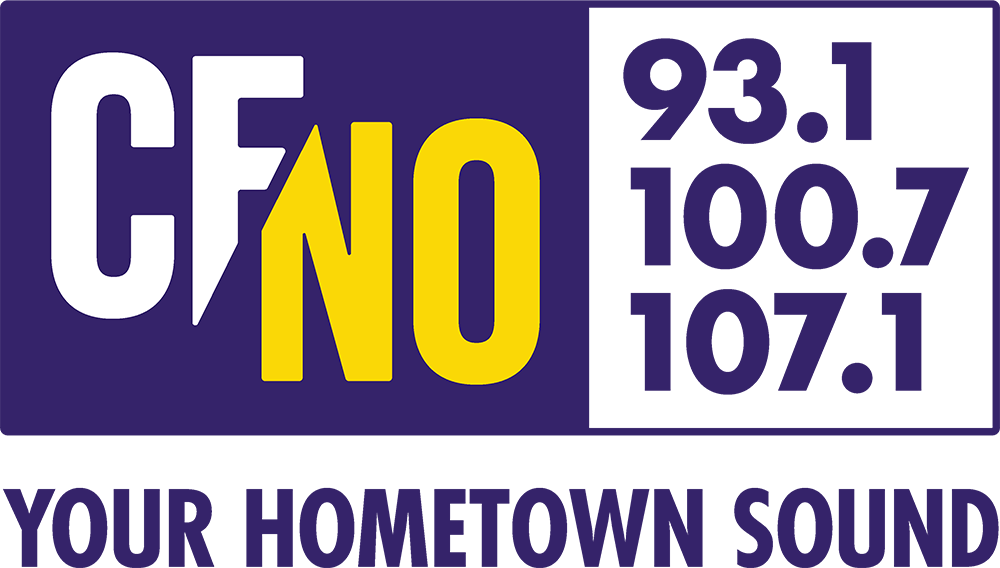
- Marathon, Ontario; Canada
- Broadcast area: Northwestern Ontario
- Frequency: 93.1 MHz
- Branding: CFNO Your Hometown Sound

Programming
- Format: Adult contemporary

Ownership
- Owner: Dougall Media; (North Superior Broadcasting, Ltd.)
- Sister stations: CKPR-FM, CJSD-FM, CKPR-DT, CHFD-DT

History
- First air date: 1982
- Call sign meaning: Northwestern Ontario

Technical information
- Class: C
- ERP: 50 kW
- HAAT: 265 metres (869 ft)
- Repeater: see article

Links
- Webcast: Listen Live
- Website: cfno.fm

CFNO-FM is a Canadian radio station that broadcasts at 93.1 FM in Marathon, Ontario. The station broadcasts an adult contemporary format with the brand name CFNO Your Hometown Sound.

The station was launched in 1982 by North Superior Broadcasting. It was acquired by Dougall Media in 2002.

== Rebroadcasters ==
CFNO serves a large portion of Northwestern Ontario through a network of rebroadcast transmitters.

Rebroadcasters of CFNO-FM
City of licence	Identifier	Frequency	RECNet	CRTC Decision
Beardmore	CFNO-FM-3	107.1 FM	Query	Broadcasting Decision CRTC 2014-53
Geraldton	CFNO-FM-4	100.7 FM	Query	Decision CRTC 98-164
Hornepayne	CFNO-FM-2	107.1 FM	Query	Decision CRTC 86-730
Longlac	CFNO-FM-5	107.1 FM	Query	Decision CRTC 86-731
Nakina	CFNO-FM-7	107.1 FM	Query	Broadcasting Decision CRTC 2002-253
Nipigon	CFNO-FM-1	100.7 FM	Query	
White River	CFNO-FM-8	100.7 FM	Query	

In 1986, CFNO received approval to add a transmitter at Nipigon/Red Rock at 103.7 MHz. However, the station was advised to seek another frequency for the rebroadcaster instead. CFNO-FM eventually established a transmitter in Nipigon at 100.7 MHz.

In 1988, CFNO received approval to add a transmitter, CFNO-FM-6, at Dubreuilville at 93.9 MHz. In 2004, the station was authorized to delete CFNO-FM-6 as that transmitter was no longer required, for reasons unknown.

On October 25, 2013, Dougall Media submitted an application to operate a new FM transmitter in Beardmore (CFNO-FM-3) at 107.1 MHz. The transmitter was approved on February 12, 2014.

On October 6, 2015, the CRTC approved changes to the authorized contours of CFNO-FM-2, by increasing the effective radiated power from 4 to 280 watts and the effective height of antenna above average terrain from 17.5 to 37 metres. As a result of the increase in power, the transmitter's status will change from that of a low-power, unprotected service to that of a protected Class A1 service.

On November 10, 2021, North Superior Broadcasting Ltd. received CRTC approval to change the authorized contours of CFNO-FM-5 Longlac, Ontario by changing the class from unprotected low-power (LP) to regular power A1, increasing the effective radiated power from 4 to 125 watts, decreasing the effective height of the antenna above average terrain from 30.0 to 2.1 meters. On the same day, North Superior Broadcasting received CRTC approval to change the authorized contours of CFNO-FM-7 Nakina, Ontario, from an unprotected LP to a regular power A1, by increasing the effective radiated power from 49 to 110 watts, and increasing the effective height of the antenna above average terrain from 4.0 to 13.8 meters.

On August 7, 2025, the CRTC approved the application by North Superior Broadcasting Ltd. to change the technical parameters of CFNO-FM-1 Nipigon/Red Rock by increasing the effective radiated power from 200 to 237 watts, increasing the effective height of the antenna above average terrain from 178.5 to 219.0 metres, amending the transmitter coordinates and relocating the transmitter antenna.

== CJWA-FM ==
CJWA-FM in Wawa was also formerly a rebroadcaster of CFNO. North Superior launched a separate station there in 1998, after the town's sole local radio station (also going by the CJWA callsign, but at 1240 AM) was closed in 1996. CFNO's former rebroadcaster in Chapleau also became a rebroadcaster of CJWA's signal instead.

North Superior sold CJWA at the same time as CFNO, although to a different new owner, Labbe Media.
