= CJRL-FM =

Radio station in Kenora, Ontario

Coordinates: 49°46′45″N 94°27′26″W

- Kenora, Ontario; Canada
- Broadcast area: Ontario and Manitoba
- Frequency: 89.5 MHz
- Branding: 89.5 The Lake

Programming
- Format: Adult contemporary

Ownership
- Owner: Acadia Broadcasting
- Sister stations: CKQV-FM

History
- First air date: 1938
- Former frequencies: 1420 kHz (1938–1941); 1450 kHz (1941–1943); 1220 kHz (1943–2004)

Technical information
- Class: B
- ERP: 31,200 watts
- HAAT: 105.2 metres

Links
- Webcast: Listen Live
- Website: yourkenora.ca

CJRL-FM is a Canadian radio station, broadcasting at 89.5 FM in Kenora, Ontario. The station broadcasts an adult contemporary format branded as 89.5 The Lake.

The station was originally launched in 1938 as CKCA 1420 kHz. In 1941, CKCA moved to 1450. In 1943, Kenora Broadcasting Co. Ltd. took ownership of CKCA and changed the frequency to 1220 with a new callsign CJRL.

CJRL went through different ownerships over the years.

In 2004, CJRL was given approval by the CRTC to convert to 89.5 FM and began broadcasting in November 2004 as 89.5 Mix FM. Following the flip to FM, the station shifted format to adult contemporary from hot adult contemporary.

Formerly owned and operated by Fawcett Broadcasting, the station was acquired in 2007 by Acadia Broadcasting Limited of Saint John, New Brunswick.

As of June 30, 2011, CJRL was rebranded 89.5 The Lake, continuing as an adult contemporary station, the station's playlist now primarily includes pop and rock hits from the 1970s to today. Following the unexpected passing of Charlie Tuna in early 2016, the 70's Show that aired on weekends was replaced with the Totally Awesome 80's show with Kent Jones.

The station airs a local morning show hosted by Talia Saley and an afternoon drive show hosted by Caleb McMillan. News and community content are also provided through the station's digital portal, Your Kenora.
