= Cabot Links =

Golf course in Nova Scotia, Canada

Coordinates: 46.236822°N 61.304781°W

Cabot Cape Breton
- Interactive map of Cabot Cape Breton

Club information
- Location: Inverness, Nova Scotia, Canada
- Established: July 2011
- Owner: Ben Cowan-Dewar
- Total holes: 46; 36 regular holes 10 par-3 holes

Cabot Links
- Designed by: Rod Whitman
- Par: 70
- Length: 6,854 yards
- Course rating: 72.8
- Slope rating: 132

Cabot Cliffs
- Designed by: Bill Coore, Ben Crenshaw
- Par: 72
- Length: 6,764 yards
- Course rating: 74.3
- Slope rating: 144

Cabot Links is a golf course located in Inverness, Nova Scotia, Canada. It is a full 18-hole true links course, but a 10-hole version of the course was opened in 2011. It was designed by Alberta native, Rod Whitman and is located on a former coal mine along the coast of the Gulf of Saint Lawrence.

Construction and development began in the late 2000s (although the town had been trying to get a golf course well before then). The golf course was the creation of Ben Cowan-Dewar, a Toronto-born 33-year-old, with the financial backing from Mike Keiser. Mike Keiser was the creator of Bandon Dunes.

The golf course has moderately assisted with the rebirth of the Inverness economy, which went into decline after its coal mines closed. Its success led to the opening of a second golf course in July 2015, called Cabot Cliffs. Designed by world-renowned architect Bill Coore and two-time Masters Winner Ben Crenshaw, Cabot Cliffs quickly captured the media's attention and is considered by many to be in the running as one of the top courses in the world. The grand opening of the course was in June 2016. Adam Calver was the grow in superintendent of Cabot Cliffs. Mr. Calver moved to Vietnam and works for Faldo Design in 2023.

The Cabot golf resort hosts three onsite restaurants, a 60-room hotel, a pro shop, and a gift shop. Cabot's real-estate program was launched in July 2015, consisting of nineteen Golf Villas and a discovery center. Villas are available for purchase and rent.

Links Golf: While golf in the twenty-first century is played on more than 40,000 courses worldwide, only 246 of them may be classified as links. What differentiates this less-than 1% from the rest is their location and the type of terrain on which they are built. In Scotland, where golf is believed to have originated in the 15th century, the first courses were developed on stretches of land known as links. Farmers deemed these coastal lands useless because of the sandy soil, so golf course designers began to make use of them. Located between the land and the sea and with little to no trees, Links golf is subject to strong coastal wind which is why it is best played closer to the ground. The firm soil and short grass make bump-and-run shots and putting from close off the green popular choices. Both Cabot Links and Cabot Cliffs are True Links courses as they are located on the rugged coastline of Cape Breton Nova Scotia, where sandy soil, firm fairways, and coastal views embrace golf's early Scottish roots.

== Quick facts ==
Cabot Links Golf	
Founded	July, 2011
Location	15933 Central Avenue, Inverness, NS
Holes	18
Par	70
Yards	6854
Course Designers	Rod Whitman
Owners	Ben Cowan Dewar
Ranked	Number 42 in the world by Golf Digest 2014/2015; Number 82 in the world by Golf Magazine 2013; Second Best Public course in Canada by Links Magazine 2015 .

Cabot Cliffs Golf	
Founded	July 1, 2015
Locations	39 Whitman Way, Inverness, Cape Breton, NS
Holes	18
Par	72
Yards	6765
Course Designers	Bill Coore and Ben Crenshaw
Owners	Ben Cowan-Dewar
Ranked	Number 1 public course in by Links Magazine 2015 .

Cabot Links Golf Resort	
Hotel Rooms	60
Villa Rooms	16
Onsite Restaurants	Cabot Bar; Panorama; Public House
Shopping	Cabot Links Pro Shop; Cabot Cliffs Pro Shop; Cabot Trading Company
Designer	Suzan Fitzgerald
Awards	Best Overall Architecture by; 2013 Air Canada En Route Hotel Design Awards: Trip Advisor Certificate of Excellence 2015; Great Golf Resorts of the World; 2014 VISA Canada Traveller Experience of the Year Award

== Scorecards ==
Cabot Links
Tee	Rating/Slope	1	2	3	4	5	6	7	8	9	Out	10	11	12	13	14	15	16	17	18	In	Total
Black	72.8 / 132	540	247	330	450	178	465	192	580	360	3342	385	620	450	440	102	413	457	170	475	3512	6854
Green	70.9 / 125	530	230	313	410	172	440	186	550	340	3171	355	580	425	420	95	385	430	142	452	3284	6455
Silver	68.4 / 123	515	222	290	405	168	434	140	515	320	3009	325	490	410	405	92	381	388	128	392	3011	6020
Hybrid	65.5 / 115	515	160	290	405	168	273	140	425	320	2696	325	425	365	357	92	381	334	128	325	2732	5428
Orange	63.3 / 106	444	160	256	270	165	273	122	425	265	2380	306	425	365	357	85	280	334	85	325	2562	4942
SI		7	9	15	3	12	4	16	8	17		13	1	5	11	18	10	6	14	2
Par		5	3	4	4	3	4	3	5	4	35	4	5	4	4	3	4	4	3	4	35	70

Cabot Cliffs
Tee	Rating/Slope	1	2	3	4	5	6	7	8	9	Out	10	11	12	13	14	15	16	17	18	In	Total
Black	74.3 / 144	581	402	389	221	330	186	589	549	126	3373	557	404	245	398	188	560	176	331	532	3391	6764
Green	72.5 / 142	573	379	374	212	321	171	572	515	116	3233	544	377	223	362	172	538	150	277	509	3152	6385
Silver	71.5 / 136	556	364	355	202	316	158	564	498	114	3127	516	365	200	342	156	524	129	239	492	2963	6090
Hybrid	68.6 / 129	461	283	355	131	304	158	413	498	114	2717	460	365	162	314	156	524	129	215	492	2756	5473
Orange	66.5 / 118	461	283	247	131	304	114	413	437	94	2484	460	330	162	314	131	443	89	215	431	2575	5059
SI		5	3	11	13	7	15	1	9	18		2	16	6	8	17	4	14	12	10
Par		5	4	4	3	4	3	5	5	3	36	5	4	3	4	3	5	3	4	5	36	72

== See also ==
- List of golf courses in Nova Scotia
