= CKPR-DT =

Television station in Thunder Bay

- Thunder Bay, Ontario; Canada
- Channels: Digital: 2 (VHF); Virtual: 2
- Branding: CKPR Thunder Bay

Programming
- Affiliations: 2.2: CTV

Ownership
- Owner: Dougall Media; (Thunder Bay Electronics Ltd.)
- Sister stations: CHFD-DT, CKPR-FM, CFNO-FM, CJSD-FM

History
- First air date: October 4, 1954
- Former call signs: CFPA-TV (1954–1957); CFCJ-TV (1957–1962); CKPR-TV (1962–2011)
- Former channel numbers: Analog: 2 (VHF, 1954–2011)
- Former affiliations: CBC Television (1954–2014)
- Call sign meaning: Port Arthur

Technical information
- Licensing authority: CRTC
- ERP: 1.2 kW
- HAAT: 366.2 m (1,201 ft)
- Transmitter coordinates: 48°31′25″N 89°6′55″W

Links
- Website: ckprthunderbay.com

CKPR-DT (channel 2) is a television station in Thunder Bay, Ontario, Canada, affiliated with CTV. It is owned by locally based Dougall Media alongside Global affiliate CHFD-DT (channel 4). The two stations share studios on Hill and Van Norman Streets in central Thunder Bay; CKPR-DT's transmitter is located in Shuniah, Ontario.

In June 2014, Dougall Media announced that the station would disaffiliate from CBC Television (with which it was affiliated since its 1954 sign-on) in September to become a CTV affiliate, bringing CTV back to the Thunder Bay market for the first time since sister station CHFD switched its affiliation from CTV to Global in 2010.

== History ==
CKPR-DT began broadcasting on October 4, 1954, as CFPA-TV. The "PA" stood for Port Arthur, where the station was licensed until it merged with Fort William to form Thunder Bay in 1970. The station was then owned by Ralph H. Parker Ltd. along with CFPA radio (AM 1230, now CKTG-FM). Three years later on July 20, 1957, Thunder Bay Electronics, owned by the Dougall family, bought CFPA-TV and changed its callsign letters to CFCJ-TV. They changed again ten years later in 1967, to CKPR-TV.

In 1972, Thunder Bay Electronics launched the CTV affiliate CHFD-TV (which switched to Global in 2010) and thus CKPR-TV and CHFD-TV became one of the first private twinstick stations in Canada.

Logo used until May 2012, when the station rebranded to CKPR Thunder Bay. This logo was also used at sister station CHFD until it became a Global affiliate in 2010.

In March 2010, CKPR announced it was unable to come to an agreement with CBC to continue to operate as an affiliate. CKPR filed an application with the Canadian Radio-television and Telecommunications Commission (CRTC) seeking to remove its condition of licence which mandates affiliation with CBC Television. The affiliation agreement would expire on August 31, 2011, and, according to the station would not be renewed by the CBC after that date. CKPR said that it was tentatively planning to disaffiliate as of September 1, 2010, but that it had yet to find a new programming source, and that it would be reserving the right to remain a CBC affiliate through the end of the 2010–2011 season, even if the relevant condition of licence was removed.

CKPR did not disaffiliate and continued negotiations with CBC. In March 2011, CKPR announced they had come to a programming agreement, under which the station would continue to provide CBC programming in Thunder Bay, which at the time was described as having a five-year term.

In early 2014, the station filed a new application to disaffiliate, indicating that it had the ability under its current agreement to opt out in September 2014. In June 2014, the CRTC approved CKPR's request to disaffiliate from CBC while suggesting to both CKPR and CBC to "consider alternate solutions" in order to "ensure the availability of the CBC's service over-the-air" in the Thunder Bay area.

On September 1, 2014, CKPR-DT disaffiliated from the CBC to become an affiliate of the CTV Television Network, which returned to local terrestrial television after sister station CHFD-TV disaffiliated from that network in 2010.

Despite the affiliation change, all TV service providers serving Thunder Bay, like all service providers across Canada, will continue to be required to include a CBC Television signal as part of their basic services. Shortly before the affiliation change, CBC confirmed that CBLT Toronto would be added to the basic packages of Shaw Communications cable systems in the area (channel 2 in Thunder Bay), and Tbaytel TV (channels 210 [SD] and 802 [HD]).

On January 27, 2016, Dougall Media officials revealed that CKPR and CHFD are both being sustained by the payouts from life insurance policies on former owner Fraser Dougall and a former general manager who both died in 2015, and said that the stations were likely to sign off for good by September 1, barring a favourable change in CRTC policies. Both stations, however, are still in operation.

== Distribution ==
As part of the CBC's budget cuts, the operation of CBLK-TV and the other CBC-owned analog rebroadcasters of private affiliates was discontinued on July 31, 2012.

== Programming ==
CKPR carries the majority of its programming in pattern with CTV's Eastern Time schedule. The station broadcasts local newscasts at 6 and 11 p.m. under the TBT News branding; in lieu of local newscasts in these timeslots, CKPR simulcasts CTV News Ottawa from CJOH-DT at noon and 5 p.m. In the past, the station sometimes opted out of selected daytime and overnight programming for locally sold paid programming.

Since March 2020, the station has broadcast HAGI TV Bingo—a weekly charity bingo event in support of Handicapped Action Group Incorporated (HAGI)—on Saturday nights throughout much of the year. The transition to televised games was originally prompted by the COVID-19 pandemic (with Gary Cooper, who had hosted the in-person event, hosting the televised games until his death in 2024), but has remained on the station since.

In many cases during its CBC affiliation (as of fall 2008, up to five times per day) CBC network shows broadcast during daytime or late-night on CKPR were preempted by paid programming. For example, with the Kids' CBC block having expanded to five hours on August 31, 2009, CKPR did not air the final hour of the expanded block, just like Corus-owned CBC affiliates (at the time) in Peterborough (CHEX-DT), Oshawa (CHEX-TV-2) and Kingston (CKWS-DT), opting for an hour of paid programming instead. Also, as of February 2010, CKPR also preempted a half-hour of Kids' CBC at 7 a.m. for a local morning newscast (which has since been cancelled with the affiliation switch in favor of Canada AM). Furthermore, in September 2011, as more programming toward adults, CKPR began preempting the 9-11 a.m. and the Saturday 11:30 a.m. block of Kids' CBC and a few months later in 2012, CKPR also began to preempt the 7:30 a.m. portion of Kids' CBC for more local and paid programming. The 9–11 a.m. block of Kids' CBC eventually returned in February 2012 but CKPR continued to decline the 7:30–8 a.m., 11 a.m.–noon and the Saturday 11:30 a.m.–noon blocks of Kids' CBC. CKPR also signs off most nights after the late-night talk show Conan on Monday to Thursday and the late network movie on weekends.

When CHFD was primarily a CTV affiliate, Global programs that could not be cleared by CHFD-DT, such as Survivor, would occasionally air on CKPR-DT instead. In the past, some CTV programming not cleared by CHFD may have also aired on CKPR.

== Technical information ==
=== Subchannels ===
Subchannel of CKPR-DT
| Subchannel | Res. | Short name | Programming |
|---|---|---|---|
| 2.2 | 1080i | CKPR-DT | CTV |

=== Analog-to-digital conversion ===
CKPR-DT flash cut to digital in early August 2011 alongside sister station CHFD.

Through the use of PSIP, digital television receivers display CKPR-DT's virtual channel as 2.1.

In January 2011, Dougall Media applied with the CRTC to broadcast its digital signal instead on channel 2, following the digital conversion date.

== See also ==
- CKPR-FM
- CHFD-DT
