= CHWV-FM =

Radio station in Saint John, New Brunswick

Coordinates: 45°16′23.1″N 66°3′35.6″W

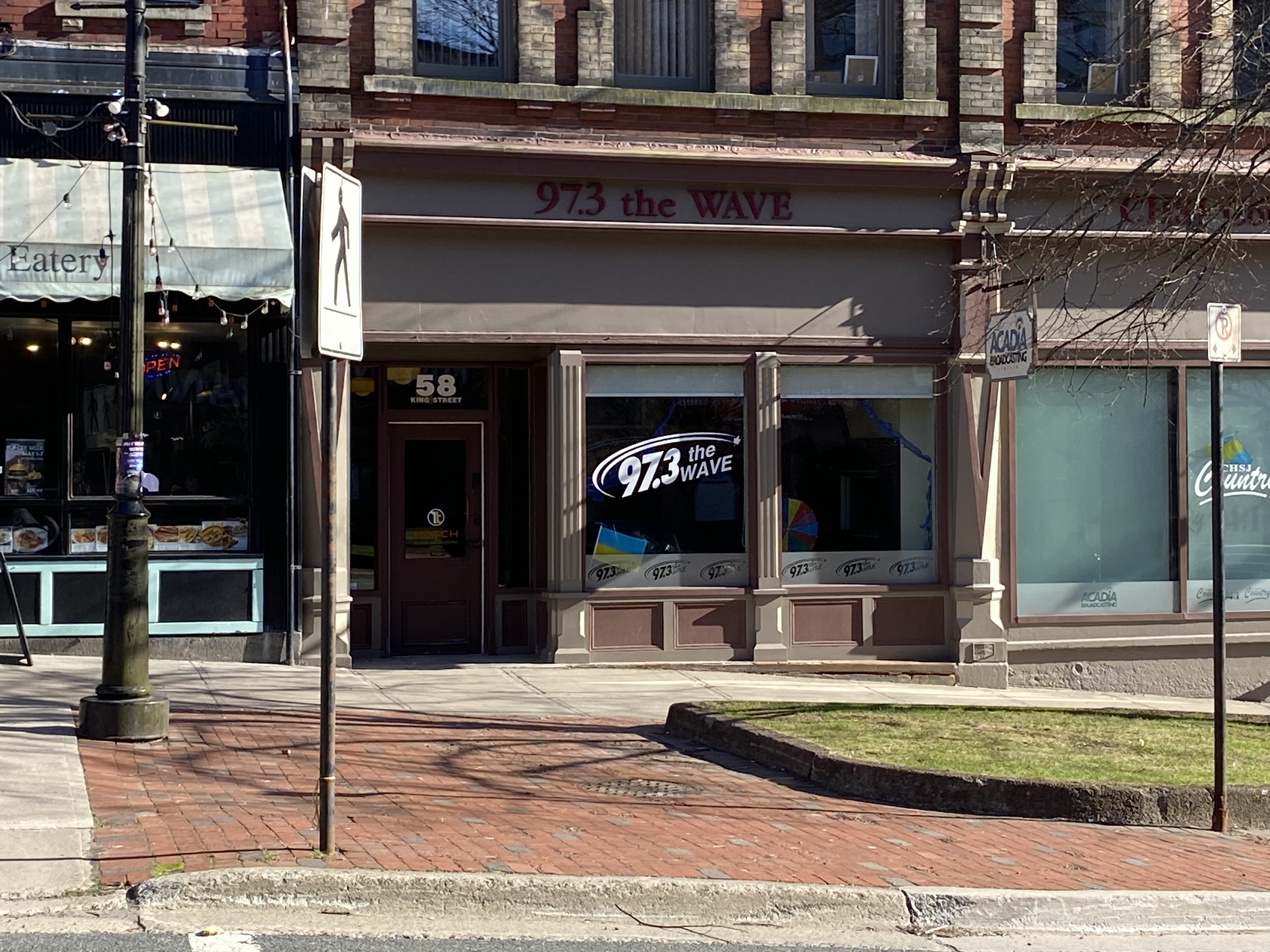
- 97.3 The Wave station building on King Street in Saint John, New Brunswick
- Saint John, New Brunswick; Canada
- Frequency: 97.3 MHz
- Branding: 97.3 The Wave

Programming
- Format: Hot adult contemporary

Ownership
- Owner: Acadia Broadcasting
- Sister stations: CHSJ-FM

History
- First air date: February 19, 2001
- Call sign meaning: "The Wave" (branding)

Technical information
- Class: C
- ERP: 55,000 watts average 100,000 watts peak horizontal polarization only
- HAAT: 382 metres (1,253 ft)

Links
- Website: thewave.ca

CHWV-FM is a Canadian radio station in Saint John, New Brunswick broadcasting at 97.3 FM. The station broadcasts a hot adult contemporary format branded as 97.3 The Wave.

The station is owned by Acadia Broadcasting which also owns sister station CHSJ-FM.

== History ==
On August 24, 2000, New Brunswick Broadcasting Co., Limited received approval by the CRTC to operate a new adult contemporary music format at Saint John.

Their first broadcast was on February 19, 2001, as an Adult Contemporary station. In January 2003, the station changed formats to adult top 40, morphing to more of a modern adult contemporary direction (or an adult top 40/alternative rock mix).

The station's new main competitor is CIOK-FM, which changed to hot AC in 2009.

The station's other competitors are CIBX-FM, broadcasting an Adult contemporary format, and CIHI-FM, broadcasting a Contemporary hit radio format in Fredericton.

Since 2011, the station began phasing in more rhythmic contemporary content; however it is still a Canadian hot adult contemporary reporter per Mediabase and Nielsen BDS. Even though non-pop rock music still gets a few adds, they remain a modern adult contemporary.
