= CILU-FM =

Radio station at Lakehead University in Thunder Bay, Ontario

Coordinates: 48°25′14″N 89°15′37″W

- Thunder Bay, Ontario; Canada
- Frequency: 102.7 MHz
- Branding: LU Radio

Programming
- Format: campus radio

Ownership
- Owner: Lakehead University

History
- First air date: 2005
- Call sign meaning: Lakehead University

Technical information
- Class: A1
- ERP: 134 watts
- HAAT: −20.7 metres (−68 ft)

Links
- Website: www.luradio.ca

CILU-FM is a Canadian radio station, which broadcasts at 102.7 FM in Thunder Bay, Ontario. It is the campus radio station of the city's Lakehead University.

The station was licensed by the Canadian Radio-television and Telecommunications Commission in 2004 and officially launched in early 2005. The station has a mandate to produce programming that is not otherwise available by radio in Thunder Bay: this includes classical, world music, hip-hop, electronica, and French-language and Indigenous programming. All station programming is produced by volunteers.
