= CFQK-FM =

Radio station in Ontario, Canada

Coordinates: 48°30′27″N 89°27′28″W

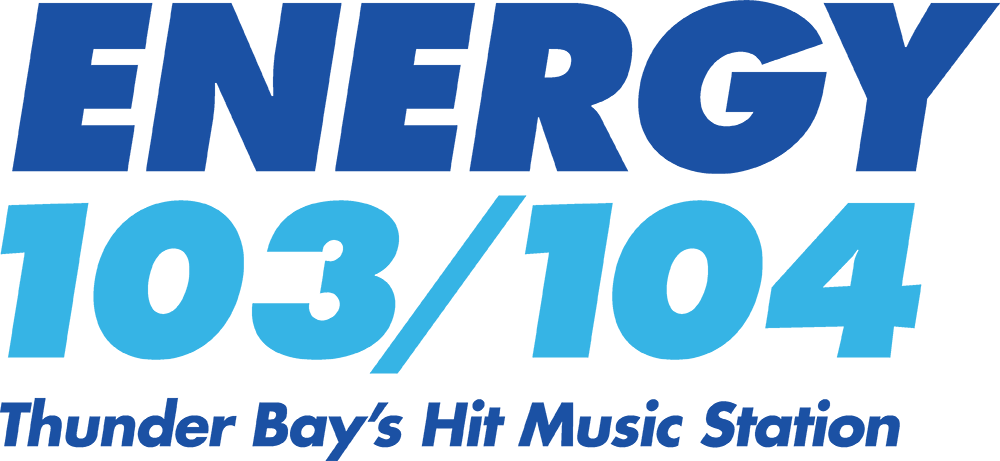
- Kaministiquia, Ontario; Canada
- Broadcast area: Thunder Bay; Shuniah
- Frequency: 104.5 MHz
- Branding: Energy 103/104

Programming
- Format: Contemporary hit radio

Ownership
- Owner: Northwest Broadcasting (Dougall Media)

History
- First air date: 2002

Technical information
- Class: LP
- ERP: 50 watts
- HAAT: 55 metres (180 ft)
- Repeater: CKED-FM 103.5 Shuniah

Links
- Website: energy103104.com

CFQK-FM is a Canadian radio station, which broadcasts at 104.5 FM in Kaministiquia, Ontario, and targets the nearby city of Thunder Bay. The station airs a contemporary hit radio music format as Energy 103/104.

The station also broadcasts on 103.5 FM in Shuniah, with the callsign CKED-FM.

== History ==
On September 15, 2000, Joel Virtanen, on behalf of Northwest Broadcasting, received approval by the CRTC to operate a new FM radio station to broadcast at 104.5 MHz in Kaministiquia.

CFQK-FM began broadcasting at 104.5 FM Kaministiquia in 2001 or 2002.

On November 21, 2002, the CRTC approved Northwest Broadcasting Inc.'s application to operate a new FM transmitter at Mount Baldy to serve Shuniah on the frequency of 103.5 MHz and would rebroadcast the programming of CFQK-FM Kaministiquia. The CKED-FM transmitter signed on at 103.5 MHz Shuniah in 2003. Both frequencies are low-power transmitters with partial audience reach into the nearby city of Thunder Bay.

On June 10, 2005, the CRTC denied an application by Dougall Media to transfer control of Northwest Broadcasting and its associated company 1333598 Ontario Limited, citing non-compliance and management concerns.

Since CFQK-FM signed on in 2002, the station has gone through a number of short-lived formats such as hot ac/oldies Max 104.5, country music "Cottage Country 104", and adult hits Larry FM. In mid-2005, the station dropped the adult hits "Larry FM" format and switched to a hot adult contemporary format known as 103.5, 104.5 HOT-FM. Earlier that same year, an unrelated radio station CKTG-FM in Thunder Bay dropped its Hot 105.3 Hot AC/CHR format to classic rock.

In May 2008, CFQK-FM and its repeater CKED-FM once again changed formats this time to a country music format, known as 103.5 The Thunder.

In April 2010, the station applied to increase the effective radiated power for CFQK-FM from 50 watts to 250 watts and its repeater CKED-FM from 10 watts to 250 watts. This application was denied by the CRTC on October 15, 2010.

On June 13, 2014, CFQK-FM and CKED-FM dropped the Thunder Country format and switched to a contemporary hit radio format as Energy FM.

On January 3, 2022, the station made a slight rebrand as Energy 103/104, Thunder Bay's Hit Music Station. The rebrand was accompanied by a new logo.

== Transmitters ==
Rebroadcasters of CFQK-FM
City of licence	Identifier	Frequency	Power	Class	RECNet	CRTC Decision
Shuniah	CKED-FM	103.5 FM	10 watts	LP	Query	2002-380
