= CBQ-FM =

CBC Music station in Thunder Bay, Ontario, Canada

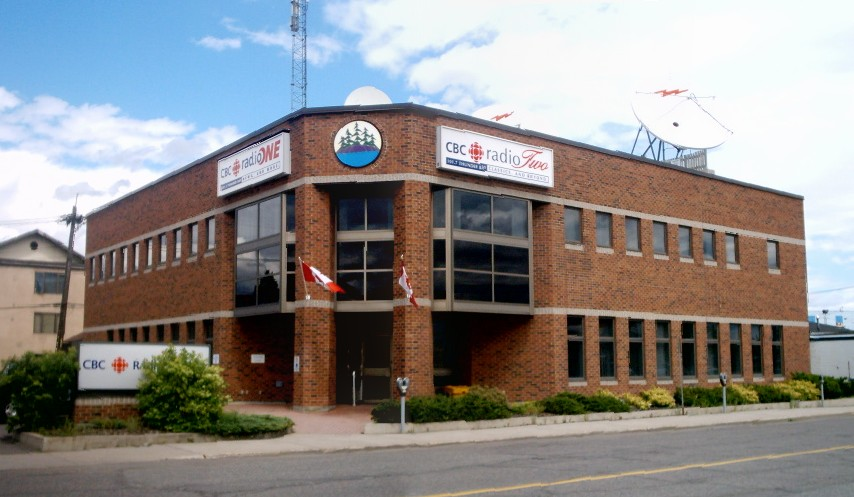
- CBC Radio's Thunder Bay studio
- Thunder Bay, Ontario; Canada
- Broadcast area: Thunder Bay
- Frequency: 101.7 MHz

Programming
- Format: Public broadcasting
- Network: CBC Music

Ownership
- Owner: Canadian Broadcasting Corporation
- Sister stations: CBQT-FM

History
- First air date: August 13, 1984
- Call sign meaning: Canadian Broadcasting Corporation Quetico

Technical information
- Licensing authority: CRTC
- Class: B
- ERP: 23,500 watts
- HAAT: 205 metres (673 ft)
- Transmitter coordinates: 48°33′3.6″N 89°13′26.4″W

Links
- Website: cbc.ca/thunderbay

CBQ-FM is a Canadian radio station, airing the Canadian Broadcasting Corporation's CBC Music network at 101.7 FM in Thunder Bay, Ontario.

The station was launched on August 13, 1984.
