= CHSJ-FM =

Radio station in Saint John, New Brunswick

Coordinates: 45°16′23.1″N 66°3′35.6″W

- Saint John, New Brunswick; Canada
- Frequency: 94.1 MHz
- Branding: Country 94

Programming
- Format: Country

Ownership
- Owner: Acadia Broadcasting
- Sister stations: CHWV-FM

History
- First air date: March 1928
- Former call signs: CFBO (1928–1934)
- Former frequencies: 890 kHz (1928–1933); 1210 kHz (1933–1934); 1120 kHz (1934–1945); 1150 kHz (1945–1988); 700 kHz (1988–1998)
- Call sign meaning: Saint John (broadcast area)

Technical information
- Class: C
- ERP: 50.4 kW average 100 kW peak horizontal polarization only
- HAAT: 382 metres (1,253 ft)

Links
- Website: country94.ca

CHSJ-FM is a Canadian radio station broadcasting on 94.1 MHz in Saint John, New Brunswick. The station plays a country format under the Country 94 branding. CHSJ is owned by Acadia Broadcasting, which also owns sister station CHWV-FM.

== History ==
Originally known as CFBO, CHSJ's first broadcast was on 890 kilocycles in March 1928, under the ownership of C.A. Munro Limited. The current callsign was adopted in 1934 when four Saint John newspaper publishing shareholders — Howard P. Robinson, J.D. McKenna, T. F. Drummie and L. W. Bewick saw great potential for little CFBO and purchased it from Mr. C.A. Monro. After the sale CHSJ was owned by the Saint John Publishing Company.

Currently, the callsign CFBO-FM has been assigned to the frequency of 90.7 MHz, branded as BO-FM as an adult contemporary francophone format radio station, broadcasting in Moncton since 2004.

From 1934 to 1936, the station was an affiliate of the Canadian Radio Broadcasting Commission. In 1936, CHSJ affiliated with the Canadian Broadcasting Corporation and later with the CBC Trans-Canada Network. CBC station CBD went on the air in 1964 but CHSJ is listed as remaining a CBC Radio affiliate until at least 1980.

In 1944, Kenneth C. Irving purchased Saint John Publishing from its principal shareholder Howard P. Robinson. Along with the city's two newspapers he acquired the CHSJ station as part of the group. Later that year the company's name was changed to the New Brunswick Publishing Company. One of its operations was New Brunswick Broadcasting, responsible for radio station CHSJ. In 1947, CHSJ-FM signed on the air on 100.5 MHz, which became a co-owned station of the CHSJ that signed on in 1927 as CFBO. CHSJ-FM left the air in 1954.

CHSJ changed its AM frequency several times: to 1210 kHz in 1933, to 1120 in 1934, to 1150 in 1945, and to 700 in 1988. (The station was originally approved to move to 700 in 1985.) On December 3, 1986, the Canadian Radio-television and Telecommunications Commission (CRTC) denied an application by New Brunswick Broadcasting to convert CHSJ to 94.1 MHz with 100,000 watts. In 1998, however, CHSJ received approval by the CRTC to convert CHSJ to 94.1 MHz.
