= CKTG-FM =

Radio station in Thunder Bay, Ontario

Coordinates: 48.4335°N 89.21942°W

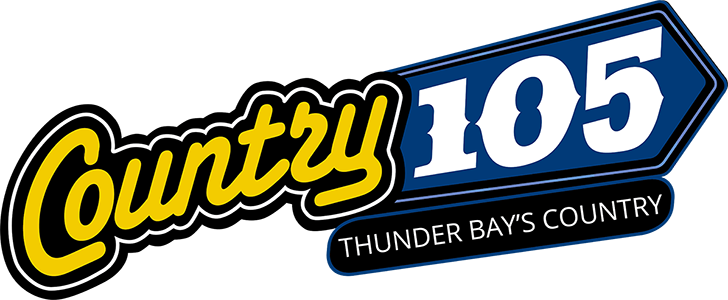
- Thunder Bay, Ontario; Canada
- Frequency: 105.3 MHz
- Branding: Country 105

Programming
- Format: Country

Ownership
- Owner: Acadia Broadcasting
- Sister stations: CJUK-FM

History
- First air date: September 3, 1944
- Former call signs: CFPA (1944–1980); CJLB (1980–2005)
- Former frequencies: 1230 kHz (1944–1996)

Technical information
- ERP: 100,000 watts

Links
- Webcast: Listen Live
- Website: country1053.ca

CKTG-FM is a Canadian radio station, broadcasting at 105.3 FM in Thunder Bay, Ontario, owned by Acadia Broadcasting. The station broadcasts a country format using the on-air brand name as Country 105.

== History ==
The station was launched in 1944 as CFPA at 1230 kHz, an AM Canadian Broadcasting Corporation's Dominion Network station owned by local businessman Ralph Parker. When the Dominion Network dissolved in 1962, CFPA transferred its affiliation to the main CBC Radio network. It ceased airing CBC programming in 1972, adopting a country music format.

In 1980, the station was purchased by Leader Broadcasting and adopted the call sign CJLB. In 1988, the station was acquired by Newcap Broadcasting. On July 27, 1984, CJLB became an affiliate of American Top 40 with Casey Kasem.

On December 13, 1984, the CRTC approved a number of applications for a number of AM radio stations across Ontario including CJLB Thunder Bay to increase their nighttime power from 250 watts to 1,000 watts.

In 1986, CJLB received CRTC approval to add a low-power FM transmitter in Nipigon/Red Rock on 96.3 MHz to rebroadcast the programs of CJLB Thunder Bay. CJLB applied to move Nipigon's frequency to 96.1 MHz, and it is uncertain if this was ever implemented.

In 1995, Newcap entered a local marketing agreement with Dougall Media, giving Dougall the right to manage the station. On November 2, 1994, CJLB was given approval by the Canadian Radio-television and Telecommunications Commission (CRTC) to convert to FM. In 1996, the station moved to 105.3 MHz.

In 2002, CJLB adopted a hot adult contemporary/CHR format as Hot 105. In 2004, Dougall terminated the LMA when Newcap applied to purchase CJUK. Newcap changed CJLB's callsign to its current CKTG calls and adopted its current classic rock format as 105.3 The Giant in early 2005. In mid-2005, CFQK-FM in Kaministiquia, Ontario, located near Thunder Bay which had no affiliation with CKTG dropped their "Larry FM" variety hits format for Hot AC/Top 40 as HOT FM.

On March 16, 2009, CKTG became the first radio station in Canada to carry The Bob & Tom Show, a syndicated radio show from the United States.

On July 14, 2009, Newcap announced it would be selling CKTG and sister station CJUK-FM to Acadia Broadcasting for $4.5 million CAD plus working capital. The sale received CRTC approval on December 2, 2009.

In early October 2010, CKTG-FM changed its format again, to adult hits, playing a variety of music "From the '60s, 70's, 80's and beyond", and re-branded as The New Giant FM.

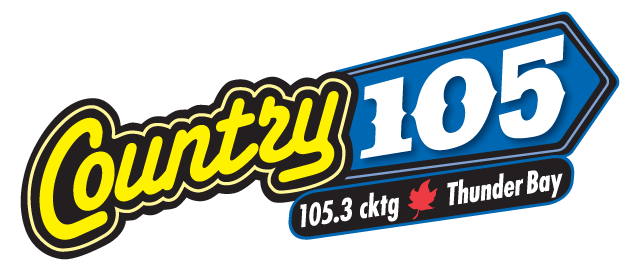
Logo of Country 105 from 2014 to 2018

In March 2014, CKTG made the change to its format, switching to country re-branded as Country 105.

When atmospheric conditions are right, CKTG can be heard across Lake Superior in Munising and Marquette, Michigan.
