= CKBW-FM =

Radio station in Bridgewater, Nova Scotia

Coordinates: 44°23′17″N 64°40′44″W

- Bridgewater, Nova Scotia; Canada
- Broadcast area: Lunenburg County
- Frequency: 98.1 MHz
- Branding: CKBW

Programming
- Format: Classic hits

Ownership
- Owner: Acadia Broadcasting
- Sister stations: CJHK-FM

History
- First air date: December 27, 1947
- Former frequencies: 1000 kHz (1947–2001)
- Call sign meaning: Canada Knows Bridgewater

Technical information
- Class: B
- ERP: 32,000 watts
- HAAT: 149.7 metres (491 ft)

Links
- Webcast: Listen Live
- Website: yoursouthshore.ca

CKBW-FM is a Canadian radio station broadcasting at 98.1 FM in Bridgewater, Nova Scotia. The station also operates in Liverpool at 94.5 and in Shelburne at 93.1. The station plays a classic hits format branded as CKBW. CKBW is owned & operated by Acadia Broadcasting which also owns sister station CJHK-FM.

== History ==
CKBW's first broadcast was at AM 1000 on December 24, 1947, under local ownership. In July 1947, it was announced that CKBW would sign on the air. In 1949, Acadia Broadcasting hired Jamie MacLeod an announcer from CHNS, who had returned to announcing duties after serving in the RCAF as a Spitfire pilot. His assignment was Program Director and Operations Manager. In 1950, while still in high school in Bridgewater, the actor Donald Sutherland was hired by Jamie MacLeod as a part-time announcer at CKBW for 60 cents an hour. In the summer of 1953 Sutherland left CKBW and headed for the University of Toronto to study engineering. In 1967, the station moved from King Street to new studios and offices specially constructed on the second floor of the Bridgewater Shopping Plaza. In 1996, Bob MacLaren, former station general manager was inducted in the Canadian Association of Broadcasters Hall Of Fame. In 1999, Jamie MacLeod was inducted in the Canadian Association of Broadcasters Hall of Fame.

In 2001, CKBW flipped to the FM band at 98.1 MHz. The station changed formats numerous times. For much of the 1990s, CKBW played primarily country music until an official format change in 2001 to adopt an adult contemporary format.

On June 5, 2020 CKBW flipped to classic hits branded using its call letters.

== Transmitters ==
Rebroadcasters of CKBW-FM
City of licence	Identifier	Frequency	Power	Class	RECNet
Liverpool	CKBW-1-FM	94.5 FM	8,700 watts	B	Query
Shelburne	CKBW-2-FM	93.1 FM	8,600 watts	B	Query
