= Dougall Media =

Canadian media company

- Company type: Private company
- Industry: Media
- Headquarters: Thunder Bay, Ontario, Canada
- Key people: Hector Dougall, Owner
- Products: Broadcasting, television production
- Website: www.dougallmedia.com

Dougall Media is a Canadian media company which has several television, radio and publishing holdings in Northwestern Ontario.

== Television ==
Dougall Media owns CKPR-DT, a CTV affiliate (formerly a CBC affiliate until August 31, 2014), and CHFD-DT, a Global affiliate, both in Thunder Bay, Ontario. The two stations are what is known as a twinstick operation, and are in fact the sole remaining twinstick anywhere in English Canada. The two stations air programs from their respective networks, as well as local news and current affairs programs and specials.

Prior to February 2010, CHFD was a CTV affiliate which also carried some Global programming. The station was unable to come to agreement with CTV to continue operating as an affiliate and filed an application to the Canadian Radio-television and Telecommunications Commission (CRTC) to remove the CTV affiliation requirement from their license and to operate as a Global affiliate.

In March 2010, CKPR announced it was unable to come to an agreement with CBC to continue to operate as an affiliate, and filed an application with the CRTC to remove the CBC affiliation requirement from their license. CKPR stated in their application that it "would operate as an independent local station and intends to source its non-local programming". However, after continued negotiations, the station announced in March 2011 that they had come to an agreement that would see them air CBC programming for another five years; in June 2014, Dougall Media announced that CKPR's affiliation would switch from CBC to CTV in September.

The stations' status as a locally owned twinstick accounts for some of the unique circumstances of the Thunder Bay television market. For example, Thunder Bay was the only major market in the province in which CIII-DT and CHCH-DT did not add rebroadcasters during those stations' provincewide expansions in the 1990s; although both stations did apply for transmitters in Thunder Bay, both were declined by the CRTC due to the potential impact of out-of-market competition on Dougall's advertising revenue. It is also, for the same reason, the only major market in the province where CITY-DT is still unavailable either terrestrially or on basic cable.

Dougall has also previously cited CTV's cost-cutting measures of the early 2000s, such as the merger of all local news on the four CTV Northern Ontario stations in Northeastern Ontario into a single newscast produced in Sudbury, as a key factor in its refusal to consider selling the stations, lest such a sale result in the loss of local programming in Thunder Bay.

On January 27, 2016, Dougall Media officials revealed that CKPR and CHFD are both being sustained by the payouts from life insurance policies on former owner Fraser Dougall and a former general manager who both died in 2015, and at the time said the stations could sign off for good by September 1, 2016, barring a favourable change in CRTC policies. As of November 2025 the stations remained in operation.

=== Branding ===
The two stations were formerly united under the brand Thunder Bay Television. However, upon becoming a Global affiliate in February 2010, CHFD rebranded as Global Thunder Bay, following a branding scheme used at Global owned and operated stations. CKPR continued to use the Thunder Bay Television brand until May 2012, when it rebranded as CKPR Thunder Bay. Prior to this, the stations usually used the on-air branding scheme of Thunder Bay Television and then the name of the network to which the channel was affiliated, except in cases when the channel was airing programming that wasn't from the network to which it was affiliated. For example, CKPR-TV was normally branded as Thunder Bay Television - CBC, however, while airing non-CBC programming, such as TB News, it was branded as Thunder Bay Television - CKPR. Both stations still, however, air local newscasts under the single brand TBT News.

== Radio ==
Dougall Media owns CKPR-FM, CFQK-FM and CJSD-FM in Thunder Bay, as well as CFNO-FM in Marathon.

== Print ==
Dougall Media publishes a free weekly community newspaper, Thunder Bay Source, which is delivered to 35,000 households in Thunder Bay each Friday. The paper covers local news, including city council, education, health care, Indigenous issues and the local federal and provincial political scene, as well as weekly entertainment and sports features. It also hosts a selection of local columnists, including J.R. Shermack and former CBC Radio personality Fred Jones, a weekly movie column by North of Superior Film Association president Marty Mascarin, a food-related column by Derek Lankinen and an outdoor column by Keith Ailey.

It was formerly known as Thunder Bay Post, a name that was discontinued in October 2003. Prior to that it was known as Lakehead Living.

The paper's editorial staff also contributes to the news websites TbNewsWatch.com, NWONewswatch.com and SNNewswatch.com, which also have material contributed from the company's radio and television newsrooms.
