= CKPR-FM =

Radio station in Thunder Bay, Ontario

Coordinates: 48°31′27″N 89°06′53″W

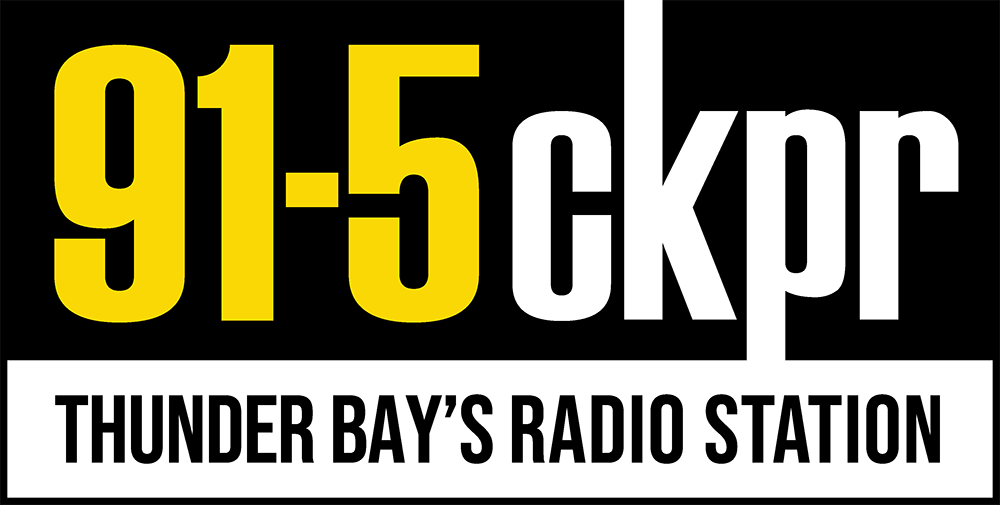
- Thunder Bay, Ontario; Canada
- Frequency: 91.5 MHz
- Branding: 91-5 CKPR

Programming
- Format: Hot adult contemporary
- Affiliations: Premiere Networks

Ownership
- Owner: Dougall Media
- Sister stations: CJSD-FM, CFNO-FM, CKPR-DT, CHFD-DT

History
- First air date: 1927
- Former frequencies: 890 kHz (1927–1933); 780 kHz (1933–1935); 930 kHz (1935–1938); 730 kHz (1938–1941); 580 kHz (1941–2007)
- Call sign meaning: Pioneer Radio or Port Arthur, former name of Thunder Bay

Technical information
- Class: C
- ERP: 100,000 watts horizontal polarization only
- HAAT: 308.7 metres (1,013 ft)
- Repeater: 93.5 CKPR-FM-2 Atikokan

Links
- Website: ckpr.com

CKPR-FM is a radio station in Thunder Bay, Ontario, Canada. Owned by Dougall Media, the station broadcasts a hot adult contemporary format at 91.5 FM, and 93.5 FM in Atikokan.

== History ==
The station was originally launched in Midland in 1927. It was purchased by the Dougall Motor Car Company in 1931, and moved to Fort William. The station originally aired at 890 AM, moving to 780 in 1933, 930 in 1935, 730 in 1938 and finally 580 in 1941. The station became an affiliate of the CBC's Trans-Canada Network in 1947, then became independent in 1962 after the Trans-Canada and Dominion networks merged to become CBC Radio, whose affiliation in the Lakehead region went to CFPA (now CKTG-FM).

In 1948, the station's owners launched an FM simulcast on CKPR-FM. In 1962, the owners also acquired CFPA-TV, the city's CBC Television affiliate, which then adopted the CKPR callsign as well.

In 2006, Dougall applied to change the station's frequency to 91.5 FM. This application was approved by the CRTC on February 2, 2007. The transition occurred on June 4, 2007 at 12:00 PM ET and was simulcast on Thunder Bay Television. The AM 580 signal then went to a repeating message advising listeners to tune to 91.5 FM. It's believed that CKPR 580 AM had left the air for good on August 3, 2007, however, the 580 AM signal was to leave the air by early September of that year.

After the station's FM conversion, the station adopted an adult contemporary format, dropping its former news/talk programming. The station eventually evolved to its current hot adult contemporary format.

On March 2, 2011, the station applied to the CRTC to add an FM transmitter at Atikokan to rebroadcast the programming of CKPR-FM Thunder Bay. The CRTC approved C.J.S.D. Inc.'s application on September 30, 2011 and the new CKPR-FM transmitter in Atikokan operates on the frequency of 93.5 MHz with the callsign CKPR-FM-2. The Atikokan transmitter officially signed on December 5, 2011 at Noon.

On February 3, 2022, the station underwent a slight rebrand as 91-5 CKPR, Thunder Bay's Radio Station. A new logo accompanied the rebrand.
