= Port Hawkesbury =

Port Hawkesbury Gaelic: Baile a' Chlamhain / An Gut
- Town
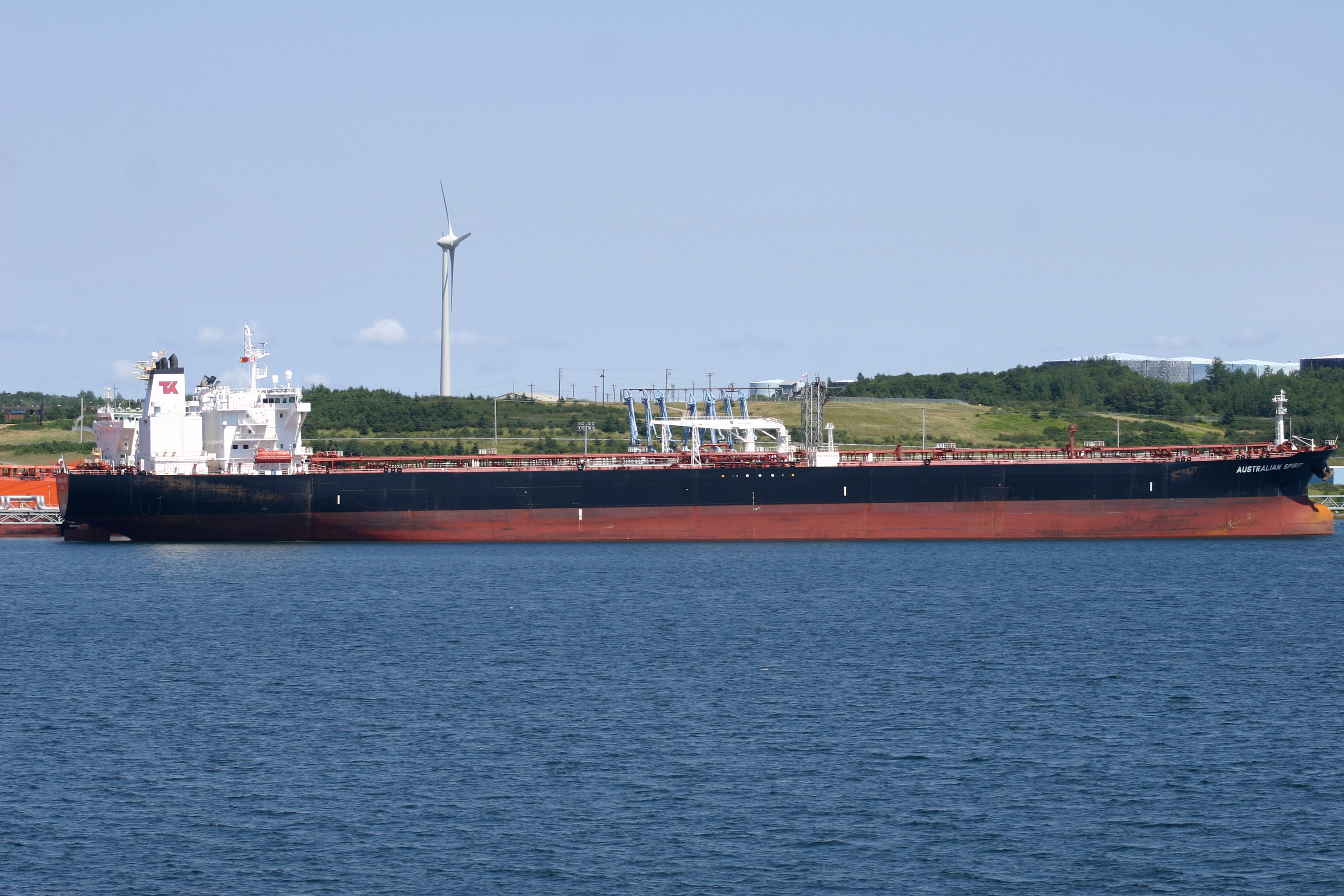

- Seal
- Nickname: Cape Breton's Front Porch
- Location of Port Hawkesbury, Nova Scotia Port Hawkesbury (Canada)
- Coordinates: 45°36′55″N 61°21′51″W
- Country: Canada
- Province: Nova Scotia
- Municipality: Inverness County
- Founded: 1789
- Incorporated: January 22, 1889

Government
  - Mayor: Brenda Chisholm-Beaton
  - Governing Body: Port Hawkesbury Town Council

Area (2021)
  - Total: 8.10 km^{2} (3.13 sq mi)
- Highest elevation: 54 m (177 ft)
- Lowest elevation: 0 m (0 ft)

Population (2021)
  - Total: 3,210
  - Density: 396.3/km^{2} (1,026/sq mi)
- Time zone: UTC-4 (AST)
  - Summer (DST): UTC-3 (ADT)
- Postal code: B9A
- Area code: 902
- Telephone Exchange: 625
- Median Earnings*: $65,500
- NTS Map: 11F11 Port Hawkesbury
- GNBC Code: CBELL
- Website: townofporthawkesbury.ca
- Median household income, 2020 ($) (all households)

Port Hawkesbury (Scottish Gaelic: Baile a' Chlamhain) is a municipality in southern Cape Breton Island, Nova Scotia, Canada. While within the historical county of Inverness, it is not part of the Municipality of Inverness County.

== History ==
The end of glaciation began 13,500 years ago^{[5]} and ended with the region becoming largely ice free 11,000 years ago. The earliest evidence of Palaeo-Indian settlement in the region follows rapidly after deglaciation.^{[6]}

Several thousand years ago, the territory of the province became known as a part of the territory of the Mi'kmaq nation of Mi'kma'ki. Mi'kma'ki included what are now the Maritimes, parts of Maine, Newfoundland and the Gaspé Peninsula. The town of Port Hawkesbury is in the traditional Mi'kmaq district of Unama'ki.

In 1605, French colonists established the first permanent European settlement in the future Canada (and the first north of Florida) at Port Royal, founding what would become known as Acadia.^{[7][8]} While the French established the first European settlements on Île Royale at present day Englishtown in 1629 and the following year at St. Peter's, just 40 kilometres away from present-day Port Hawkesbury, neither settlement lasted past 1659. European settlers did not return to the island until Louisbourg were re-established by the French in 1713. By 1763 most of Acadia, including what had now become Cape Breton Island had come under British control.

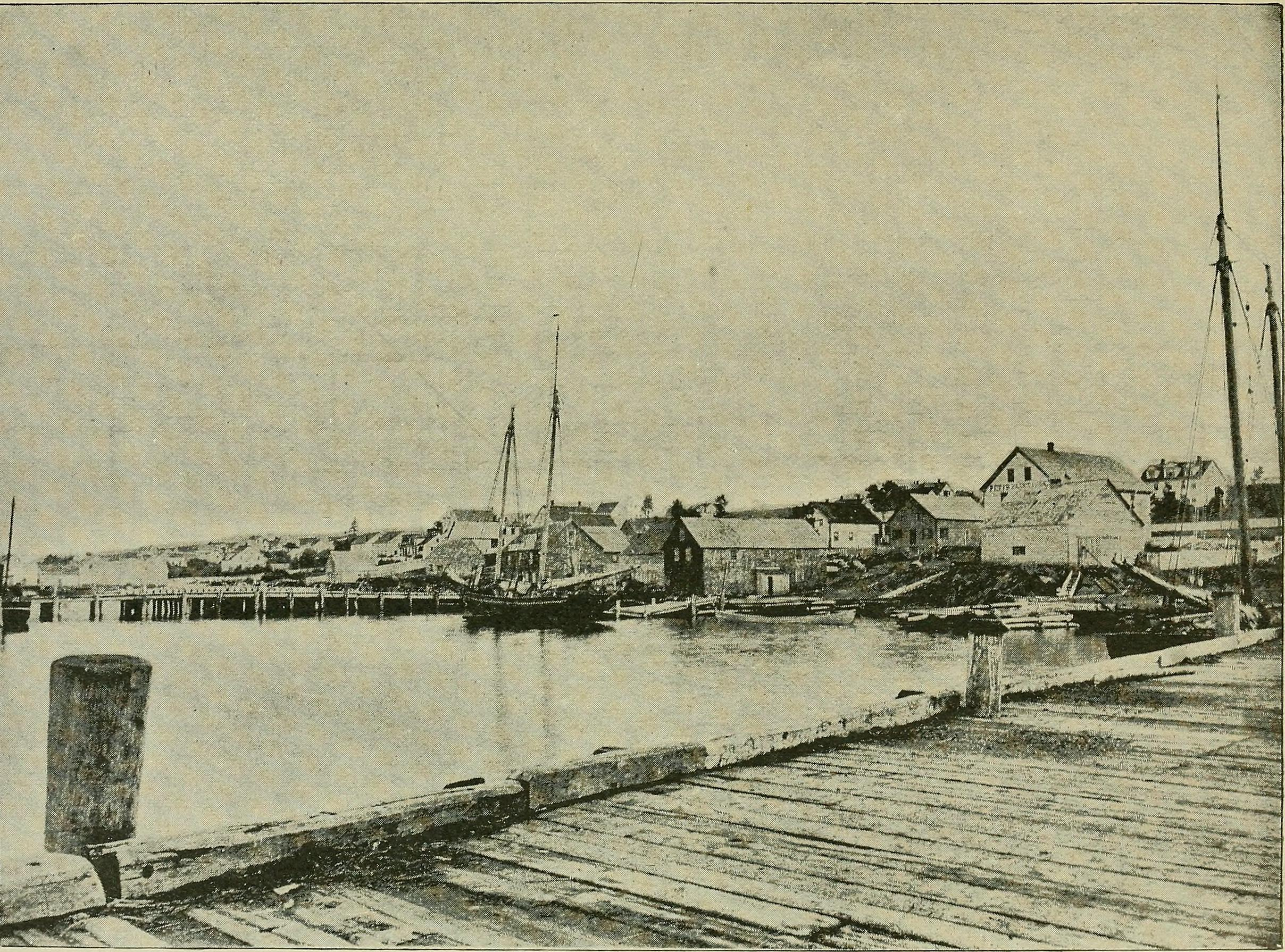
Port Hawkesbury waterfront, 1890

Founded in 1789 as Ship Harbour, Port Hawkesbury was renamed in honour of Admiral Sir Edward Hawke, who commanded the ship that brought Governor Edward Cornwallis to Halifax. Incorporated in 1889, the community built ships for the timber export trade in the early and mid 19th century, such as the brig James, the subject of one of the earliest ship portraits in Canada.^{[4]} Schooners and fishing boats were also built for the inshore and banks fishery by firms such as the noted boat builder H.W. Embree and Sons.

Today the town is largely a service centre for western Cape Breton Island, with many of its residents working in large industries, particularly the pulp and paper plant in the industrial park located in the adjacent community of Point Tupper, Richmond County.

== Government ==
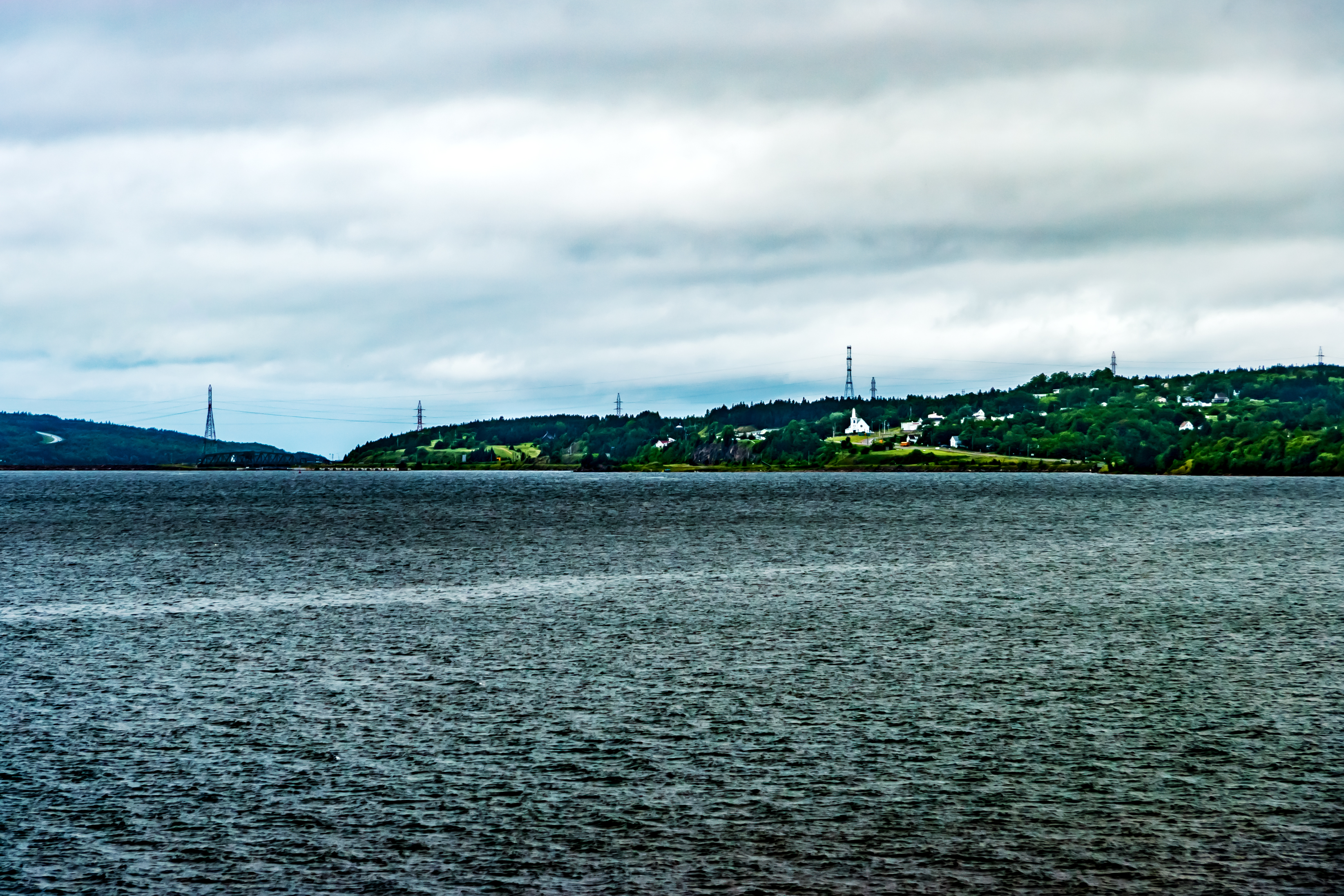
Canso Causeway at Port Hawkesbury

The Town of Port Hawkesbury is governed by a council composed of a mayor and four councillors elected at-large. ^{[23]} The mayor is Brenda Chisholm-Beaton. Day to day activities are managed by a chief administrative officer (CAO) who is accountable to Council.^{[25]}Municipal governments in Nova Scotia are elected every four years and the most recent round of elections took place on October 15, 2016.^{[26]} The provincial legislation that creates and empowers the municipality is the Nova Scotia Municipal Government Act.^{[27]}

Municipal Council is responsible for all facets of the municipal government, including directly delivered and shared or regional services. Directly delivered services include services such fire, public works, roads, as well as the municipally owned and operated electrical and water utilities. The municipality participates in shared services, such as library services and policing. The town's municipal operating budget was $7.8 million in the 2018/19 fiscal year.^{[28]}

Port Hawkesbury is represented in the Nova Scotia House of Assembly by Allan MacMaster, elected to the riding of Inverness, and in Canada's House of Commons by Mike Kelloway, elected to represent the riding of Cape Breton—Canso.

== Economy ==
In 2006, the Port of Port Hawkesbury was the second largest by annual tonnage in Canada, second only to Vancouver, British Columbia, due to large volumes of crushed rock and gravel shipments and oil trans-shipments. It handled 31.6 million metric tonnes in 2006, of which 21.6 million tonnes was crude petroleum. By 2011, the volume of annual tonnage had dropped to 23.7 million tonnes, making it the 7th largest port in Canada.

The port is served by tugs of Svitzer Towing such as the tug Point Chebucto. Historically, it was a stop for American coastal steam ships.

Located in neighbouring Point Tupper, the Port Hawkesbury Mill began operation in 1962. The overwhelming majority of the paper produced is exported to the United States. The mill has the capability to produce nearly 400,000 tons of supercalendered paper, or 25–20% of the market for that type of paper. The mill was closed for a year 2011-12, following the 2008 financial crisis. However, by 2018, the company reported its annual order book was once again full.

== Geography ==
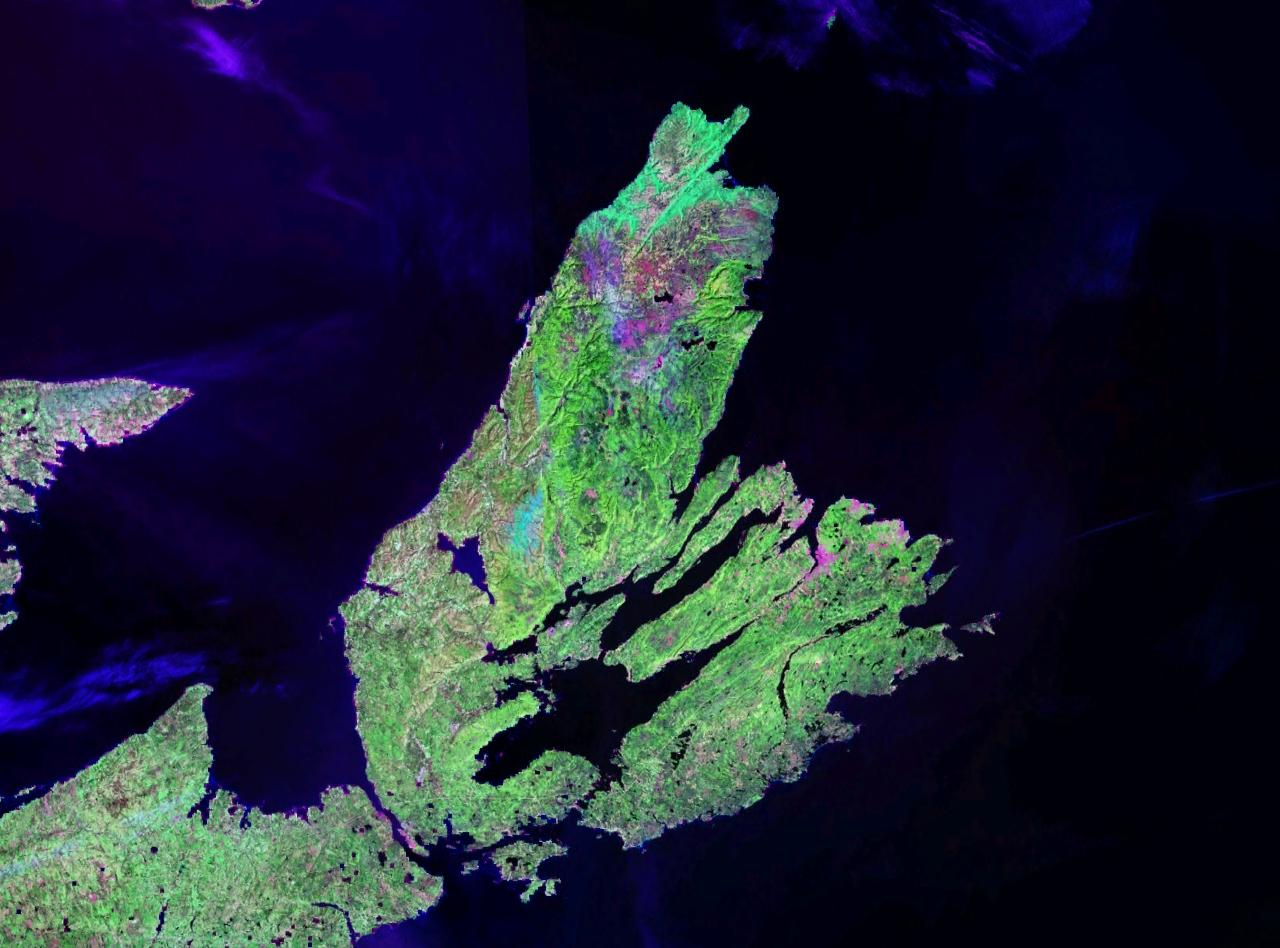
NASA landsat photo of Cape Breton Island

The land area of the municipality is 8.1 square kilometres with a population density (2016) of 396.6 persons per square kilometre. This compares to the provincial land area of 52,940 square kilometres and population density of 17.4 persons per square kilometre.

=== Climate ===
Port Hawkesbury experiences a Humid continental climate (Dfb). Due to the proximity to surrounding bodies of water, seasons tend to be delayed when compared to areas further inland. Precipitation is high, with the fall and winter being the wettest time of year and summer being the driest. Winters are cold, snowy and stormy with frequent snowstorms. Summer is the most pleasant time of year, with significantly less precipitation and warm temperatures.

The highest (reliable) temperature ever recorded in the strait area was 35.0 °C (95 °F) on 7 July 1912 and 19 July 1975. The coldest temperature ever recorded was −28.5 °C (−19 °F) on 7 February 1993.

Climate data for Port Hawkesbury Airport, 1991–2020 normals, extremes 1885–present (Note: Climate data was recorded at Port Hastings from October 1885 to June 1913 and again from June 1959 to September 1989, at Port Hawkesbury Airport from December 1985 to August 2004, at Port Hawkesbury from January 2006 to May 2009 and at Port Hawkesbury Airport from June 2010 to present.)
Month	Jan	Feb	Mar	Apr	May	Jun	Jul	Aug	Sep	Oct	Nov	Dec	Year
Record high °C (°F)	17.0 (62.6)	13.6 (56.5)	23.7 (74.7)	27.1 (80.8)	31.7 (89.1)	34.0 (93.2)	35.0 (95.0)	34.0 (93.2)	33.0 (91.4)	26.5 (79.7)	25.6 (78.1)	16.0 (60.8)	35.0 (95.0)
Mean daily maximum °C (°F)	−1.8 (28.8)	−2.1 (28.2)	1.5 (34.7)	6.8 (44.2)	13.4 (56.1)	18.9 (66.0)	23.2 (73.8)	23.5 (74.3)	19.6 (67.3)	13.2 (55.8)	7.5 (45.5)	2.2 (36.0)	10.5 (50.9)
Daily mean °C (°F)	−5.8 (21.6)	−6.5 (20.3)	−2.5 (27.5)	2.7 (36.9)	8.2 (46.8)	13.6 (56.5)	18.1 (64.6)	18.6 (65.5)	14.7 (58.5)	9.1 (48.4)	4.0 (39.2)	−1.1 (30.0)	6.1 (43.0)
Mean daily minimum °C (°F)	−9.9 (14.2)	−10.7 (12.7)	−6.9 (19.6)	−1.5 (29.3)	3.0 (37.4)	8.2 (46.8)	13.0 (55.4)	13.5 (56.3)	9.8 (49.6)	5.0 (41.0)	0.4 (32.7)	−4.4 (24.1)	1.6 (34.9)
Record low °C (°F)	−27.0 (−16.6)	−28.5 (−19.3)	−26.7 (−16.1)	−13.5 (7.7)	−7.0 (19.4)	−3.0 (26.6)	−0.6 (30.9)	1.1 (34.0)	−5.6 (21.9)	−7.2 (19.0)	−13.1 (8.4)	−24.0 (−11.2)	−28.5 (−19.3)
Average precipitation mm (inches)	121.2 (4.77)	115.7 (4.56)	113.4 (4.46)	106.4 (4.19)	98.1 (3.86)	97.3 (3.83)	96.2 (3.79)	81.8 (3.22)	116.6 (4.59)	156.5 (6.16)	146.9 (5.78)	133.6 (5.26)	1,383.6 (54.47)
Average rainfall mm (inches)	55.6 (2.19)	48.6 (1.91)	74.2 (2.92)	91.9 (3.62)	97.5 (3.84)	97.3 (3.83)	96.2 (3.79)	81.8 (3.22)	116.6 (4.59)	156.4 (6.16)	133.1 (5.24)	81.0 (3.19)	1,130.1 (44.49)
Average snowfall cm (inches)	65.6 (25.8)	67.1 (26.4)	39.3 (15.5)	14.5 (5.7)	0.6 (0.2)	0.0 (0.0)	0.0 (0.0)	0.0 (0.0)	0.0 (0.0)	0.1 (0.0)	13.8 (5.4)	52.6 (20.7)	253.5 (99.8)
Mean monthly sunshine hours	101.4	120.7	139.3	156.1	191.2	221.4	227.3	224.0	172.7	137.0	98.8	78.8	1,868.7
Source: Environment Canada (Precipitation, rain snow 1981–2010. Sunshine data recorded at Eddy Point)

== Demographics ==
Historical population
Year	Pop.	±%
1901	633	—
1911	684	+8.1%
1921	869	+27.0%
1931	1,011	+16.3%
1941	1,031	+2.0%
1951	1,034	+0.3%
1956	1,078	+4.3%
1961	1,346	+24.9%
1981	3,850	+186.0%
1986	3,869	+0.5%
1991	3,991	+3.2%
1996	3,809	−4.6%
2001	3,701	−2.8%
2006	3,517	−5.0%
2011	3,366	−4.3%
2016	3,214	−4.5%
2021	3,210	−0.1%

In the 2021 Census of Population conducted by Statistics Canada, Port Hawkesbury had a population of 3,210 living in 1,415 of its 1,523 total private dwellings, a change of −0.1% from its 2016 population of 3,214. With a land area of 8.1 km^{2} (3.1 sq mi), it had a population density of 396.3/km^{2} (1,026.4/sq mi) in 2021.

== Media ==
- 101.5 (FM) - The Hawk
- SAERC FM - 93.9
- SAERC TV
- The Reporter, community newspaper

== Notable people ==
- Lynn Coady, author.
- Mark Day, actor.
- Aaron Johnson, professional hockey player.
- Billy Joe MacLean, politician.

== See also ==
- List of municipalities in Nova Scotia
