= CJSD-FM =

Radio station in Thunder Bay, Ontario

Coordinates: 48°31′27″N 89°06′53″W

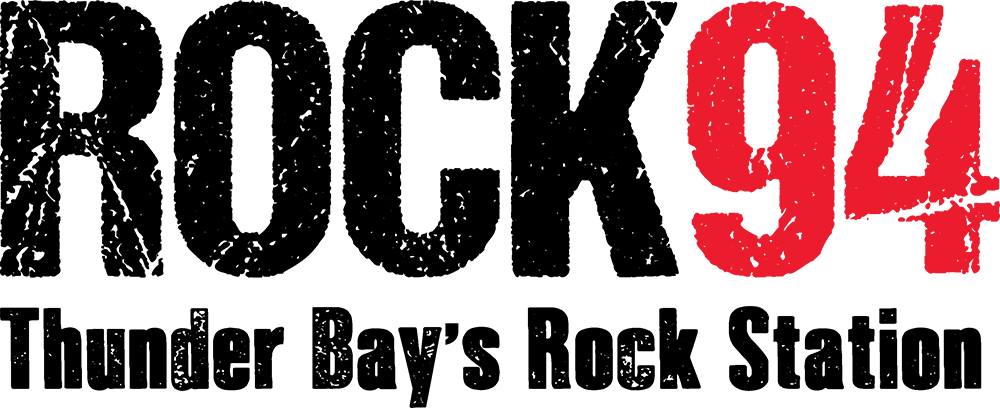
- Thunder Bay, Ontario; Canada
- Frequency: 94.3 MHz
- Branding: Rock 94

Programming
- Format: Active rock

Ownership
- Owner: Dougall Media
- Sister stations: CKPR-FM, CFNO-FM, CHFD-DT, CKPR-DT

History
- First air date: October 1948
- Former call signs: CKPR-FM (1948–1975)

Technical information
- Class: C
- ERP: 93,000 watts
- HAAT: 308.5 metres (1,012 ft)

Links
- Webcast: Listen Live
- Website: www.rock94.com

CJSD-FM is a Canadian radio station, broadcasting at 94.3 FM in Thunder Bay, Ontario. The station, owned by Dougall Media, broadcasts an active rock format branded as "Rock 94".

== History ==
The station was launched in October 1948 as CKPR-FM, an FM simulcast of CKPR. The station appears to have launched distinct programming in the fall of 1975, the same year the callsign was changed to CJSD-FM.

Throughout the 1980s, the station repeatedly received only short-term license renewals due to regulatory violations, including its musical selections, its failure to comply with CRTC rules around spoken word programming, and its failure to submit logger tapes of its programming to the commission.
