= Shuniah =

- Municipality (single-tier)
- Municipality of Shuniah
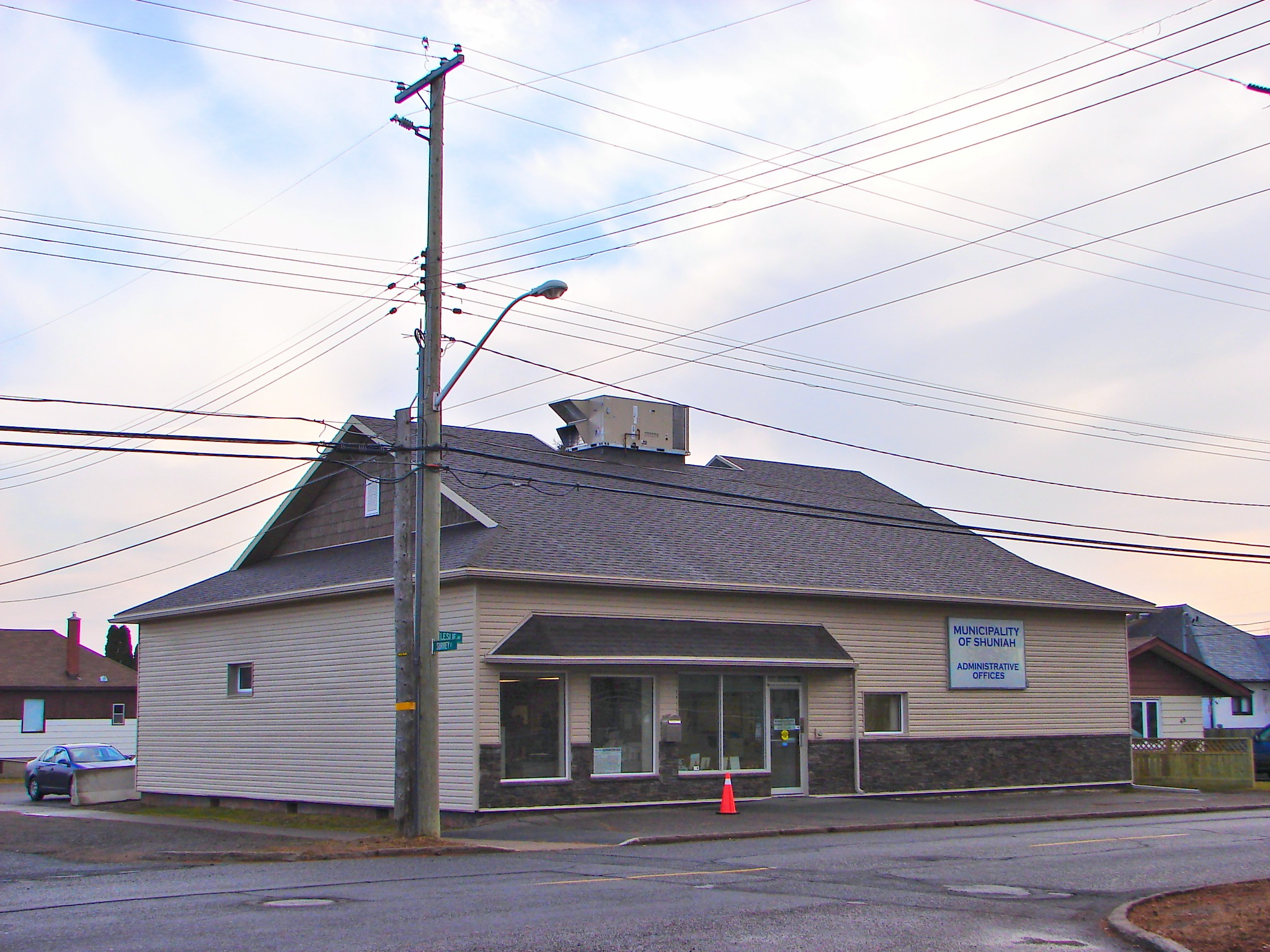
- Township hall

- Location within Ontario
- Coordinates: 48°35′N 88°50′W
- Country: Canada
- Province: Ontario
- District: Thunder Bay
- Settled: 1860s
- Incorporated: 1873

Government
  - Mayor: Wendy Landry
  - Fed. riding: Thunder Bay—Superior North
  - Prov. riding: Thunder Bay—Superior North

Area
  - Land: 571.34 km^{2} (220.60 sq mi)

Population (2021)
  - Total: 3,247
  - Density: 5.7/km^{2} (15/sq mi)
- Time zone: UTC-5 (EST)
  - Summer (DST): UTC-4 (EDT)
- Postal Code FSA: P0T & P7A
- Area code: 807
- Website: www.shuniah.org

Shuniah (/ˈʃuːniə/) is a municipal township in Thunder Bay District, Ontario, Canada, bordering the city of Thunder Bay to the southwest. Shuniah was incorporated by an act of the Ontario legislature in 1873, and at that time included much of present-day Thunder Bay and its predecessor and surrounding municipalities.

Shuniah, named after the Ojibwa word "zhooniyaa" for "money" or "silver" (see the French argent), was settled largely due to silver mining potential identified in the mid-19th century.

== History ==
The Municipality of Shuniah was incorporated on March 29, 1873, making it the oldest municipality in Thunder Bay District and one of the oldest in the province. Prince Arthur's Landing was its seat of local government, with John McKellar as the first reeve. At that time, its area included the geographic townships of Blake, Crooks, McIntyre, McGregor, McTavish, Neebing, Paipoonge, Pardee, and Sibley, as well as some islands southwest from Black Bay. Its territory was gradually reduced as follows:

- In 1874, the townships of Sibley and McTavish were removed.
- In 1881, the Township of Neebing was separately incorporated (then consisted of the geographic townships of Blake, Crooks, Neebing, Neebing Additional, Paipoonge, and Pardee).
- In 1884, the village of Prince Arthur's Landing was incorporated as the Town of Port Arthur (and was expanded in April 1892 and May 1906 with lands from MacGregor Township).
- In 1904, the Township of Paipoonge was separately incorporated.

By 1936, Shuniah included only three wards, the geographic townships of McIntyre, McGregor, and McTavish. That year, the Ontario Legislative Assembly removed a number of islands in Lake Superior that had formed the Island Ward since 1873. In 1970, McIntyre Township was amalgamated into the then new-created City of Thunder Bay.

In 1991, after serving as a councilor for several years, L. Dawn Eccles, BSN RN, was the first woman to become reeve of Shuniah, 118 years after its founding. During her tenure, the municipality completed extensive work to create environmental regulations which allowed some residents to live year-round on previously seasonal properties.

From 1994 to 2014, the township reeve was Maria Harding. On October 27, 2014, Wendy Landry was elected as Reeve and as of January 26, 2015 the title of the Head of Council was changed from Reeve to Mayor. Landry was re-elected in 2018.

== Geography ==
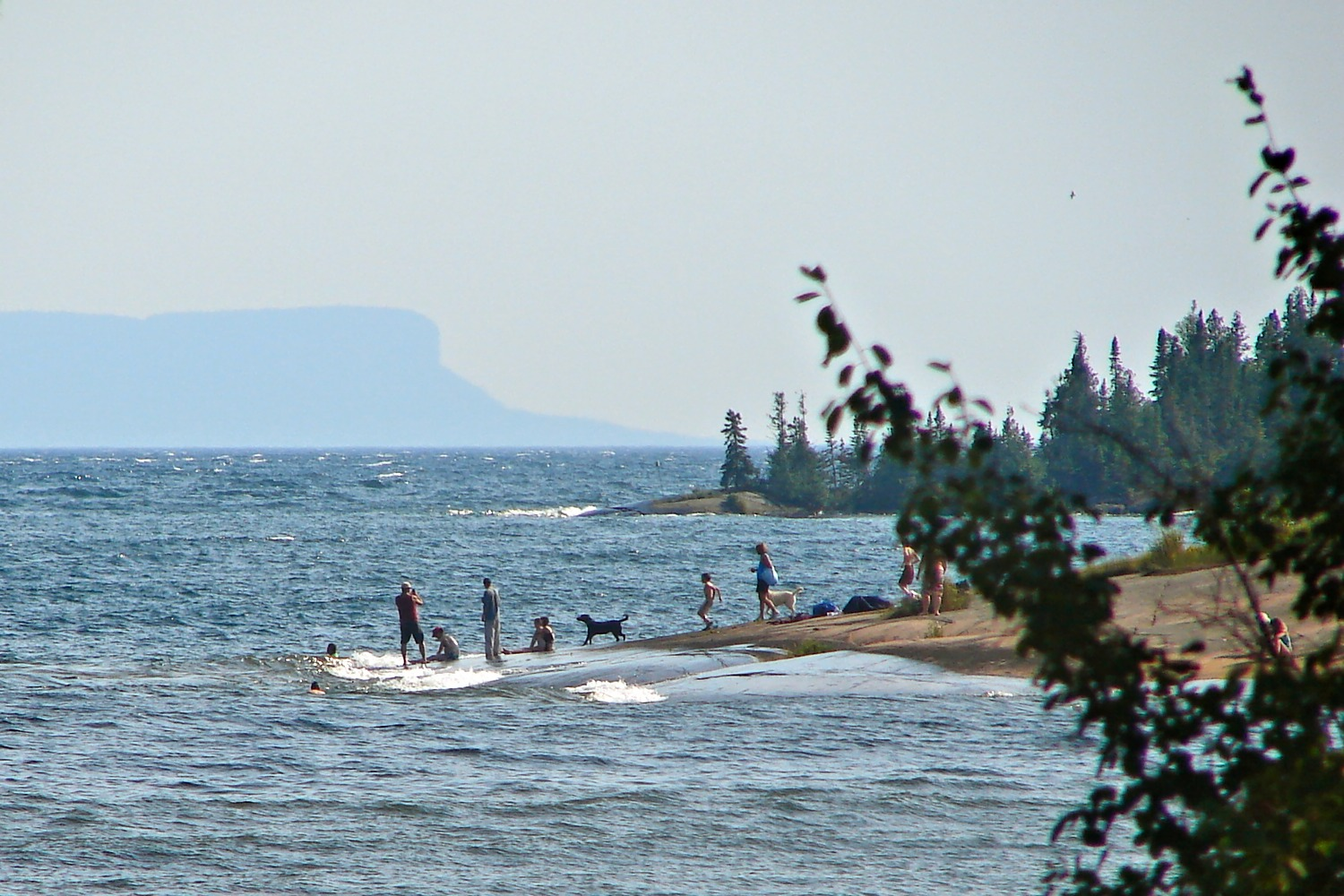
Thunder Bay of Lake Superior at Shuniah Township

The township is part of Thunder Bay's Census Metropolitan Area, and consists of the communities of:

- Amethyst Harbour
- Ancliff
- Bowker
- Ishkibibble
- Loon
- Mackenzie
- Navilus
- Pass Lake
- Pearl
- Silver Harbour
- Wild Goose

Serving today primarily as a rural bedroom community to Thunder Bay, Shuniah is also a popular cottaging locale, stretching about 40 kilometres (25 mi) along Thunder Bay and Black Bay of Lake Superior's northern shoreline.

== Demographics ==
In the 2021 Census of Population conducted by Statistics Canada, Shuniah had a population of 3,247 living in 1,425 of its 2,088 total private dwellings, a change of 16% from its 2016 population of 2,798. With a land area of 571.34 km^{2} (220.60 sq mi), it had a population density of 5.7/km^{2} (14.7/sq mi) in 2021.

Canada census – Shuniah community profile

	2021	2016	2011
Population	3,247 (+16.0% from 2016)	2,798 (+2.2% from 2011)	2,737 (-6.0% from 2006)
Land area	571.34 km^{2} (220.60 sq mi)	570.99 km^{2} (220.46 sq mi)	570.98 km^{2} (220.46 sq mi)
Population density	5.7/km^{2} (15/sq mi)	4.9/km^{2} (13/sq mi)	4.8/km^{2} (12/sq mi)
Median age	55.2 (M: 55.6, F: 54.8)	52.8 (M: 53.6, F: 51.9)	51.7 (M: 52.6, F: 50.7)
Private dwellings	2,088 (total) 1,425 (occupied)	2,130 (total)	2,156 (total)
Median household income	$109,000	$96,939

References: 2021 2016 2011

Historical census populations – Shuniah, Ontario

Year	Pop.	±%
1881	1,275	—
1901	71	−94.4%
1911	804	+1032.4%
1921	1,032	+28.4%
1931	1,692	+64.0%
1941	2,521	+49.0%
1951	3,044	+20.7%

Year	Pop.	±%
1956	4,355	+43.1%
1961	5,667	+30.1%
1966	5,600	−1.2%
1971	1,292	−76.9%
1976	1,715	+32.7%
1981	2,011	+17.3%
1986	2,077	+3.3%

Year	Pop.	±%
1991	2,182	+5.1%
1996	2,346	+7.5%
2001	2,466	+5.1%
2006	2,913	+18.1%
2011	2,737	−6.0%
2016	2,798	+2.2%
2021	3,247	+16.0%

Population counts are not adjusted for boundary changes.
Source: Statistics Canada

== See also ==
- List of townships in Ontario
