= List of community radio stations in Canada =

This is a list of community radio stations in Canada.

| Call sign | Frequency | City of licence | Owner |
|---|---|---|---|
== Alberta ==
| euroRADIO | euroradio.ca | Nanton | Nanton Community Broadcasting Association |
| CJWE-FM | 88.1 FM | Calgary | Aboriginal Multi-Media Society |
| CJSR-FM | 88.5 FM | Edmonton | First Alberta Campus Radio Association |
| CFED-FM | 97.9 FM | Edmonton | Société de la radio communautaire du Grand Edmonton Radio Cité |
| CKRP-FM | 95.7 FM | Falher | Société CKRP Nord-Ouest FM |
| CIYU-FM | 106.3 FM | Fort McKay | Fort McKay Radio Society |
| CHPL-FM | 92.1 FM | Lac La Biche | Le Club de la radio communautaire de Plamondon-Lac La Biche Boréal FM |
| CKXU-FM | 88.3 FM | Lethbridge | CKXU Radio Society |
| CFWE-FM Radio Network | varies | Edmonton | Aboriginal Multimedia Society |
== British Columbia ==
| CFMA-FM | 105.9 FM | Cache Creek | Ash-Creek Television Society |
| CHET-FM | 94.5 FM | Chetwynd | Chetwynd Communications Society |
| CKTZ-FM | 89.5 FM | Cortes Island | Cortes Community Radio Society |
| CIDO-FM | 97.7 FM | Creston | Creston Community Radio |
| CFNB-FM | 97.5 FM | D'Arcy | Anderson Lake Recreational and Cultural Society |
| CHLS-FM | 100.5 FM | Lillooet | Radio Lillooet Society |
| CJHQ-FM | 107.1 FM | Nakusp | Columbia Basin Alliance for Literacy |
| CHLY-FM | 101.7 FM | Nanaimo | Radio Malaspina Society |
| CJLY-FM | 93.5 FM | Nelson | Kootenay Co-op Radio |
| VE7NWR | 88.7 FM | New Westminster | City of New Westminster |
| CJMP-FM | 90.1 FM | Powell River | Powell River Community Radio Society |
| CHLI-FM | 101.1 FM | Rossland | Rossland Radio Cooperative |
| CFAD-FM | 92.1 FM | Salmo | Salmo FM Radio Society |
| CHIR-FM | 107.9 FM | Saltspring Island | Gulf Islands Community Radio Society |
| CFNR-FM | 92.1 FM | Terrace | Northern Native Broadcasting |
| CFRO-FM | 100.5 FM | Vancouver | Vancouver Cooperative Radio |
| CFUZ-FM | 92.9 FM | Penticton | Peach City Radio |
| CILS-FM | 107.9 FM | Victoria | Société radio communautaire Victoria |
| CFRD-FM | 92.5 FM | Wells | Wells Community Radio Association (OBCI) |
| CICK-FM | 93.9 FM | Smithers | Smithers Community Radio |
== Manitoba ==
| CKXL-FM | 91.1 FM | Winnipeg | La Radio communautaire du Manitoba |
| NCI Radio Network | varies | Winnipeg | Native Communications Inc. |
| CKUW-FM | 95.9 FM | Winnipeg | The Winnipeg Campus/Community Radio Society |
| CJUM-FM | 101.5 FM | Winnipeg | University of Manitoba Students' Union |
| CJJJ-FM | 106.5 FM | Brandon | Assiniboine Campus-Community Radio Society |
== New Brunswick ==
| CHSR-FM | 97.9 FM | Fredericton | St. Thomas University and University of New Brunswick Campus Radio |
| CHMA-FM | 106.9 FM | Tantramar | Mount Allison University Campus Radio |
| CIMS-FM | 103.9 FM | Balmoral | La Coopérative Radio Restigouche |
| CJUJ-FM | 103.3 FM | Bathurst | Phantom FM 103.3 |
| CFTI-FM | 101.1 FM | Big Cove | Native Broadcasting |
| CKRO-FM | 97.1 FM | Caraquet | Radio Péninsule |
| CKTP-FM | 95.7 FM | Fredericton | St. Mary's First Nation |
| CKUM-FM | 93.5 FM | Moncton | Les médias acadiens universitaires inc. - University of Moncton |
| CFJU-FM | 90.1 FM | Kedgwick | La Radio communautaire des Hauts-Plateaux |
| CKMA-FM | 93.7 FM | Miramichi | Radio Miracadie |
| CFBO-FM | 90.7 FM | Moncton | Radio Beauséjour |
| CHQC-FM | 105.7 FM | Saint John | Coopérative radiophonique – La Brise de la Baie |
| CJSE-FM | 89.5 FM | Shediac | Capacadie |
== Newfoundland and Labrador ==
| CHBI-FM | 95.7 FM | Burnt Islands | Burnt Islands Economic Development Board |
| CKOH-FM | 99.3 FM | Happy Valley-Goose Bay | Okalakatiget Society |
| CKVB-FM | 100.1 FM | Corner Brook | Bay of Islands Radio |
| CJRM-FM | 97.3 FM | Labrador City | Radio communautaire du Labrador |
| CIML-FM | 99.5 FM | Makkovik | Makkovik Radio Society |
| CJPL-FM | 89.9 FM | Postville | Postville Radio Society |
| CHLR-FM | 89.9 FM | Rigolet | Rigolet Radio Society |
| CJIK-FM | 94.1 FM | Sheshatshiu | Sheshatshiu Radio Society |
| CHEV-FM | 94.5 FM | Grand Falls-Windsor | Exploits Valley Community Radio |
== Northwest Territories ==
| CHFL-FM | 107.1 FM | Fort Liard | Fort Liard Communications Society |
| CKHR-FM | 107.3 FM | Hay River | Hay River Community Service Society |
| CKLB-FM | 101.9 FM | Yellowknife | Native Communications Society of the Northwest Territories |
| CIVR-FM | 103.5 FM | Yellowknife | L'Association Franco-Culturelle de Yellowknife |
== Nova Scotia ==
| CFTA-FM | 107.9 FM | Amherst | Tantramar Community Radio |
| CKJM-FM | 106.1 FM | Cheticamp | La Coopérative Radio-Cheticamp |
| CIFA-FM | 104.1 FM | Clare | Association Radio Clare |
| CHCN-FM | 106.9 FM | Cole Harbour | Cole Harbour Community Radio Society |
| CFEP-FM | 94.7 FM | Eastern Passage | Seaside Broadcasting |
| CICU-FM | 94.1 FM | Eskasoni First Nation | Greg Johnson |
| CKOA-FM | 89.7 FM | Glace Bay | Coastal Community Radio Cooperative |
| CIOE-FM | 97.5 FM | Lower Sackville | The Cobequid Cultural Society |
| CKRH-FM | 98.5 FM | Halifax | Radio Halifax Métro |
| CJQC-FM | 99.3 FM | Liverpool | Queens County Community Radio |
| CJIJ-FM | 99.9 FM | Membertou | Peter Christmas |
| CICR-FM | 99.1 FM | Parrsboro | Parrsboro Radio Society |
== Nunavut ==
| CFBI-FM | 97.7 FM | Cambridge Bay | Cambridge Bay Communications Society |
| CFRT-FM | 107.3 FM | Iqaluit | Association des francophones du Nunavut |
| CHAR-FM | 92.7 FM | Rankin Inlet | James Sandy |
== Ontario ==
| CKON-FM | 97.3 FM | Akwesasne | Akwesasne Communication Society |
| CHPD-FM | 105.9 FM | Aylmer | Aylmer and area Inter-Mennonite Community Council |
| CKOL-FM | 93.7 FM | Campbellford | Campbellford Area Radio Association |
| CJRO-FM | 107.7 FM | Carlsbad Springs | Carlsbad Springs Community Association |
| CICW-FM | 101.1 FM | Centre Wellington | Centre Wellington Community Radio Inc |
| CFWN-FM | 89.7 FM | Northumberland County | Small Town Radio |
| CJBB-FM | 103.1 FM | Englehart | Northern Radio Corp. |
| CHES-FM | 91.7 FM | Erin | Erin Radio |
| CFRU-FM | 93.3 FM | Guelph | University of Guelph |
| CKHA-FM | 100.9 FM | Haliburton | Haliburton County Radio Association |
| CFBW-FM | 91.3 FM | Hanover | Bluewater Radio |
| CINN-FM | 91.1 FM | Hearst | Radio de l'Épinette Noire |
| CKAR-FM | 88.7 FM | Huntsville | Hunters Bay Radio Inc. |
| CJFL-FM | 104.7 FM | Iroquois Falls | |
| CKGN-FM | 89.7 FM | Kapuskasing | Radio communautaire KapNord |
| CHCR-FM | 102.9 FM | Killaloe | Homegrown Community Radio |
| CFRC-FM | 101.9 FM | Kingston | Radio Queens University |
| CFRM-FM | 100.7 FM | Little Current | Manitoulin Radio Communication |
| CHMO | 1450 AM | Moosonee | James Bay Broadcasting |
| CIWN-FM | 88.7 FM | Mount Forest | Saugeen Community Radio Inc. |
| CKRZ-FM | 100.3 FM | Ohsweken | Southern Onkwehon:we Nishinabec Indigenous Communications Society |
| CFPO-FM | 95.7 FM | Ottawa | First Peoples Radio Inc. |
| CJFO-FM | 94.5 FM | Ottawa | Radio de la communauté francophone d’Ottawa |
| CFRH-FM | 88.1 FM | Penetanguishene | Radio Huronie |
| CHLK-FM | 88.1 FM | Perth | Norm Wright and Brian Perkin |
| CFFF-FM | 92.7 FM | Peterborough | Trent Radio |
| CJPE-FM | 99.3 FM | Prince Edward County | County FM |
| CJHR-FM | 98.7 FM | Renfrew | Valley Heritage Radio |
| CJAI-FM | 101.3 FM | Stella | Amherst Island Radio |
| CKLU-FM | 96.7 FM | Greater Sudbury | CKLU Campus and Community Radio Station |
| CFPT-FM | 106.5 FM | Toronto | First Peoples Radio Inc. |
| CHHA | 1610 AM | Toronto | San Lorenzo Latin American Community Centre |
| CHOQ-FM | 105.1 FM | Toronto | Cooperative Radio-Toronto |
| CIUT-FM | 89.5 FM | Toronto | University of Toronto Community Radio-Toronto |
| VEF315 | 88.7 FM | Vankleek Hill | Jean Sarrazin |
| CHRZ-FM | 91.3 FM | Wasauksing First Nation | Wasauksing Communications Group |
| CKMS-FM | 102.7 FM | Waterloo | Radio Waterloo Inc. |
| CKWR-FM | 98.5 FM | Waterloo | Wired World Inc. |
| CJAM-FM | 99.1 FM | Windsor | CJAM FM |
| CIWS-FM | 102.9 FM | Whitchurch–Stouffville | WhiStle Community Radio |
== Quebec ==
| CFID-FM | 103.7 FM | Acton Vale | Radio Acton |
| VF2445 | 94.1 FM | Akulivik | Taqramiut Nipingat |
| CHOW-FM | 105.3 FM | Amos | Radio Boréale |
| CJRV-FM | 95.3 FM | L'Anse-à-Valleau | Radio Gaspésie |
| CFMF-FM | 103.1 FM | Fermont | La Radio communautaire de Fermont |
| VF2434 | 94.1 FM | Aupaluk | Taqramiut Nipingat |
| CKBN-FM | 90.5 FM | Bécancour | Coopérative de solidarité radio communautaire Nicolet-Yamaska/Bécancour |
| CIMB-FM | 95.1 FM | Betsiamites | Radio Ntetemuk |
| CFBS-FM | 89.9 FM | Blanc-Sablon | Radio Blanc-Sablon |
| CIDI-FM | 99.1 FM | Brome Lake | Radio communautaire missisquoi |
| CBMR-FM | 104.7 FM | Bromont | coopérative de Travail de la radio de Bromont |
| CIEU-FM | 94.9 FM | Carleton-sur-Mer | Diffusion communautaire Baie-des-Chaleurs |
| CHAI-FM | 101.9 FM | Châteauguay | Radio communautaire de Châteauguay |
| CHFG-FM | 101.1 FM | Chisasibi | Chisasibi Telecommunications Association |
| CIGN-FM | 96.7 FM | Coaticook | Radio coopérative de Coaticook, Coop de solidarité |
| CHME-FM | 94.9 FM | Les Escoumins | Radio Essipit Haute-Côte-Nord |
| CHIP-FM | 101.9 FM | Fort-Coulonge | Radio communautaire de Pontiac |
| CJRG-FM | 94.5 FM | Gaspé | Radio Gaspésie |
| CJEU (AM) | 1670 AM | Gatineau | Fondation Radio-Enfant |
| CHRG-FM | 107.1 FM | Gesgapegiag | Douglas Martin |
| CFXM-FM | 104.9 FM | Granby | Coopérative de travail de la radio de Granby |
| CFTH-FM-1 | 97.7 FM | Harrington Harbour | Radio communautaire de Harrington Harbour |
| CILE-FM | 95.1 FM | Havre-Saint-Pierre | Radio-Télévision communautaire Havre-Saint-Pierre |
| VF2013 | 104.7 FM | Havre-Saint-Pierre | Radio-Télévision communautaire Havre-Saint-Pierre |
| VF2441 | 94.1 FM | Inukjuak | Taqramiut Nipingat |
| CINY-FM | 97.9 FM | Inukjuak | Natturaliit Youth Committee |
| VF2447 | 94.1 FM | Ivujivik | Taqramiut Nipingat |
| CKRK-FM | 103.7 FM | Kahnawake | CKRK K-103 FM Mohawk Radio Kahnawake Association |
| VF2281 | 89.9 FM | Kangiqsualujjuaq | Jim Stewart |
| VF2443 | 94.1 FM | Kangiqsualujjuaq | Taqramiut Nipingat |
| VF2436 | 94.1 FM | Kangiqsujuaq | Taqramiut Nipingat |
| VF2437 | 94.1 FM | Kangirsuk | Taqramiut Nipingat |
| CJCK-FM | 89.9 FM | Kawawachikamach | Naskapi Northern Wind Radio |
| CKFF-FM | 104.1 FM | Kipawa | Kebaowek First Nation |
| VF2439 | 94.1 FM | Kuujjuaq | Taqramiut Nipingat |
| CKUJ-FM | 97.3 FM | Kuujjuaq | Société Kuujjuamiut |
| VF2321 | 98.3 FM | Kuujjuaq | Société Kuujjuamiut |
| VF2438 | 94.1 FM | Kuujjuarapik | Taqramiut Nipingat |
| VF2149 | 99.7 FM | Lac-Allard | Radio-Télévision communautaire Havre-Saint-Pierre |
| CFIN-FM | 100.5 FM | Lac-Etchemin | Radio Bellechasse |
| CHUT-FM | 95.3 FM | Lac-Simon | La Radio communautaire MF Lac-Simon |
| CJMD-FM | 96.9 FM | Lévis | Radio communautaire de Lévis |
| CHRQ-FM | 106.9 FM | Listuguj | Gespegewag Communications Society |
| CHAA-FM | 103.3 FM | Longueuil | La Radio communautaire de la Rive-Sud |
| CHMK-FM | 93.1 FM | Manawan | Corporation Radio Attikamek de Manawan |
| CHGA-FM | 97.3 FM | Maniwaki | Radio communautaire FM de la Haute-Gatineau |
| CHUK-FM | 107.3 FM | Mashteuiatsh | Corporation Médiatique Teuehikan |
| CHEF-FM | 99.9 FM | Matagami | Radio Matagami |
| CKAU-FM | 104.5 FM | Maliotenam | Corporation de Radio Kushapetsheken Apetuamiss Uashat |
| CKKE-FM | 89.9 FM | Mingan | Corporation de Radio montagnaise de Mingan |
| CINI-FM | 95.3 FM | Mistissini | CINI Radio FM |
| CIBL-FM | 101.5 FM | Montreal | Radio communautaire francophone de Montréal |
| CINQ-FM | 102.3 FM | Montreal | Radio communautaire multilingue de Montréal |
| CFNQ-FM | 89.1 FM | Natashquan | Corporation de Radio montagnaise de Natashquan |
| CKNA-FM | 104.1 FM | Natashquan | La Radio communautaire CKNA |
| CFNM-FM | 99.9 FM | Nemaska | Nemaska Radio Station |
| CHNT-FM | 92.3 FM | Notre-Dame-du-Nord | Minwadjimowin Algonquin Communication Society |
| CITK-FM | 89.9 FM | Obedjiwan | Corporation Tepatcimo Kitotakan |
| CKHQ-FM | 101.7 FM | Oka | Kanehsatake Communications Society |
| CIBE-FM | 90.1 FM | Pakuashipi | Corporation de Radio montagnaise de St-Augustin |
| VF2239 | 92.1 FM | Parent | Corporation municipale du Village de Parent |
| CKAG-FM | 100.1 FM | Pikogan | Société de communication Ikito Pikogan |
| CJBE-FM | 90.5 FM | Port-Menier | Radio Anticosti |
| VF2442 | 94.1 FM | Puvirnituq | Taqramiut Nipingat |
| VF2435 | 94.1 FM | Quaqtaq | Taqramiut Nipingat |
| CKIA-FM | 88.3 FM | Quebec City | Radio Basse-Ville |
| CKRL-FM | 89.1 FM | Quebec City | CKRL MF 89,1 inc |
| CIAU-FM | 103.1 FM | Radisson | Radio communautaire de Radisson |
| CKMN-FM | 96.5 FM | Rimouski | La radio communautaire du comté Rimouski et Mont-Joli |
| CJRE-FM | 97.9 FM | Rivière-au-Renard | Radio Gaspésie |
| CFLR-FM | 90.1 FM | La Romaine | Corporation de Radio Montagnaise de La Romaine |
| CHUN-FM | 98.3 FM | Rouyn-Noranda | La Radio communautaire MF Lac-Simon |
| CKAJ-FM | 92.5 FM | Saguenay | La Radio communautaire du Saguenay |
| CJAS-FM | 93.5 FM | Saint-Augustin (Côte-Nord) | La Radio communautaire de Rivière-Saint-Augustin |
| CFND-FM | 101.9 FM | Saint-Jérôme | Amie du Quartier |
| VF2446 | 94.1 FM | Salluit | Taqramiut Nipingat |
| CJCK-FM | 89.9 FM | Schefferville | Naskapi Northern Wind Radio |
| CIBO-FM | 100.5 FM | Senneterre | La Radio communautaire MF de Senneterre |
| CFUT-FM | 91.1 FM | Shawinigan | La radio campus communautaire francophone de Shawinigan |
| CFLX-FM | 95.5 FM | Sherbrooke | Radio communautaire de l'Estrie |
| CJMQ-FM | 88.9 FM | Sherbrooke | Incorporated as CJMQ Radio Bishop’s. Inc, but licensed as a community station |
| VF2444 | 94.1 FM | Tasiujaq | Taqramiut Nipingat |
| CJTB-FM | 93.1 FM | Tête-à-la-Baleine | Radio communautaire Tête-à-la-Baleine |
| VF2440 | 94.1 FM | Umiujaq | Taqramiut Nipingat |
| CJRH-FM | 92.5 FM | Waskaganish | Waskaganish Eeyou Telecommunications Association |
| CFNE-FM | 93.9 FM | Waswanipi | Waswanipi Communications Society |
| CHPH-FM | 99.9 FM | Wemindji | Wemindji Telecommunications Association |
| CIHW-FM | 100.3 FM | Wendake | Comité de la radio communautaire Huronne |
| CKRQ-FM | 96.5 FM | Whapmagoostui | Whapmagoostui Aeyouch Telecommunications |
| CIAX-FM | 98.3 FM | Windsor | Carrefour jeunesse emploi-Comté Johnson |
== Saskatchewan ==
| CFRG-FM | 93.1 FM | Gravelbourg | Association communautaire fransaskoise de Gravelbourg |
| CJTR-FM | 91.3 FM | Regina | Radius Communications |
| CFCR-FM | 90.5 FM | Saskatoon | Community Radio Society of Saskatoon |
| CFZY-FM | 104.1 FM | Stockholm | Jody Herperger |
| CKZP-FM | 102.7 FM | Zenon Park | Radio Zenon Park |
== Yukon ==
| CFET-FM | 106.7 FM | Tagish | Robert G. Hopkins |
| CFYT-FM | 106.9 FM | Dawson City | Dawson City Community Radio Society |
| CHON-FM | 98.1 FM | Whitehorse | Northern Native Broadcasting, Yukon |
| CIKO-FM | 97.5 FM | Carcross | Carcross Community School |
| CJUC-FM | 92.5 FM | Whitehorse | Utilities Consumers Group Society |

== See also ==
- Community radio in Canada
