= Association des radiodiffuseurs communautaires du Québec =

The Alliance des radios communautaires du Québec (ARCQ) is a Canadian organization, which serves as a coordinating body for community radio stations in Quebec.

Founded in 1978, the organization supports the development and maintenance of French-language community radio in the province through lobbying, advocacy, management support, training and syndication of programming.

The organization cooperates with, but operates separately from, the Alliance des radios communautaires du Canada for French-language community radio stations in the rest of Canada. In 2018, the two organizations held their first-ever joint conference for all French-language community radio stations across Canada.

== Member stations ==
- Amos - CHOW-FM
- Bécancour - CKBN-FM
- Blanc-Sablon - CFBS-FM
- Cap-aux-Meules - CFIM-FM
- Carleton-sur-Mer - CIEU-FM
- Châteauguay - CHAI-FM
- Coaticook - CIGN-FM
- Fermont - CFMF-FM
- Fort-Coulonge - CHIP-FM
- Gaspé - CJRG-FM
- Havre-Saint-Pierre - CILE-FM
- Lac-Etchemin - CFIN-FM
- Lasalle - CKVL-FM
- Lebel-sur-Quévillon - CKCJ-FM
- Lévis - CJMD-FM
- Longueuil - CHAA-FM
- Louiseville - CHHO-FM
- Maniwaki - CHGA-FM
- Matagami - CHEF-FM
- Montreal - CIBL-FM
- Natashquan - CKNA-FM
- Port-Menier - CJBE-FM
- Quebec City - CKIA-FM
- Quebec City - CKRL-FM
- Radisson - CIAU-FM
- Rimouski - CKMN-FM
- Saguenay - CKAJ-FM
- Saint-Gabriel-de-Brandon - CFNJ-FM
- Saint-Hilarion - CIHO-FM
- Senneterre - CIBO-FM
- Sherbrooke - CFLX-FM
- Tête-à-la-Baleine - CJTB-FM
