= List of unconstituted localities in Quebec =

An unconstituted locality (French: localité non constituée) is a specific type of designated place in Quebec, a small community that has not been constituted as a municipality (Quebec uses the term "constituted" rather than "incorporated").

Designated places are defined by provinces and territories of Canada in cooperation with Statistics Canada, and Quebec has two kinds: dissolved municipalities (French: municipalité dissoute) and unconstituted localities. Dissolved municipalities are often the result of mergers and amalgamations (see Municipal history of Quebec and Category:Former municipalities in Quebec), and in some cases Statistics Canada chooses to keep tracking population and other figures for census purposes over the territory of the pre-merger municipality. However, unconstituted localities never had the status of municipality to begin with.

An unconstituted locality will necessarily exist on the territory of some municipality (or unorganized territory).

== Unconstituted localities ==
Name	Municipality	RCM	Region
Beaucanton	Baie-James	None	Nord-du-Québec
Chevery	Côte-Nord-du-Golfe-du-Saint-Laurent	Le Golfe-du-Saint-Laurent	Côte-Nord
Harrington Harbour	Côte-Nord-du-Golfe-du-Saint-Laurent	Le Golfe-du-Saint-Laurent	Côte-Nord
Kegashka	Côte-Nord-du-Golfe-du-Saint-Laurent	Le Golfe-du-Saint-Laurent	Côte-Nord
La Romaine	Côte-Nord-du-Golfe-du-Saint-Laurent	Le Golfe-du-Saint-Laurent	Côte-Nord
Lourdes-de-Blanc-Sablon	Blanc-Sablon	Le Golfe-du-Saint-Laurent	Côte-Nord
Old Fort	Bonne-Espérance	Le Golfe-du-Saint-Laurent	Côte-Nord
Radisson	Baie-James	None	Nord-du-Québec
Saint-Jean-de-Dieu	Saint-Jean-de-Dieu	Les Basques	Bas-Saint-Laurent
Tête-à-la-Baleine	Côte-Nord-du-Golfe-du-Saint-Laurent	Le Golfe-du-Saint-Laurent	Côte-Nord
Val-Paradis	Baie-James	None	Nord-du-Québec
Villebois	Baie-James	None	Nord-du-Québec

- Kegashka is sometimes also written Kegaska.
- La Romaine should not be confused with Unamen Shipu, the neighbouring Indian reserve of the same name
- The unconstituted locality of Saint-Jean-de-Dieu should not be confused with the municipality of Saint-Jean-de-Dieu, within which it lies.
