= Côte-Nord-du-Golfe-du-Saint-Laurent =

- Municipality
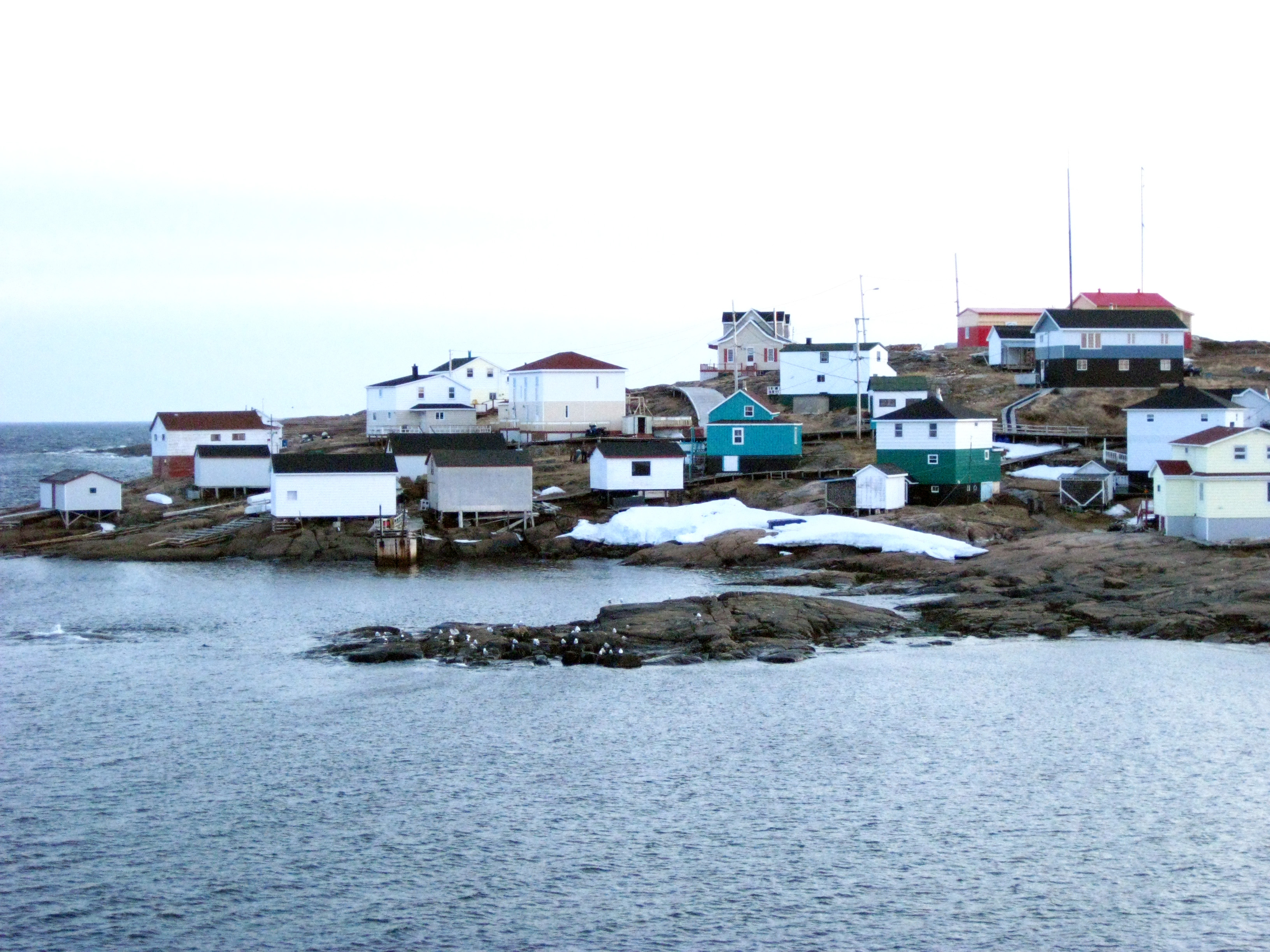
- The village of Harrington Harbour

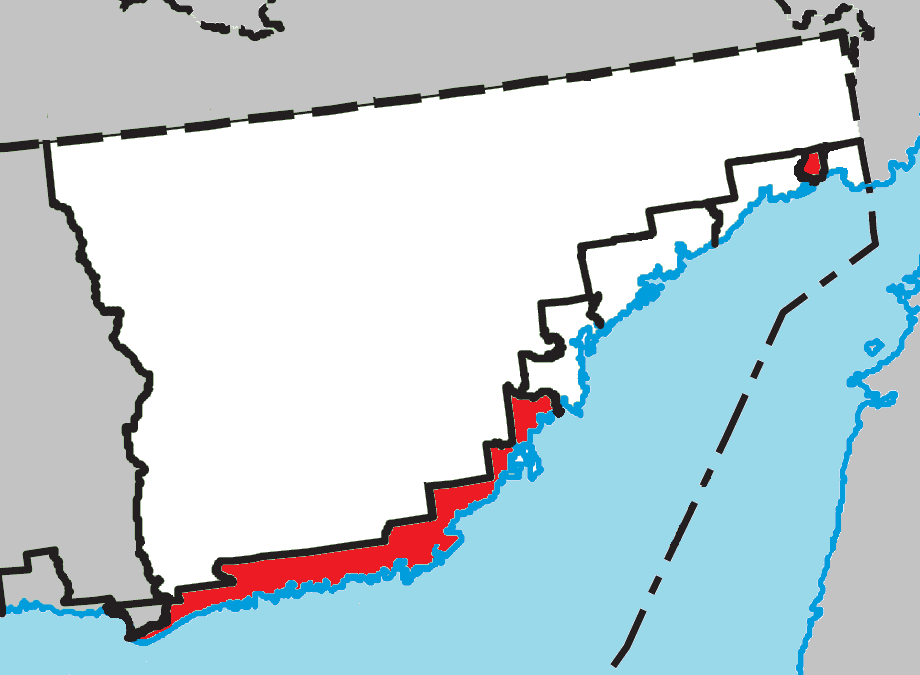
- Location within Le Golfe-du-Saint-Laurent RCM

- Location in Côte-Nord Region of Quebec
- Coordinates: 50°28′N 59°36′W
- Country: Canada
- Province: Quebec
- Region: Côte-Nord
- RCM: Le Golfe-du-Saint-Laurent
- Constituted: June 22, 1963

Government
  - Administrator: Darlene Rowsell Roberts
  - Federal riding: Côte-Nord—Kawawachikamach—Nitassinan
  - Prov. riding: Duplessis

Area
  - Total: 3,061.95 km^{2} (1,182.23 sq mi)
  - Land: 2,597.05 km^{2} (1,002.73 sq mi)

Population (2021)
  - Total: 787
  - Density: 0.3/km^{2} (0.78/sq mi)
  - Pop (2016-21): ▼8.1%
  - Dwellings: 430
- Time zone: UTC-4 (AST)
- Postal code(s): G0G 1G0
- Area codes: 418 and 581
- Highways: R-138
- Website: mcngsl.ca

Côte-Nord-du-Golfe-du-Saint-Laurent (French pronunciation: [kot nɔʁ dy ɡɔlf dy sɛ̃ lɔʁɑ̃]) is a municipality in the regional county municipality of Le Golfe-du-Saint-Laurent in the Côte-Nord region of the province of Quebec, Canada. The municipality consists of two non-contiguous areas, both along the shores of the Gulf of Saint Lawrence. The larger main part stretches from the Natashquan River to the Gros Mécatina River and includes all populated places. The eastern part is a small section between Middle Bay and Brador.

== History ==
The Municipality of Côte-Nord-du-Golfe-Saint-Laurent was incorporated in 1963 and originally extended along the shores of the Saint Lawrence from the Natashquan River to the Newfoundland and Labrador provincial border, some 5,240 square kilometres (2,020 sq mi) roughly corresponding to the Basse-Côte-Nord territory. However, with an isolated population scattered over a large area devoid of roads, the municipality did not have an elected municipal council and was managed by an appointed administrator headquartered in Chevery.

Starting in 1990, a restructuring plan was enacted that carved up Côte-Nord-du-Golfe-Saint-Laurent into several additional municipalities. That year, the municipalities of Bonne-Espérance and Blanc-Sablon were formed, followed by the Municipality of Saint-Augustin on December 30, 1992, and finally the municipality of Gros-Mécatina on December 22, 1993.

On May 8, 1996, the municipality's name was officially adjusted to Côte-Nord-du-Golfe-du-Saint-Laurent.

== Communities ==
The municipality includes the communities of Chevery, Harrington Harbour, Kegaska, and Tête-à-la-Baleine.

It also includes the following abandoned settlements and ghost towns, in order from west to east: Musquaro, Wolf Bay, Aylmer Sound, Ettamiau, Pointe Amouri, Barachois, Chez Menneau, and Boulet's (also known as Bully's).

=== Chevery ===
Chevery (50°28′07″N 59°36′58″W) is the administrative centre of the municipality, located at the mouth of the Nétagamiou River. Its population in the Canada 2011 Census was 251.

=== Harrington Harbour ===
Harrington Harbour (50°30′00″N 59°28′47″W) was founded near the end of the 19th century by fishermen from Newfoundland. The primary activity is commercial fishing for crabs, lobster, turbot, halibut, cod, and lumpfish. Its population in the Canada 2011 Census was 261.

=== Kegaska ===
Kegaska (50°11′01″N 61°16′21″W) is the westernmost community in the municipality. Its population in the Canada 2011 Census was 138, mostly anglophone settlers from Anticosti Island.

=== Tête-à-la-Baleine ===
Tête-à-la-Baleine (50°42′10″N 59°19′23″W), occasionally known as Whale Head in English, was settled in the 19th century after Michael Kenty bought the local trading post from the Labrador Company. Its population in the Canada 2011 Census was 129.

=== Musquaro ===
The ghost town of Musquaro (50°12′58″N 61°03′50″W) is at the mouth of the Musquaro River, between Kegaska and La Romaine. Identified as Mascoüarou on Louis Jolliet's map of 1694, the name went through numerous spelling changes, such as Nasquirou, Maskouaro, and Mahkuanu. Its root meaning is "black bear tail" and may refer to the foothills of Mount Mascoüarou as shown Jolliet's map.

It was the site of a fortified trading post, established in 1710, and a catholic mission. In 1780, the post was on the territory granted to the Labrador Company of Quebec. 23 years later, the franchise went to the North West Company which in turn was sold to the Hudson's Bay Company in 1821. Closed for a brief time in 1859, the post remained occupied until 1925 after which it closed permanently.

== Demographics ==
In the 2021 Census of Population conducted by Statistics Canada, Côte-Nord-du-Golfe-du-Saint-Laurent had a population of 787 living in 361 of its 430 total private dwellings, a change of −8.1% from its 2016 population of 856. With a land area of 2,597.05 km^{2} (1,002.73 sq mi), it had a population density of 0.3/km^{2} (0.8/sq mi) in 2021.

Canada census – Côte-Nord-du-Golfe-du-Saint-Laurent community profile

	2021	2016	2011
Population	787 (-8.1% from 2016)	856 (-11.8% from 2011)	971 (-5.5% from 2006)
Land area	2,597.05 km^{2} (1,002.73 sq mi)	2,835.05 km^{2} (1,094.62 sq mi)	2,845.04 km^{2} (1,098.48 sq mi)
Population density	0.3/km^{2} (0.78/sq mi)	0.3/km^{2} (0.78/sq mi)	0.3/km^{2} (0.78/sq mi)
Median age	54.4 (M: 55.2, F: 53.6)	50.7 (M: 51.2, F: 50.2)	46.3 (M: 46.7, F: 45.7)
Private dwellings	430 (total) 361 (occupied)	442 (total) 361 (occupied)	471 (total)
Median household income	$73,500	$75,840	$60,880

Notes: 2011 income data for this area has been suppressed for data quality or confidentiality reasons.
References: 2021 2016 2011

Historical Census Data - Côte-Nord-du-Golfe-du-Saint-Laurent, Quebec

Year	Pop.	±%
1966	4,316	—
1971	5,108	+18.4%
1976	4,771	−6.6%
1981	5,176	+8.5%
1986	5,315	+2.7%
1991	2,756	−48.1%

Year	Pop.	±%
1996	1,214	−56.0%
2001	1,183	−2.6%
2006	1,028	−13.1%
2011	971	−5.5%
2016	856	−11.8%
2021	787	−8.1%

Population counts are not adjusted for boundary changes in 1990 and 1992.
Source: Statistics Canada

Canada Census Mother Tongue - Côte-Nord-du-Golfe-du-Saint-Laurent, Quebec
Census	Total	French			English			French & English			Other		
Year	Responses	Count	Trend	Pop %	Count	Trend	Pop %	Count	Trend	Pop %	Count	Trend	Pop %
2016	840	280	▼12.5%	33.3%	540	▼11.5%	64.3%	15	▼25.0%	1.8%	5	0.0%	0.6%
2011	955	320	▲7.8%	33.5%	610	▼14.1%	63.9%	20	▲50.0%	2.1%	5	▲ n/a%	0.5%
2006	1,015	295	▼22.4%	29.1%	710	▼7.8%	70.0%	10	▼33.3%	1.0%	0	0.0%	0.0%
2001	1,165	380	▼8.4%	32.6%	770	▲2.6%	66.1%	15	▼40.0%	1.3%	0	0.0%	0.0%
1996	1,190	415	n/a	34.9%	750	n/a	63.0%	25	n/a	2.1%	0	n/a	0.0%

== Transportation ==
The municipality is served by three small local airports, Chevery Airport, Kegaska Airport and Tête-à-la-Baleine Airport. Harrington Harbour is served by a heliport, but does not have its own full airport.

Harrington Harbour is located on a small island which has no cars or roads, and all transportation in the community is by bicycle. Each mainland community has local road access — however, no roads currently connect one community to another, the entire municipality is isolated from the provincial highway network, and ferries or taxi boats must be used to travel between the communities or to the rest of the province.

In recent years the municipality has lobbied for Highway 138, which currently ends at Kégaska, to be extended through the area. The provincial government has announced a feasibility study, although no construction schedule has been announced to date.

== Climate ==
Although located at the same latitude as Cornwall or Vancouver, the cold Labrador Current gives Côte-Nord-du-Golfe-du-Saint-Laurent a subarctic climate (Köppen Dfc), a little short of a humid continental climate (Dfb). Winters are cold and very snowy due to the influence of the Icelandic Low to the east, with mean snowfall averaging 2.94 metres (115.7 in) and extreme cover of 2.00 metres or 78.74 inches on 10 March 1994. In summer, maritime includes is much more pronounced than in winter and cools average July temperatures by about 5 °C (9.0 °F) compared to inland cities like Regina or Winnipeg.

Climate data for Tête-à-la-Baleine
Month	Jan	Feb	Mar	Apr	May	Jun	Jul	Aug	Sep	Oct	Nov	Dec	Year
Record high °C (°F)	6.1 (43.0)	6.1 (43.0)	15 (59)	12.8 (55.0)	21 (70)	32.8 (91.0)	31.7 (89.1)	30 (86)	28.9 (84.0)	20.6 (69.1)	16.1 (61.0)	8.9 (48.0)	32.8 (91.0)
Mean daily maximum °C (°F)	−8.3 (17.1)	−7.1 (19.2)	−1.8 (28.8)	3.3 (37.9)	8.8 (47.8)	14.4 (57.9)	18.8 (65.8)	18.7 (65.7)	14.5 (58.1)	8.3 (46.9)	2.1 (35.8)	−5.2 (22.6)	5.6 (42.1)
Daily mean °C (°F)	−14 (7)	−12.9 (8.8)	−7.2 (19.0)	−0.7 (30.7)	4.6 (40.3)	9.7 (49.5)	14 (57)	13.9 (57.0)	9.8 (49.6)	4.1 (39.4)	−1.6 (29.1)	−10.1 (13.8)	0.8 (33.4)
Mean daily minimum °C (°F)	−19.6 (−3.3)	−18.6 (−1.5)	−12.5 (9.5)	−4.7 (23.5)	0.4 (32.7)	4.9 (40.8)	9.1 (48.4)	9.1 (48.4)	5.1 (41.2)	−0.1 (31.8)	−5.4 (22.3)	−14.9 (5.2)	−3.9 (25.0)
Record low °C (°F)	−38.9 (−38.0)	−39.5 (−39.1)	−35 (−31)	−27 (−17)	−13.3 (8.1)	−2.8 (27.0)	−0.6 (30.9)	−1.1 (30.0)	−5 (23)	−14.4 (6.1)	−22.2 (−8.0)	−35.6 (−32.1)	−39.5 (−39.1)
Average precipitation mm (inches)	78.1 (3.07)	52.6 (2.07)	73.1 (2.88)	78.5 (3.09)	97.7 (3.85)	112.1 (4.41)	111.4 (4.39)	111.9 (4.41)	128.3 (5.05)	129.9 (5.11)	116.9 (4.60)	102.8 (4.05)	1,193.3 (46.98)
Average rainfall mm (inches)	19.5 (0.77)	7.3 (0.29)	25.9 (1.02)	47.2 (1.86)	92.3 (3.63)	111.7 (4.40)	111.4 (4.39)	111.9 (4.41)	128.3 (5.05)	124.6 (4.91)	85.4 (3.36)	33.3 (1.31)	898.8 (35.4)
Average snowfall cm (inches)	58.6 (23.1)	45.3 (17.8)	47.2 (18.6)	31.4 (12.4)	5.4 (2.1)	0.4 (0.2)	0.0 (0.0)	0.0 (0.0)	0.0 (0.0)	5.2 (2.0)	31.5 (12.4)	69.5 (27.4)	294.5 (116)
Average precipitation days (≥ 0.2 mm)	9.7	7.2	8.2	8.0	8.6	8.8	9.0	9.4	10.3	10.5	9.8	10.8	110.3
Average rainy days (≥ 0.2 mm)	1.6	0.8	1.8	4.0	7.9	8.8	9.0	9.4	10.3	9.9	5.8	2.4	71.7
Average snowy days (≥ 0.2 cm)	8.4	6.6	6.7	4.1	0.9	0.0	0.0	0.0	0.0	0.8	4.5	8.7	40.7
Source: Environment Canada

== Local government ==
List of former mayors:

- Gaston Bergeron (1963–1970)
- Jean-Paul Daigle (1970–1972)
- Henri-Paul Boudreau (1972–1976)
- Richmond Monger (1976–2011)
- Darlene Rowsell-Roberts (2011–present)

== Media ==
Two community radio stations, CFTH-FM-1 in Harrington Harbour and CJTB-FM in Tête-à-la-Baleine, operate in the municipality. CFTH also has rebroadcasters in Kegaska and Mutton Bay. The municipality is also served by rebroadcasters of Première Chaîne's CBSI-FM in Harrington Harbour and Tête-à-la-Baleine, and by a rebroadcaster of CBC Radio One's CBVE-FM in Harrington Harbour.

Télévision de Radio-Canada's CJBR-TV has rebroadcasters in Harrington Harbour and Tête-à-la-Baleine, and CBC Television's CBMT has a rebroadcaster in Harrington Harbour. The municipality does not receive any of Canada's commercial broadcast television networks, English or French, over the air.

== Education ==
Commission scolaire du Littoral operates:

- Netagamiou School (anglophone and francophone) - Chevery
- Gabriel-Dionne School (francophone) - Tête-à-la-Baleine
- Harrington School (anglophone) - Harrington Harbour
- Kegaska School (anglophone) - Kegaska
- Marie-Sarah School for adults - La Romaine
  - Its school program for children was suspended in 2014. It was formerly a francophone school.

== See also ==
- List of anglophone communities in Quebec
- List of municipalities in Quebec
