= Alex J. Walling =

Canadian sportscaster (1946–2023)

- Born: 1946; Quebec City, Quebec, Canada
- Died: November 25, 2023 (aged 77); Halifax, Nova Scotia, Canada
- Occupations: Sports analyst, broadcaster

Alex John Walling (1946 – November 25, 2023), also known as A.J. Walling, was a Canadian sports analyst and broadcaster. Well known for his distinctive voice and opinionated commentary, he was the Atlantic Canadian sports reporter for TSN, a position he held for nine years. He contributed to a regular sports column for the TSN web page and was heard each weekday morning on CIOE-FM (97.5 FM). He was also the founder and owner of CJQC-FM in Liverpool, Nova Scotia.

== Broadcasting career ==
Walling's career began in 1965 as a newspaper reporter in Quebec City. He soon moved into radio and, in 1972, he moved to Halifax where he began working for CHNS. He began the first full-time sports talk show there in 1972 with a show that ran on Sunday nights from 10:30 until midnight. As the first full-time sports director for CHNS, his first major assignment was in Edmonton, Alberta where he covered the Dartmouth Dairy Queen team, which was vying that year for the National Softball title. He also covered major sporting events, including the 1972 Summit Series where he was one of the first to talk to Paul Henderson moments after the historic "goal heard around the world". Walling reported on Atlantic University football for more than twenty years.

In 1984, he was president and general manager of Western Broadcasting in Corner Brook, Newfoundland where he started CKWK 1340, an AM radio station now operating as CKXX-FM. Three years later, in 1987, he became general manager of CJGL-FM in Swift Current, Saskatchewan. While his family remained in Corner Brook, for several months he commuted 4,000 miles (6,400 km) between the two stations.

In 1988, he became the first sports anchor at the independent Halifax and Saint John-based MITV television station (now part of Global). That same year, he founded the Atlantic Media Institute in Halifax, which he sold in 2000. From 1994 to 2000, he also had a one-hour sports talk show called A.J., Harv & Company on a Halifax community station television. He left the show upon his retirement; however, the retirement was short lived. In Liverpool, he founded Queens County Community Radio, which first went on air in 2008 and received CRTC approval in 2009. In 2012, he sold his interest in the community radio station.

In July 2015, Walling became the host of the Cobequid Radio Society's CIOE-FM morning drive show, broadcast live from Lower Sackville each weekday.

== Personal life and death ==
Walling was married to Kathleen Davis of Brooklyn, Nova Scotia, who died in 2014.

Walling died in Halifax on November 25, 2023, at the age of 77.
