= CIAU =

The letters CIAU may mean any of the following:

- CIAU-FM 103.1, a radio station in Radisson, Quebec
- Canadian Interuniversity Athletics Union, now known as U Sports
- CIA University, a training facility of the U.S. Central Intelligence Agency
