= Val-Paradis, Quebec =

Val-Paradis
- Unconstituted locality
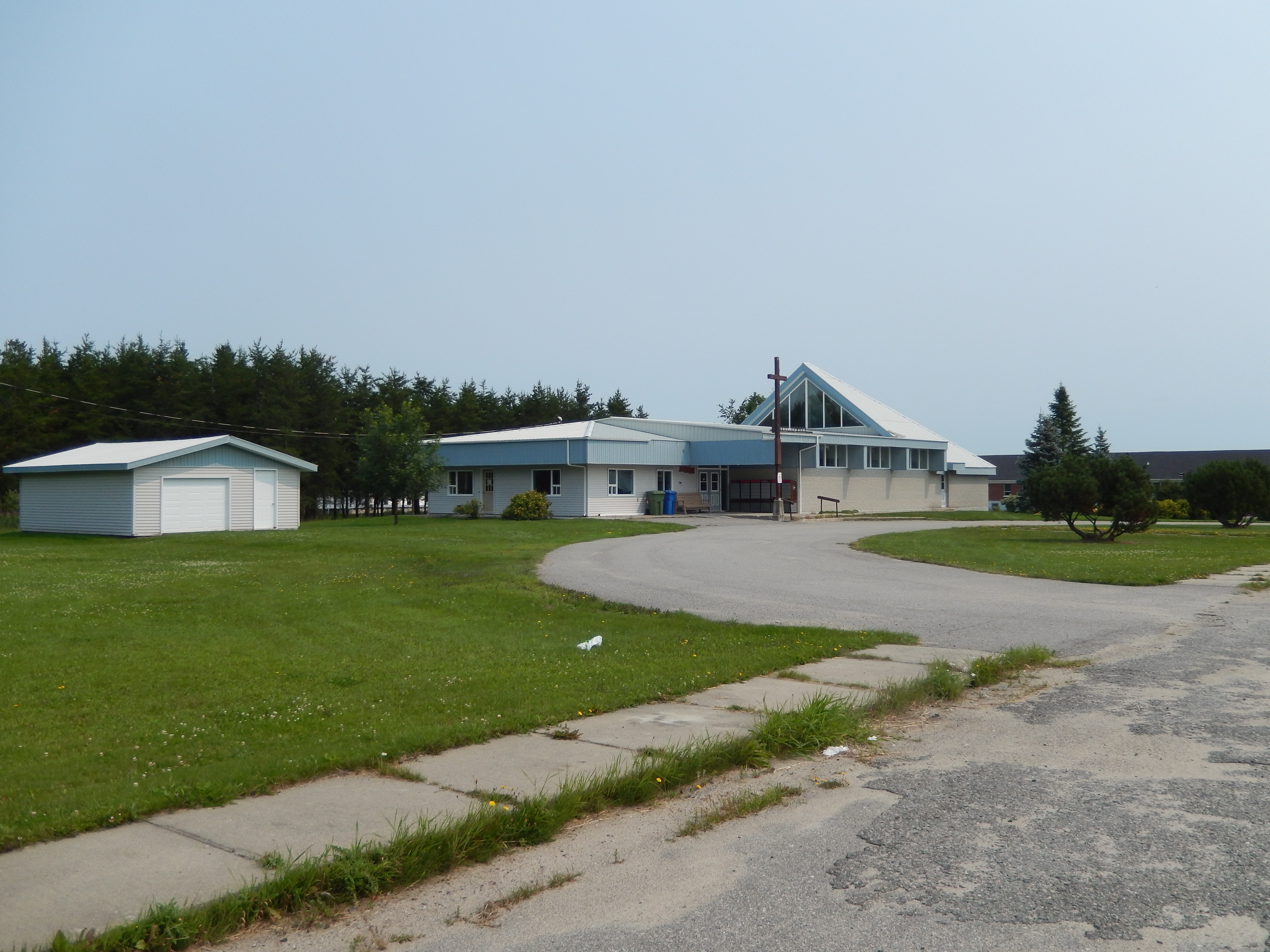
- Church of Val-Paradis

- Location within Quebec
- Coordinates: 49.15414°N 79.29011°W
- Country: Canada
- Province: Quebec
- Region: Nord-du-Québec
- TE: Jamésie
- Municipality: Baie-James

Government
  - Federal riding: Abitibi—Témiscamingue
  - Prov. riding: Ungava

Area
  - Land: 10.94 km^{2} (4.22 sq mi)

Population (2011)
  - Total: 91
  - Density: 8.3/km^{2} (21/sq mi)
  - Change (2006–11): ▼9.0%
  - Dwellings: 36
- Time zone: UTC−5 (EST)
  - Summer (DST): UTC−4 (EDT)

Val-Paradis (French pronunciation: [val paʁadi]) is an unconstituted locality within the municipality of Baie-James in the Nord-du-Québec region of Quebec, Canada.

== Demographics ==
In the 2021 Census of Population conducted by Statistics Canada, Val-Paradis had a population of 186 living in 79 of its 84 total private dwellings, a change of 20% from its 2016 population of 155. With a land area of 38.48 km^{2} (14.86 sq mi), it had a population density of 4.8/km^{2} (12.5/sq mi) in 2021.
