= CHHO-FM =

Radio station in Louiseville, Quebec

Coordinates: 46°18′48.96″N 72°56′8.88″W

CHHO
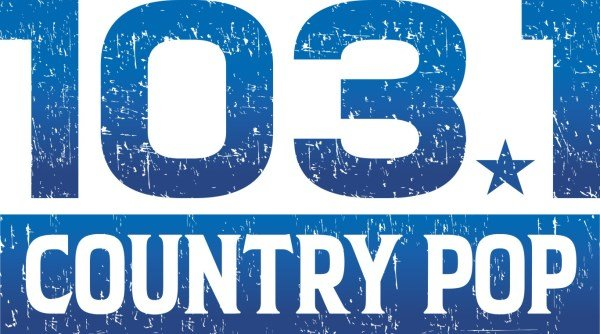

Louiseville, Quebec; Canada
- Frequency: 103.1 MHz
- Branding: Country Pop 103.1

Programming
- Language: French
- Format: community radio

Ownership
- Owner: La Coop de Solidarité Radio Communautaire de la MRC de Maskinongé
- Sister stations: CFUT-FM

Technical information
- Class: A
- ERP: vertical polarization only: 2.35 kilowatts average 4.24 kilowatts peak
- HAAT: 36.8 metres (121 ft)

Links
- Webcast: Country Pop (online stream)
- Website: countrypop1031.com

Country Pop 103.1 is a French-language community radio format which operates at 103.1 and 92.9 MHz (FM) in Louiseville, Quebec, Canada. Owned by La Coop de Solidarité Radio Communautaire de la MRC de Maskinongé, the station earned approval by the Canadian Radio-television and Telecommunications Commission (CRTC) on July 28, 2005.

CHHO-FM Previous Logo

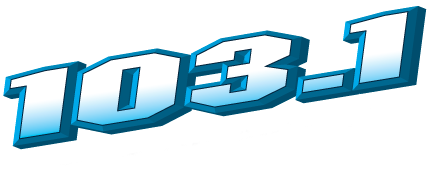
103.1 logo until March 9, 2020

The station is a member of the Association des radiodiffuseurs communautaires du Québec.
