= CKTZ-FM =

Radio station in Cortes Island, British Columbia

- Cortes Island; Canada
- Frequency: 89.5 MHz

Technical information
- Transmitter coordinates: 50.0931°N 124.9803°W

Links
- Webcast: Listen Live

CKTZ-FM is a radio station which operates a community radio format on the frequency 89.5 MHz (FM) in Cortes Island, British Columbia, Canada.

== History ==
On October 18, 2011, Cortes Community Radio Society received approval from the Canadian Radio-television and Telecommunications Commission (CRTC) to operate a new FM community radio station at Cortes Island.

== See also ==
- List of community radio stations in Canada
