= Harrington Harbour =

- Unconstituted locality
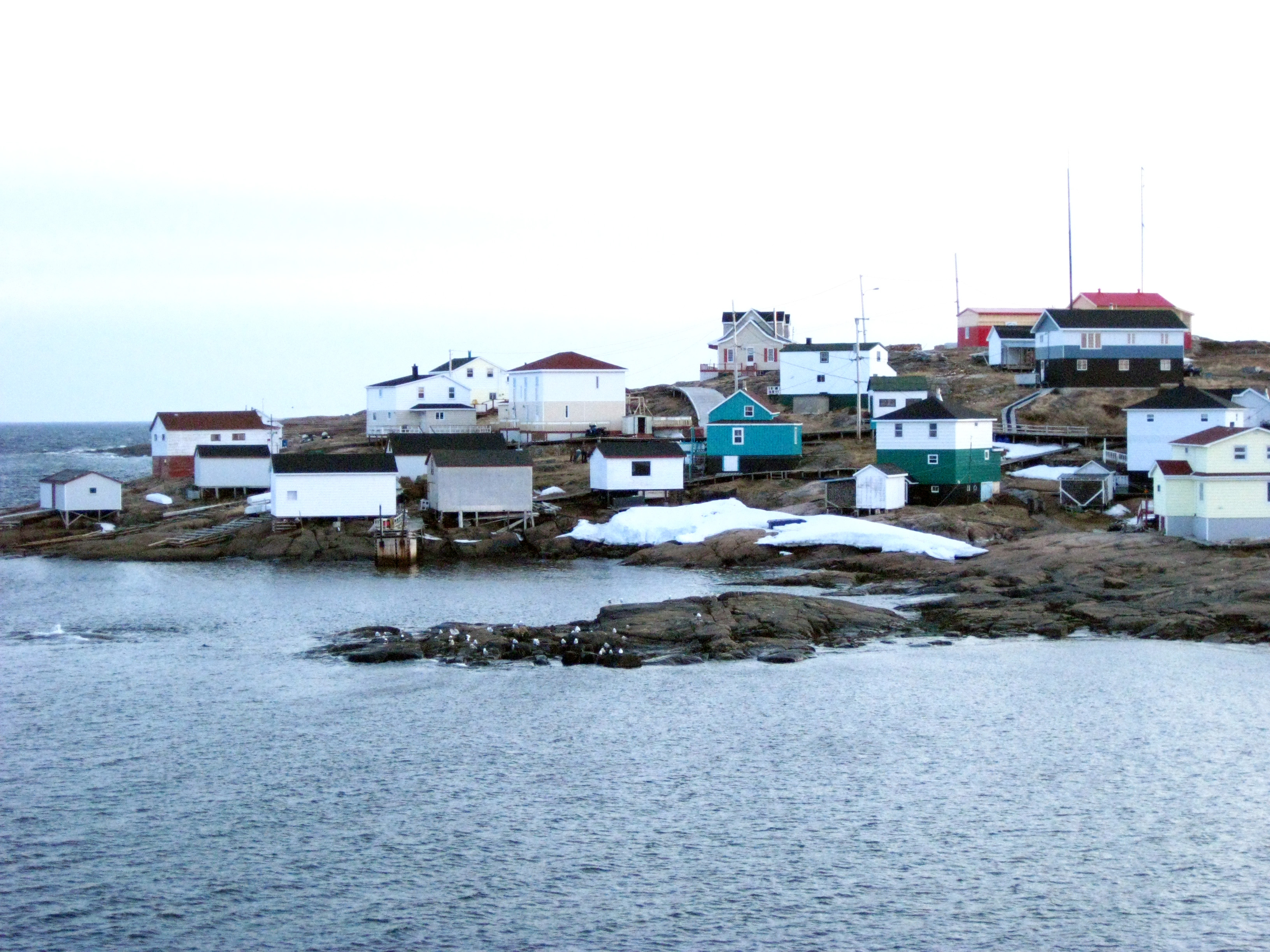

- Location within Quebec
- Coordinates: 50°30′00″N 59°28′47″W
- Country: Canada
- Province: Quebec
- Region: Côte-Nord
- RCM: Le Golfe-du-Saint-Laurent
- Municipality: Côte-Nord-du-Golfe-du-Saint-Laurent
- Named for: Charles Stanhope, 3rd Earl of Harrington

Government
  - Federal riding: Côte-Nord—Kawawachikamach—Nitassinan
  - Prov. riding: Duplessis

Area
  - Land: 2.31 km^{2} (0.89 sq mi)

Population (2021)
  - Total: 205
  - Density: 88.7/km^{2} (230/sq mi)
  - Change (2016–21): ▼ −10.5%
  - Dwellings: 92
- Time zone: UTC−04:00 (AST)
- Postal code(s): G0G 1N0
- Area codes: 418 and 581

Harrington Harbour is an unconstituted locality within the municipality of Côte-Nord-du-Golfe-du-Saint-Laurent in the Côte-Nord region of Quebec, Canada.

== History ==
Harrington Harbour was founded near the end of the 19th century by fishermen from Newfoundland. The primary activity is commercial fishing for crabs, lobster, turbot, halibut, and cod. Harrington Harbour was named after Charles Stanhope, 3rd Earl of Harrington.

It is also known locally as "Hospital Island", from its earlier role as a medical centre for the area. Harrington Harbour is a small village on average 300 residents. Harrington Harbour was originally settled by Newfoundland families in search of fish stocks in the second half of the 19th century. Dr. Wilfred Grenfell, founder of the famous medical mission in the region, visited Harrington Harbour starting in the late 19th century. Grenfell built a hospital on the island, earning the village its nickname of Hospital Island.

Local tradition claims that this is the island on which 16th century French noblewoman Marguerite de La Rocque was marooned by her relative Jean-François Roberval as punishment for an affair. "Marguerite's Cave" is one of the attractions on the island. Another attraction is the Jacques Cartier Monument, commemorating the French explorer and surveyor of the Gulf of Saint Lawrence.

== Present day ==
Today, fishing is still the main activity, with a bustling public wharf, and fishing cooperative.

Harrington Harbour Heliport is located in the village and wharf facilities located in the village are also used to service the village of Chevery, where Chevery Airport is located.

Models, panels and local artifacts interpret traditional activities, fishing, and local history.

The village was the principal filming location for the Quebec film Seducing Doctor Lewis (La Grande séduction).

== Waterway ==
Ports of the Gulf of St. Lawrence, on the Côte-Nord Shore: Blanc-Sablon, Harrington Harbor, Natashquan, Havre-Saint-Pierre, Mingan, Port-Menier (Anticosti Island), Cap-aux-Meules (Îles-de-la-Madeleine).

== Demographics ==
In the 2021 Census of Population conducted by Statistics Canada, Harrington Harbour had a population of 205 living in 83 of its 92 total private dwellings, a change of −10.5% from its 2016 population of 229. With a land area of 2.31 km^{2} (0.89 sq mi), it had a population density of 88.7/km^{2} (229.8/sq mi) in 2021.

== Education ==
Commission scolaire du Littoral operates Harrington School (anglophone) in Harrington Harbour.
