= CKCJ-FM =

Radio station in Lebel-sur-Quévillon, Quebec

- Lebel-sur-Quévillon, Quebec; Canada
- Frequency: 97.9 FM

Programming
- Language: French

Ownership
- Owner: Le son du 49e

History
- First air date: 2018

Technical information
- Class: LP
- ERP: 50 watts
- HAAT: 33.8 meters (111 ft)

Links
- Website: www.ckcj.ca

CKCJ-FM is a Canadian radio station, broadcasting at 97.9 FM in Lebel-sur-Quévillon, Quebec. Owned and operated by Le son du 49e, the station broadcasts a community radio format.

The station was licensed by the Canadian Radio-television and Telecommunications Commission in 2016, and commenced broadcasting in 2018.

The station is a member of the Association des radiodiffuseurs communautaires du Québec.
