= Villebois, Quebec =

Villebois
- Unconstituted locality
- Location within Quebec
- Coordinates: 49°06′N 79°09′W
- Country: Canada
- Province: Quebec
- Region: Nord-du-Québec
- TE: Jamésie
- Municipality: Baie-James

Government
  - Federal riding: Abitibi—Témiscamingue
  - Prov. riding: Ungava

Area
  - Land: 9.12 km^{2} (3.52 sq mi)

Population (2011)
  - Total: 143
  - Density: 15.7/km^{2} (41/sq mi)
  - Change (2006–11): ▲11.7%
  - Dwellings: 81
- Time zone: UTC−5 (EST)
  - Summer (DST): UTC−4 (EDT)

Villebois is an unconstituted locality within the municipality of Baie-James in the Nord-du-Québec region of Quebec, Canada.

== Demographics ==
In the 2021 Census of Population conducted by Statistics Canada, Villebois had a population of 173 living in 77 of its 85 total private dwellings, a change of 10.2% from its 2016 population of 157. With a land area of 17.78 km^{2} (6.86 sq mi), it had a population density of 9.7/km^{2} (25.2/sq mi) in 2021.
