= CFIM-FM =

French radio station in Quebec, Canada

Coordinates: 47°22′57″N 61°55′09″W

- Les Îles-de-la-Madeleine, Quebec; Canada
- Frequency: 92.7 MHz

Ownership
- Owner: Diffusion Communications des Iles, Inc.

History
- First air date: 1981

Technical information
- Class: B
- ERP: 6.3 kilowatts
- HAAT: 177 metres (581 ft)

Links
- Webcast: CFIM listen online
- Website: www.cfim.ca

CFIM-FM is a French language community radio station that operates at 92.7 FM in Les Îles-de-la-Madeleine, Quebec, Canada.

The station signed on in 1981 and is currently owned by Diffusion Communications des Iles Inc.

The station is a member of the Association des radiodiffuseurs communautaires du Québec.
