= La Romaine, Quebec (unconstituted locality) =

La Romaine
- Unconstituted locality
- Location within Quebec
- Coordinates: 50°12′49″N 60°40′37″W
- Country: Canada
- Province: Quebec
- Region: Côte-Nord
- RCM: Le Golfe-du-Saint-Laurent
- Municipality: Côte-Nord-du-Golfe-du-Saint-Laurent

Government
  - Federal riding: Manicouagan
  - Prov. riding: Duplessis

Area
  - Land: 1.63 km^{2} (0.63 sq mi)

Population (2011)
  - Total: 96
  - Density: 58.9/km^{2} (153/sq mi)
  - Change (2006–11): ▼23.8%
  - Dwellings: 54
- Time zone: UTC-4 (AST)

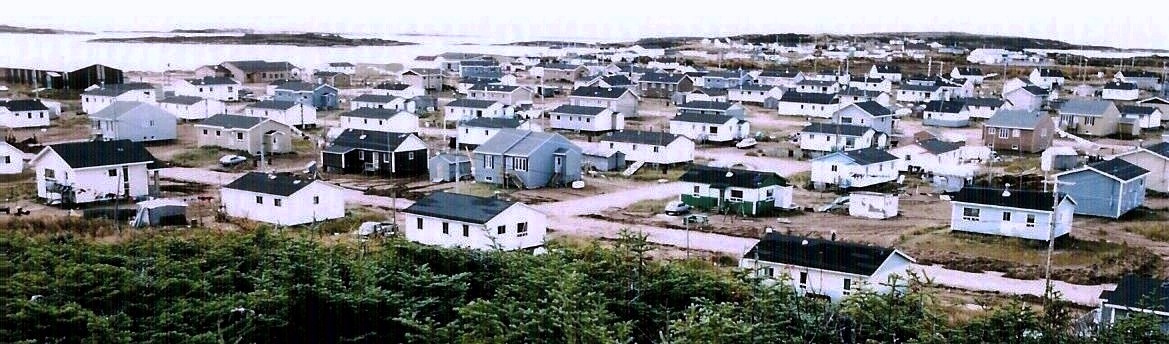
Image of the community

La Romaine (French pronunciation: [la ʁɔmɛn]) is an unconstituted locality (as defined by Statistics Canada in the Canada 2011 Census) within the municipality of Côte-Nord-du-Golfe-du-Saint-Laurent in the Côte-Nord region of Quebec, Canada.

== Geography ==
It is directly adjacent to the much larger (in population) Native reservation of the same name.

== Demographics ==
In the 2021 Census of Population conducted by Statistics Canada, La Romaine had a population of 63 living in 38 of its 48 total private dwellings, a change of 1160% from its 2016 population of 5. With a land area of 1.02 km^{2} (0.39 sq mi), it had a population density of 61.8/km^{2} (160.0/sq mi) in 2021.

== Government ==
In 2017, Mrs Danielle Collard acts as the municipal secretary.

== Education ==
Commission scolaire du Littoral operates the Marie-Sarah School for adults. Its school program for children was suspended in 2014. It was formerly a francophone school.
