= CKIA-FM =

Community radio station in Quebec City

Coordinates: 46°48′27″N 71°13′00″W

- Quebec City, Quebec; Canada
- Frequency: 88.3 MHz
- Branding: Radio Urbaine

Programming
- Format: community radio

Ownership
- Owner: Radio Basse-Ville

History
- First air date: October 31, 1984

Technical information
- Class: A
- ERP: 350 watts
- HAAT: 163.6 meters (537 ft)

Links
- Website: https://ckiafm.org/

CKIA-FM is a French-language Canadian radio station located in Quebec City, Quebec.

The station operates under a community radio licence and is owned by a non-profit group known as Radio Basse-Ville. It broadcasts on 88.3 MHz with an effective radiated power of 350 watts (class A) using an omnidirectional antenna, broadcasting from 191 Rue Saint-Paul in Vieux-Québec.

In 2016, the station premiered TransRéalité, the first radio program in Quebec devoted to transgender issues.

The station is a member of the Association des radiodiffuseurs communautaires du Québec.

== History ==
It is in the autumn of 1978 that the Groupe d'animation par les médias d'intervention communautaire (GAMIC) was formed. This group wants to offer community and grassroots Quebec-based groups effective information and communication support, because, in written and digital media, the preoccupations and objectives of the different concerned groups are poorly conveyed. However, one of the methods to remedy this situation is to create your own means of communication and control its ownership.

With this perspective in mind, in the autumn of 1979, GAMIC undertook an opinion poll of grassroots groups to assess their communication needs and problems. The survey revealed that there was a pressing need, and the results seemed to indicate that setting up a community radio station would be a way of restoring the balance in favour of those who did not have access to traditional media. Thus, after several meetings with multiple grassroots groups of Basse-Ville, the Radio Basse-Ville implementation committee was formed in February 1980. This first committee brought together various different representatives who undertook the job of setting up the radio station in Basse-Ville. It was at this time that the first contacts with the Quebec Ministry of Communications, which offers a program of financial support for community media (formerly PAMEC, now PARC), and also with the Association des radiodiffuseurs communautaires du Québec (ARCQ), which offers technical assistance to not yet implemented media.

The Quebec Ministry of Communications refuses to provide financial support for Radio Basse-Ville, claiming that its policy of only supporting one community media outlet per territory or administrative region prevents it from financing Radio Basse-Ville.

After finishing its implementation in the summer of 1980, Radio Basse-Ville undertook technical and socioeconomic studies to help raise awareness of the idea of a community radio station in Basse-Ville. In addition, in the same summer, Radio Basse-Ville entered negotiations with another community radio station in Quebec, CKRL-FM, to explore possible forms of mutual support and assistance.

In the autumn of 1981, Radio Basse-Ville undertook its first grand membership campaign, which allowed it to grow to over a hundred active members. On October 14, 1981, the official founding meeting of Radio Basse-Ville took place. In this meeting, the principle was adopted of opening negotiations with CKRL-FM to obtain a slot in their programming schedule in order to help with the technical and radio training of volunteers, and to support the establishment of the radio station. In addition, the radio broadened its support in the community through the support it received from the Cégep Limoilou, the CLSC Basse-Ville and the Caisse populaire de Québec-est.

In the spring of 1982, Radio Basse-Ville signed a memorandum of understanding with CKRL-FM, allowing it to broadcast 5 hours of programming per week, every Wednesday afternoon, live with the studios of the Cégep Limoilou. Elsewhere, a second campaign of financing and membership was launched in the autumn of 1982, ending with there being over 500 active members. At the general assembly in the autumn of 1982, the members decided to pursue the radio collaboration project with CKRL-FM, but more importantly, they decided to take the necessary steps to obtain an independent broadcasting licence from the Canadian Radio-television and Telecommunications Commission (CRTC). To obtain the permit, Radio Basse-Ville had to present a technical study to the Minister of Communications of Canada, a promise to describe its programming to the CRTC, and finally, a financing study to assess the financial health of the community radio station.

At the same time that these official steps were being taken, links with community groups were being refined. The recruitment of volunteers, both for the production of radio programmes and for the organisation of the structures and running of the future station intensified. A special campaign of financing and promotion begins. The purchase of equipment and the development of premises and facilities begins. The project proceeds, the audience of the CRTC held hearings and Radio Basse-Ville was finally granted a broadcasting licence.

On October 31, 1984, after two years of intense and sustained effort and six years of popular will, Radio Basse-Ville went on the air at 96.1 MHz at 6.8 watts. However, the station had to move to a new frequency to increase its power; the move and the power increase took place in September 2001, and the station then began stereophonic transmissions. The 96.1 MHz frequency is now used by CBM-FM-2, a CBC Radio 2 station which is actually a rebroadcaster of Montreal station CBM-FM.
