= CFIN-FM (Coaticook, Quebec) =

Former radio station in Coaticook, Quebec, Canada

CFIN-FM is a defunct radio station in Coaticook, Quebec, Canada.

In 1982, Coaticook FM Inc.'s application for a new FM station was denied. The station reapplied the same year to broadcast at 104.5 MHz (FM) with power of 710 watts and received CRTC approval in November 1982. The CFIN callsign was assigned in February 1983 and signed on in October later that same year.

CFIN received approval to decrease power from 710 to 450 watts in 1984.

In 1986, the station received a short-term one year licence renewal. The commission denied the renewal application a year later.

On July 4, 1987, CFIN-FM broadcasting at 104.5 MHz with 450 watts left the air for good, due to financial and non-compliance difficulties. Radio CFIN Inc. applied to reopen the station but denied the application in 1988.

The CFIN callsign now belongs to a radio station in Lac-Etchemin, Quebec. The 104.5 MHz frequency would be reallocated to nearby Sherbrooke, in which it would later be used by CJTS-FM; that station would cease operations on December 6, 2011.
