= Centre de services scolaire du Littoral =

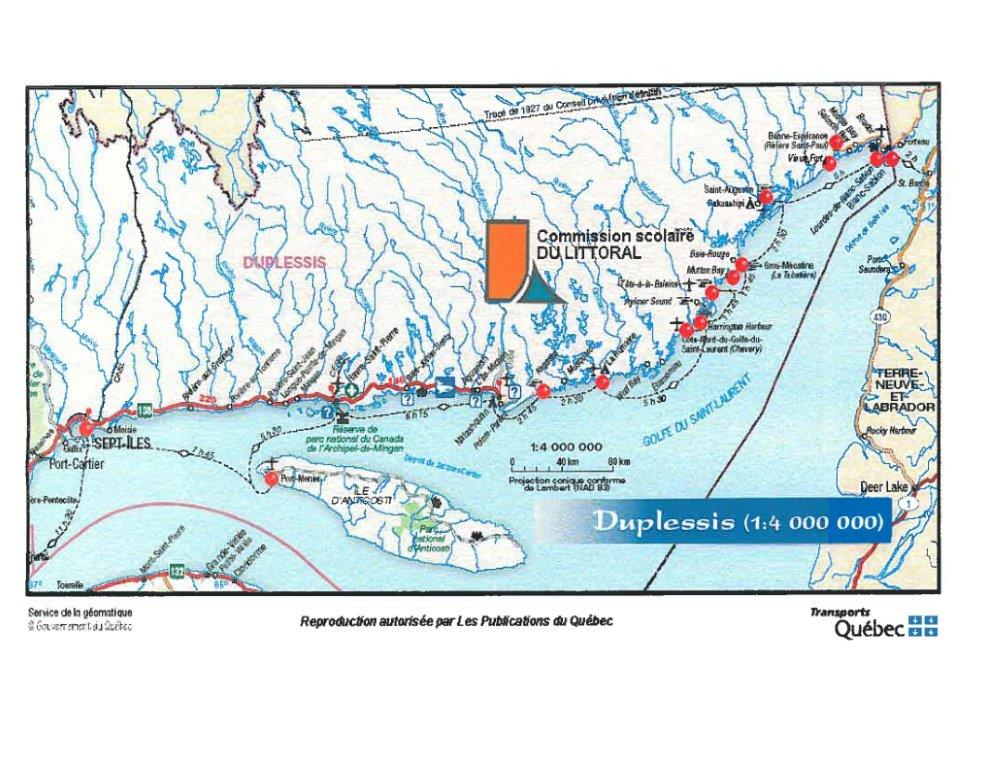

The Centre de services scolaire du Littoral is a geographically-based school service centre in Quebec, Canada, with offices in Sept-Îles and Chevery.

Situated along the Gulf of St. Lawrence, the School Board territory consists of nine Anglophone villages and four Francophone villages, scattered along 460 kilometres (285 miles) of coastline from Kegaska to Blanc-Sablon including Port-Menier (Anticosti Island). Their respective populations vary between 100 and 1000 inhabitants.

The School Board has an annual enrolment of approximately 570 students. It offers general education services to the youth sector for pre-school, primary, and secondary levels as well as literacy and secondary general education sector to the Adult Education sector.

== Schools ==
Preschool-Secondary 5:

- Gabriel-Dionne School (Tête-à-la-Baleine) - French school - Also has adult education
- Mecatina School (La Tabatière) - English school - Also has adult education
- Mgr-Scheffer School (Lourdes-de-Blanc-Sablon) - French school or all levels, English school for preschool and elementary
- Netagamiou School (Chevery) - English school for all levels, French school for preschool and elementary - Also has adult education
- St-Augustine School (St-Augustine River) - English school for all levels, French school for preschool and elementary - Also has adult education

Secondary 1-5:

- St-Paul School (St-Paul River) - English school - Also has adult education

Preschool-Secondary 3:

- Harrington School (Harrington Harbour) - English school - Also has adult education

Preschool-Secondary 2:

- Kegaska School (Kegaska) - English school
- St-Lawrence School (Mutton Bay) - English school - Also has adult education
- St-Joseph School (Port Menier) - French school

Preschool and elementary:

- Mountain Ridge School (Vieux Fort) - English school - Also has adult education

Adult education only:

- St-Theresa School (Blanc Sablon)
- Marie-Sarah School (La Romaine)
  - Its school program for children was suspended in 2014 It was formerly a francophone school.

== Territory ==
- The Municipality of the Lower North-Shore of the Gulf of St. Lawrence (includes Kegaska, La Romaine, Chevery, Harrington Harbour and Tête-à-la-Baleine).
- The Municipality of Blanc-Sablon (includes Blanc-Sablon, Lourdes-de-Blanc-Sablon and Brador Bay).
- The Municipality of Bonne Esperance (Middle Bay, St. Paul's River and Old Fort Bay).
- The Municipality of Anticosti Island (Port Menier).
- The Municipality of Gros Mecatina (La Tabatière, Mutton Bay).
- The Municipality of St. Augustine River (St. Augustine River).

== History ==
On April 14, 1967, the National Assembly of the Province of Québec sanctioned Bill 41, instituting the "Commission scolaire de la Côte-Nord du Golfe St-Laurent". This school board, directed by an administrator, would become responsible for education in fifteen communities. These communities spread out from Kegaska to Blanc Sablon, a territory of 460 kilometres (285 miles) that is not connected to the Québec Provincial road network. Bill 41, created the first "unified" school board in the Province of Québec, serving a French, English, and Native population of Catholic and Protestant religion and giving courses from Kindergarten to Secondary inclusively.

On June 18, 1975, the name of the Commission scolaire de la Côte-Nord du Golfe St-Laurent was changed to the Littoral School Board (Commission scolaire du Littoral in French). Prior to the creation of the district, multiple school districts from various religious orders controlled the area, and none of them offered senior high school education.

The territory of Anticosti Island was added to the Littoral School Board with Bill 48 which was passed on June 18, 1976.
Following inter-governmental agreements, the Natives acquired their school autonomy on the St. Augustine River Reservation on July 1, 1990, and on the La Romaine Reserve on July 1, 1991. However, the school board maintained services in these two communities to serve the non-Indian population.

The School Board holds a special status considering it is managed by an administrator (who is named by the Lieutenant Governor in Council) who replaces the school commissioners and the director-general. He exercises his powers by means of ordinances, of which a copy is automatically transmitted to the Minister who decides to accept it or to reject it in whole or in part.

Moreover, the Littoral School Board is characterized by the fact that it is not classified as a linguistic school board.

== School board logo ==
Orange represents the soil and its residents. Turquoise (blue-green) represents the sea that is omnipresent on the territory. The vertical features imitate the territory and its size. The triangle represents Anticosti Island and the motion of the waves, referring to the district's motto: "We extend the horizons of knowledge, against all winds and tides..." The whole forms an "L" for Littoral.
