= Beaucanton, Quebec =

Beaucanton
- Unconstituted locality
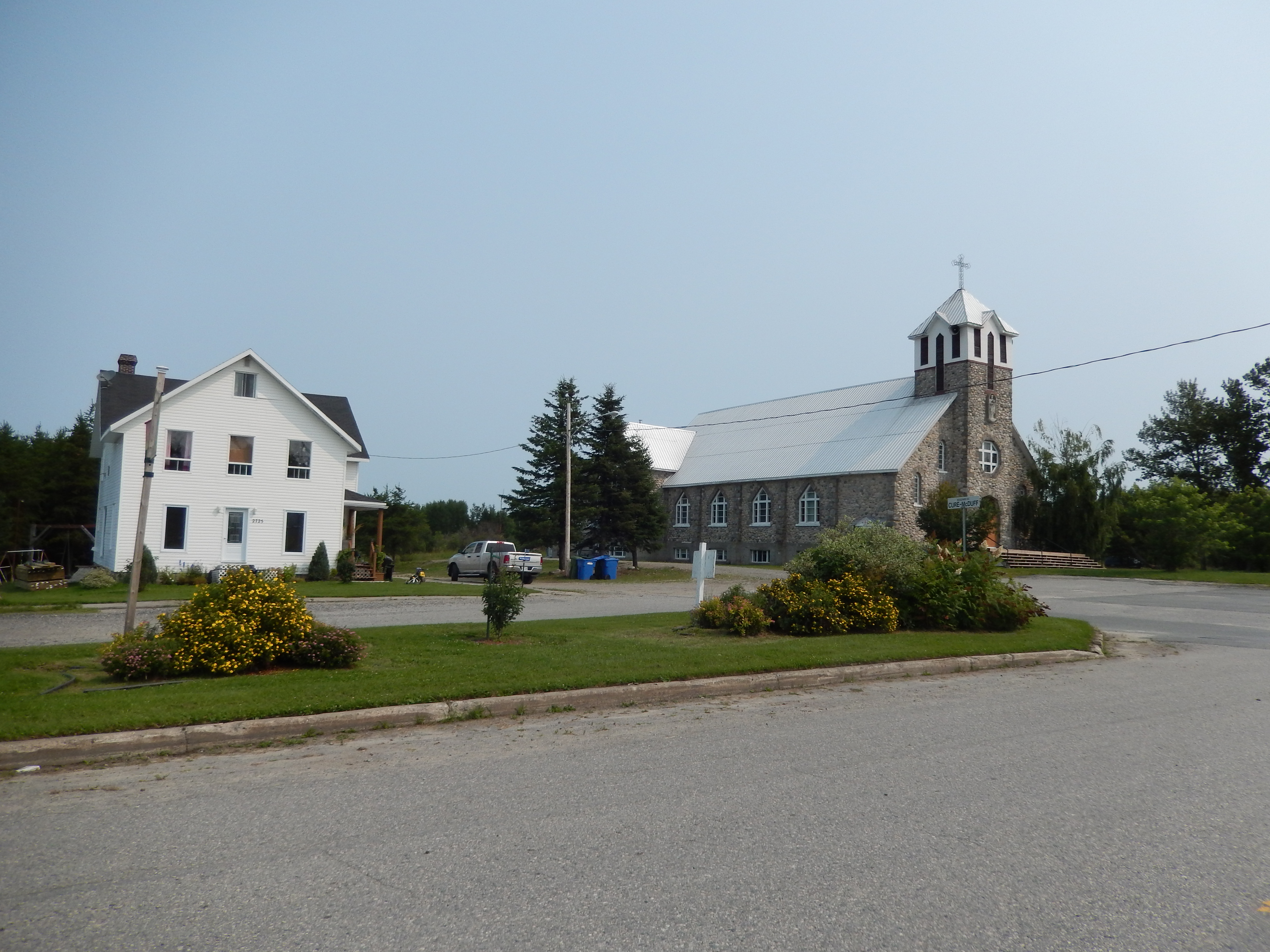
- Village of Beaucanton

- Location within Quebec
- Coordinates: 49°02′18″N 79°14′20″W
- Country: Canada
- Province: Quebec
- Region: Nord-du-Québec
- TE: Jamésie
- Municipality: Eeyou Istchee Baie-James

Government
  - Federal riding: Abitibi—Témiscamingue
  - Prov. riding: Ungava

Area
  - Land: 10.92 km^{2} (4.22 sq mi)

Population (2011)
  - Total: 116
  - Density: 10.6/km^{2} (27/sq mi)
  - Change (2006–11): ▼24.2%
  - Dwellings: 53
- Time zone: UTC−5 (EST)
  - Summer (DST): UTC−4 (EDT)

Beaucanton is an unconstituted locality within the municipality of Eeyou Istchee Baie-James in the Nord-du-Québec region of Quebec, Canada.

== Demographics ==
In the 2021 Census of Population conducted by Statistics Canada, Beaucanton had a population of 153 living in 73 of its 79 total private dwellings, a change of 0.7% from its 2016 population of 152. With a land area of 28.21 km^{2} (10.89 sq mi), it had a population density of 5.4/km^{2} (14.0/sq mi) in 2021.
