= CJBE-FM =

Coordinates: 49°48′59″N 64°20′57″W

- Port-Menier, Quebec; Canada
- Frequency: 90.5 MHz
- Branding: CJBE Radio Anticosti

Programming
- Language: French
- Format: Community radio

Ownership
- Owner: Radio Anticosti Inc.

History
- First air date: 1988
- Former frequencies: 90.1 MHz

Technical information
- ERP: 0.088 kW average 0.496 kW peak
- HAAT: 9.5 metres (31 ft)

Links
- Website: radioanticosti.com

CJBE-FM is a french language community radio station that operates at 90.5 FM in Port-Menier, Quebec, Canada.

Owned by Radio Anticosti, the station received CRTC approval in 1988 to operate at 90.1 MHz, until it moved to its current frequency in 2006.

The station is a member of the Association des radiodiffuseurs communautaires du Québec.
