= CFIN-FM =

Radio station in Lac-Etchemin, Quebec, Canada

Coordinates: 46°24′41″N 70°35′42″W

- Lac-Etchemin, Quebec, Canada; Canada
- Frequency: 100.5 MHz
- Branding: Passion FM

Ownership
- Owner: Radio Bellechasse

History
- First air date: 1992/03/27

Technical information
- Class: B
- ERP: 9.6 kWs
- HAAT: 206 meters (676 ft)

CFIN-FM is a French-language Canadian radio station located in Lac-Etchemin, Quebec.

It broadcasts on 100.5 MHz with an effective radiated power of 9,600 watts (class B) using an omnidirectional antenna.

The station has a variety format and operates under a community radio licence. CFIN-FM received approval in 1991 and went on the air on march 27th,1992. One of their most famous shows was the weekly "Son Noir des Nuits Blanches", mainly a classic-rock show broadcast on Saturday nights from midnight to 2 A.M. from 1993 to 1998.

CFIN-FM operates four rebroadcasters. The most powerful one, CFIN-FM-1, is located in Armagh, and broadcasts on 103.9 MHz with an effective radiated power of 1,390 watts (class A) using an omnidirectional antenna. The other ones all broadcast on 105.5 MHz using a directional antenna with a peak effective radiated power of 50 watts (class LP); these rebroadcasters are:

- CFIN-FM-2 in Saint-Malachie,
- CFIN-FM-3 in Saint-Anselme and
- CFIN-FM-4 in Saint-Jean-d'Orléans. Their average effective radiated power is respectively 34, 32 and 35 watts.

The call sign CFIN-FM was previously used by an unrelated defunct private station in Coaticook which operated from 1984 to 1987. That station had to close after the Canadian Radio-television and Telecommunications Commission refused to renew its licence.

The station is a member of the Association des radiodiffuseurs communautaires du Québec.
