= CJTB-FM =

Coordinates: 50°42′12″N 59°19′26″W

- Tête-à-la-Baleine, Quebec; Canada
- Frequency: 93.1 MHz

Programming
- Language: French
- Format: Community radio

Ownership
- Owner: Radio communautaire Tête-à-la-Baleine

History
- Founded: 1998
- First air date: December 5, 2003

Technical information
- Licensing authority: CRTC
- ERP: 40 watts
- HAAT: 25 metres (82 ft)

Links
- Website: cjtbradio.ca

CJTB-FM is a French language community radio station that operates at 93.1 FM in Tête-à-la-Baleine, Quebec, Canada.

Owned by Radio communautaire Tête-à-la-Baleine, the station received CRTC approval in 2003.

The station is a member of the Association des radiodiffuseurs communautaires du Québec.
