= CHAA-FM =

Radio station in Longueuil, Quebec

Coordinates: 45°33′34″N 73°33′07″W

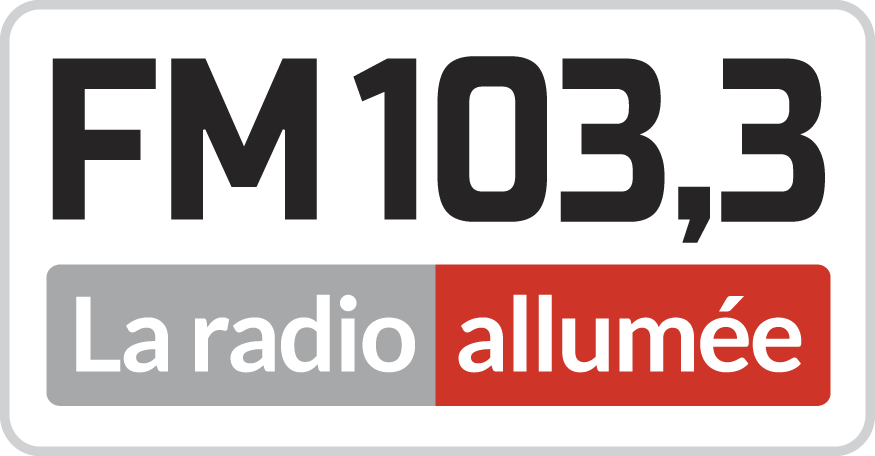
- Longueuil, Quebec; Canada
- Broadcast area: Montreal
- Frequency: 103.3 MHz
- Branding: FM 103,3

Programming
- Language: French
- Format: Community radio
- Subchannels: HD2: Country Coyote New Country

Ownership
- Owner: Radio Communautaire de la Rive-Sud Inc.

Technical information
- Class: A
- ERP: 340 watts
- HAAT: 192.5 metres (632 ft)

Links
- Website: fm1033.ca

CHAA-FM is a French-language Canadian radio station located in Longueuil, Quebec, near Montreal.

It broadcasts on 103.3 MHz using a directional antenna located on the tower of the Olympic Stadium with an average effective radiated power of 64 watts and a peak effective radiated power of 263 watts (class A).

The station operates under a community radio licence and identifies itself as "FM 103,3".

Despite being near Montreal and having its transmitter, but not its studios, in the city, the station is focused on Longueuil and as such does not attempt to serve Montreal listeners, even though CHAA-FM does have some listeners there as the station's signal is adequate in many parts of the city.

Originally broadcasting on 103.1 MHz when it went on the air on November 15, 1987, the station was forced to move to 103.3 MHz in 1996 after CKOD-FM in Salaberry-de-Valleyfield, about 60 kilometres (37 mi) west, moved to 103.1 MHz during the preceding year.

The station is a member of the Association des radiodiffuseurs communautaires du Québec.

== Logos ==
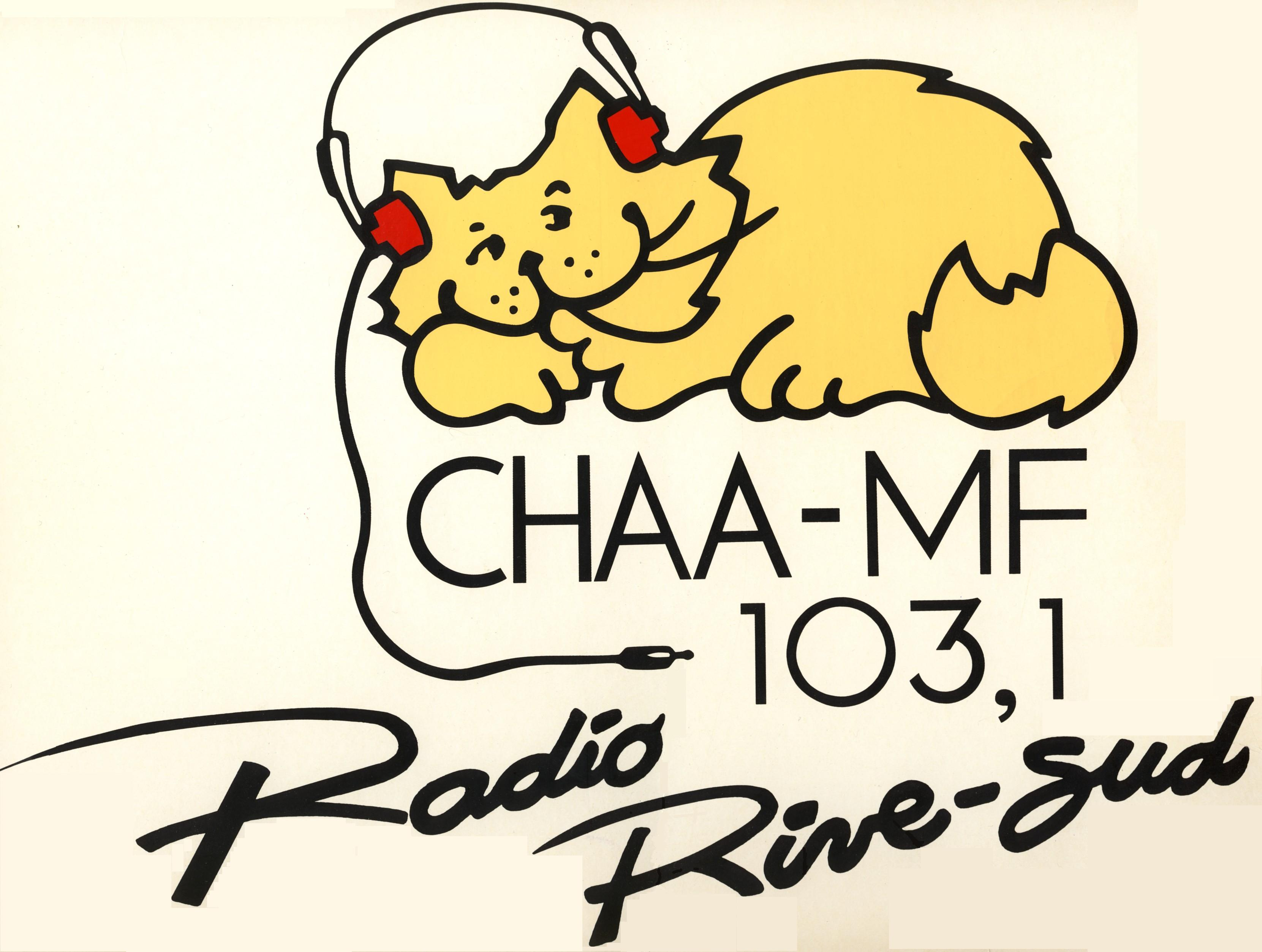
First logo in 1987

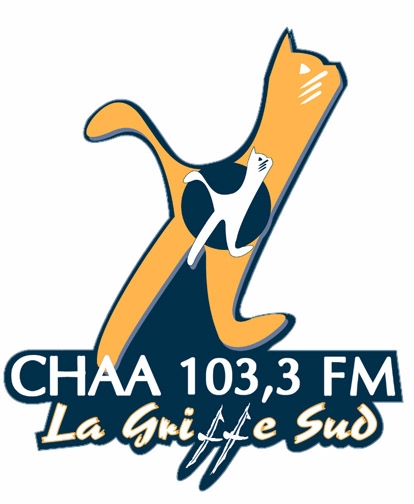
Logo update in 2000

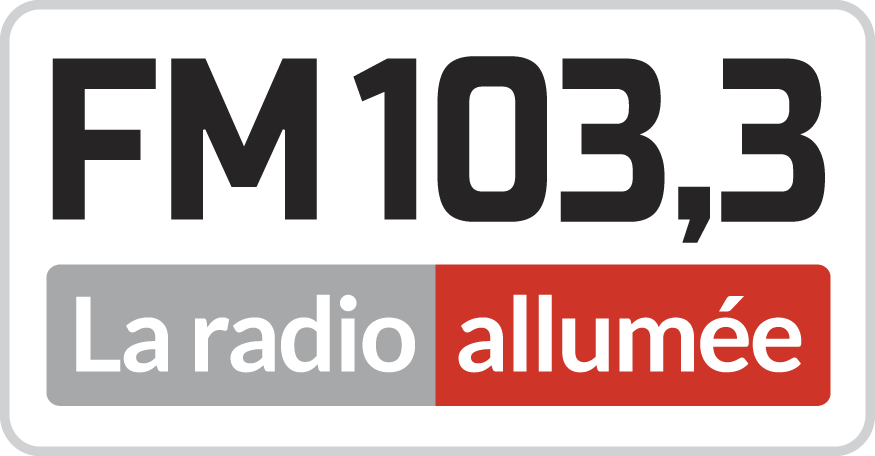
Logo update in 2021

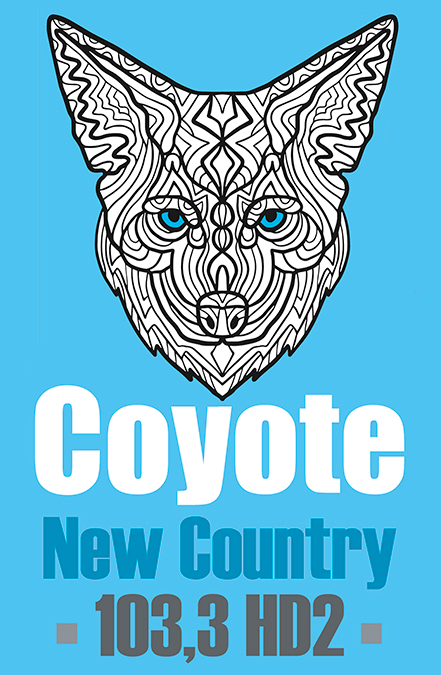
Alternative country logo from 2021
