= CKNA-FM =

Community radio station in Natashquan, Quebec

Coordinates: 50°10′55″N 61°48′57″W

- Natashquan, Quebec; Canada
- Frequency: 104.1 MHz

Programming
- Format: Community radio

Ownership
- Owner: La Radio communautaire CKNA

History
- First air date: January 30, 1983
- Former frequencies: 98.1 MHz (1983–1986)

Technical information
- Class: B
- ERP: 4.2 kW average 6.56 kW peak
- HAAT: 58.7 metres (193 ft)

Links
- Website: www.ckna.ca

CKNA-FM is a French language community radio station that operates at 104.1 FM in Natashquan, Quebec, Canada.

Owned by La Radio communautaire CKNA, the station's original approval was to operate a new radio station at 98.1 FM in 1984, until it received approval to move to its current frequency at 104.1 FM in 1986. The station had signed on previous to being licensed, going under the call sign CJAN (in reality assigned to a station in Asbestos, Quebec), over the 1982 Christmas holiday and permanently on January 30, 1983.

The station is a member of the Association des radiodiffuseurs communautaires du Québec.
