= CFRD-FM =

Radio station in British Columbia, Canada

Coordinates: 53.1028°N 121.5678°W

CFRD-FM is an English language community radio station which operates on the frequency of 92.5 MHz (FM) in Wells, British Columbia, Canada. The Wells Community Radio Association received approval for the new station by the Canadian Radio-television and Telecommunications Commission (CRTC) on August 9, 2013.
