= CKMN-FM =

Radio station in Rimouski, Quebec, Canada

Coordinates: 48°27′48″N 68°12′29″W

- Rimouski, Quebec; Canada
- Frequency: 96.5 MHz

Programming
- Format: Community radio

Ownership
- Owner: La radio communautaire du comté Rimouski et Mont-Joli

History
- First air date: 1989

Technical information
- Licensing authority: CRTC
- Class: B
- ERP: 6,400 watts
- HAAT: 396 metres (1,299 ft)

Links
- Website: ckmn.fm

CKMN-FM is a community radio station that operates at 96.5 FM in Rimouski, Quebec, Canada.

Owned by La radio communautaire du comté Rimouski et Mont-Joli, the station received CRTC licensing in 1989.

The station is a member of the Association des radiodiffuseurs communautaires du Québec.
