= CIYU-FM =

Radio station in Fort McKay, Alberta

Coordinates: 57.184°N 111.636°W

CYIU-FM is a low-power Type B Native radio station which provides First Nations community radio programming on the frequency of 106.3 FM/MHz in Fort McKay, Alberta, Canada, serving listeners within the Fort McKay First Nation.

The station, owned by the Fort McKay Radio Society, received approval to broadcast from the CRTC on March 17, 2015. The station will broadcast with an effective radiated power of 50 watts (non-directional antenna with an effective height of antenna above average terrain of 6.6 metres).

In the application, the station said that it would broadcast at least 26 hours a week in Cree and Dene, with the remainder of its programming in English.
