= CFLX-FM =

Radio station in Sherbrooke, Quebec

Coordinates: 45.40250°N 71.89119°W

- Sherbrooke, Quebec; Canada
- Frequency: 95.5 MHz
- Branding: CFLX 95.5

Programming
- Format: community radio

Ownership
- Owner: Radio Communautaire de l'Estrie

History
- First air date: October 8, 1984
- Call sign meaning: Félix Leclerc

Technical information
- Class: A
- ERP: 1.33 kW
- HAAT: 135 metres (443 ft)

Links
- Website: cflx.qc.ca

CFLX-FM is a Canadian radio station, broadcasting at 95.5 FM in Sherbrooke, Quebec. The station airs a francophone community radio format for Sherbrooke and the Estrie region. More than 50% of its weekly programming is produced live.

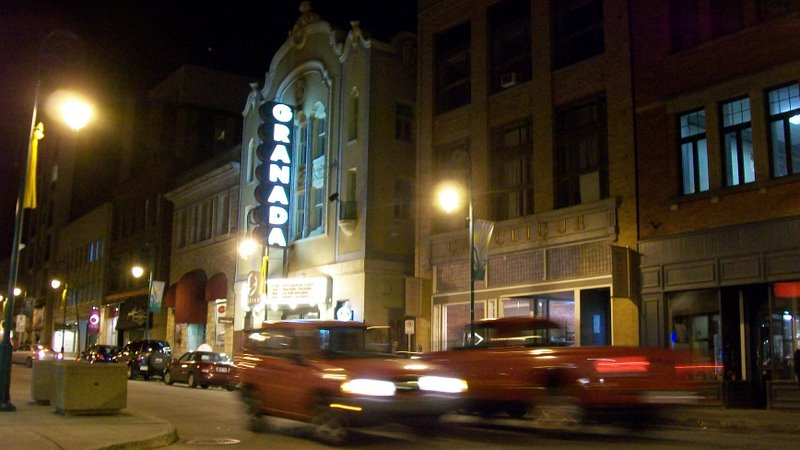
The studios are located near the Granada Theatre.

The callsign CFLX is made after the name of the very famous Quebec poet Félix Leclerc.

The station is a member of the Association des radiodiffuseurs communautaires du Québec.

== History ==
The station originally goes back to as early as 1975 when Radio Communautaire de l’Estrie was formed and was only available on 98.1 cable FM. On June 17, 1980, Radio Communautaire de l’Estrie Inc. received approval from the Canadian Radio-television and Telecommunications Commission to operate a new French-language community FM radio station at 99.7 MHz. The station didn't sign on the air until October 8, 1984 after Radio Communautaire de l’Estrie received CRTC approval to change CFLX-FM's frequency from 99.7 MHz to 95.5 MHz on August 18, 1983.
