= CHCN-FM =

Former community radio station in Cole Harbour, Nova Scotia

- Cole Harbour, Nova Scotia; Canada
- Frequency: 106.9 MHz
- Branding: Cole Harbour Community Network

Programming
- Format: Community Radio

Ownership
- Owner: Cole Harbour Community Radio Society

History
- First air date: 2000
- Last air date: May 2, 2003
- Call sign meaning: Cole Harbour Community Network

Technical information
- Class: LP
- ERP: 20 watts

CHCN-FM was a community radio station that broadcast at 106.9 FM in Cole Harbour, Nova Scotia, Canada.

The station was planned to be run by the local Cole Harbour District High School, and its call letters meant "Cole Harbour Community Network."

Owned by the Cole Harbour Community Radio Society, the station was originally granted a licence by the Canadian Radio-television and Telecommunications Commission in 2000, but faced some initial delays getting on the air. The station was granted licence amendments in 2001 to change its transmitter location and lower its power and to extend the time limit on its planned launch date.

The licence was subsequently revoked in 2003 at the station's request. The licence was reinstated in 2010.

The station was later branded Sackville Country Radio.

== Closure ==
CHCN-FM has not broadcast on 106.9 since 2012. The fate of the station is not known. As of October 20, 2024, the frequency remains open, but the call letters have been taken by a station in Montreal Lake, Saskatchewan.
