= CIDO-FM =

Radio station in Creston, British Columbia

Coordinates: 49°05′25″N 116°22′49″W

- Creston, British Columbia; Canada
- Frequency: 97.7 MHz
- Branding: Creston Community Radio

Programming
- Format: community radio

Ownership
- Owner: Creston Community Radio Society

Technical information
- Class: LP
- ERP: 20 watts
- HAAT: 332.7 meters (1,092 ft)

Links
- Website: Creston Radio Canada

CIDO-FM, branded as Creston Community Radio, was a community radio station broadcasting with an effective radiated power of 20 watts in the Southern Interior town of Creston, British Columbia, Canada. The non-commercial station, airing on 97.7 FM, was staffed entirely by members and volunteers of the Creston Community Radio Society.

== History ==
The Society was founded in 2001 to provide locally based broadcasting in the Creston Area, after the Creston Valley's only commercial radio station discontinued its local broadcasting. The station branded itself as "977 CIDO, Creston Valley's Community Radio Station" and promoted itself as "A different view on a familiar valley." Also on the FM dial is CBTS-FM at 100.3 MHz (rebroadcasting CBTK-FM Kelowna, BC as part of the CBC Radio One network.

CIDO-FM's broadcast application to the Canadian Radio-television and Telecommunications Commission was approved in February 2005, allowing the society to broadcast as an English-language FM type B community radio station.

The station was one of several new community radio stations launched in the Kootenay region in the 2000s. Others include CJLY-FM in Nelson, CFAD-FM in Salmo, CJHQ-FM in Nakusp and CHLI-FM in Rossland.

The Creston radio scene changed again on August 7, 2015 when commercial radio station CKCV-FM took to the air. CIDO-FM’s licence was due to expire August 31, 2016 but the CRTC received word on August 3, 2016 that the station had closed and would not be seeking to have the licence renewed.
