= CFAD-FM =

Former radio station in Salmo, British Columbia

Coordinates: 49°11′10″N 117°16′59″W

Defunct
- Salmo, British Columbia; Canada
- Frequency: 91.1 MHz
- Branding: 91.1 The Hummingbird

Programming
- Format: community radio

Ownership
- Owner: Salmo FM Radio Society

History
- First air date: October 11, 2008
- Last air date: January 3, 2017
- Former frequencies: 92.1 MHz (2008–2012)

Technical information
- Class: LP
- ERP: 60 watts
- HAAT: -574 meters

CFAD-FM was a community radio station in Salmo, British Columbia.

Owned by Salmo FM Radio Society, the station was licensed on July 31, 2008. It began broadcasting on October 11, 2008, at 92.1 MHz.

The station was one of several new community radio stations launched in the Kootenay region in the 2000s. Others include CJLY-FM in Nelson, CHLI-FM in Rossland, CJHQ-FM in Nakusp and CIDO-FM in Creston. CFAD was a member of the National Campus and Community Radio Association.

On May 2, 2012, Salmo FM Radio Society received approval from the Canadian Radio-television and Telecommunications Commission (CRTC) to operate an English language FM community radio station to serve Salmo on the frequency of 91.1 MHz.

After 7 years broadcasting as a licensed community radio station, on January 3, 2017, the Salmo FM Radio Society turned off its transmitter and ceased broadcasting.
