= CJQC-FM =

Radio station in Liverpool, Nova Scotia

Coordinates: 44°03′59″N 64°42′57″W

- Liverpool, Nova Scotia; Canada
- Frequency: 99.3 MHz
- Branding: Queens County Community Radio (QCCR)

Programming
- Format: Community radio

Ownership
- Owner: CJQC Radio Society

History
- First air date: June 19, 2008
- Call sign meaning: Queens County

Technical information
- Class: LP
- ERP: 50 watts
- HAAT: -4.2 meters

Links
- Website: qccrfm.com

CJQC-FM, branded as Queens County Community Radio or (QCCR) is a Canadian radio station that broadcasts at 99.3 FM in Liverpool, Nova Scotia.

The studios are located atop of the post office building at 176 Main Street in downtown Liverpool.

== History ==
The station was officially launched on June 19, 2008 under a temporary special events licence. Its business plan was to operate throughout the summer of 2008 in order to gauge community support for the station and complete its formal application for a permanent licence.

On September 15, 2009, the station received CRTC approval for a full-time licence to operate at 99.3 MHz. The general manager at that time was the Canadian broadcaster Alex J. Walling.

In March 2011, Walling suffered a stroke, which led to the deterioration of the station's operations and the verge of bankruptcy. In June 2012, Walling sold the assets of the station to the CJQC Radio Society, a non-profit community organization. In November 2012, the CJQC Radio Society applied for a new licence, for a station which operates at the same frequency of 99.3 MHz at the same parameters as the old licence. The CRTC approved CJQC Radio's application to operate a low-power, English-language community FM radio station in Liverpool on July 29, 2014.
