= CJHQ-FM =

Coordinates: 50°14′25″N 117°48′28″W

- Nakusp, British Columbia; Canada
- Frequency: 107.1 MHz
- Branding: Nakusp Community Radio; The Arrow 107

Programming
- Format: community radio

Ownership
- Owner: Columbia Basin Alliance for Literacy

History
- First air date: September 5, 2005
- Last air date: 2024

Technical information
- Licensing authority: CRTC
- Class: LP
- ERP: 2 watts
- HAAT: −73.9 metres (−242 ft)

Links
- Website: thearrow107.com

CJHQ-FM was a community radio station in Nakusp, British Columbia, broadcasting on 107.1 FM.

Owned by the Columbia Basin Alliance for Literacy, the station was licensed on April 15, 2005, and began broadcasting on September 5 of that year.

The station was one of several new community radio stations launched in the Kootenay region in the 2000s. Others include CJLY-FM in Nelson, CHLI-FM in Rossland, CFAD-FM in Salmo and CIDO-FM in Creston.

After going off the air at the end of 2024, the station's licence was revoked by the CRTC on March 16, 2026.
