= CJUJ-FM =

Radio station in Bathurst, New Brunswick

- Bathurst, New Brunswick; Canada
- Frequency: 103.3 MHz
- Branding: Phantom FM

Programming
- Language: English
- Format: Community radio

Ownership
- Owner: Bathurst Radio Inc.

Technical information
- ERP: 50 watts
- HAAT: 32 metres

Links
- Website: phantom.fm

CJUJ-FM, branded as Phantom FM, is a new low-powered radio station which broadcasts an English-language community radio format on the frequency of 103.3 MHz/FM in Bathurst, New Brunswick, Canada. The new station received approval from the CRTC on October 21, 2013. The station broadcasts with an average effective radiated power of 50 watts (non-directional antenna with an effective HAAT of 32 metres).

Phantom FM has become Bathursts popular radio station since 2014.

Phantom FM runs on air 24 hours per day. It can be found at 103.3 FM in the Bathurst region and also online streaming on the website.

The radio station is primarily driven by a volunteer base. Many show producers from the region produce weekly shows including members of the Pabineau First Nations.

CJUJ 103.3 Bathurst Phantom FM was created by Glen Ferguson. Glen is known for his hosting and production of past television series The Fishing Musicians and The New Brunswick Adventures.

Before social media and YouTube, these productions aired internationally in various countries around the world. Including a National contract (New Brunswick Adventures) with CTV Canada through which aired on Discovery HD Canada Channel, Travel and Escape Channel and CTV main Channel which is Canada's most popular television broadcaster.

The Fishing Musicians aired in several countries and was in contract with multiple international broadcasters.

To date, Phantom FM CJUJ 103.3 Bathurst has had over 50 volunteers donate to the production, maintenance and everyday operations of the community radio station in Bathurst. Bathurst radio Inc. is a non-profit organization consisting of boards member who oversees the governing of CJUJ. Broadcasting Decision CRTC 2021-82 PDF version

Reference: Part 1 licence renewal application posted on 30 October 2020

Ottawa, 22 February 2021

Bathurst Radio Inc. Bathurst, New Brunswick

Public record for this application: 2019-0703-1

CJUJ-FM Bathurst – Licence renewal The Commission renews the broadcasting licence for the low-power, English-language community radio station CJUJ-FM Bathurst, New Brunswick, from 1 March 2021 to 31 August 2026. This short-term renewal will allow for an earlier review of the licensee’s compliance with its regulatory requirements.
