= CFUZ-FM =

Community radio station in British Columbia, Canada

- Penticton, British Columbia; Canada
- Broadcast area: Penticton and surrounding area
- Frequency: 92.9 MHz (FM)
- Branding: Peach City Radio

Programming
- Format: Community radio

Ownership
- Owner: Peach City Community Radio Society

History
- First air date: February 1, 2019

Technical information
- Licensing authority: CRTC
- Power: 49.9 watts
- Transmitter coordinates: 49.4829°N 119.5944°W

CFUZ-FM is a Canadian radio station which operates community radio programming at 92.9 MHz (FM) in Penticton, British Columbia.

Operated by the Peach City Community Radio Society, the station received approval to broadcast by the CRTC on May 4, 2015. The station began broadcasting at 92.9 MHz (FM) with 49.9 watts on February 1, 2019.
