= CFMF-FM =

Community radio station in Fermont, Quebec

Coordinates: 52°49′12″N 67°05′26″W

- Fermont, Quebec; Canada
- Frequency: 103.1 MHz
- Branding: CFMF 103,1

Programming
- Language: French
- Format: Community radio

Ownership
- Owner: La Radio Communautaire de Fermont Inc.

History
- First air date: September 15, 1979

Technical information
- ERP: 9 watts average 20 watts peak
- HAAT: 99 metres

Links
- Website: cfmf.rocks

CFMF-FM is a French language community radio station that operates at 103.1 FM in Fermont, Quebec, Canada.

== History ==
The station was launched on September 15, 1979 on 103.1 MHz, with an effective radiated power of 20 watts. It was licensed to Radio Communautaire de Fermont Inc.

The station is a member of the Association des radiodiffuseurs communautaires du Québec.
