= Taqramiut Nipingat =

First Nations radio network in northern Quebec

- Type: Community radio
- Country: Canada
- Availability: Nunavik
- Owner: Taqramiut Nipingat Inc.
- Official website: Official website

Taqramiut Nipingat is a Canadian radio network, which broadcasts community radio programming in Inuktitut to 14 communities in the Nunavik region of Quebec. The service, whose name means "Voice of the People", began as an individual community radio program serving the region in the early 1970s before being incorporated as a full standalone radio network in 1975.

The network operates from offices in Montreal and Salluit, with smaller production offices in Kuujjuaq and Puvirnituq.

The company has also produced selected Inuit-language television drama programs, for broadcast on CBC North and APTN.

== Transmitters ==
Rebroadcasters of Taqramiut Nipingat (Single-frequency network)
| City of licence | Identifier | Frequency | Power | Class | RECNet |
|---|---|---|---|---|---|
| Akulivik | VF2445 | 94.1 | 19 watts | LP | Query |
| Aupaluk | VF2434 | 94.1 | 19 watts | LP | Query |
| Inukjuak | VF2441 | 94.1 | 6 watts | LP | Query |
| Ivujivik | VF2447 | 94.1 | 19 watts | LP | Query |
| Kangiqsualujjuaq | VF2443 | 94.1 | 19 watts | LP | Query |
| Kangiqsujuaq | VF2436 | 94.1 | 19 watts | LP | Query |
| Kangirsuk | VF2437 | 94.1 | 19 watts | LP | Query |
| Kuujjuaq | VF2439 | 94.1 | 21 watts | LP | Query |
| Kuujjuarapik | VF2438 | 94.1 | 19 watts | LP | Query |
| Puvirnituq | VF2442 | 94.1 | 19 watts | LP | Query |
| Quaqtaq | VF2435 | 94.1 | 19 watts | LP | Query |
| Salluit | VF2446 | 94.1 | 19 watts | LP | Query |
| Tasiujaq | VF2444 | 94.1 | 23 watts | LP | Query |
| Umiujaq | VF2440 | 94.1 | 25 watts | LP | Query |
