= CJMD-FM =

Radio station in Lévis, Quebec

Coordinates: 46.7921°N 71.1837°W

Lévis, Quebec; Canada
- Broadcast area: greater Quebec City
- Frequency: 96.9 MHz
- Branding: Lévis 96.9

Programming
- Language: French

Ownership
- Owner: Radio communautaire de Lévis

History
- First air date: September 4, 2009 (approval)

Technical information
- Class: A
- ERP: 509 watts average 1000 watts peak
- HAAT: 18.9 metres (62 ft)

Links
- Website: 969fm.ca

CJMD-FM is a Canadian radio station, broadcasting a French-language community radio format on the frequency 96.9 FM in Lévis, Quebec.

Owned by Radio communautaire de Lévis, the station received CRTC approval on September 4, 2009.

The station is a member of the Association des radiodiffuseurs communautaires du Québec.
