= CFUT-FM =

Radio station in Shawinigan, Quebec, Canada

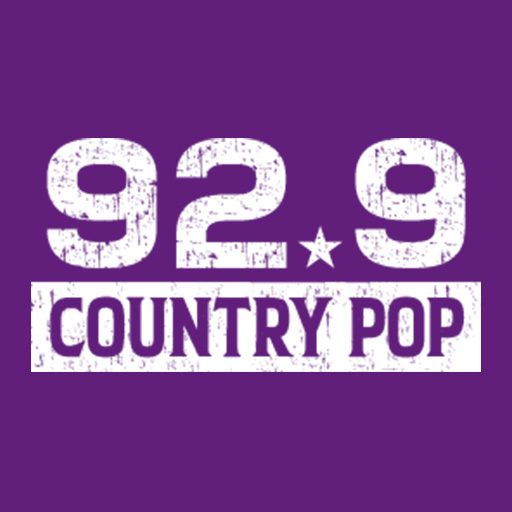
- Shawinigan, Quebec; Canada
- Frequency: 92.9 MHz
- Branding: 92,9 CFUT

Programming
- Language: French
- Format: Community radio

Ownership
- Owner: La Radio Campus Communautaire Francophone de Shawinigan, Inc.
- Sister stations: CHHO-FM

History
- First air date: 2005
- Former frequencies: 91.1 MHz (2005–2016)

Technical information
- Class: A
- ERP: 2.046 kW average 3.8 kW peak
- HAAT: 123.7 metres
- Transmitter coordinates: 46°36′2.88″N 72°43′30″W

Links
- Webcast: Country Pop 92,9 (online stream)
- Website: Country Pop 92.9

CFUT-FM is a Canadian community radio station broadcasting in Shawinigan, Quebec. Launched in 2005, the station broadcasts a French language community radio format at 92.9 FM. The station is owned by La Radio Campus Communautaire Francophone de Shawinigan, Inc.

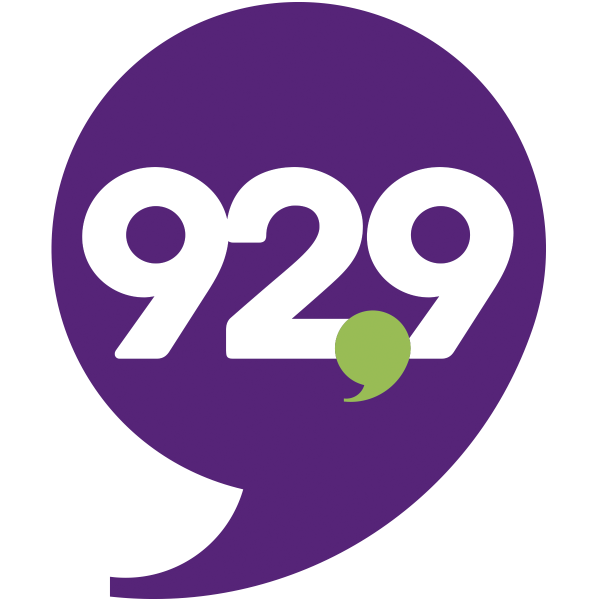
Logo from 2016 to February 1, 2021

On January 6, 2011, the station applied to the Canadian Radio-television and Telecommunications Commission (CRTC) to change frequencies from 91.1 MHz to 88.1 MHz, in order to provide a more quality signal to its listeners. On October 21, 2011, this application was denied by the CRTC, following interventions by CFOU-FM 89.1 MHz in Trois-Rivières, citing potential interference issues; and CHHO-FM 103.1 MHz in Louiseville, citing competition issues. The broadcasting group opted to relocate instead from 91.1 MHz to 92.9 MHz, in addition to increasing its effective radiated power (ERP) from 199 to 3,700 watts (with maximum ERP from 250 to 3,700 watts with an increase of EHAAT from 9.2 to 123.7 metres); and relocating its transmitter site from Shawinigan to Mont-Carmel, but was once again denied by the CRTC on May 9, 2013, citing concerns with CHHO-FM, as well as the station requesting too large of an upgrade. The commission approved a similar 2014 application to relocate the transmitter to Grand-Mère and increase power to 2,100 watts, which took effect in April 2016.

On February 1, 2021, the radio locale de Shawinigan became Country Pop 92.9.
