= CHLI-FM =

Community radio station in Rossland, British Columbia

Defunct
- Rossland, British Columbia; Canada
- Frequency: 101.1 MHz

Programming
- Format: Community radio

Ownership
- Owner: Rossland Community Radio Co-operative

History
- First air date: December 31, 2008
- Last air date: October 2013

Technical information
- ERP: 5 watts

CHLI-FM, or Rossland Community Radio Co-operative, was a volunteer-led co-operative community radio station in Rossland, British Columbia, Canada.

== History ==
The co-operative applied for a low-power broadcast license with the Canadian Radio-television and Telecommunications Commission, with the aim to broadcast at 5 watts of power on the FM dial at 101.1 MHz with the call letters CHLI. The station was given approval by the CRTC on May 15, 2008. As of March 2008, the co-op had more than 75 members and was housed in the Rossland United Church building. Rossland Radio Coop began official broadcasting on December 31, 2008.

The station was one of several new community radio stations launched in the Kootenay region in the 2000s. Others include CJLY-FM in Nelson, CFAD-FM in Salmo, CJHQ-FM in Nakusp and CIDO-FM in Creston.

On April 29, 2011, Rossland Radio Cooperative received CRTC approval to operate a new FM community radio station in Rossland, British Columbia on the frequency of 101.1 MHz.

In October 2013 the station was put on hiatus due to lack of interest and funds (according to their Facebook page). As of April 2014 it is still off-air, and the licence has since been deleted.

== Shows ==
RRC aired several Rossland-based shows, like Sesn-a-tonin, as well as a few syndicated programs, like Pacifica Radio's Democracy Now!, and Kootenay Coop Radio's food-issues program Deconstructing Dinner.
