= CJLY-FM =

Community radio station in Nelson, British Columbia

- Nelson, British Columbia; Canada
- Frequency: 93.5 MHz
- Branding: Kootenay Co-op Radio

Programming
- Format: Community radio

Ownership
- Owner: Kootenay Co-op Radio

History
- First air date: November 2000

Technical information
- Class: A1
- ERP: 70 watts
- HAAT: −761 metres (−2,497 ft)
- Repeaters: CJLY-FM-1 96.5 Kootenay Lake; VF2517 107.5 New Denver; VF2556 101.5 Crescent Valley

Links
- Webcast: Listen Live
- Website: kootenaycoopradio.com

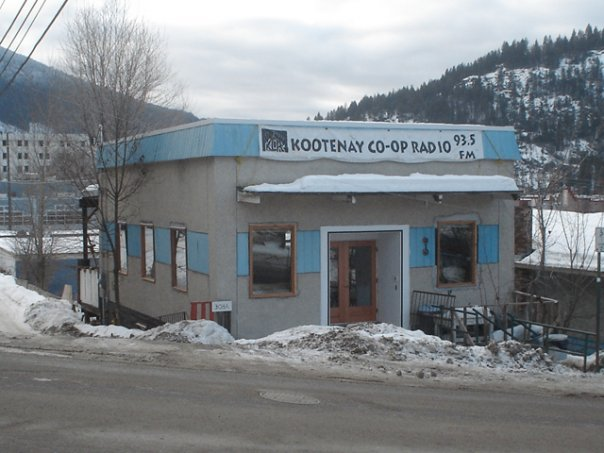
This building in Nelson is owned by Kootenay Coop Radio

CJLY-FM, known on-air as Kootenay Co-op Radio, is a Canadian community radio station, which broadcasts at 93.5 FM in Nelson, British Columbia. The station also has rebroadcasters on 96.5 in Crawford Bay and 107.5 in New Denver, and 101.5 in South Slocan.

The station is one of several community radio stations launched in the Kootenay region in the 2000s. Others include CHLI-FM in Rossland, CFAD-FM in Salmo, CJHQ-FM in Nakusp and CIDO-FM in Creston.

== History ==
CJLY was started by volunteers in December 1996 and incorporated as a non-profit service co-operative in June 1998 in Nelson. It started intermittent broadcasting in the Nelson region in February 1999, with a 28-day special event broadcast exemption by the CRTC, and finally went on the air full-time the following autumn. after being granted a permanent CRTC license in August 2000.

On November 6, 2000, the station began broadcasting about 18 hours a day at a power of 75 watts. In November 2004, CJLY expanded its range and began broadcasting in the Kootenay Lake region, north of Nelson, on a new FM frequency, 96.5 FM. In fall 2008, CJLY began broadcasting in the community of New Denver at 107.5 FM.

The organization purchased a building at #308a Hall St in Nelson in March 2006.

Kootenay Co-op Radio broadcasts in a mountainous region of British Columbia's southeast corner, and its terrestrial signal reaches settlements in the Purcell Mountains, Selkirk Mountains and Monashee Mountains.

== Structure ==
Kootenay Co-op Radio is cooperatively owned and operated by its members, who employ three staff for day-to-day operations. As of August 2026, Kootenay Co-op Radio has approximately 2,000 members and about 100 active volunteers.

CJLY is a member of the National Campus and Community Radio Association.

== Programming ==
Several national and internationally syndicated radio programs have been produced in the studios of CJLY, including Deconstructing Dinner, Canadian Voices and World Report.

Other notable shows that have been produced at KCR include:

- Sinixt Radio, a show hosted by members of the Sinixt First Nation,
- Pickin' & Grinnin, the region's bluegrass music show,
- By the People, a show about participatory democracy in the Kootenay region, The Writer's Show, hosted by Holley Rubinsky,
- The Rank and File Voice, a show about labour-related topics, and
- Kootenay Morning, a public affairs show spotlighting local issues, news and current events.

=== Podcasts ===
The station podcasts a select number of its spoken word programs on its podcasts page.

== Music charts ==
The KCR Music Department submits weekly music charts to !earshot, which is a project of the National Campus and Community Radio Association.
