= Chevery =

- Unconstituted locality
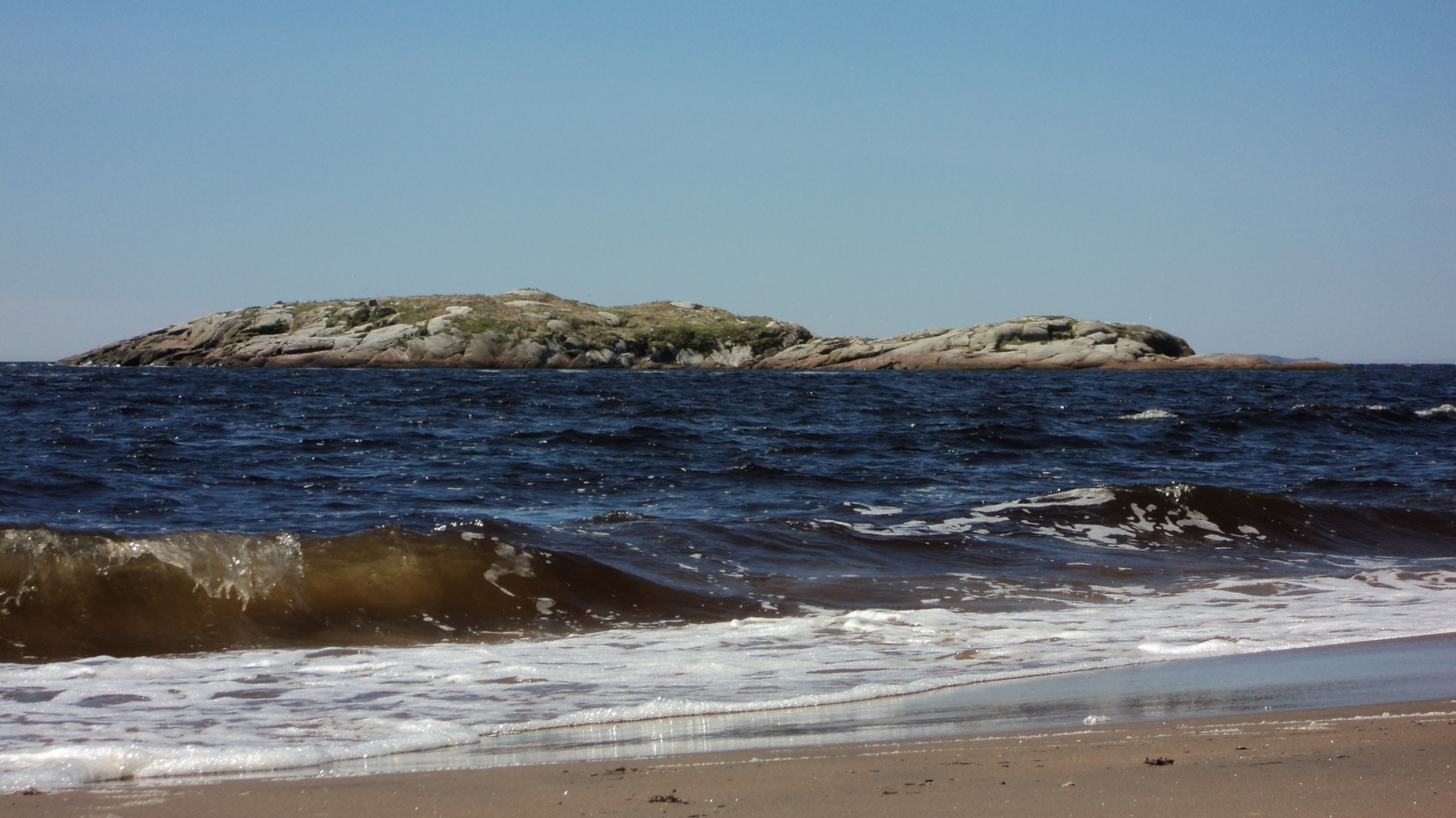

- Location within Quebec
- Coordinates: 50°28′07″N 59°36′58″W
- Country: Canada
- Province: Quebec
- Region: Côte-Nord
- RCM: Le Golfe-du-Saint-Laurent
- Municipality: Côte-Nord-du-Golfe-du-Saint-Laurent

Government
  - Federal riding: Côte-Nord—Kawawachikamach—Nitassinan
  - Prov. riding: Duplessis

Area
  - Land: 3.64 km^{2} (1.41 sq mi)

Population (2011)
  - Total: 251
  - Density: 68.9/km^{2} (178/sq mi)
  - Change (2006–11): N/A
  - Dwellings: 123
- Time zone: UTC−04:00 (AST)
- Postal code(s): G0G 1G0
- Area codes: 418 and 581

Chevery is an unconstituted locality within the municipality of Côte-Nord-du-Golfe-du-Saint-Laurent in the Côte-Nord region of Quebec, Canada.

Chevery is the administrative centre of Côte-Nord-du-Golfe-du-Saint-Laurent municipality, located at the mouth of the Nétagamiou River. Previously known as Netagamu River, the place was renamed in 1971 after captain Jean-Baptiste Chevery who in 1747 sailed along the coast visiting numerous posts.

Chevery was the site of an early French fur trading post in the mid-17th century, but after that fort was abandoned, there was no further development on the site until the 1930s, when an experimental farm was established on the Cross River by William Anderson. Residents of several isolated communities in the area, including Gull Cliff Island and Aylmer Sound, subsequently moved to Chevery due to the need for improved access to government services.

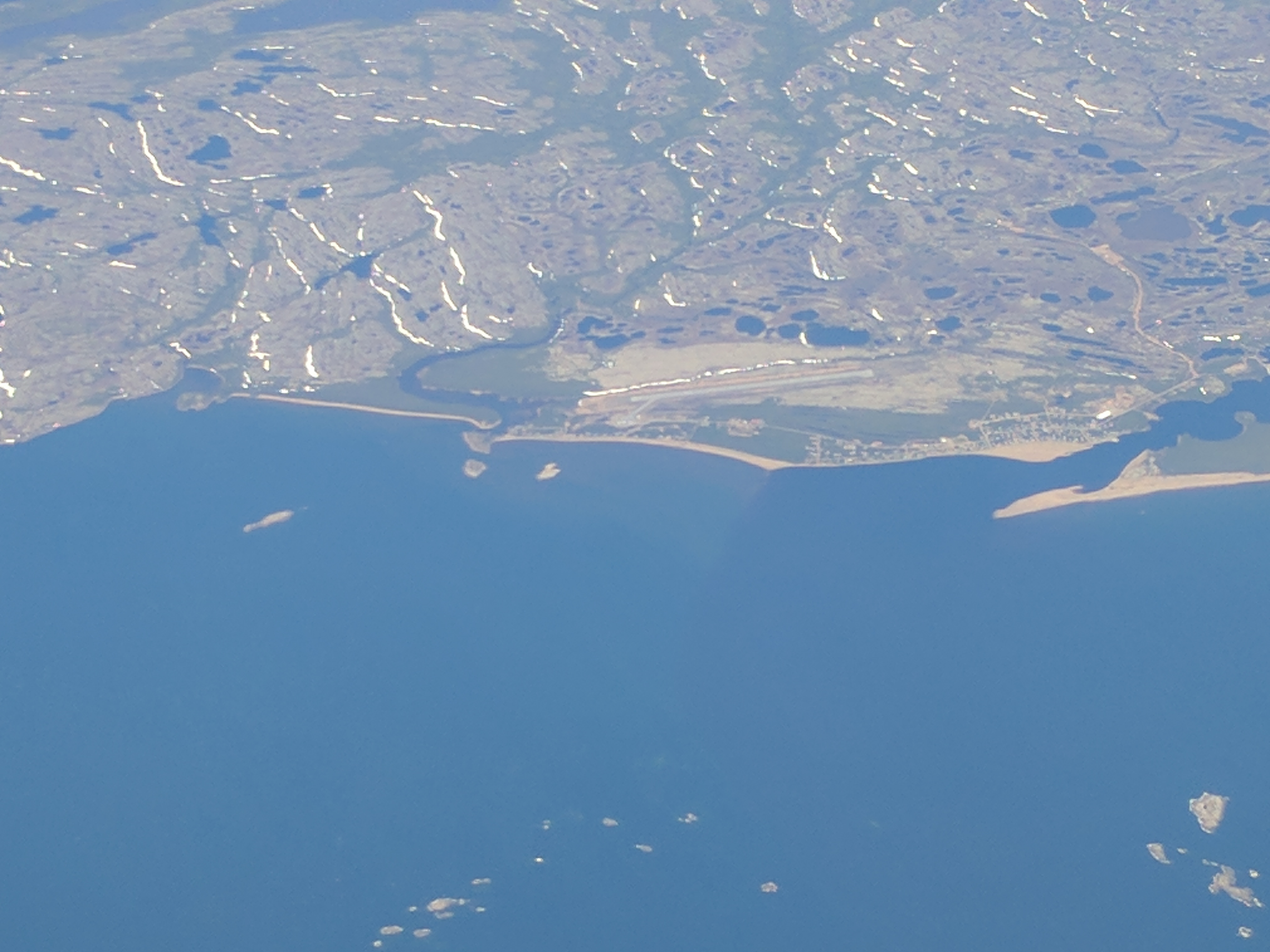
A view of Chevery from the air

The community of Chevery on the Gulf Saint Lawrence has a network of inland wetlands, forest and tundra. From Chevery, one can access trails and beaches through the northern landscape of the MRC du Golfe-du-Saint-Laurent. Chevery is known for the Netagamiou River and its 50 foot high falls that can be accessed from the Bob Nunez Misty River Trail.

Another natural feature at the western end of Chevery is the "Sterant Island" Tern Colony. Only 100 meters off the beach, Sterant Island is easily visible for avid conservationists and ornithologists who wish to observe, study and photograph the impressive tern colony for which the island gets its name. Locals speculate that the name "Sterant Island" is an anglicized version of a French name "Île au Sterne". Local records confirm that the Terns return annually to Chevery the third week of May and remain there to hatch and raise their young in the bait rich waters of Chevery during the summer. The terns leave gradually in early September and the colony is usually deserted by the mid-September each year.

Although predominantly Anglophone, Chevery has a significant number of Francophone and bilingual residents. None of Chevery's 251 residents are trilingual.

== Demographics ==
In the 2021 Census of Population conducted by Statistics Canada, Chevery had a population of 226 living in 104 of its 118 total private dwellings, a change of −4.2% from its 2016 population of 236. With a land area of 3.93 km^{2} (1.52 sq mi), it had a population density of 57.5/km^{2} (148.9/sq mi) in 2021.

== Education ==
Centre de Services scolaire du Littoral operates Netagamiou School (anglophone and francophone) in Chevery.
