= CIAU-FM =

Radio station in Radisson, Quebec

Coordinates: 53°47′47″N 77°38′15″W

- Radisson, Quebec; Canada
- Frequency: 103.1 Mhz
- Branding: 103,1 FM

Programming
- Language: French
- Format: community radio

Ownership
- Owner: Radio communautaire de Radisson

Technical information
- Class: LP
- ERP: horizontal polarization only: 17 watts
- HAAT: 10 meters (33 ft)

Links
- Website: www.ciaufm.ca

CIAU-FM is a French-language community radio station that operates at 103.1 FM in Radisson, Quebec, Canada.

Owned by Radio communautaire de Radisson, the station received CRTC approval in 1997.

The station is a member of the Association des radiodiffuseurs communautaires du Québec.
