= CKRL-FM =

Community radio station in Quebec City, Quebec

Coordinates: 46.822576°N 71.226481°W

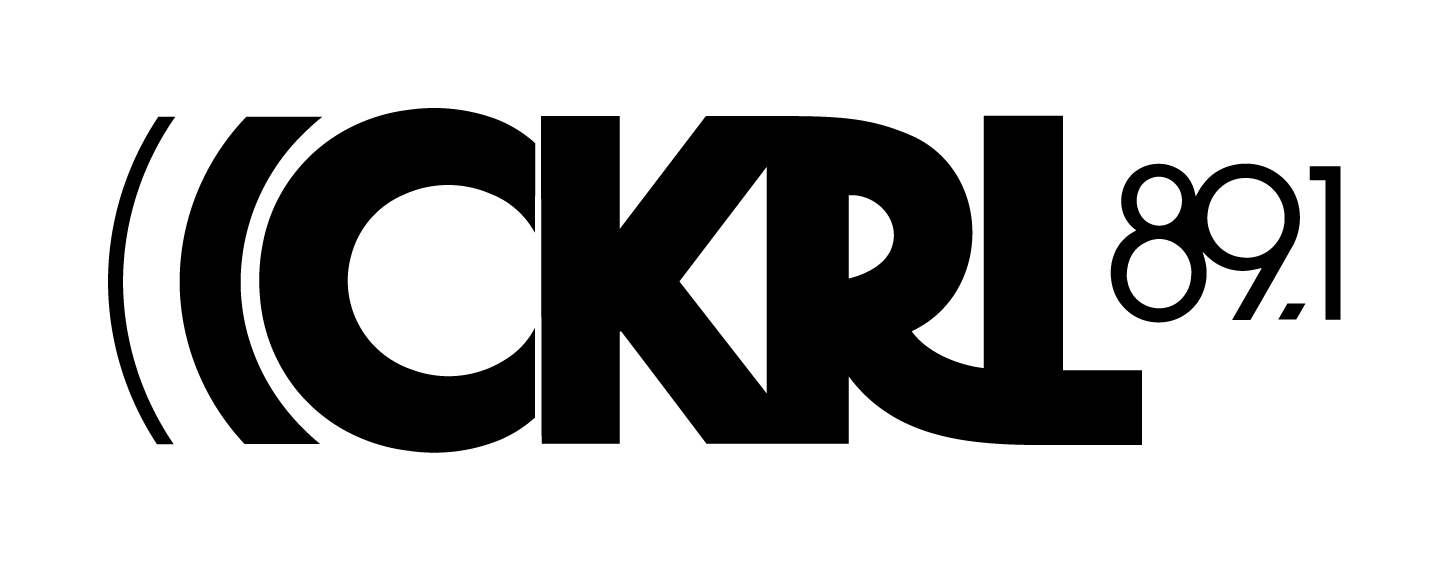
- Quebec City, Quebec; Canada
- Frequency: 89.1 MHz

Programming
- Language: French
- Format: Community radio

Ownership
- Owner: CKRL-MF 89,1 inc.

History
- First air date: February 15, 1973

Technical information
- Licensing authority: CRTC
- Class: A
- ERP: 1,495 watts
- HAAT: 157.5 metres (517 ft)

Links
- Website: ckrl.qc.ca

CKRL-FM is a French-language Canadian radio station located in Quebec City, Quebec.

The station operates under a community radio licence and is owned by a non-profit group known as CKRL-MF 89,1 inc. It broadcasts on 89.1 MHz with an effective radiated power of 1,495 watts (class A) using an omnidirectional antenna, broadcasting from Edifice Marie-Guyart in downtown Quebec City.

CKRL-FM began broadcasting on 15 February 1973 at 5pm and was originally a campus radio station for the Université Laval. This situation ceased in 1984, although the name of the corporation remained "Campus Laval FM inc." for many years thereafter. The station 94.3 CHYZ-FM became the new campus radio station for the university in 1997.

The station is a member of the Association des radiodiffuseurs communautaires du Québec.
