= CIOE-FM =

Community radio station in Lower Sackville, Nova Scotia

Coordinates: 44.7572°N 63.6567°W

97.5 "The Blend" (CIOE-FM)
- Lower Sackville, Nova Scotia; Canada
- Broadcast area: Halifax Regional Municipality
- Frequency: 97.5 MHz
- Branding: 97.5 CIOE "The Blend"

Programming
- Language: English
- Format: Community Radio

Ownership
- Owner: Cobequid Radio Society

History
- First air date: December 2014
- Call sign meaning: "Owie"

Technical information
- ERP: 250 watts
- HAAT: 25.1 meters (82 ft)

Links
- Webcast: Listen Live
- Website: cioe975.ca

CIOE-FM, branded as 97.5 CIOE "The Blend" is a radio station broadcasting a community radio format on the frequency of 97.5 MHz in Lower Sackville, Nova Scotia, Canada. It also serves the surrounding communities of Bedford, Sackville, Beaver Bank, Fall River, Wellington, Hammonds Plains, Mount Uniacke, Timberlea, Clayton Park and Rockingham.

On May 28, 2014, Cobequid Radio Society (Cobequid Radio), a not-for-profit organization controlled by its board of directors, filed an application for a broadcasting licence to operate an English-language community FM radio station in Lower Sackville, Nova Scotia, using 88.7 MHz (channel 204A1) with an effective radiated power (ERP) of 250 watts (non-directional antenna with an effective height above average terrain (EHAAT) of 25.1 metres). On July 4, 2014, the CRTC approved Cobequid Radio Society's application to move to 97.5 MHz. All other technical parameters would remain unchanged.

On October 1st, 2026, CIOE changed its branding from 97.5 Community Radio to 97.5 CIOE "The Blend."
