= Port-Menier =

Settlement on Anticosti Island, Quebec, Canada

Coordinates: 49°49′N 64°21′W

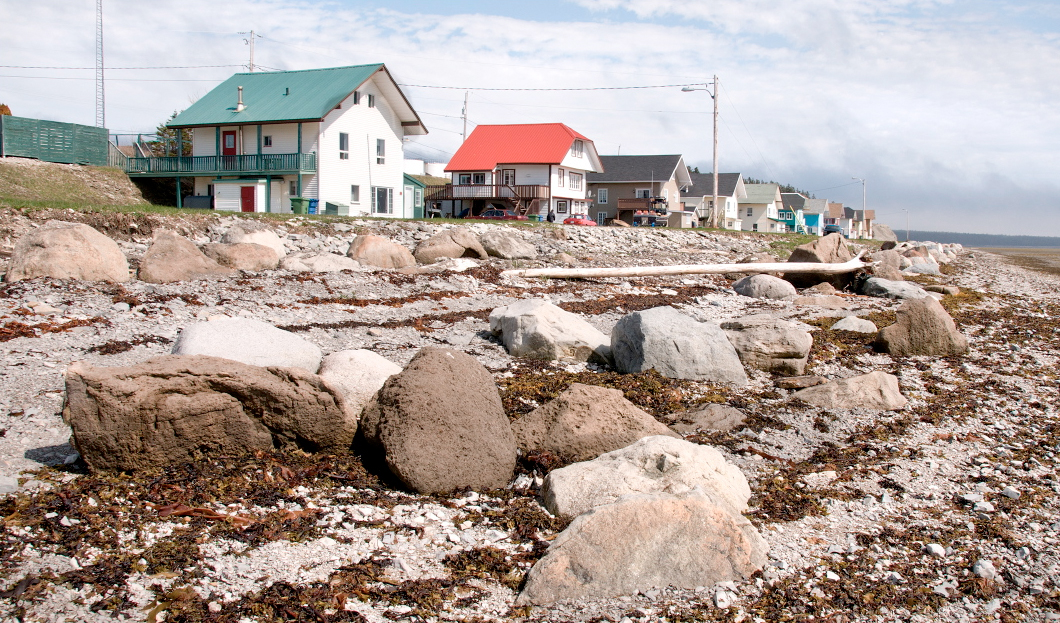
Port-Menier in 2013

Port-Menier, Quebec (French pronunciation: [pɔʁ mənje]) is a town at the south-western end of Anticosti Island, Quebec, Canada, part of the L'Île-d'Anticosti municipality. The port village was built during the late 19th century by French chocolate maker Henri Menier.

The village is the hub of Anticosti Island. Its population doubles in the summer with seasonal workers and tourists. The economic mainstays are outdoor tourism, especially deer hunting, and forestry/logging. Services available in Port-Menier are: general and grocery stores, gas station, banking (Caisse populaire Desjardins), car rental (Location Sauvageau, STL) two restaurants and bungalow “Les reskapés”. There is one local fisherman who fished for lobster, which is abundant on the island. Some local villagers trap hare. (No dogs are allowed on the island).

Port-Menier can be reached via a ferry that runs between Sept-Îles, Port-Menier and Havre-Saint-Pierre, as well as other destinations along the north shore of the Saint Lawrence River. This service is operated by Relais Nordik and runs from April through January. The nearby Port-Menier Airport also provides transportation options for the town.

== History ==
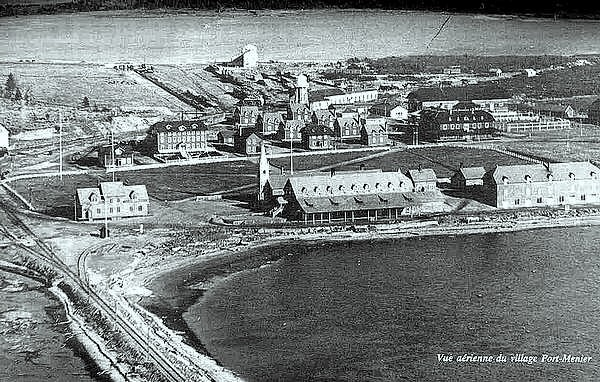
Port-Menier, Anticosti Island, around 1920

In 1680, Louis Jolliet became the first owner and Seigneurial Lord of the entire Anticosti Island. Together with him, the first few settlers arrived on the island. But no significant development took place until 1895 when Henri Menier bought the island and hoped to set up a seignory that could be self-supporting.

He first established a settlement at Bay Sainte-Claire in 1895 but the bay proved too shallow for the large ships he would need. In 1900, he moved the settlement to Ellis Bay and established Port-Menier along the waterfront with a 1,000 metre (1000 yard) wharf. He invested a substantial amount of money to construct a sawmill to service the logging operations that harvested softwood timber for building lumber and Wood pulp for the manufacture of paper products. The community was centred on a new cannery business designed to take advantage of the abundant supply of fish and lobsters. The town had its own hospital, school, Roman Catholic church, general store, bank, bakery, hotel, plus homes and rooming houses for the workers, and a 30-room Scandinavian-style mansion for himself. Once completed, the island was home to 800 permanent residents, most of whom were French Canadians. Residents and businesses obtained supplies from a sailing ship Menier operated between Quebec City and the Gaspé, and obtained coal from the mines at Sydney, Nova Scotia.

After Henri Menier's death, the island and the village remained in his family until 1926 after which it became property of a succession of logging companies. The village was thereby not much more than a company town and saw little development. In 1974, the Quebec government bought the island and set up a working municipal council in 1984.

== Waterway ==
Ports of the Gulf of St. Lawrence, on the Côte-Nord Shore: Blanc-Sablon, Harrington Harbor, Natashquan, Havre-Saint-Pierre, Mingan, Port-Menier (Anticosti Island), Cap-aux-Meules (Îles-de-la-Madeleine).

== Education ==
Commission scolaire du Littoral operates St-Joseph School (francophone).
