= Tête-à-la-Baleine =

- Unconstituted locality
- Location within Quebec Location within Canada
- Coordinates: 50°42′10″N 59°19′23″W
- Country: Canada
- Province: Quebec
- Region: Côte-Nord
- RCM: Le Golfe-du-Saint-Laurent
- Municipality: Côte-Nord-du-Golfe-du-Saint-Laurent

Government
  - Federal riding: Côte-Nord—Kawawachikamach—Nitassinan
  - Prov. riding: Duplessis

Area
  - Land: 9.19 km^{2} (3.55 sq mi)

Population (2011)
  - Total: 129
  - Density: 14/km^{2} (36/sq mi)
  - Change (2006–11): ▼34.8%
  - Dwellings: 54
- Time zone: UTC−04:00 (AST)
- Postal code(s): G0G 2W0
- Area codes: 418 and 581

Tête-à-la-Baleine (French pronunciation: [tɛt a la balɛn]) is an unconstituted locality within the municipality of Côte-Nord-du-Golfe-du-Saint-Laurent in the Côte-Nord region of Quebec, Canada.

Tête-à-la-Baleine, occasionally known as Whale Head in English, was settled in the 19th century after Michael Kenty bought the local trading post from the Labrador Company. Initial settlement mostly took place on the nearby islands in the Gulf of Saint Lawrence, although eventually most residents moved to the community's current site on the mainland in order to be closer to sources of wood and food in the winter. However, some residents still move back and forth, residing on the islands in summer and in the mainland community in winter.

The community is named after a nearby island in the Gros Mécatina Archipelago that resembles a whale head.

There is a 17 km (11 mi) section of Quebec Highway 138 connecting through the community between the Tête-à-la-Baleine Airport and ferry terminal.

== Demographics ==
In the 2021 Census of Population conducted by Statistics Canada, Tête-à-la-Baleine had a population of 119 living in 59 of its 79 total private dwellings, a change of −17.9% from its 2016 population of 145. With a land area of 10.69 km^{2} (4.13 sq mi), it had a population density of 11.1/km^{2} (28.8/sq mi) in 2021.

== Education ==
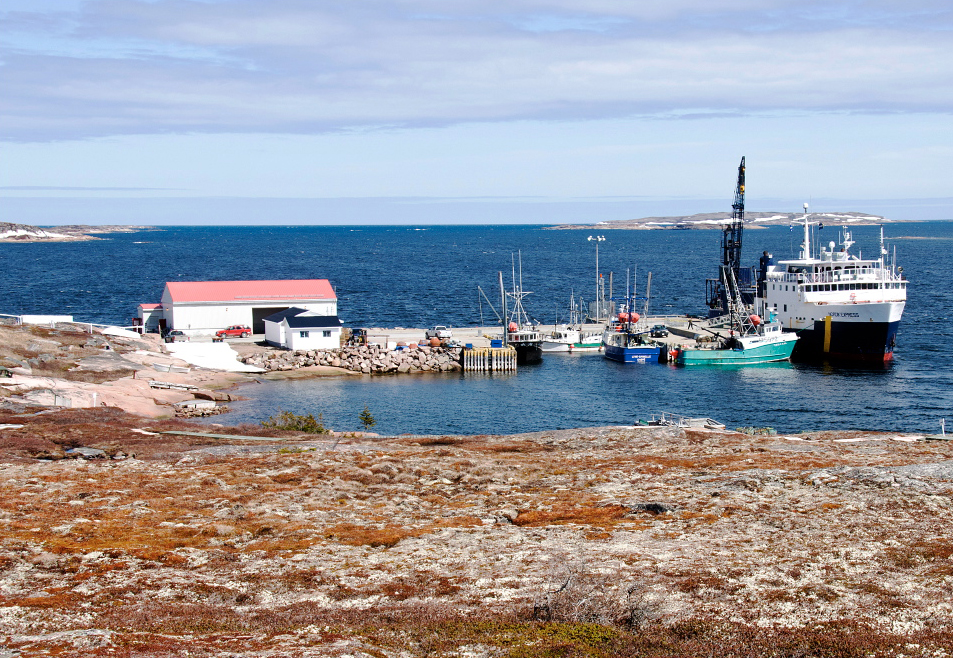
Quay at Tête-à-la-Baleine

Commission scolaire du Littoral operates the Gabriel-Dionne School (Francophone).
