= CFED =

CFED may refer to:

- Corporation for Enterprise Development, a non-profit organization in the United States,
- CFED-FM, a radio station in Edmonton, Alberta, Canada
