= January 2018 North American blizzard =

Winter weather event

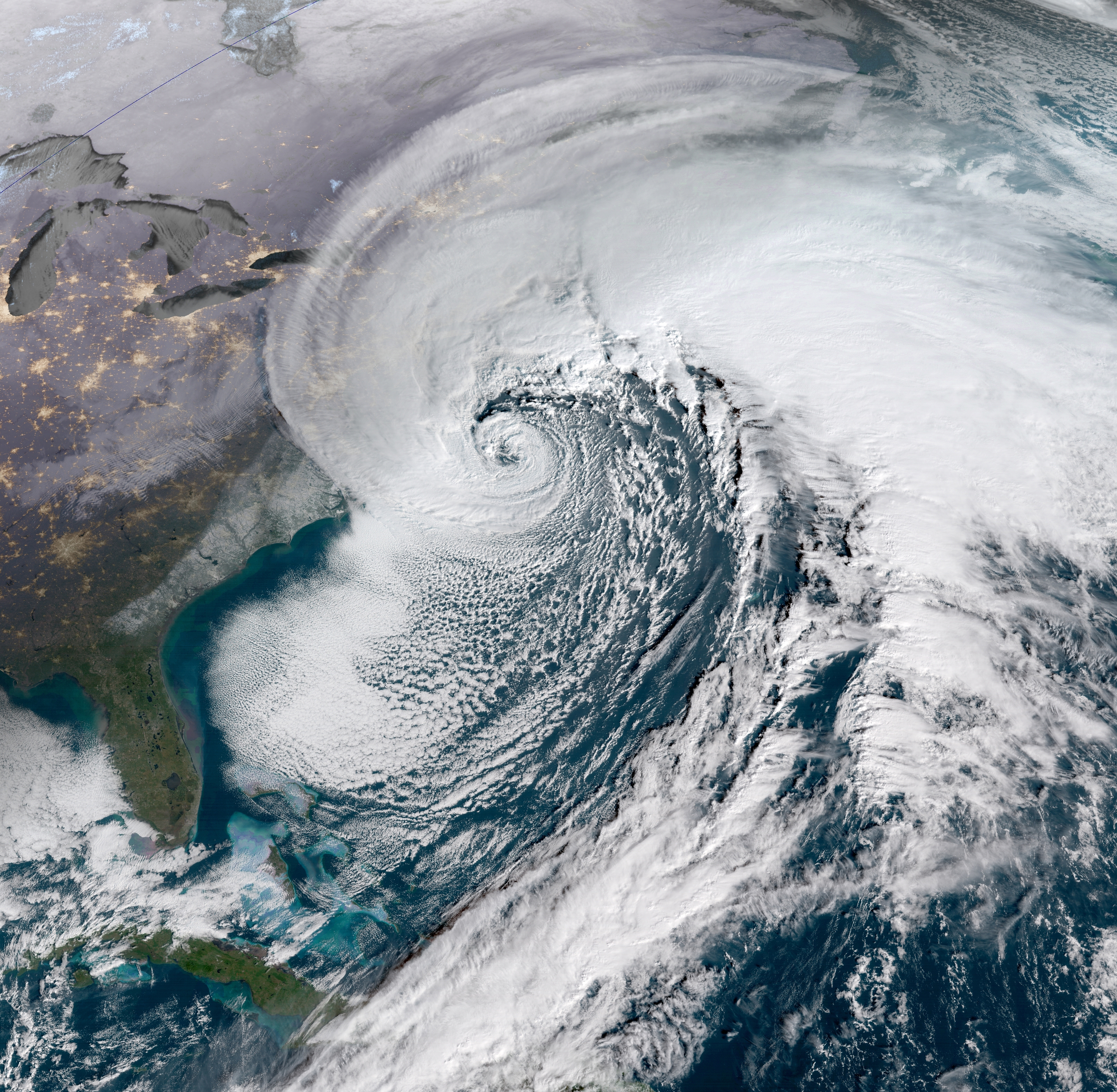
- GOES-16 satellite image of the blizzard rapidly deepening off the Northeastern United States at 13:45 UTC (8:45 a.m EST) on January 4, 2018.

Meteorological history
- Formed: January 2, 2018
- Dissipated: January 6, 2018

Category 1 "Notable" blizzard
- Regional snowfall index: 2.55 (NOAA)
- Highest winds: 90 mph (150 km/h) (1-minute sustained winds)
- Highest gusts: 126 mph (203 km/h) in Saint-Joseph-du-Moine, Nova Scotia
- Lowest pressure: 949 mbar (hPa); 28.02 inHg
- Max. snowfall: Snowfall – 24.0 in (61 cm) in Bathurst, New Brunswick; Ice – 0.5 in (1.3 cm) in Brunswick, Georgia

Overall effects
- Fatalities: 22 total
- Damage: $1.1 billion (2018 USD)
- Areas affected: Cuba, The Bahamas, Bermuda, Southeastern United States, Northeastern United States, New England, Atlantic Canada
- Power outages: ≥ 300,000
- Part of the 2017–18 North American winter

The January 2018 North American blizzard caused widespread severe disruption and blizzard conditions across much of the East Coasts of the United States and Canada in early January 2018. The storm dropped up to 2 feet (24 in; 61 cm) of snow in the Mid-Atlantic states, New England, and Atlantic Canada, while areas as far south as southern Georgia and far northern Florida had brief wintry precipitation, with 0.1 inches (2.5 mm) of snow measured officially in Tallahassee, Florida. The storm originated on January 3 as an area of low pressure off the coast of the Southeast. Moving swiftly to the northeast, the storm explosively deepened while moving parallel to the Eastern Seaboard, causing significant snowfall accumulations. The storm received various unofficial names, such as Winter Storm Grayson, Blizzard of 2018 and Storm Brody. The storm was also dubbed a "historic bomb cyclone".

On January 3, blizzard warnings were issued for a large swath of the coast, ranging from Norfolk, Virginia all the way up to Maine. Several states, including North Carolina, New Jersey, New York, and Massachusetts declared states of emergency due to the powerful storm. Hundreds of flights were canceled ahead of the blizzard. Overall, 22 people were confirmed to have been killed due to the storm, and at least 300,000 residents in the United States lost power in total, causing beaches and schools to be cancelled.

== Meteorological history ==
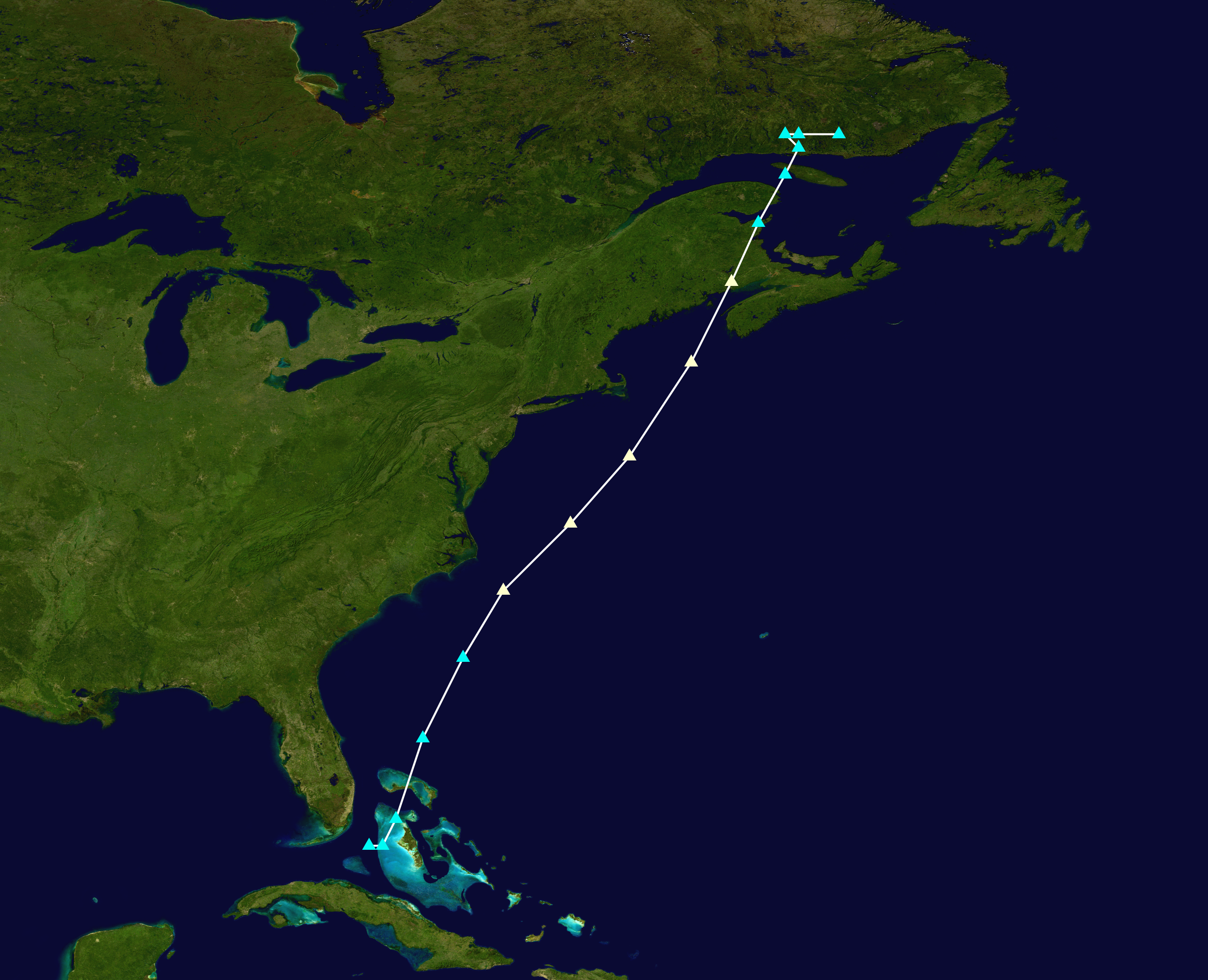
Map plotting the storm's track and intensity, according to the Saffir–Simpson scale Map key Saffir–Simpson scale Tropical depression (≤38 mph, ≤62 km/h) Tropical storm (39–73 mph, 63–118 km/h) Category 1 (74–95 mph, 119–153 km/h) Category 2 (96–110 mph, 154–177 km/h) Category 3 (111–129 mph, 178–208 km/h) Category 4 (130–156 mph, 209–251 km/h) Category 5 (≥157 mph, ≥252 km/h) Unknown Storm type Tropical cyclone Subtropical cyclone Extratropical cyclone, remnant low, tropical disturbance, or monsoon depression

Early on January 1, the Weather Prediction Center (WPC) began to anticipate the possibility of a northward-tracking area of low pressure that would bring wintry precipitation to much of the East Coast of the United States in the first week of January, exacerbating an extended period of anomalously cold weather. Due to modeling confining of precipitation to relatively narrow bands at the time, initial forecasts on the storm's impacts were uncertain. The storm's development was forecast to originate from the eastward progression of a shortwave trough originating from the northern Rocky Mountains, strengthening due to the presence of a longwave trough situated over the Eastern United States. However, as the anticipated event drew closer, the system's genesis grew increasingly complex with the development of two separate disturbances in the jet stream over the upper Mississippi Valley and the eastern extent of the Rocky Mountains; these two would shape the eventual coverage of wintry precipitation associated with the storm. As the troughs pushed eastward, frontogenesis along the trough and a resulting increase in moisture allowed for freezing rain to commence over areas of northern Florida and southern Georgia early on January 3. Later that day, rapid cyclogenesis led to the formation of a 995 millibar low-pressure area north of the Bahamas and east of Jacksonville, Florida, with cloud cover quickly expanding to the north and east ahead of the storm's center; consequently, the WPC began issuing regular storm summaries at 21:00 UTC (4:00 p.m. EST) on January 3.

After forming, the extratropical cyclone continued to explosively deepen, tracking northward parallel to the United States East Coast. By the morning of January 4, the powerful storm system had deepened by 53 mbar (hPa; 1.57 inHg) in 21 hours—one of the fastest rates ever observed in the Western Atlantic—to a pressure of 952 mbar (952 hPa; 28.1 inHg), with a coastal cold front focusing heavy snowfall and thundersnow along immediate coastal regions. The drop in pressure was over twice the threshold (24 mbar (24 hPa; 0.71 inHg) in 24 hours) for bombogenesis. Onshore, the inland extent of wintry precipitation gradually increased as the storm intensified. As the day progressed, the development of several intense snowbands allowed for heavy snowfall rates of up to 3 in (7.6 cm) per hour over New England, which were enhanced further by the influx of warm low-level air due to the cyclone's circulation. The storm bottomed out at a pressure of 950 mbar (950 hPa; 28 inHg) when it was centered about 120 mi (190 km) southeast of Nantucket Island, with an eye-like feature evident. The cyclone's intensity held steady as it moved north into the Bay of Fundy late on January 4. As the storm moved out of New England and began to weaken, the winds and snow began to diminish. Afterwards, it opened up into a trough on January 6.

== Preparations and impact ==
All weather alerts issued by the NWS from January 2–5 in the Eastern U.S. during the winter storm
Blizzard warning
Winter storm warning
Winter weather advisory

The blizzard produced snowfall and other forms of frozen precipitation across much of the United States Eastern Seaboard. As of the WPC's fifth winter storm summary, the highest official snowfall amount recorded is 17.0 in (43 cm) in Cape May Court House, New Jersey; however, a snowfall total of 52 cm (20 in) was reported Bathurst, New Brunswick. Freezing rain totals peaked at 0.5 in (1.3 cm) in Brunswick, Georgia and near Folkston, Georgia. At least twenty-two fatalities were attributed to the storm, including at least eight car accident-related deaths. At least 4,020 flights were cancelled across the United States, with a majority of cancellations caused by the extensive winter storm. Insurers estimate that claims relating to coastal flooding from the storm will be more than those from snow-related damage.

=== Southeastern United States ===
==== Florida and Georgia ====
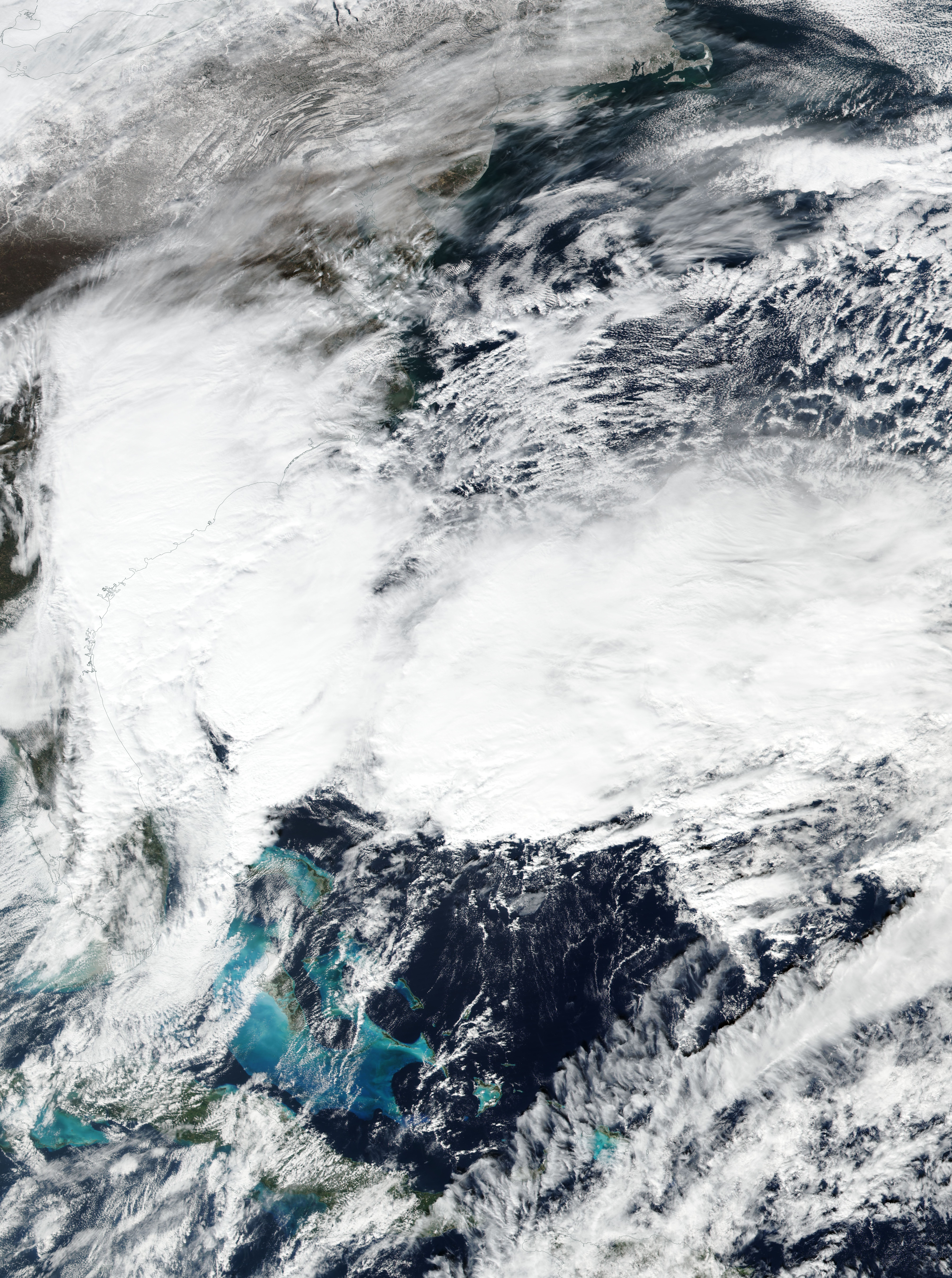
The developing nor'easter east of Florida on January 3

Florida A&M University and Florida State University, announced closures for January 3. Governor of Georgia Nathan Deal declared a state of emergency for 28 counties. 1.2 inches (3.0 cm) of snowfall was recorded at Savannah, Georgia, while Tallahassee, Florida received 0.1 inches (0.25 cm) of snow officially. For this region, it was the first time snow fell since December 1989. Additionally, this is the first recorded measurable snowfall in Tallahassee during the month of January based on records dating back to April 1885.

The snowfall forced the closure of Savannah-Hilton Head International Airport, cancelling 78 incoming and outgoing flights. Ice accumulation was reported as far south as northern Levy County, Florida. Widespread power outages affected much of the Southeast U.S. coast during the storm's infancy; nearly 100,000 electricity customers were without power in the Florida-Georgia border region, including over 6,000 in Glynn County, Georgia. Heavy icing downed trees and power lines throughout St. Simons Island, Georgia, causing extensive power outages. Power outages impacted Nassau County, Florida to a similar extent, prompting the opening of an emergency shelter in Hilliard, Florida. Four Central Florida counties also opened cold weather shelters when temperatures fell below 45 °F (7 °C). Icy conditions forced numerous road closures, including an 80 mi (130 km) stretch of Interstate 10 between Tallahassee, Florida and Live Oak, Florida. All lanes of Interstate 75 closed in Hamilton County, Florida to facilitate de-icing.

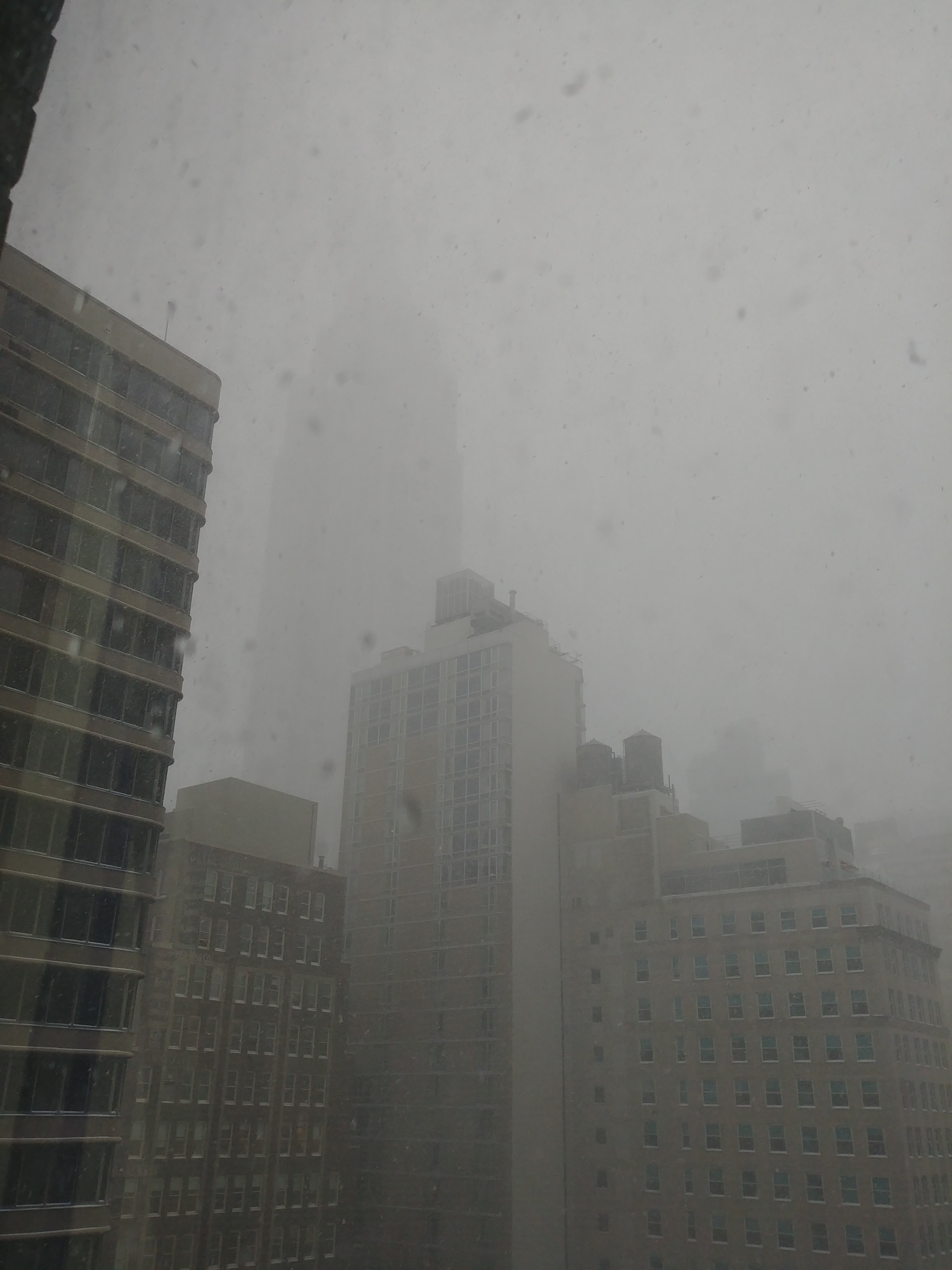
The Empire State Building barely visible from the 12th floor of an office building 2 blocks north during the peak of the storm due to near whiteout conditions.

==== The Carolinas ====
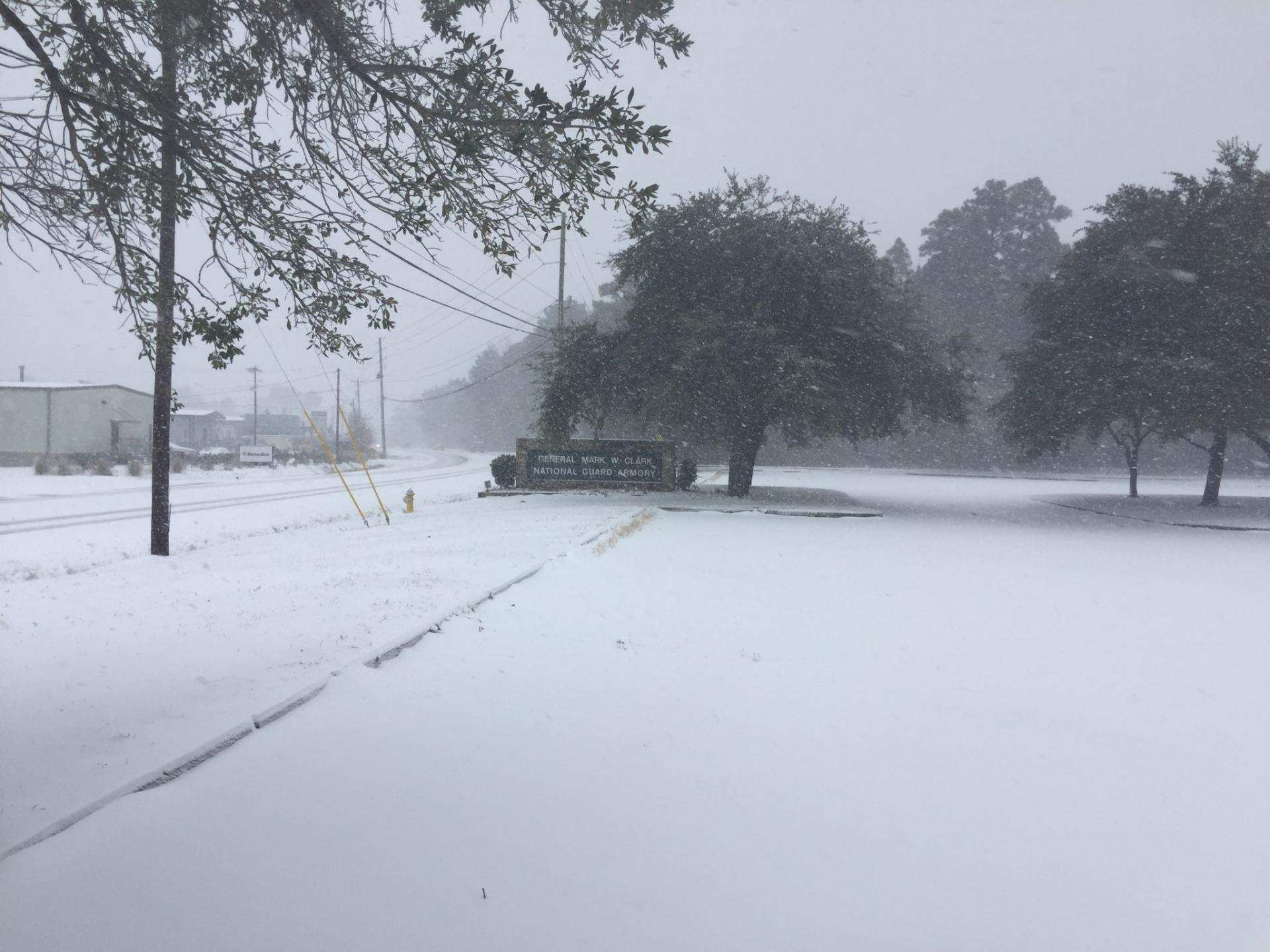
Snow cover at the National Guard armory in North Charleston, South Carolina.

Snowfall in South Carolina peaked at 7.3 in (19 cm) in Summerville. Charleston recorded the third highest daily snowfall total in its history at 5.3 in (13 cm) and the highest total since 1989. The runways of Joint Base Charleston, used jointly with Charleston International Airport, were closed by the United States Air Force. The airport closed for 4 days. A state of emergency was declared and a curfew enforced for much of Dorchester County. On January 4, the South Carolina National Guard was deployed to assist impacted areas and the South Carolina Highway Patrol and South Carolina Department of Transportation to recover vehicles. One person was killed in a traffic collision on Interstate 95 in Clarendon County due to icy road conditions following the storm's passage. Governor of North Carolina Roy Cooper activated the state's emergency operations center on January 3 and declared a state of emergency for 54 counties. Due to the inclement conditions, 66 North Carolina school districts issued cancellations, affecting thousands of students. Local snowfalls in excess of 0.5 in (1.3 cm) occurred across the eastern half of the state. Wilmington, North Carolina observed 3.8 in (9.7 cm) of snowfall, marking the city's highest total since 2011. Along the Outer Banks, gusts in excess of 70 mph (110 km/h) caused rough seas, resulting in coastal flooding. Water levels rose 3 ft (0.91 m) above normal in Buxton, North Carolina. The hazardous weather led to the Wright Brothers National Memorial closing for two days. Four people were killed in the state, including two each in Moore and Beaufort counties and one in Surf City. At the height of the storm, around 20,000 utility customers lost power in the state. Poor driving conditions resulted in around 900 vehicle crashes across North Carolina.

=== Mid-Atlantic states ===
==== Virginia and Maryland ====
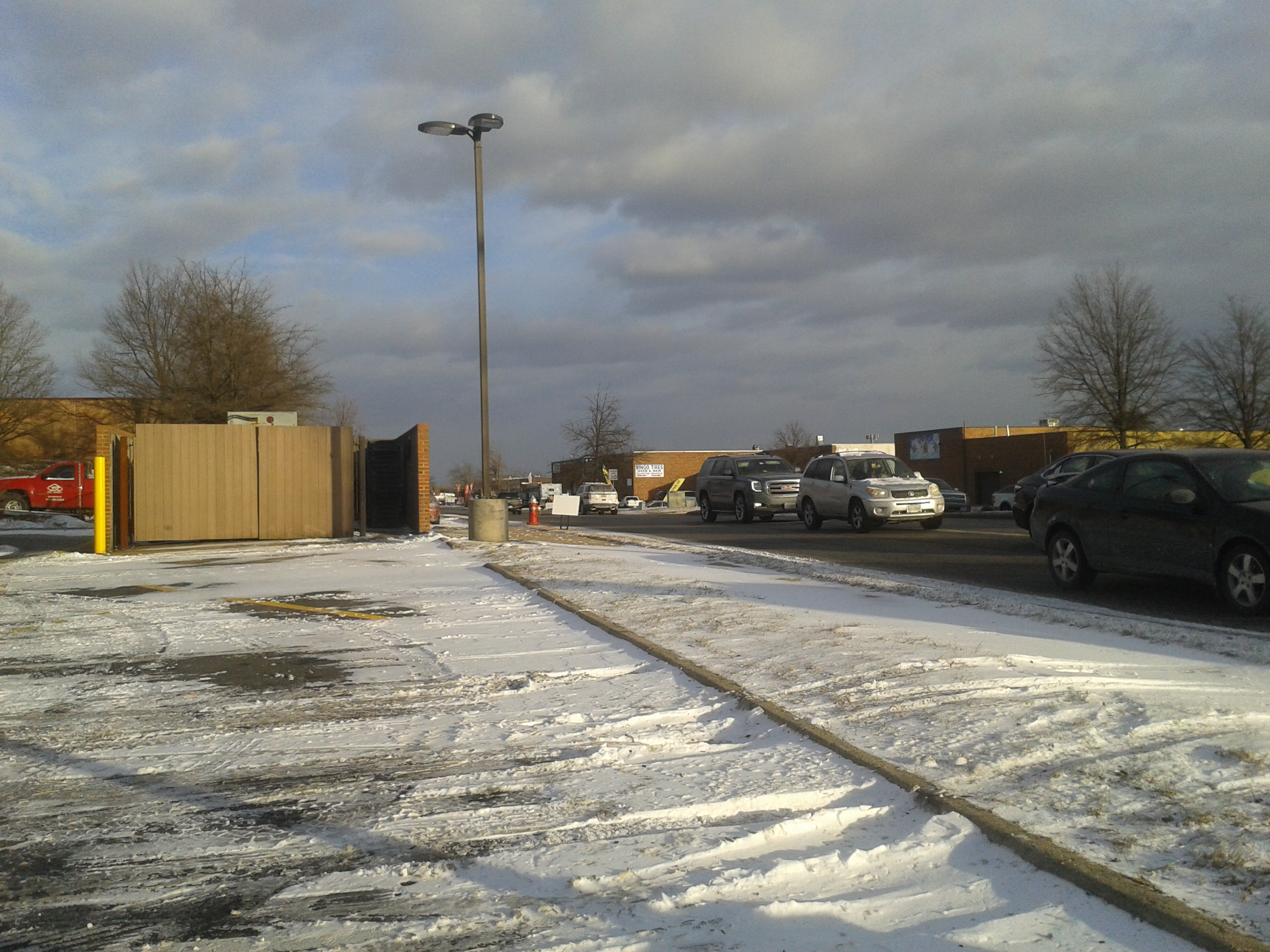
Aftermath of the blizzard in Newington, Virginia.

Governor of Virginia Terry McAuliffe declared a state of emergency in the state on January 3. In Virginia Beach, the storm maintained gusts of 50–55 mph (80–89 km/h) for several hours. In one 24-hour period, 118 crashes occurred in the Hampton Roads area, with another 121 disabled vehicles reported. Across the entirety of the state, Virginia troopers responded to 245 vehicular collisions. Gusts in the Hampton Roads area peaked at 69 mph (111 km/h) in Tangier, with lesser gusts farther inland. Due to the local geography, water levels in Chesapeake Bay fell in response to the storm's circulation passing to the east; the Patapsco River near Fort McHenry fell 3.49 ft (1.06 m) below the mean low water level, reaching its lowest height since 1989. The United States Coast Guard restricted maritime access to the Port of Baltimore from the evening of January 3 into January 5.

==== New York ====
New York City encountered 30 mph (48 km/h) winds, and John F. Kennedy International Airport temporarily suspended flights due to whiteout conditions, and the Statue of Liberty and Ellis Island closed early due to the storms as well. Central Park recorded 9.8 inches (25 cm) of snow from this storm. Governor of New York Andrew Cuomo declared a state of emergency for Westchester County, New York City, and Long Island. Islip on Long Island, NY reached a total of 16 inches (41 cm) of snow; however, tropical storm-force winds blew the snow into banks as high as 3 feet (0.91 m) in certain areas.

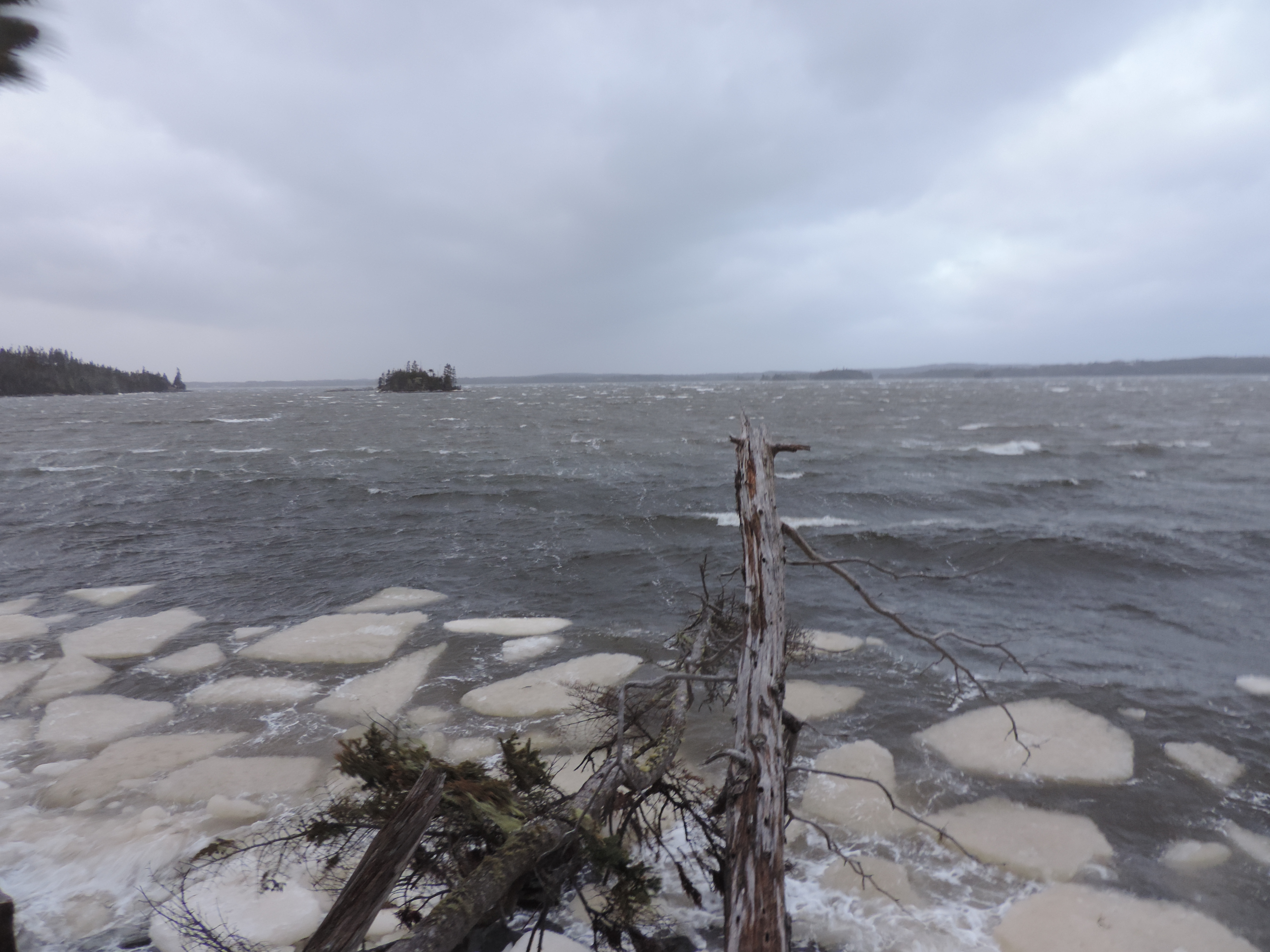
Waves breaking in Jeddore Harbour during the storm on January 5.

==== New Jersey ====
In New Jersey, many school closures took places ahead of the blizzard on January 3, especially towards the coastal areas of the state, due to expected snow totals of 6–12 inches (15–30 cm) and gusty winds being predicted. Up to 3,000 flights in the state were cancelled, with Newark Liberty International Airport registering 817 such cancellations. Due to the storm, United Airlines waived airline fees for people wanting to reschedule their flights as a result. Governor Chris Christie later declared a state of emergency for Monmouth, Ocean and Cape May counties on January 4 as the storm worsened, and said all state offices would be closed, in addition to deploying hundreds of snow removal equipment to the hardest-hit counties. The state police reported dozens of crashes throughout the day and dozens of residential aid requests as well. As much as 18 inches (46 cm) of snow fell in parts of New Jersey, with the largest totals closer to the coastline. Strong gusty winds also impacted the state.

=== New England ===
Being the most geographically proximate to the storm's track, Massachusetts bore the highest impacts of all American states. Winds gusted to hurricane-force at 76 miles per hour (122 km/h) on Nantucket and over 70 mph (110 km/h) on mainland Massachusetts.

In Connecticut, the National Weather Service office in Bridgeport recorded 9.0 inches (23 cm) of snow and wind gusts to 52 miles per hour (84 km/h).

At least 17.0 inches (43 cm) of snow fell on the Boston area, and 14.1 inches (36 cm) fell in Providence, Rhode Island. In Boston, a storm tide of 15.16 ft (4.62 m) was recorded during the blizzard which flooded areas of the financial district, including a subway station. This beat the previous record set in 1978 by the Blizzard of 1978. Significant coastal flooding occurred in Maine and New Hampshire.

A National Hockey League game between the Boston Bruins and Florida Panthers was postponed as a result of the storm.

=== Atlantic Canada ===
From New England the storm moved on to Atlantic Canada on January 4 and 5. Heavy snow fell in New Brunswick, peaking at 60 centimeters (24 in) in Bathurst. Sydney reported snowfall rates of up to 8 cm (3.1 in) per hour, in heavy bands of thundersnow. While snowfall amounts closer to the Atlantic coast of Nova Scotia were very low, winds gusting up to 203 km/h (126 mph) were reported in Saint-Joseph-du-Moine, causing widespread power outages. At the peak of the storm, nearly 130,000 Nova Scotia Power customers were left without power, while in New Brunswick, around 19,000 NB Power customers were left without power. The storm also resulted in Confederation Bridge shutting down, as wind gusts reached 139 km/h (86 mph). Offshore waves reached heights of 16 m (52 ft).

=== Bermuda ===
On 5 January 2018, the storm was also responsible for a persistent thunderstorm that brought 1.84 inches (47 mm) of rain and gale-force winds to the island of Bermuda. There were wind gusts of up to 52 miles per hour (84 km/h; 45 kn).

=== Cruise ships ===
On 4 January 2018, both the Norwegian Breakaway and the Norwegian Gem traveled through the storm causing major flooding in passenger staterooms. The Breakaway, with 4,000 passengers, was sailing from the Bahamas back to New York City when it sustained flooding throughout the passenger cabins as well as elevators and the hallways. Some rooms were so badly flooded that some passengers slept in the public spaces. Footage of the ordeal showed the sides of the ship being hit by waves as high as 30 feet (9.1 m). At some points in the trip, the ship tilted so much that some passengers fell out of their beds. There was widespread damage to the interior as glasses fell out of shelves and some furniture toppled over. Paintings in the art gallery could be seen falling off the walls as the ship tilted due to the turbulent seas. Seasickness was widespread as guests could be seen vomiting. While Norwegian Cruise Line released a formal apology, the incident has sparked outrage with some guests were traumatized to the point of refusing to cruise again while others threatened a class action lawsuit. The ship's late arrival cut the following 14-day cruise short by one day.

== Naming ==
The storm has received several different unofficial names from different media outlets. The Weather Channel, which names significant winter storms that have disruptive impacts on major cities, assigned the name Grayson to the winter storm. Other common names associated with the system include Blizzard of 2018 as well as Storm Brody. The National Weather Service has stated though that, unlike hurricanes, it does not name winter storms. The practice of winter storm naming remains controversial in the United States.

== See also ==
- 2017–18 North American cold wave – affected the United States at the same time
- 2017–18 North American winter
- January 2–4, 2014 North American blizzard – similar system that impacted the Northeastern United States around the same time frame four years earlier
- March 2014 nor'easter – A comparably powerful storm that impacted the United States East Coast and Eastern Canada
- February 2013 North American blizzard – powerful blizzard that formed and took a track in a similar matter to the nor'easter.
- March 2017 North American blizzard – significant blizzard that impacted much of the Northeastern United States nearly a year prior
- January 2022 North American blizzard – powerful nor'easter and blizzard that impacted the Northeastern United States four years later.
- February 2026 North American blizzard - powerful blizzard that struck the Northeast and New England eight years later.
