= 2022 blizzard =

2022 blizzard may refer to:

- January 2022 North American blizzard
- Late December 2022 North American winter storm
