= CFRT =

CFRT may refer to:

- CFRT-FM, a radio station in Iqaluit, Nunavut, Canada
- Canadian Forces Radio and Television, a now-defunct radio and television service for the Canadian Armed Forces
- Cystic Fibrosis Research Trust
- Continuous Fiberglass Reinforced Thermoplastic
