= Alliance des radios communautaires du Canada =

The Alliance des radios communautaires du Canada is a Canadian organization, which serves as a coordinating body for French-language community radio stations in the regions of English Canada, where French speakers are in the minority. Founded in 1991, the organization supports the development and maintenance of French-language community radio in Canada through lobbying, advocacy, management support, training and syndication of programming.

The organization cooperates with, but operates separately from, the Association des radiodiffuseurs communautaires du Québec for community radio stations in Quebec. In 2018, the two organizations held their first-ever joint conference for all French-language community radio stations across Canada. Alongside organizations such as the Association de la presse francophone, the Quebec Community Newspapers Association and the English-Language Arts Network, it is also a partner in the Consortium of Official Language Minority Community Media, which supports the overall development of minority-language media in Canada.

In 2010, the Alliance des radios communautaires du Canada and the Association de la presse francophone selected Pascale Castonguay, the editor of the francophone newspaper Le Voyageur, as a correspondent covering the 2010 Winter Olympics for all member outlets of both organizations.

== Member stations ==
=== Alberta ===
- Edmonton — CFED-FM
- Plamondon — CHPL-FM

=== British Columbia ===
- Victoria — CILS-FM

=== Manitoba ===
- Winnipeg — CKXL-FM

=== New Brunswick ===
- Campbellton — CIMS-FM
- Dieppe — CFBO-FM
- Edmundston — CFAI-FM
- Fredericton — CJPN-FM
- Kedgwick — CFJU-FM
- Miramichi — CKMA-FM
- Moncton — CKUM-FM
- Pokemouche — CKRO-FM
- Saint John — CHQC-FM
- Shediac — CJSE-FM

=== Northwest Territories ===
- Yellowknife — CIVR-FM

=== Nova Scotia ===
- Cheticamp — CKJM-FM
- Halifax — CKRH-FM
- Petit-de-Grat — CITU-FM
- Saulnierville — CIFA-FM

=== Nunavut ===
- Iqaluit — CFRT-FM

=== Ontario ===
- Cornwall — CHOD-FM
- Hearst — CINN-FM
- Kapuskasing — CKGN-FM
- Ottawa — CJFO-FM
- Penetanguishene — CFRH-FM

=== Saskatchewan ===
- Gravelbourg — CFRG-FM
