= CJPN-FM =

Radio station in Fredericton, New Brunswick

Coordinates: 45°56′27″N 66°39′12″W

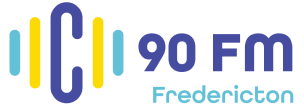
- Fredericton, New Brunswick; Canada
- Broadcast area: Greater Fredericton
- Frequency: 90.5 MHz
- Branding: C90

Programming
- Language: French
- Format: Community radio

Ownership
- Owner: C médias; (Radio Fredericton Inc.)
- Sister stations: CKMA-FM, CKRH-FM, CHQC-FM

History
- First air date: August 22, 1997
- Call sign meaning: Ça joue pour nous

Technical information
- Class: A
- ERP: 1,560 watts
- HAAT: 87 metres (285 ft)

Links
- Website: cmedias.ca

CJPN-FM is a French-language radio station in Fredericton, New Brunswick, Canada, broadcasting at 90.5 FM.

The station signed on August 22, 1997, from its studios at Le Centre Communautaire Sainte-Anne (Fredericton). It had been preceded by several pop-up stations in 1992, 1994, and 1996.

CJPN broadcasts to a population of 13,360 French speakers in Fredericton.

CJPN airs live programming from its own studios, as well as francophone music from Quebec, Acadia and other regions.

In August 2015, CJPN announced that, after following a new strategic plan, revenues had increased substantially. As part of the changes, the company developed a strategic alliance with Miramichi's CKMA-FM and Saint John's CHQC-FM.

The station is a member of the Alliance des radios communautaires du Canada.

== History ==
CJPN Radio, FM 90.5, allows Francophones in the provincial capital region to hear French music and local news. The idea of putting a community radio in place came in October 1990, when a first information meeting was organized to determine the interest of setting up a French-language radio station in Fredericton. Finally, on August 22, 1997, CJPN broadcast for the first time on the FM 90.5 frequency with a transmitter of about 2,000 watts.

Since 2015, Radio Fredericton inc. CJPN works in partnership with Francophone community radio stations in Saint-Jean, CHQC-FM and Miramichi French-language community radio station CKMA-FM. This is the first resource sharing project implemented in three independent French-language community radio stations in Canada. These three radio stations share the general management, the production department, their technician, the accounting department and some of their broadcasts.

On December 19, 2022, CJPN rebranded to C90 and is now owned by C médias. On the same day, CHQC in Saint John, CKRH in Halifax, and CKMA in Miramichi also adopted the "C" branding from C médias.
