= CITU-FM =

Canadian radio station

Coordinates: 45°33′06″N 61°04′45″W

- Petit-de-Grat, Nova Scotia; Canada
- Frequency: 104.1 MHz
- Branding: Radio Richmond

Programming
- Format: Community radio

Ownership
- Owner: La Co-opérative Radio Richmond limitée

History
- First air date: March 2010

Technical information
- Class: A
- ERP: 5,200 watts

Links
- Website: Official website

CITU-FM is a Canadian radio station which broadcasts a French language community radio format on the frequency 104.1 FM in Petit-de-Grat, Nova Scotia.

Owned by La Co-opérative Radio Richmond limitée, the station received Canadian Radio-television and Telecommunications Commission (CRTC) approval on March 15, 2006.

The station's former callsign was CIZO-FM. It was changed in 2009.

CITU-FM signed on the air in 2010. Its studios and offices were at 3435 Route 206, and the transmitter was on top of a former dump in Isle Madame, Nova Scotia.

The station is a member of the Alliance des radios communautaires du Canada.
