= CFJU-FM =

Radio station in New Brunswick, Canada

- Kedgwick, New Brunswick; Canada
- Frequency: 90.1 MHz
- Branding: Route 17 FM 90.1

Programming
- Language: French
- Format: Community radio

Ownership
- Owner: La Radio Communautaire des Hauts Plateau

History
- First air date: 1991

Technical information
- Licensing authority: CRTC
- ERP: 3 kWs
- HAAT: 88.5 metres (290 ft)
- Transmitter coordinates: 47°35′05″N 67°21′45″W

Links
- Website: www.route17.ca

CFJU-FM is a Canadian radio station, broadcasting at 90.1 FM in Kedgwick, New Brunswick. The station broadcasts a French-language community radio format.

The station was originally launched in 1991 as a rebroadcaster of CFAI in Edmundston. Although the station still rebroadcasts some programming from CFAI, it began airing locally produced programming in 1993.

In April 2016, CFJU changed its branding from FM 90 to Route 17 FM 90.1.

== Notes ==
The station is a member of the Alliance des radios communautaires du Canada.
