= CIVR-FM =

Radio station in Yellowknife, Northwest Territories

- Yellowknife, Northwest Territories; Canada
- Frequency: 103.5 MHz
- Branding: Radio Taïga

Programming
- Language: French
- Format: Community radio

Ownership
- Owner: Médias Ténois

History
- First air date: September 14, 2001

Technical information
- Licensing authority: CRTC
- ERP: 164 watts
- HAAT: 46.9 metres (154 ft)
- Transmitter coordinates: 62°26′50″N 114°21′37″W

Links
- Webcast: Listen live
- Website: radiotaiga.com

CIVR-FM is a Canadian radio station, broadcasting at 103.5 FM in Yellowknife, Northwest Territories. Branded as Radio Taïga, the station airs a community radio format for Yellowknife's Franco-Ténois community.

The station is a member of the Alliance des radios communautaires du Canada.

== History ==
On April 28, 2000, L'Association Franco-culturelle de Yellowknife received CRTC approval to operate a new French-language community radio station at Yellowknife. The station would broadcast on a frequency of 93.3 MHz, with an effective radiated power of 164 watts. 126 hours of programming per week would be broadcast, of which 15 hours would be produced locally, with the balance of the programming originating with the French-language radio network Réseau Francophone D'Amérique. The licence would be held by a not-for-profit organization.

Still unbuilt, on April 5, 2001, CIVR-FM received approval from the CRTC to change frequencies from 93.3 to 103.5 MHz. Two weeks later, the CRTC granted it an extension of its construction period, and the station signed on September 14, 2001.

On June 9, 2011, Société Radio Taïga received CRTC approval to acquire CIVR-FM from L'Association Franco-Culturelle de Yellowknife. Upon surrender of the current licence issued to L'Association Franco-Culturelle de Yellowknife, the Commission would issue a new licence to Société Radio Taïga, to expire August 31, 2013. Furthermore, the Commission's analysis revealed that, during the current licence term, CIVR-FM might have contravened section 9(2) of the Radio Regulations, 1986 regarding the submission of annual returns for the 2005-2006 and 2009-2010 broadcast years. In a letter dated February 10, 2011, the applicant indicated that, once the acquisition of assets was complete, it would pursue the matter so that it could submit the missing annual returns to the Commission by the end of March 2012. The Commission stated it would review CIVR-FM's compliance with its regulatory obligations, including any instances of non-compliance, in the context of the station's licence renewal in 2013.

In 2021, the station owner merged with the Yellowknife-based francophone newspaper L'Aquilon. The merger brought both outlets under the management of a new organization, Médias Ténois.

== See also ==
- VF2136
