= Chéticamp, Nova Scotia =

Chéticamp
- Unincorporated town
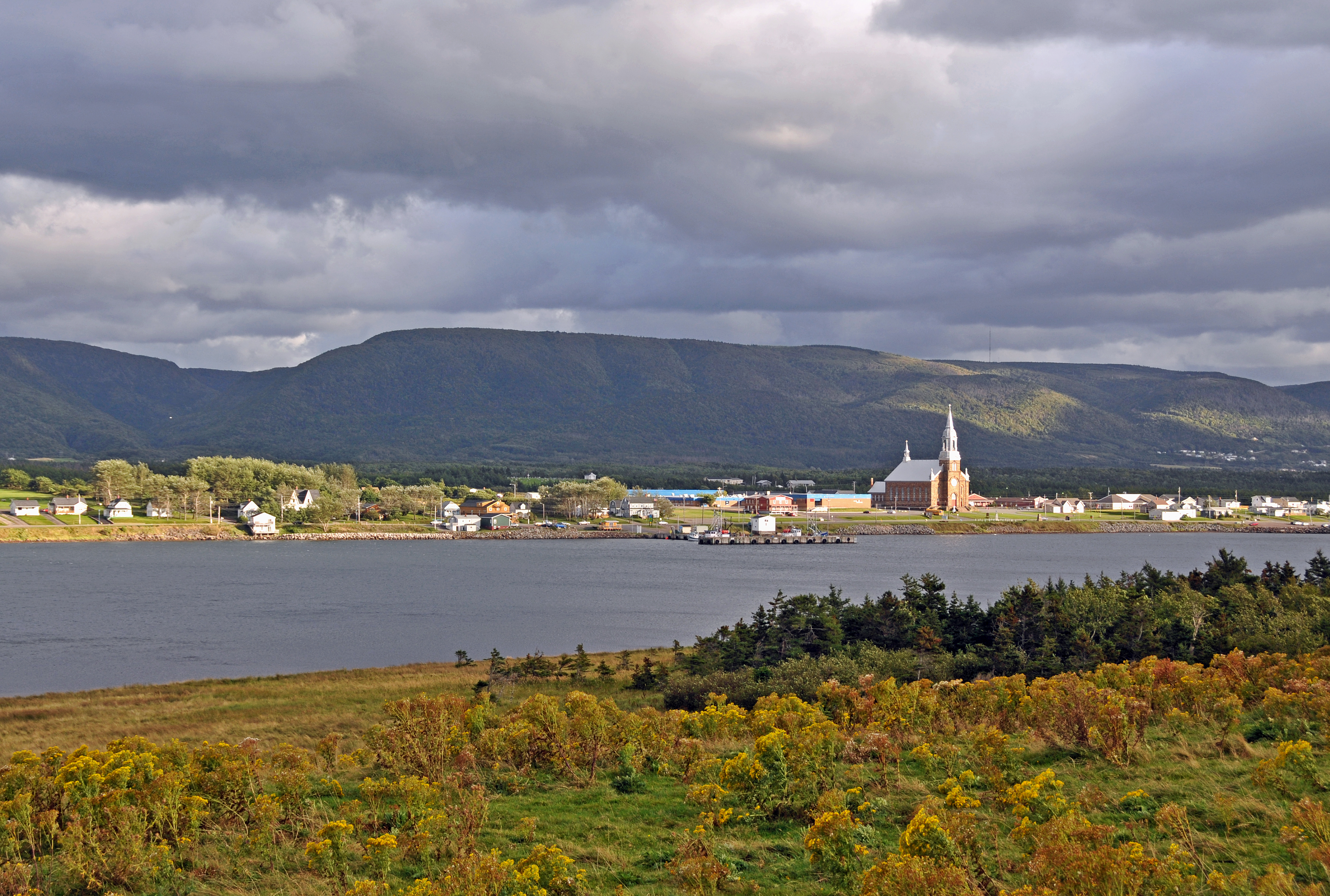
- Interactive map of Chéticamp
- Coordinates: 46°38′16.39″N 61°0′32.9″W
- Country: Canada
- Province: Nova Scotia
- Municipality: Municipality of the County of Inverness
- Established: 1785

Government
  - Type: Village
  - MP: Jaime Battiste (Cape Breton-Canso-Antigonish)
  - MLA: Kyle MacQuarrie (Inverness)

Area
  - Land: 98.67 km^{2} (38.10 sq mi)

Population (2006)
  - Total: 3,039
  - Density: 30.8/km^{2} (80/sq mi)
- Time zone: UTC−4 (AST)
  - Summer (DST): UTC−3 (ADT)
- Postal code span: B0E
- Area code: 902
- Website: www.cheticamp.ca

Chéticamp is an unincorporated town on the Cabot Trail on the west coast of Cape Breton Island in Nova Scotia, Canada. It is a local service centre. A majority of the population are Acadians. Together with its smaller neighbour, Saint-Joseph-du-Moine, Chéticamp makes up the largest Francophone enclave on Cape Breton Island. The 2006 population was 3,039 people.

== Etymology ==
The name "Chéticamp" derives from the name given by the Mi'kmaq First Nations, who still live on Cape Breton Island (but not in Chéticamp). The name is Awjátúj (Francis-Smith orthography) in Mi’kmaq, meaning "rarely full", presumably making reference to the mouth of Chéticamp harbour that once had a large dune that grew during low tide.

The French spelling of the town's name went through several variations including Ochatisia (1660), Ochatis (1689), "Chetecqan" (1689 Pierre Detcheverry map of the Gulf of St Lawrence for Governor Antoine Parat) Chétican, Chéticamps (1725) and Chétifcamp (1803). The current spelling appeared for the first time on 3 May 1815, in the writings of the missionary Antoine Manseau. In French, the name has been pronounced successively Le Chady, Le Grand Chady, Le Chady Grand, Île de Chedegan and finally, the current version, Chatican (IPA: [ʃatikɑ̃]). Chéticamp is usually pronounced phonetically in French outside of the area.

The name does not always take the acute accent on the e in English (i.e., "Cheticamp").

A village in western Nova Scotia, Saint Alphonse de Clare, was originally called Chéticamp de Clare. Its name was changed to avoid confusion for postal delivery.

== History ==
Chéticamp was a fishing station used during the summer months by Charles Robin, a merchant from the island of Jersey, and is considered one of the Acadian capitals of the world. In the years following the Great Expulsion, many Acadians came to this area. The first permanent settlers following that era were the families of Pierre Bois and Joseph Richard, who arrived in 1782, although both brothers John and Paul Chiasson along with many other French settlers like the AuCoin family were believed to have predated Bois, Richard and Robin by over 100 years. Chiasson is looked at today as the oldest family name on record in the town. Many of the original family names still reside in and around the small town. They, like all the original founding family names of Chéticamp, can be found chiseled in stone in the town still to this day. Settlement was formally established in 1785 by a grant of land to the 14 original settlers. Today Chéticamp, which is at the entrance of the Cape Breton Highlands National Park, is a popular tourist spot.

== Geography ==
Topographic map of the Chéticamp area

Chéticamp is at the western entrance to Cape Breton Highlands National Park which contains the Acadian Trail. The downtown area overlooks a harbour that is protected from the Gulf of Saint Lawrence by Chéticamp Island. The Chéticamp River flows into the Gulf of St. Lawrence approximately 5 km northeast of the village.

=== Climate ===
Chéticamp experiences a humid continental climate (Dfb). Temperature and precipitation patterns are greatly influenced by the Gulf of Saint Lawrence and Cape Breton Highlands. The highest temperature ever recorded in Chéticamp was 33.3 °C (92 °F) on 10 August 2001. The coldest temperature ever recorded was −29.5 °C (−21.1 °F) on 27 January 1994.

Climate data for Chéticamp, 1991–2020 normals, extremes 1935–present
Month	Jan	Feb	Mar	Apr	May	Jun	Jul	Aug	Sep	Oct	Nov	Dec	Year
Record high °C (°F)	18.9 (66.0)	19.0 (66.2)	20.3 (68.5)	25.1 (77.2)	29.5 (85.1)	31.7 (89.1)	32.0 (89.6)	33.3 (91.9)	30.0 (86.0)	28.0 (82.4)	23.4 (74.1)	19.2 (66.6)	33.3 (91.9)
Mean daily maximum °C (°F)	−0.3 (31.5)	−0.8 (30.6)	2.6 (36.7)	7.6 (45.7)	14.0 (57.2)	19.4 (66.9)	23.6 (74.5)	23.3 (73.9)	19.4 (66.9)	13.5 (56.3)	8.4 (47.1)	3.2 (37.8)	11.2 (52.2)
Daily mean °C (°F)	−4.0 (24.8)	−5.1 (22.8)	−1.7 (28.9)	3.4 (38.1)	9.0 (48.2)	14.4 (57.9)	18.8 (65.8)	18.7 (65.7)	15.0 (59.0)	9.7 (49.5)	5.0 (41.0)	0.2 (32.4)	6.9 (44.4)
Mean daily minimum °C (°F)	−7.7 (18.1)	−9.4 (15.1)	−6.0 (21.2)	−0.9 (30.4)	4.0 (39.2)	9.3 (48.7)	14.0 (57.2)	14.1 (57.4)	10.5 (50.9)	5.8 (42.4)	1.6 (34.9)	−3.0 (26.6)	2.7 (36.9)
Record low °C (°F)	−29.5 (−21.1)	−29.0 (−20.2)	−27.8 (−18.0)	−14.0 (6.8)	−6.7 (19.9)	−1.8 (28.8)	3.5 (38.3)	1.1 (34.0)	−1.1 (30.0)	−6.0 (21.2)	−16.0 (3.2)	−19.5 (−3.1)	−29.5 (−21.1)
Average precipitation mm (inches)	113.3 (4.46)	101.2 (3.98)	92.9 (3.66)	88.4 (3.48)	82.3 (3.24)	88.3 (3.48)	92.7 (3.65)	102.5 (4.04)	127.1 (5.00)	136.2 (5.36)	134.7 (5.30)	143.8 (5.66)	1,303.4 (51.31)
Average rainfall mm (inches)	61.3 (2.41)	40.1 (1.58)	52.2 (2.06)	66.4 (2.61)	83.3 (3.28)	96.4 (3.80)	90.0 (3.54)	114.4 (4.50)	124.1 (4.89)	129.1 (5.08)	121.3 (4.78)	84.6 (3.33)	1,063 (41.85)
Average snowfall cm (inches)	81.6 (32.1)	67.7 (26.7)	51.1 (20.1)	21.7 (8.5)	2.0 (0.8)	0.0 (0.0)	0.0 (0.0)	0.0 (0.0)	0.0 (0.0)	0.7 (0.3)	19.3 (7.6)	68.0 (26.8)	312.0 (122.8)
Average precipitation days (≥ 0.2 mm)	21.2	16.8	17.5	15.6	16.2	14.4	15.0	14.4	16.4	19.9	20.4	22.4	210.1
Average rainy days (≥ 0.2 mm)	6.4	4.6	6.8	10.9	15.3	14.7	14.6	14.4	16.8	18.7	17.2	10.1	150.2
Average snowy days (≥ 0.2 cm)	17.4	12.6	10.4	3.2	0.39	0.0	0.0	0.0	0.0	0.18	4.8	14.7	63.6
Source: Environment Canada (rain, snow 1981–2010)

== Economy ==
Apart from an important gypsum mine which operated off and on until the Second World War, the main industry in Chéticamp historically has been fishing. As ground fish quotas have declined, tourism has taken on more importance and is one of the two largest industries at this time along with the shellfish fisheries, lobster and crab.

The tourism industry is based on culture and the scenery found in the coastal village at the entrance of Cape Breton's national park. Chéticamp has also marketed its traditional rug hookers ("tapis hookers"), Acadian music and food. Activities for visitors include whale watching, hiking, swimming, cross country skiing, golfing, snowmobiling, cultural events and festivals and photography. They also host an International Dance Festival, and La fête nationale de l'Acadie (August 15).

== Tourist attractions ==
The local beach named St. Peter's Beach allows swimming, camping, and other recreational activities.

The Northern Inverness Recreational Association also manages the local golf course, Le Portage, which is considered part of "Cape Breton's Fabulous Foursome".

Chéticamp extends for four kilometres along the Cabot Trail. One kilometre northeast is Petit Étang, then further east is La Prairie. South of La Prairie is Le Platin and Belle-Marche. Even further south is Pointe-à-la-Croix (Point Cross). From Main street Chéticamp, you can view the typical Chéticamp houses. Saint Peter's Church is unique and rich in Acadian history.

The Université Sainte-Anne has a campus in Saint-Joseph-du-Moine.

== Gallery ==
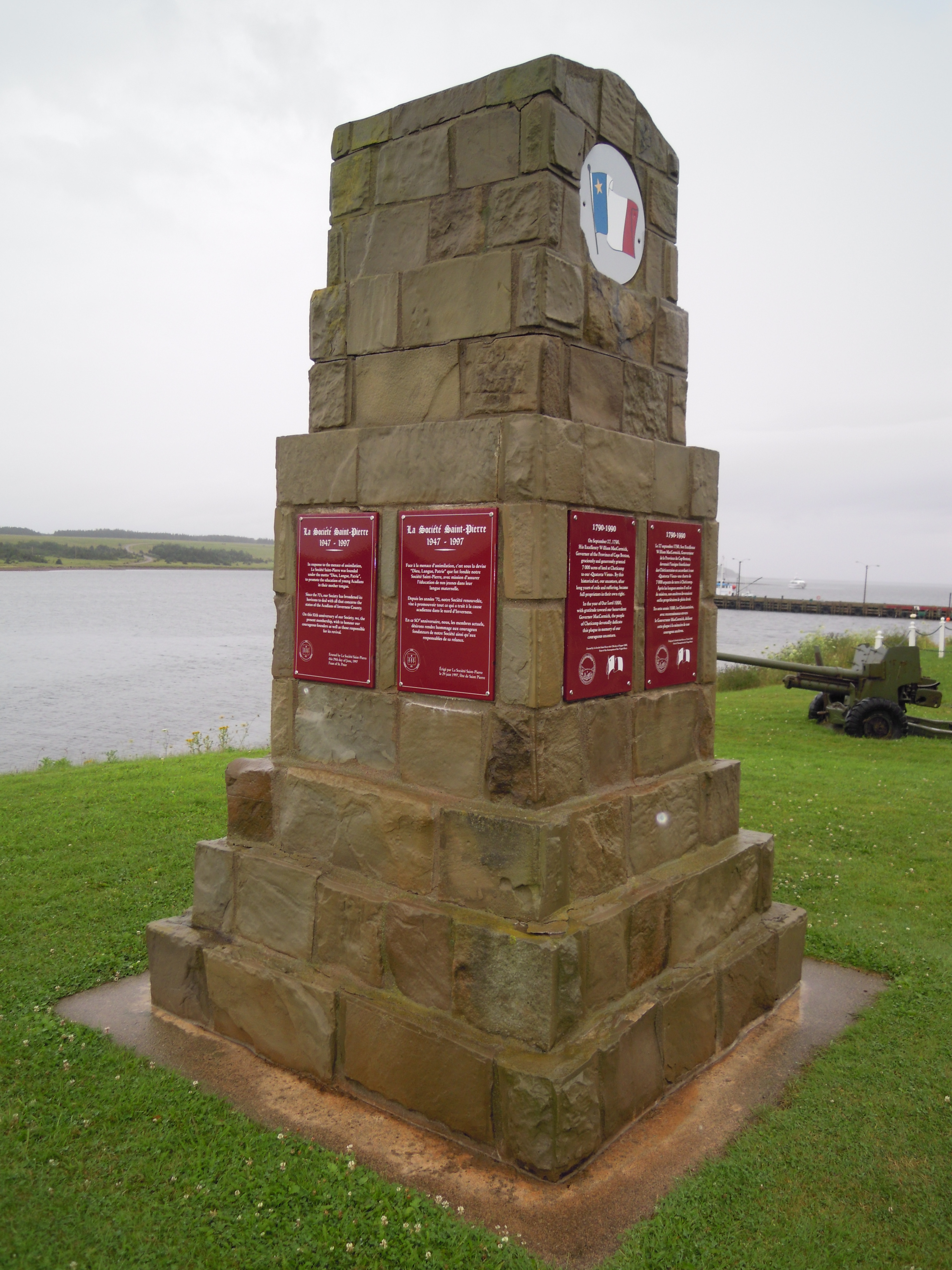
Acadian Monument to their Return (1790)

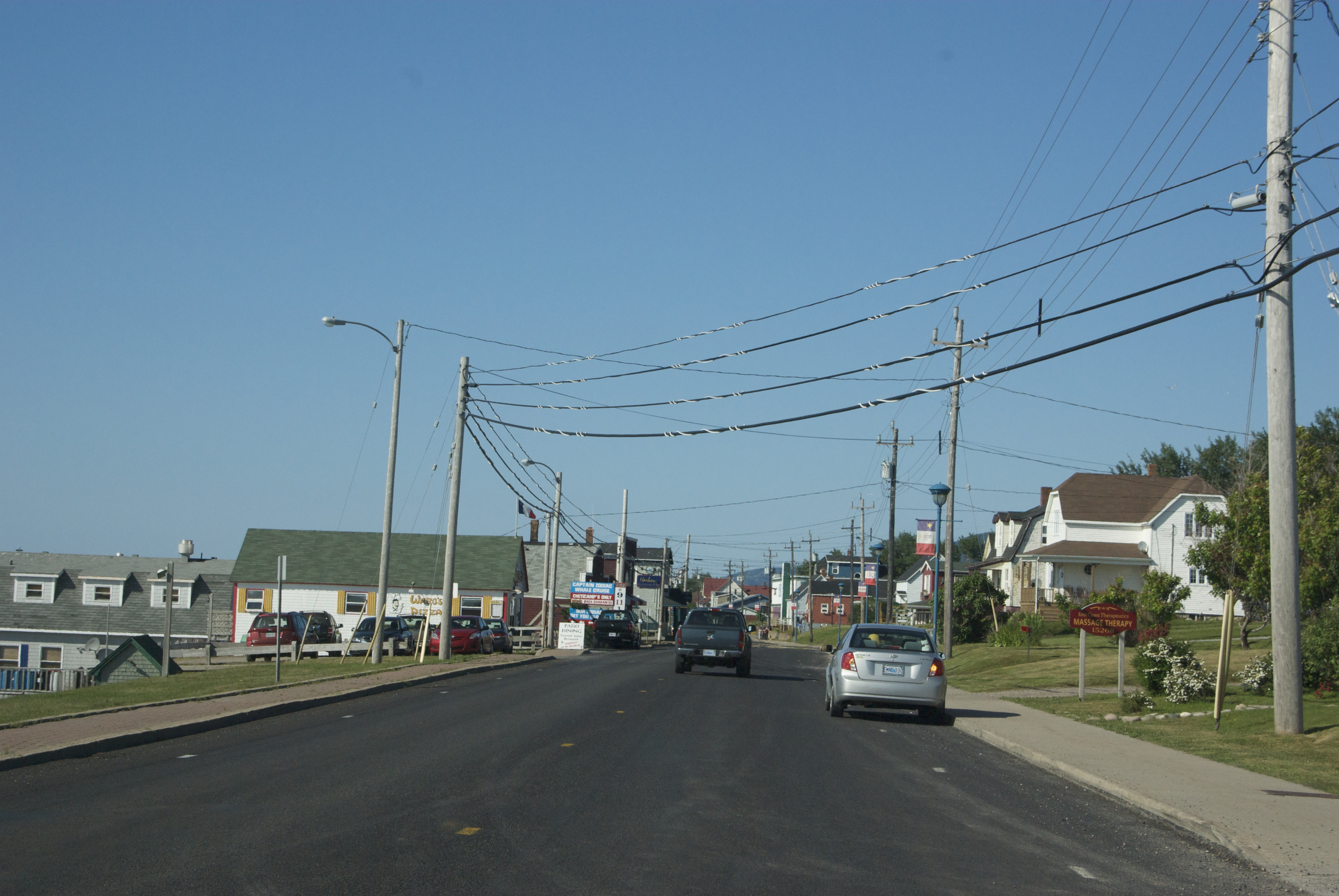
Main street in Chéticamp.

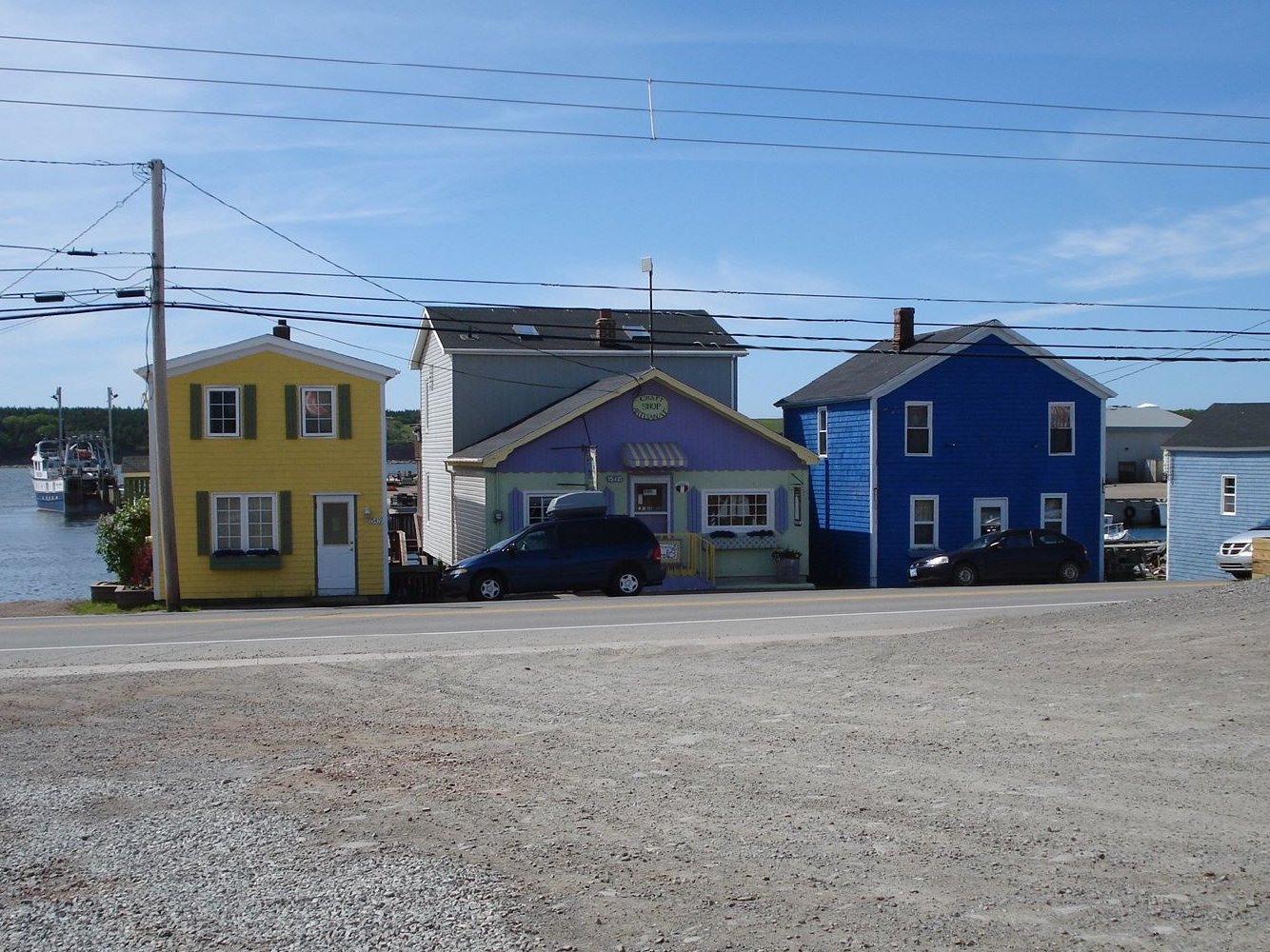
Houses in Chéticamp.

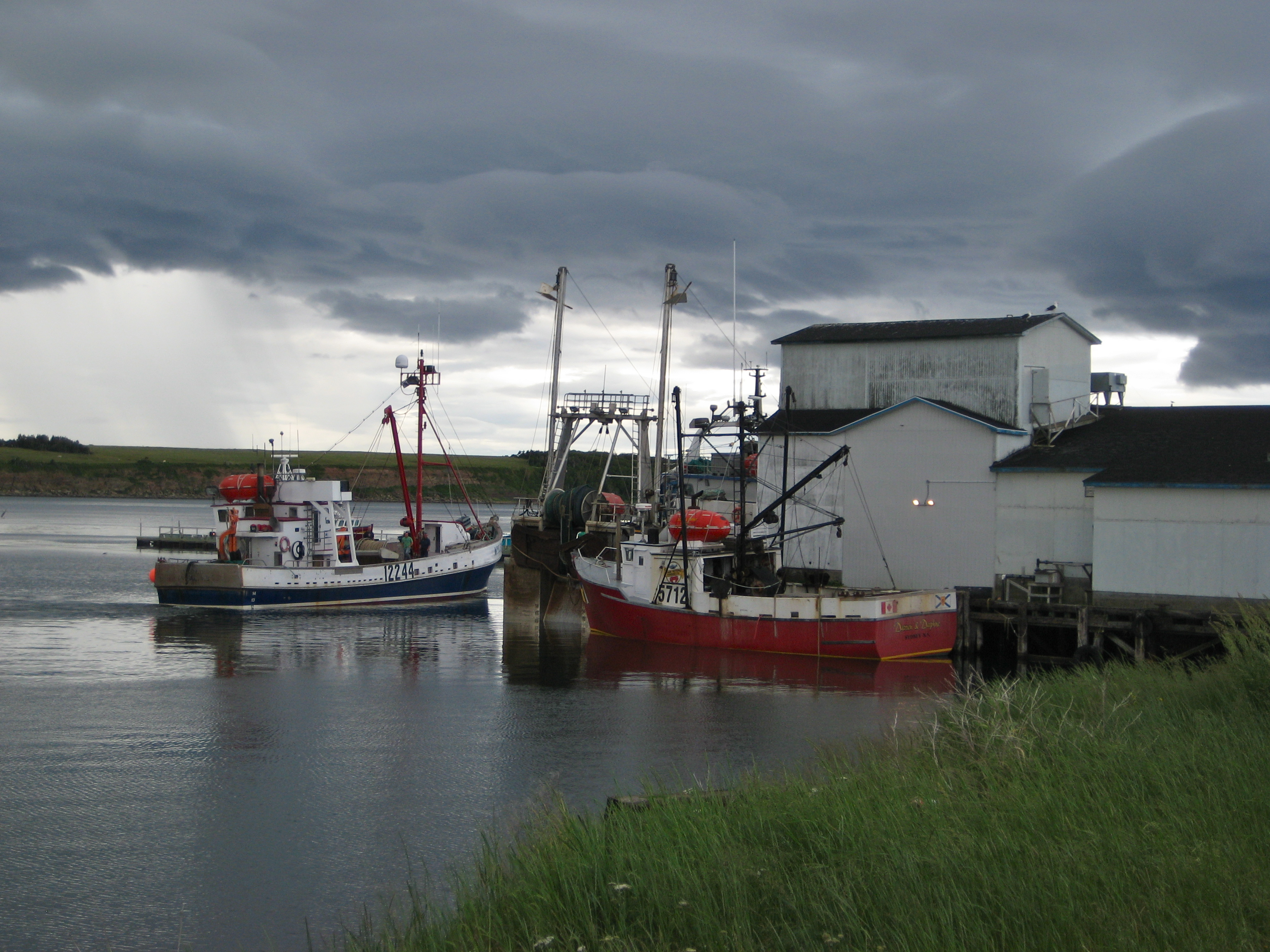
Fishing boats at Chéticamp.

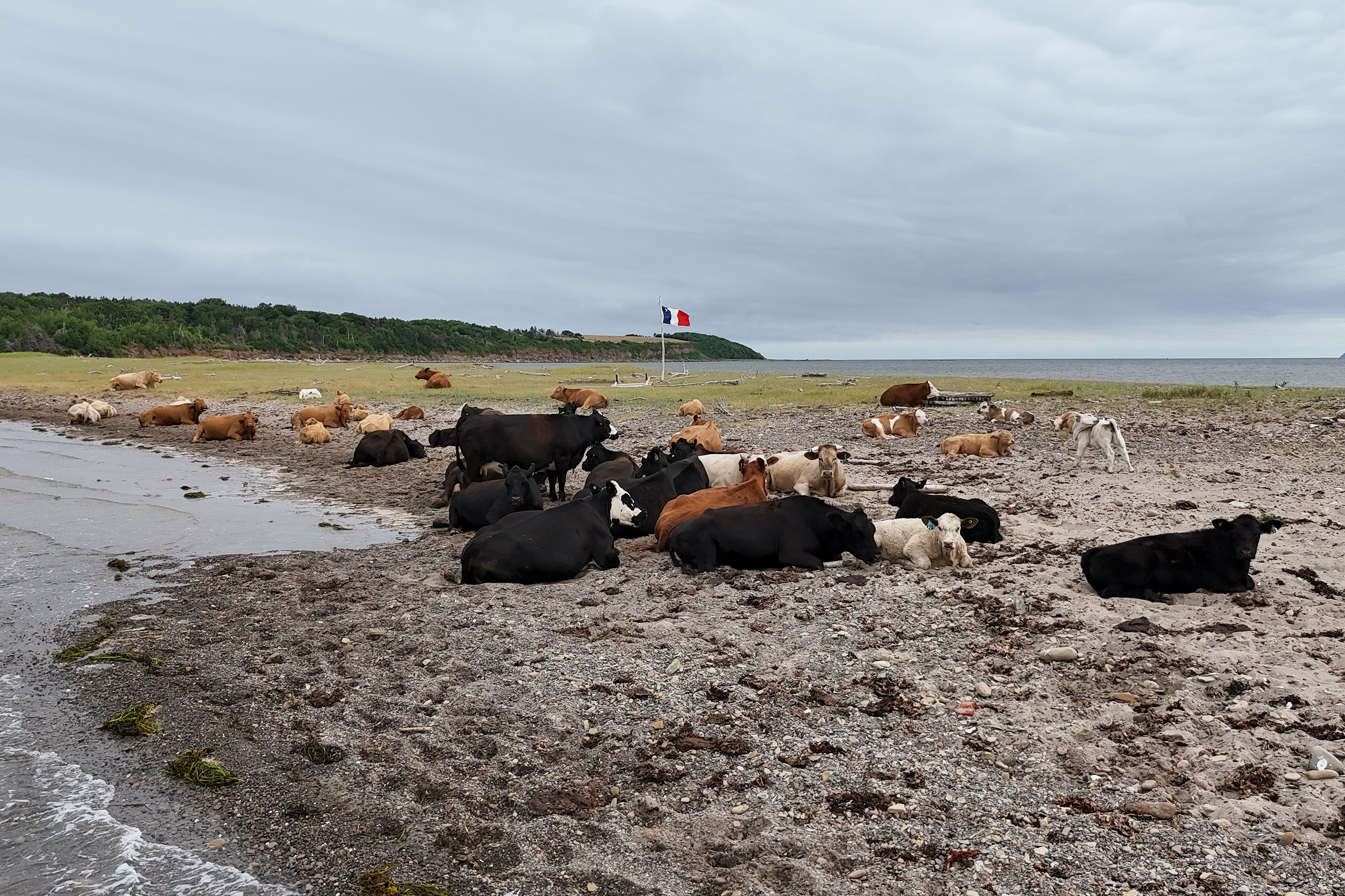
Cows on Chéticamp Island
