= CIFA-FM =

Francophone community radio station in Clare, Nova Scotia

Coordinates: 43°55′55″N 66°06′08″W

- Comeauville (Clare), Nova Scotia; Canada
- Frequency: 104.1 MHz

Programming
- Language: French
- Format: Community radio

History
- First air date: September 28, 1990

Technical information
- ERP: 39,300 watts
- HAAT: 145.5 metres

Links
- Website: cifafm.com

CIFA-FM is a Canadian radio station, broadcasting at 104.1 FM in Clare, Nova Scotia. It is a francophone community radio station for the region's Acadian community.

Owned by l'association Radio Clare, the station received CRTC approval in 1989. In 1987, Radio Clare also received approval to broadcast informational programs in Church Point for participants and visitors in the summer and fall of 1987, such as: "Festival Acadien de Clare", "Festival de musique de Clare", "Expo-Commerce" and "La Fête de l'action de grâce". The station for these events operated at 102.1 MHz.

The shows on CIFA vary from bluegrass, Acadian, classic rock, country and heavy metal.

The station is a member of the Alliance des radios communautaires du Canada.
