= CKRH-FM =

Radio station in Halifax, Nova Scotia

- Halifax, Nova Scotia; Canada
- Frequency: 98.5 MHz
- Branding: C98

Programming
- Language: French
- Format: Variety

Ownership
- Owner: C médias
- Sister stations: CKMA-FM, CJPN-FM, CHQC-FM

History
- First air date: 2006 (approval)
- Call sign meaning: Radio Halifax Metro (former branding)

Technical information
- Class: B1
- ERP: horizontal polarization only: 1.85 kW
- HAAT: 224.1 metres (735 ft)

Links
- Website: cmedias.ca

CKRH-FM is a Canadian radio station, broadcasting at 98.5 MHz in Halifax, Nova Scotia. The station broadcasts a French language community radio format for the city's Acadian and francophone communities.

Currently owned by C médias, the station received CRTC approval in 2006.

The station is a member of the Alliance des radios communautaires du Canada.

In June 2016, CKRH-FM rebranded from Radio Halifax to Oui 98.

On December 19, 2022, CKRH rebranded to C98 and is now owned by C médias. On the same day, CJPN in Fredericton, CHQC in Saint John, and CKMA in Miramichi also adopted the "C" branding from C médias.
