= CKXL-FM =

Francophone community radio station in Saint Boniface, Manitoba

- Saint Boniface, Winnipeg, Manitoba; Canada
- Broadcast area: Winnipeg Metropolitan Region
- Frequency: 91.1 MHz
- Branding: Envol 91 FM

Programming
- Format: French-language community radio

Ownership
- Owner: La Radio Communautaire du Manitoba Inc.

History
- First air date: June 24, 1989
- Former frequencies: 101.5 MHz (1989–1991)

Technical information
- Class: C1
- ERP: 61,000 watts
- HAAT: 223 metres (732 ft)
- Transmitter coordinates: 49°46′15″N 97°30′37″W

Links
- Webcast: Listen Live
- Website: envol91.mb.ca

CKXL-FM (91.1 MHz) is a French-language community radio station licensed to Saint Boniface, Winnipeg, Manitoba, Canada and serving the Winnipeg Capital Region. It broadcasts a public radio format that has 80% Manitoba content. It uses the branding Envol 91 FM.

CKXL-FM is owned by La Radio Communautaire du Manitoba Inc. It broadcasts from the Franco-Manitoban Cultural Centre (CCFM) in the Winnipeg district of Saint Boniface. The station's transmitter is located on Provincial Trunk Highway 2 in Springstein, Manitoba.

== History ==
CKXL first signed on the air on June 24, 1989. It originally broadcast on the 101.5 FM frequency, with a temporary licence granted to La Radio Communautaire du Manitoba by the Canadian Radio-television and Telecommunications Commission (CRTC). CKXL owned a mobile broadcast unit which traveled throughout the French communities of Manitoba during the summer of 1989. The mobile unit had a low power transmitter with an eight-mile coverage area. During this trial run, Winnipeggers were able to listen to CKXL on June 30, July 1 and during Folklorama '89.

CKXL received a permanent licence from the CRTC and moved to 91.1 FM on October 21, 1991. CKXL broadcasts at 61,000 watts from the Starbuck Communications Tower.

Noted writer Laurent Poliquin has been a host on the station since 2002. CKXL is a member of the Alliance des radios communautaires du Canada.

In June 2006 CKXL-FM was authorized by the CRTC to decrease its amount of station-produced programming.
