= CKMA-FM =

Radio station in Miramichi, New Brunswick

- Miramichi, New Brunswick; Canada
- Broadcast area: Miramichi Valley
- Frequency: 93.7 MHz
- Branding: C93

Programming
- Language: French
- Format: Variety

Ownership
- Owner: C médias
- Sister stations: CJPN-FM, CKRH-FM, CHQC-FM

History
- First air date: 2003 (testing)

Technical information
- Class: B1
- ERP: 11,000 watts
- HAAT: 47.5 m

Links
- Website: cmedias.ca

CKMA-FM is a Canadian radio station, broadcasting at 93.7 FM in Miramichi, New Brunswick. Currently owned by C médias, the station broadcasts a French-language community radio format for the region's Acadian community.

On June 14, 2010, CKMA-FM applied to the CRTC to add a transmitter at Neguac, New Brunswick to operate on 102.9 MHz which received approval on August 6, 2010. Neguac's repeater callsign is CKMA-FM-1.

The station is a member of the Alliance des radios communautaires du Canada.

On December 19, 2022, CKMA rebranded to C93 and is now owned by C médias. On the same day, CJPN in Fredericton, CHQC in Saint John, and CKRH in Halifax also adopted the "C" branding from C médias.
