= CHQC-FM =

Radio station in New Brunswick, Canada

- Saint John, New Brunswick; Canada
- Frequency: 105.7 MHz
- Branding: C105

Programming
- Language: French
- Format: Community radio

Ownership
- Owner: C médias
- Sister stations: CKMA-FM, CKRH-FM, CJPN-FM

History
- First air date: March 26, 2006

Technical information
- ERP: 1,850 watts
- HAAT: 39.6 metres (130 ft)

Links
- Website: cmedias.ca

CHQC-FM is a French language FM community radio station which broadcasts at 105.7 MHz in Saint John, New Brunswick, Canada. It is currently owned by C médias.

Approved by the Canadian Radio-television and Telecommunications Commission (CRTC) in 2004, the station, which launched in 2006, airs a community radio format with programming devoted to a variety of musical genres. The station is a member of the Alliance des radios communautaires du Canada.

The station's studios are located at the city's Centre Scolaire Communautaire Samuel-de-Champlain. CHQC-FM is the community radio for around 11,060 French speakers in Saint John.

== History ==
The idea of a community radio project began around 1986. This year, radio workshops were opened to the public with the help of the Government of Quebec and the Fédération de la jeunesse canadienne-française. Subsequently, members of the Regional Association of the Francophone Community (ARCf) of Saint-Jean (called Samuel-de-Champlain Community Council at the time) started a daily French radio program with the campus-community radio of the Saint-John campus of the University of New Brunswick. However, the project manager left his post in 1987 and the project was abandoned. The project started again in March 1991 as a student radio.

In 1999, the radio committee began to really grow the project with in-depth studies on the feasibility of the project. Daily French-language radio broadcasts were resumed on the student radio at the University of New Brunswick. In the following years, various groups were created to deal with the project and in January 2003, the Baie-de-la-Bise Co-operative was created. The co-op lobbied the government for funding to study to justify the project. They all demonstrated that it was realistic to create this new French-language media outlet in Saint-Jean. The radio obtained a broadcasting licence from CRTC the 26 Novembre 2004. The co-op had several fundraisers until the radio was broadcast on March 26, 2006.

Since 2015, La Brise de la Baie ltée CHQC works in partnership with Francophone community radio stations in Fredericton, CJPN-FM and Miramichi, CKMA-FM. This is the first resource sharing project implemented in three independent French-language community radio stations in Canada. These three radio stations share the general management, the production department, their technician, the accounting department and some of their broadcasts.

On December 19, 2022, CHQC rebranded to C105 and is now owned by C médias. On the same day, CJPN in Fredericton, CKRH in Halifax, and CKMA in Miramichi also adopted the "C" branding from C médias.
