= January 2022 North American blizzard =

North American blizzard in 2022

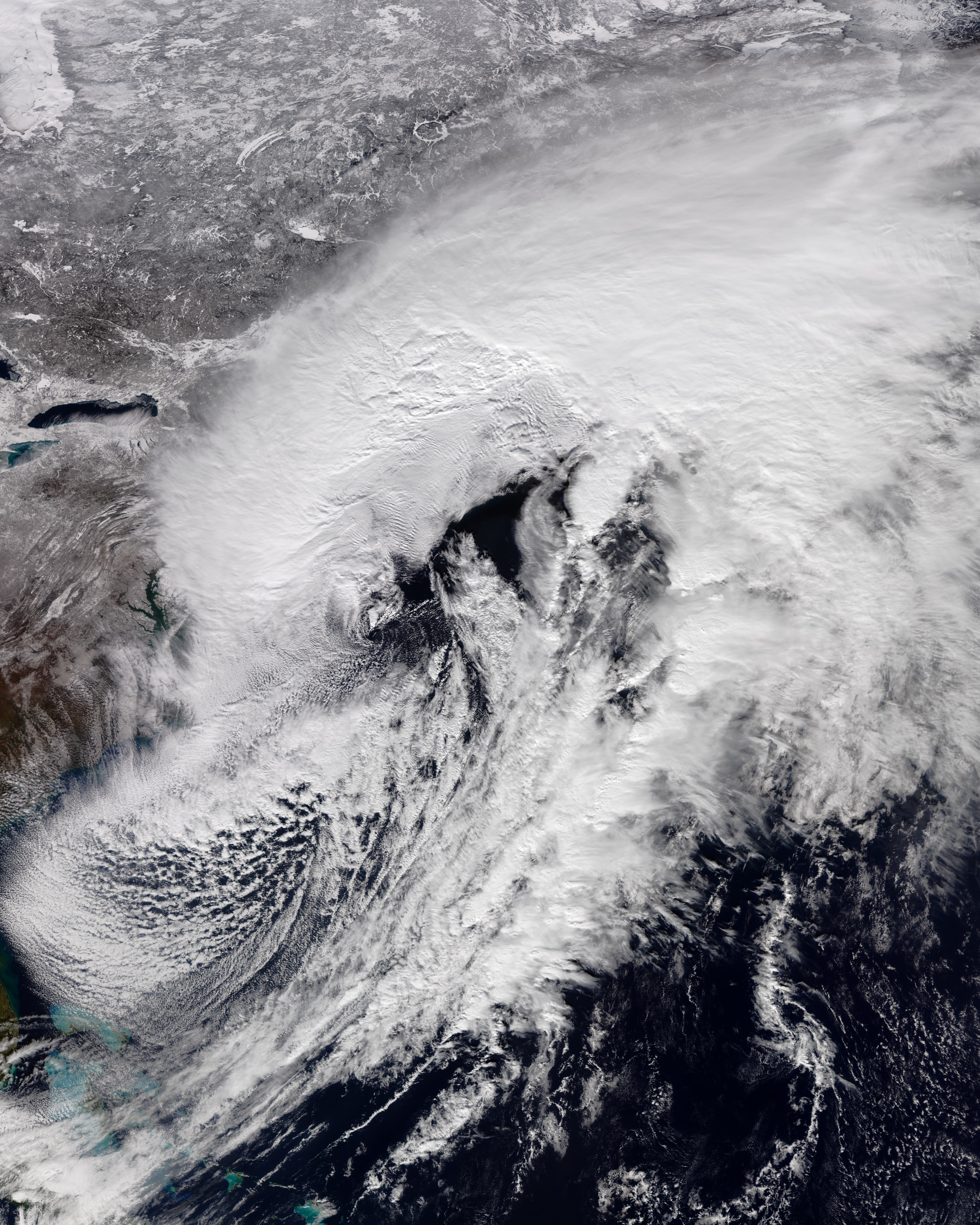
- NOAA-20 imagery of the blizzard near peak intensity off the coast of New England at 17:21 UTC (12:21 p.m. EST) on January 29, 2022

Meteorological history
- Formed: January 27, 2022
- Exited land: January 30, 2022
- Dissipated: January 31, 2022

Category 1 "Notable" blizzard
- Regional snowfall index: 2.29 (NOAA)
- Highest winds: 75 mph (120 km/h) (1-minute sustained winds)
- Highest gusts: 99 mph (159 km/h) in Truro, Massachusetts
- Lowest pressure: 969 mbar (hPa); 28.61 inHg
- Max. snowfall: 35.7 in (91 cm) near Bridgewater, Massachusetts

Overall effects
- Fatalities: 2 direct, 2 indirect
- Damage: $50 million (2022 USD)
- Areas affected: Northeastern United States, New England, Maritime Provinces of Canada
- Power outages: 130,000
- Part of the 2021–22 North American winter

From January 28–29, 2022, a significant and disruptive blizzard, unofficially referred to as Winter Storm Kenan by the Weather Channel and various media outlets, or more commonly as the Blizzard of 2022, caused widespread and disruptive impacts to the Atlantic coast of North America from northern Delaware to Nova Scotia with as much as 2.5 feet (30 in) of snowfall, blizzard conditions and coastal flooding. Forming from the energy of a strong mid- to upper-level trough, the system developed into a low-pressure area off the Southeast United States on January 28. The system then quickly intensified that night as it traveled northeast parallel to the coast on January 29, bringing heavy snowfall blown by high winds to the upper East Coast of the continent. Further north, it also moved inland in Maine and its width meant it strongly impacted all three of Canada's Maritime provinces. In some areas, mainly the coastal regions due to the wind (not the snow), areas of New Jersey, Long Island and Massachusetts, it was the first blizzard since a storm in January 2018. The storm was considered a "bomb cyclone" as it rapidly intensified and barometric pressure dropped at least 24 millibars over a 24-hour period.

Several states in the Mid-Atlantic area and New England declared states of emergency ahead of the storm as it developed. In most areas, some transportation services, such as rail, buses, ferries and highway bridges, were closed or postponed, including thousands of flights being cancelled. Strong winds created snow drifts as high as 3 feet in some areas of South Jersey. Road conditions were dangerous in all areas with many roads unable to be traveled on due to the depth of snow. Strong wind gusts as high as 99 mph (159 km/h) knocked out power to over 130,000 residents in the affected regions. At least 4 people died as a result of the blizzard, all on Long Island, with two occurring indirectly from shoveling snow. The impact of the storm was reduced because it occurred on Friday night and Saturday when schools were closed and few people were commuting. The blizzard caused at least $50 million in damages.

== Meteorological history ==
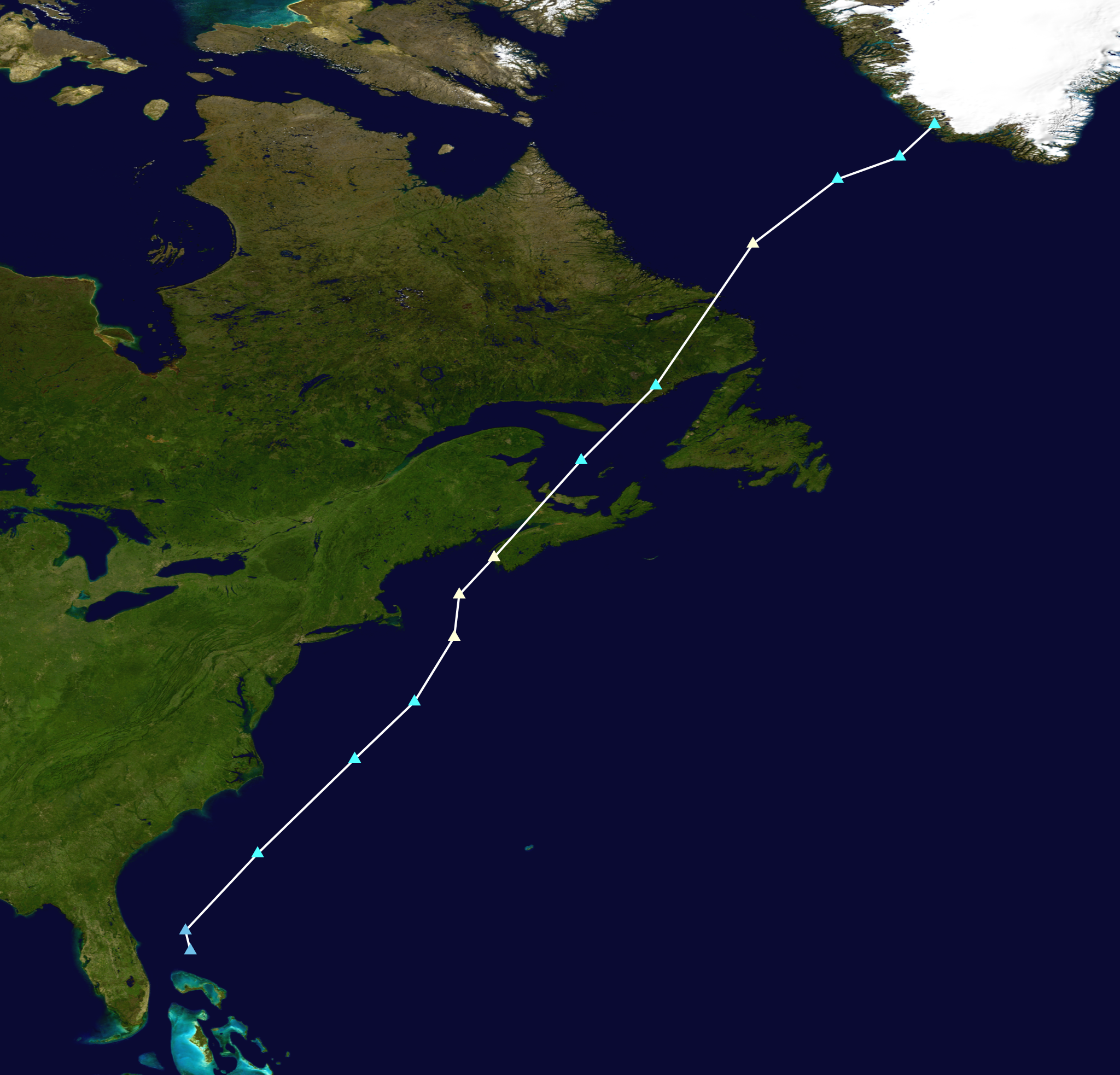
Map plotting the storm's track and intensity, according to the Saffir–Simpson scale Map key Saffir–Simpson scale Tropical depression (≤38 mph, ≤62 km/h) Tropical storm (39–73 mph, 63–118 km/h) Category 1 (74–95 mph, 119–153 km/h) Category 2 (96–110 mph, 154–177 km/h) Category 3 (111–129 mph, 178–208 km/h) Category 4 (130–156 mph, 209–251 km/h) Category 5 (≥157 mph, ≥252 km/h) Unknown Storm type Tropical cyclone Subtropical cyclone Extratropical cyclone, remnant low, tropical disturbance, or monsoon depression

Beginning in mid-to-late January 2022, computer models began to suggest the potential for a powerful storm to form in the western Atlantic Ocean at the end of the month – although the exact track was uncertain and thus snowfall estimates were not in agreement. By January 25, models such as the GFS and the European model (ECMWF) indicated the storm would track closer and stronger to the coast.

A deep upper-level trough ejected from the High Plains and Rocky Mountains on January 27 and moved eastwards towards the Atlantic. As the trough began to tilt negative, the Weather Prediction Center (WPC) reported that a surface low-pressure area had developed off the Southeast coast near Florida on January 28 as a result of the upper-level interactions. The system began intensifying as it moved north as snow and wintry precipitation blossomed over the Mid-Atlantic states later that night as a result. Rapid deepening began due to favorable conditions aloft – with the pressure dropping from 1,001 mb (29.6 inHg) at 00:00 UTC on January 29 to 972 mb (28.7 inHg) at 18:00 UTC later that day, a 29 mb (0.86 inHg) drop in only 18 hours, more than enough to meet the required criteria. The cyclone also attained hurricane-force winds around this time as well.

The WPC began issuing storm summary bulletins on the powerful system at 15:00 UTC as mesoscale banding features developed and pivoted northwest towards the coastal regions of Long Island, New England and parts of New Jersey, producing near-blizzard to actual blizzard conditions in areas. Following its quick intensification, the storm thereafter only slowly intensified until it reached its peak intensity with a minimum pressure of 969 mb (28.6 inHg) at 03:00 UTC early on January 30. By this time, snow and wind was gradually winding down along New England except closest to the shoreline, ending soon after. Throughout the day of January 30, the low quickly moved northeastwards and weakened as it moved into Nova Scotia and eastern Canada, leading to the WPC to terminate summary bulletins at 15:00 UTC that day. The system then moved into the northern Atlantic Ocean where it continued to weaken until dissipating the following day.

== Preparations ==
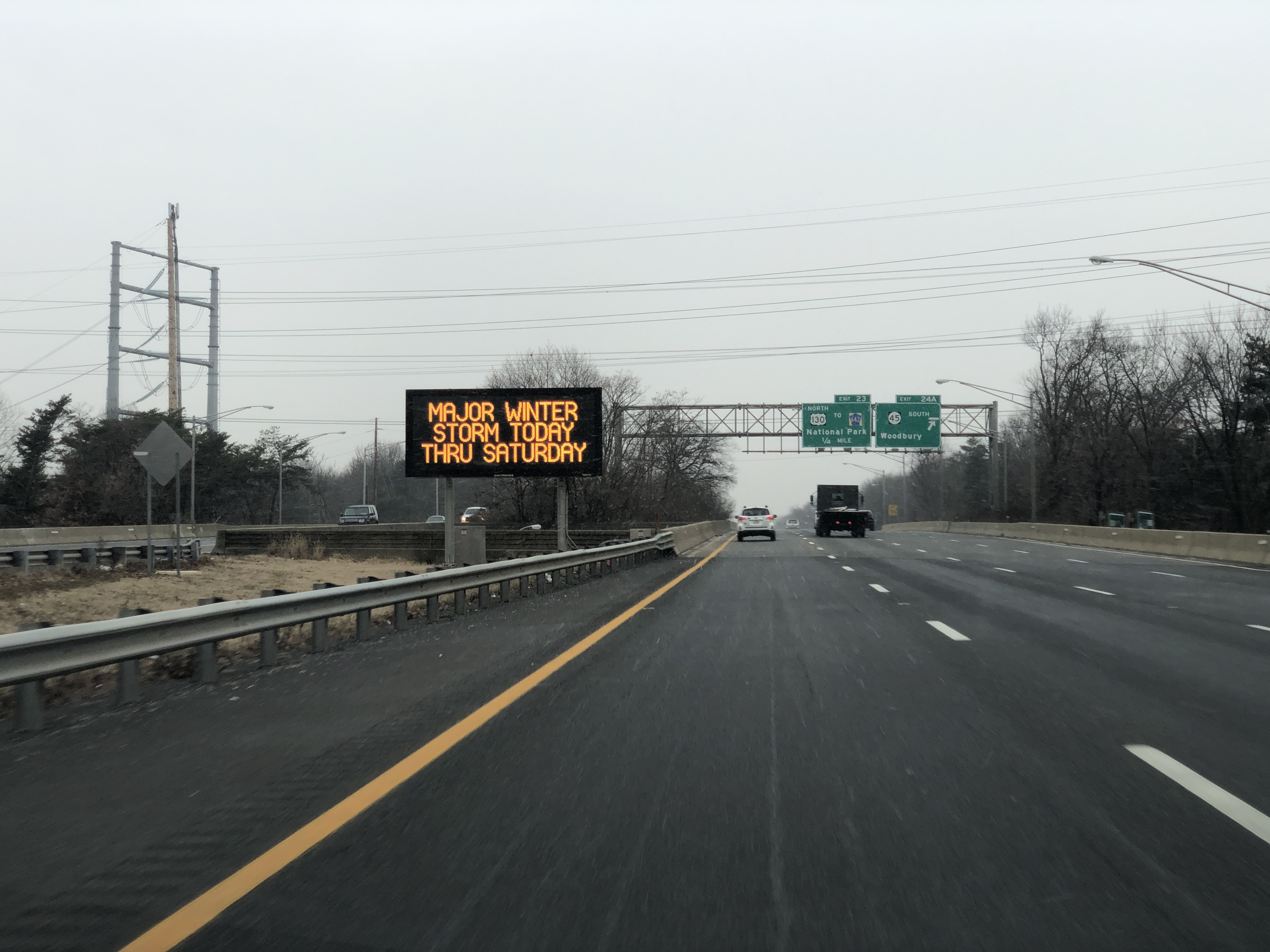
Signage on Interstate 295 in New Jersey warning drivers of the impending winter storm on January 28

Winter storm warnings were issued for the states along US East Coast from South Carolina to Maine, including the cities of New York City, Philadelphia and Providence, while blizzard warnings were issued for coastal areas from Delaware to Maine, including Boston and Atlantic City. In Canada, winter storm warnings were issued for New Brunswick, Prince Edward Island and Nova Scotia. Approximately 1,200 flights were cancelled across the United States ahead of the storm. Amtrak cancelled most trains along the Washington-to-Boston Corridor for January 29 and most trains between New York and Boston for January 30 while offering reduced service to points westward on January 29.

=== Southeastern United States ===
Virginia declared a state of emergency on January 27 in preparation for the storm system. On January 28, Hampton Roads Transit, which offers bus and light rail transit in the Newport News-Virginia Beach-Norfolk metropolitan area, cancelled service for January 29.

=== Mid-Atlantic United States ===
==== Delaware and Maryland ====
In Delaware, Governor John Carney declared a state of emergency for Kent and Sussex counties and authorized for the Delaware National Guard to provide assistance. In addition, Level 2 Driving Restrictions were issued for Kent and Sussex counties while a Level 1 Driving Warning was issued for New Castle County effective at 10 p.m. on January 28.

In Maryland Governor Larry Hogan declared a state of emergency for nine counties on the Eastern Shore and mobilized the Maryland National Guard. A blizzard warning was issued for Somerset, Wicomico, and Worcester counties.

==== New Jersey and Pennsylvania ====
Major roadways in New Jersey such as Interstate 95 and Interstate 78 were being brined by the New Jersey Department of Transportation since January 26. Officials in Atlantic City announced a parking ban would go into effect at 5 p.m. on January 28, in addition to opening shelters. Governor Phil Murphy declared a state of emergency the same day as well, urging residents to stay off the roads. New Jersey Transit suspended all bus services for the day of January 29 due to the storm.

In Pennsylvania, a winter storm warning was issued. The city of Philadelphia declared a snow emergency effective at 7 p.m. on January 28.

=== Northeastern United States ===
==== New York ====
New York governor Kathy Hochul on January 28 urged residents, particularly those further east in the Long Island region, to prepare for high winds, power outages and near-blizzard conditions. People were also urged to not travel at the height of the storm. Hochul also ordered that state emergency assets be ready in case the system tracked further west. A "snow alert" was declared in New York City by the New York Department of Sanitation that day as well. On Long Island, Public Service Enterprise Group crews worked to cut tree branches in order to prevent power outages from snow weighing down on the branches and breaking. The Long Island Railroad suspended service for the following day and the Metro-North Railroad suspended service on most routes and provided reduced service on the remainder. All New York City ferries that day were cancelled.

==== New England ====
In Boston, Massachusetts, officials warned of up to 30 inches (76 cm) of snow through early on January 29. Early on January 28, a Blizzard Warning was issued for Rhode Island, Coastal New Hampshire, Eastern Massachusetts, and much of Maine. Some of the same states also issued Snow emergencies and parking bans in small towns and cities. Certain facilities of Cape Cod National Seashore closed before the storm. The entire state of Rhode Island had a travel ban for non-emergency vehicles from 8am to 8pm on January 29.

=== Canada ===
Environment Canada issued winter storm warnings for New Brunswick, Prince Edward Island (P.E.I.) and Nova Scotia, where heavy snow, freezing rain and strong winds were expected, adding that blowing snow would lead to "near zero" visibility on roads Saturday morning and afternoon. Environment Canada predicted that winds with maximum gusts of 80 to 110 km/h would likely cause power and utility outages and that areas along the Atlantic Coast could have high storm surges which could lead to flooding. Nova Scotia announced that it would open its Emergency Operations Centre Saturday at 10.p.m. The Confederation Bridge connecting New Brunswick to P.E.I. announced Saturday morning they would be prohibiting all vehicles aside from regular passenger vehicles from using the bridge due to the oncoming storm.

== Impact ==
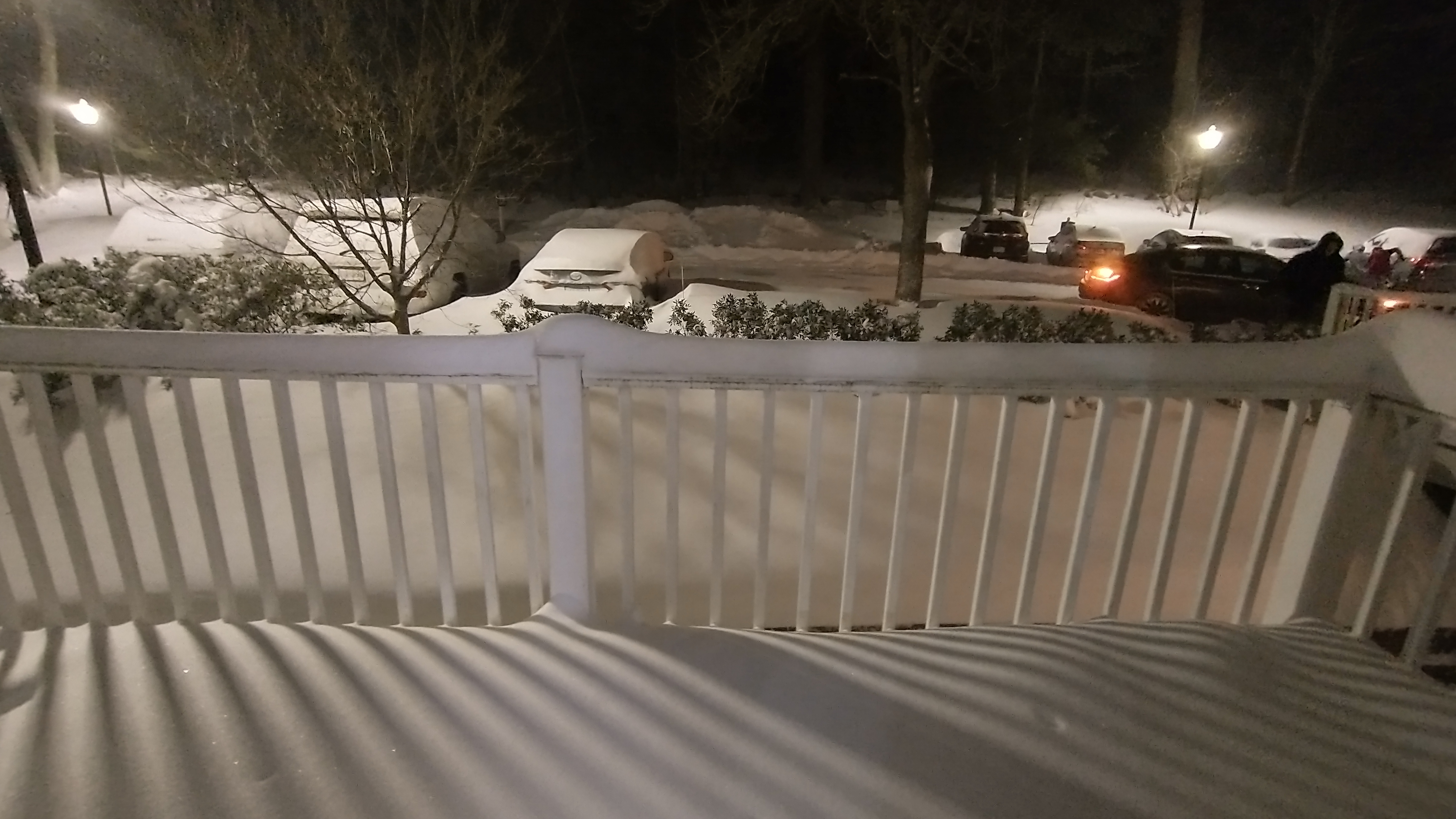
19 inches (48 cm) of snow blanketing the ground in Lexington, MA after the blizzard on the evening of January 29. Snow drifts were almost as high as 30 inches (76 cm) in some areas.

Blizzard conditions occurred, as confirmed by the National Weather Service, from Friday evening to Saturday afternoon along the coasts of Delaware and New Jersey and throughout Suffolk County on Long Island, as well as throughout most of Saturday in New London on Connecticut's coast, throughout Rhode Island, throughout eastern Massachusetts as far west as Worcester and Cape Code to the east, and in most areas of Maine. Most of these areas received between 12 and 24 inches (30 and 61 cm) of snow, with eastern Massachusetts receiving as much as 30 inches (76 cm). Blizzard conditions also occurred in significant areas of New Brunswick, Prince Edward Island and Nova Scotia although snow fall amounts were less, the most being 16 inches (41 cm).

=== Southeastern United States ===
The northeastern area of North Carolina and Norfolk and Virginia Beach in Virginia received between 2 and 4 inches (5.1 and 10.2 cm) of snow from early evening on January 28 until mid-morning on January 29, with winds gusts of up to 50 mph (80 km/h) bringing down tree branches. Freezing temperatures as low as 16 °F (−9 °C) caused icy road conditions until the morning of January 30 with the Virginia Department of Transportation asking drivers to stay off the roads. To the north, the Eastern Shore of Virginia (Delmarva Peninsula) received up to 10 inches (25 cm) of snow amid whiteout conditions.

=== Mid-Atlantic United States ===
==== Maryland and Delaware ====
Ocean City on the Atlantic coast of Maryland received 12 inches (30 cm) of snow with high winds of up to 45 miles per hour making travel treacherous for motorists. Maryland State Police responded to almost 1,800 calls for assistance, including 190 vehicle crashes, throughout the state during the storm. The Delaware coast had snowfalls of 11 inches (28 cm) along its southern sections and as much as 14 inches (36 cm) in Lewes, further north, while inland, Wilmington received 3 inches (7.6 cm). The school district of Sussex County in southern Delaware cancelled classes for Monday, January 31.

==== New Jersey and Pennsylvania ====
Atlantic City, New Jersey was battered by blizzard conditions which dumped 16 inches (41 cm) of snow, the third highest snowfall in the city's history. This, combined with nor’easters earlier in the month, led January 2022 to become the snowiest January on record there. Atlantic City's Fire Chief indicated that a number of ambulances and police cars were getting stuck in the heavy snow. The Bayville section of Berkeley Township, on the coast north of Atlantic City, had the highest snowfall in New Jersey with 21 inches (53 cm). The National Weather Service verified that the entire southern New Jersey coastline had blizzard conditions on the night of January 28 to the afternoon on January 29. New Jersey banned commercial vehicles, including tractor-trailers, from using Interstate highways in the state until the blizzard passed. Newark received 7.1 inches (18 cm) of snow and more than 600 flights (about 85%) at Newark Liberty Airport were cancelled. Inland, in Pennsylvania, Philadelphia received 7.5 inches (19 cm) of snow and over 300 flights in or out of Philadelphia airport had to be cancelled. Following the snowstorm, Philadelphia had a record long streak of days without 1 inch (2.5 cm) of snow, which was snapped on January 15, 2024.

=== Northeastern United States ===
==== New York ====
Suffolk County, which comprises the central and eastern areas of Long Island, bore the brunt of the storm with snowfalls as high 24.7 inches (63 cm) at MacArthur Airport in Ronkonkoma and winds approaching 60 miles per hour (97 km/h) creating blizzard conditions. The 23.5 in (60 cm) on January 29 made it the snowiest day on record there, narrowly eclipsing January 23, 2016. This snow pushed January’s snow total in Islip up to 31.8 in (81 cm), making it the second snowiest January there. Roads described as treacherous due to whiteout conditions resulted in 126 car accidents being reported in Suffolk County and many cars needing assistance after getting stuck in deep snow. The National Weather Service verified wind and visibility conditions in the county throughout most of January 29 constituted a blizzard. In addition to previous transit cancellations, the Nassau Inter-County Express, which serves Suffolk and Nassau County to its west, suspended bus service for the day at 11:30 a.m. On January 30, service on the Long Island Railway experienced delays due to heavy snow remaining on the tracks with some trains being replaced by buses. A man in Cutchogue, Long Island drowned while shoveling snow in a pool area after falling into a pool. An elderly woman died in Nassau County due to being stuck in her car. Two others died while shoveling snow on Long Island, one of them in Syosset.

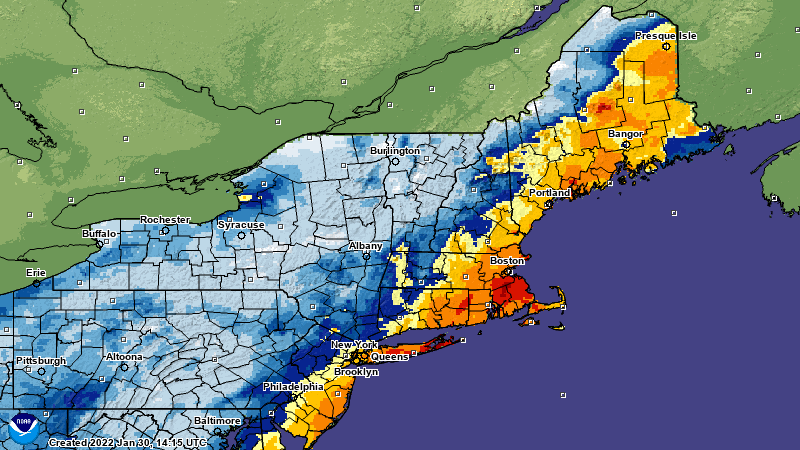
Observed snowfall totals from the blizzard in the Northeastern United States

Other snowfall accumulations included 19.2 in (49 cm) in Levittown in Nassau County, 11.5 in (29 cm) in Queens, and 8.3 in (21 cm) in Central Park in New York City. New York Subway service to Rockaway, Queens and service on a handful of other above-ground sections was suspended. The New York Islanders hockey game against the Seattle Kraken that night was rescheduled for the following Wednesday. LaGuardia Airport indicated that 556 flights (98%) on January 29 had to be cancelled, while John F. Kennedy reported nearly 900 flights (about 75%) were cancelled. Hundreds more flights for the morning of January 30 were also cancelled. Two tractor trailers tipped over on Interstate 95 near the city of New Rochelle, New York during the storm, reducing traffic to only one lane.

==== Rhode Island and Connecticut ====
Providence received a new all-time daily record for snow with 18.8 inches (48 cm) on January 29, breaking the previous record of 18.3 inches (46 cm) from February 4, 1961. With a total of 19.3 inches (49 cm) of snow falling in Providence from late January 28 until the afternoon of January 29, this blizzard dropped the fourth-largest snowfall on record, only surpassed by blizzards in 1978, 1996, and 2005. Warren, a southern suburb of Providence, had the highest snowfall amount in Rhode Island at 25.0 inches (64 cm) and wind gusts as high as 75 miles per hour were recorded in the state. Due to the low level of visibility caused by the blizzard, the Governor of Rhode Island banned all vehicles from using any of the state's roads from 8 a.m. until 8 p.m. The Governor later closed several bridges to all traffic except for emergency vehicles, including the only links to the Newport area of the state which experienced zero visibility blizzard conditions from 7 a.m. to 5 p.m on January 29. Most school boards in Rhode Island closed their schools for January 31 due to snow clearing not being completed.

In Connecticut, the highest snowfalls were in the southeast of the state such as New London and Norwich seeing 21 and 22 inches (53 and 56 cm), respectively, while Bridgeport to the west saw 10.5 inches (27 cm) and Hartford to the north saw 8.5 inches (22 cm). All bus service in Connecticut was suspended for Saturday.

==== Massachusetts ====
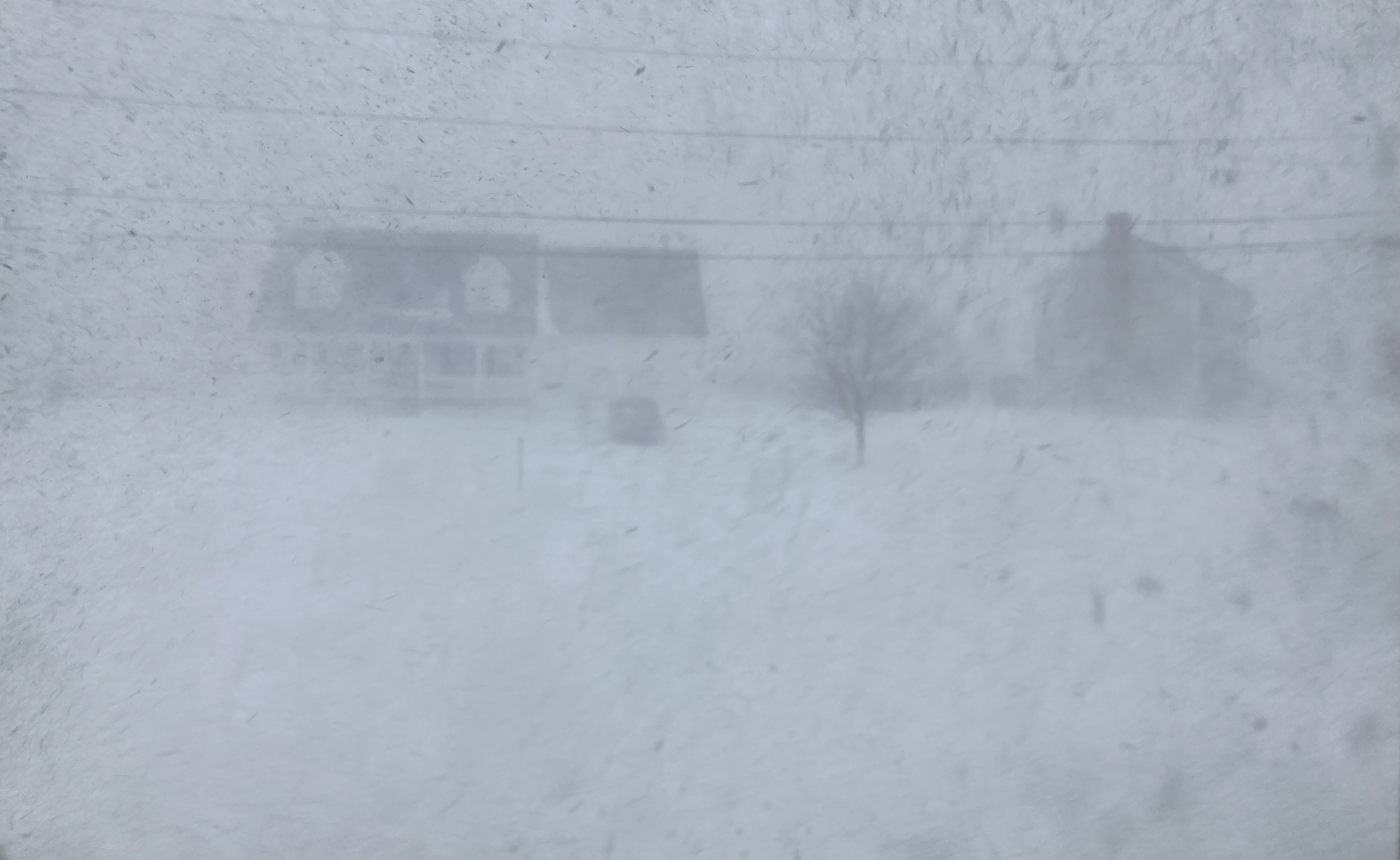
Very heavy snow and near whiteout conditions during the peak of the storm in Attleboro, MA

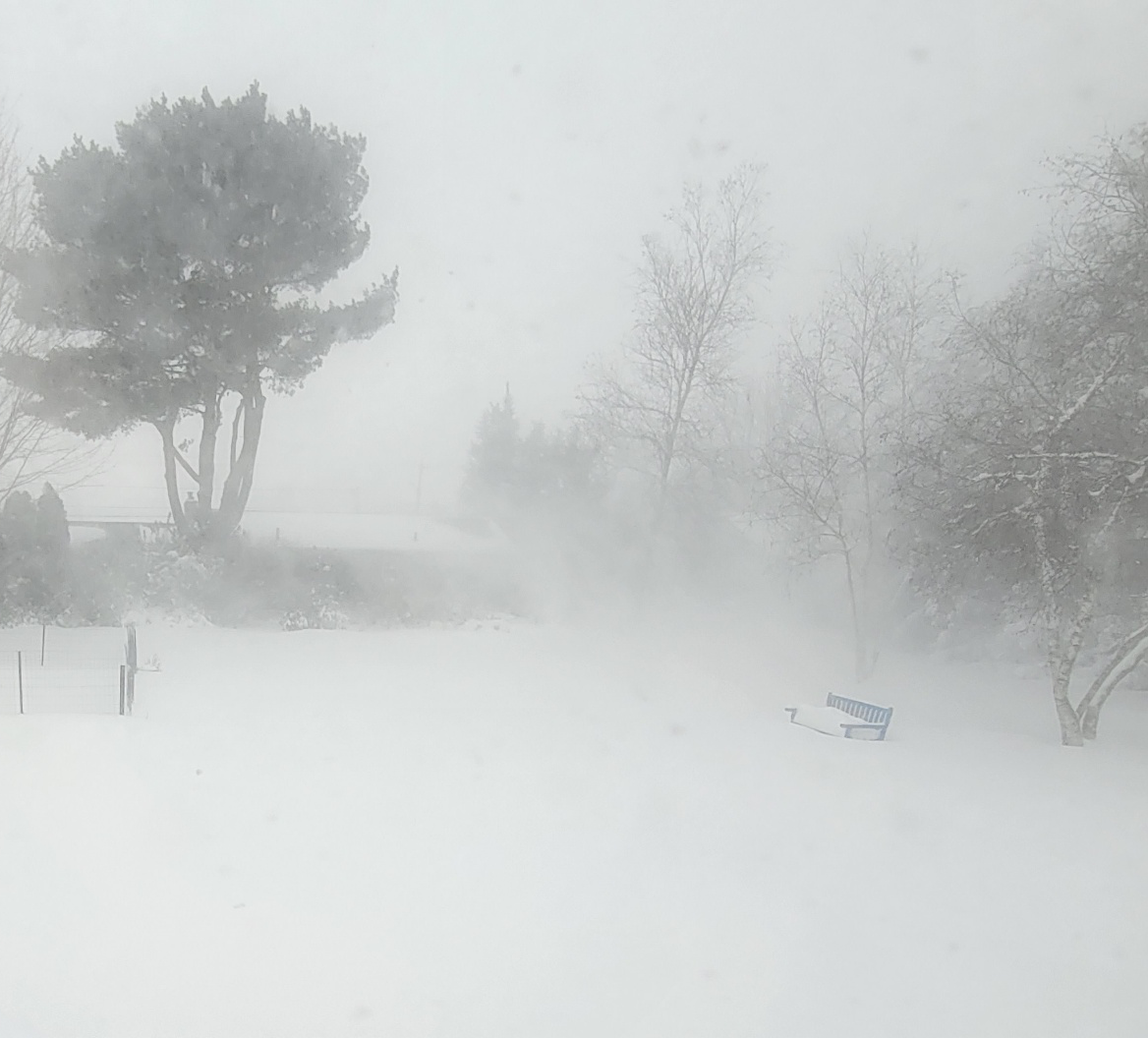
Near-whiteout conditions in Seekonk, MA during the peak of the blizzard. Approximately 20 inches (51 cm) of snow had fallen at the time.

The blizzard deposited 24.2 inches (61 cm) in Boston from late Friday night until Saturday late afternoon, making it the seventh-largest snowstorm for Boston, behind storms in 2003, 1978, 1969, 1997, 2013, and 2015. The 23.6 inches (60 cm) of snow the city received on Saturday, January 29 tied its all-time one-day snowfall record first set on February 17, 2003. Snow was falling at rates of between 2 and 4 inches (5.1 and 10.2 centimeters) an hour, and was being blown by winds up to 70 mph (110 km/h) resulting in blizzard and near zero visibility conditions for most of Eastern Massachusetts, including Cape Cod, for most of Saturday's daylight hours. Massachusetts banned heavy trucks from state highways. Commuter rail into Boston had significant delays and cancellations throughout the day, a number of bus routes' service was suspended due to poor visibility (with about 30 buses getting stuck in heavy snow), and service on two surface sections of two subway lines was replaced with buses. Approximately 91% of arrivals and departures, 617 flights in total, were cancelled at Boston's Logan Airport on January 29. Many flights for the morning of January 30 were also cancelled. Boston ran buses on some segments of its subway lines on January 30 and during the evening of January 31 to enable full clearing of snow from subway tracks.

Cities on the southern edge of the Boston metropolitan area had the heaviest snowfalls in Massachusetts with Stoughton being hit with 30.9 inches (78 cm), Sharon with 30.4 inches (77 cm), and Quincy with 30 inches (76 cm), while Plymouth on the east shore got 24.7 inches (63 cm) and New Bedford on the south shore received 18.5 inches (47 cm). At one point more than 120,000 homes were out of power in southeastern Massachusetts, including the entire town of Provincetown on Cape Cod. Wave swells as large as 15 feet (4.6 meters) caused coastal flooding, most notably in downtown Nantucket on Martha's Vineyard and in North Weymouth, south of Boston. The waves, driven by wind gusts as high as 99 miles/hour (160 km/h), also caused significant erosion along parts of Cape Cod's beaches, particularly near Truro, close to the tip of the Cape, where at least one house was left perched precariously. The departure of the blizzard left behind frigid temperatures across the region, with a minus 3 F wind chill temperature in Boston the morning of January 30. Numerous school boards closed their schools for January 31 while others opened schools two hour late; the City of Boston had planned to have all schools open on January 31 but some ended up remaining closed that day due to snow remaining uncleared. The night of January 31, many streets in Boston were still clogged with snow, so the city moved hundreds of truckloads of snow from clogged areas to nine designated "snow farms".

==== Northern New England ====
Southwestern Maine was subjected to blizzard conditions from Saturday morning to evening with winds as fast as 66 miles/hour (106 km/h) and snowfalls ranging from 12.5 inches (32 cm) in Portland to as high as 22 inches (56 cm) in Veazie near Bangor. Temperatures were so low that windshield wipers on snow plows were freezing, forcing drivers to pull over to clear them. Most public transportation systems, including those in Portland and Bangor, suspended service. About 5,500 households experienced power outages due to tree branches falling onto power lines. Strong winds also caused a tree to crash through a house in Raymond, but no one was injured. The high winds also caused coastal flooding in Hampton Beach and winds were so high offshore that a hurricane-force wind warning was issued for the islands off the coast. In northeastern Maine, Houlton received 15 inches (38 cm) of snow and had blizzard conditions intermittently from Saturday afternoon until very early Sunday morning.

In New Hampshire, the deepest snowfall was 17 inches (43 cm) in Hampton Falls on the coast, while Rye, near Portsmouth, received 13.5 inches (34 cm), and inland, Concord, received 5.5 inches (14 cm). Multiple snow sightings were reported in Vermont reported including 2 inches (51 mm) of in southwestern Vermont.

=== Canada ===
==== New Brunswick ====
The storm lashed much of New Brunswick with snow and high winds from the late morning hours of January 29 until the morning of January 30. Moncton received the highest amount of snow with 40 centimetres (16 in), while Saint John, Fredericton and Grand Manan Island each saw about 25 centimetres (9.8 in) of snow; in northern New Brunswick, Edmunston received about 19 centimetres (7.5 in) and Miramichi received 33 centimetres (13 in). Peak gusts of winds reached as high as 96 km/h on Grand Manan Island and about 90 km/h in both Moncton and Saint John. Moncton experienced zero visibility due to blowing snow from 11 a.m. to 7 p.m. on January 29. Several cities in New Brunswick declared overnight parking bans, Fredericton and Saint John suspended transit service, and ferry services to the islands in the Grand Manan area were suspended. Snow-clearing crews in New Brunswick and across the Canadian Maritimes were still clearing roads and sidewalks on January 31.

==== Prince Edward Island ====
Soon after the storm hit Prince Edward Island (P.E.I.) on January 29, police warned all drivers to stay off the roads due to the whiteout conditions and reported stranded and abandoned vehicles. At 3 p.m., the Confederation Bridge linking New Brunswick to P.E.I. was closed and ferry connections to the Island were also suspended. The storm deposited 36 centimetres (14 in) of snow on Charlottetown with the precipitation switching to freezing rain late in the evening.

==== Nova Scotia ====
Blowing snow caused whiteout conditions on many highways in Nova Scotia on January 29 with some cars getting stuck in heavy snow. Police urged residents to stay home and advised that if they had to drive, to drive slowly and use their four-way flashing lights. Wind gust of up to 110 km/h were recorded and late in the day, the snow changed to ice pellets and freezing rain, then to rain, and then in some areas, back to snow early on January 30. The Trans-Canada Highway connecting Nova Scotia and New Brunswick was closed by police at 3 p.m. Ferry service from Sydney to Newfoundland and from Digby to New Brunswick was cancelled and urban areas, including Sydney and Yarmouth, suspended transit. Yarmouth had 16.5 centimetres (6.5 in) of snow and 17.2 millimetres (0.68 in) of rain, Sydney had 11.2 centimetres (4.4 in) of snow and 94.8 millimetres (3.73 in) of rain, but some areas had as much as 40 centimetres (16 in) of snow. Halifax received about 25 centimetres (9.8 in) of snow and 16.7 millimetres (0.66 in) of rain with near zero visibility due to blowing snow for a fews hours at midday and again overnight. Halifax pulled its buses off the roads for several hours midday. At one point, 8,000 households province-wide were without electricity and various organizations, including public libraries, recreational facilities, manufacturers and universities, closed for the day.

== See also ==
- Weather of 2022
- January 31 – February 3, 2021 nor'easter
- North American blizzard of 2003
- 1978 Northeastern United States blizzard
- January 2015 North American blizzard
- January 2018 North American blizzard
