= Petit Étang =

Community in Nova Scotia, Canada

Coordinates: 46°38′54.58″N 60°58′37.65″W

Petit Étang in Nova Scotia

Petit Étang is a small Acadian community in the Canadian province of Nova Scotia, located in Inverness County. The name is French, meaning "little pond".

In 1956, Petit Étang had a population of 512 people.
