= St. Joseph du Moine, Nova Scotia =

Community in Nova Scotia, Canada

Coordinates: 46°31′27.78″N 61°3′47.57″W

St. Joseph du Moine in Nova Scotia

St. Joseph du Moine is an unincorporated community in the Canadian province of Nova Scotia, located in the Municipality of the County of Inverness. It is on the scenic Cabot Trail near Cape Breton Highlands National Park. Together with Chéticamp, its larger neighbour, Saint-Joseph-du-Moine makes up an Acadian enclave on Cape Breton Island that remains Francophone to this day; the inhabitants speak Acadian French. The Université Sainte-Anne has a campus in Saint-Joseph-du-Moine. 28.7% of the population have a one or three year degree.
