= CFRT-FM =

Radio station in Iqaluit, Nunavut, Canada

- Iqaluit, Nunavut; Canada
- Frequency: 107.3 MHz
- Branding: CFRT 107.3 FM

Programming
- Format: Community radio

Ownership
- Owner: Association des Francophones de Nunavut

History
- First air date: March 1994

Technical information
- Class: LP
- ERP: 27 watts vertical polarization only
- HAAT: 10 meters
- Transmitter coordinates: 63°44′21″N 68°33′21″W

Links
- Website: cfrt.ca

CFRT-FM is a Canadian radio station, broadcasting at 107.3 FM in Iqaluit, Nunavut.

A community radio station for the city's francophone community, it broadcasts a mix of original programming and syndication from other French radio networks, including the Alliance des radios communautaires du Canada, Ici Radio-Canada Première and Radio France Internationale.

The station was first licensed by the CRTC in 1993 and signed on in March 1994.
