= CFED-FM =

Radio station in Edmonton, Alberta, Canada

Coordinates: 53.5224906°N 113.4685655°W

- Edmonton, Alberta; Canada
- Broadcast area: Edmonton Metropolitan Region
- Frequency: 97.9 MHz
- Branding: Radio Cité 97,9

Programming
- Language: French
- Format: Community radio

Ownership
- Owner: Société de la radio communautaire du Grand Edmonton

History
- First air date: October 6, 2018

Technical information
- Class: A1
- ERP: 113 watts
- HAAT: 38 metres

Links
- Website: CFED-FM

CFED-FM (Radio Cité 97,9) is a radio station in Edmonton, Alberta, Canada, broadcasting at 97.9 FM. A francophone community radio station for the city's Franco-Albertan community, the station was launched in 2018 by the Société de la radio communautaire du Grand Edmonton.

The station's license was approved by the Canadian Radio-television and Telecommunications Commission in January 2017. During the station's planning phase, it received nearly $700,000 in startup grants from Western Economic Diversification Canada and the Department of Canadian Heritage.

The station went on the air on October 6, 2018. Its schedule incorporates both locally produced programming and programs syndicated from the Alliance des radios communautaires du Canada and Radio France Internationale.
