= List of television stations in Saskatchewan =

This is a list of broadcast television stations serving cities in the Canadian province of Saskatchewan.

City of licence	Analog channel	Digital channel	Virtual channel	Callsign	Network	Notes
Carlyle Lake Resort	7			CIEW-TV	CTV	satellite of CICC-TV Yorkton
Lloydminster		2	2.1	CKSA-DT	Global	
Lloydminster		4	4.1	CITL-DT	CTV	
Moose Jaw	7			CKMJ-TV	CTV	satellite of CKCK-DT Regina
North Battleford	6			CFQC-TV-2	CTV	satellite of CFQC-DT Saskatoon
Prince Albert	9			CIPA-TV	CTV	
Regina		2	8.1	CKCK-DT	CTV	
Regina		9	9.1	CBKT-DT	CBC	
Regina		11	11.1	CFRE-DT	Global	
Regina		13	13.1	CBKFT-DT	R-C	
Regina		Cable-only		Citytv Saskatchewan	Citytv	
Regina		Cable Only	Saskatchewan Legislative Assembly	Saskatchewan Legislative Assembly		
Saskatoon		4	42.1	CFSK-DT	Global	
Saskatoon		8	8.1	CFQC-DT	CTV	
Swift Current	12			CKMC-TV	CTV	satellite of CKCK-DT Regina
Wynyard	12			CIWH-TV	CTV	satellite of CICC-TV Yorkton
Yorkton	10			CICC-TV	CTV	

== Defunct stations ==
- Channel 4: CHAB-TV - CBC - Moose Jaw
- Channel 5: CKBI-TV - CBC - Prince Albert
- Channel 5: CJFB-TV - CBC - Swift Current
- Channel 5: CKOS-TV - CBC - Yorkton
- Channel 11: CBKST - CBC - Saskatoon

== See also ==
- List of television stations in Canada
- Media in Canada
