= Media in Saskatoon =

This is a list of media outlets in Saskatoon, Saskatchewan.

== Radio ==
Frequency	Call sign	Branding	Format	Owner	Notes
AM 600	CJWW	CJWW 600	Country music	Saskatoon Media Group	
AM 650	CKOM	NewsTalk 650	News radio, talk radio	Rawlco Communications	
AM 860	CBKF-2	Ici Radio-Canada Première	Talk radio, public radio	Canadian Broadcasting Corporation	Rebroadcaster of CBKF-FM (Regina)
FM 88.7	CKSB-FM-2	Ici Musique	Adult contemporary, public radio	Canadian Broadcasting Corporation	Rebroadcaster of CKSB-FM (Winnipeg)
FM 90.5	CFCR-FM	CFCR 90.5	community radio	Community Radio Society of Saskatoon	
FM 91.7	CITT-FM	–	Tourist information	Saskatoon Visitor and Convention Bureau	
FM 92.9	CKBL-FM	92.9 The Bull	Country music	Saskatoon Media Group	
FM 94.1	CBK-1-FM	CBC Radio One	Talk radio, public radio	Canadian Broadcasting Corporation	Rebroadcaster of CBK (Watrous/Regina)
FM 95.1	CFMC-FM	C95	Contemporary hit radio	Rawlco Communications	
FM 96.3	CFWD-FM	96.3 Cruz FM	Adult hits	Harvard Broadcasting	Formerly known as Wired 96.3
FM 98.3	CJMK-FM	98 Cool FM	Classic hits	Saskatoon Media Group	Formerly known as Magic 98.3
FM 100.3	CFAQ-FM	Anointed 100.3	Christian music	Bertor Communications	
FM 102.1	CJDJ-FM	Rock 102	Active rock	Rawlco Communications	
FM 103.1	CIHX-FM	UCB Radio	Christian music	UCB Radio Canada	
FM 104.1	CIRN-FM	MBC Radio	Community radio	Missinipi Broadcasting Corporation	First Nations community radio; rebroadcaster of CJLR-FM (La Ronge)
FM 105.5	CBKS-FM	CBC Music	Adult contemporary, public radio	Canadian Broadcasting Corporation	Rebroadcaster of CBK-FM (Regina)

=== Defunct stations ===
CFNS was a francophone community radio station which aired from 1952 to 1973. It was purchased by the Canadian Broadcasting Corporation in 1973, and continues to broadcast as CBKF-2 860.

CJUS-FM, which ceased broadcasting in 1985, was the campus radio station of the University of Saskatchewan. The university has never launched another terrestrial radio station, although an Internet radio operation was launched in 2005 under the CJUS name.

== Television ==
OTA virtual channel (PSIP)	OTA actual channel	Shaw Communications	SaskTel Max	Call sign	Network	Notes
4.1	20 (UHF)	3	5	CFSK-DT	Global	
8.1	8 (VHF)	9	4	CFQC-DT	CTV	
–	–	7	19	City Saskatchewan	City	Former provincial public broadcaster; airs educational television and cultural programming from 6 a.m. to 3 p.m.
–	–	10	–	–	Shaw TV	Community channel for Shaw Cable subscribers

As of 2022, CFQC and CFSK are the only full-fledged stations in Saskatoon.

Saskatoon was previously served by CBKST channel 11, a semi-satellite of Regina's CBC Television outlet CBKT-DT; and CBKFT-1 channel 13, a repeater of Radio-Canada outlet CBKFT-DT. However, CBKST and its network of 20 associated rebroadcasters were officially licensed as CBKT rebroadcasters. As a result, both stations, which were never upgraded to digital, ceased operations on July 31, 2012, along with all of the CBC's analogue rebroadcasters. As a result, both CBC and Radio-Canada are available only on cable and satellite in Saskatoon (though both continue to be available on their longstanding Shaw Cable stations, 12 and 2, respectively). However, as most households in Saskatoon have cable or satellite, few residents lost access to CBC or Radio-Canada programming.

The main cable television provider in Saskatoon is Shaw Cable (formerly known as Telecable), which began servicing the city in 1978. Network programming from the United States is currently received on cable via satellite from affiliates in Detroit, Michigan and Rochester, New York (and, briefly, WTOL in Toledo, Ohio, after WJBK switched networks in 1994).

When cable transmissions began in the late 1970s in Saskatoon, American network programming was initially piped in via microwave transmission from broadcasters in North Dakota, beginning with KUMV-TV & KXMD-TV in Williston, North Dakota. They were later joined by KTHI (now KVLY) from Fargo and KGFE (Prairie Public Television) from Grand Forks. In the early 1980s, KTHI was briefly replaced by WDAZ-TV from Devil's Lake. In October 1984, the Canadian Radio-television and Telecommunications Commission (CRTC) approved an application by Telecable and other Saskatchewan cable providers to replace these signals with that of stations from Seattle, Washington and Detroit, though ultimately Saskatoon consumers only received the Detroit stations. The switch occurred almost immediately after the decision was handed down. An additional broadcaster from Rochester, New York, WUHF, was added after the 1986 launch of the Fox network, and as noted above a broadcaster from Toledo was briefly carried after one of the Detroit stations changed affiliation.

In addition to US broadcasters, the advent of cable in the Saskatoon market saw the launch of a community access channel initially branded as Telecable Ten, and from the early 1980s until its closure the Prince Albert station CKBI was also carried in the Saskatoon market via cable.

US superstations, as well as (sustainable) Canadian and US-based cable network programming began to emerge in the 1990s and continues to be available via Shaw or satellite providers. Digital cable service is also available.

As well, SaskTel provides cable television service through their service. On this cable system, American network programming is received from affiliates in Boston, Massachusetts, Minneapolis, Minnesota and Seattle, Washington.

In 1978-1979, Saskatoon was serviced by CPN, a Saskatchewan-based cable system and competitor to Telecable that provided several first-generation specialty channels (including HBO) for about two years before folding. A Saskatchewan-based movie channel, Teletheatre, served Saskatoon during the early 1980s until it was replaced by what would eventually become Movie Central. Like other Canadian centres, Saskatoon viewers also received C Channel and other premium cable networks that survived for a short time in 1983.

== Newspapers ==
=== Daily ===
- Saskatoon StarPhoenix - the city's only daily newspaper from 1928 to 2012, and again following the closure of the Saskatoon edition of Metro in the mid-2010s.
- Like most cities in Canada, Saskatoon also receives the national editions of The Globe and Mail and National Post.

=== Weekly and bi-weekly ===
- Bridges - published by the StarPhoenix since 2012
- The Saskatoon Mirror
- Saskatoon Shopper - formerly independent, now distributed on Thursdays by The StarPhoenix
- The Sheaf - University of Saskatchewan student newspaper
- The Sunday Phoenix - formerly the Saskatoon Sun, published by The StarPhoenix
- The Western Producer - weekly newspaper
- L'Eau vive - francophone newspaper

=== Monthly ===
- Business Today - founded by G. Rekve; was published for 3 years; was distributed province-wide as a paid-for newspaper
- Eagle Feather News

=== Defunct ===
- Saskatoon Express - weekly local community information
- Metro- daily Swedish-based commuter newspaper franchise that launched a Saskatoon edition on April 2, 2012
- Saskatoon Commentator - weekly community newspaper in the 1970s-80s
- Saskatoon Free Press - twice weekly newspaper in the 1990s
- Saskatoon Phoenix - 1902-1928; later became part of the StarPhoenix
- Saskatoon Sentinel - first newspaper, published in 1884
- Saskatoon Sun - weekly published by the StarPhoenix; relaunched as Sunday Phoenix in 2012
- Verb - general interest, ceased publication in 2015
