= Media in Prince Albert, Saskatchewan =

This is a list of media in Prince Albert, Saskatchewan.

== Radio ==
The following stations are those local to Prince Albert, as well as those outside the area that can be tuned in easily.

Call sign	Frequency	City of License	Owner	Format	Common name	Notes
CBK	540 AM	Watrous, Saskatchewan	Canadian Broadcasting Corporation	Public News/Talk	CBC Radio 1	
CKSW	570 AM	Swift Current, Saskatchewan	Golden West Broadcasting	Country		
CJWW	600 AM	Saskatoon, Saskatchewan	Saskatoon Media Group	Country		
CKRM	620 AM	Regina, Saskatchewan	Harvard Broadcasting	Country		
CKOM	650 AM	Saskatoon, Saskatchewan	Rawlco Radio	News/Talk	News Talk 650	
CKJH	750 AM	Melfort, Saskatchewan	Radio CJVR	Oldies	CK 750	
CBKF-2	860 AM	Saskatoon, Saskatchewan	Canadian Broadcasting Corporation	Public News/Talk (French)	Ici Radio-Canada Première	Re-broadcaster of CBKF-FM
CKBI	900 AM	Prince Albert, Saskatchewan	Jim Pattison Broadcast Group	Country	Country 900 CKBI	
CJLR-FM-3	88.1 FM	Prince Albert, Saskatchewan	Missinipi Broadcasting Corporation	First Nations Community Radio	MBC	
CBK-FM-1	89.1 FM	Prince Albert, Saskatchewan	Canadian Broadcasting Corporation	Public Music	CBC Radio 2	Re-broadcaster of CBK-FM
CKSF-FM	90.1 FM	Prince Albert, Saskatchewan	Société canadienne-française de Prince Albert	Public News/Talk (French)	Ici Radio-Canada Première	Re-broadcaster of CBKF-FM
CFMM-FM	99.1 FM	Prince Albert, Saskatchewan	Jim Pattison Broadcast Group	Hot Adult Contemporary	Power 99 FM	
CIAM-FM-10	100.1 FM	Buckland, Saskatchewan	CIAM Media & Radio Broadcasting Association	Community Christian radio	CIAM ("C-I-Am")	
CHQX-FM	101.5 FM	Prince Albert, Saskatchewan	Jim Pattison Broadcast Group	Classic hits	Beach Radio	

== Television ==
- Channel 8 CIPA-TV, CTV
- Cable 9 Citytv Saskatchewan
- Cable 10 Shaw TV, local community channel from Shaw Cable

Prince Albert was previously served by CKBI-TV channel 5, a private CBC Television outlet; this station would close down in 2002, with its transmitter becoming CBKST-9, a repeater of CBKST Saskatoon (which in turn was a semi-satellite of CBKT Regina), upon its sale to the CBC. CBKST-9 closed down on July 31, 2012, due to budget cuts handed down by the CBC. CBC broadcasts continue to be received in the city via CBKT-DT in Regina.

== Newspapers ==
- Prince Albert Daily Herald
- Prince Albert Shopper
- Rural Roots

== Internet Access ==
In February 2007, Prince Albert was selected as one of four cities in Saskatchewan to provide free-of-charge wireless Internet access. The free Internet access, made possible through the Government of Saskatchewan's " The Saskatchewan Connected Initiative", will be available to the city's downtown area, as well as the Saskatchewan Institute of Applied Science and Technology (SIAST) Woodland Campus.
