= List of CBC Television stations =

CBC Television is a Canadian English language public television network made up of fourteen owned-and-operated stations. Some privately owned stations were formerly affiliated with the network until as late as August 2016. This is a table listing of CBC Television's stations, arranged by market. This article also includes former self-supporting stations later operating as rebroadcasters of regional affiliates, stations no longer affiliated with CBC Television, and stations purchased by the CBC that formerly operated as private CBC Television affiliates.

The station's virtual channel number (if applicable) follows the call letters. The number in parentheses that follows is the station's actual digital channel number; digital channels allocated for future use listed in parentheses are italicized.

CBC Television's O&Os operate for the most part as a seamless national service, with few deviations from the national schedule. The network's former private affiliates had some flexibility to carry a reduced schedule of network programming if they chose.

Over the years the CBC has gradually reduced the number of private affiliates; until 2006 this usually involved either opening a new station (or new rebroadcast transmitters) in a market previously served by a private affiliate, or purchasing the affiliate outright. In most cases since 2006 (when CFJC-TV disaffiliated), it declined to open new rebroadcasters in the affected markets for budgetary reasons, and since then has wound down its remaining affiliation agreements, with the last expiring on August 31, 2016. These disaffiliations, along with the CBC's decision to shut down its TV rebroadcaster network in 2012, have significantly reduced the network's terrestrial coverage; however, under Canadian Radio-television and Telecommunications Commission (CRTC) regulations, all cable, satellite, and IPTV service providers are required to include a CBC Television signal in their basic service, even if one is not available terrestrially in the applicable service area.

From September 2014 to June 2026, all CBC Television O&Os were also separately affiliated with the temporary and (since April 2015) permanent part-time networks operated by Rogers Media for the purposes of distributing the Rogers-produced Hockey Night in Canada broadcasts. This was required by the CRTC as, under the arrangement for National Hockey League rights between Rogers and the CBC during this period, Rogers exercised editorial control and sold all advertising time during the HNIC broadcasts, even though for promotional purposes they were still treated as part of the CBC Television schedule. Although the CRTC decision which approved the permanent network only referred to stations owned by the CBC itself, CBC Television's private affiliates also continued to carry the Rogers-produced HNIC broadcasts until disaffiliation. With CBC ceasing to carry NHL games following the 2026 Stanley Cup Final, the part-time network licence was revoked by the CRTC, at Rogers' request, on July 21, 2026.

== See also ==
- List of Ici Radio-Canada Télé stations for stations owned by the CBC's French-language television network Ici Radio-Canada Télé
- List of assets owned by Canadian Broadcasting Corporation
- List of defunct CBC and Radio-Canada television transmitters - decommissioned on July 31, 2012
- CBUVT, a licensed but unbuilt CBC Television station in Victoria, British Columbia

== Notes ==
1. Two boldface asterisks appearing following a station's call letters (**) indicate a station that was built and signed on by the Canadian Broadcasting Corporation
2. Italicized channel numbers indicate a digital channel allocated for future use by the Canadian Radio-television and Telecommunications Commission.

== CBC owned-and-operated stations ==
City of license	Station	Channel TV (RF)	Year of affiliation	Owned since
Calgary, Alberta	**CBRT-DT****	9.1 (21)	1975	1975
Edmonton, Alberta	**CBXT-DT****	5.1 (42)	1961	1961
Vancouver, British Columbia	**CBUT-DT****	2.1 (43)	1953	1953
Winnipeg, Manitoba	**CBWT-DT****	6.1 (27)	1954	1954
Fredericton, New Brunswick	**CBAT-DT**	4.1 (31)	1954 (fmr.CHSJ-TV, Saint John)	1994
St. John's, Newfoundland and Labrador	**CBNT-DT****	8.1 (8)	1964	1964
Yellowknife, Northwest Territories	**CFYK-DT****	8.1 (8)	1967	1967
Halifax, Nova Scotia	**CBHT-DT****	3.1 (39)	1954	1954
Ottawa, Ontario	**CBOT-DT****	4.1 (25)	1953	1953
Toronto, Ontario	**CBLT-DT****	5.1 (20)	1952	1952
Windsor, Ontario	**CBET-DT**	9.1 (9)	1954	1975
Charlottetown, Prince Edward Island	**CBCT-DT**	13.1 (13)	1956	1968
Montreal, Quebec	**CBMT-DT****	6.1 (21)	1954	1954
Regina, Saskatchewan	**CBKT-DT**	9.1 (9)	1969 (previously with CBC from 1959 to 1962)	1969

== Former CBC-owned self-supporting stations ==
City of licence /Market	Station	Transitioned to rebroadcaster	Status
Grand Falls-Windsor, Newfoundland and Labrador	CBNAT 2	Unknown	Shut down on July 31, 2012, was operating as a rebroadcaster of CBNT
Labrador City, Newfoundland and Labrador	CBNLT 13	1991	Shut down on July 31, 2012, was a rebroadcaster of CBNT
Corner Brook, Newfoundland and Labrador	CBYT 5	2002	Shut down on July 31, 2012, was a retransmitter of CBNT
Kenora, Ontario	CBWAT 8	Unknown	Shut down on July 31, 2012, was operating as a retransmitter of CBWT
Goose Bay, Newfoundland and Labrador	CFLA-TV 8	1991	Shut down on July 31, 2012, was a retransmitter of CBNT
Saskatoon, Saskatchewan	CBKST 11	1971	Shut down on July 31, 2012, was a small analog semi-satellite of CBKT-DT
Schefferville, Quebec	CFKL-TV 8	1974	Shut down on July 31, 2012, was operating as CBMT repeater CBSET-1, receives signal from CBSET in Sept-Îles, itself a repeater of CBMT
Sydney, Nova Scotia	CBIT 5	1972	Shut down on July 31, 2012, was a small analog semi-satellite of CBHT-DT
Iqaluit, Nunavut	CFFB 8	Unknown	Shut down July 31, 2012
Whitehorse, Yukon	CFWH 6	Unknown	Shut down July 31, 2012
Inuvik, Northwest Territories	CHAK 6	Unknown	Shut down July 31, 2012

== Former affiliates ==
City	Station	Years of affiliation	New affiliation(s)	Current status
Barrie, Ontario	CKVR-TV 3	1955-1995	NewNet	Now a CTV Two O&O
Brandon, Manitoba	CKX-TV 5	1955-2009	none	Station permanently ceased operations in 2009; CBC no longer seen terrestrially
Calgary, Alberta	CICT-DT 2	1954-1975	Independent	Now a Global O&O
Cornwall, Ontario	CJSS-TV 8	1959-1963	CTV (repeater)	Purchased by CJOH-TV as its rebroadcaster for the CTV O&O (CJOH-TV-8)
Dawson Creek, British Columbia	CJDC-TV 5	1959–2016	CTV Two	Now a CTV Two O&O
Edmonton, Alberta	CFRN-TV 3	1954-1961	CTV	Now a CTV O&O
Hamilton, Ontario	CHCH-TV 11	1954-1961	Independent	Later operated as the flagship station of the CH / E! system from 2001 to 2009; now an independent station owned by Channel Zero
Kamloops, British Columbia	CFJC-TV 4	1957-2006	CH / E!	Now a Citytv affiliate owned by the Jim Pattison Group; CBC is no longer seen terrestrially in the market
Kelowna, British Columbia	CHBC-TV 2	1957-2006	CH / E!	Now a Global O&O
Kingston, Ontario	CKWS-TV 11	1954-2015	CTV	Became a CTV affiliate on August 31, 2015; now a Global O&O
Kitchener, Ontario	CKCO-TV 13	1954-1964	CTV	Now a CTV O&O
Lethbridge, Alberta	CISA-TV 7	1955-1975	Independent	Now a Global O&O
Lloydminster, Alberta/Saskatchewan	CKSA-DT 2.1	1960–2016	Global	Became a Citytv affiliate in December 2021; shut down 2025
London, Ontario	CFPL-TV 10	1953-1988	Independent	Later became part of BBS in 1992, then affiliated with NewNet (later A-Channel and A) after being sold to CHUM Limited in 1995; now a CTV Two O&O
Medicine Hat, Alberta	CHAT-TV 6	1957-2008	E!	Later became a Citytv affiliate; CBC is no longer seen terrestrially in the market Shut down in 2025.
Moncton, New Brunswick	CKCW-TV 2	1954-1969	CTV	Now a CTV O&O
North Bay, Ontario	CKNY-TV 10	1955-1971	CTV	Now a CTV O&O
Oshawa, Ontario	CHEX-TV-2 22	1992-2015	CTV	Semi-satellite of CHEX-TV. Became a CTV affiliate on August 31, 2015; now a Global O&O
Pembroke, Ontario	CHRO-TV 5	1961-1990	CTV	Later became affiliated with NewNet (later A-Channel and A) in 1995; now a CTV Two O&O
Peterborough, Ontario	CHEX-TV 12	1955-2015	CTV	Became a CTV affiliate on August 31, 2015; now a Global O&O
Prince George, British Columbia	CKPG-TV 2	1961-2008	E!	Now a City affiliate owned by the Jim Pattison Group; CBC no longer seen terrestrially in the market
Quebec City, Quebec	CKMI-TV 20	1957-1997	Global	Was on channel 5 at the time of affiliation; CKMI-TV moved from channel 5 to channel 20 in 1997, becoming a Global O&O; with channel 5 becoming a CBMT repeater, CBVE-TV, which would close down in 2012
Red Deer, Alberta	CHCA-TV 6	1957-2005	CH / E!	Closed in 2009 following shutdown of CH / E!
Regina, Saskatchewan	CKCK-TV 2	1954-1969	CTV	Now a CTV O&O
Saskatoon, Saskatchewan	CFQC-TV 8	1954-1971	CTV	Now a CTV O&O
St. John's, Newfoundland and Labrador	CJON-TV 6	1955-1964	CTV	Branded as NTV, the station currently carries select entertainment programming from Global and news programming from CTV
Sudbury, Ontario	CICI-TV 5	1953-1971	CTV	Now a CTV O&O
Sydney, Nova Scotia	CJCB-TV 4	1954-1972	CTV	Now a CTV O&O
Terrace, British Columbia	CFTK-TV 3	1962–2016	CTV Two	Now a CTV Two O&O
Thunder Bay, Ontario	CKPR-DT 2	1954-2014	CTV	Now a CTV affiliate owned by Dougall Media
Victoria, British Columbia	CHEK-TV 6	1956-1981	CTV (co-affiliated with CHAN-TV)^{1}	Later affiliated with CH / E! from 2001 to 2009; now an independent station owned by CHEK Media Group. For several years in the 2010s, CHEK simulcast CBUT's 6:00 p.m. news broadcast and shared news resources with CBC.
Wingham, Ontario	CKNX-TV 8	1955-1988	Independent	Later became part of BBS in the early 1990s, then affiliated with NewNet (later A-Channel and A) in 1998; closed in 2009 to become repeater of CTV Two O&O CFPL

^{1} - CHEK-TV carried an official secondary affiliation with CTV alongside CBC from 1963 until 1981.

== Affiliates later purchased by the CBC ==
City of license/market	Station	Year of purchase	Current status
Charlottetown, Prince Edward Island	CFCY-TV 13	1968	Became CBCT
North Bay, Ontario	CHNB-TV 4	2002	Became rebroadcaster of CBLT; shut down on July 31, 2012
Prince Albert, Saskatchewan	CKBI-TV 5	2002	Became rebroadcaster of CBKST; both shut down on July 31, 2012
Saint John, New Brunswick	CHSJ-TV 4	1994	Relocated to Fredericton and became CBAT-TV
Sault Ste. Marie, Ontario	CJIC-TV 5	2002	Became rebroadcaster of CBLT; shut down on July 31, 2012
Sudbury, Ontario	CKNC-TV 9	2002	Became rebroadcaster of CBLT; shut down on July 31, 2012
Swift Current, Saskatchewan	CJFB-TV 5	2002	Became rebroadcaster of CBKT; shut down on July 31, 2012
Timmins, Ontario	CFCL-TV 6	2002	Became rebroadcaster of CBLT; shut down on July 31, 2012
Windsor, Ontario	CKLW-TV 9	1975	Became CBET
Yorkton, Saskatchewan	CKOS-TV 5	2002	became rebroadcaster of CBKT; shut down on July 31, 2012
