= List of assets owned by the Canadian Broadcasting Corporation =

The following are lists of assets of the Canadian Broadcasting Corporation (French: Société Radio-Canada).

== Television ==
=== Conventional television ===
==== CBC Television ====
CBC owned-and-operated stations
City of license	Station	Channel TV (RF)	Year of affiliation	Owned since
Calgary, AB	CBRT-DT (Note: This station was built and signed on by the Canadian Broadcasting Corporation.)	9.1 (21)	1975	1975
Edmonton, AB	CBXT-DT	5.1 (42)	1961	1961
Vancouver, BC	CBUT-DT	2.1 (43)	1953	1953
Winnipeg, MB	CBWT-DT	6.1 (27)	1954	1954
Fredericton, NB	CBAT-DT	4.1 (31)	1954	1994
St. John's, NL	CBNT-DT	8.1 (8)	1964	1964
Yellowknife, NT (CBC North)	CFYK-DT	8.1 (8)	1967	1967
Halifax, NS	CBHT-DT	3.1 (39)	1954	1954
Ottawa, ON	CBOT-DT	4.1 (25)	1953	1953
Toronto, ON	CBLT-DT	5.1 (20)	1952	1952
Windsor, ON	CBET-DT	9.1 (9)	1954	1975
Charlottetown, PEI	CBCT-DT	13.1 (13)	1956	1968
Montreal, QC	CBMT-DT	6.1 (21)	1954	1954
Regina, SK	CBKT-DT	9.1 (9)	1969 (previously with CBC from 1959 to 1962)	1969

===== Former affiliates =====
City	Station	Years of affiliation	New affiliation(s)	Current status
Barrie, Ontario	CKVR-TV 3	1955-1995	NewNet	Now a CTV Two O&O
Brandon, Manitoba	CKX-TV 5	1955-2009	none	Station permanently ceased operations in 2009; CBC no longer seen terrestrially
Calgary, Alberta	CICT-DT 2	1954-1975	Independent	Now a Global O&O
Cornwall, Ontario	CJSS-TV 8	1959-1963	CTV (repeater)	Purchased by CJOH-TV as its rebroadcaster for the CTV O&O (CJOH-TV-8)
Dawson Creek, British Columbia	CJDC-TV 5	1959–2016	CTV Two	Now a CTV Two O&O
Edmonton, Alberta	CFRN-TV 3	1954-1961	CTV	Now a CTV O&O
Hamilton, Ontario	CHCH-TV 11	1954-1961	Independent	Later operated as the flagship station of the CH / E! system from 2001 to 2009; now an independent station owned by Channel Zero
Kamloops, British Columbia	CFJC-TV 4	1957-2006	CH / E!	Now a City affiliate owned by the Jim Pattison Group; CBC is no longer seen terrestrially in the market
Kelowna, British Columbia	CHBC-TV 2	1957-2006	CH / E!	Now a Global O&O
Kingston, Ontario	CKWS-TV 11	1954-2015	CTV	Became a CTV affiliate on August 31, 2015; now a Global O&O
Kitchener, Ontario	CKCO-TV 13	1954-1964	CTV	Now a CTV O&O
Lethbridge, Alberta	CISA-TV 7	1955-1975	Independent	Now a Global O&O
Lloydminster, Alberta/Saskatchewan	CKSA-DT 2.1	1960–2016	Global	Became a Citytv affiliate in December 2021
London, Ontario	CFPL-TV 10	1953-1988	Independent	Later became part of BBS in 1992, then affiliated with NewNet (later A-Channel and A) after being sold to CHUM Limited in 1995; now a CTV Two O&O
Medicine Hat, Alberta	CHAT-TV 6	1957-2008	E!	Now a City affiliate; CBC is no longer seen terrestrially in the market
Moncton, New Brunswick	CKCW-TV 2	1954-1969	CTV	Now a CTV O&O
North Bay, Ontario	CKNY-TV 10	1955-1971	CTV	Now a CTV O&O
Oshawa, Ontario	CHEX-TV-2 22	1992-2015	CTV	Semi-satellite of CHEX-TV. Became a CTV affiliate on August 31, 2015; now a Global O&O
Pembroke, Ontario	CHRO-TV 5	1961-1990	CTV	Later became affiliated with NewNet (later A-Channel and A) in 1995; now a CTV Two O&O
Peterborough, Ontario	CHEX-TV 12	1955-2015	CTV	Became a CTV affiliate on August 31, 2015; now a Global O&O
Prince George, British Columbia	CKPG-TV 2	1961-2008	E!	Now a City affiliate owned by the Jim Pattison Group; CBC no longer seen terrestrially in the market
Quebec City, Quebec	CKMI-TV 20	1957-1997	Global	Was on channel 5 at the time of affiliation; CKMI-TV moved from channel 5 to channel 20 in 1997, becoming a Global O&O; with channel 5 becoming a CBMT repeater, CBVE-TV, which would close down in 2012
Red Deer, Alberta	CHCA-TV 6	1957-2005	CH / E!	Closed in 2009 following shutdown of CH / E!
Regina, Saskatchewan	CKCK-TV 2	1954-1969	CTV	Now a CTV O&O
Saskatoon, Saskatchewan	CFQC-TV 8	1954-1971	CTV	Now a CTV O&O
St. John's, Newfoundland and Labrador	CJON-TV 6	1955-1964	CTV	Branded as NTV, the station currently carries select entertainment programming from Global and news programming from CTV
Sudbury, Ontario	CICI-TV 5	1953-1971	CTV	Now a CTV O&O
Sydney, Nova Scotia	CJCB-TV 4	1954-1972	CTV	Now a CTV O&O
Terrace, British Columbia	CFTK-TV 3	1962–2016	CTV Two	Now a CTV Two O&O
Thunder Bay, Ontario	CKPR-DT 2	1954-2014	CTV	Now a CTV affiliate owned by Dougall Media
Victoria, British Columbia	CHEK-TV 6	1956-1981	CTV (co-affiliated with CHAN-TV)^{1}	Later affiliated with CH / E! from 2001 to 2009; now an independent station owned by CHEK Media Group. For several years in the 2010s, CHEK simulcast CBUT's 6:00 p.m. news broadcast and shared news resources with CBC.
Wingham, Ontario	CKNX-TV 8	1955-1988	Independent	Later became part of BBS in the early 1990s, then affiliated with NewNet (later A-Channel and A) in 1998; closed in 2009 to become repeater of CTV Two O&O CFPL

^{1} - CHEK-TV carried an official secondary affiliation with CTV alongside CBC from 1963 until 1981.

==== Ici Radio-Canada Télé ====
Ici Radio-Canada owned-and-operated stations
City of license/market	Station	Channel TV (RF)	Year of affiliation	Owned since
Edmonton, AB	CBXFT-DT	11.1 (47)	1970	1970
Vancouver, BC	CBUFT-DT	26.1 (26)	1976	1976
Winnipeg, MB	CBWFT-DT	3.1 (51)	1960	1960
Moncton, NB	CBAFT-DT	11.1 (11)	1959	1959
Ottawa, ON	CBOFT-DT	9.1 (9)	1955	1955
Toronto, ON	CBLFT-DT	25.1 (25)	1973	1973
Montreal, QC	CBFT-DT	2.1 (19)	1952	1952
Quebec City, QC	CBVT-DT	11.1 (25)	1964	1964
Rimouski, QC	CJBR-DT	2.1 (45)	1954	1977
Saguenay, QC	CKTV-DT	12.1 (12)	1955	2008
Sherbrooke, QC	CKSH-DT	9.1 (9)	1974	2008
Trois-Rivières, QC	CKTM-DT	13.1 (28)	1958	2008
Regina, SK	CBKFT-DT	13.1 (13)	1976	1976

===== Former affiliates =====
Notes:

^{1} ) Also affiliated with the English CBC network, 1959-1968;
^{2} ) Also affiliated with the English CBC network, 1954-1957;
^{3} ) Also affiliated with the English CBC network, 1957-1962;
^{4} ) Affiliated with both CBC and Radio-Canada, 1956-1974; now TVA affiliate.
^{5} ) Affiliated with both CBC and Radio-Canada, 1956 until CBFOT (now CBLFT-3) established, which rebroadcasts CBLFT Toronto;

City	Station	Years of affiliation	Current status
Carleton, Quebec	CHAU-TV 5	1959-1983^{1}	Now a TVA affiliate
Quebec City, Quebec	CFCM-TV 4	1954-1964^{2}	Now a TVA affiliate
Rivière-du-Loup, Quebec	CKRT-DT 7	1962-2021	Ceased operations on August 31, 2021
Rouyn-Noranda, Quebec	CKRN-DT 9	1957-2018^{3}	Ceased operations on March 25, 2018
Sherbrooke, Quebec	CHLT-TV 7	1956-1974^{4}	Now a TVA affiliate
Timmins, Ontario	CFCL-TV 6	1960s^{5}	Sold to the CBC in 2002 by CTV, ceased operations as separate stations on October 27, 2002

=== Specialty cable channels ===
- CBC News Network
- Documentary Channel
- Ici ARTV
- Ici Explora
- Ici RDI
- Le Consortium de télévision Québec Canada (joint venture with Télé-Québec, TFO and Association des producteurs de films et de télévision du Québec)
  - TV5 Québec Canada
  - Unis

== Radio ==
=== Conventional radio ===
==== CBC Radio One ====
CBC Radio One owned-and-operated stations:

- Calgary, Alberta - CBR
- Charlottetown, Prince Edward Island - CBCT-FM
- Corner Brook, Newfoundland and Labrador - CBY
- Edmonton, Alberta - CBX
- Fredericton, New Brunswick - CBZF-FM
- Gander, Newfoundland and Labrador - CBG
- Goose Bay, Newfoundland and Labrador - CFGB-FM
- Grand Falls-Windsor, Newfoundland and Labrador - CBT
- Halifax, Nova Scotia - CBHA-FM
- Inuvik, Northwest Territories - CHAK
- Iqaluit, Nunavut - CFFB
- Kelowna, British Columbia - CBTK-FM
- Kitchener, Ontario - CBLA-FM-2
- La Ronge, Saskatchewan - CBKA-FM
- Moncton, New Brunswick - CBAM-FM
- Montreal, Quebec - CBME-FM
- Ottawa, Ontario - CBO-FM
- Prince George, British Columbia - CBYG-FM
- Prince Rupert, British Columbia - CFPR
- Quebec City, Quebec - CBVE-FM
- Regina, Saskatchewan - CBK
- Saint John, New Brunswick - CBD-FM
- St. John's, Newfoundland and Labrador - CBN
- Sudbury, Ontario - CBCS-FM
- Sydney, Nova Scotia - CBI
- Thompson, Manitoba - CBWK-FM
- Thunder Bay, Ontario - CBQT-FM
- Toronto, Ontario - CBLA-FM
- Vancouver, British Columbia - CBU
- Victoria, British Columbia - CBCV-FM
- Whitehorse, Yukon - CFWH
- Windsor, Ontario - CBEW-FM
- Winnipeg, Manitoba - CBW
- Yellowknife, Northwest Territories - CFYK

==== Ici Radio-Canada Première ====
Ici Radio-Canada Première owned-and-operated stations:

- Charlottetown - CBAF-FM-15, 88.1 FM
- Edmonton - CHFA-FM, 90.1 AM
- Halifax - CBAF-FM-5, 92.3 FM
- Matane - CBGA-FM, 102.1 FM
- Moncton - CBAF-FM, 88.5 FM
- Montreal - CBF-FM, 95.1 FM
- Ottawa - CBOF-FM, 90.7 FM
- Quebec City - CBV-FM, 106.3 FM
- Regina - CBKF-FM 97.7 FM
- Rimouski - CJBR-FM, 89.1 FM
- Rouyn-Noranda - CHLM-FM, 90.7 FM
- Saguenay - CBJ-FM, 93.7 FM
- Sept-Îles - CBSI-FM, 98.1 FM
- Sherbrooke - CBF-FM-10, 101.1 FM
- Saint Boniface (Winnipeg) - CKSB-10-FM, 1050 AM, 90.5 FM
- Sudbury - CBON-FM, 98.1 FM
- Toronto - CJBC, 860 AM
- Trois-Rivières - CBF-FM-8, 96.5 FM
- Vancouver - CBUF-FM, 97.7 FM
- Windsor - CBEF, 1550 AM

==== CBC Music and Ici Musique ====
Stations owned-and-operated by CBC Music or Ici Musique
City	CBC Music	Ici Musique
Calgary	CBR-FM	CBCX-FM, 90.1
Edmonton	CBX-FM	
Halifax	CBH-FM	CBAX-FM, 91.5
Moncton		CBAL-FM, 98.3
Montreal	CBM-FM	CBFX-FM, 100.7
Ottawa	CBOQ-FM	CBOX-FM, 102.5
Quebec City		CBVX-FM, 95.3
Regina	CBK-FM	
Rimouski		CBRX-FM, 101.5
Saguenay		CBJX-FM, 100.9
St. John's	CBN-FM	
Sudbury	CBBS-FM	CBBX-FM, 90.9
Sydney	CBI-FM	
Thunder Bay	CBQ-FM	
Toronto	CBL-FM	CJBC-FM, 90.3
Vancouver	CBU-FM	CBUX-FM, 90.9
Windsor	CBE-FM	
Winnipeg	CBW-FM	CKSB-FM, 89.9

=== Satellite radio ===
The CBC used to own a 40% stake in SiriusXM Canada until 2017.

CBC-owned Sirius radio stations:

- CBC Radio One — a simulcast of the radio network with local content replaced with national content
- CBC Radio 3 — a simulcast of the internet radio service
- Première Plus — a simulcast of the Première Chaîne radio network with local content replaced with national content
- Bande à part — a simulcast of the internet radio service
- Sports extra
- RCI Plus — a simulcast of the Radio Canada International radio broadcasting service

=== Other radio ===
- CBC Radio 3
- Espace Classique — French-language internet radio service that airs classical music
- Espace Jazz — French-language internet radio service that airs jazz
- Radio Canada International
- Weatheradio Canada

== Online ==
- CBC.ca
- CBC Hamilton
- Radio-Canada.ca
- Ici TOU.TV
- CBC Corporate website
- All websites associated with the properties listed on this page

== Film production ==
CBC Films is the film finance and production arm of the Canadian Broadcasting Corporation, focusing mostly on films by female, LGBT, indigenous, and diverse Canadian filmmakers. Its initiatives include funding, pre-buys, and acquisitions for CBC broadcast and streaming platforms.

== Mobile Production ==
- Video and Audio

== Record Label ==
- CBC Records

== Facilities ==
CBC-owned buildings include:

- CBC Regional Broadcast Centre Vancouver
- Canadian Broadcasting Centre (Toronto)
  - Glenn Gould Studio
- Maison Radio-Canada (Montreal)

The CBC Ottawa Production Centre is not owned by CBC, but rather leased from Morguard Investments.

Former CBC facilities and structures include:

- CBC Jarvis Street Tower (Toronto)
- CBC Museum (Toronto)
- CBC Tower (Mont-Carmel)
- CBC Radio Building (Halifax)
- Château Laurier (office space; Ottawa)
- 1500 Bronson Avenue (Ottawa)
- Hutchinson Building (Saskatoon)
- Victoria Building (Ottawa)

== Services and platforms ==
English–French equivalent services
Type	Platform/service	
Type	CBC (English)	Radio-Canada (French)
online service	CBC.ca CBC's main online service, providing news and information, audio and video streaming, sports highlights, web-only interactive features, multimedia archives, among other things.	Radio-Canada.ca Radio-Canada's main online service, providing news and information, audio and video streaming, sports highlights, web-only interactive features, multimedia archives, among other things.
television network	CBC Television CBC's main television network, providing news, information, sports, and entertainment.	Ici Radio-Canada Télé Radio-Canada's main television programming, offering news, entertainment, drama series, and current affairs.
news- and talk-radio network	CBC Radio One CBC's main radio network for news (local, national and international), documentaries, and current-affairs and arts programming	Ici Radio-Canada Première Radio-Canada's main talk radio focused on news and current affairs, the arts, and social issues.
cable news channel	CBC News Network 24/7 breaking news, live-event coverage, in-depth news, and current affairs programming.	Ici RDI 24/7 breaking news and information, live-event coverage, in-depth news, and current affairs programming.
audio streaming service	CBC Listen includes content from CBC Radio; CBC Music, including over 200 free, curated playlists; and CBC Podcasts (CBC’s full podcast catalogue); as well as the ability to listen to CBC Radio One and CBC Music radio shows live, with select shows on-demand.	Radio-Canada OHdio includes all audio content from Ici Première and Ici Musique, available for streaming both live and on-demand.
video-on-demand	CBC Gem original and acquired scripted and unscripted programming in "all genres for all audiences," as well as feature-length films via Telefilm Canada.	Ici TOU.TV French-language online television site offering TV programs, series, variety shows, documentaries, and news magazines.
music station and service	CBC Music English-language music radio station and free online music service	Ici Musique French-language music radio station and free online music service
children's programming	CBC Kids commercial-free content—including news, videos, and games—for children and youth, available on CBC TV in the mornings; online at cbckids.ca; and on YouTube.	Zone Jeunesse available on Ici Radio-Canada Télé in the mornings; online; and on YouTube.

Other services
Platform/service	Type	Description
CBC/Radio-Canada (English and French)
CBC Archives	news archives	
CBC North	radio and television network	radio and television services for Canada's Northern communities, in English, French, and 8 Indigenous languages.
CBC Sports	sports broadcasting	includes Canadian and international sports news and special reports, as well as live streaming of major sporting events.
CBC/Radio-Canada Olympics	broadcasting	Canada’s official broadcasting for the Olympic Games—including Tokyo in 2020, Beijing in 2022, and Paris in 2024.
Curio.ca	educational streaming service	subscription-based educational content from CBC and Radio-Canada, including documentaries, news, archival material, stock photography, etc.
Mauril	language-learning platform	free educational content for learning English or French.
Radio Canada International (RCI)	specialty channel	information and cultural programs in 7 different languages.
CBC (English)
documentary Channel	digital television station	feature-length documentary films
CBCBooks	online service	literary content from across CBC's platforms.
CBC News Explore	FAST channel	24/7 news channel
CBC News BC	FAST channel	24/7 regional news channel focused on British Columbia
CBC Comedy	FAST channel	24/7 comedy channel
Radio-Canada (French)
Espaces autochtones	online news	Indigenous news, with a focus on the "challenges, achievements and history of Indigenous communities."
Ici ARTV	specialty channel	French-language cultural content, including arts programming, as well as popular entertainment.
Ici Explora	specialty channel	French-language content focusing on science, the environment, nature, and health.
Mordu	culinary website	French-language cooking and food platform that brings together all culinary content from across Radio-Canada's platforms, offering over 3,000 recipes along with stories, professional tips, local food news, and exclusive digital originals.
Rad	interactive news service	"Radio-Canada’s journalism laboratory," experimenting with new information content formats.
