= CBC Saskatoon =

CBC Saskatoon may refer to CBC Saskatoon and SRC Saskatoon stations.

CBC Saskatoon refers to:

- CBK-1-FM, CBC Radio One on 94.1 FM, rebroadcasts CBK
- CBKS-FM, CBC Radio 2 on 105.5 FM, rebroadcasts CBK-FM
- CBKST, CBC Television on channel 11

SRC Saskatoon refers to:

- CBKF-2, Première Chaîne on 860 AM, rebroadcasts CBKF-FM
- CKSB-2, Espace Musique on 88.7 FM, rebroadcasts CKSB-FM
- CBKFT-1, Télévision de Radio-Canada on channel 13, rebroadcasts CBKFT
