= 1969 in Canadian television =

The following is a list of events affecting Canadian television in 1969. Events listed include television show debuts, finales, cancellations, and channel launches, closures and rebrandings.

== Events ==
Date	Event
May 2	CKCW-TV Moncton switches networks from CBC to CTV.
May 2	Telesat is founded in Ottawa.
June 20	Don Messer's Jubilee is cancelled. The cancellation is so controversial it is brought up in the House of Commons.
September 13	CKCK-TV and CHRE-TV in Regina switch networks as CKCK goes to CTV while CHRE (bought by the CBC and renamed CBKRT, now CBKT-DT) switches to CBC
October 4	The 1969 Canadian Film Awards.

=== Debuts ===
Show	Station	Premiere Date
Strategy	CBC Television	April 1
It's Our Stuff	CBC Television	June 30
Strange Paradise	CBC Television	October 20

=== Ending this year ===
Show	Station	Cancelled
Magistrate's Court	CTV	January 20
Perry's Probe	CTV	January 20
Rocket Robin Hood	Broadcast syndication	January 20
Quentin Durgens, M.P.	CBC Television	February 4
Don Messer's Jubilee	CBC Television	June 20
Strategy	CBC Television	October 7
Toby	CBC Television	Unknown

== Television shows ==
=== 1950s ===
- Country Canada (1954–2007)
- CBC News Magazine (1952–1981)
- Chez Hélène (1959–1973)
- Circle 8 Ranch (1955–1978)
- The Friendly Giant (1958–1985)
- Hockey Night in Canada (1952–present)
- The National (1954–present)
- Front Page Challenge (1957–1995)
- Wayne and Shuster Show (1958–1989)

=== 1960s ===
- Audubon Wildlife Theatre (1968–1974)
- CTV National News (1961–present)
- Elwood Glover's Luncheon Date (1963–1975)
- The Galloping Gourmet (1968–1972)
- Land and Sea (1964–present)
- Man Alive (1967–2000)
- Mr. Dressup (1967–1996)
- Music Hop (1962–1972)
- The Nature of Things (1960–present, scientific documentary series)
- People in Conflict (1962–1970)
- The Pierre Berton Show (1962–1973)
- The Pig and Whistle (1967–1977)
- Question Period (1967–present, news program)
- Reach for the Top (1961–1985)
- Singalong Jubilee (1961–1974)
- Take 30 (1962–1983)
- Telescope (1963–1973)
- The Tommy Hunter Show (1965–1992)
- University of the Air (1966–1983)
- W-FIVE (1966–present, newsmagazine program)

== Television stations ==
=== Debuts ===
Date	Market	Station	Channel	Affiliation	Notes/References
August 22	Inuvik, Northwest Territories	CHAK-TV	6	CBC Television	
September 21	Saint John, New Brunswick	CKLT-TV	9	CTV	Satellite of CKCW/Moncton
Unknown	Montreal, Quebec	Concordia University Television	(cable-only)	Educational-access independent	Oldest student-run television station in Canada

=== Network affiliation changes ===
Date	Market	Station	Channel	Old affiliation	New affiliation	Source
May 2	Moncton, New Brunswick	CKCW-TV	29	CBC Television	CTV Television Network	
September 13	Regina, Saskatchewan	CKCK-TV	2	CBC Television	CTV Television Network	
September 13	Regina, Saskatchewan	CHRE-TV	4	CTV	CBC	

== Births ==
Date	Name	Notability
August 10	Charlene Aleck	Actress (The Beachcombers)

== See also ==
- 1969 in Canada
- List of Canadian films
