= List of Ici Radio-Canada Télé stations =

Ici Radio-Canada Télé operates as a Canadian French language television network owned by the Canadian Broadcasting Corporation (known in French as Société Radio-Canada) made up of thirteen owned-and-operated stations and seven private affiliates. This is a table listing of Radio-Canada affiliates, with stations owned by Radio-Canada separated from privately owned affiliates, and arranged by market. This article also includes former self-supporting stations currently operating as rebroadcasters of regional affiliates, stations no longer affiliated with Télévision de Radio-Canada and stations purchased by the CBC that formerly operated as private Radio-Canada affiliates.

The station's advertised channel number follows the call letters; in most cases, this is their over-the-air broadcast frequency. The number in parentheses which follows a virtual channel number is the station's actual digital channel number, digital channels allocated for future use listed in parentheses are italicized.

Note:

1. Two boldface asterisks appearing following a station's call letters (**) indicate a Radio-Canada station that was built and signed-on by the Canadian Broadcasting Corporation.

== Ici Radio-Canada Télé owned-and-operated stations ==
City of license/market	Station	Channel TV (RF)	Year of affiliation	Owned since	ICI Branding
Edmonton, Alberta	**CBXFT-DT****	11.1 (47)	1970	1970	Alberta
Vancouver, British Columbia	**CBUFT-DT****	26.1 (26)	1976	1976	Colombie-Britannique
Winnipeg, Manitoba	**CBWFT-DT****	3.1 (51)	1960	1960	Manitoba
Moncton, New Brunswick	**CBAFT-DT****	11.1 (11)	1959	1959	Acadie
Ottawa, Ontario	**CBOFT-DT****	9.1 (9)	1955	1955	Ottawa–Gatineau
Toronto, Ontario	**CBLFT-DT****	25.1 (25)	1973	1973	Ontario
Montreal, Quebec	**CBFT-DT****	2.1 (19)	1952	1952	Grand Montréal
Quebec City, Quebec	**CBVT-DT****	11.1 (25)	1964	1964	Québec
Rimouski, Quebec	**CJBR-DT**	2.1 (45)	1954	1977	Est du Québec
Saguenay, Quebec	**CKTV-DT**	12.1 (12)	1955	2008	Saguenay–Lac-Saint-Jean
Sherbrooke, Quebec	**CKSH-DT**	9.1 (9)	1974	2008	Estrie
Trois-Rivières, Quebec	**CKTM-DT**	13.1 (28)	1958	2008	Mauricie–Centre-du-Québec
Regina, Saskatchewan	**CBKFT-DT****	13.1 (13)	1976	1976	Saskatchewan

== Former Radio-Canada-owned self-supporting stations ==
City of license/Market	Station	Transitioned to rebroadcaster	Current status
Sept-Îles, Quebec	**CBST 13**	1991	Became retransmitter of CBVT, then analogue rebroadcaster of CJBR-DT; shut down on July 31, 2012
Windsor, Ontario	**CBEFT 54**	c. 1996	Became retransmitter of CBOFT, then analogue rebroadcaster of CBLFT-DT on channel 35; shut down on July 31, 2012

== Former affiliates ==
Notes:

^{1} ) Also affiliated with the English CBC network, 1959-1968;
^{2} ) Also affiliated with the English CBC network, 1954-1957;
^{3} ) Also affiliated with the English CBC network, 1957-1962;
^{4} ) Affiliated with both CBC and Radio-Canada, 1956-1974; now TVA affiliate.
^{5} ) Affiliated with both CBC and Radio-Canada, 1956 until CBFOT (now CBLFT-3) established, which rebroadcasts CBLFT Toronto;

City	Station	Years of affiliation	Current status
Carleton, Quebec	CHAU-TV 5	1959-1983^{1}	Now a TVA affiliate
Quebec City, Quebec	CFCM-TV 4	1954-1964^{2}	Now a TVA affiliate
Rivière-du-Loup, Quebec	CKRT-DT 7	1962-2021	Ceased operations on August 31, 2021
Rouyn-Noranda, Quebec	CKRN-DT 9	1957-2018^{3}	Ceased operations on March 25, 2018
Sherbrooke, Quebec	CHLT-TV 7	1956-1974^{4}	Now a TVA affiliate
Timmins, Ontario	CFCL-TV 6	1960s^{5}	Sold to the CBC in 2002 by CTV, ceased operations as separate stations on October 27, 2002

== Affiliates later purchased by Radio-Canada ==
City of license/market	Station	Year of purchase	Current status
Matane, Quebec	**CKBL 9**	1972	Became **CBGAT**, now a rebroadcaster of CBVT-DT on channel 6
Rimouski, Quebec	**CJBR-TV 3**	1977	Now a full-time station once again, on channel 2
Saguenay, Quebec	**CKTV 12**	2008	
Sherbrooke, Quebec	**CKSH 9**	2008	
Trois-Rivières, Quebec	**CKTM 13**	2008	

== See also ==
- List of CBC television stations for stations affiliated with or owned by the CBC's English-language television network CBC Television
- List of assets owned by Canadian Broadcasting Corporation
- List of defunct CBC and Radio-Canada television transmitters - decommissioned on July 31, 2012
