= CHAB =

CHAB may refer to:

- CHAB (AM), a radio station (800 AM) licensed to Moose Jaw, Saskatchewan, Canada
- CHAB-TV, a defunct television station in Moose Jaw, Saskatchewan, Canada
