= Edward Rawlinson =

Canadian businessman

Edward A. Rawlinson

Edward A. Rawlinson, SOM (1912–1992) was a Canadian businessman. Born in Qu'Appelle, Saskatchewan, Rawlinson became the youngest chartered accountant in Canada in 1934. During the Second World War he was manager of British Commonwealth Air Training Plan flying school in Prince Albert.

In 1946 Rawlinson bought CKBI radio station in Prince Albert and in 1958 he established CKBI-TV. He subsequently acquired radio stations in a number of other centres in Saskatchewan including Regina, Saskatoon, North Battleford and Meadow Lake. Rawlinson was president of Central Broadcasting and chairman of Rawlco Communications. He was a fellow of the Canadian Institute of Chartered Accountants.

Rawlinson was recognized across Canada for his leadership in broadcasting. Past president and honorary life member of the Western Association of Broadcasters, he was also a former director of the Canadian Association of Broadcasters and a member of its hall of fame.

Among his many awards Rawlinson received the Rogers Family Award for excellence in broadcasting in 1989. He was also well known for service to the community; he was chairman of the board of Victoria Union Hospital in Prince Albert and active in the Anglican Diocese of Saskatchewan, Prince Albert Chamber of Commerce (of which he was a Life Member), and the University of Saskatchewan Board of Governors. In 1989 Rawlinson was the recipient of the Saskatchewan Order of Merit.
