= CICC-DT =

Television station in Yorkton

Semi-satellite of CKCK-DT, Regina, Saskatchewan
- Yorkton, Saskatchewan; Canada
- Channels: Digital: 10 (VHF)
- Branding: CTV Yorkton (general); CTV News Yorkton (local newscasts)

Programming
- Affiliations: CTV

Ownership
- Owner: Bell Media Inc.

History
- First air date: September 6, 1971
- Former call signs: CICC-TV (1971–2023)
- Former channel numbers: Analog: 10 (VHF, 1971–2023)

Technical information
- Licensing authority: CRTC
- ERP: 2 kW
- HAAT: 136 m (446 ft)
- Transmitter coordinates: 51°12′33.12″N 102°44′2.4″W

Links
- Website: CTV Yorkton; CTV Regina

CICC's former logo (1998–2001)

CICC-DT (channel 10, cable channel 7) is a television station in Yorkton, Saskatchewan, Canada, owned and operated by the CTV Television Network, a division of Bell Media. The station's studios are located on Broadway Street East and 6 Avenue North in Yorkton, and its transmitter is adjacent to Highway 52, west of the city.

CICC-DT operates as a semi-satellite of CKCK-DT in Regina, running the same programming as that station at all times (except for certain commercials and a separate 5 p.m. newscast).

== History ==
CICC signed on for the first time on Labour Day 1971, owned by Yorkton Television along with CKOS-TV. In 1984, it became a sister station to Prince Albert's CBC affiliate, CKBI-TV. Baton Broadcasting acquired it in 1986 as part of its merger with Yorkton Television. When Baton bought controlling interest in CTV in 1996, CICC became the network's second-smallest O&O.

In 2002, CTV parent company Bell Globemedia (now Bell Media) sold CICC's former CBC-affiliated twinstick sister station, CKOS-TV, to the CBC, which then made CKOS a rebroadcaster of CBKT in Regina. CBC shut down the transmitter in 2012, leaving CICC as the only over-the-air television station in Yorkton.

In November 2023, the station launched its digital signal.

== News programming ==
As of February 12, 2024, its only local newscast is CTV News at Five, anchored by Lee Jones from the CTV Regina studios with reporters filing stories from Yorkton. It otherwise simulcasts all of CTV Regina's news programming.

=== Notable former on-air staff ===
- Rob Brown
- Robin Gill
- Natasha Staniszewski

== Former transmitters ==
- CICC-TV-2 Norquay
- CICC-TV-3 Hudson Bay (Note: CICC-TV-3 was among a long list of CTV rebroadcasters nationwide to have shut down on or before August 31, 2009, as part of a political dispute with Canadian authorities on paid fee-for-carriage requirements for cable television operators. A subsequent change in ownership assigned full control of CTVglobemedia to Bell Canada; as of 2011, these transmitters remained in normal licensed broadcast operation. Another transmitter that rebroadcast CICC-TV, CIWH-TV-1 channel 32 of Humboldt, was also on that list; that transmitter closed in late 2010.)
- CIEW-TV Carlyle Lake
- CIWH-TV Wynyard

Notes

On February 11, 2016, Bell Media applied for its regular license renewals, which included applications to delete a long list of transmitters, including all of CICC's rebroadcasters. Bell Media's rationale for deleting these analog repeaters is below:

We are electing to delete these analog transmitters from the main licence with which they are associated. These analog transmitters generate no incremental revenue, attract little to no viewership given the growth of BDU or DTH subscriptions and are costly to maintain, repair or replace. In addition, none of the highlighted transmitters offer any programming that differs from the main channels. The Commission has determined that broadcasters may elect to shut down transmitters but will lose certain regulatory privileges (distribution on the basic service, the ability to request simultaneous substitution) as noted in Broadcasting Regulatory Policy CRTC 2015-24, Over-the-air transmission of television signals and local programming. We are fully aware of the loss of these regulatory privileges as a result of any transmitter shutdown.
