= 1968 in Canadian television =

The following is a list of events affecting Canadian television in 1968. Events listed include television show debuts, finales, cancellations, and channel launches, closures and rebrandings.

== Events ==
Date	Event
June 9	The first leaders' debate airs during the 1968 Election.
October 4	The 1968 Canadian Film Awards.
November 26	CFWH-TV goes on the air as the second TV station in Northern Canada.

=== Debuts ===
Show	Station	Premiere Date
Bye Bye	Radio-Canada	April 15
Fanfreluche	Radio-Canada	April 15
The Galloping Gourmet	CBC Television	April 15
Audubon Wildlife Theatre	CBC Television	April 15
Toby	CBC Television	October 4

=== Ending this year ===
Show	Station	Cancelled
Wojeck	CBC Television	March 12
O'Keefe Centre Presents	CBC Television	March 24
Flashbook	CBC Television	June 16
Let's Go	CBC Television	June 26

== Television shows ==
=== 1950s ===
- Country Canada (1954–2007)
- CBC News Magazine (1952–1981)
- Chez Hélène (1959–1973)
- Circle 8 Ranch (1955–1978)
- Don Messer's Jubilee (1957–1969)
- The Friendly Giant (1958–1985)
- Hockey Night in Canada (1952–present)
- The National (1954–present)
- Front Page Challenge (1957–1995)
- Wayne and Shuster Show (1958–1989)

=== 1960s ===
- CTV National News (1961–present)
- Elwood Glover's Luncheon Date (1963–1975)
- Land and Sea (1964–present)
- Magistrate's Court (1963–1969)
- Man Alive (1967–2000)
- Mr. Dressup (1967–1996)
- Music Hop (1962–1972)
- The Nature of Things (1960–present, scientific documentary series)
- People in Conflict (1962–1970)
- The Pierre Berton Show (1962–1973)
- The Pig and Whistle (1967–1977)
- Quentin Durgens, M.P. (1965–1969)
- Question Period (1967–present, news program)
- Reach for the Top (1961–1985)
- Rocket Robin Hood (1966–1969)
- Singalong Jubilee (1961–1974)
- Take 30 (1962–1983)
- Telescope (1963–1973)
- The Tommy Hunter Show (1965–1992)
- University of the Air (1966–1983)
- W-FIVE (1966–present, newsmagazine program)

== Television stations ==
=== Debuts ===
Date	Market	Station	Channel	Affiliation	Notes/References
November 26	Whitehorse, Yukon	CFWH-TV	6	CBC Television (O&O)	

== Births ==
Date	Name	Notability
April 20	Jo Vannicola	Actor

== See also ==
- 1968 in Canada
- List of Canadian films
