= CJFB-TV =

Television station in Swift Current (1957–2002)

Swift Current, Saskatchewan; Canada
- Channels: Analog: 5 (VHF)

Programming
- Affiliations: CBC

Ownership
- Owner: Swift Current Telecasting

History
- First air date: December 23, 1957
- Last air date: May 31, 2002
- Call sign meaning: Julie Forst Broadcasting

Technical information
- ERP: 13.3 kW
- HAAT: 155.8 m (511 ft)
- Transmitter coordinates: 50°20′18″N 107°47′26″W
- Translator(s): see § Transmitters

CJFB-TV (channel 5) was a television station in Swift Current, Saskatchewan, Canada. The station was in operation from 1957 to 2002 as a private affiliate of CBC Television.

== History ==
The station signed on the air on December 23, 1957, beginning its schedule at 6 p.m., as a Christmas present to southern Saskatchewan. From start to finish, it was owned by Bill and Julie Forst and their company, Swift Current Telecasting.

Many baby boomers fondly remember Uncle Gord's Cartoon Party which was broadcast in the 1960s and early 1970s. Hosted by longtime CJFB on-air personality Gordon Foth, the program was broadcast at noon on weekdays and featured cartoons such as Popeye which were elderly even then. However, in the one-channel environment of Southwestern Saskatchewan, the program was enjoyed by many school-aged children at home for lunch.

In 1958 a weekly live television program reporting developments in agriculture, called Farming Today, was sponsored jointly by the Swift Current Research Station, the Swift Current Agricultural and Exhibition Association, and CJFB. The program was hosted by research station personnel and/or the local provincial agricultural representative. Research Station Staff involved in the program included: Baden Campbell, Peder Myhr and Mark Kilcher. Farming Today lasted for 25 years.

In 1976, after fighting an application by Regina's CKCK-TV to extend CTV service to Swift Current, CJFB agreed to a protective arrangement which allowed it to delete local advertising from the CKCK signal.

Towards the end of its life, the station also carried programming from Global, similar to CKRD-TV, and had produced one season of an agriculture series called Agribiz before the series relocated to Regina.

The Forsts did not have the resources to convert the station to digital, and opted to sell CJFB to the CBC in 2002. On May 31, CJFB signed off for the final time with a look back at the station's history. The next day, the station's main transmitter became CBKT-4, a semi-satellite of Regina's CBKT, providing a full CBC schedule to the area. CJFB-TV-1 (Channel 2) in Eastend and CJFB-TV-2 (Channel 2) in Val Marie were deleted, as they were in range of two existing CBKT rebroadcasters, CBCP-TV-1 (channel 7) in Shaunavon and CBCP-TV-3 (channel 3) in Ponteix, respectively. CITV-TV provides Global programming via local cable systems. CJFB's demise marked it the first television station in Canada to cease operations since 1991, and also the first television station of the 2000s in Canada to cease operations. CBC affiliates CKOS-TV in Yorkton and CKBI-TV in Prince Albert would also be sold to the CBC in 2002, also becoming CBKT semi-satellites. CBKT-4 was among 620 rebroadcasters closed down by the CBC on July 31, 2012, due to budget cuts affecting the network.

== Transmitters ==
- CBCP-TV-1 7 Shaunavon
- CBCP-TV-2 2 Cypress Hills/Eastend/Val Marie
- CBCP-TV-3 3 Ponteix
- CBKT-5 10 Riverhurst
