= Strategy (game show) =

- Genre: Game Show
- Created by: Robert F. Aaron
- Presented by: Alex Trebek
- Narrated by: Jay Nelson
- Country of origin: Canada
- Original language: English
- No. of seasons: 1

Production
- Producer: Sidney M. Cohen
- Running time: 30 minutes

Original release
- Network: CBC Television
- Release: 1 April – 7 October 1969

Strategy is a Canadian game show that aired on CBC Television in 1969, with Alex Trebek as host, accompanied by announcer Jay Nelson and model Dee Myles. The half-hour program was broadcast weekdays at 2:00 p.m. (Eastern time) from 1 April to 7 October 1969.

== Premise ==
Contestants consisted of teams of couples who were situated on a large circular maze covering the studio floor. Their goal was to move towards the centre of the maze by correctly answering questions during their turns. Contestants could be set back by their opponents by being blocked or by landing on booby traps which were secretly laid on the maze. Couples won by reaching the centre of the maze or by being the closest to the centre at the end of the program time. Winning contestants did not return for successive episodes, in contrast with typical American game show practice, nor did winners return for a later championship series.

Part of the strategy of the game involved deciding where and when to place blocks or booby traps. Time was limited for each step towards the centre of the maze. This was exciting for the contestants, but perhaps less so for the television viewer, who could not observe the alternatives considered by the contestants.

Substantial prizes such as furniture and appliances were awarded, which were unusually generous by Canadian game show standards.
