= CKCK-DT =

Television station in Regina, Saskatchewan

- Regina, Saskatchewan; Canada
- Channels: Digital: 8 (VHF); Virtual: 2
- Branding: CTV Regina (general); CTV News Regina (newscasts)

Programming
- Affiliations: CTV

Ownership
- Owner: Bell Media Inc.
- Sister stations: CHBD-FM

History
- First air date: July 28, 1954
- Former call signs: CKCK-TV (1954–2011)
- Former channel numbers: Analog: 2 (VHF, 1954–2011)
- Former affiliations: CBC (1954–1969); CBS (secondary, 1954–1970)
- Call sign meaning: from former sister radio station CKCK (AM)

Technical information
- Licensing authority: CRTC
- ERP: 23 kW
- HAAT: 187.2 m (614 ft)
- Transmitter coordinates: 50°26′59″N 104°30′4″W
- Translator(s): see § Transmitters

Links
- Website: CTV Regina

CKCK-DT (channel 2, cable channel 6) is a television station in Regina, Saskatchewan, Canada, owned and operated by the CTV Television Network, a division of Bell Media. The station's studios and transmitter facilities are located on Eastgate Drive and Highway 1, just east of Regina proper.

Master control facilities are located at the studios of CFCN-DT in Calgary, shared with eight other CTV owned-and-operated stations in British Columbia, Alberta and Saskatchewan.

== History ==
CKCK first signed on the air on July 28, 1954, as the first privately owned television station in Western Canada. It was originally owned by the Sifton family, which also owned the Regina Leader-Post and CKCK radio. It was originally a CBC Television affiliate. Shortly after signing on, it took a secondary affiliation with American broadcast network CBS. In 1962, as part of a deal that allowed CTV to come to Saskatchewan, CKCK opened a rebroadcaster in Moose Jaw. In return, Moose Jaw's original station, CHAB-TV, switched to CTV and opened a semi-satellite in Regina, CHRE-TV. The station swapped affiliations with CHAB/CHRE and joined CTV when the latter stations were purchased by the CBC in 1969. As a result of this deal, CHRE changed its call letters to CBKRT and became the main station; it is now CBKT.

CKCK-TV's logo in the 1980s, as "CKTV".

In 1977, CKCK was sold to Harvard Developments, owned by Regina's Hill family. In 1985, Baton Broadcasting acquired a 90 percent stake in the station (the remaining 10 percent would soon follow), bringing it under common ownership with CTV's other Saskatchewan affiliates—CFQC in Saskatoon, CICC in Yorkton, and CIPA in Prince Albert. In 1987, these stations and Baton's two privately owned CBC affiliates in Saskatchewan, CKOS in Yorkton and CKBI in Prince Albert, began branding as the "Saskatchewan Television Network", which linked up with Baton's Ontario stations as the Baton Broadcast System in 1994.

Following Baton's acquisition of CTV in 1997, CKCK became a CTV owned-and-operated station. Local programming today is limited primarily to the station's popular newscasts.

CKCK-TV's logo as a CTV affiliate (1997–2001)

From the 1970s through the late 1980s, CKCK branded itself as "CKTV", but its official call letters remained CKCK-TV. During this period, though, the station did acquire the CKTV calls for its Fort Qu'Appelle retransmitter. That station is now CKCK-TV-7; "CKTV" is currently used the call sign for a Radio-Canada owned-and-operated station in Saguenay, Quebec. Nevertheless, while the station identifies itself only as CTV, many people in southern Saskatchewan still call the station "CKTV" or "CK".

In December 2008, CTVglobemedia applied to the CRTC to operate an HD feed of CKCK-TV, which would be delivered as a "satellite-to-cable" feed. The move would allow CKCK to operate an HD signal which could be substituted in place of American HD signals on local cable services, without actually operating an over-the-air digital television transmitter.

As with its Saskatoon sister station, CKCK's programming is aired in pattern with that of Winnipeg sister station CKY-DT, with prime time programming running from 7 p.m. to 10 p.m. simultaneously with East Coast stations, and CTV's 7 p.m. ET programming bumped to 10 p.m. However, as Saskatchewan does not observe daylight saving time and remains on Central Standard Time year-round, programming is delayed by an hour in comparison to CKY when DST is in effect. In March, the station also broadcasts the annual Telemiracle telethon (which alternates between Regina and Saskatoon on a yearly cycle), supporting the Kinsmen and Kinettes of Saskatchewan. The event is simulcast by all CTV stations in Saskatchewan.

== News operation ==
CKCK-DT presently broadcasts 25 hours of locally produced newscasts each week (with five hours each weekday).

CKCK-TV's original newscast was anchored by Jim McLeod, signing on 1954. McLeod anchored for many years, staying on the air long enough to debut the station's first colour newscast in 1973.

On September 22, 1997, the station launched a noon newscast a short time before the Baton Broadcast System rebranded to CTV across Canada.

On October 31, 2011, CKCK debuted a three-hour morning newscast under the title CTV Morning Live, which airs weekdays from 6 to 9 a.m.; other morning newscasts under the CTV Morning Live banner were launched on other CTV owned-and-operated stations across western and central Canada as part of a benefits package that was included as a condition of the sale of the CTV network to Bell Canada. The show was rebranded as CTV Your Morning Saskatchewan on September 15, 2025.

On July 28, 2014, CKCK began producing newscasts in high definition, and introduced a new studio as part of the migration.

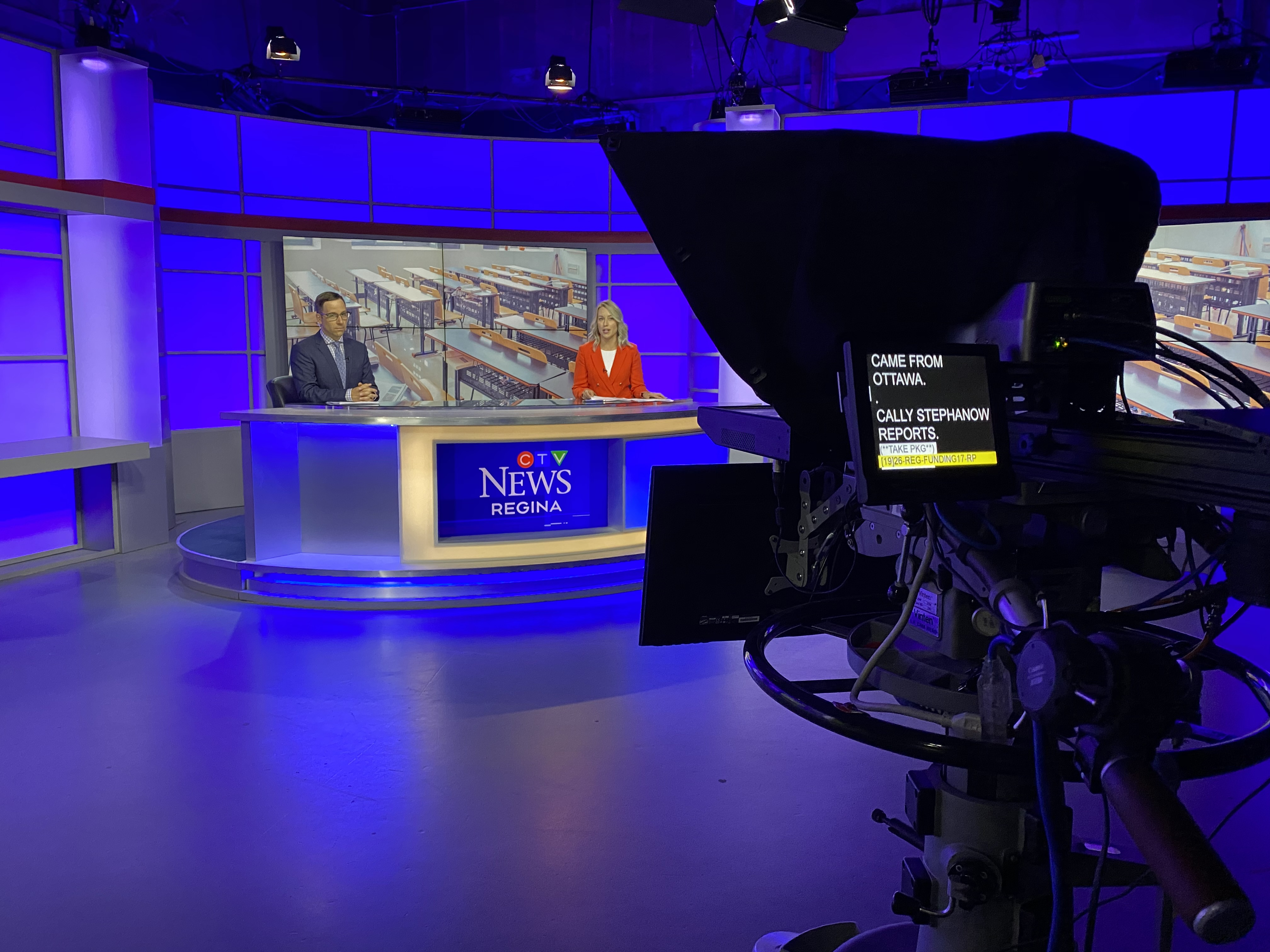
Behind the scenes of a CTV News at Six broadcast from Regina, Saskatchewan on August 26, 2020.

An additional hour of local news coverage was added in 2017 in the 5 p.m. time slot.

CKCK's newscasts are also broadcast by CICC-TV in Yorkton, since that station does not broadcast a local 6 or 11:30 p.m. newscast. As a result, CKCK's program regularly includes reports from Yorkton.

Bell Media cuts on February 8, 2024, resulted in the cancellation of CKCK's noon newscast. The changes also brought the station's provincial weekend 6 and 11:30 p.m. newscasts to an end.

As of September 2025, CTV Your Morning Saskatchewan, CTV News at 5 and CTV News at 11:30 are broadcast from Regina on all CTV stations in Saskatchewan.

== Indigenous Circle ==
In 1993, CKCK-TV began producing a half hour weekly broadcast dedicated to Indigenous affairs titled Indigenous Circle.

The show aired on all CTV stations in Saskatchewan on Sundays, and would feature a range of Indigenous-related news content, interview segments, special documentaries and musical performances.

The final traditional episode of Indigenous Circle aired on February 18, 2018, although the name lives on within a segment of the station's regular newscasts, airing on Tuesdays following the cancellation of CKCK's local weekend newscasts.

Certain stories on CTV National News also use the Indigenous Circle moniker.

== Technical information ==
=== Subchannel ===
Subchannel of CKCK-DT
Channel	Res.	Short name	Programming
2.1	720p		CTV

=== Analog-to-digital conversion ===
On August 31, 2011, when Canadian television stations in CRTC-designated mandatory markets transitioned from analog to digital broadcasts, CKCK flash cut its digital signal into operation on VHF channel 8 at 12:05 a.m. Digital television receivers display CKCK-DT's virtual channel as 2.1. The station's high definition feed began to be carried on Bell Satellite TV channel 1106 on September 12, 2011.

=== Former transmitters ===
- CKMC-TV 12 Swift Current
- CKMJ-TV 7 Moose Jaw

On February 11, 2016, Bell Media applied for its regular license renewals, which included applications to delete a long list of transmitters, including CKCK-TV-1, CKCK-TV-2, CKCK-TV-7 and CKMC-TV-1. Bell Media's rationale for deleting these analog repeaters is below:

"We are electing to delete these analog transmitters from the main licence with which they are associated. These analog transmitters generate no incremental revenue, attract little to no viewership given the growth of BDU or DTH subscriptions and are costly to maintain, repair or replace. In addition, none of the highlighted transmitters offer any programming that differs from the main channels. The Commission has determined that broadcasters may elect to shut down transmitters but will lose certain regulatory privileges (distribution on the basic service, the ability to request simultaneous substitution) as noted in Broadcasting Regulatory Policy CRTC 2015–24, Over-the-air transmission of television signals and local programming. We are fully aware of the loss of these regulatory privileges as a result of any transmitter shutdown."

The licence for those transmitters expired in August 2017, and were subsequently shut down. At the same time, Bell Media applied to convert the licenses of CTV Two Atlantic (formerly ASN) and CTV Two Alberta (formerly ACCESS) from satellite-to-cable undertakings into television stations without transmitters (similar to cable-only network affiliates in the United States), and to reduce the level of educational content on CTV Two Alberta. With the shutdown of CJFB-TV several years ago, Bell also asked for the change to the condition of license for its repeater in Swift Current, CKMC-TV that prevents it from soliciting advertising in that community, and that CJFB-TV may substitute commercials on it (which is irrelevant since the station is no longer in operation).

On July 30, 2019, Bell Media was granted permission to close down the transmitters for CKMC-TV and CKMJ-TV as part of Broadcasting Decision CRTC 2019-268. Both transmitters were scheduled to close down by February 26, 2021.
