= Time in Saskatchewan =

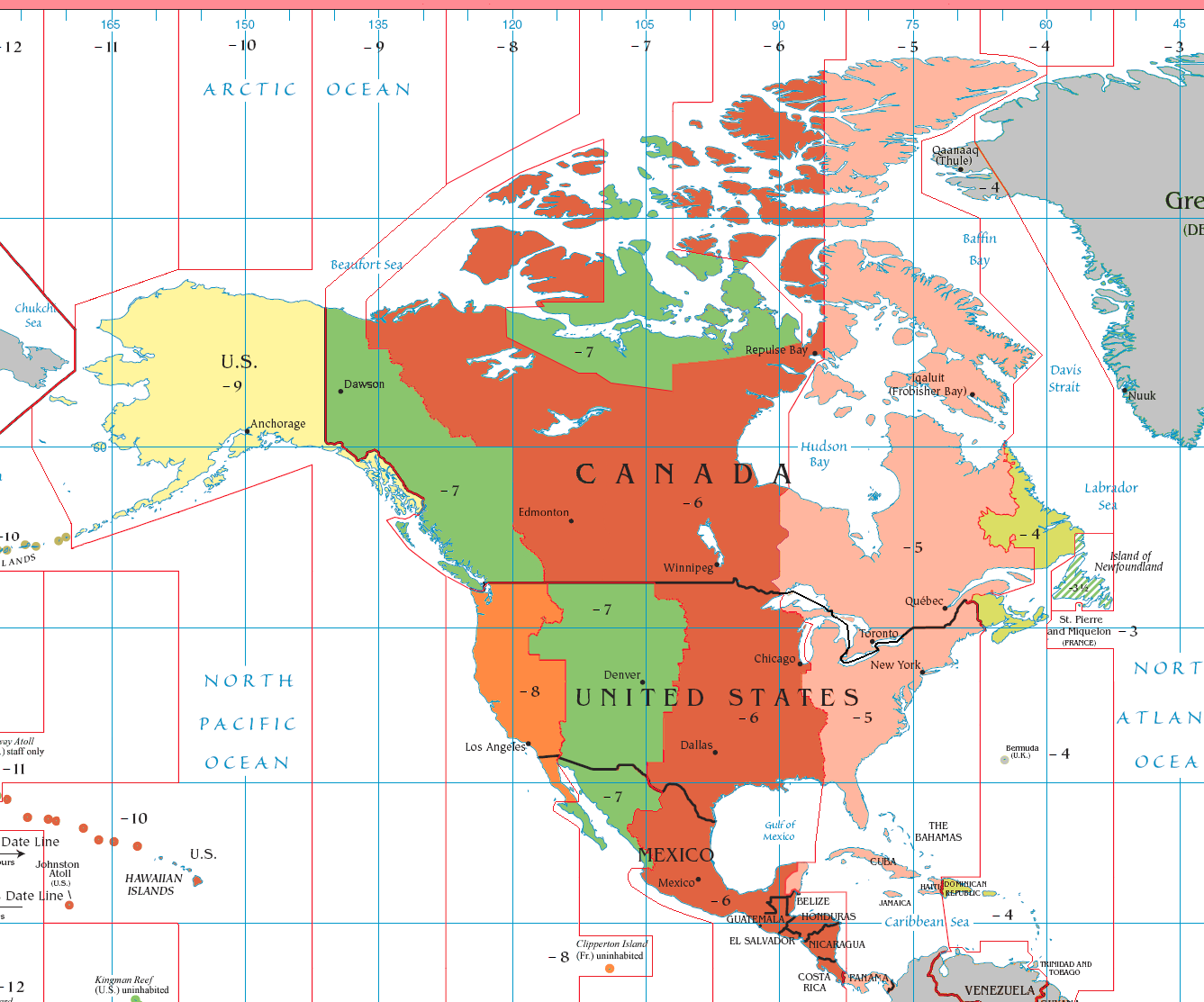
The time zones of North America. The westward protrusion of the Central Time Zone created by the province of Saskatchewan's observance of CST indicates it exists in the Mountain Time Zone but observes CST.

Time zones in Canada

Standard	DST	Time zone name (Note: The time zone column does not have legal meaning and may deviate from the government-designated name of the time zone.)
UTC−07:00 (year-round)		Mountain (Note: Year-round UTC−7 is referred to as Pacific Time (PCT) by the British Columbia government (not to be confused with Pacific Standard Time in the United States) and as Yukon Standard Time by the Yukon government.)
UTC−07:00	UTC−06:00	Mountain
UTC−06:00 (year-round)		Central (Note: Year-round UTC−6 is referred to as Alberta Time by the Alberta government and as Northwest Territories Time by the Northwest Territories government.)
UTC−06:00	UTC−05:00	Central
UTC−05:00 (year-round)		Eastern (Note: Year-round UTC−5 is referred to as Manitoba Standard Time (MBT) by the Manitoba government.)
UTC−05:00	UTC−04:00	Eastern
UTC−04:00 (year-round)		Atlantic
UTC−04:00	UTC−03:00	Atlantic
UTC−03:30	UTC−02:30	Newfoundland

The Canadian province of Saskatchewan observes Central Standard Time (UTC−06:00) year-round and does not observe daylight saving time. Until 2020 (when Yukon moved to only using DST), Saskatchewan was the only province or territory in Canada to not perform twice-yearly clock changes. In spring of 2026 British Columbia announced it would stay on DST, followed by Alberta and the Northwest Territories adopted permanent DST and are therefore synchronized with Saskatchewan year-round, while Manitoba adopted permanent DST and is therefore one hour earlier year-round.

After previously using a patchwork of Mountain and Central Time on a regional basis, Saskatchewan adopted permanent CST province-wide in 1966, with certain communities in western Saskatchewan given the option to follow Mountain Time in alignment with Alberta. This option was used primarily by Lloydminster, which falls directly on the provincial border. Saskatchewan is bisected by the 105th meridian—the reference meridian for the Mountain Time Zone; by adopting year-round CST, its time matched Mountain Daylight Time and clocks in Alberta while DST was in effect. In 2026, Saskatchewan placed Lloydminster under permanent CST for alignment with the rest of the province, maintaining consistency with Alberta's adoption of permanent DST.

During the summer, clocks in the entire province match those of Denver. During the winter, clocks match those of Chicago.

== History ==
A federal bill passed in 1890 initially assigned Saskatchewan to the 105th Meridian time seven hours behind Greenwich Mean Time, which was enshrined in provincial law in 1909 as referring to Mountain Standard Time.

In Saskatchewan, the choice of time zone was delegated to municipal governments. The result was a patchwork of towns following either of the two neighbouring time zones—Mountain Standard Time (MST) or Central Standard Time—with or without daylight saving time, usually based on whether they were in the east or west of the province. Residents were also divided, with urban residents generally supporting MST, and rural residents supporting CST.

In 1966, the Saskatchewan provincial government commissioned a study from Earl Milton, a professional astronomer living in the province. He recommended the province-wide adoption of MST, as it was the "true" time zone for Saskatchewan based on Sandford Fleming's system of worldwide standard time, and that "the intrusion of Central Standard Time into eastern and urban Saskatchewan coupled with the use of daylight saving time in central and western Saskatchewan (both on the local option basis)" made the province "the buffer zone between two overextended time zones of the neighbouring provinces. The study suggested that province-wide MST would reduce "clock error" from solar time to as little as 20 minutes, would provide "a better distribution of the shortened daylight hours relative to the normal daily lives of Saskatchewan residents" during the winter, and could allow for a unified "Prairie time" with Alberta and Manitoba.

The Saskatchewan government subsequently passed the Time Act: contrary to the study's recommendations, the Act established Central Standard Time as the permanent time zone for the entirety of the province. However, certain communities in proximity to Saskatchewan's western border with Alberta were designated as "time option areas", which granted their municipal governments and surrounding communities (defined based on school board boundaries) the ability to hold local referendums on using Mountain Time instead.

Two cities—Lloydminster (which lies directly on the Alberta border) and Swift Current—invoked this option and adopted Mountain Time and DST for alignment with Alberta, although Swift Current later switched back to CST with the rest of the province. As they fall along Saskatchewan's eastern border, the communities of Creighton and Denare Beach have usually observed DST unofficially for alignment with Manitoba and the larger, nearby town of Flin Flon.

In 2007, Saskatchewan Party leader Brad Wall pledged during the provincial election campaign that he would hold a referendum on the use of DST if elected. In March 2011, Wall reversed course and stated that he would no longer pursue the referendum, citing opinion polling which consistently showed that a strong majority of residents favoured the long-standing status quo.

In 2026, the province of Alberta adopted year-round Mountain Daylight Time as "Alberta Time", matching Saskatchewan. In alignment with the decision, the Time Act, 2026 came into effect on October 30, 2026; the bill reaffirms Central Standard Time as the single time zone for the entirety of Saskatchewan, aligning Lloydminster with the rest of the province and Alberta year-round. The bill also provides additional flexibility for border regions to respond to time zone changes by neighbouring provinces, and removes the requirement that changes be approved by vote.

== Saskatchewan Time Zone ==
Due to these discrepancies, many computer programs and major operating systems offer a distinct "Saskatchewan" option when listing time zone options that automatically disables seasonal clock changes for Daylight Saving. In the tz database, the America/Regina, America/Swift_Current, and America/Edmonton entries result in Saskatchewan time.

The current wording of the Time Act dictates "Central standard time shall be used and observed throughout the year", which is defined to be "the time that is six hours behind Greenwich time". With respect to mean solar time, however, this translates into Saskatchewan effectively being on daylight saving time year-round. In the map above, Saskatchewan is the rectangle of Central Standard Time protruding into Mountain Standard Time in Canada, visually displaying that geographically, Saskatchewan is in the Mountain Time Zone.

== See also ==
- Time in Canada
- Time in Arizona
