= CBKST =

Television station in Saskatchewan, Canada (1971–2012)

Saskatoon, Saskatchewan; Canada
- Channels: Analog: 11 (VHF)
- Branding: CBC Television

Programming
- Affiliations: CBC

Ownership
- Owner: Canadian Broadcasting Corporation
- Sister stations: CBK (AM), CBKS-FM

History
- First air date: October 17, 1971
- Last air date: July 31, 2012
- Call sign meaning: CBC Kelsey Saskatoon Television

Technical information
- ERP: 325 kW
- HAAT: 239.6 m (786 ft)
- Transmitter coordinates: 52°10′28″N 106°26′5″W

CBKST (channel 11) was a CBC Television station in Saskatoon, Saskatchewan, Canada, which operated from 1971 to 2012. The station's master control facilities were located in the Hutchinson Building on 2nd Avenue South (between 21 and 22 Streets East) in Downtown Saskatoon after being relocated from an office tower above Midtown Plaza. Its transmitter was located between Highways 5 and 41.

CBKST was licensed as a rebroadcaster of CBKT-DT in Regina, even though it operated as a semi-satellite with its own associated network of repeaters; it aired separate commercials and (until the 1990s) its own local news broadcasts. On cable, the station was available on Shaw Cable channel 12 and Sasktel Max channel 3.

While the CBC originally planned to discontinue CBKST's over the air feed on August 31, 2011 (as the corporation did not originally plan to convert rebroadcasters in mandatory transition markets like Saskatoon to digital), the Canadian Radio-television and Telecommunications Commission (CRTC) granted the CBC permission to allow transmitters in selected mandatory markets, including Saskatoon, to still operate an analogue feed until August 31, 2012. On July 17, 2012, the CRTC approved the CBC's application to delete CBKST from CBKT's licence, effective August 1, 2012. On July 31, 2012, CBKST was shut down after more than 41 years on the air.

Since the closure of CBKST, cable and satellite providers have piped in CBKT (which took over CBKST's slots) and other CBC outlets for their customers. Due to the high penetration of cable and satellite in Saskatoon and elsewhere in central and northern Saskatchewan, few viewers actually lost access to CBC programming.

== History ==
As early as 1967, efforts were under way to secure a new CBC affiliate for Saskatoon. CFQC-TV, which had been the only station in Saskatoon since going on the air in December 1954, had wished to switch to CTV once the federal government commissioned a new CBC station. In November 1967, however, the federal government declined an application by the CBC to establish a new station, with Prime Minister Lester B. Pearson stating reasons including cost-cutting by the government and the fact CFQC already existed to provide CBC programming.

After this and further delays, the CBC was finally approved to launch a new station in Saskatoon. In a move that would come back to haunt the station, however, it was not licensed as a full standalone station in its own right, but as a rebroadcaster of Regina's CBKRT (now CBKT). CBKST ultimately launched at 5:30 p.m. on October 17, 1971 as Saskatoon's second television station. CFQC, which had begun airing select CTV programming in off-hours since 1969, became an exclusive CTV affiliate at CBKST's launch. The first program aired was the religious music series Hymn Sing.

Like most local CBC stations, in the 1970s and 1980s, CBKST had its own newsroom and aired local newscasts and other original programming, as well as locally-aired syndicated reruns of off-network American shows outside of the network schedule. Notable personalities included veteran sportscaster Lloyd Saunders and newscaster Cathy Little. The station's studios were originally located on the fifth floor of CN Towers (renamed Tower at Midtown in 2006), an office block located above Saskatoon's Midtown Plaza shopping centre. In August 1976, CBKST was temporarily knocked off the air for several days when several chunks of concrete, each weighing several thousand pounds, fell off the side of CN Towers and went crashing into the mall below; fortunately, businesses at the Plaza had closed for the day and no one was injured as there was no one inside the Plaza at that point.

For several years from 1978 until December 31, 1985, CBKST used the brand "Saskatoon 11/12" on-air and in print, reflecting the station's respective over-the-air and cable channels in the city. At the time, the CBKST logo consisted of the name "SASKATOON" with the station's channel numbers contained within the "O"s. That logo was retired when the CBC's reimaging program began on January 1, 1986.

In December 1990, nationwide cutbacks at the CBC resulted in many CBKST staff being laid off and its supper hour newscast cancelled. At this time, the station began sharing the "CBC Saskatchewan" branding with CBKT in Regina. In the early 2000s, the station moved into a new storefront studio facility, taking over the heritage Hutchinson Building, a few blocks away from CN Towers on 2nd Avenue South, which it shared with its Radio-Canada counterpart, CBKFT.

In 2002, CBC purchased former Prince Albert, Saskatchewan affiliate CKBI from previous owner Bell Globemedia (parent company of CTV), turning CKBI into a rebroadcaster of CBKST; prior to this, CKBI had been a separate CBC affiliate (despite the CTV-related ownership).

CBKST had ties to the CBC's longest-running import, Coronation Street, according to the 2002 edition of the Guinness Book of Records (and noted in previous editions), CBKST acquired 1,144 episodes of the British soap from Granada Television on May 31, 1971, the largest number of TV shows ever purchased in one transaction. (CBC's English flagship, CBLT in Toronto, was the first to televise Coronation Street in Canada, in 1966.)

On May 16, 2008, CBKST was given approval by the CRTC to delete its transmitters in Big River and Tisdale. Viewers that had been served by the two stations were later served by two other CBKST transmitters, CBKST-TV-3 Leoville and CBKST-TV-11 Greenwater Lake.

== Transmitters ==
CBKST had over 20 analog over-the-air television rebroadcasters in several northern Saskatchewan communities such as Prince Albert and North Battleford.

Due to federal funding reductions to the CBC, in April 2012, the CBC responded with substantial budget cuts, which included shutting down CBC's and Radio-Canada's remaining analog transmitters, including CBKST, on July 31, 2012. None of CBC or Radio-Canada's rebroadcasters were converted to digital.

=== Former transmitters ===
| City of licence | Callsign | Channel | ERP (W) |
|---|---|---|---|
| Beauval | CBKBT | 7 (VHF) | 7,700 |
| Buffalo Narrows | CBKDT | 11 (VHF) | 321 |
| Fond-du-Lac | CBKAT-2 | 10 (VHF) | 402 |
| Greenwater Lake | CBKST-11 | 4 (VHF) | 3,000 |
| Île-à-la-Crosse | CBKCT | 9 (VHF) | 105 |
| La Loche | CBKDT-2 | 13 (VHF) | 180 |
| La Ronge | CBKST-2 | 12 (VHF) | 60 |
| Leoville | CBKST-3 | 12 (VHF) | 39,200 |
| Montreal Lake | CBKST-5 | 11 (VHF) | 168 |
| Nipawin | CBKST-15 | 10 (VHF) | 4,300 w |
| North Battleford | CBKST-10 | 7 (VHF) | 10,000 w |
| Palmbere Lake | CBKDT-1 | 8 (VHF) | 7 |
| Patuanak | CBKPT | 5 (VHF) | 45 |
| Pinehouse Lake | CBKST-6 | 10 (VHF) | 7.7 |
| Prince Albert | CBKST-9 | 5 (VHF) | 13,000 |
| Southend | CBKST-8 | 13 (VHF) | 36 |
| Spiritwood | CBKST-13 | 2 (VHF) | 5,000 |
| Stanley Mission | CBKST-4 | 8 (VHF) | 333 |
| Stony Rapids | CBKAT-3 | 7 (VHF) | 320 |
| Stranraer | CBKST-1 | 9 (VHF) | 163,000 |
| Uranium City | CBKAT | 8 (VHF) | 370 |

== See also ==
- List of CBC television stations
