= Hutchinson Building =

Coordinates: 52.1278°N 106.6640°W

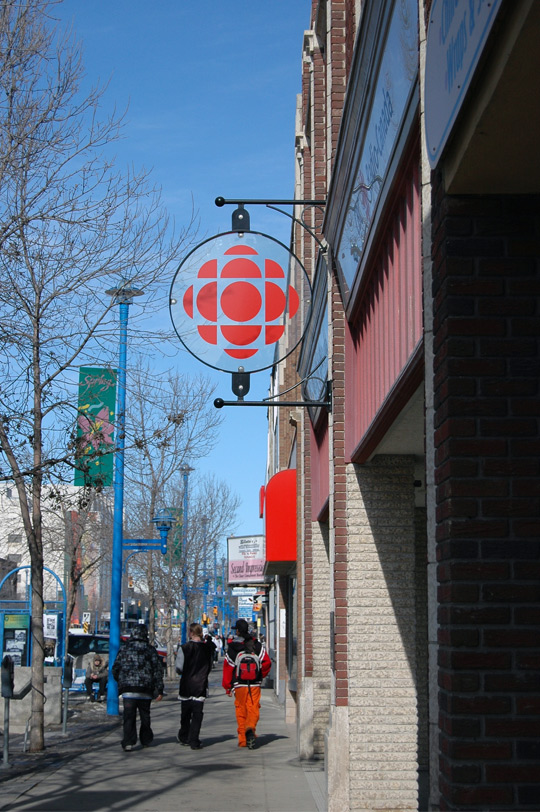
- Former CBC Studio Entrance
- Interactive map of the Hutchinson Building area

General information
- Location: 144 2nd Avenue South, Saskatoon, Saskatchewan, Canada
- Completed: 1923

Design and construction
- Architect: Frank P. Martin

The Hutchinson Building is a landmark building located in downtown Saskatoon, Saskatchewan, Canada. The building was designed by architect Frank P. Martin built to house the Saskatoon Hardware Store Ltd until 1970 then the building was taken over by Saskatoon Handicraft Supplies until 1995. The building was designated a heritage property on August 9, 1999.

The studios of the CBC Television station CBKST were located in the building prior to the station's shutdown in 2012.
