= CIPA-DT =

Television station in Prince Albert, Saskatchewan

Semi-satellite of CFQC-DT, Saskatoon, Saskatchewan

Prince Albert, Saskatchewan; Canada
- Channels: Digital: 9 (VHF); Virtual: 9
- Branding: CTV Prince Albert (general); CTV News Prince Albert (local newscasts)

Programming
- Affiliations: CTV

Ownership
- Owner: Bell Media Inc.

History
- First air date: January 12, 1987
- Former call signs: CIPA-TV (1987–2023)
- Former channel numbers: Analog: 9 (VHF, 1987–2023)
- Call sign meaning: CI Prince Albert

Technical information
- Licensing authority: CRTC
- ERP: 11 kW
- HAAT: 212 m (696 ft)
- Transmitter coordinates: 53°3′27″N 105°50′31.2″W

Links
- Website: CTV Prince Albert; CTV Saskatoon

CIPA-DT (channel 9, cable channel 8) is a television station in Prince Albert, Saskatchewan, Canada, owned and operated by the CTV Television Network, a division of Bell Media. The station's studios are located at the corner of 6th Avenue East & 28th Street East (in the Carlton Court Shopping Centre) in Prince Albert, with transmitter between Louis Riel Trail/Highway 11 and Highway 2, south-southwest of the city.

CIPA-DT operates as a semi-satellite of CFQC-DT in Saskatoon, running the same programming as that station at all times (except for certain commercials and a separate 5 p.m. newscast).

== History ==
CIPA began transmission on January 12, 1987. In 2002, CTV parent company Bell Globemedia (now Bell Media) sold CIPA's former CBC-affiliated twinstick sister station, CKBI-TV, to the CBC, which then made CKBI a rebroadcaster of CBKST in Saskatoon. CBC shut down the transmitter in 2012, leaving CIPA as the only over-the-air television station in Prince Albert.

In November 2023, the station launched its digital signal.

== News programming ==
CIPA's former logo (1998–2001)

CIPA has made several attempts at local newscasts over the years. However, due to recent cutbacks, as of February 12, 2024, its only local newscast is CTV News at Five. The newscast is presented by Chantel Saunders from the CTV Saskatoon studios, with reporters filing stories from Prince Albert. It otherwise simulcasts CTV Saskatoon's 6 p.m. newscast, as well as the provincial newscasts in the morning and at 11:30 p.m. that originate from CTV Regina.

== Former transmitters ==
- CIPA-TV-1 Alticane
- CIPA-TV-2 Big River (Note: CIPA-TV-2 was among a long list of CTV rebroadcasters nationwide to have shut down on or before August 31, 2009, as part of a political dispute with Canadian authorities on paid fee-for-carriage requirements for cable television operators. A subsequent change in ownership assigned full control of CTVglobemedia to Bell Canada; as of 2011, these transmitters remained in normal licensed broadcast operation.)
- CKBQ-TV Melfort
- CKBQ-TV-1 Nipawin

Notes

On February 11, 2016, Bell Media applied for its regular license renewals, which included applications to delete a long list of transmitters, including CIPA-TV-1, CIPA-TV-2, CKBQ-TV and CKBQ-TV-1. Bell Media's rationale for deleting these analog repeaters is below:

"We are electing to delete these analog transmitters from the main licence with which they are associated. These analog transmitters generate no incremental revenue, attract little to no viewership given the growth of BDU or DTH subscriptions and are costly to maintain, repair or replace. In addition, none of the highlighted transmitters offer any programming that differs from the main channels. The Commission has determined that broadcasters may elect to shut down transmitters but will lose certain regulatory privileges (distribution on the basic service, the ability to request simultaneous substitution) as noted in Broadcasting Regulatory Policy CRTC 2015-24, Over-the-air transmission of television signals and local programming. We are fully aware of the loss of these regulatory privileges as a result of any transmitter shutdown."

At the same time, Bell Media applied to convert the licenses of CTV 2 Atlantic (formerly ASN) and CTV 2 Alberta (formerly ACCESS) from satellite-to-cable undertakings into television stations without transmitters (similar to cable-only network affiliates in the United States), and to reduce the level of educational content on CTV2 Alberta.
