= CHAB-TV =

Television station in Moose Jaw (1959–1978)

- Moose Jaw, Saskatchewan; Canada
- Channels: Analog: 4 (VHF)

Programming
- Affiliations: CBC (1959–1962 and 1969–1978); CTV (1962–1969)

Ownership
- Owner: CHAB Ltd. (1959–1969); Canadian Broadcasting Corporation (1969–1978)

History
- First air date: July 7, 1959
- Last air date: July 31, 1978; (19 years, 24 days); (Newsroom ceased 1984)
- Former call signs: CHAB-TV (1959–1969); CBKMT (1969–1978)

Technical information
- ERP: 100 kW
- Transmitter coordinates: 50°23′37.3″N 105°56′24.5″W

CHAB-TV (channel 4) was a television station in Moose Jaw, Saskatchewan, Canada.

The station signed on the air on July 7, 1959, under the ownership of CHAB Ltd., the parent company of Moose Jaw radio station CHAB. It was originally a CBC affiliate. On August 25, 1962, as part of an agreement with CKCK-TV in Regina, CHAB-TV switched to CTV and signed on CHRE-TV on the air as a semi-satellite in Regina on December 21 that year. In return, CKCK-TV signed on a rebroadcaster in Moose Jaw.

On May 30, 1968, Moffat Broadcasting, owner of Winnipeg's CTV affiliate, CJAY-TV, bought CHAB Ltd. The Canadian Radio-television and Telecommunications Commission (CRTC), however, told Moffat to sell CHAB-TV and CHRE to a new owner within one year. Moffat tried to sell CHAB and CHRE to Western Broadcast Management Ltd., owner of CHAN-TV in Vancouver. However, the CRTC denied this bid on July 18, 1969, in favour of a counteroffer from the CBC. On September 13, CBC officially assumed control of CHRE and CHAB and recalled the stations as CBKRT and CBKMT, respectively. CBKRT was made the main station, with CBKMT as a semi-satellite.

On July 31, 1978, CBKRT was recalled CBKT. On the same date, CBKMT ceased to exist as a separate station. Its transmitter became part of the Regina station's licence and continued in operation as CBKT-1, a full-time rebroadcaster of CBKT; rebroadcasters in Gravelbourg and Willow Bunch were also transferred to the new licence. However, CBKMT maintained its own local television newsroom until 1984 when it became a full repeater of CBKT-TV in Regina and when CBKT opened the CBC Southwest Saskatchewan Broadcast Centre on Broad Street in Regina. The transmitter was finally shut down on July 31, 2012, due to austerity measures implemented at the CBC.
