= Toby (TV series) =

Toby is a Canadian sitcom that aired on CBC Television during the 1968–69 television season. The show stars Susan Petrie as Toby Mitchell, a teenage girl juggling her family life and her friendship with Quebec exchange student J. J. Roberge (Robert Duparc). The show also stars Arch McDonnell and Micki Moore as Toby's parents, and Peter Young as her younger brother Mark.

Although the show aired during a period of great social change, the show was somewhat of a throwback to an earlier era, depicting Toby as relatively innocent and traditional. The Toronto Star described the show as "Canada's own Gidget". Petrie herself commented to the Star that "Toby is supposed to be the perfect teenager. I'm not sure I believe her yet.... You know, I would like to tell it like it is. Toby is the type of girl who will go to college, marry the guy she meets in English 345, arrange flowers, be a good hostess — and raise more Tobys."

The show was not particularly successful, and was not renewed for a second season.
