= CKBI-TV =

Television station in Prince Albert, Saskatchewan (1958–2002)

Prince Albert, Saskatchewan; Canada
- Channels: Analog: 5 (VHF)

Programming
- Affiliations: CBC Television

Ownership
- Owner: Edward Rawlinson (1958–1984); Yorkton Television (1984–1986); Baton Broadcasting/CTV Inc. (1986–2002)

History
- First air date: January 27, 1958
- Last air date: October 27, 2002; (44 years, 273 days)

Technical information
- ERP: 100 kW
- HAAT: 236.6 m (776 ft)
- Transmitter coordinates: 53°3′26″N 105°50′30″W

CKBI-TV (channel 5) was a television station in Prince Albert, Saskatchewan, Canada. The station was in operation from 1958 to 2002 as a private affiliate of CBC Television.

== History ==
CKBI was established on January 27, 1958, by Edward Rawlinson, the founder of Rawlco Communications. Although it primarily aired CBC programming, it also broadcast a mixture of local and privately purchased (i.e. syndicated) programming that differed from full network affiliates. From the early 1980s onward, it was piped into Saskatoon by the local cable provider, Telecable (later Shaw Cable).

In 1984, CKBI was purchased by Yorkton Television, the owner of the CKOS/CICC twinstick in Yorkton. It was the sole station in the market at the time of its sale. In 1986, Yorkton Television was acquired by Baton Broadcasting. Although Yorkton held a license to launch CIPA-TV at the time of its sale to Baton, the station did not go on the air until 1987. Later in 1987, CKBI/CIPA joined with CKOS/CICC, CKCK-TV in Regina and CFQC-TV in Saskatoon to form the Saskatchewan Television Network, which in turn merged with Baton's Ontario stations in 1994 to form the Baton Broadcast System.

In 1995, due to cutbacks, CKBI scrapped local newscasts in favour of the CBC News Hour piped in from CBKT in Regina. All the reporters and staff went over to CIPA following the announcement. Baton became sole owner of CTV in 1997 and changed its name to CTV Inc. a year later.

In 2002, CTV sold CKBI and CKOS to the CBC. CKBI signed off for the last time as a separate station on October 27, 2002. Its transmitter became a rebroadcaster of CBKST in Saskatoon under the callsign CBKST-9. CBKST-9 was among 620 translators shut down by the CBC on July 31, 2012, due to budget cuts affecting the network.

CKBI-TV used this promo box to showcase its logo and its promotions as of the 1972-73 television season.

CKBI-TV used this promo box to showcase its logo and its promotions as of the 1973-74 television season.

CKBI-TV in Fall 1973 was using this logo, which mimicked the CBC Television logo of the time, prior to the introduction of the "Exploding Pizza" in December 1974.
