= CFQC-DT =

Television station in Saskatoon

- Saskatoon, Saskatchewan; Canada
- Channels: Digital: 8 (VHF); Virtual: 8
- Branding: CTV Saskatoon (general); CTV News Saskatoon (newscasts)

Programming
- Affiliations: 8.1: CTV

Ownership
- Owner: Bell Media Inc.

History
- First air date: December 5, 1954
- Former call signs: CFQC-TV (1954–2011)
- Former channel numbers: Analog: 8 (VHF, 1954–2011)
- Former affiliations: CBC (1954–1971); CTV (secondary, 1969–1971)
- Call sign meaning: "Canada's Finest Quality Channel" (unofficial)

Technical information
- Licensing authority: CRTC
- ERP: 13 kW
- HAAT: 267.9 m (879 ft)
- Transmitter coordinates: 52°11′28″N 106°23′16″W

Links
- Website: CTV Saskatoon

CFQC-DT (channel 8, cable channel 9) is a television station in Saskatoon, Saskatchewan, Canada, owned and operated by the CTV Television Network, a division of Bell Media. The station's studios are located on 1st Avenue North and 23rd Street East in Saskatoon's Central Business District, with transmitter near Highway 41 and Burgheim Road, northeast of the city.

Master control facilities are located at the studios of CFCN-DT in Calgary, shared with eight other CTV owned-and-operated stations in British Columbia, Alberta and Saskatchewan.

== History ==
Station logo, circa 1970s.

CFQC-TV used this logo and promotional format as of Fall 1973.

CFQC-TV first signed on the air on December 5, 1954; it was originally owned by the Murphy family along with CFQC radio (AM 600, now CKBL-FM at 92.9). The first program broadcast (other than test patterns) was a film of the 42nd Grey Cup game, followed by assorted entertainment programs and the station's first newscast. CFQC reported the next day that 40,000 viewers had tuned in, with the station's signal reported to have been received as far away as 40 miles (64 km) south of Regina.

Initially a CBC affiliate, as early as 1967, the Murphys wanted to switch to CTV. However, these plans were put on hold in November 1967 when the federal government denied an application for a new CBC station, citing budget cuts, among other reasons. Eventually, however, Regina's CBKRT (now CBKT) won permission to set up a rebroadcaster in Saskatoon. CFQC-TV, meanwhile, started airing CTV programs on tape delay in 1969, becoming a full-time CTV affiliate on October 17, 1971, when CBKST signed on as a rebroadcaster of CBKRT.

CFQC-TV's former logo (1998–2001).

The Murphy family bowed out of broadcasting in 1972 and sold CFQC-AM-TV to Baton Broadcasting, owners of CTV's flagship station, CFTO-TV in Toronto. There were some concerns that the Canadian Radio-television and Telecommunications Commission (CRTC) would not approve of one person owning two CTV stations, especially if that person was Baton, by far the largest and richest station owner. At the time, CTV was a cooperative based on the concept of "one owner, one vote." However, a provision in the cooperative's bylaws provided that if one owner ever bought a second station, the acquired station's shares would be redistributed among the other seven owners so that each owner would still have only one vote out of eight. The CRTC approved the deal in late 1972, and the Murphy family earned a handsome return on patriarch Pappy Murphy's original investment when he founded CFQC radio in 1923.

In 1986, Baton purchased CKCK-TV in Regina and CBC/CTV twinsticks in Yorkton and Prince Albert, Saskatchewan. Eventually, CFQC-TV became the centre of Baton's Saskatchewan operations. In 1987, Baton's six Saskatchewan stations began branding as the Saskatchewan Television Network, which joined with Baton's Ontario stations in 1994 as the Baton Broadcast System. Baton bought controlling interest in CTV in 1997, making CFQC-TV a CTV owned-and-operated station.

In the past, it identified itself as "CFQC", "TV8" and (during much of the 1970s and '80s) "QC8, Saskatoon Television." Although now known as "CTV Saskatoon", per the current branding standards for CTV affiliates, many longtime viewers in central and northern Saskatchewan still refer to the station as "QC" or "QC8". The QC8 branding continued to be used even after the station began to air on channel 9 for those who subscribed to Shaw Cable.

A number of local programs were produced at CFQC's Saskatoon studios over the years. Children's television host Helen Lumby hosted a kindergarten-focused show at CFQC in her early career, before moving on to create Size Small. In the 1970s and 1980s, the station aired a number of public affairs programs, often with titles playing on the "Q" element of the station identity, such as Big Q Country (political discussion) and Q-Line (a phone-in program where viewers could ask questions of civic leaders, among others). CFQC also produced a companion program to the national Canada AM morning show titled Saskatchewan AM, which combined local news with children's programming such as reruns of Rocket Robin Hood.

From 1954 until 1991, CFQC-TV shared some on-air personnel such as newsreaders with CFQC-AM, as well as studio facilities. This ended when CFQC-AM was sold. The radio station continued to share the CFQC call letters after it moved to the FM dial in 1995 (though for promotional purposes it was rebranded Hot93). In 2007, CFQC-FM officially changed call letters to CKBL-FM, leaving the TV station the only user of the original call letters dating back to 1923.

As with its Regina sister station, CFQC's programming is aired in pattern with that of Winnipeg sister station CKY-DT, with prime time programming running from 7 p.m. to 10 p.m. simultaneously with east coast stations, and CTV's 7 p.m. ET programming bumped to 10 p.m. However, as Saskatchewan does not observe daylight saving time and remains on Central Standard Time year-round, programming is delayed by an hour in comparison to CKY when DST is in effect. As with all other CTV stations in Saskatchewan, it broadcasts the annual Telemiracle telethon (which alternates between Saskatoon and Regina on a yearly cycle) in March, supporting the Kinsmen and Kinettes of Saskatchewan.

== News operation ==
As of September 15, 2023, CFQC-DT broadcasts 10 hours of news programming presented from CFQC's Saskatoon studios each week (two hours each weekday). An additional 24 hours of provincial news programming per week from CTV Regina is simulcast on CFQC.

Alumni of CFQC's news department include Keith Morrison, who went on to become the weekend anchor of the CTV National News before joining NBC, and Don Wittman, who became a sports commentator for the CBC. Dawna Friesen, after a stint at CFQC, furthered her career in U.S. broadcast journalism before becoming anchor of the Global network's national newscast Global National in 2010. Natasha Staniszewski had a stint with CFQC from 2007 to 2009, became a co-anchor for the late-night edition of SportsCentre on TSN, and is now a media host for the CFL's Calgary Stampeders and the NHL's Calgary Flames. Jim McCrory worked for CFQC in various capacities from 1963 to his retirement in 2001; McCrory died in January 2012. One of the longest-serving alumni of the station was Greg Barnsley, who joined CFQC when it first went on the air in the 1950s and remained as a general-duties host and weather forecaster until his retirement in the mid-1990s.

Newscaster Rob MacDonald was the longest-serving on-air personality, being part of CFQC from March 15, 1976, until his retirement on January 20, 2017. Sportscaster Kevin Waugh worked at the station for close to 40 years, prior to his election as a Member of Parliament for Saskatoon—Grasswood in the 2015 Canadian federal election. Waugh and Barnsley "flipped the switch" that officially transferred CFQC to digital broadcasts in 2011. With the retirement of Craig Wilson in early 2019, Jeff Rogstad is currently the longest serving on-air personality active at the station.

CFQC's newscasts are also broadcast by CIPA-TV in Prince Albert, since that station does not broadcast a local 6 or 11:30 p.m. newscast. As a result, CFQC's program regularly includes reports from Prince Albert.

From at least the late 1980's until 1994 (when it became part of BBS and branded its newscasts as "CFQC-TV News"), CFQC was one of only two television stations in Canada known to have adopted the "NewsCentre" branding (a Canadian variation on the popular American "NewsCenter" branding) for its local newscasts, the other being CBC owned and operated affiliate CBUT in Vancouver, which used it briefly in the mid- to late-1980's.

Effective September 15, 2023, CFQC no longer broadcasts local morning, 5 p.m., 11:30 p.m., or weekend evening newscasts from its studios. These local shows were replaced with province-wide news programming originating from CTV Regina, which includes news stories and other content from the Saskatoon newsroom. The noon and 6 p.m. newscasts continued to be presented and broadcast from the CFQC studios. These changes were a result of cutbacks enacted by CTV's parent company, Bell Media, on June 14, 2023. Previously, on October 21, 2017, CFQC had ended broadcast of a stand-alone weekly farm magazine program, Farmgate, in favour of incorporating the segments into its regular newscasts. Up to that point, Farmgate had been the most-watched agricultural program in Saskatchewan and ran for almost three decades.

CFQC's noon newscast was cancelled on February 8, 2024, as part of nationwide programming cuts by Bell Media.

== Radio station ==
The CFQC call letters were originally assigned to an AM radio station that began broadcasting in Saskatoon in 1923 under the ownership of the Murphy family. From 1953 to 1991, the television and radio stations were under common ownership (first the Murphys, then Baton), for a time sharing broadcast facilities and on-air personnel. Baton exited radio in 1991, and CFQC radio moved into its own studio facility. In 1995, the station moved to the FM dial where it became CFQC-FM or "Hot 93". In November 2007, the station changed its call letters to CKBL-FM and it adopted the branding "The Bull".

== Technical information ==
=== Subchannel ===
Subchannel of CFQC-DT
Channel	Res.	Short name	Programming
8.1	1080i	CFRE-HD	CTV

=== Analog-to-digital conversion ===
On August 31, 2011, when Canadian television stations in CRTC-designated mandatory markets transitioned from analog to digital broadcasts, CFQC shut down analog signal and flash cut its digital signal into operation on VHF channel 8 at approximately 12:05 a.m. CT. The ceremonial switchover was conducted by longtime sports anchor Kevin Waugh and now-retired veteran CFQC broadcaster Greg Barnsley, who had been involved with the station when it first signed on the air.

=== Former transmitters ===
- CFQC-TV-1 Stranraer
- CFQC-TV-2 North Battleford

On July 30, 2019, Bell Media was granted permission to close down the analog transmitters for CFQC-TV-1 and CFQC-TV-2 as part of Broadcasting Decision CRTC 2019-268. Both transmitters were shut down by February 26, 2021.
