= CBKF-FM =

Ici Radio-Canada Première station in Regina, Saskatchewan

- Regina, Saskatchewan; Canada
- Broadcast area: Saskatchewan
- Frequency: 97.7 MHz

Programming
- Format: News/Talk
- Network: Ici Radio-Canada Première

Ownership
- Owner: Canadian Broadcasting Corporation
- Sister stations: CBK, CBK-FM, CBKT-DT, CBKFT-DT

History
- First air date: April 24, 1975
- Call sign meaning: CBC, Henry Kelsey, French

Technical information
- Class: B
- ERP: vertical polarization: 5.6 kWs horizontal polarization: 22.3 kW
- HAAT: 146.2 metres (480 ft)

Links
- Website: Ici Radio-Canada Première

CBKF-FM is a Canadian radio station, which broadcasts the programming of Radio-Canada's Ici Radio-Canada Première network on 97.7 FM at Regina, Saskatchewan.

CKBF shares studios with sister stations CBK, CBK-FM, CBKT-DT and CBKFT-DT at the CBC Regina Broadcast Centre at 2440 Broad Street in Downtown Regina; CKBF-FM's transmitter is located near McDonald Street/Highway 46 and Tower Road, just northeast of Regina.

== History ==
The station was launched on April 24, 1975. In 1973, two years prior to the station's launch, the network also purchased two established francophone community radio stations, CFRG in Gravelbourg and CFNS in Saskatoon, and converted them to rebroadcasters of CBKF. The stations were recalled as CBKF-1 and CBKF-2, respectively.

The CFRG calls are now used by a French-language community station in Gravelbourg operating at 93.1 FM.

A community group in Prince Albert, the Société canadienne-française de Prince Albert, held a separate license to rebroadcast CBKF's programming in that city. The 3,000 watt class B community-owned rebroadcaster CKSF-FM 90.1 has gone off the air to be replaced by Ici Radio-Canada Première's CBKF-FM Regina in 2020.

On May 30, 2013, the CRTC approved the CBC's request to increase CBKF-FM's wattage from 13,700 watts to 22,300 watts, with a decrease in the effective height of antenna above average terrain from 153 to 146.2 metres.

== Transmitters ==
Rebroadcasters of CBKF-FM
| City of licence | Identifier | Frequency | Power | Class | RECNet | Notes |
|---|---|---|---|---|---|---|
| Bellegarde | CBKF-FM-4 | 91.9 FM | 4,700 watts | B | Query | 49°30′55.08″N 101°34′51.60″W |
| Gravelbourg | CBKF-1 | 690 AM | 5,000 watts | B | Query | 49°52′15.96″N 106°28′22.80″W |
| North Battleford | CBKF-FM-5 | 96.9 FM | 9,600 watts | B | Query | 52°52′5.88″N 108°26′9.60″W |
| Prince Albert | CBKF-FM-6 | 90.1 FM | 4,985 watts | B1 | Query | 53°3′27″N 105°50′34.80″W |
| Saskatoon | CBKF-2 | 860 AM | 10,000 watts | B | Query | 52°15′0″N 106°39′36″W |
| Zenon Park | CBKF-FM-3 | 93.5 FM | 1,340 watts | B | Query | 53°1′3″N 103°43′33.60″W |

On August 7, 2020, the CBC received CRTC approval to add a new FM transmitter at 90.1 MHz Prince Albert to rebroadcast the programming of CBKF-FM in Regina, Saskatchewan. The new transmitter will also replace CKSF-FM at Prince Albert which was previously owned by Société canadienne-française de Prince Albert, a community-owned rebroadcaster of CBKF-FM Regina. The new call sign become CBKF-FM-6.

On August 28, 2026, the CBC received approval to covert CBKF-2 Saskatoon to the FM band which will operate at 91.7 FM with an ERP of 44,225 watts and a HAAT 175.3 metres (575 ft), both stations will simulcast for no more than three months.
