= CBKFT-DT =

Television station in Regina, Saskatchewan

- Regina, Saskatchewan; Canada
- Channels: Digital: 13 (VHF); Virtual: 13
- Branding: ICI Saskatchewan

Programming
- Affiliations: 13.1: Ici Radio-Canada Télé

Ownership
- Owner: Société Radio-Canada
- Sister stations: CBKT-DT, CBK (AM), CBK-FM, CBKF-FM

History
- First air date: September 27, 1976
- Former call signs: CBKFT (1976–2011)
- Former channel numbers: Analog: 13 (VHF, 1976–2011)
- Call sign meaning: CBC Henry Kelsey Français Télévision

Technical information
- Licensing authority: CRTC
- ERP: 27.1 kW
- HAAT: 183.7 m (603 ft)
- Transmitter coordinates: 50°28′58″N 104°30′20″W

Links
- Website: ICI Saskatchewan

CBKFT-DT (channel 13) is an Ici Radio-Canada Télé station in Regina, Saskatchewan, Canada, serving the province's Fransaskois population. It is part of a twinstick with CBC Television station CBKT-DT (channel 9). The two outlets share studios with sister radio stations CBK, CBK-FM and CBKF-FM at the CBC Regina Broadcast Centre at 2440 Broad Street in Downtown Regina; CBKFT-DT's transmitter is located near McDonald Street/Highway 46, just northeast of Regina proper.

== History ==
CBKFT was licensed by the Canadian Radio-television and Telecommunications Commission (CRTC) on June 9, 1975 and launched on September 27, 1976 by the CBC as a rebroadcaster of CBWFT in Winnipeg, Manitoba, with reception in both Regina and Saskatoon (though reception in Saskatoon was initially spotty, with the city not receiving CBKFT's complete broadcast schedule at first). In 1985, CBKFT was granted a licence with 11 new transmitters and began operating as its own television station separate from CBWFT.

Initially the station was based solely out of Regina, but it now has studio facilities in the Hutchinson Building in Saskatoon; the same building as the now-defunct English-language CBC station CBKST, which closed in July 2012.

== Technical information ==
=== Subchannel ===
Subchannel of CBKFT-DT
Channel	Res.	Short name	Programming
13.1	720p		Ici Radio-Canada Télé

=== Analog-to-digital conversion ===
On August 31, 2011, when Canadian television stations in CRTC-designated mandatory markets transitioned from analog to digital broadcasts, CBKFT flash cut its digital signal into operation on VHF channel 13 in order for those repeaters/stations to avoid interference from the Regina and Saskatoon stations. Through the use of PSIP, television receivers will list CBKFT-DT's virtual channel number as 13.1.

CBC had originally decided that none of its rebroadcasters will transition to digital. Also, the CBC had originally planned to not convert any non-originating stations in mandatory markets to digital, which would have forced CBKFT-1 in Saskatoon to sign off on the transition date. On August 16, 2011, the CRTC granted the CBC permission to continue operating 22 repeaters in mandatory markets, including CBKFT-1, in analog until August 31, 2012, by which time the transmitter had to convert to digital or shut down. (Lloydminster, another mandatory market, had no local Radio-Canada transmitter.)

=== Former transmitters ===
CBKFT operated 12 analog over-the-air television rebroadcasters broadcasting in Saskatchewan. Due to federal funding reductions to the CBC, in April 2012, the CBC responded with substantial budget cuts, which included shutting down CBC's and Radio-Canada's remaining analog transmitters on July 31, 2012. None of CBC or Radio-Canada's television rebroadcasters were converted to digital.

City of license	Callsign	Channel
Bellegarde	CBKFT-9	26 (UHF)
Debden	CBKFT-3	22 (UHF)
Gravelbourg	CBKFT-6	39 (UHF)
Leoville	CBKFT-11	31 (UHF)
Moose Jaw	CBKFT-10	16 (UHF)
North Battleford	CBKFT-12	41 (UHF)
Ponteix	CBKFT-7	22 (UHF)
Prince Albert	CBKFT-2	3 (VHF)
Saskatoon	CBKFT-1	13 (VHF)
St. Brieux	CBKFT-4	8 (VHF)
Willow Bunch	CBKFT-8	21 (UHF)
Zenon Park	CBKFT-5	21 (UHF)

== See also ==
- CBKT-DT
- Fransaskois
