= CBK-FM =

CBC Music station in Regina, Saskatchewan

- Regina, Saskatchewan; Canada
- Broadcast area: Southern Saskatchewan
- Frequency: 96.9 MHz (FM)

Programming
- Format: Adult contemporary/Public music
- Network: CBC Music

Ownership
- Owner: Canadian Broadcasting Corporation
- Sister stations: CBK, CBKF-FM, CBKT-DT, CBKFT-DT

History
- First air date: May 1, 1977
- Call sign meaning: Canadian Broadcasting Corporation, Henry Kelsey

Technical information
- Class: C
- ERP: 100 kW horizontal 23.5 kW vertical
- HAAT: 146.2 metres (480 ft)

Links
- Website: CBC Saskatchewan

CBK-FM is a Canadian radio station, which broadcasts the programming of the CBC Music network at 96.9 FM in Regina, Saskatchewan.

The station was launched on May 1, 1977. Its studios are at the CBC Regina Broadcast Centre, 2440 Broad Street in Regina, along with CBK and CBKT-DT.

== Rebroadcasters ==
Rebroadcasters of CBK-FM
City of licence	Identifier	Frequency	Power	Class	RECNet	CRTC Decision	Notes
North Battleford	CBK-FM-5	99.9 FM	20,000 watts	B	Query	2006-222	52°52′5.88″N 108°26′9.60″W
Prince Albert	CBK-FM-1	89.1 FM	20,000 watts	B	Query	2000-305	53°3′27″N 105°50′34.80″W
Saskatoon	CBKS-FM	105.5 FM	98,000 watts	C	Query		52°10′27.84″N 106°26′6″W
Swift Current	CBK-FM-4	95.7 FM	4,710 watts	B1	Query	2005-141	50°20′20.04″N 107°47′27.60″W
Warmley (Weyburn/Estevan)	CBK-FM-2	101.5 FM	100,000 watts	C	Query	2005-72	49°48′37.08″N 102°41′16.80″W
Yorkton	CBK-FM-3	91.7 FM	25,000 watts	C1	Query	2005-115	51°12′33.12″N 102°44′2.40″W
