= CBK (AM) =

Radio station in Saskatchewan, Canada

- Watrous, Saskatchewan; Canada
- Broadcast area: Southern and Central Saskatchewan
- Frequency: 540 kHz

Programming
- Format: News/Talk
- Network: CBC Radio One

Ownership
- Owner: Canadian Broadcasting Corporation
- Sister stations: CBK-FM, CBKF-FM, CBKT-DT, CBKFT-DT, CBKST (defunct)

History
- First air date: July 29, 1939
- Call sign meaning: Canadian Broadcasting Corporation, K for Henry Kelsey

Technical information
- Class: A (clear-channel)
- Power: 50,000 watts
- Transmitter coordinates: 51°40′48″N 105°26′48″W

Links
- Website: CBC Saskatchewan

CBK (540 kHz) is a Canadian public radio station licensed to Watrous, Saskatchewan. It broadcasts the CBC Radio One network as a Class A clear-channel AM station powered at 50,000 watts around the clock from a non-directional antenna near Watrous.

Its studios are located at the CBC's broadcast centre at 2440 Broad Street in Regina, with an additional bureau in the Saskatoon Co-op building on 4th Avenue South in Saskatoon. The Regina facility also houses CBK-FM and CBKT-DT. In Regina, a nested rebroadcaster, CBKR-FM 102.5 MHz, simulcasts CBK for listeners who may have trouble receiving the 540 AM signal amid downtown office and apartment buildings.

Due to CBK's low frequency, transmitter power, and Saskatchewan's flat land (with excellent ground conductivity), its daytime signal reaches most of the southern two-thirds of Saskatchewan, including Regina, Saskatoon, Yorkton, Swift Current, Lloydminster, Moose Jaw and Prince Albert. It also provides grade B coverage as far west as Calgary and as far east as Winnipeg, and reaches across the border into North Dakota and Montana. At night, it can be heard across much of the western half of North America with a good radio, but is strongest in Western Canada and the North-Central and Northwestern United States.

== History ==
CBK officially opened during an evening ceremony in Watrous on July 29, 1939. The K in the station's call sign honours Henry Kelsey, an English fur trader, explorer, and sailor who was the first recorded European to have visited what is now Saskatchewan.

CBC engineers deliberately chose to place the station's transmission facilities near Watrous in order to provide the best possible broadcast signal to the densely populated portion of Saskatchewan, including the cities of Regina and Saskatoon. Watrous is located about 150 kilometres (93 mi) northwest of Regina and about 100 kilometres (62 mi) southeast of Saskatoon in an area where potash-rich soil provides especially good ground conductivity, an important component in determining the strength and reach of an AM radio station's daytime ground wave signal. Additionally, Watrous, in particular, was an advantageous location due to being on the main line of the Canadian National Railway, whose telecommunications infrastructure was used to deliver content to CBC radio stations before the creation of the Trans Canada Microwave system.

Because of the factors making the CBK signal particularly strong, the station was originally intended as the CBC's clear-channel station for the Prairies, broadcasting the full CBC radio schedule together with privately owned affiliates in the region broadcasting portions of the schedule (clear-channel CKY in Winnipeg—now CBW—was one such affiliate at the time). The strong daytime signal also spills into the United States and was initially the only radio station receivable during the daytime in parts of North Dakota and Montana.

For most of World War II, CBK aired programming in both English and French. The French programming was prepared at CBK by a two-person crew and included newscasts, musical programs, and transcriptions of CBC programming produced in Montreal.

At the start, CBK had no physical presence in Saskatchewan beyond Watrous. Although privately owned CBC affiliates in the province occasionally originated programming to be aired over the full CBC network including CBK, CBK was initially a pass-through for programming fed from Toronto. Starting in 1948, its programming was fed from Winnipeg. The station's first full production studio within Saskatchewan opened on October 1, 1954, in Regina. An additional studio facility opened in Saskatoon following the sign-on of television station CBKST. In 1980, CBK's regional weekday morning program began to be hosted simultaneously from both Regina and Saskatoon.

On June 4, 1976, CBK's tower was toppled by strong winds during a severe thunderstorm. CBK's staff went back on the air in the cities of Regina and Saskatoon by temporarily taking over CBC's low-powered FM transmitters normally used to air French language programming. Within a few days, the 540 kHz signal was restored using a temporary tower while a new permanent one was built. The replacement tower was completed in 1983 and, like the original, is a quarter-wave monopole antenna 141.7 metres (465 ft) tall.

The station's original mercury vapour tube transmitter manufactured by RCA was replaced in 1975 by a Continental Electronics transmitter, which could be monitored and controlled remotely from Regina. In 1988, a Nautel solid-state transmitter was added.

== Transmitter building ==
One of the station's distinctive features was its 70.2 m^{2} (756 sq ft) Art Deco transmitter building located just east of Watrous on Agnes Street. Until operations became nearly completely automated from Regina with the addition of the solid-state transmitter in the 1980s, the building was staffed by CBC personnel, for whom the CBC had company housing built in Watrous. Before automation, and with the exception of during World War II when armed guards patrolled the property, the building was routinely open for the public to tour.

The building itself was designed by the CBC's architecture department. It was two storeys tall (of four split-levels) and had a white stucco exterior with blue trim. Inside, the transmitter and its control room were prominently displayed in the centre. The original RCA transmitter contained a 12.2-metre (40 ft) long red-and-chrome façade, visible from a gallery accessible to visitors, and was set atop a linoleum floor depicting a map of Canada marking the locations and call signs of all CBC-owned and affiliated radio stations in the country as of 1939.

The transmitter and control room were flanked by a small studio to keep the station on air in the event of an emergency, a studio control room, a workshop, a stenographer's office, and storage space. For the use of CBC personnel employed at the facility, the building also contained a heated, two-car garage and emergency living quarters consisting of bunk beds, a kitchenette, and a living room. In the mid-1960s, the living quarters were expanded with the addition of a two-person underground fallout shelter containing duplicated transmitter controls and a small studio to be used to broadcast news in the event of a nuclear attack. A backup electrical generator with fuel tank ensured that the station could remain on air for weeks without power and under control from inside the fallout shelter. The living quarters and emergency broadcast capabilities were briefly reactivated in late 1999 to provide contingency in the event of the year 2000 problem interrupting normal operations.

The design of the building included a number of technological innovations for its time, including air conditioning, special "dust and water proof" double-paned windows, and a unique transmitter cooling system involving the use of over 3,400 litres (900 US gal) of water per hour flowing through the chamber housing the tubes and exiting through to sprayers on the building's copper roof, where water sprayed to a depth of as much as 23 centimetres (9 in) was allowed to evaporate to further counteract the heat generated by the transmitter.

In 2007, the transmitter was moved into a steel shed next to the transmitting antenna. Having been made redundant, the original transmitter building fell into disrepair. While there was an effort by a local heritage committee in Watrous to preserve the building as an historic site, the high cost of removing dangerous interior materials such as asbestos and lead paint made this unfeasible, and the CBC decided to demolish the building in the summer of 2015. Before demolition, the heritage committee salvaged components and artifacts for preservation. A 2019 revitalization plan for the communities of Watrous and Manitou Beach called for potentially building a replica of the building at some point in the future.

== Local programming ==
CBK and its repeater stations air several local shows, in addition to CBC network programming. Weekdays begin with The Morning Edition. At noon, Blue Sky is heard and in afternoon drive time, The 306 is broadcast. Saturday and Sunday mornings, Saskatchewan Weekend airs.

In Saskatoon, CBK-1-FM 94.1 has carried its own local morning program, Saskatoon Morning, in place of the Regina-based wake up show The Morning Edition, since 2013. It airs from the CBC's Saskatoon bureau in the Affinity Building at 100-128 4th Avenue South in downtown Saskatoon. Saskatoon Morning began streaming online on April 29, and began airing on 94.1 in September after the CBC won Canadian Radio-television and Telecommunications Commission approval to move the program over-the-air. For the rest of its broadcasting day, CBK-FM-1 carries the same programming as CBK.

== Rebroadcasters ==
In 2000, the CBC opened a local FM repeater of CBK in Regina, CBKR-FM 102.5. In 2006, a Saskatoon repeater was added, CBK-1-FM 94.1. Like other Radio One stations on the AM band, CBK's main signal had long been plagued with reception problems in Regina and Saskatoon, particularly in buildings.

CBK has the following direct rebroadcasters.

Rebroadcasters of CBK
| City of licence | Identifier | Frequency | RECNet | CRTC Decision | Notes |
|---|---|---|---|---|---|
| Regina | CBKR-FM | 102.5 FM | Query | 99-459 | 50°28′58.08″N 104°30′21.60″W |
| Saskatoon | CBK-1-FM | 94.1 FM | Query | 2006-84 | 52°5′9.96″N 106°40′8.40″W |

Though separately licensed, CBKA-FM in La Ronge is a full-time satellite of CBK. Until 2009, that station produced its own noon-hour show and regional news updates, although it aired both The Morning Edition and The Afternoon Edition.
