= CKOS-TV =

Television station in Yorkton (1958–2002)

Yorkton, Saskatchewan; Canada
- Channels: Analog: 5 (VHF)

Programming
- Affiliations: CBC Television

Ownership
- Owner: Yorkton Television (1958–1986); Baton Broadcasting/CTV Inc. (1986–2002)
- Sister stations: CICC-TV

History
- First air date: June 19, 1958
- Last air date: October 27, 2002
- Former channel numbers: 3 (VHF, 1958–1978)

Technical information
- ERP: 50.2 kW
- HAAT: 170.2 m (558 ft)
- Transmitter coordinates: 51°12′33″N 102°44′1″W

CKOS-TV (channel 5) was a television station in Yorkton, Saskatchewan, Canada. The station was in operation from 1958 to 2002 as a private affiliate of CBC Television. It was a twinstick with the city's CTV affiliate CICC-TV.

== History ==
In March 1959, in response to CKX-TV's announcement that it would extend its signal further north, Harold Olson, director of Yorkton Television said his company's plans called for extension of CKOS' signal to the Manitoba communities of Dauphin, Swan River and Baldy Mountain.

Yorkton subsequently opened CICC-TV in 1974. In 1984, Yorkton Television also purchased CKBI-TV in Prince Albert. In 1986, Yorkton was acquired by Baton Broadcasting, which became the sole corporate owner of CTV in 1997.

In 2002, CTV sold CKBI-TV and CKOS-TV to the Canadian Broadcasting Corporation, which converted both to rebroadcasters of Regina CBC station CBKT, and surrendered both of the old call signs, with CKOS-TV's call sign changed to CBKT-6. These translators would close on July 31, 2012, due to budget cuts affecting the CBC.
