= Henry Kelsey =

English explorer and fur trader

- Kelsey (third from left) witnessing buffalo on the Great Plains in 1691
- Born: Unknown date, c. 1664; East Greenwich, England
- Died: 1 November 1724 (aged 56–57); East Greenwich, England
- Occupations: Explorer, fur trader, sailor
- Employer: Hudson's Bay Company
- Known for: First European to visit present-day Saskatchewan

Henry Kelsey (c. 1664 – 1 November 1724) was an English fur trader, explorer, and sailor who played an important role in establishing the Hudson's Bay Company in Canada. He is the first recorded European to have visited the present-day provinces of Saskatchewan and, possibly, Alberta, as well as the first to have explored the Great Plains from the north. In his travels to the plains he encountered several Plains First Nations, as well as vast herds of the American bison, their primary source of food.

== Early life and career ==
Kelsey was born and married in East Greenwich, south-east of central London.

Kelsey was apprenticed in London at age 17 to the Hudson's Bay Company (HBC) and departed England for Canada on 6 May 1684. He was posted at a fort on Hudson's Bay near present-day York Factory, Manitoba, near the mouth of the Nelson River on Hudson Bay. Kelsey started exploring in the winter of 1688–1689 when he and a First Nations boy carried mail overland 200 miles southeast from Fort York to Fort Severn, another HBC post. He was described as "a very active Lad delighting much in Indians' company, being never better pleased than when he is traveling among them." In the summer of 1689, Kelsey and the same First Nations boy tried to find First Nations north of the Churchill River to open trade with them. Kelsey travelled inland for about 235 miles north of the Churchill, but returned without having any success.

== Travel to the Great Plains ==
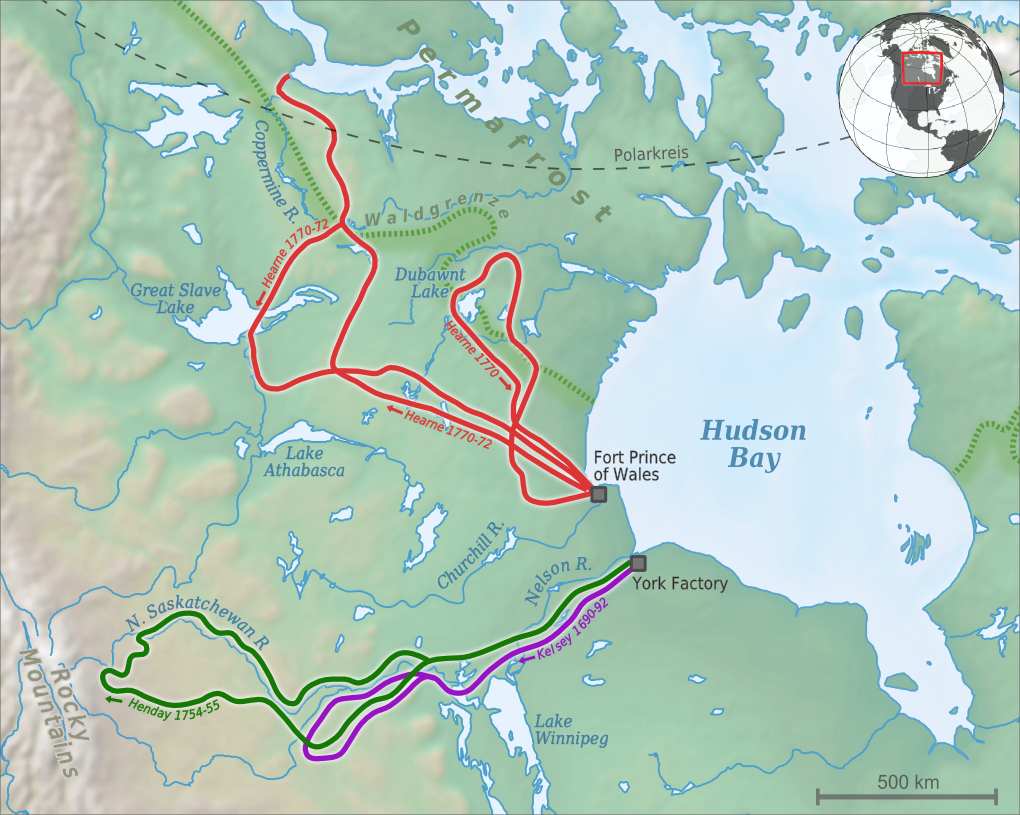
Henry Kelsey's possible route to the Great Plains is shown in purple on the map.

In 1690, HBC governor at York Factory, George Geyer, sent Kelsey on a journey up the Nelson River "to call, encourage, and invite the remoter [First Nations people] to a trade with us." Beaver pelts were the item most desired by the HBC. Kelsey left York Factory on 12 June 1690 with a group of indigenous people and proceeded by canoe up the Nelson River (southwest). He carried with him a sample of hatchets, beads, and tobacco the company offered. Kelsey and the First Nations people reached a place he named Deering's Point, probably near present-day The Pas, Manitoba, on 10 July after a journey of 600 miles; they had passed through five lakes and undertaken 33 portages. Deering's Point became a gathering place for First Nations people who journeyed down the Nelson River to trade at York Factory. Kelsey sent a letter, carried by First Nations people, back to York Factory with his observations about the journey and the First Nations people he had met. He said that the various indigenous nations were continually at war with each other, which hindered prospects for trade. Kelsey spent the winter near Deering's Point.

In spring 1691, Kelsey received a supply of trade goods from York Factory; his orders were to obtain what beaver pelts he could and to return the following year with as many First Nations people as possible to introduce them to the trading post. On 15 July 1691, he set out from Deering's Point "to discover and bring to commerce the "Naywatame poets," an Indian people of the Great Plains. (Another source mentions the presence of the "Esinepoets" people (Assiniboine) on the Prairie about that time.)

At Deering's Point, Kelsey was still in the austere Taiga boreal forest of northern Canada. His apparent goal was to reach the First Nations people of the richer lands of the Aspen Parkland and prairies to his south and west. Accompanied by Cree, Kelsey ascended the Carrot River by canoe, crossed into present-day Saskatchewan, then continued on foot to a point northwest of present-day Yorkton, entering the aspen parkland. Kelsey's route was probably via several well-travelled foot trails. Entering the aspen parkland, possibly near the Touchwood Hills, he encountered the Assiniboine, a buffalo-hunting people of the Great Plains. The Assiniboine and other peoples of the region were still on foot at this time, the later horse culture of the Plains tribes not having yet reached Canada.

On 20 August, Kelsey described a "great store of buffalo" and "silver-haired" bears, the first sightings by a European of buffalo and grizzly bears on the northern Great Plains. His party had gone hungry during their ascent of the journey through the taiga, but now Kelsey and his indigenous companions feasted on buffalo. Kelsey also noted the abundance of beaver in the many ponds and lakes of the aspen parkland. Continuing his journey, possibly to a point south and west of Saskatoon, Kelsey tried to make peace between the Assiniboine and their neighbours, the Naywatame poets. It is unclear who the Naywatame were; Kelsey commented "they knew not the use of canoes," which indicates that they were Plains Indians.

Scholars have advanced several theories as to the identity of the Naywatame. On linguistic grounds, they are proposed to be Siouan, possibly Stoney or another people closely related to the Assiniboine. Identification of them as Hidatsa or Mandan is proposed, although those tribes were resident 300 miles further south along the Missouri River in North Dakota. Possibly they were Gros Ventre or Blackfeet, Algonquin speakers who were discovered living in this region by later explorers in the 18th and 19th centuries.

Kelsey's peace initiatives failed, and he was unable to open trade relations with the Naywatame. They were afraid to make a journey across enemy Assiniboine territory to go to York Factory. Kelsey wintered with the Indians and returned to York Factory in the summer of 1692, accompanied by numerous Assiniboine and Cree eager for trade with the HBC.

== Later life ==
Kelsey returned to England in 1693, reenlisted in 1694 and returned to York Factory. In 1694 and again in 1697, York Factory was captured by the French. Kelsey returned to England at these times, on the second occasion as a prisoner of the French. In 1698, he went back to the New World, this time to Fort Albany on James Bay.

In 1701, he became master of a trading frigate, the Knight, in Hudson Bay, continuing the trade in beaver pelts. In 1703, he returned for a time to England. In 1705 Kelsey went back to Fort Albany as chief trader. In 1712, he returned again to England.

In 1714 he made his sixth journey across the Atlantic Ocean, appointed as Deputy Governor of York Factory, which the British had recaptured from the French. In 1717, he was appointed as Governor of York Factory and in 1718 as Governor of all the Hudson's Bay settlements. In 1719 and 1721, he undertook missions to the Arctic, where he met with Inuit and searched for copper deposits.

In 1722, Kelsey was recalled to England.

Various publications have been derived from his writings:

- Henry T. Epp, editor. Three hundred prairie years: Henry Kelsey's "inland country of good report," Regina: Canadian Plains Research Center, University of Regina, 1993 (xi, 238p.)
- The Kelsey Papers La Collection Kelsey. Kelsey, Henry (c. 1670 – c. 1724); Doughty, Arthur George (Sir) (1860-1936) (introduction); Martin, Chester Bailey (1882-1958) (introduction). Ottawa: Public Archives of Canada and Public Record Office of North Ireland, 1929.
- A dictionary of the Hudson's-Bay Indian language. London: s.n, 1700? (Kelsey's authorship unproven)
- The journal of Henry Kelsey (1691-1692): The first white man to reach the Saskatchewan River from Hudson Bay, and the first to see the buffalo-grizzly bear of the Canadian plains: With notes on some other experiences of the man. Kelsey, Henry. Winnipeg: Dawson Richardson Publications, 1928.

He died on 1 November 1724 and was buried on 2 November 1724 in St Alfege Church, Greenwich. He was distinguished for his ability to establish good relations with Indians, which enabled him to be mostly successful as a trader.

== Honours ==
In 1931, Kelsey was recognized as a Person of National Historic Significance by the government of Canada. A plaque commemorating this can be found at Devon Park in The Pas, Manitoba.

Numerous places and institutions have been named in his honour.

- Kelsey Generating Station. The Kelsey Dam and GS is the first hydro station built on the Nelson River. It was started in 1957. It is a major station with 7 turbines and a total capacity of 290 MW.
- Kelsey Lake in Manitoba, just south of The Pas.
- Kelsey Sportswear Ltd in Winnipeg, Manitoba, is a manufacturer of Men's and Ladies outerwear, est. 1968. In honour of Henry Kelsey's expeditions, Kelsey Sportswear brands their outerwear as Kelsey Trail. Kelsey Sportswear's other brands include, KELTEK Safety Apparel and WORKTEK.
- Henry Kelsey Senior Public School in Scarborough, now part of the City of Toronto.
- Kelsey Park in Saskatoon.
- Kelsey Hall, one of the residence towers in the main student residence complex at the University of Alberta in Edmonton.
- Canada Post issued a 6¢ postage stamp in 1970 entitled "Henry Kelsey, first explorer of the Plains".
- The Saskatchewan Institute of Applied Science and Technology or SIAST (abbv.) named its Saskatoon campus for Kelsey.
- The Rural Municipality of Kelsey in Northern Manitoba.
- The Kelsey Recreation Centre in The Pas, Manitoba.
- The call letters for CBC radio in Saskatchewan are CBK; the K stands for Kelsey.
- The French-immersion Kelsey Elementary School (K–8) in Saskatoon.
- The Henry Kelsey rose, part of the Explorer rose series developed by Agriculture and Agri-Food Canada, was named for him.
- Big Game Records, the Henry Kelsey Awards, are the official Big Game records of the province of Saskatchewan, Canada.
- A commemorative dollar coin of Canada, minted in 1990.

He was also referenced in the song Northwest Passage by Stan Rogers as "Brave Kelso". Rogers confessed in an interview in 1982 that during the writing of the song, he had not been sure of Kelsey's name, and had guessed it was "Kelso" when recording the song.

Information concerning Kelsey in print include:

- LONG, Morden H. Knights Errant of the Wilderness. Tales of the Explorers of the Great North-West
- Whillans, James W., First in the West: The Story of Henry Kelsey, Discoverer of Canadian Prairies
- Knox, Olive. Little Giant. The Story of Henry Kelsey
- Whyte, Jon. Homage Henry Kelsey A Poem in Five Parts.
- Conner, Daniel C.G. (with Doreen Bethune-Johnson). Henry Kelsey and the People of the Plains (Publisher series: Native People and Explorers of Canada Series)
- Wolfart, H.C. Linguistic Studies Presented to John L. Finlay Memoir 8 Algonquian and Iroquoian Linguistics (contains "Henry Kelsey's Christmas Message, 1696"), 1991.
