= CBKT-DT =

Television station in Regina, Saskatchewan

- Regina, Saskatchewan; Canada
- Channels: Digital: 9 (VHF); Virtual: 9
- Branding: CBC Saskatchewan

Programming
- Affiliations: 9.1: CBC Television

Ownership
- Owner: Canadian Broadcasting Corporation
- Sister stations: CBKFT-DT, CBK, CBK-FM, CBKF-FM

History
- First air date: December 21, 1962
- Former call signs: CHRE-TV (1962–1969); CBKRT (1969–1978); CBKT (1978–2011)
- Former channel numbers: Analog: 9 (VHF, 1962–2011)
- Former affiliations: CTV (1962–1969)
- Call sign meaning: CBC Henry Kelsey Television

Technical information
- Licensing authority: CRTC
- ERP: 60 kW
- HAAT: 207.2 m (680 ft)
- Transmitter coordinates: 50°28′58″N 104°30′20″W

Links
- Website: CBC Saskatchewan

CBKT-DT (channel 9) is a CBC Television station in Regina, Saskatchewan, Canada. It is part of a twinstick with Ici Radio-Canada Télé station CBKFT-DT (channel 13). The two outlets share studios with sister radio stations CBK, CBK-FM and CBKF-FM at the CBC Regina Broadcast Centre at 2440 Broad Street in Downtown Regina; CBKT-DT's transmitter is located near McDonald Street/Highway 46, just northeast of Regina proper.

== History ==
CBKT signed on for the first time on December 21, 1962 as CHRE-TV, a semi-satellite of CHAB-TV in Moose Jaw and an affiliate of CTV. CHRE signed on as part of a deal between CHAB-TV and Regina's original station, CKCK-TV, which allowed CTV to come to Saskatchewan for the first time. On the same day CHRE signed on, CKCK-TV opened a rebroadcaster in Moose Jaw. During the latter half of the 1960s, the station generally branded itself as "Channel 9".

On May 30, 1968, controlling interest in CHAB Ltd., owner of CHAB-AM-TV and CHRE, was transferred to Moffat Broadcasting, owner of Winnipeg's CTV affiliate, CJAY (channel 7, now CKY-DT). The Canadian Radio-television and Telecommunications Commission (CRTC), however, told Moffat to sell CHAB-TV and CHRE to a new owner within one year. Moffat tried to sell CHAB and CHRE to Western Broadcast Management Ltd., owner of CHAN-TV in Vancouver. However, the CRTC denied this bid on July 18, 1969 in favour of a counteroffer from the CBC. On September 13, CBC officially assumed control of CHRE and CHAB and moved its programming there, while CKCK became the sole CTV outlet in southern Saskatchewan. CBC made the Regina station the main station, and changed the call letters of the stations to CBKRT and CBKMT respectively. After the switch to the CBC, the brand used was "9&4" or "CBC 9&4", to signify both the Regina and Moose Jaw channel numbers.

The station received its current call letters on July 31, 1978. On the same day, CBKMT's licence was merged with that of CBKT; its transmitter operated as a full-time rebroadcaster, CBKT-1. The CHRE calls are now used on a radio station in St. Catharines, Ontario, owned by Bell Media. After a brief flirtation with "TV9 Regina", the station returned to the "9&4" brand in the 1980s, this time to signify the station's cable channel position. Today the station is branded just as "CBC" or "CBC Saskatchewan", as it has since the early 1990s, when the latter branding was introduced to signify the inclusion of not only the main station but also its rebroadcasters across the province, including Moose Jaw and Saskatoon. In 2002, CBC purchased former privately owned affiliates CJFB-TV in Swift Current and CKOS-TV in Yorkton, turning both into rebroadcasters of CBKT.

== Newscasts ==
CBKT-DT presently broadcasts 8 hours, 50 minutes of locally produced newscasts each week (with 2 hours, 10 minutes each weekday); unlike most CBC stations, CBKT does not air local newscasts on weekends. The station airs local news programming on weekdays, covering stories in Regina, Saskatoon, Swift Current, Yorkton and Prince Albert. The station broadcasts a 30-minute early evening newscast, with a short ten-minute newscast at 11 p.m. following The National.

=== Notable former on-air staff ===
- Sheldon Turcott

== Technical information ==
=== Subchannel ===
Subchannel of CBKT-DT
| Channel | Res. | Short name | Programming |
|---|---|---|---|
| 9.1 | 720p | | CBC |

=== Analog-to-digital conversion ===
On August 31, 2011, when Canadian television stations in CRTC-designated mandatory markets transitioned from analog to digital broadcasts, CBKT flash cut its digital signal into operation on VHF channel 9.

=== Transmitters ===
CBKT operated 14 analog over-the-air television rebroadcasters broadcasting in southern Saskatchewan in communities such as Moose Jaw, Swift Current and Yorkton. Additionally, CBKST in Saskatoon and its network of over 20 associated transmitters were officially licensed as rebroadcasters of CBKT. At CBC's request, CBKST's licence was revoked effective August 1, 2012. Due to federal funding reductions to the CBC, in April 2012, the CBC responded with substantial budget cuts, which included shutting down CBC's and Radio-Canada's remaining analog transmitters on July 31, 2012.

== See also ==
- List of CBC television stations
