= List of television stations in Ontario =

This is a list of broadcast television stations serving cities in the Canadian province of Ontario. Note: Due to the mandatory digital television transition on August 31, 2011, most of these stations are broadcasting in digital only.

City of licence	Analog channel	Digital channel	VC	Callsign	Network	Notes
Barrie		9	3.1	CKVR-DT	CTV 2	
Belleville		26	53.1	CICO-DT-53	TVO	
Brighton		30	66.1	CKWS-DT	Global	satellite of CKWS-TV Kingston
Chatham		28	32.1	CICO-DT-59	TVO	
Cornwall	8	No		CJOH-TV-8	CTV	satellite of CJOH-TV ch. 13 Ottawa, formerly CJSS-TV. Defunct - Transmitter turned off July 2017 (rather than upgrade to digital)
Cloyne		44	55.1	CICO-DT-92	TVO	Currently On Uhf 21
Fonthill		42	42.1	CKVP-DT	CTV 2	satellite of CKVR-DT established September 2013 Currently On Uhf 29
Hamilton		15	11.1	CHCH-DT	CHCH-DT	moved to UHF in December 2013
Hamilton		35	35.1	CHCJ-DT	CTV 2	satellite of CKVR-DT established September 2013
Hamilton		14	14.1	CITS-DT	Yes TV	
Kenora	13	No		CJBN-TV	Global	Defunct - off-air at midnight on January 27, 2017.
Kingston		11	11.1	CKWS-DT	Global	
Kitchener		22	22.1	CICO-DT-28	TVO	
Kitchener		13	13.1	CKCO-DT	CTV	
Leamington		33	22.1	CIII-DT-22	Global	Licensed to Stevenson, serving Leamington and Chatham
Leamington		30	34.1	CFTV-DT	community channel	airs four digital subchannels (Community Channel on 34.1, French and Spanish Community on 34.2, Caldwell First Nation programming on 34.3 and Local News on 34.4), the first station in Canada to offer multiple digital subchannels, and the first low-power broadcaster/community channel in Canada to convert to digital operations.
London		10	10.1	CFPL-DT	CTV 2	
London		19	19.1	CITS-DT-2	Yes TV	
London		18	18.1	CICO-DT-18	TVO	
London		29	69.1	CFMT-DT-1	Omni Television	
London		20	20.1	CJMT-DT-1	Omni Television	
London		14	51.1	CHCH-DT-2	CHCH-TV	Transmitter located in Alvinston
Midland		7	7.1	CIII-DT-7	Global	satellite of CIII-TV
Muskoka		23	11.1	CHCH-DT-3	CHCH-DT	
North Bay		15	2.1	CFGC-DT-2	Global	satellite of CIII-TV ch. 6 Paris/Toronto
North Bay		12	10.1	CKNY-DT	CTV	
North Bay	32	No		CHCH-DT-6	CHCH-DT	
Oil Springs/Sarnia		35	29.1	CIII-DT-29	Global	satellite of CIII-TV ch. 6 Paris/Toronto
Orillia		21	21.1	CFTO-DT-21	CTV	satellite of CFTO-DT ch. 9 Toronto
Oshawa	22	48		CHEX-TV-2	Global	Currently On Uhf 29
Ottawa		25	4.1	CBOT-DT	CBC	
Ottawa		14	6.1	CIII-DT-6	Global	
Ottawa		33	9.1	CBOFT-DT	Ici Radio-Canada Télé	
Ottawa		22	11.1	CHCH-DT-1	CHCH-DT	
Ottawa		13	13.1	CJOH-DT	CTV	
Ottawa		20	14.1	CJMT-DT-2	Omni Television	
Ottawa		15	15.1	CITS-DT-1	Yes TV	
Ottawa		24	24.1	CICO-DT-24	TVO	satellite of CICA-TV ch. 19 Toronto
Ottawa		43	43.1	CHRO-DT-2	CTV 2	Currently On Uhf 35
Ottawa		27	60.1	CFMT-DT-2	Omni Television	
Ottawa		17	65.1	CITY-DT-3	Citytv	
Paris		23	6.1	CIII-DT	Global	Moved from VHF to UHF in July 2013
Pembroke	5	No		CHRO-DT	CTV 2	
Peterborough		12	12.1	CHEX-DT	Global	
Peterborough		27	27.1	CIII-DT-27	Global	satellite of CIII-TV
Peterborough		35	54.1	CFTO-DT-54	CTV	
Sault Ste. Marie	2	No		CHBX-TV	CTV	
Sault Ste. Marie		15	12.1	CIII-DT-12	Global	satellite of CIII-TV ch. 41 Toronto
Sault Ste. Marie	20	No		CICO-DT-20	TVO	Defunct - all remaining TVO analog transmitters were shut down in August 2013
Sault Ste. Marie	38	No		CHCH-DT-5	CHCH-DT	
Sudbury		No		CICI-TV	CTV	
Sudbury		11		CFGC-DT	Global	satellite of CIII-DT ch. 41 Toronto
Sudbury	25	No		CHLF-TV-1	TFO	Defunct - all TFO transmitters were shut down in August 2013
Sudbury	41	No		CHCH-DT-4	CHCH-DT	
Thunder Bay		2	2.1	CKPR-DT	CTV	
Thunder Bay		4	4.1	CHFD-DT	Global	
Thunder Bay		9	9.1	CICO-TV-9	TVO	satellite of CICA-TV ch. 19 Toronto
Timmins	3	No		CITO-TV	CTV	
Timmins	11	No		CHCH-TV-7	CHCH-DT	
Timmins		13	13.1	CIII-TV-13	Global	satellite of CIII-TV
Toronto		20	5.1	CBLT	CBC	
Toronto		8	9.1	CFTO-DT	CTV	
Toronto		19	19.1	CICA-TV	TVO	
Toronto		25	25.1	CBLFT-DT	Ici Radio-Canada Télé	
Toronto		40	40.1	CJMT-DT	Omni Television	retired 69.1 virtual channel when physical channel changed from 51 to 40 Currently On Uhf 26
Toronto		41	41.1	CIII-TV-41	Global	satellite of CIII-TV ch. 6 Paris/Toronto Currently On Uhf 17
Toronto		47	47.1	CFMT-DT	Omni Television	Currently On Uhf 30
Toronto		44	57.1	CITY-DT	Citytv	Currently On Uhf 18
Wheatley		16	16.1	CHWI-DT	CTV 2	Broadcasts from Stevenson, northeast of Wheatley, serving Chatham–Kent, Leamington, and Essex County
Windsor		9	9.1	CBET-DT	CBC	Broadcasts from McGregor, Ontario
Windsor		19	19.1	CICO-TV-32	TVO	Broadcasts from McGregor, Ontario
Windsor		17	26.1	CHWI-TV-60	CTV 2	Broadcasts from Victoria Park Place apartment tower, in Downtown Windsor
Wingham	8	No		CKNX-TV	CTV Two	
Woodstock	31	31	31.1	CITY-DT-2	CITY-DT	

== Defunct stations ==
- Channel 4: CHNB-TV - CBC - North Bay
- Channel 5: CJIC-TV - CBC - Sault Ste. Marie
- Channel 9: CKNC-TV - CBC - Sudbury
- Channel 6: CFCL-TV - CBC - Timmins
- Channel 8: CJSS-TV - CBC - Cornwall (1959-1963; later became rebroadcaster of CJOH-TV in Ottawa)
- Channel 19: CKXT-DT-2 - Sun News Network - London (rebroadcaster of CKXT-TV Toronto)
- Channel 20: CKXT-DT-3 - Sun News Network - Ottawa (rebroadcaster of CKXT-TV Toronto)
- Channel 20: CBLN-TV-5 - CBC - Wiarton (rebroadcaster of CBLT Toronto)
- Channel 23: CBLN - CBC - London (rebroadcaster of CBLT Toronto)
- Channel 29: CBLN-TV-1 - CBC - Kitchener (rebroadcaster of CBLT Toronto)
- Channel 34: CBLN-TV-2 - CBC - Oil Springs/Sarnia (rebroadcaster of CBLT Toronto)
- Channel 35: CBEFT - SRC - Windsor (rebroadcaster of CBLFT Toronto)
- Channel 42: CKCO-DT-3 - CTV - Oil Springs/Sarnia (rebroadcaster of CKCO-DT Kitchener)
- Channel 44: CBLN-TV-6 - CBC - Normandale (rebroadcaster of CBLT Toronto)
- Channel 45: CKXT-DT-1 - Sun News Network - Hamilton (rebroadcaster of CKXT-TV Toronto)
- Channel 45: CBLN-TV-4 - CBC - Wingham (rebroadcaster of CBLT Toronto)
- Channel 52: CKXT-DT - Sun News Network - Toronto
- Channel 55: CBLN-TV-3 - CBC - Chatham (rebroadcaster of CBLT Toronto)

== See also ==
- List of television stations in Canada
- Media in Canada
