= Media in Timmins =

Media of Timmins, Ontario includes:

== Radio ==
With the launch of CFCL in 1952, Timmins became home to the first French-language radio station in Ontario. (The first French-language radio station in Canada outside of Quebec, CKSB, was launched in 1946 in Saint-Boniface, Manitoba.)

Currently, many of the city's radio stations simulcast stations from Sudbury for at least part of their broadcast day.

Frequency	Call sign	Branding	Format	Owner	Notes
AM 1710	CHIM	Canada's Good News Network	Christian music		
FM 92.1	CJQQ-FM	Q92	active rock	Rogers Media	
FM 93.1	CHMT-FM	Country 93.1	country music	Vista Broadcast Group	
FM 96.1	CBCJ-FM	CBC Radio One	news/talk	Canadian Broadcasting Corporation	
FM 97.1	CBON-FM-25	Ici Radio-Canada Première	news/talk	Canadian Broadcasting Corporation	French
FM 99.3	CKGB-FM	Kiss 99.3	hot adult contemporary	Rogers Media	
FM 102.3	CHTI-FM		tourist information, jazz		Previously used by CHIM-FM on 102.3 and CHTI-FM originally signed on 101.5 FM in the early 2000s.
FM 104.1	CHYK-FM	Le Loup 104.1	hot adult contemporary	Le5 Communications	French
FM 105.5	CJTK-FM-5	KFM	Christian radio	Harvest Ministries Sudbury	Rebroadcaster of CJTK-FM Sudbury.
FM 106.7	CJWT-FM	Wawatay	First Nations community radio	Wawatay Native Communications Society	

=== Defunct radio stations ===
- CKTT-FM 94.3 (a tourist information station that was launched by 1311831 Ontario Limited in the early 2000s; the last license renewal was in 2007 to expire on August 31, 2014 and it is unknown when the station left the air)

== TV ==
Timmins is home to one television station which is locally licensed, CITO-TV. However, that station effectively acts as a satellite of Sudbury's CICI-TV as part of the CTV Northern Ontario system — the station's only direct local production is news reportage which airs as part of regional newscasts produced at the Sudbury station. The city formerly also had its own CBC Television affiliate, CFCL-TV. However, that station was acquired directly by the CBC in 2002, and became a straight analogue rebroadcaster of CBLT-DT from Toronto; the repeater would close down on July 31, 2012, due to budget cuts.

Timmins is not designated as a mandatory market for digital television conversion.

OTA channel	OTA virtual channel (PSIP)	EastLink Cable	Call sign	Network	Notes
3 (VHF)	–	4	CITO-TV	CTV	De facto rebroadcaster of CICI-TV (Sudbury)
11 (VHF)	–	6	CHCH-TV-7	Independent	Rebroadcaster of CHCH-DT (Hamilton)
13 (VHF)	13.1	5	CIII-DT-13	Global	Rebroadcaster of CIII-DT (Toronto)
Broadcasting Notice of Consultation CRTC 2018-379–	–	10	–	EastLink TV	Community channel for EastLink Cable subscribers; formerly Persona News 3

=== Cable ===
The cable television provider in the city is EastLink (formerly Persona Cable). The city's community channel is branded as EastLink TV. EastLink also produces a separate channel for real estate and advertising listings, branded as ClaimPost Realty.

Timmins is one of the few cities in Ontario whose cable provider carries an affiliate of the Quebec television network V (in this case, Montreal flagship CFJP-DT), which has only voluntary carriage rights outside of Quebec. In addition, Eastlink also carries Gatineau TVA affiliate CHOT-DT, instead of Montreal's CFTM-DT, which most cable systems outside of Quebec and Ottawa Valley carry; due to the region's large Franco-Ontarian community, Northern Cable, EastLink's predecessor in much of Northeastern Ontario, already carried CHOT long before TVA carriage became mandatory nationwide.

== Print ==
- L'Express de Timmins
- Les Nouvelles
- Timmins Daily Press, owned by Osprey Media (Sun Media/Quebecor)
- The Timmins Times

=== Defunct ===
- Porcupine Advance (March 28, 1912 – 1950)
