= CKGN =

CKGN may refer to:

- CKGN-FM, a radio station (89.7 FM) licensed to Kapuskasing, Ontario, Canada since 1993
- CIII-TV, a Toronto television station (channel 6) licensed to Paris, Ontario, Canada, which held the call sign CKGN-TV from 1974 to 1984
- CKNY-TV, a television station (channel 10) licensed to North Bay, Ontario, Canada, which held the call sign CKGN-TV from 1955 to 1960
