= CHNB =

CHNB may refer to:

- CHNB-DT - a Global station in Saint John, New Brunswick
- CHNB-TV - a defunct CBC station in North Bay, Ontario
- Chondroitin B lyase, an enzyme
