= CKGN-TV =

CKGN-TV may refer to:

- CKNY-TV, a television station (channel 10) licensed to North, Bay, Ontario, Canada, which held the call sign CKGN-TV from 1955 to 1960
- CIII-DT, a television station (channel 6) licensed to Paris, Ontario, Canada, which held the call sign CKGN-TV from 1974 to 1984
