= CHBX-TV =

Television station in Sault Ste. Marie, Ontario

- Sault Ste. Marie, Ontario; Canada
- Channels: Analog: 2 (VHF); Digital: allocated 13 (VHF)
- Branding: CTV Northern Ontario (general); CTV News Northern Ontario (newscasts)

Programming
- Network: CTV Northern Ontario
- Affiliations: CTV

Ownership
- Owner: Bell Media Inc.

History
- First air date: November 5, 1977
- Former call signs: CKCY-TV (1977–1985)

Technical information
- Licensing authority: CRTC
- ERP: 100 kW
- HAAT: 182.9 m (600 ft)
- Transmitter coordinates: 46°35′42″N 84°21′3″W

Links
- Website: CTV Northern Ontario

CHBX-TV (analog channel 2) is a television station in Sault Ste. Marie, Ontario, Canada, owned and operated by the CTV Television Network, a division of Bell Media. The station's studios and transmitter facilities are located on 6 Line East (just east of Peoples Road) in Sault Ste. Marie.

CHBX-TV is part of the CTV Northern Ontario sub-system. It essentially operates as a de facto semi-satellite of CICI-TV in Sudbury, running the same programming as that station at all times (except for certain commercials and regional news inserts during its newscasts).

The station's signal also reaches the eastern portion of the Upper Peninsula of Michigan, and can be seen over-the-air as far south as Gaylord, Michigan. It is carried on Charter Spectrum in St. Ignace on Channel 2; however, it is not seen on Spectrum in Sault Ste. Marie, Michigan.

== History ==
The station began broadcasting on November 5, 1977, as CKCY-TV. It was owned by Huron Broadcasting along with CBC affiliate CJIC-TV, and was a sister station of an AM radio outlet with the same call letters. Prior to the sign-on of CKCY, CTV programming was available in Sault Ste. Marie on cable from Sudbury's CKSO-TV (now CICI).

It adopted the current CHBX call sign in 1985, when the radio station was sold to Mid-Canada Radio. In 1990, Huron sold CHBX and its CBC-affiliated twinstick CJIC-TV to Baton Broadcasting, which merged them into the MCTV system. Ironically, MCTV flagship CICI had been available on cable in Sault Ste. Marie for part of the 1980s; the two stations aired radically different programming at the time.

Baton became the sole corporate owner of CTV in 1997, and sold CJIC to the CBC in 2002.

== Transmitters ==
CHBX also broadcasts on CHBX-TV-1 (channel 7) in Wawa; this repeater was among a long list of CTV rebroadcasters nationwide to have shut down on or before August 31, 2009, as part of a political dispute with Canadian authorities on paid fee-for-carriage requirements for cable television operators. A subsequent change in ownership assigned full control of CTVglobemedia to Bell Canada Enterprises; as of 2011, these transmitters remain in normal licensed broadcast operation.

On February 11, 2016, Bell Media applied for its regular license renewals, which included applications to delete a long list of transmitters, including CHBX-TV-1. Bell Media's rationale for deleting these analog repeaters is below:

"We are electing to delete these analog transmitters from the main licence with which they are associated. These analog transmitters generate no incremental revenue, attract little to no viewership given the growth of BDU or DTH subscriptions and are costly to maintain, repair or replace. In addition, none of the highlighted transmitters offer any programming that differs from the main channels. The Commission has determined that broadcasters may elect to shut down transmitters but will lose certain regulatory privileges (distribution on the basic service, the ability to request simultaneous substitution) as noted in Broadcasting Regulatory Policy CRTC 2015–24, Over-the-air transmission of television signals and local programming. We are fully aware of the loss of these regulatory privileges as a result of any transmitter shutdown."

At the same time, Bell Media applied to convert the licenses of CTV 2 Atlantic (formerly ASN) and CTV 2 Alberta (formerly ACCESS) from satellite-to-cable undertakings into television stations without transmitters (similar to cable-only network affiliates in the United States), and to reduce the level of educational content on CTV2 Alberta.
