= Mid-Canada Communications =

Former Canadian media company

Mid-Canada Communications (Canada) Corp.
- Type: Private (subsidiary of Northern Cable/CUC Broadcasting)
- Industry: Media
- Founded: 1980 (46 years ago)
- Defunct: 1990 (36 years ago) (MCTV branding dropped in 2005)
- Headquarters: Sudbury, Ontario
- Key people: George Lund
- Products: television, radio

Mid-Canada Communications (Canada) Corp. was a Canadian media company, which operated from 1980 to 1990. The company, a subsidiary of Northern Cable, had television and radio holdings in Northeastern Ontario.

== MCTV ==
Mid-Canada Television, or MCTV, was created in 1980 when Cambrian Broadcasting, which owned the CTV affiliates in Sudbury, North Bay and Timmins, merged with J. Conrad Lavigne's CBC affiliates in the same cities.

This twinstick structure was permitted by the Canadian Radio-television and Telecommunications Commission (CRTC) because both companies were on the brink of bankruptcy due to their aggressive competition for limited advertising dollars in small markets. Notably, the companies' holdings included two parallel microwave transmission systems, both of which were among the largest such systems in the world at the time, and which were technically redundant since one system can in fact carry multiple channels.

The deal represented the first time that the CRTC had ever approved direct ownership of a radio or television broadcast outlet by a cable distribution company, which is now commonplace in Canada but was explicitly forbidden by CRTC policy prior to the MCTV approval.

In its decision, however, the CRTC explicitly stated that the merger was approved as a temporary arrangement, only until the CBC could afford to directly acquire MCTV's CBC affiliates. That "temporary" deal, however, would last 22 years; even after MCTV was acquired by and folded into Baton Broadcasting in 1990, Baton still retained ownership of the CBC affiliates until the early 2000s. Mid-Canada Communications did offer ownership of its newly-redundant second microwave network to the CBC as an interim step toward the establishment of a CBC Television production facility in the region; the CBC, however, expressed interest in keeping the negotiations open but declined to immediately purchase the system.

In response to concentration of media ownership concerns, the merged company divested itself of its predecessor companies' radio holdings CKSO and CIGM-FM in Sudbury, although it retained ownership of a couple of smaller-market radio stations and would later reacquire other radio stations in the region (see Mid-Canada Radio below.)

The MCTV stations were:

- North Bay - CKNY (CTV), CHNB (CBC)
- Sudbury - CICI (CTV), CKNC (CBC)
- Timmins - CITO (CTV), CFCL (CBC)

All six stations were primarily referred to on air as MCTV rather than by their callsigns, and were distinguished from each other by use of their network affiliation (i.e. "MCTV-CTV" and "MCTV-CBC".) Less frequently, versions of its logo were sometimes seen which included both the call sign and the MCTV branding.

Due to CTV's status at the time as a cooperative of its affiliated stations, MCTV itself held a 2.1 per cent share in the network.

As well, MCTV owned CHRO in Pembroke, a CBC affiliate in a market with no other television stations. CHRO used the same logo and programming schedule as MCTV's other stations, but it used its own callsign, rather than MCTV, as its on-air identification.

== Mid-Canada Radio ==
In 1985, Mid-Canada Communications acquired six radio stations in Sudbury, Elliot Lake, Blind River and Espanola, which were aligned with the company's existing radio holdings in Kapuskasing, Hearst, Timmins and Pembroke into the Mid-Canada Radio group. The system expanded in the latter half of the 1980s, with further acquisitions in Sault Ste. Marie, Wawa, North Bay and another station in Kapuskasing bringing the group to 15 stations by 1990.

- Blind River - CJNR
- Elliot Lake - CKNR
- Espanola - CKNS
- Hearst - CFLH
- Kapuskasing - CFLK, CKAP
- North Bay - CHUR
- Pembroke - CHRO
- Sault Ste. Marie - CKCY, CJQM
- Sudbury - CFBR, CHNO, CJMX
- Timmins - CFCL
- Wawa - CJWA

The stations shared some news and sales resources, but were programmed independently of each other except for two shared overnight programs: one for the francophone stations (CFBR, CFLK, CFLH and CFCL), and one for the anglophone stations (all others).

== Acquisition ==
On July 26, 1990, Northern Cable began divesting itself of its media properties. Pelmorex purchased Mid-Canada Radio, and Baton Broadcasting acquired MCTV. Baton also purchased Sault Ste. Marie's Huron Broadcasting in 1990, and converted CHBX and CJIC to the MCTV branding as well.

Under Baton's ownership, the stations retained the MCTV branding, and became part of the Baton Broadcast System. The CBC stations were eventually sold outright to CBC in 2002, while the CTV stations dropped their longtime MCTV branding and were rebranded as CTV Northern Ontario with its newscasts rebranding from MCTV News to CTV News in October 2005.

== Former MCTV logos ==
Former Mid-Canada Television logos that were used in the 1980s and carried on with the MCTV branding until 2005.

The original logo for Mid-Canada Communications Corp. circa. 1980 until 1984

MCTV logo used from 1984-1994. Mid-Canada created the stylish red maple leaf shaped logo with the blue capitalized MCTV letters beneath the logo in 1984.

MCTV's BBS logo, used from 1994-1997. Under the ownership of Baton Broadcasting, the MCTV branding still remained. The previous MCTV logo was dropped in 1994 when all of the other Baton-owned stations adopted a similar logo, the only difference being the call letters. Unlike other Baton-owned stations, the MCTV stations didn't use their call signs on their logos. The logo featured multicoloured rings around the word BBS.

MCTV logo under CTV ownership from late 1990s to 2005.

== Notes ==
Mid-Canada's final license renewal for its television stations in northern Ontario was from September 1, 1989 to August 31, 1994.

On January 3, 1990, the CRTC approved a corporate reorganization of a group of radio stations in northern Ontario, among them CHNO, CFBR and CJMX-FM into a new company under the name “Ottawa Valley Broadcasting Company Limited.” The other stations being CKNS Espanola, CKNR Elliot Lake, CFCL Timmins, CFLH Hearst, CFLK Kapuskasing, CJNR Blind River and CKAP Kapuskasing, and by CKCY 920 Limited (CKCY and CJQM-FM Sault Ste. Marie and CJWA Wawa).
