= CTV Northern Ontario =

System of four television stations in Northern Ontario, Canada

- Type: Broadcast television system
- Country: Canada
- First air date: October 25, 1953 (71 years ago)
- TV stations: CICI-TV; CKNY-DT; CHBX-TV; CITO-TV
- Broadcast area: Most communities in Northeastern Ontario, also available nationally via satellite
- Owner: BCE Inc.
- Parent: Bell Media
- Former names: MCTV (1980–2005)
- Affiliation(s): CTV Television Network
- Official website: CTV Northern Ontario

CTV Northern Ontario, formerly known as MCTV, is a system of four television stations in Northern Ontario, Canada, owned and operated by the CTV Television Network, a division of Bell Media.

These stations are:

- CICI-TV - Greater Sudbury (flagship station)
- CKNY-DT - North Bay
- CHBX-TV - Sault Ste. Marie
- CITO-TV - Timmins

Since 2005, all four stations refer to themselves on-air as simply CTV instead of their callsigns; however, they remain legally licensed as separate stations, and continue to have common local programming. Station information and history is discussed on each station's own page.

== History ==
=== Background ===
Each of the four cities served by the CTV Northern Ontario system saw the launch of a locally owned television station in the 1950s: Sudbury's CKSO-TV was launched by the owners of the Sudbury Star in 1953, Sault Ste. Marie's CJIC-TV was launched by Hyland Broadcasting in 1955, North Bay's CKGN-TV was launched by Gerry Alger and Gerry Stanton in 1955, and Timmins's CFCL-TV was launched by J. Conrad Lavigne in 1956. All four stations were CBC Television affiliates at the time, as CTV did not exist until 1961.

Each station continued to operate separately until 1970 when applications were filed with Canadian Radio-television and Telecommunications Commission to launch a second television station in Sudbury; the application process ultimately resulted in a major realignment in Sudbury, North Bay and Timmins. Cambrian Broadcasting, the Sudbury station's owners at this time, acquired the North Bay station and launched a repeater of CKSO in Timmins, serving as the new CTV affiliate in all three cities, while Lavigne launched new stations CKNC-TV in Sudbury and CHNB-TV in North Bay, and retained the CBC affiliation. Although Hyland Broadcasting was one of the original applicants for a new Sudbury station, CJIC remained unaffected by the final outcome at the time.

Through the 1970s, however, the North Bay and Timmins markets proved too small to support competition between multiple stations; although the Sudbury stations were nominally profitable on their own, the losses in North Bay and Timmins left both companies nearly bankrupt by 1980.

=== MCTV ===
(See Mid-Canada Communications main article)

As a result of the stations' precarious financial situation, the CRTC permitted Northern Cable, the region's primary cable television provider, to purchase both companies. Northern Cable formed Mid-Canada Communications as a holding company for the six stations, operating them under a twinstick model. The CRTC explicitly stated that it intended this to be only a temporary arrangement, to end as soon as the CBC could afford to directly acquire MCTV's CBC affiliates. At this time, CKSO-TV adopted the new callsign CICI, and its repeater in Timmins became a new standalone station, CITO-TV.

All six stations were referred to on air as Mid-Canada Television, or MCTV for short; the station pairs were distinguished from each other by use of their network affiliation (i.e., "MCTV-CTV" and "MCTV-CBC"). As well, MCTV owned CHRO-TV in Pembroke, a market with no other television stations. CHRO used the same logo and programming schedule as MCTV's other stations, but it always used its own callsign, rather than MCTV, as its on-air identification.

Due to CTV's status at the time as a cooperative of its affiliated stations, MCTV itself held a 2.1 per cent share in the network.

=== Hyland/Huron Broadcasting ===
Through the 1970s and 1980s, the Sault Ste. Marie stations remained a separate operation and were not part of Mid-Canada Communications. In 1976, Hyland Broadcasting merged with another local company to form Huron Broadcasting, and in 1978 the company launched CKCY-TV as the city's CTV affiliate under the same twinstick model.

Huron Broadcasting did, however, sell most of its radio stations in Sault Ste. Marie and other Northern Ontario communities to Mid-Canada Communications in 1988.

=== Baton Broadcasting ===
Baton Broadcasting acquired both Mid-Canada and Huron in 1990, and the Huron stations were converted to the MCTV branding at this time. As well, Baton reaffiliated CHRO with CTV. Baton eventually became the sole corporate proprietor of CTV, making the MCTV stations fully owned and operated stations of the network, and sold CHRO to CHUM Limited in 1998; at the time CHUM acquired CHRO, it disaffiliated from CTV and became an independent station for a short time before joining the NewNet system (now CTV 2).

Baton retained the CBC twinsticks until 2002, when it sold them to the Canadian Broadcasting Corporation. Politicians in the area, most notably Sault Ste. Marie MP Carmen Provenzano, expressed the hope that the sale would result in the CBC launching new local newscasts, but when the deal was finalized in early 2003, the CBC simply converted them to full retransmitters of CBLT, Toronto's CBC owned-and-operated station, with all four stations surrendering their old call letters. Later in 2003, MCTV's master control operations were transferred to the CTV facilities in Toronto.

== News operations ==
In November 2001, CTV merged the news production facilities of the MCTV stations into a single regional newscast, with only short inserts for each city's local coverage. The regional newscast is produced at CICI. This created extensive controversy, with many public interest groups across Canada raising concerns about the disappearance of local news coverage in small markets. Some groups lobbied for the CBC to produce new local newscasts in the cities on MCTV's CBC stations in cooperation with CTV, but this model was not pursued.

Organizations in Sault Ste. Marie, North Bay and Timmins began to call for a boycott of MCTV news, and local companies began offering web-based sources of local news, weather, and sports information, most notably the Village Media network of internet properties. A local video news website called LTVnews.com was launched in Sault Ste. Marie by former CHBX news director Craig Huckerby in 2003; it launched a daily news program on the city's cable community channel in 2005, before being acquired by Village Media.

In late 2003 and early 2004, following some resident complaints that MCTV's coverage of the city's municipal election had been inadequate, Sault Ste. Marie City Council debated a motion requesting that the CRTC direct MCTV to sell a station in the city to a local buyer who would relaunch a fully local newscast, although the motion was criticized in part because it rested on the mistaken belief that MCTV still had ownership and control of the CBC stations.

In October 2005, MCTV News was renamed as CTV News, in line with all other CTV owned-and-operated stations. CTV News uses WSI's TrueView Max Weather Technology to broadcast weather reports during its newscasts.
