= Planet Tolex =

- Genre: Children's science fiction
- Created by: Leo Velleman; Dora Velleman
- Country of origin: Canada
- Original language: English
- No. of seasons: 1

Production
- Producers: Joanne Hughes; Peggy Nairn
- Production location: Montreal
- Running time: 30 minutes

Original release
- Network: CBC Television
- Release: 20 October 1953 – 30 April 1954

Planet Tolex is a Canadian children's science fiction television series that aired on CBC Television from 1953 to 1954.

== Premise ==
The fictional Planet Tolex of the series title was located in the Solar System, orbiting so that it was always opposite to the Earth, always causing its sightline with Tolex to be blocked by the Sun. The series' puppet-based characters were led by Bricol and Lexo and their fellow Tolex residents. Leo and Dora Velleman were the series creators and puppeteers.

== Scheduling ==
This Montreal-produced half-hour series was broadcast on Tuesdays at 5:00 p.m. (Eastern) from 20 October 1953 to 27 April 1954. It was also aired on CBLT Toronto on the following Fridays at 5:00 p.m., except during 19 March to 9 April 1954 when it was rescheduled to 5:30 p.m. while school broadcasts were aired at 5:00 p.m.
