= Baton Broadcast System =

Canadian television system

- Type: Defunct broadcast television system
- Country: Canada
- Availability: Semi-national; urban areas of Ontario and Saskatchewan
- Headquarters: Regina, Saskatchewan, Canada; Toronto, Ontario, Canada
- Owner: Baton Broadcasting
- Launch date: October 1994; 31 years ago (merger of STN and ONT)
- Dissolved: January 1998; 27 years ago (merged into CTV)
- Affiliation: CTV Television Network

The Baton Broadcast System (/ˈbeɪtɒn/ BAY-ton), also known as BBS, was a Canadian system of television stations located in Ontario and Saskatchewan, owned by Baton Broadcasting. BBS was the successor to two provincial systems also owned by Baton, the Saskatchewan Television Network (STN) and Ontario Network Television (ONT).

During the 1990s, BBS and its predecessors served as a complementary programming service to the CTV Television Network, to which most (but not all) of the system's stations were already affiliated. Shortly after Baton's acquisition of CTV in 1997 and the contemporaneous sale of Baton's independent stations (later re-acquired by Bell and currently part of the parallel CTV 2 system), the BBS brand was eliminated, and the system's operations were merged into the CTV network.

== History ==
=== Background ===
During its years as a cooperative, CTV did not broadcast a complete primetime schedule. During the late 1980s and early 1990s, it broadcast 60 hours of common programming each week, with a few gaps in primetime for affiliates to schedule locally; in some cases stations could even pick when to air network programs.

During this same period, CTV's profits began to decline, and by the early 1990s the network was posting losses, largely due to increased competition from the CanWest Global System and other independent stations. Many affiliate groups, such as Baton and WIC – the latter already owning several independent stations – decided they would prefer to buy and air more of their own programming. Accordingly, as part of CTV's 1993 restructuring, network programming was reduced to 42.5 hours (and soon after to 40), including 12 hours in primetime. From this point on (until 1998), CTV network programming only took up about half of affiliates' primetime schedules.

=== Ontario Network Television: 1991-1994 ===
Ontario Network Television
- Type: Defunct broadcast television system
- Country: Canada
- Availability: Semi-national; urban areas of Ontario
- Owner: Baton Broadcasting
- Launch date: September 1991; 34 years ago
- Dissolved: October 1994; 31 years ago (merged into BBS)
- Affiliation: CTV Television Network

ONT was initiated in 1991, consisting of eight CTV affiliates – seven owned by Baton (CFTO-TV, CJOH-TV, CHRO-TV, and the MCTV stations) and Electrohome's CKCO-TV. Initially providing 10.5 hours of common programming each week, this was soon expanded to 35 hours.

While ONT was a secondary affiliation and not a separate network from CTV, some claimed it was a first step towards the Baton stations becoming a separate network. Indeed, Baton began to bid against CTV for the rights to new U.S. series. However, Baton's president at the time, Douglas Bassett, contended it was merely a "marketing vehicle" to compete with CanWest Global's CIII-TV, a single station which served almost all of Ontario.

In 1993, Baton acquired two independent stations: CFPL-TV and CKNX-TV, and launched a third: CHWI-TV. These stations replaced CKCO within ONT. In response, CKCO and WIC's CHCH-TV Hamilton announced a joint initiative of their own, known as "Market One Television"; however, this partnership was short-lived.

In addition to the CTV affiliates and independent stations, some ONT (and later BBS) programming may have aired on Baton's CBC affiliates, part of twinstick operations in northern Ontario. In the rest of Canada, Baton sublicensed its programming to individual stations, usually CTV affiliates. Even the ONT brand was seen from time to time in the rest of Canada, mainly through Baton-produced Toronto Blue Jays games.

=== The BBS years: 1994-1997 ===
CFTO BBS logo.

In October 1994, Baton hired the management consulting firm McKinsey & Company to help evaluate how to proceed with its national expansion plans. McKinsey's report recommended, first and foremost, that Baton attempt to take control of the CTV trademark, which it saw as one of the most valuable brands in Canada, through the acquisition of as many other CTV affiliates (and their corresponding shares in the network) as possible. However, the report also recommended that Baton create a new national brand as a backup, to help reduce the damage should Baton's gambit fail and CTV pass into a competitor's hands.

This new brand turned out to be BBS, with a logo adapted from CFTO's multicoloured-iris logo. Baton's local stations dropped their individual logos and adopted the new BBS symbol, with the station call letters positioned beneath. In contrast, ONT was simply a secondary brand and had not replaced local station logos. Despite the value Baton placed in the CTV brand, BBS became more a more prominent part of these stations' branding than CTV itself.

BBS replaced ONT in fall 1994, with the addition of Baton's six stations in Saskatchewan – CTV affiliates CKCK-TV in Regina, CFQC-TV in Saskatoon, CICC-TV in Yorkton, and CIPA-TV in Prince Albert, and CBC affiliates CKOS-TV in Yorkton and CKBI-TV in Prince Albert. They had been jointly branded as the "Saskatchewan Television Network" since 1987.

Programming included U.S. series such as Law & Order, Home Improvement, Melrose Place, and Ellen, the soap opera Family Passions, a Saturday morning block of mainly Disney cartoons branded as BBS Master Control (including Timon & Pumbaa and programming from Disney's One Saturday Morning), news and talk programming such as Sunday Edition and The Dini Petty Show, and sports programming such as Blue Jays games, which were again syndicated to other Canadian stations.

As a result of the Baton-Electrohome alliance, CKCO (now jointly owned by both companies) joined the system in 1996. Baton and Electrohome also jointly acquired CFCN-TV in Calgary around the same time; both CFCN and Electrohome-owned CFRN-TV in Edmonton aired much of the BBS lineup, but did not actively use the BBS brand.

=== Acquisition of CTV ===
In 1997, Baton bought controlling interest in CTV, and became the sole corporate owner of the network later that year after the remaining station owners sold their shares. Baton continued to consider the long-standing CTV brand much preferable to its lesser-known BBS moniker, and had not bothered to introduce the latter brand to its new acquisitions.

Almost immediately after its purchase of CTV was complete, Baton introduced new station logos on all of its CTV-affiliated stations that incorporated the network brand, and began using the CTV logo in all programming and promotions where the BBS logo was previously used, even though these programs remained separate from the CTV network service proper. The BBS name was completely dropped no later than the end of January 1998, and Baton itself changed its corporate name to CTV Inc. later that year.

Nevertheless, BBS lived on in a very limited sense until 2001, since CTV maintained a separate stream of programming not part of the CTV network service – though as noted above, from this point on such shows were branded as CTV programs on the network's O&Os. This structure was necessary because the "old" CTV's affiliation agreements, which generally limited network service to 40 hours a week, remained in force. For instance, CHAN-TV (then known as BCTV) was Vancouver's CTV affiliate but carried no more than 40 hours of CTV programming (for instance, in its final seasons as a CTV affiliate, it did not broadcast Canada AM at all, airing local news instead, although sister station CHEK-TV did air CanAM) while CTV-owned independent station CIVT-TV carried the remainder. As its establishment came shortly before Baton adopted the CTV name for its stations, CIVT did not use the BBS name, instead branding as Vancouver Television (VTV).

Other affiliates such as CKY-TV in Winnipeg, NTV in St. John's, Newfoundland and Labrador, and to a lesser extent CFCF-TV in Montreal, usually acquired additional programming, as they had from BBS. However, these programs were not added to the base 40-hour network schedule (which was part of a traditional network arrangement whereby the network retained most of the ad inventory and affiliates were compensated with airtime payments) – instead, stations had to pay the network for these additional programs, although they would sell all ads locally (which made the practice more akin to all-cash syndication rather than the more contemporary U.S. practice of reverse compensation). Series would sometimes switch back and forth between network and non-network status, and in limited cases alternate programming was supplied to affiliates in the event that specific episodes of a non-network program (e.g., Who Wants to Be a Millionaire) were scheduled for a timeslot that had been previously allocated as network time.

On September 1, 2001, CIVT-TV became the Vancouver CTV owned-and-operated station, displacing BCTV and CHEK; around the same time, CTV acquired CKY and CFCF, giving the network's O&O stations group coverage of virtually all major Canadian markets. As a result, CTV elected not to renew its national network licence with the CRTC, and the largely artificial distinction between network and non-network programming was eliminated at this point. CTV would later re-apply for a separate regional licence used specifically to provide programming to affiliates owned by third parties. In this sense, CTV as it presently operates could be seen as an enlarged BBS by another name, rather than the direct successor to the "original" CTV; however, for most viewers, this is a technicality of little practical significance.

Baton's independents and newly disaffiliated CHRO-TV were sold to CHUM Limited, becoming NewNet stations; however CTVglobemedia (now Bell Media), Baton's successor as a corporate entity, reacquired them as part of its purchase of CHUM Limited in 2007. These stations are now operated by Bell Media under the CTV 2 banner.

Baton's CBC affiliates were later sold to the public broadcaster, and became repeaters of other CBC owned-and-operated stations. CTVgm would later acquire another CBC affiliate, CKX-TV in Brandon, Manitoba, as part of the CHUM purchase, which closed down in late 2009 after a variety of efforts to sell the station failed. Bell Media then acquired two additional two CBC affiliates in interior British Columbia (CJDC-TV Dawson Creek and CFTK-TV Terrace) as part of its 2013 purchase of Astral Media, eventually converting both to CTV 2 stations in 2016.

== List of BBS stations ==
Affiliations listed are those in effect during their participation in BBS.

=== Ontario ===
- Kitchener: CKCO-TV (CTV)
- London: CFPL-TV (Independent)
- North Bay: CKNY-TV (CTV), CHNB-TV (CBC)
- Ottawa: CJOH-TV (CTV)
- Pembroke: CHRO-TV (CTV)
- Sault Ste. Marie: CHBX-TV (CTV), CJIC-TV (CBC)
- Sudbury: CICI-TV (CTV), CKNC-TV (CBC)
- Timmins: CITO-TV (CTV), CFCL-TV (CBC)
- Toronto: CFTO-TV (CTV)
- Wheatley: CHWI-TV (Independent)
- Wingham: CKNX-TV (Independent)

=== Saskatchewan ===
- Prince Albert: CIPA-TV (CTV), CKBI-TV (CBC)
- Regina: CKCK-TV (CTV)
- Saskatoon: CFQC-TV (CTV)
- Yorkton: CICC-TV (CTV), CKOS-TV (CBC)
