= CICI-TV =

Television station in Sudbury

- Sudbury, Ontario; Canada
- Channels: Analog: 5 (VHF); Digital: allocated 8 (VHF)
- Branding: CTV Northern Ontario (general); CTV News Northern Ontario (newscasts)

Programming
- Affiliations: CTV

Ownership
- Owner: Bell Media Inc.
- Sister stations: CICS-FM

History
- First air date: October 25, 1953
- Former call signs: CKSO-TV (1953–1980)
- Former affiliations: CBC (1953–1971)

Technical information
- Licensing authority: CRTC
- ERP: 100 kW
- HAAT: 324.2 m (1,064 ft)
- Transmitter coordinates: 46°30′2″N 81°1′12″W

Links
- Website: CTV Northern Ontario

CICI-TV (analog channel 5) is a television station in Sudbury, Ontario, Canada, owned and operated by the CTV Television Network, a division of Bell Media. The station maintains studios on Frood Road (near Lasalle Boulevard) in Sudbury; its transmitter is located near Huron Street.

CICI-TV is the flagship station of the network's CTV Northern Ontario sub-system. CICI produces all of the CTV Northern Ontario stations' local programming, except for some local news inserts in the system's newscasts.

== History ==
The station was launched on October 25, 1953, by Sudbury businessmen George Miller, Jim Cooper and Bill Plaunt. It was the first privately owned television station to launch in Canada, and only the fourth television station overall after CBC Television's owned-and-operated stations CBLT in Toronto, CBMT in Montreal and CBOT in Ottawa. Its original call sign was CKSO-TV. The station was a CBC affiliate, receiving programs by kinescope until a microwave relay system linked the station to Toronto in 1956. The station originally broadcast only from 7 to 11 p.m., but by the end of its first year in operation it was on the air from 3:30 p.m. to midnight.

The station was owned by the Sudbury Star along with CKSO radio (AM 790, now CJRQ at FM 92.7). The newspaper was sold to Thomson Newspapers in 1955, but the paper's former local owners retained the radio and television stations under the corporate name CKSO Ltd. The company name was changed to Cambrian Broadcasting by 1965.

=== Reaffiliation with CTV ===
In 1970, four separate companies simultaneously applied for new stations in Sudbury: J. Conrad Lavigne, who owned the existing CBC affiliate CFCL-TV in Timmins, and Hyland Broadcasting, which owned the existing CBC affiliate CJIC-TV in Sault Ste. Marie, each applied for a rebroadcast transmitter in Sudbury to transmit their existing programming, predicated on the assumption that CKSO would then switch its affiliation to CTV; the Canadian Broadcasting Corporation itself applied for its own owned-and-operated station in the city, also predicated on the same assumption; and a fourth company, North Star Broadcasting, applied to launch a new CTV affiliate.

The Canadian Radio-television and Telecommunications Commission (CRTC) rejected all four of the original applications on the grounds that as Sudbury was the only city in the region large enough to support two competing television stations, all of the original applications would have effectively shut down any path for CTV service to ever be extended to Timmins or North Bay; even the mere addition of rebroadcasters of Sudbury's new CTV station would itself destroy the viability of the existing CBC stations in the smaller cities unless they were also paired up to a sister station in Sudbury. It accordingly directed Cambrian and Lavigne, as the incumbent broadcasters, to collaborate on a new plan that would treat Sudbury, North Bay and Timmins as a single market, and extend CTV service to all three cities. Although North Bay's CFCH-TV was owned by another company at this time, its owners were trying to sell the station and thus were not considered to be relevant to the plan. Accordingly, the two companies then resubmitted a revised application under which Lavigne would launch stations in Sudbury and North Bay and become the CBC affiliate in all three cities, while Cambrian would purchase CFCH, launch a rebroadcaster of CKSO in Timmins, and switch its affiliation to CTV in all three cities.

CKSO thus disaffiliated from the CBC to join CTV in 1971. Lavigne's new CBC affiliate, CKNC, went to air in Sudbury the day of CKSO's affiliation switch.

CKSO was Sudbury's only television station until 1971, when CKNC signed on. A building at 699 Frood Road was built and later became the permanent home for CKSO and CKNC (now defunct) where the station remains to this day.

=== Merger ===
The financial pressures of competing in small markets, however, left both companies losing money and very nearly bankrupt by 1980. As a result, the CRTC approved a full merger into the MCTV twinstick. As part of the deal, Cambrian Broadcasting spun CKSO radio off to new owners, and since the stations no longer had common ownership the television station adopted the new call sign CICI. At this time, the Timmins repeater was converted into a new standalone station, CITO-TV.

In 1981, an Ontario provincial court case against the station, for allegedly failing to satisfy its Canadian content requirements in the 1979–80 season, briefly had the effect of nullifying the entire policy; the judge ruled that because the federal Broadcast Act defined a station as the holder of a licence issued under the Radio Act of 1967, but the Canadian content regulations were set down in a later revision of the Broadcast Act, a station was not bound by the regulation as it wasn't present in the 1967 edition. The ruling was subsequently overturned on appeal.

In 1990, the stations were acquired by Baton Broadcasting. Baton bought full control of CTV in 1997, making CICI a fully owned-and-operated station of the network. CKNC was sold to the CBC in 2002, ceasing operations and becoming a full-time rebroadcaster of CBLT in Toronto.

== Famous people ==
Former CKSO employee Judy Jacobson was the first woman in Canadian broadcasting history to work on air as a television weather reporter. She later became a federal Member of Parliament for Sudbury's Nickel Belt riding.

Other past employees of the station include journalists Francis D'Souza, Sarika Sehgal and Susan Hay, all later associated with major market stations in Toronto, as well as sportscasters and former hockey players Cummy Burton and Frank Salive.

Brendan Connor rejoined the station in 2011 as news anchor, after spending many years as a sportscaster and anchor for national and international networks including TSN, CBC Newsworld and Al Jazeera English. He is the son of Michael Connor, a longtime news anchor from the station's days as CKSO. Michael Connor died in December 2008, at age 82.

In the 1960s and 1970s, Inco sponsored a local variety show, Inco Presents, on the station. The program included comedic sketches performed by the duo of Gil Mayer and Norm McGilvary, in which Mayer, a sales manager with the station, performed the character of miner "Marcel Mucker". Marc Mayer, now the director of the National Gallery of Canada, is the son of Gil Mayer.

Alan Nesbitt, a journalist who worked for the station in the 1960s before moving on to major market stations in the United States, wrote about his time with the station in a chapter of his 2020 memoir Stepping Out Into Traffic.

== Transmitters ==
CICI also broadcast on CICI-TV-1 channel 3 in Elliot Lake and CKNY-TV-11 channel 11 in Huntsville. The rebroadcaster in Huntsville was originally a CKCO-TV repeater (CKCO-TV-4), but switched to CKNY-TV as its source, and then to CICI-TV, retaining the CKNY-TV-11 call sign. This repeater initially aired a very small amount of local programming distinct from its parent station, but ultimately this was phased out, though it still aired a small amount of local commercials specifically for the Huntsville area.

Both transmitters were among a long list of CTV rebroadcasters nationwide to have shut down on or before August 31, 2009, as part of a political dispute with Canadian authorities on paid fee-for-carriage requirements for cable television operators. A subsequent change in ownership assigned full control of CTVglobemedia to Bell Canada; as of 2011, these transmitters remain in normal licensed broadcast operation.

On February 11, 2016, Bell Media applied for its regular licence renewals, which included applications to delete a long list of transmitters, including CICI-TV-1. Bell Media's rationale for deleting these analog repeaters is below:

We are electing to delete these analog transmitters from the main licence with which they are associated. These analog transmitters generate no incremental revenue, attract little to no viewership given the growth of BDU or DTH subscriptions and are costly to maintain, repair or replace. In addition, none of the highlighted transmitters offer any programming that differs from the main channels. The Commission has determined that broadcasters may elect to shut down transmitters but will lose certain regulatory privileges (distribution on the basic service, the ability to request simultaneous substitution) as noted in Broadcasting Regulatory Policy CRTC 2015–24, Over-the-air transmission of television signals and local programming. We are fully aware of the loss of these regulatory privileges as a result of any transmitter shutdown.

On July 30, 2019, Bell Media was granted permission to close down CKNY-TV-11 Huntsville as part of Broadcasting Decision CRTC 2019-268. This transmitter was shut down by October 9, 2020.

== Special programming ==
Each December, the station airs a locally produced program called the CTV Lions Children's Christmas Telethon.
