= CKGN-FM =

Radio station in Kapuskasing and Smooth Rock Falls, Ontario

- Kapuskasing, Ontario; Canada
- Broadcast area: Kapuskasing
- Frequency: 89.7 MHz
- Branding: CKGN

Programming
- Format: community radio

Ownership
- Owner: Radio Communautaire KapNord

Technical information
- Class: A
- ERP: 3.0 kWs
- HAAT: 55 metres (180 ft)
- Repeaters: CKGN-FM-1 94.7 Smooth Rock Falls: 250 watts ERP, 50.3 metres HAAT

Links
- Website: CKGN website

CKGN-FM is a Canadian radio station, broadcasting at 89.7 FM in Kapuskasing, Ontario and 94.7 FM in Smooth Rock Falls. Owned and operated by Radio communautaire KapNord cooperative, it is a non-profit community radio station for the region's franco-ontarian community.

The station is a member of the Alliance des radios communautaires du Canada.

== History ==
The station originally dates back to 1990 when Radio Communautaire Kapnord Inc. received an approval from the Canadian Radio-television and Telecommunications Commission (CRTC) on September 28, 1990 to operate a low-power short-term French language community events radio station at Kapuskasing on the frequency of 91.5 MHz with 33 watts. Two more licences were granted before the station officially signed on in 1993.

On January 26, 1993, Kapnord received CRTC approval to operate a new French language community radio station on the frequency of 89.7 MHz with an effective radiated power of 3,000 watts. The station officially signed on the air on October 20 later that same year with the CKGN-FM callsign.

== Rebroadcasters ==
In 2000, the station was authorized to add a transmitter at Smooth Rock Falls to operate on the frequency 94.7 FM. The transmitter signed on as CKGN-FM-1 in 2002.

== Notes ==
=== History of the CKGN call letters ===
CKGN is a former callsign from a television station in North Bay, Ontario from 1955 to 1962, known today as CKNY-DT and CKGN was again used for a television station (Global Television) in Toronto, Ontario from 1974 to 1984. The call letters remained unused until the launch of CKGN-FM in the early 1990s.
