= CITO-TV =

Television station in Timmins

- Timmins, Ontario; Canada
- Channels: Analog: 3 (VHF)
- Branding: CTV Northern Ontario (general); CTV News Northern Ontario (newscasts)

Programming
- Network: CTV Northern Ontario
- Affiliations: CTV

Ownership
- Owner: Bell Media Inc.

History
- First air date: April 1, 1971
- Former call signs: CKSO-TV-2 (1971–1980)
- Call sign meaning: CI Timmins, Ontario

Technical information
- Licensing authority: CRTC
- ERP: 100 kW
- HAAT: 147.6 m (484 ft)
- Transmitter coordinates: 48°32′49″N 80°57′9″W
- Translator(s): see § Transmitters

Links
- Website: CTV Northern Ontario

CITO-TV (analog channel 3) is a television station in Timmins, Ontario, Canada, owned and operated by the CTV Television Network, a division of Bell Media. The station's studios are located on Pine Street North (near Hendry Avenue) in Timmins, and its transmitter is near Highway 101 (just west of Connaught Road). It also operates a rebroadcaster in Kapuskasing (channel 10).

CITO-TV is part of the CTV Northern Ontario sub-system. It essentially operates as a de facto semi-satellite of CICI-TV in Sudbury, running the same programming as that station at all times (except for certain commercials and regional news inserts during its newscasts).

== History ==
CITO was established April 1, 1971, as CKSO-TV-2, originally rebroadcasting CKSO in Sudbury. Unlike CKSO and CKNY in North Bay, which were established in the 1950s as CBC affiliates and then reaffiliated with CTV in 1971 when J. Conrad Lavigne established new CBC stations in those markets; in Timmins, Lavigne's existing station CFCL retained its CBC affiliation and CTV service was provided by a rebroadcast transmitter of CKSO.

Until 1980, CKSO-2 and CFCL aggressively competed with each other for advertising dollars, leaving both in a precarious financial position due to the Timmins market's relatively small size. In 1980, the Canadian Radio-television and Telecommunications Commission (CRTC) approved the merger of Cambrian Broadcasting and Lavigne's Mid-Canada Communications into the MCTV twinstick. The station's callsign changed to CITO-TV at that time and it began operating as a standalone station.

In 1990, the stations were acquired by Baton Broadcasting. Baton subsequently became the sole corporate owner of CTV, and sold CFCL to the CBC in 2002.

== Transmitters ==
Station	City of licence	Channel	ERP	HAAT	Transmitter coordinates
CITO-TV-1	Kapuskasing	10 (VHF)	17.5 kW	102.5 m	49°23′28″N 82°21′27″W

These and many other CTV rebroadcasters nationwide were to shut down on or before August 31, 2009, as part of a political dispute with Canadian authorities on paid fee-for-carriage requirements for cable television operators. A subsequent change in ownership assigned full control of CTVglobemedia to Bell Media; as of 2011, these transmitters remain in normal licensed broadcast operation.

On February 11, 2016, Bell Media applied for its regular license renewals, which included applications to delete a long list of transmitters, including CITO-TV-3 and CITO-TV-4. Bell Media's rationale for deleting these analog repeaters is below:

"We are electing to delete these analog transmitters from the main licence with which they are associated. These analog transmitters generate no incremental revenue, attract little to no viewership given the growth of BDU or DTH subscriptions and are costly to maintain, repair or replace. In addition, none of the highlighted transmitters offer any programming that differs from the main channels. The Commission has determined that broadcasters may elect to shut down transmitters but will lose certain regulatory privileges (distribution on the basic service, the ability to request simultaneous substitution) as noted in Broadcasting Regulatory Policy CRTC 2015–24, Over-the-air transmission of television signals and local programming. We are fully aware of the loss of these regulatory privileges as a result of any transmitter shutdown."

At the same time, Bell Media applied to convert the licenses of CTV2 Atlantic (formerly ASN) and CTV2 Alberta (formerly ACCESS) from satellite-to-cable undertakings into television stations without transmitters (similar to cable-only network affiliates in the United States), and to reduce the level of educational content on CTV2 Alberta.

On July 30, 2019, Bell Media was granted permission to close down an additional transmitter as part of Broadcasting Decision CRTC 2019-268. The transmitter for CITO-TV-2 shut down by December 3, 2021.

=== Former transmitters ===
Station	City of licence	Channel	ERP	HAAT	Transmitter coordinates
CITO-TV-2	Kearns	11 (VHF)	325 kW	211.2 m	48°8′8″N 79°33′19″W
CITO-TV-3	Hearst	4 (VHF)	7.11 kW	165 m	49°38′50″N 83°30′50″W
CITO-TV-4	Chapleau	9 (VHF)	1.55 kW	131.4 m	47°51′15″N 83°25′8″W
