= CKAP-FM =

Radio station in Kapuskasing, Ontario

Coordinates: 49°23′24″N 82°23′32″W

- Kapuskasing, Ontario; Canada
- Frequency: 100.9 MHz
- Branding: 100.9 Moose FM

Programming
- Format: Adult contemporary

Ownership
- Owner: Vista Broadcast Group

History
- First air date: 1965
- Former frequencies: 580 kHz (AM) (1965–2001)
- Call sign meaning: Kapuskasing

Technical information
- Class: B
- ERP: 12 kW horizontal polarization only
- HAAT: 83 metres (272 ft)

Links
- Webcast: Listen Live
- Website: mykapuskasingnow.com

CKHT-FM
- Hearst, Ontario; Canada
- Frequency: 94.5 MHz

Programming
- Format: Adult contemporary

Ownership
- Owner: Vista Broadcast Group

History
- First air date: 2003
- Call sign meaning: "Hearst"

Technical information
- Class: A1
- ERP: 72 watts average 130 watts peak vertical polarization only
- HAAT: 50 metres (160 ft)

CKAP-FM is a Canadian radio station, which broadcasts at 100.9 FM in Kapuskasing, Ontario. The station airs an adult contemporary format branded as 100.9 Moose FM. CKAP also has a rebroadcaster in Hearst, CKHT-FM, at 94.5 FM.

The station was launched in 1965 by Kapuskasing Broadcasting, airing at 580 AM. It was acquired by Mid-Canada Communications in 1987, becoming part of the Mid-Canada Radio network. In 1990, Mid-Canada Radio was acquired by the Pelmorex Radio Network.

In 1999, the Pelmorex stations were sold to Haliburton Broadcasting Group. Haliburton converted CKAP to the FM band in 2001. Initially branded as Mix 100, the station adopted the Moose FM brand the following year.

In 2003, CKAP was authorized to add a rebroadcaster in Hearst to operate at 94.5 FM, as CKHT.

On July 30, 2010, Haliburton Broadcasting received CRTC approval to make a number of technical changes for CKHT-FM Hearst.

On April 23, 2012 Vista Broadcast Group, which owns a number of radio stations in western Canada, announced a deal to acquire Haliburton Broadcasting Group, in cooperation with Westerkirk Capital. The transaction was approved by the CRTC on October 19, 2012.
