= J. Conrad Lavigne =

Canadian businessman (1916–2003)

J. Conrad Lavigne, CM, O.Ont (November 2, 1916 – April 16, 2003) was a pioneering Canadian media proprietor.

Born in Chénéville, Quebec, Lavigne was raised in Cochrane, Ontario. He joined the Canadian Forces in 1942 and fought in World War II. When he returned to Canada following the war, he settled in Kirkland Lake, where he purchased the Prince George Hotel, working as joint owner from 1946 to 1948, He moved to Timmins and applied for a broadcasting license; CFCL went to air in 1952 as the first French language radio station in Ontario.

In 1956, Lavigne also received a television license. CFCL-TV went to air that year as a dual affiliate of the Canadian Broadcasting Corporation's English and French television networks. Lavigne subsequently added rebroadcast transmitters in several other communities. By 1965, he owned the largest private microwave transmission network in the world.

In 1971, Lavigne expanded into Sudbury and North Bay. CKNC in Sudbury and CHNB in North Bay went to air that year as CBC affiliates, while the former CBC affiliates in those cities, CKSO and CKNY, reaffiliated with CTV, and their owner, Cambrian Broadcasting, established a new CTV station, CITO, in Timmins. In 1974, Lavigne also acquired CHRO in Pembroke.

By 1980, Lavigne divested himself of his broadcast holdings, primarily because he was refused permission to operate a cable service in the north, as authorities feared a monopoly. His communication companies were in a financial crisis, due to aggressive competition for advertising dollars in small markets. As a result, the Canadian Radio-television and Telecommunications Commission approved a merger into the MCTV twinstick. In the end, his private network stretched from Moosonee to Ottawa, and from Hearst and Chapleau to Matagami, Quebec. He was serving a population of 1.5 million.

In 1983, Lavigne received an honorary doctorate from Sudbury's Laurentian University, and was named a member of the Order of Canada, in recognition of his pioneering contributions to Canadian broadcasting. He was also named to the Order of Ontario in 1994, and to the Canadian Communications Foundation's Broadcasting Hall of Fame.

In his later years, Lavigne was a prominent residential real estate developer in Timmins, and as a director of the National Bank of Canada. Lavigne died in Timmins on April 16, 2003.
