= Chondroitin B lyase =

Enzyme

Identifiers
- EC no.: 4.2.2.19
- CAS no.: 52227-83-5

Databases
- IntEnz: IntEnz view
- BRENDA: BRENDA entry
- ExPASy: NiceZyme view
- KEGG: KEGG entry
- MetaCyc: metabolic pathway
- PRIAM: profile
- PDB structures: RCSB PDB PDBe PDBsum
Search
- PMC: articles
- PubMed: articles
- NCBI: proteins

The enzyme chondroitin B lyase (EC 4.2.2.19) catalyzes the following process:

Eliminative cleavage of dermatan sulfate containing (1→4)-β-D-hexosaminyl and (1→3)-β-D-glucurosonyl or (1→3)-α-L-iduronosyl linkages to disaccharides containing 4-deoxy-β-D-gluc-4-enuronosyl groups to yield a 4,5-unsaturated dermatan-sulfate disaccharide (ΔUA-GalNAc-4S).

Glossary:

This enzyme belongs to the family of lyases, specifically those carbon-oxygen lyases acting on polysaccharides. The systematic name of this enzyme class is chondroitin B lyase. Other names in common use include chondroitinase B, ChonB, and ChnB.
