= CKNC-TV =

Television station in Sudbury (1971–2002)

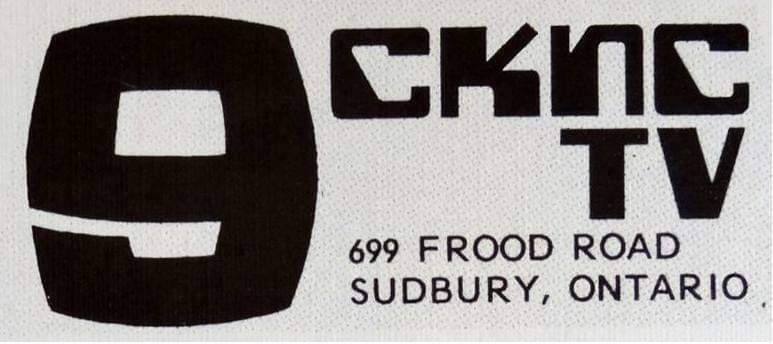
- CKNC-TV 9 logo from the 1970s with its former Frood Road studio address in Sudbury which is now the current home of CICI-TV/CTV Northern Ontario.
- Sudbury, Ontario; Canada
- Channels: Analog: 9 (VHF)
- Branding: MCTV CBC

Programming
- Affiliations: CBC

Ownership
- Owner: J. Conrad Lavigne (1971–1980); Mid-Canada Communications (1980–1990); Baton Broadcasting/CTV Inc. (1990–2002)
- Sister stations: CICI-TV

History
- First air date: October 8, 1971
- Last air date: October 27, 2002; (31 years, 19 days)
- Call sign meaning: Nickel Capital

Technical information
- ERP: 198.1 kW
- HAAT: 221 m (725 ft)
- Transmitter coordinates: 46°30′2″N 81°1′12″W
- Translator(s): see § Transmitters

CKNC-TV (channel 9) was a television station in Sudbury, Ontario, Canada. The station was in operation from 1971 to 2002 as a private affiliate of CBC Television, and then continued until 2012 as a network-owned rebroadcaster of CBLT in Toronto.

== History ==
CKNC was established on October 8, 1971 by J. Conrad Lavigne, the owner of CFCL in Timmins. On the same day, the existing television station in Sudbury, CKSO, switched its affiliation to CTV. A rebroadcaster with the call sign CKNC-TV-1 went to air in Elliot Lake on the same date. That transmitter was sold to the CBC in 1982 and changed its callsign to CBEC-TV, although it continued to air CKNC's signal for the remainder of the station's existence.

Until 1980, CICI and CKNC aggressively competed with each other for advertising dollars, leaving both in a precarious financial position due to the Sudbury market's relatively small size. In 1980, the Canadian Radio-television and Telecommunications Commission approved the merger of the two stations, along with their co-owned stations in North Bay and Timmins, into the MCTV twinstick.

In 1990, the MCTV stations were acquired by Baton Broadcasting, which became the sole corporate owner of CTV in 1997.

In the early 1990s, CKNC-TV decreased its effective radiated power from 168,000 to 115,500 watts; and changing the transmitter location to a new site located approximately 1.5 kilometres to the southwest of the present location.

=== End of operations ===
CTV subsequently sold its four CBC affiliates in Northern Ontario, CKNC, CHNB in North Bay, CJIC in Sault Ste. Marie and CFCL in Timmins directly to the CBC in 2002. All four ceased to exist as separate stations on October 27, 2002, becoming rebroadcasters of Toronto's CBLT, with CKNC's call sign changing to CBLT-6. These transmitters would close on July 31, 2012, due to budget cuts affecting the CBC.

== Transmitters ==
Station	City of licence	Channel	ERP	HAAT	Transmitter coordinates	Notes
CBCE-TV	Little Current	16 (UHF)	59.2 kW	254 m	45°56′1″N 81°59′32″W	Decision CRTC 82-303, (Page 5 and 6) April 8, 1982
CBEC-TV	Elliot Lake	7 (VHF)	67.9 kW	173.5 m	46°23′16″N 82°37′16″W	70-211, (Page 211 and 212) August 5, 1970. Was CKNC-TV-1 until it became CBEC-TV in the 1980s

== Other notes ==
CKNC was also the original call sign, in the 1920s and 1930s, of a radio station in Toronto that is now known as CJBC. The CKNC call sign currently belongs to a radio station in Simcoe, Ontario, as CKNC-FM.
