= Kapuskasing =

Town in Ontario, Canada

- Town (single-tier)
- Town of Kapuskasing; Ville de Kapuskasing (French)
- Aerial view of Kapuskasing
- Motto: Model Town of the North
- Location within Ontario
- Coordinates: 49°25′N 82°26′W
- Country: Canada
- Province: Ontario
- District: Cochrane
- Established: 1911

Government
  - Type: Town
  - Mayor: David Plourde
  - Governing Body: Kapuskasing Town Council
  - MP: Gaétan Malette (Conservative)
  - MPP: Guy Bourgouin (NDP)

Area
  - Land: 83.98 km^{2} (32.42 sq mi)
- Elevation: 217.90 m (714.9 ft)

Population (2021)
  - Total: 8,057
  - Density: 95.9/km^{2} (248/sq mi)
- Time zone: UTC-5 (EST)
  - Summer (DST): UTC-4 (EDT)
- Forward sortation area: P5N
- Area code: 705
- Website: www.kapuskasing.ca

Kapuskasing (/ˌkæpəsˈkeɪsɪŋ/ KAP-əss-KAY-sing) is a town on the Kapuskasing River in the Cochrane District of Northern Ontario, Canada, approximately 92 kilometres (57 mi) east of Hearst and 130 kilometres (81 mi) northwest of Timmins. The town was known as MacPherson until 1917.

== Etymology ==
The town of Kapuskasing gets its name from the Kapuskasing River. The first reported survey of the district in which Kapuskasing lies was carried out in 1875 by Dr. Robert Bell of the Geological Survey of Canada. He referred to the Kapuskasing River as the "Kai-bush-ka-sing". According to Bell's information, the Kapuskasing River derived its name from the lake at its head.

In 1900, the Bureau of Colonization of the Ontario Department of Agriculture sent parties to survey the region north of the Canadian Pacific Railway between the Quebec border and Lake Nipigon. Their main interest was to seek out and delimit areas for further agricultural settlements that would give Ontario a new farming frontier to offset the attraction of the western prairies.

In 1900, the Department of Crown Lands commissioned a Survey of Exploration of Northern Ontario. Survey parties were sent out to explore, document and report back to the Province on the various resources of water power, timber, etc., that might be available for exploitation. No roads existed, but northern Cree Indians and fur traders had used the local rivers connecting to James Bay for centuries. In the summer of 1900 groups of surveyors traveled the many rivers of this remote area documenting their findings. The results were published by order of the Legislative Assembly of Ontario as "Report of the Survey of Exploration of Northern Ontario 1900". The section of the report detailing the exploration of the Kapuskasing River contains references to the local Cree names for Sturgeon Falls, White Spruce Rapids, Kapuskasing River, and Big Beaver Falls, among others. Surveyors who explored the Kapuskasing River and tributaries in 1900 had local Cree guides familiar with the country who provided the local place names and their meanings to them. In this report the word Kapuskasing is said to mean "Whispering Water".

At the location where the CNR crossed the Kapuskasing River in 1910, there was an island in the centre of the river. Power and storage dams were built at that location in 1923. Prior to the dam construction, the rapids at that location was known as "White Spruce Rapids" and later known simply as "Spruce Falls". The first Spruce Falls Company of 1920 took its name from these rapids.

== Geography ==
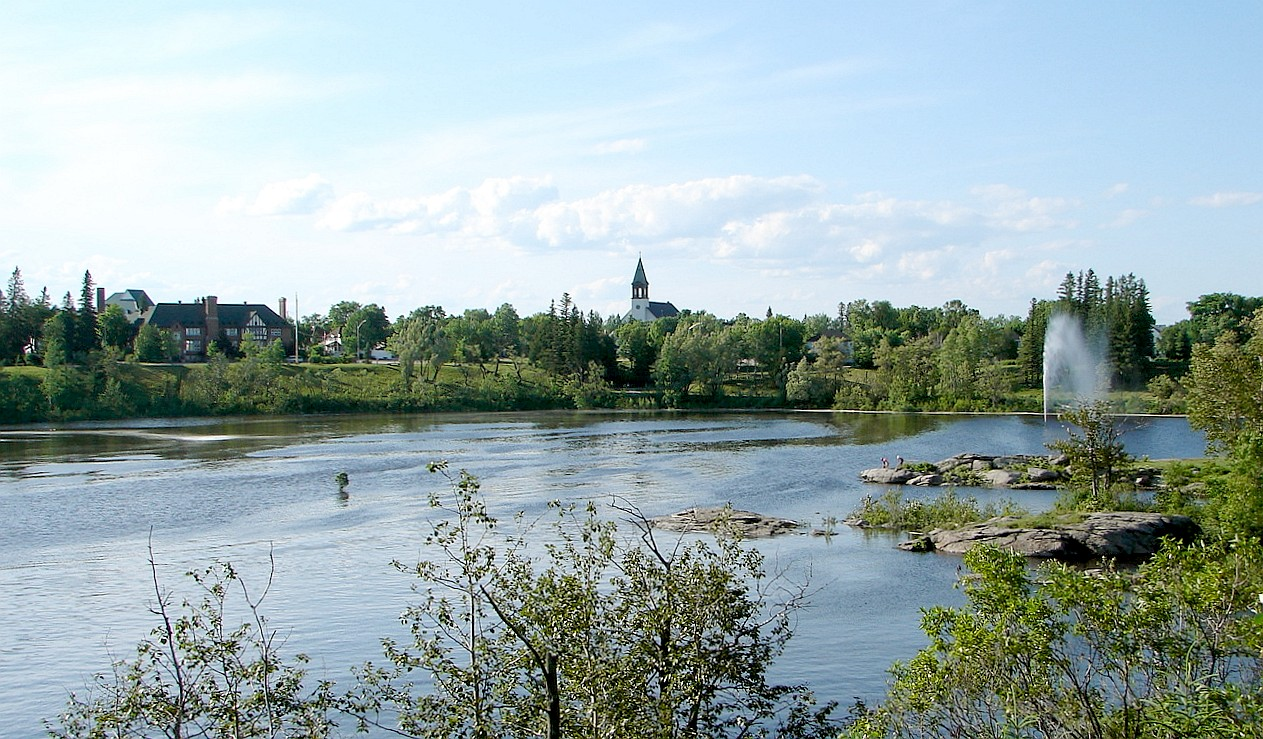
Kapuskasing as seen across the Kapuskasing River

Kapuskasing lies in the heart of the Great Clay Belt. The topography of the region is very flat, dotted with numerous small lakes and muskeg bogs. Also in the heart of Canada's boreal forest, the region is drained by rivers running north to James Bay. The district is heavily forested, mostly by thick stands of black spruce that have commercial value as pulpwood.

Wildlife is abundant. Species such as moose, black bear, lynx and red fox are commonly seen in the area. Lakes and rivers are well populated with walleye, northern pike and yellow perch. Fishing and hunting are very popular recreational activities locally.

=== Climate ===
Kapuskasing has a humid, continental climate (Koppen Dfb). Kapuskasing has long, cold winters and warm, sometimes humid summers. Spring and autumn are relatively short transitional seasons. Visitors often comment on the deep blue of the sky during clear weather.

Climate data for Kapuskasing Airport (1991–2020 normals, extremes 1937–present)
Month	Jan	Feb	Mar	Apr	May	Jun	Jul	Aug	Sep	Oct	Nov	Dec	Year
Record high humidex	5.7	11.1	21.8	31.7	43.2	43.9	44.6	44.6	40.6	31.5	21.2	16.0	44.6
Record high °C (°F)	8.3 (46.9)	12.2 (54.0)	26.2 (79.2)	29.7 (85.5)	34.6 (94.3)	38.3 (100.9)	36.7 (98.1)	35.0 (95.0)	33.3 (91.9)	27.8 (82.0)	20.3 (68.5)	13.3 (55.9)	38.3 (100.9)
Mean maximum °C (°F)	1.2 (34.2)	3.0 (37.4)	11.2 (52.2)	19.2 (66.6)	28.1 (82.6)	31.0 (87.8)	30.9 (87.6)	30.4 (86.7)	26.9 (80.4)	20.5 (68.9)	11.0 (51.8)	3.4 (38.1)	32.7 (90.9)
Mean daily maximum °C (°F)	−11.5 (11.3)	−8.5 (16.7)	−1.1 (30.0)	6.9 (44.4)	16.0 (60.8)	22.0 (71.6)	24.1 (75.4)	22.6 (72.7)	17.4 (63.3)	8.5 (47.3)	0.1 (32.2)	−7.4 (18.7)	7.4 (45.3)
Daily mean °C (°F)	−17.4 (0.7)	−15.4 (4.3)	−8.2 (17.2)	0.5 (32.9)	9.1 (48.4)	15.0 (59.0)	17.7 (63.9)	16.3 (61.3)	11.6 (52.9)	4.2 (39.6)	−3.8 (25.2)	−12.2 (10.0)	1.4 (34.5)
Mean daily minimum °C (°F)	−23.3 (−9.9)	−22.3 (−8.1)	−15.4 (4.3)	−6.0 (21.2)	2.0 (35.6)	8.0 (46.4)	11.2 (52.2)	9.9 (49.8)	5.8 (42.4)	−0.1 (31.8)	−7.6 (18.3)	−16.9 (1.6)	−4.6 (23.7)
Mean minimum °C (°F)	−38.0 (−36.4)	−36.4 (−33.5)	−32.0 (−25.6)	−18.0 (−0.4)	−5.9 (21.4)	−0.8 (30.6)	3.6 (38.5)	2.1 (35.8)	−2.4 (27.7)	−7.6 (18.3)	−20.8 (−5.4)	−32.1 (−25.8)	−39.1 (−38.4)
Record low °C (°F)	−45.3 (−49.5)	−43.3 (−45.9)	−42.2 (−44.0)	−28.3 (−18.9)	−13.0 (8.6)	−4.4 (24.1)	−0.6 (30.9)	−2.8 (27.0)	−6.1 (21.0)	−17.7 (0.1)	−34.4 (−29.9)	−44.4 (−47.9)	−45.3 (−49.5)
Record low wind chill	−55.8	−54.8	−48.5	−34.2	−22.0	−8.6	0.0	−4.6	−9.6	−21.1	−41.8	−54.9	−55.8
Average precipitation mm (inches)	47.9 (1.89)	32.6 (1.28)	45.0 (1.77)	58.1 (2.29)	66.9 (2.63)	74.2 (2.92)	99.0 (3.90)	78.8 (3.10)	99.3 (3.91)	84.9 (3.34)	66.5 (2.62)	53.1 (2.09)	806.2 (31.74)
Average rainfall mm (inches)	1.6 (0.06)	1.2 (0.05)	9.4 (0.37)	28.8 (1.13)	61.4 (2.42)	73.0 (2.87)	106.5 (4.19)	79.9 (3.15)	101.6 (4.00)	67.5 (2.66)	22.8 (0.90)	5.3 (0.21)	558.9 (22.00)
Average snowfall cm (inches)	53.9 (21.2)	39.6 (15.6)	41.8 (16.5)	33.5 (13.2)	6.0 (2.4)	0.4 (0.2)	0.1 (0.0)	0.0 (0.0)	0.8 (0.3)	17.4 (6.9)	52.2 (20.6)	57.2 (22.5)	303.0 (119.3)
Average precipitation days (≥ 0.2 mm)	17.7	14.2	14.6	11.9	12.9	14.6	16.0	15.1	16.4	18.0	19.0	19.3	189.8
Average rainy days (≥ 0.2 mm)	1.1	0.64	2.9	7.2	11.9	14.4	16.2	15.0	16.5	14.6	6.5	2.6	109.6
Average snowy days (≥ 0.2 cm)	17.8	14.6	13.4	7.8	2.4	0.15	0.04	0.0	0.52	7.0	16.4	19.5	99.6
Average relative humidity (%) (at 15:00)	72.3	63.6	55.6	50.4	49.3	52.0	57.0	58.2	63.3	69.0	76.2	78.9	62.1
Average dew point °C (°F)	−20.1 (−4.2)	−18.8 (−1.8)	−13.3 (8.1)	−6.5 (20.3)	1.5 (34.7)	8.2 (46.8)	11.9 (53.4)	11.2 (52.2)	7.6 (45.7)	0.9 (33.6)	−6.1 (21.0)	−14.2 (6.4)	−3.1 (26.4)
Source 1: Environment and Climate Change Canada
Source 2: weatherstats.ca (for dewpoint and monthly&yearly average absolute maximum&minimum temperature)

Climate data for Kapuskasing CDA (1981–2010 normals, extremes 1918–2001)
Month	Jan	Feb	Mar	Apr	May	Jun	Jul	Aug	Sep	Oct	Nov	Dec	Year
Record high °C (°F)	8.3 (46.9)	11.7 (53.1)	19.4 (66.9)	29.5 (85.1)	33.3 (91.9)	37.0 (98.6)	38.3 (100.9)	35.0 (95.0)	32.8 (91.0)	27.8 (82.0)	20.0 (68.0)	15.6 (60.1)	38.3 (100.9)
Mean daily maximum °C (°F)	−12.3 (9.9)	−8.3 (17.1)	−1.9 (28.6)	7.0 (44.6)	15.7 (60.3)	20.9 (69.6)	23.5 (74.3)	22.1 (71.8)	15.9 (60.6)	8.3 (46.9)	−0.6 (30.9)	−8.4 (16.9)	6.8 (44.2)
Daily mean °C (°F)	−18.6 (−1.5)	−15.1 (4.8)	−8.5 (16.7)	0.8 (33.4)	9.1 (48.4)	14.5 (58.1)	17.2 (63.0)	16.1 (61.0)	10.9 (51.6)	4.2 (39.6)	−4.2 (24.4)	−13.2 (8.2)	1.1 (34.0)
Mean daily minimum °C (°F)	−24.8 (−12.6)	−22.0 (−7.6)	−15.1 (4.8)	−5.3 (22.5)	2.5 (36.5)	8.0 (46.4)	10.9 (51.6)	10.0 (50.0)	5.8 (42.4)	0.0 (32.0)	−7.8 (18.0)	−18.0 (−0.4)	−4.7 (23.5)
Record low °C (°F)	−47.2 (−53.0)	−46.7 (−52.1)	−42.8 (−45.0)	−30.6 (−23.1)	−13.0 (8.6)	−6.7 (19.9)	−1.0 (30.2)	−3.9 (25.0)	−7.0 (19.4)	−15.6 (3.9)	−36.1 (−33.0)	−47.2 (−53.0)	−47.2 (−53.0)
Average precipitation mm (inches)	50.8 (2.00)	36.9 (1.45)	48.9 (1.93)	55.2 (2.17)	67.1 (2.64)	85.4 (3.36)	102.8 (4.05)	78.7 (3.10)	96.0 (3.78)	91.8 (3.61)	70.1 (2.76)	55.1 (2.17)	838.6 (33.02)
Average rainfall mm (inches)	0.1 (0.00)	3.5 (0.14)	11.2 (0.44)	30.7 (1.21)	61.8 (2.43)	85.3 (3.36)	102.3 (4.03)	78.7 (3.10)	95.3 (3.75)	72.8 (2.87)	23.5 (0.93)	5.1 (0.20)	570.3 (22.45)
Average snowfall cm (inches)	53.5 (21.1)	36.2 (14.3)	37.3 (14.7)	23.3 (9.2)	4.8 (1.9)	0.1 (0.0)	0.5 (0.2)	0.0 (0.0)	0.7 (0.3)	18.9 (7.4)	45.5 (17.9)	53.3 (21.0)	274.1 (107.9)
Average precipitation days (≥ 0.2 mm)	16.1	12.1	11.3	9.6	13.1	16.2	16.1	14.7	20.0	18.0	17.1	17.5	181.6
Average rainy days (≥ 0.2 mm)	0.19	0.76	2.7	5.5	12.4	16.2	16.1	14.7	20.0	14.7	4.9	1.1	109.1
Average snowy days (≥ 0.2 cm)	15.9	11.3	9.4	5.1	1.2	0.05	0.05	0.0	0.43	5.7	13.2	16.6	78.9
Mean monthly sunshine hours	78.3	109.5	146.7	185.9	220.8	226.2	252.5	224.6	127.5	88.0	48.3	55.4	1,763.7
Percentage possible sunshine	29.1	38.4	39.9	45.2	46.5	46.6	51.5	50.3	33.6	26.3	17.6	21.6	37.2
Source: Environment and Climate Change Canada

== History ==
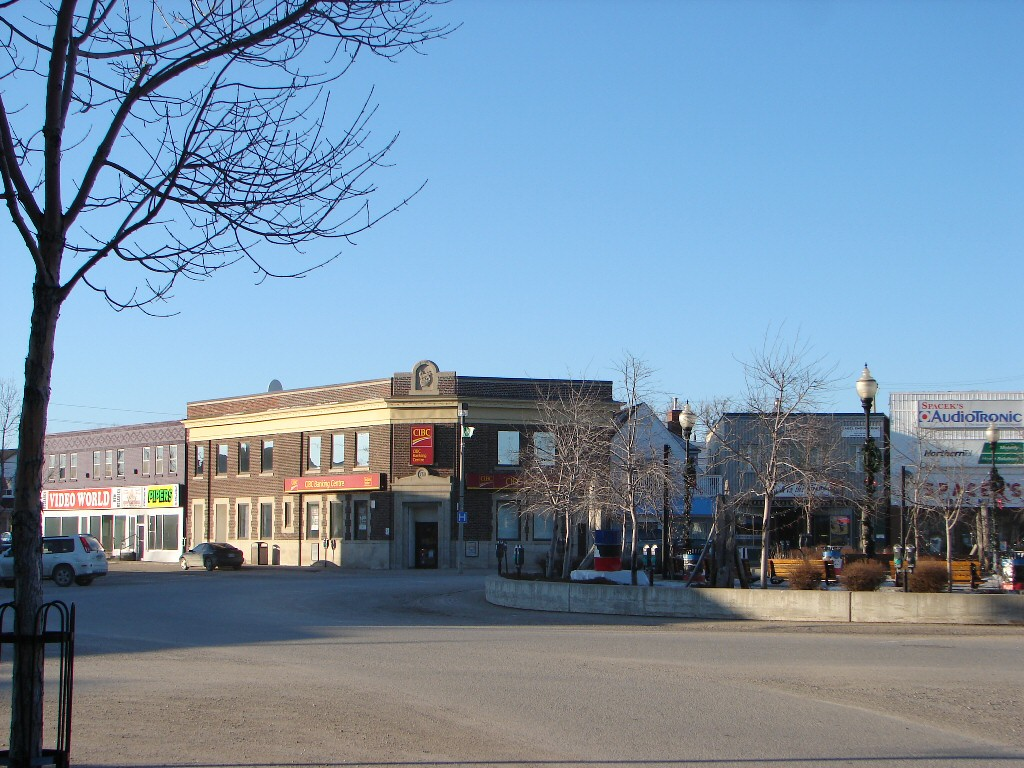
Town centre of Kapuskasing

Located near the western edge of the Clay Belt of "New Ontario", the town was founded in the early 20th century after the National Transcontinental Railway, forerunner of the Canadian National Railway, was built through the area in 1911. An Ontario Historical Plaque was erected by the province to commemorate the founding of Kapuskasing's role in Ontario's heritage.

A post-war scheme to settle Canadian Corps combat veterans in the area proved unsuccessful. It was not until the start of pulp and paper milling operations in the 1920s that Kapuskasing began to develop as an organized community.

=== Val Albert ===
Name taken from that of an early settler and assigned by postal authorities on October 7, 1936, "to correspond with the village known as {Val} Albert" (CPCGN files). Val Albert Improvement District, along with some unorganized area, was annexed by Kapuskasing in 1964.

=== Spruce Falls ===
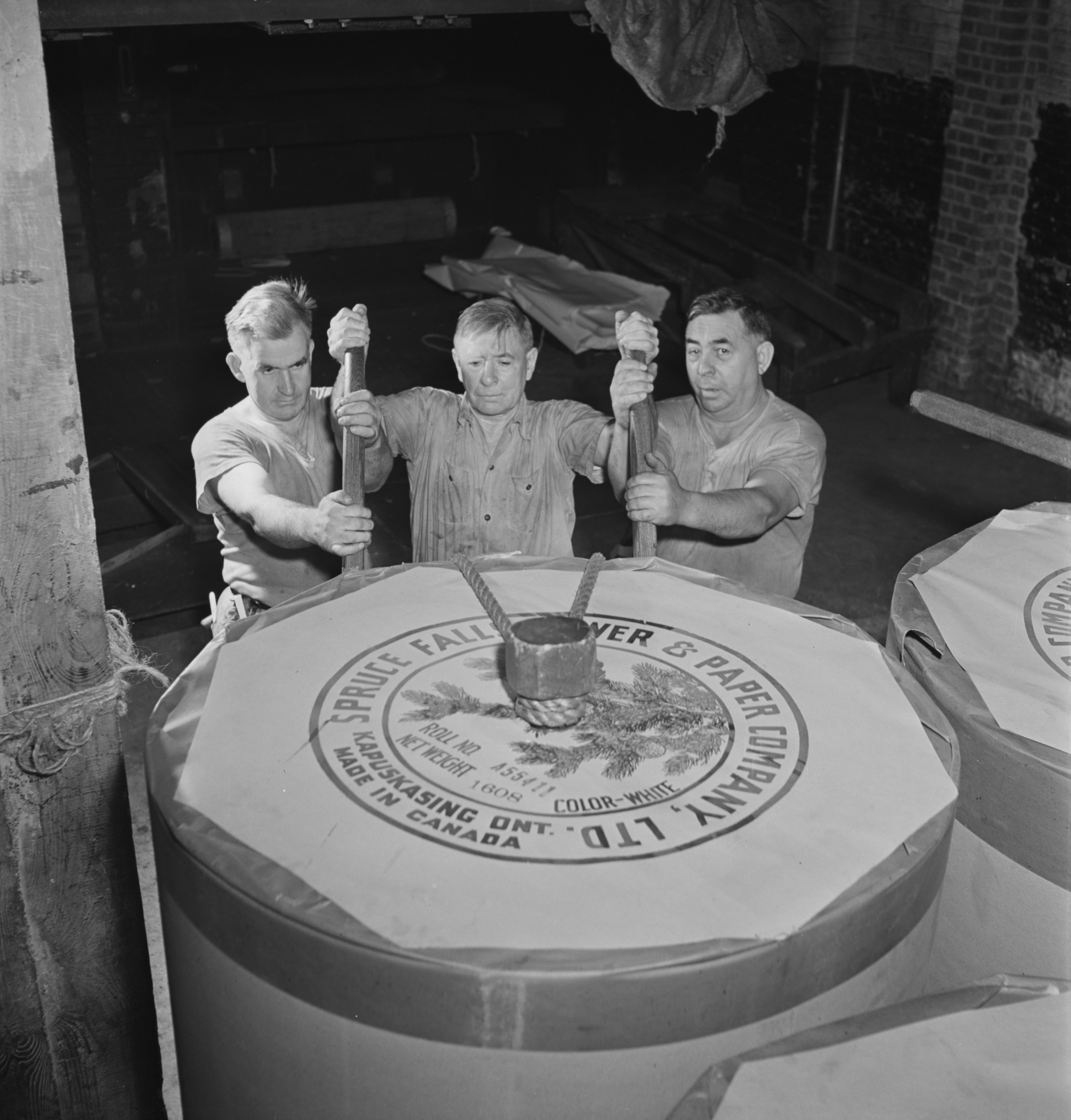
Reel room at the New York Times in 1942, with Spruce Falls Power and Paper Company paper reel

The Kapuskasing River Pulp and Timber limit, that included 4,500 square kilometres (1,700 sq mi) of timber and hydro leases at Sturgeon Falls, White Spruce Rapids (Spruce Falls) and Big Beaver Falls, was awarded to speculators Saphrenous A. Mundy and Elihu Stewart in 1917, and Spruce Falls Pulp and Paper Ltd. was incorporated, but no development took place.

The still unexploited timber limits were sold to Kimberly-Clark in 1920. The new Spruce Falls Company Ltd. began the development of the first pulp mill in Kapuskasing under the direction of F.J. Sensenbrenner, a Vice President of Kimberly Clark Corporation for the next 20 years. The small sulphite mill started up in late 1922 with four 12-ton digesters and a daily output of 75 tons of pulp. Spent liquor was discharged untreated into the Kapuskasing River.

Early development was plagued by major setbacks. Fire destroyed the construction camp and power project at Sturgeon Falls. A year's supply of pulpwood that was boomed up in the river was washed away in the spring flood. A fire at the new mill killed two workers and brought production to a halt.

In 1923, a water storage and hydro electric dam was built by Morrow and Beatty Ltd. of Peterborough at Spruce Falls. In 1925, the Spruce Falls Company Limited was awarded additional timber limits to the north and south, bringing their total limits up to 11,830 square kilometres (4,570 sq mi).

In 1926, the Spruce Falls Power and Paper Company was incorporated under joint ownership of Kimberly-Clark and The New York Times. The new company negotiated two additional hydro power leases to the north on the Mattagami River at Smoky Falls and Devils Rapids. Work to build a 550 ton/day paper mill at Kapuskasing, a 75,000 HP hydro generating station at Smoky Falls and an 80 kilometres (50 mi) railway and power line connecting the two got underway in the spring of 1926. The contractor for the entire project was Morrow and Beatty Ltd. of Peterborough.

From July 13, 1928 until 2003, The New York Times was printed entirely on Spruce Falls paper. Facing massive modernization costs, The Times and Kimberly-Clark sold their stakes in the mill to its employees and Tembec Inc. in 1991. Even after selling the mill, The Times remained a legacy customer. However, they officially ceased using Kapuskasing newsprint in 2003.

The company became known locally as "Uncle Spruce" in affectionate reference to the steady work and benefits provided to this distinct northern community for many decades.

The mill was the focus of the Reesor Siding 1963 Strike, which saw three union workers killed. In 1997, Tembec became the sole owner of the mill which is now known as Tembec — Spruce Falls Operations.

=== Kapuskasing Inn ===
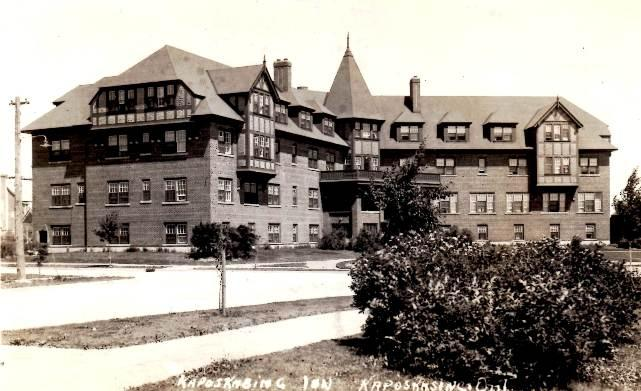
View of Kapuskasing Inn, 1943

The Kapuskasing Inn was built in 1927–28 by George Roper Gouinlock, son of George Wallace Gouinlock, together with the Civic Centre (built 1928) and the former Sensenbrenner Hospital (built 1929, now Drury Place, a geared-to-income housing complex). They were commissioned by the Spruce Falls Company Ltd. These buildings were all built in an impressive Neo-Tudor style and would form the nucleus of the town. In 1951, the inn hosted Princess Elizabeth and the Duke of Edinburgh on their first visit to Canada.

The landmark inn closed in 2002 and fell in disrepair but was slated for renovation by new investors. On May 22, 2007, youths set fire to the inn. It was damaged beyond repair. The arsonists were not charged as they were below the age of criminal responsibility at the time of the fire. The remains of the inn were demolished in May and June 2008.

=== Internment camp ===
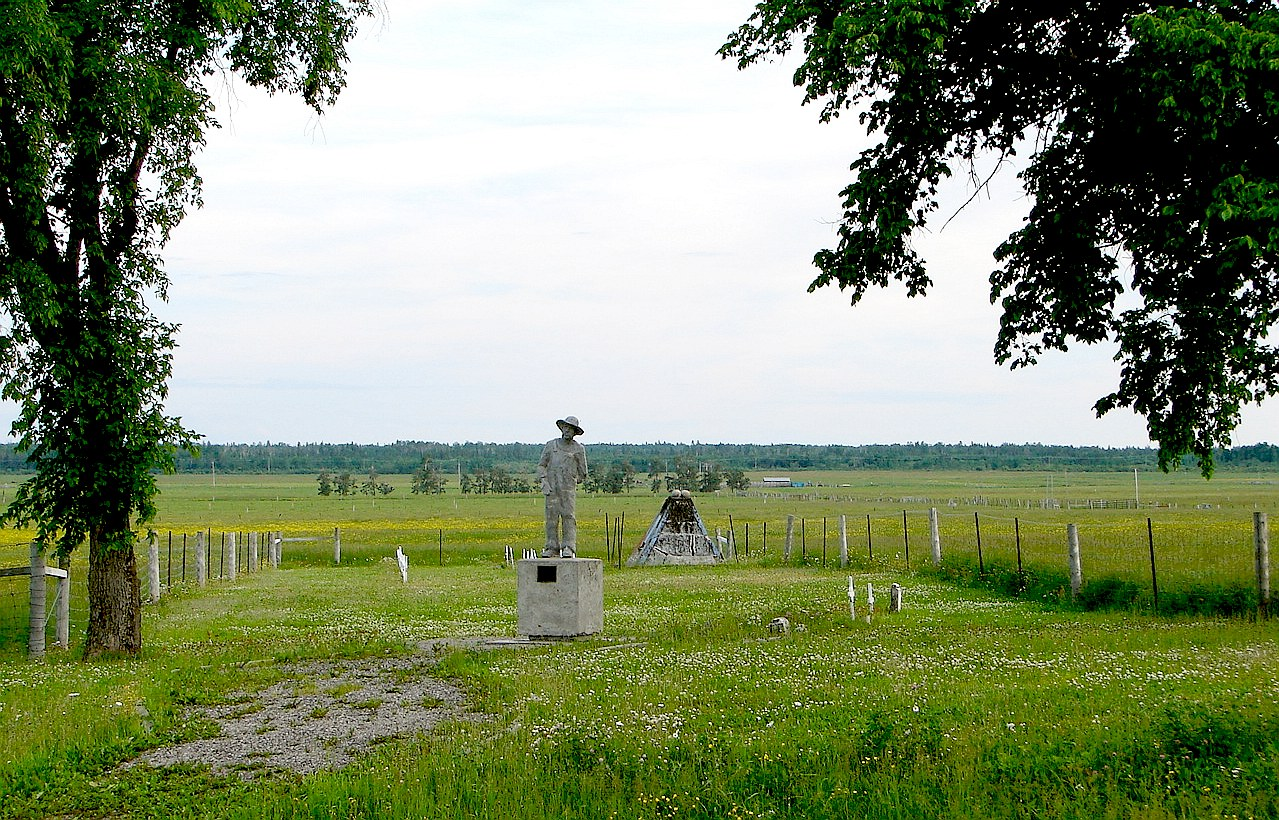
Ukrainian Cemetery of Kapuskasing Internment Camp

During World War I, the town was the site of one of the largest internment camps in Canada, at Bunk Houses in Kapuskasing from December 1914 to February 1920. The camp held over 1,300 German, Austrian, and Turkish prisoners, though originally the majority were civilian internees of Ukrainian descent who had emigrated from the provinces of Bukovina and Galicia, their homeland, which at the time were part of the Austro-Hungarian Empire, in the first wave of Ukrainian emigration to Canada prior to 1914. Prisoners were employed in the construction of buildings and clearing of land for a government experimental farm on the west side of the Kapuskasing River. Isolation provided ideal security for the minimum security camp, as the railway was the only access to the remote location. Prisoners who attempted to escape into the bush were turned back by endless muskeg and clouds of mosquitoes or minus-40 degree temperatures in winter. In 1917, most were paroled to help relieve labour shortages. Afterwards, the camp was used for prisoners of war and political radicals until its closure in 1920.

While serving as camp paymaster at Kapuskasing during its use for POWs, Captain Watson Kirkconnell, who was later to become a highly important figure in Canadian poetry, helped prevent a prisoner uprising and, on two occasions, he also discovered and foiled attempts to tunnel out of the camp.

Despite years of grief over the combat death of his brother, Captain Kirkconnell later wrote, "Generally speaking, I could feel little animus against our German prisoners. Guarding them was simply a job. It was their duty to try to get away and our duty to prevent it. The ingenuity that they displayed in their attempts to escape was being duplicated by our men in German captivity."

A small cemetery is all that remains of the internment camp near the Kapuskasing Airport where victims of the 1918 influenza epidemic were laid to rest. An Ontario Historical Plaque was erected by the province to commemorate the Kapuskasing Internment Camp's role in Ontario's heritage.

=== Kapuskasing Soldier Colony ===
Governments of the day were mistakenly impressed with the agricultural potential of the Great Clay Belt. A federal government experimental farm had been established on the west side of the river to explore and develop crops and systems for farming the area. Under the Returned Soldiers and Sailors Act of 1917, the Kapuskasing Soldier Colony was established to settle veterans returned from the Great War. Settlers received homesteads, grants, and guaranteed loans and were paid for clearing their own land. However, by 1920 only nine of more than 100 original settlers remained, and the project was discontinued.

A 1920 Commission of Enquiry into the failed settlement scheme found that the settlers had not been up to the task at hand. The inhospitable climate and geography had won out. One bitter settler testified, "There are 7 months snow, two months rain and the remainder mosquitoes and black flies." Settlers had also counted on the development of a pulp mill at Kapuskasing that would provide a local market for pulp wood.

=== Radar site ===
During World War II, Kapuskasing was one of five Northern Ontario radar bases that were set up to watch for potential attacks on the Soo Locks in Sault Ste. Marie, Michigan. Kapuskasing was the headquarters for the radar bases, which were manned by the United States Army Air Forces. The town may have ceased its importance as a location for a traditional military radar base, but has become a site for the Super Dual Auroral Radar Network that is involved with tracking and measuring ionospheric turbulence.

== Demographics ==
In the 2021 Census of Population conducted by Statistics Canada, Kapuskasing had a population of 8,057 living in 3,790 of its 4,134 total private dwellings, a change of −2.8% from its 2016 population of 8,292. With a land area of 83.98 km^{2} (32.42 sq mi), it had a population density of 95.9/km^{2} (248.5/sq mi) in 2021.

In 2021, 63.3% of the population identified French as its mother tongue, 29.5% identified English as its mother tongue, and 1.8% identified a non-official language as its first language (Cree etc.); 4.9% identified both French and English.

Canada census – Kapuskasing community profile

	2021	2016	2011
Population	8,057 (-2.8% from 2016)	8,292 (1.2% from 2011)	8,196 (-3.7% from 2006)
Land area	83.98 km^{2} (32.42 sq mi)	84.37 km^{2} (32.58 sq mi)	84.13 km^{2} (32.48 sq mi)
Population density	95.9/km^{2} (248/sq mi)	98.3/km^{2} (255/sq mi)	97.4/km^{2} (252/sq mi)
Median age	48.4 (M: 47.2, F: 50.0)	44.2 (M: 43.6, F: 44.9)
Private dwellings	4,134 (total) 3,790 (occupied)	4,087 (total) 3,801 (occupied)	4,049 (total)
Median household income	$69,000	$60,019

References: 2021 2016 2011

Canada 2016 Census		Population	% of Total Population
Visible minority group Source:	South Asian	10	0.1
Visible minority group Source:	Chinese	40	0.5
Visible minority group Source:	Black	10	0.1
Visible minority group Source:	Filipino	15	0.2
Visible minority group Source:	Latin American	10	0.1
Visible minority group Source:	Arab	10	0.1
Visible minority group Source:	Korean	15	0.2
Total visible minority population		110	1.4
Aboriginal group Source:	First Nations	560	6.9
Aboriginal group Source:	Métis	365	4.5
Aboriginal group Source:	Inuit	25	0.3
Total Aboriginal population		950	11.7
White		7,055	86.9
Total population		8,115	100.0

Historical census populations – Kapuskasing

Year	Pop.	±%
1921	926	—
1931	3,819	+312.4%
1941	3,431	−10.2%
1951	4,687	+36.6%
1956	5,463	+16.6%
1961	6,870	+25.8%

Year	Pop.	±%
1966	12,617	+83.7%
1971	12,834	+1.7%
1976	12,676	−1.2%
1981	12,014	−5.2%
1986	11,378	−5.3%
1991	10,344	−9.1%

Year	Pop.	±%
1996	10,036	−3.0%
2001	9,238	−8.0%
2006	8,509	−7.9%
2011	8,196	−3.7%
2016	8,292	+1.2%
2021	8,057	−2.8%

Population counts are not adjusted for boundary changes.
Source: Statistics Canada

== Economy ==
The former Spruce Falls, now GreenFirst Forest Products, had purchased the site from Rayonier Advanced Materials (RYAM) in 2021. The pulp and paper mill is the town's major employer, soon to be replaced by the Ontario Power Generation's Smoky Falls Dam reconstruction site. A former employer was also the Agrium phosphate mine which shut down in 2013. General Motors Canada operates the GM Cold Weather Development Centre in Kapuskasing. Agriculture and Agri-Food Canada operated an agricultural experiment station, or Experimental Farm, close to the town; the Experimental Farm closed in 2014.

In late September 2025 the Paper Mill announced that it would shutdown after a deal with the Ontario Government fell through. The day after the shutdown became official,a rally was held in front of Mill. Many individuals and groups, school classes, union workers and local figures such as mayors of localities (notably the mayor of Cochrane) and the local MPP Guy Bourgouin). During his speech Bourgouin blamed the Ford government for the shutdown.

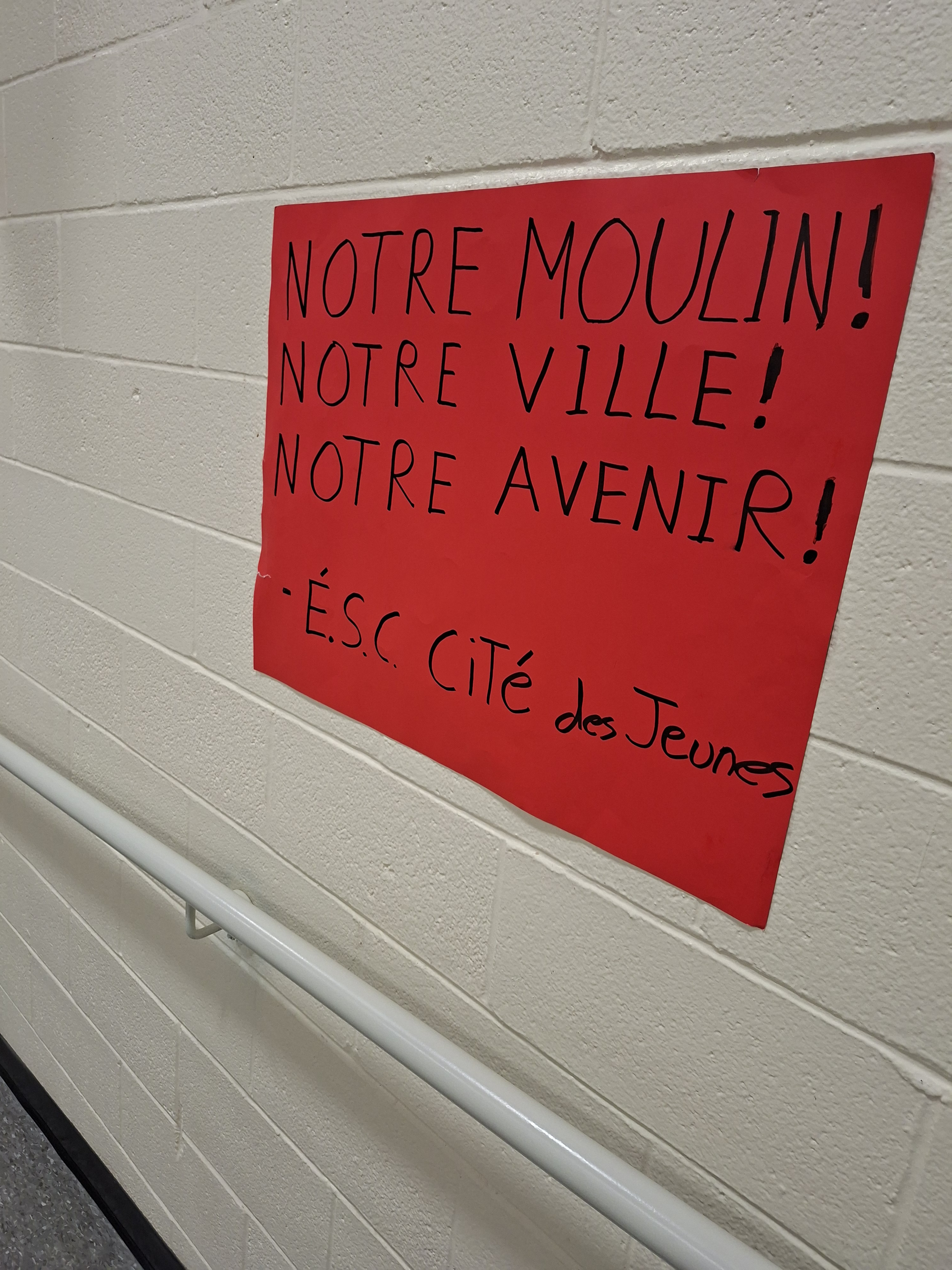
French Protest Sign

In mid October a deal was concluded and the Mill announced it will resume operations.

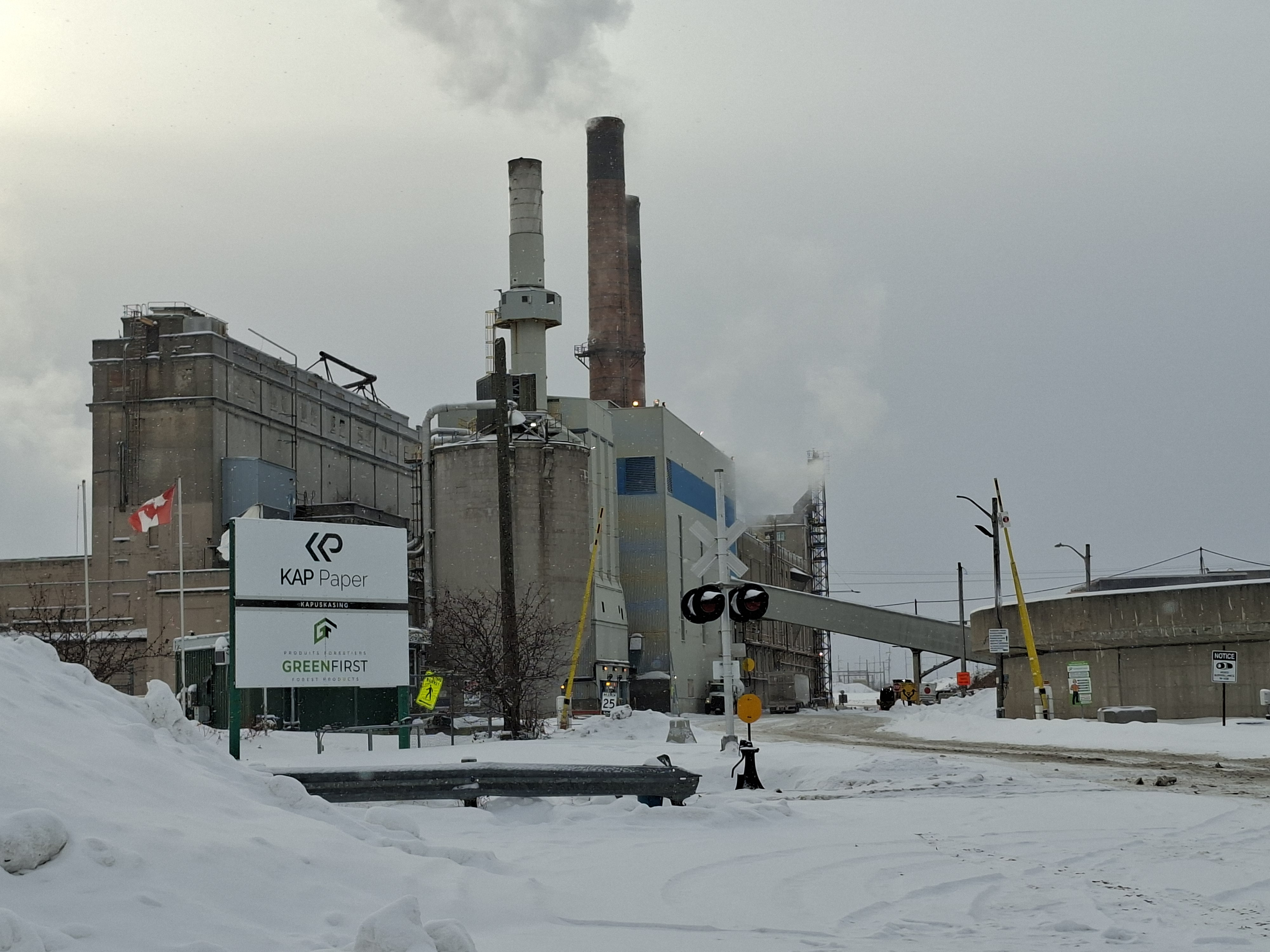
Kapuskasing Mill in December 2025

== Government ==
Kapuskasing has a federal representative known as a Member of Parliament, or MP, and a provincial representative known as a Member of Provincial Parliament, or MPP. Gaétan Malette of the Conservative Party of Canada is the area's MP and represents the federal riding of Kapuskasing—Timmins—Mushkegowuk. Guy Bourgouin, member of Ontario's New Democratic Party, is the town's MPP and represents the provincial Mushkegowuk—James Bay riding.

Locally the town is led by Mayor David Plourde. The mayor works with six councillors to complete Kapuskasing's municipal government. Local officials are all elected through universal elections, meaning the town is not divided into wards.

== Transportation ==
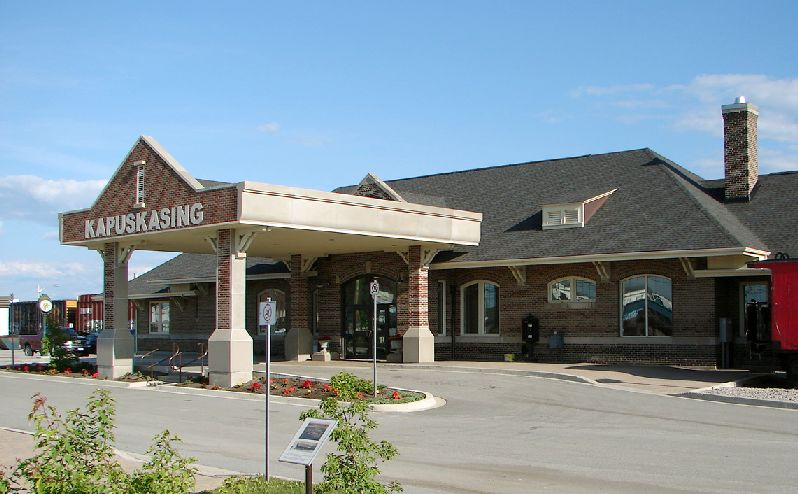
Train station, now also serving as the Economic Development Office and Tourism Bureau

Travellers reach Kapuskasing by car or Ontario Northland bus. There are no flights to Kapuskasing.

The town's pulp and paper mill is served by the Ontario Northland Railway, which took over the trackage serving the mill in 1994. The mill is located near the original National Transcontinental Railway mainline (NTR) that was later nationalized as part of the Canadian National Railway. The railway line crossed the Kapuskasing River in 1913 and was the main means of transportation accessing the town until the late 1950s and the early 1960s, when Highway 11 became the main route to the city.

Kapuskasing Airport was once a refuelling stop for Trans-Canada Air Lines flights in the days before jet airliners. It no longer has scheduled flights. The closest airport that does have scheduled commercial flights is Timmins Victor M. Power Airport, which is about 170 kilometres (110 mi) by road from Kapuskasing.

== Public services ==
=== Health ===
Sensenbrenner Hospital was built in 1927–1929 by the Spruce Falls Pulp & Paper Company for its workers. At the time the hospital was one of northern Ontario's finest. In 1988, the need for a more modern facility arose and the ultra-modern 53 bed complex was built in a different part of the town. Sensenbrenner serves a regional population of 14,000 residents. The hospital provides both in-patient and out-patient care. Clinical services include; emergency services, chronic cardiorespiratory, acute neurology, specialty clinics, general medicine, surgery, anaesthesia, obstetrics, pediatrics, chronic and long-term care, rehabilitation, and other related diagnostic and treatment services. The health care services are assessment, evaluation, screening, treatment programs and direct therapy. In 1995, the hospital built a private clinic wing near the Emergency Room.

EMS services are provided by Sensenbrenner Hospital, which is managed by the Northeastern Ontario Medical Education Corporation (NOMEC).

The Porcupine Health unit serves the town with preventive education, psychiatric services, social services and child social service.

=== Safety ===
The town operates a fire department which is a member of the Fire Marshalls of Ontario, Public Fire Safety Council.

A local branch of the Ontario Provincial Police is located at the site of the old Kapuskasing Inn.

Kapuskasing has Enhanced 911 (E911) service for Fire, Ambulance and Police.

== Education ==
Public

- District School Board Ontario North East (DSBONE):
  - Diamond Jubilee Public School (JK-8)
  - Kapuskasing District High School (9–12)
  - Eastview Public School (Closed)
- Conseil scolaire de district du Nord-Est de l'Ontario (CSDNE):
  - École publique Coeur du Nord (M-8)
  - École secondaire publique l'Écho du Nord (9–12)
  - Centre d’apprentissage du Nord-Est de l’Ontario (9–12)

Separate

- Northeastern Catholic District School Board (NCDSB):
  - St Patrick School (JK-8, JK-8 French Immersion), established in 1960.
- Conseil scolaire catholique de district des Grandes-Rivières (CSCDGR):
  - École élémentaire Jacques-Cartier (M-6)
  - École élémentaire Jeanne-Mance (Closed)
  - École élémentaire André Cary (M-6)
  - École Sacré-Coeur (Closed)
  - École secondaire catholique Cité des Jeunes (7–12)

Other

- Centre d'éducation Alternative High School (Adult Education)
- Collège Boréal à Kapuskasing (Post Secondary)
- Université de Hearst à Kapuskasing (Post Secondary)
- D'Youville Academy (Religious, Closed)

== Media ==
Kapuskasing's locally originated media include English-language commercial radio station CKAP (branded as Moose FM), French-language community radio station CKGN, and the English-language Kapuskasing Northern Times and bilingual Le/The Weekender community newspapers and the French newspaper L'Horizon. Le Nord, a French newspaper from Hearst, is also available in Kapuskasing. English-language daily newspaper the Timmins Daily Press offers minimal coverage through its regional reporting of the Cochrane District. The community receives its only aerial television coverage from CITO-TV-1 channel 10, a repeater of CTV outlet CITO-TV Timmins.

=== Radio ===
Frequency	Call sign	Branding	Format	Owner	Notes
FM 88.5	CJTK-FM-12	KFM	Christian music	Harvest Ministries Sudbury	Rebroadcaster of CJTK-FM Sudbury
FM 89.7	CKGN-FM		Franco-Ontarian community	Radio Communautaire KapNord	
FM 90.7	CBON-FM-24	Ici Radio-Canada Première	public news/talk	Canadian Broadcasting Corporation	French, rebroadcasts CBON-FM Sudbury
FM 92.3	CHIM-FM-10		Christian music	Roger de Brabant(1158556 Ontario Ltd.)	(Defunct) Rebroadcater of CHIM-FM Timmins. Station left the air in 2012.
FM 93.7	CHYX-FM	Le Loup	Francophone hot adult contemporary	Le5 Communications	(Defunct) The station left the air in 2016. Rebroadcaster of CHYK-FM (Timmins)
FM 100.9	CKAP-FM	Moose FM	Adult contemporary	Vista Broadcast Group	
FM 105.1	CBOK-FM	CBC Radio One	public news/talk	Canadian Broadcasting Corporation	rebroadcasts CBCS-FM Sudbury

=== Television ===
OTA channel	Call sign	Network	Notes
10 (VHF)	CITO-TV-1	CTV	Rebroadcaster of CITO-TV (Timmins); de fact rebroadcaster of CICI-TV (Sudbury)

== Notable people ==
- Shera Bechard, model and Playboy Playmate
- Maxime Boudreault, World's Strongest Man competitor
- James Cameron, motion picture director
- Roy Dupuis, actor
- Paul Lefebvre, politician
- Heather Mallick, author and columnist for the Toronto Star
- Kirk McCaskill, retired pitcher, Major League Baseball
- Shane Peacock, writer
- David Thompson, singer
- Kelly Vanderbeek, alpine ski racer

== In popular culture ==
Kapuskasing is mentioned in the 1994 children’s book Where is Gah-Ning, by Robert Munsch. In the story, a young Chinese-Canadian girl wants to visit Kapuskasing, but her father says no. She tries to go by bicycle and later on roller blades; she finally succeeds in getting there by floating on 300 helium balloons. It is also featured in Tomson Highway's award-winning play Dry Lips Oughta Move to Kapuskasing. In Season 12 of Degrassi, junior pro hockey player Campbell Saunders comes from Kapuskasing.

The protagonist of Alice Munro's story "Train" (2012), set in the early 1960s, is hopeful when he heads for Kapuskasing: "Work there, sure to be work in a lumbering town".

Canadian singer-songwriter Justin Rutledge has a song called "Kapuskasing Coffee" on his album Valleyheart. The album won the Juno Award for Roots & Traditional Album of the Year - Solo in 2014.

== See also ==
- List of francophone communities in Ontario
