= CFCL-TV =

Television station in Ontario, Canada (1956–2002)

Timmins, Ontario; Canada
- Channels: Analog: 6 (VHF); also heard on 87.7 MHz on the FM broadcast band
- Branding: MCTV CBC

Programming
- Affiliations: CBC, Radio-Canada

Ownership
- Owner: J. Conrad Lavigne (1956–1980); Mid-Canada Communications (1980–1990); Baton Broadcasting/CTV Inc. (1990–2002)
- Sister stations: CITO-TV

History
- First air date: June 21, 1956
- Last air date: October 27, 2002
- Call sign meaning: Conrad Lavigne (original owner)

Technical information
- ERP: 100 kW
- HAAT: 174.6 m (573 ft)
- Transmitter coordinates: 48°32′49″N 80°57′9″W
- Translator(s): see § Translators

CFCL-TV (channel 6) was a television station in Timmins, Ontario, Canada. The station was in operation from 1956 to 2002 as a private affiliate of CBC Television, and then continued until 2012 as a network-owned rebroadcaster of CBLT in Toronto.

== History ==
The station was established on June 21, 1956, by J. Conrad Lavigne. It was originally established as a bilingual private affiliate of the Canadian Broadcasting Corporation's English and French television networks. It aired on channel 6.

The station added a rebroadcast transmitter in Kapuskasing in 1957. Lavigne subsequently added rebroadcasters in several communities in Northern Ontario and Western Quebec; by 1965, CFCL had the largest privately owned microwave transmission network in the world. CFCL remained a dual affiliate until the mid-1960s, when CBOFT added a transmitter in Timmins, CBFOT (later becoming CBLFT-3).

In 1971, Lavigne opened new CBC stations in Sudbury (CKNC) and North Bay (CHNB). The existing CBC stations in those cities became CTV affiliates; their owner also extended its Sudbury signal to Timmins via transmitter CKSO-TV-2, later standalone station CITO.

Until 1980, CFCL and CKSO-2 aggressively competed with each other for advertising dollars, leaving both in a precarious financial position due to the Timmins market's relatively small size. In 1980, the Canadian Radio-television and Telecommunications Commission approved the merger of the two stations, along with their co-owned stations in North Bay and Sudbury, into the MCTV twinstick.

In 1990, the MCTV stations were acquired by Baton Broadcasting, which became the sole corporate owner of CTV in 1997.

=== End of operations ===
CTV subsequently sold its four CBC affiliates in Northern Ontario—CFCL, CHNB in North Bay, CJIC in Sault Ste. Marie and CKNC in Sudbury—directly to the CBC in 2002. All four ceased to exist as separate stations on October 27, 2002, becoming rebroadcasters of Toronto's CBLT, with CFCL's call sign changing to CBLT-7. These transmitters would close on July 31, 2012, due to budget cuts affecting the CBC.

== Transmitters ==
Station	City of licence	Channel	ERP	HAAT	Transmitter coordinates	Notes
CFCL-TV-2	Kearns	2 (VHF)	70 kW	212.4 m	48°8′7″N 79°33′18″W	later CBLT-8; also served Rouyn-Noranda, Quebec
CFCL-TV-3	Kapuskasing	2 (VHF)	4.6 kW	121.1 m	49°23′28″N 82°21′27″W	later CBLT-9
CBCC-TV	Hearst	5 (VHF)	8.11 kW	146.6 m	49°38′50″N 83°30′50″W	
CBCO-TV-1	Moosonee	9 (VHF)	0.009 kW	NA	51°17′2″N 80°38′4″W	
CBCU-TV	Chapleau	7 (VHF)	3.996 kW	128 m	47°51′15″N 83°25′8″W	
