= Television system =

Canadian term for group of television stations not defined as a network

In Canada, a television system is a group of television stations which share common ownership, branding and programming, but which for some reason does not satisfy the criteria necessary for it to be classified as a television network under Canadian law. As the term "television system" has no legal definition, and as most audiences and broadcasters usually refer to groups of stations with common branding and programming as "networks" regardless of their structure, the distinction between the two entities is often not entirely clear; indeed, the term is rarely discussed outside Canada's domestic broadcasting industry, along with its enthusiasts. In the latter regard, however, a group of Canadian stations is currently considered a "network" if it satisfies at least one of the following requirements:

- it operates under a network licence (either national or, in the case of Quebec where the majority of Canada's francophones reside, provincial) issued by the Canadian Radio-television and Telecommunications Commission (CRTC). Four such networks currently operate: CBC Television, Ici Radio-Canada Télé, TVA, and the Quebec provincial network Noovo. (The Aboriginal Peoples Television Network, APTN, was reclassified as a specialty channel by the CRTC in 2013, although it continues to operate broadcast transmitters in certain rural areas.)
- it has at least near-complete national over-the-air coverage (or equivalent mandatory cable carriage) in Canada's major population centres. Three additional station groups meet this criterion: CTV, the Global Television Network and Citytv.

If the group of stations does not match at least one of these criteria, it would then be classified as a "system".

In current practice, a television system may be either:

- a small group of stations with common branding, such as CTV 2 or Omni Television, or
- a regional group of stations within a larger network, such as CTV Atlantic, CTV Northern Ontario or CBC North, which are legally licensed as multiple stations but effectively act as a single station for programming, branding and advertising sales purposes.

Systems are differentiated from networks primarily by their less extensive service area – while a network will serve most Canadian broadcast markets in some form, a system will typically serve only a few markets. As well, a system may or may not offer some classes of programming, such as a national newscast, which are typically provided by a network.

Finally, with regard to "primary" systems, the amount of common programming on participating stations may be variable. While CTV Two (and previously City, the Baton Broadcast System (BBS) and Global) generally maintains programming and scheduling practices similar to networks (with variations required for specific stations licensed under educational or ethnic formats), the programming and scheduling of stations part of Omni and the Crossroads Television System often differs greatly between stations, with the system sometimes serving mainly as a common format and brand positioning, but providing limited common programming.

Television systems should not be confused with twinsticks, although some individual stations might be part of both types of operations simultaneously. Moreover, a single originating station serving multiple markets within the same province or region is neither a network nor a system; it is merely a station (although it might still be described as a system by its owner, as was the case with Toronto multicultural station CFMT-TV during the 1990s, prior to the formation of Omni Television). For example, independent station CHCH-DT in Hamilton has rebroadcasters in various parts of Ontario but broadcasts the same newscasts, entertainment programming and advertising, which target Hamilton and surrounding areas in the Golden Horseshoe region, across all of these transmitters province-wide.

A similar concept exists in Italy, the television circuit system, wherein various local broadcasters would receive programming from a single source. Notable examples include Euro TV, SuperSix, Junior TV, and Odeon.

== History ==
The term likely originated in the early 1990s when CanWest Global Communications, then a fledgling owner of independent stations that aired common programming, began using "CanWest Global System" (CGS) as a secondary brand for its various stations. Soon after, the Baton Broadcast System launched as a secondary "affiliation" linking another station group. In that sense, the term "system" was intended to give the impression of a full network service without any of the additional regulatory responsibilities, such as enhanced Canadian content requirements, that are associated with a CRTC-issued network licence. Much like today's systems, however, both CGS and BBS operated in relatively few markets compared to full "networks" such as CBC or CTV.

CGS was subsequently rebranded as the Global Television Network (adopting the brand that had been used by CIII in Paris since it launched in 1974, and maintaining a largely uniform programming schedule outside of news programming and certain substitutions for acquired programming), but never applied for a network licence from the CRTC. BBS's operations were eventually folded into CTV, which surrendered its own network licence in 2001. Indeed, as defined in Canada's Broadcasting Act, a "network" is an operation whereby the programming of a station is controlled by a different company. As both CTV and Global now own stations serving virtually every Canadian market, a national network licence would be redundant. Nevertheless, such "station groups" are now regulated in much the same way networks were regulated in the past.

Based on their national reach and the very limited differences in programming between stations, CTV and Global are both considered "networks" by the media and by the general public, notwithstanding the legal definition.

For a time, in the few markets where CTV does not own its own stations, programming was provided through a network licence that applied only to the applicable markets. Global, meanwhile, simply sublicenses its broadcast rights to local stations (as such, stations pay for programming, as opposed to the once-traditional North American model of networks paying stations).

The term can also be retroactively applied to American stations owned by groups that produced programming and had shared branding or appearances but were not networks, including Group W (which produced many programs at their stations, and often pre-empted programming from the networks their stations were affiliated with) and Metromedia (whose stations were mostly independent, and attempted a fourth network called "MetroNet" in the 1970s which never came to fruition); the former group became part of CBS in 1995, while the latter served as the foundation of the Fox Broadcasting Company in 1986.

== Current systems ==
=== Primary ===
- CTV 2
- Omni Television
- Yes TV
- indieNET

=== Regional network subsystems ===
- CBC North
- CTV Atlantic
- CTV Northern Ontario
- Great West Television

== Former systems ==
=== Defunct ===
- A-Channel (proposed under The Alberta Channel)
- Baton Broadcast System (successor to the Saskatchewan Television Network and Ontario Network Television)
- E! (formerly CH Television)
- Joytv
- Mid-Canada Television (MCTV)
- Northern Television
- Réseau Pathonic

=== "Upgraded" to networks ===
- Citytv
- Global Television Network (formerly Canwest Global System)
