= CBLT-DT =

Television station in Toronto

- Toronto, Ontario; Canada
- Channels: Digital: 20 (UHF); Virtual: 5
- Branding: CBC Toronto

Programming
- Affiliations: 5.1: CBC Television

Ownership
- Owner: Canadian Broadcasting Corporation
- Sister stations: CBLFT-DT, CBL-FM, CBLA-FM

History
- First air date: September 8, 1952
- Former call signs: CBLT (1952–2011)
- Former channel numbers: Analog: 9 (VHF, 1952–1956), 6 (VHF, 1956–1972), 5 (VHF, 1972–2011)
- Call sign meaning: CBC Great Lakes Television

Technical information
- Licensing authority: CRTC
- ERP: 106.9 kW
- HAAT: 491.0 m (1,611 ft)
- Transmitter coordinates: 43°38′33″N 79°23′14″W

Links
- Website: CBC Toronto

CBLT-DT (channel 5, cable channel 6) is a television station in Toronto, Ontario, Canada, serving as the flagship station of the English-language service of CBC Television. It is part of a twinstick with Ici Radio-Canada Télé outlet CBLFT-DT (channel 25). The two stations share studios at the Canadian Broadcasting Centre on Front Street West in downtown Toronto, which is also shared with national cable news channel CBC News Network and houses the studios for most of the CBC's news and entertainment programs. CBLT-DT's transmitter is located atop the CN Tower.

== History ==
CBC logo from 1940 to 1958.

The station conducted test broadcasts from August 15 to 22, 1952. CBLT began regular programming on September 8, 1952, originally broadcasting on VHF channel 9. It is the oldest television station in the province of Ontario, and the second oldest in Canada after Ici Radio-Canada Télé flagship station CBFT in Montreal. The station's first broadcast was prefaced by the inadvertent incorrect display of the CBC's national network logo; conflicting accounts say it was either displayed upside-down or backwards, due to the incorrect insertion of the slide. No such error was made two days earlier when CBFT signed on.

CBLT originally broadcast from a series of smaller studios with the main one on Mutual Street nicknamed unofficially as "The Barn" next to the transmitter tower (the old management building, nicknamed "The Kremlin", is now part of the National Ballet School on Jarvis Street). On January 19, 1953, a microwave link between Buffalo, New York and Toronto was activated, allowing the live telecast of programs from the American television networks. A few months later, on May 14, 1953, CBC Television's stations in Montreal (CBFT) and Ottawa (CBOT) became the first connections within the Trans-Canada Microwave system.

On August 27, 1956, CBLT moved to VHF channel 6 and increased its effective radiated power from 25 to 100 kW. The change in frequency was made to accommodate the eventual licensing of a second privately owned local station for Toronto, which eventually became CFTO (channel 9) when that station was licensed at the end of 1960. Then on September 11, 1972, CBLT relocated to channel 5 in order to allow two new stations – CKGN (now CIII-DT) in Paris and a repeater of Ottawa-based CJOH in Deseronto – to use channel 6.

CBLT moved its transmitter facilities to the CN Tower when it opened in 1976; its signal was transmitted from the tower for the first time on May 31, 1976. It moved its operations to the Canadian Broadcasting Centre on Front Street in 1992.

== Branding ==
Former logo used for local promotions and/or programs, used from 2015 to 2019

CBLT has used a variety of on-air brands since its inception. From 1957 to 1972, it was known as "Channel 6". Following its move to channel 5 in 1972, it rebranded as "CBLT Five", later simplifying it to "CBLT/5". In the late 1970s, the station was branded as "Toronto/5", with the then-new CBC logo substituting for one of the O's in "Toronto". During the 1980s, it was known mainly as CBLT-TV, although it used a "CBC 5" logo. Starting on January 1, 1986, the station was identified in print ads as "CBC Television Toronto/5", but the CBLT name was used for its local programs including its supper hour newscast CBLT Newshour. By the 1990s, it was known simply as "CBC Toronto", although the CBLT calls were used from time to time in local programming, and on the CBC website. As with most Canadian television stations, the use of the analog channel placement was phased out of the station's logo and advertising, as most cable placements did not match up with its VHF frequency.

== News operation ==
CBLT-DT currently broadcasts 10 hours, 40 minutes of locally produced newscasts each week (with two hours each weekday, a half-hour on Saturdays and ten minutes on Sundays); in regards to the number of hours devoted to news programming, it is the lowest local newscast output out of any English-language television station in the immediate Toronto market and the second lowest among the stations in the expanded Toronto–Hamilton–Barrie market as a whole (behind CTV 2 owned-and-operated station CKVR-DT, which airs seven hours of newscasts each week). CBLT's newscasts have consistently faced very stiff competition in the Toronto market, consistently rating behind CTV station CFTO since it surged to the number one spot in 1970, and behind CITY-TV (channel 57) since 1982.

On September 10, 1984, CBLT debuted one of the only locally produced morning television programs in Canada, CBLT Morning, which aired weekdays from 7 to 9 a.m. The program was co-hosted by Dale Goldhawk and Leslie Jones, with news reported by Kevin Marsh. At the time of the program's cancellation on April 4, 1986, it was watched by 20,000 viewers, more than the Canadian viewership of ABC's Good Morning America, but less than that of CTV's Canada AM.

In the spring of 1995, according to BBM Canada, CBLT's evening newscast CBC Evening News had a total audience of 117,000 viewers in the Toronto-Hamilton market, putting it in fourth place behind Global News on CIII at 141,000, CITY's CityPulse at 229,000, and CFTO's World Beat News at 409,000. Only CHCH (channel 11), the only other station based in the Toronto–Hamilton market with a 6 p.m. newscast, had lower viewership at 77,000 viewers.

On October 15, 2011, CBLT debuted a half-hour 6 p.m. newscast on Saturdays; the station then launched a ten-minute news bulletin on Sundays at 11 p.m. the following day. A 30-minute newscast at 11 p.m. on weeknights was introduced on September 17, 2012. The additional local newscasts were part of a five-year strategic plan by the CBC called "2015: Everyone, Every Way", which featured local service improvements across the CBC's television, radio and internet platforms.

=== Notable current on-air staff ===
- Dwight Drummond – weeknight anchor

=== Notable former on-air staff ===
- Guido Basso – music director (1963–1967)
- Hilary Brown – anchor of Newshour (1984–1991)
- Bill Cameron – news anchor (1992–1995)
- Sharon Dunn – anchor of Newshour and Newsfinal/host of Reach for the Top (1979–1984)
- Chris Glover – reporter (2010s–2025)
- Dale Goldhawk – co-host of CBLT Morning (1984–1986)
- Bill Harrington – legislative reporter
- Ross Hull – meteorologist (2013–2014)
- Fraser Kelly – co-host of Newshour (1981–1986)
- Jeffrey Kofman – anchor/reporter
- Claire Martin – weeknight meteorologist
- Anne-Marie Mediwake – weeknights anchor (2010–2016)
- Suhana Meharchand – news anchor (1995–2022)
- Steve Paikin – Queen's Park correspondent
- Percy Saltzman – CBLT's first weather person (1952–1972)
- Alex Trebek – news anchor/host of Reach for the Top (1962–1974)
- Adam Vaughan – reporter (1994–2000)

== Technical information ==
=== Subchannel ===
Subchannel of CBLT-DT
Subchannel	Res.	Short name	Programming
5.1	720p	CBLT-DT	CBC Television

=== Analog-to-digital conversion ===
On January 30, 2004, the Canadian Radio-television and Telecommunications Commission (CRTC) granted CBLT permission to broadcast a digital signal on UHF channel 20; CBLT's began broadcasting programming in high definition on March 5, 2005.

CBLT shut down its analog signal, over VHF channel 5, on August 31, 2011, the official date on which Canadian television stations in CRTC-designated mandatory markets transitioned from analog to digital broadcasts. The station's digital signal remained on its pre-transition UHF channel 20, using virtual channel 5.

=== Coverage ===
The station's signal from its CN Tower transmitter adequately covers the immediate Greater Toronto Area, from Oshawa in the east, out to Halton Hills and Georgetown in the west, and from Hamilton and Niagara Falls in the south, to roughly Bradford.

In addition, CBLT serves as the default CBC Television station for cable and satellite subscribers in markets previously served over-the-air by CBLT's rebroadcast transmitters (see below), as well as the Thunder Bay and Peterborough television markets, after CKPR-DT in Thunder Bay disaffiliated from the network September 1, 2014, and CHEX-DT in Peterborough and its sister station CHEX-TV-2 in Oshawa both followed August 31, 2015, in both cases to become affiliates of the CTV Television Network.

The station is also carried on cable in several American communities, similar to sister stations CBUT in Vancouver, CBET in Windsor and CBMT in Montreal.

=== Former transmitters ===
CBLT served much of Ontario through a network of over 35 rebroadcast transmitters, including all of Northeastern Ontario and most of Southwestern Ontario, with the exception of Windsor since CBET-DT serves the Windsor area. The station only served Southern Ontario and a few rural Northern Ontario communities until 2002, when it took over the CBC affiliates of the MCTV twinstick. CBLGT in Geraldton and the CBLAT transmitters had operated since the early 1970s, while others were added as other CBC affiliates disaffiliated from the network or were bought by the CBC.

On August 16, 2011, the CRTC granted the CBC permission to continue operating 22 analog repeaters within mandatory markets, including those in London and Kitchener. These analog transmitters were given an extension until August 31, 2012, to continue in operation, by which time the transmitters had to be converted to digital or shut down. The CBC did not seek an extension for its Barrie transmitter, which it shut down on August 31, 2011; however, the remaining satellite rebroadcast stations remained in operation.

Reportedly due to federal funding reductions to the CBC in April 2012, the CBC made substantial cuts to their transmitting budget, including shutting down the CBC's and Radio-Canada's remaining analog transmitters on July 31, 2012. This included shutting down all the remaining CBC and Radio-Canada's rebroadcasters that had been "held over" using analog transmitters during 2011–12. All of them have been decommissioned by the CBC, leaving rural Canadians and U.S. border regions with no free over-the-air CBC coverage, and those viewers have been instructed to subscribe to a cable or satellite provider or have been directed to the website available through pay internet providers.

==== Rebroadcasters of CBLT ====
City of licence	Call sign	Channel	ERP (W)	Notes
Attawapiskat	CBLET	12 (VHF)	10	Originally a repeater of CFCL-TV/Timmins until that station became a CBLT repeater in 2002.
Beardmore	CBLAT-5	9 (VHF)	8	
Chapleau	CBCU-TV	7 (VHF)	101	Originally a repeater of CFCL-TV/Timmins until that station became a CBLT repeater in 2002.
Elliot Lake	CBEC-TV	7 (VHF)	34,000	Formerly CKNC-TV-1; originally a repeater of CKNC-TV/Sudbury until that station became a CBLT repeater in 2002.
Fort Albany	CBLDT	8 (VHF)	491	Originally a repeater of CFCL-TV/Timmins until that station became a CBLT repeater in 2002.
Fort Hope	CBLHT	12 (VHF)	10	This transmitter once repeated CBC North through CBNT of St. John's, NL
Fraserdale	CBLCT	7 (VHF)	10	Originally a repeater of CFCL-TV/Timmins until that station became a CBLT repeater in 2002.
Geraldton	CBLGT	13 (VHF)	22,000	Formerly CBLAT
Hearst	CBCC-TV	5 (VHF)	5,300	Originally a repeater of CFCL-TV/Timmins until that station became a CBLT repeater in 2002.
Hornepayne	CBLAT-6	13 (VHF)	30,000	
Huntsville	CBLT-TV-2	8 (VHF)	115	Formerly CKVR-TV-2, originally repeated present-day CTV 2 affiliate CKVR-TV/Barrie
Kapuskasing	CBLT-9	2 (VHF)	17	Originally a repeater of CFCL-TV/Timmins until that station became a CBLT repeater in 2002.
Kearns	CBLT-8	2 (VHF)	70,000	Also served Rouyn-Noranda, Quebec in lieu of CBMT Montreal; originally a repeater of CFCL-TV/Timmins until that station became a CBLT repeater in 2002.
Little Current	CBCE-TV	16 (UHF)	23,700	
Manitouwadge	CBLAT-1	8 (VHF)	22,000	
Marathon	CBLAT-4	11 (VHF)	7,500	
Moosonee	CBCO-TV-1	9 (VHF)	9	Originally a repeater of CFCL-TV/Timmins until that station became a CBLT repeater in 2002.
Nipigon	CBLK-TV	16 (UHF)	2,300	Originally a CBC-owned repeater of CBC private affiliate CKPR-TV/Thunder Bay (currently a CTV affiliate)
North Bay	CBLT-4	4 (VHF)	100	Operated as CHNB-TV, a separate station from 1955 to 1970, then it became part of the MCTV-CBC regional network from 1970 until the CBC's acquisition in 2002.
Parry Sound	CBLT-TV-3	18 (UHF)	50	The CBLT repeater was launched on channel 18 on September 1, 1995 the same day CKVR/Barrie disaffiliated from the CBC and kept its channel 12 repeater at Parry Sound as an independent station.
Sault Ste. Marie	CBLT-5	5 (VHF)	37,900	Operated as CJIC-TV, a separate station from 1955 to 1970, then it became part of the MCTV-CBC regional network from 1970 until the CBC's acquisition in 2002. This repeater also provided analog service to the easternmost portions of Michigan's Upper Peninsula in the United States.
Sudbury	CBLT-6	9 (VHF)	115,500	Operated as CKNC-TV, a part of the MCTV-CBC regional network from 1971 until the CBC's acquisition in 2002.
Timmins	CBLT-7	6 (VHF)	100,000	Operated as CFCL-TV, a separate station from 1956 to 1970, then it became part of the MCTV-CBC regional network from 1970 until the CBC's acquisition in early 2002.
Wawa	CBLAT-3	9 (VHF)	16,000	
White River	CBLAT-2	12 (VHF)	304	

==== Rebroadcasters of CBLN-TV ====
The following is a list of transmitters that originally rebroadcast London, Ontario-based CBC outlet CBLN-TV. CBLN-TV first signed on in 1988 as a CBC outlet for southwestern Ontario outside of Windsor, broadcasting on UHF channel 40, replacing CFPL-TV as an affiliate. CBLN-TV carried local advertising and very few programming variations, but otherwise produced no programming of its own and was a de facto rebroadcaster of CBLT.

City of licence	Call sign	UHF Channel	Notes
Chatham	CBLN-TV-3	64	
London	CBLN-TV	23	Began operation in 1988; formerly on channel 40
Normandale	CBLN-TV-6	44	
Paris/Kitchener/Waterloo	CBLN-TV-1	29	Formerly on UHF channel 56
Sarnia/Oil Springs (Port Huron, Michigan)	CBLN-TV-2	34	
Wiarton	CBLN-TV-5	20	
Wingham	CBLN-TV-4	45	Replaced CKNX-TV as a CBC affiliate

== See also ==
- CBLFT-DT
- List of CBC television stations
