= CHNB-TV =

Television station in North Bay, Ontario (1971–2002)

- North Bay, Ontario; Canada
- Channels: Analog: 4 (VHF)
- Branding: MCTV CBC

Programming
- Affiliations: CBC

Ownership
- Owner: J. Conrad Lavigne (1971–1980); Mid-Canada Communications (1980–1990); Baton Broadcasting/CTV Inc. (1990–2002)
- Sister stations: CKNY-TV

History
- First air date: October 15, 1971
- Last air date: October 27, 2002

Technical information
- ERP: 100 kW
- HAAT: 223.1 m (732 ft)
- Transmitter coordinates: 46°3′46″N 79°26′7″W

CHNB-TV (channel 4) was a television station in North Bay, Ontario, Canada. The station was in operation from 1971 to 2002 as a private affiliate of CBC Television, and then continued until 2012 as a network-owned rebroadcaster of CBLT in Toronto.

== History ==
CHNB was established on October 15, 1971, by J. Conrad Lavigne, the owner of CFCL in Timmins. On the same day, the existing television station in North Bay, CKNY, switched affiliation to CTV.

Until 1980, CHNB and CKNY aggressively competed with each other for advertising revenues, leaving both in a precarious financial position due to the North Bay market's relatively small size. In 1980, the Canadian Radio-television and Telecommunications Commission approved the merger of the two stations, and with their co-owned stations in Sudbury and Timmins, into the MCTV twinstick.

In 1990, the MCTV stations were acquired by Baton Broadcasting, which became the sole corporate owner of CTV in 1997.

=== Transmitters ===
On April 13, 1978, the CBC was given approval to add a television transmitter at Témiscaming, Quebec, on channel 21 with an ERP of 75 watts to rebroadcast the programs of CHNB-TV.

=== End of operations ===
CTV subsequently sold its four CBC affiliates in Northern Ontario—CHNB, CJIC in Sault Ste. Marie, CKNC in Sudbury and CFCL in Timmins—directly to the CBC in 2002. All four ceased to exist as separate stations on October 27, 2002, becoming rebroadcasters of Toronto's CBLT, with CHNB's call sign changing to CBLT-4. These transmitters would close on July 31, 2012, due to budget cuts affecting the CBC.

Since 2013, the CHNB callsign currently belongs to a Global Television Network station in Saint John, New Brunswick, known as CHNB-DT.
