= CJIC-TV =

Television station in Sault Ste. Marie, Ontario (1954–2002)

Sault Ste. Marie, Ontario; Canada
- Channels: Analog: 5 (VHF)
- Branding: MCTV CBC

Programming
- Affiliations: CBC

Ownership
- Owner: Hyland Broadcasting (1955–1976); Huron Broadcasting (1976–1990); Baton Broadcasting/CTV Inc. (1990–2002)
- Sister stations: CHBX-TV

History
- First air date: November 28, 1954
- Last air date: October 27, 2002
- Former channel numbers: 2 (VHF, 1954–1978)

Technical information
- ERP: 75.7 kW
- HAAT: 182.9 m (600 ft)
- Transmitter coordinates: 46°35′42″N 84°21′3″W

CJIC-TV (channel 5) was a television station in Sault Ste. Marie, Ontario, Canada. The station was in operation from 1954 to 2002 as a private affiliate of CBC Television, and then continued until 2012 as a network-owned rebroadcaster of CBLT in Toronto.

== History ==
CJIC began broadcasting on channel 2 on November 28, 1954, owned by Hyland Broadcasting along with CJIC radio (1490 AM, later CFYN at 1500 AM, 1050 AM and now defunct). Hyland introduced television to the Sault, first with kinescopes and live programming. Later, the microwave brought the live CBC network feed, then colour on the network, and finally to the studio, along with video tape that greatly enhanced production. CJIC also introduced television to the eastern part of Michigan's Upper Peninsula in the United States; the American television networks did not arrive there until WPBN-TV, the NBC affiliate in Traverse City, signed on a satellite station in 1959 (WTOM) to bring its programming to the Upper Peninsula.

In 1976, Hyland merged with Algonquin Broadcasting, owner of the other radio stations on the Canadian side of the locks, to form Huron Broadcasting. Soon after taking control, Huron established a twinstick station, CKCY, affiliated with the CTV Television Network. CKCY adopted the new callsign CHBX-TV in 1988. CJIC moved to channel 5 when CKCY signed on, taking over channel 2. The move of CJIC to channel 5 caused much interference for viewers trying to tune in WNEM-TV from Bay City, Michigan, which was seen on area cable systems on cable channel 5.

=== Merger into MCTV ===
In 1990, Baton Broadcasting acquired both Huron Broadcasting and the MCTV twinstick in Sudbury, North Bay and Timmins. Following the purchases, CJIC and CHBX were merged into the MCTV system. Baton Broadcasting became the sole corporate owner of CTV in 1997.

=== End of operations ===
CTV subsequently sold its four CBC affiliates in Northern Ontario—CJIC, CHNB-TV in North Bay, CKNC-TV in Sudbury and CFCL-TV in Timmins—directly to the CBC in 2002. All four ceased to exist as separate stations on October 27, 2002, becoming rebroadcasters of Toronto's CBLT, with CJIC's call sign changing to CBLT-5. These transmitters would close on July 31, 2012, due to budget cuts affecting the CBC.
