= CKNY-DT =

Television station in North Bay, Ontario

- North Bay, Ontario; Canada
- Channels: Digital: 12 (VHF); Virtual: 10
- Branding: CTV Northern Ontario (general); CTV News Northern Ontario (newscasts)

Programming
- Network: CTV Northern Ontario
- Affiliations: CTV

Ownership
- Owner: Bell Media Inc.

History
- First air date: December 19, 1955
- Former call signs: CKGN-TV (1955–1960); CFCH-TV (1960–1970); CKNY-TV (1970–2020)
- Former channel numbers: Analog: 10 (VHF, 1955–2020)
- Former affiliations: CBC Television (1955–1971)

Technical information
- Licensing authority: CRTC
- ERP: 28 kW
- HAAT: 192 m (630 ft)
- Transmitter coordinates: 46°3′47″N 79°26′7″W

Links
- Website: CTV Northern Ontario

CKNY-DT (channel 10) is a television station in North Bay, Ontario, Canada, owned and operated by the CTV Television Network, a division of Bell Media. The station maintains a transmitter adjacent to Ski Hill Road (southwest of Highway 534) in Nipissing.

CKNY-DT is part of the CTV Northern Ontario sub-system, and is the only station in the sub-system to broadcast a digital signal. It essentially operates as a de facto semi-satellite of CICI-TV in Sudbury, running the same programming as that station at all times (except for certain commercials and regional news inserts during its newscasts). CKNY-TV's studios were located on Oak and Wyld Streets (near the shoreline of Lake Nipissing) in downtown North Bay, and were closed in 2020.

== History ==
CKNY was originally launched by local businessmen Gerry Alger and Gerry Stanton in 1955, as a CBC affiliate with the callsign CKGN. The station was subsequently acquired by The Thomson Corporation in 1960, and recalled as CFCH.

In 1970, Thomson reached a deal to sell the station to Bushnell Communications of Ottawa, although the transaction was never completed. Around the same time, the Canadian Radio-television and Telecommunications Commission (CRTC) rejected all of the applicants in the first round of license hearings to extend CTV service to Sudbury, the largest market in the region; because the North Bay and Timmins markets were deemed too small to support competing television stations, the commission directed Cambrian Broadcasting of Sudbury and J. Conrad Lavigne of Timmins to collaborate on an alternative plan in which all three cities would receive CTV service without losing CBC. Effectively, the decision declared all three cities to be a single television market, and prevented new television companies from entering and potentially upsetting the balance.

In the first revised plan, Cambrian's CKSO-TV, which was now slated to become the CTV affiliate, would simply have added a rebroadcaster in North Bay on channel 4, while leaving the ownership status and affiliation of CFCH unchanged. The CRTC rejected this proposal, however, as it did not adequately resolve the commission's concerns about CFCH's financial viability in the face of competition. Accordingly, in 1971 the station, by then recalled as CKNY, was directly acquired by Cambrian Broadcasting and became an affiliate of CTV and a semi-satellite of CKSO, while Lavigne's new CBC affiliate, CHNB, went on the air at the same time.

For a number of years in the 1960s and '70s, CFCH/CKNY operated rebroadcast transmitter CJTK-TV in Témiscaming, Quebec on channel 3. It is not known when it was shut down.

Throughout the 1970s, CKNY and CHNB aggressively competed with each other for advertising revenue; by 1980, however, the stations ran into exactly the problem the CRTC had been trying to prevent by linking them to Sudbury in the 1970 hearings: they were losing money and very nearly bankrupt. In 1980, the CRTC approved the merger of the two stations, along with their co-owned stations in Sudbury and Timmins, into the MCTV twinstick.

An MCTV logo with its CKNY call sign from the 1980's. Less frequently, versions of this logo were sometimes seen over the Mid-Canada Television stations which included both the call sign and the MCTV branding.

In 1990, the stations were acquired by Baton Broadcasting. Baton subsequently became the sole corporate owner of CTV, and sold CHNB to the CBC in 2002.

In 1999, CKNY began rebroadcasting on channel 11 in Huntsville, Ontario (CKNY-TV-11), licensed to Dwight and serving the Muskoka and Parry Sound area on a transmitter which previously rebroadcast the programming of CKCO (as CKCO-TV-4). Initially a semi-satellite with a very small amount of local programming, the Huntsville station subsequently lost local programming, and then changed its programming and advertising feed source to CICI.

Since the acquisition of CTV by Bell Canada, CKNY has gradually downsized its local operations, with all newscasts across the CTV Northern Ontario system (formerly MCTV) centralized out of Sudbury; as of 2020, the station only had three local employees (two reporters and a cameraman). In May 2020, CKNY closed its local studio on Oak Street, with the remaining employees now working remotely.

Just after midnight on October 30, 2020, CKNY-TV turned off its analog signal and signed on its digital signal on channel 12.
