= List of defunct radio stations in Canada =

This is a list of defunct radio stations in Canada. Note: These stations have ceased operations. Stations which have changed frequencies, such as moving from the AM to the FM band, are not listed.

Call sign	City of License	Frequency	Notes
== Alberta ==
CKMX	Calgary	1060 AM	Ceased operations on June 14, 2023
CFFR	Calgary	660 AM	Ceased operations on July 7, 2026
CFAC	Calgary	960 AM	Ceased operations on July 7, 2026
CFRN	Edmonton	1260 AM	Ceased operations on June 14, 2023
CHIM-FM-5	Red Deer	93.1 FM	2000–2012. Semi-repeater of CHIM-FM Timmins, Ontario; license revoked due to regulatory non-compliance of originating station in 2012.
CJMH	Medicine Hat	1460 AM	Formerly owned by Monarch Broadcasting Ltd., an affiliate with the CBC, the station ceased operation in the 1990s and was replaced by an FM repeater for CBC-owned CBR Calgary.
== British Columbia ==
CFCH-FM	Chase	103.5 FM	Licence revoked in 2014.
CIFJ	Fort St. James	1480 AM	Former simulcast of CIVH Vanderhoof
CIFL	Fraser Lake	1450 AM	Former simulcast of CIVH Vanderhoof
CHLD	Granisle	1480 AM	Former simulcast of CFBV Smithers
CKBV	New Hazelton	1490 AM	Former simulcast of CFBV Smithers
CKPM-FM	Port Moody	98.7 FM	On February 28, 2020, the CRTC denied renewal to CKPM's license after March 30, 2020
CHOO-FM	Tofino	101.7 FM	
CIMA	Vancouver	1040 AM	1986–1992. CKST would move to 1040 after its owners acquired CIMA. CIMA closed in February 1992, with CKST relocating from 800 to 1040 the following month. Its old 800 frequency remains vacant.
CKST	Vancouver	1040 AM	Ceased operations on June 14, 2023
CFTE	Vancouver	1410 AM	Ceased operations on June 14, 2023
CKWX	Vancouver	1130 AM	Ceased operations on July 7, 2026
CISL (AM)	Vancouver	650 AM	Ceased operations on July 7, 2026
CHCE	Victoria	750 AM	
CKMO	Victoria	900 AM	1993–2012. Continuing as an internet radio station.
== Manitoba ==
CFRW	Winnipeg	1290 AM	Ceased operations on June 14, 2023
CJWV-FM	Winnipeg	107.9 FM	
CKIC-FM	Winnipeg	92.9 FM	2004-2012. Closed due to new regulations prohibiting students from being employed as DJs. Continuing as an internet radio station.
== New Brunswick ==
CIRC-FM	Fredericton	93.3 FM	2004–2010. Continuing as an internet radio station.
CHLR	Moncton	1380 AM	1981–85. CHLR went dark on Jan. 2, 1985 due to bankruptcy.
CKCX	Sackville	9625 kHz	Station operated on shortwave. Left the air in 2012.
CJRP-FM	Saint John	103.5 FM	2003–2013. CJRP-FM went dark on April 19, 2013, due to continual monetary losses.
== Nova Scotia ==
CFSM	Halifax	550 AM	A closed circuit AM radio station which served Saint Mary's University in Halifax from 1966 to 1998. In 1982, CFSM moved from 660 kHz to 550 kHz.
CJNI-FM	Halifax	95.7 FM	Ceased operations on July 7, 2026
CKBG-FM	Middle Musquodoboit	107.3 FM	2010–2012. Closed by owner due to economic troubles.
== Ontario ==
CFAO-FM	Alliston	94.7 FM	Bankruptcy in 2010.
CKOA	Arnprior	1490 AM	Superseded by FM conversion of sister station CHVR.
CFAK	Atikokan		
CHRA-FM	Aurora	101.5 FM	The CRTC approved the Voice of Aurora Community Radio's application to operate an FM community radio station in 2016. The group applied for a one-year extension in March 2018 to get the CHRA-FM on the air. The revised construction permit expired in 2019 and the station was never launched. Future plans to reapply and launch the station are uncertain.
CJNR	Blind River	730 AM	Superseded by FM conversion of sister station CKNR.
CKPC	Brantford	1380 AM	Station left the air in 2023.
CIBI-FM	Britt	102.5 FM	In 2003, the Canadian Broadcasting Corporation (CBC), on behalf of the Department of the Environment received approval by the CRTC to operate a new low-power FM radio station which would provide weather and environmental information. Its unknown if the station was ever launched.
CIIB-FM	Brockville	94.5 FM	Was a tourist information station owned by Instant Information Services
CFGM-FM	Caledon	105.5 FM	
CFYI	Caledon East	790 AM	Was a 30 watt tourist information station
CKML	Chalk River	530 AM	
CFIX	Cornwall	1170 AM	1959–83. CFIX went dark in Dec. 1983 due to technical and financial problems.
CJUL	Cornwall	1220 AM	
CIRG-FM	Cornwall	107.7 FM	Was a tourist information station owned by Instant Information Services
CJIV-FM	Dryden	97.3 FM	Was a Christian radio station that operated from 2003 to 2013. Station left the air on August 31, 2013, due to lack of support.
CFCD-FM	Dryden	98.5 FM	Approved to operate in 2002 Licence revoked in 2013.
CKEF	Ear Falls	1450 AM	See CKDR-FM Dryden.
CKNS	Espanola	930 AM	Superseded by FM conversion of sister station CKNR.
CBLP	Espanola	1240 AM	A low-power 40 watt AM transmitter that signed on the air as a local community radio station in September 1971 by the Espanola Community Radio Citizens Committee with some CBC programming but is uncertain of when it left the air. A CBC rebroadcaster CBCE-FM in Little Current signed on in the 1980s to cover Manitoulin Island, areas of the north shore and Espanola replacing the AM signal.
CFHS	Fort Frances	530 AM	Owned by Fawcett Broadcasting, CFHS's last licence renewal was in 1994. Its uncertain if the station is still broadcasting.
CKWO-FM	Fort Frances/ Couchiching	92.3 FM	Was a community radio station owned by Couchiching Community Radio that was launched in 2004. Its unknown when the station left the air; the CRTC renewed CKWO-FM's licence from September 1, 2012, to February 28, 2013, with no record of renewal from that date.
CKUC-FM	French River	102.7 FM	On May 21, 2014, the CRTC approved an application by Justin Godin to operate a low-power FM commercial radio station to serve French River offering a music format consisting of pop, rock and dance, country and easy listening music. The station was never launched.
CJCE-FM	Godfrey	93.7 FM	In 2002, Christian Youth Centre (Kingston) - Camp IAWAH received CRTC approval to operate a very low-power religious radio station at Camp IAWAH in the summer months at 106.3 MHz but was changed to 93.7 MHz. The station was branded as "The Juice". The last license renewal was from January 1, 2009, to August 31, 2015.
CHML	Hamilton	900 AM	The station ceased operations on August 14, 2024.
CKHD	Hudson		See CKDR-FM Dryden.
CKIG	Ignace		See CKDR-FM Dryden.
CISD-FM	Iroquois	107.7 FM	Was a community radio station owned by Seaway Campus Community Radio Ltd. that signed on the air around 1999 and left the air in 2003.
CJFL-FM	Iroquois Falls	104.7 FM	Station left the air in 2014.
CIRJ-FM	Kingston	106.3 FM	Was a tourist information station owned by Instant Information Services
CKGL	Kitchener	570 AM	Ceased operations on July 7, 2026
CJBK	London	1290 AM	Ceased operations on June 14, 2023
CKSL	London	1410 AM	The station left the air at midnight August 14, 2016.
CHAP	Longlac	1450 AM	Station left the air in 1977 CHAP (owned by Kenomadiwin Inc.) was a radio station, which lasted from 1970 to 1977 and also operated a number of stations in the following locations: CHAS Aroland, CHOP Gull Bay, CHEW Lake Helen, CHIP MacDairmid, and CHOX Pays Platt.
CFBN	Mississauga	1280 AM	
CJRN	Niagara Falls	710 AM	Station left the air in 2012.
CKTR-FM	North Bay	104.9 FM	
VEK565	Oakville	90.7 FM	
CIWW	Ottawa	1310 AM	Station left the air on October 26, 2023.
CHYW	Ottawa	1630 AM	A low-power tourist information radio station that operated from the Macdonald-Cartier International Airport which was approved by the CRTC to operate on 1630 kHz in 2001. Its uncertain when the station left the air.
CIIO-FM	Ottawa		Station used a variety of frequencies until it left the air in 2011.
CFPO-FM	Ottawa	95.7 FM	The station ceased operations on September 1, 2025.
CFDT-FM	Ottawa	96.5 FM	
CFDK-FM	Pickle Lake	98.5 FM	
CKRE	Red Lake	1340 AM	See CKDR-FM Dryden.
CFRI-FM	Red Lake	95.1 FM	JR Radio (OBCI) was approved in 2000 to operate a new community FM radio station at 95.1 MHz with 50 watts. JR Radio (OBCI) received approval for an extension of time limit to get the station on the air in 2001. Its uncertain if the station had ever launched or when it left the air. There's no known license renewals for CFRI-FM Red Lake.
CKOB	Renfrew	1400 AM	Superseded by FM conversion of sister station CHVR.
CFOT	Sarnia	1150 AM	An English-language low-power AM travellers radio station owned by Global Communications Limited. CFOT's Last licence renewal with the CRTC was in 1990.
CHSC	St. Catharines	1220 AM	License revoked in 2010 due to regulatory non-compliance. Remains active as an Internet radio service.
CIRS	Sault Ste. Marie	530 AM	Licensed by the CRTC in 1986; Last licence renewal was in 2004 and later left the air.
CFYN	Sault Ste. Marie	1050 AM	
CKCY	Sault Ste. Marie	920 AM	
CKSI	Sioux Lookout		See CKDR-FM Dryden.
CKBB-FM	Sudbury	102.9 FM	
CKSO-FM	Sudbury	101.1 FM	
CIQW-FM	Quinte West	99.3 FM	Forced off the air due to a nearby new radio station CJPE-FM in Prince Edward County
CJLX	Thunder Bay	800 AM	See CBQT-FM
CKOT	Tillsonburg	1510 AM	Ceased broadcasting on February 17, 2013, as Canada's last AM daytimer radio station; now continued as CJDL-FM.
CKTT-FM	Timmins	94.3 FM	A former tourist information station that was launched by 1311831 Ontario Limited in the early 2000s. The last license renewal was in 2007 to expire on August 31, 2014. It is unknown when the station left the air.
CHIM-FM	Timmins	102.3 FM	1996–2012. License revoked due to regulatory non-compliance in 2012. The Christian music format continues with a live stream on the internet at chimfm.com as well as a Broadcast Station on 1710 AM in Timmins.
CFCA	Toronto	770 AM	Owned and operated by the Toronto Daily Star from 1922 to 1933, was Toronto's first regularly broadcasting radio station and was the first radio station in the world to broadcast live play-by-play hockey coverage.
CHEV	Toronto	1610 AM	Dropped from an unprotected frequency in 2004; never submitted an application for a new frequency before its scheduled license renewal in 2010.
CKAV-FM	Toronto	106.5	License for flagship station of the Aboriginal Voices Radio network revoked in 2015 due to regulatory non-compliance. Toronto flagship terminated, rebroadcasters in Ottawa (CKAV-FM-9 95.7 MHz) and Kitchener (CKAV-FM-8 102.5 MHz) also defunct as well as Vancouver (CKAV-FM-2, 106.3 MHz), Calgary (CKAV-FM-3 88.1 MHz), Edmonton (CKAV-FM-4 89.3 MHz), and Montreal (CKAV-FM-10, 106.7 MHz) also defunct.
CKLN-FM	Toronto	88.1 FM	License revoked in 2011 due to regulatory non-compliance. Succeeded as an Internet radio service by Radio Regent. Frequency assigned to CIND-FM, which began broadcasting in 2013.
CKRG-FM	Toronto	89.9 FM	Station left the air in 2010.
CKO-FM-2	Toronto	99.1 FM	Flagship of a national news radio network; discontinued by owner in 1989.
CIRR-FM	Toronto	103.9 FM	Station left the air on September 1, 2023
CFPT-FM	Toronto	106.5 FM	The station ceased operations on September 1, 2025.
CFWP-FM	Wahta	98.3 FM	
CJWE-FM	Walford	98.5 FM	On November 1, 1995, The Canadian Wildlife Experience Inc. received a licence to operate a new low-power tourist information radio station to serve Massey, Walford and Spanish, Ontario at 98.5 MHz, during the spring, summer and fall seasons. Its uncertain when the station discontinued their seasonal broadcasts and left the air. The Canadian Wildlife Experience had not filed any renewals and applications with the CRTC.
== Prince Edward Island ==
CIMN-FM	Charlottetown	90.3 FM	Former University of Prince Edward Island campus radio station; ceased operations in 2000.
== Quebec ==
CKBH	Baie-Comeau	790 AM	1980–1982. CKBH went dark in 1982 due to financial problems.
CKBG	CFB Bagotville	1450 AM	1964?-1974?. English language radio station for the military community stationed at CFB Bagotville. Owned, operated and funded by CFB Bagotville's Non Public Funds. Staff were volunteers but did receive a courtesy pay of approx $2.00 per hour of air time. Programming consisted of news local on Base activities, community events and easy listening music. Hours varied but live broadcasting was generally between the hours of 8:00 AM to 10:PM 7 days a week. CBC AM English language programing was piped in by a landline from Quebec City and aired before and after CKBG local programming hours, as well as the hourly news. Ceased operations when the military Anglo community diminished substantially in the mid 70's.
CHIB	Chibougamau	1340 AM	
CFIN-FM	Coaticook	104.5 FM	1983–1987. Later superseded on this frequency by CIGR-FM Sherbrooke in 2003, which would go dark in 2011 as CJTS-FM.
CKRV	Drummondville	1400 AM	1974–1984
CHFO	Gatineau	1350 AM	On November 29, 2017, the CRTC approved an application by Radio Communautaire Francophone et Francophile de l’Outaouais to operate a new French-language community radio station in Gatineau, Quebec. The station signed on in 2018 but left the air in 2019.
CHEF	Granby	1450 AM	CHEF left the air in 1996 due to financial problems.
CKCH	Hull	970 AM	Station left the air in 1994.
CKLM	Laval	1570 AM	1962–1994. Frequency since occupied by CJLV.
CFRM	Moisie (CFS Moisie)	1340 AM	1964-? CFRM began broadcasting from the radar site in 1964 with a 10 watt output located at 1340 kHz on the AM dial. It is unknown when the station left the air.
CKBM	Montmagny	1490 AM	1954–83. CKBM went dark in Aug. 1983 due to financial problems.
CHLP	Montreal	1410 AM	Frequency later occupied by CFMB, 1962–1997; slated to become new frequency for CJWI 1610.
CHYC	Montreal		
CINF	Montreal	690 AM	Ceased operations in 2010; since superseded by the relocation of CKGM from 990 AM.
CINW	Montreal	940 AM	Ceased operations in 2010; to be superseded by a newly licensed station at this frequency.
CHRF	Montreal	980 AM	Signed off on May 31, 2020
CJMS	Montreal	1280 AM	Ceased operations in 1994; since superseded by the relocation of CFMB from 1410 AM.
CFTL	Montreal	96.7 FM	Was a pirate radio station which also broadcast on 6045 kHz on shortwave.
CJRM-FM	Montreal	98.5 FM	Frequency since occupied by CHMP-FM.
CFOX/CKO	Pointe-Claire	1470 AM	1960–89. CKO was the only AM outlet of the defunct CKO all-news network, which bought the station in late 1977. All other CKO stations across the country were FM. Before CKO was bought by the network, it was licensed as CFOX. CKO left the air at the same time the entire CKO network closed down for good, during the noon newscast (Eastern Time) on Nov. 10, 1989. The problems leading to the closing of the network were due to poor ratings and a breakdown in the negotiations concerning the ongoing sale of the operation. The network never returned to the air, and many of the original FM frequencies used by the CKO stations in major cities have since been awarded to other licensees. The Montréal AM frequency used by CKO has never been reactivated.
CFOM	Quebec City	1350 AM	1949–1976. The CRTC revoked the license of CFOM in 1976 for repeated format violations.
CHRC	Quebec City	800 AM	1926–2012.
CIMI-FM	Quebec City (Charlesbourg)	103.7 FM	2001–2008.
CKCV	Quebec City	1280 AM	1926–90. CKCV was closed on September 21, 1990, in order for its owner, Telemedia, to apply to purchase CHRC, also in Quebec City. The CRTC denied the sale of CHRC to Telemedia, but CKCV remained dark.
CJRP	Quebec City	1060 AM	
CKTS	Sherbrooke	900 AM	
CJTS-FM	Sherbrooke	104.5 FM	2004–2011. Ceased operations when interim owners Cogeco was unable to find a new owner for the station.
== Saskatchewan ==
CJOS-FM	Caronport	92.7 FM	Briercrest Bible College The station launched in 1995, but ceased broadcasting and revoked its license in 2006.
CFRG	Gravelbourg	710 AM	Became a rebroadcaster of CBKF-FM.
CKSF-FM	Prince Albert	90.1 FM	Société canadienne-française de Prince Albert previously launched CKSF-FM, a community-owned rebroadcaster of CBKF-FM which had gone off the air. The new station will be launched at 90.1 MHz in Prince Albert as a full-time rebroadcaster of Ici Radio-Canada Première's CBKF-FM Regina which was approved by the CRTC on August 7, 2020
CFNS	Saskatoon	860 AM	Became a rebroadcaster of CBKF-FM.
CJUS-FM	Saskatoon		Former University of Saskatchewan campus radio station, discontinued in 1985. Relaunched in 2005 as an Internet radio service.
CJWC	Saskatoon		
CHSK-FM	Swift Current	95.7 FM	Became a rebroadcaster of CBK-FM (CBK-FM-4)
CHSC	Unity		
== Yukon ==
CKRW	Whitehorse	610 AM	Continues as CKRW-FM 96.1
CHLA-FM	Whitehorse	93.5 FM	1984–2003. Operated as a legislature broadcaster, airing proceedings of the Yukon Legislative Assembly.

== See also ==
- List of defunct CBC radio transmitters in Canada
- Radio Canada International
- Weatheradio Canada

== Notes ==
On March 3, 1986, the CRTC approved the Canadian Broadcasting Corporation's application to add low-power English-language AM radio stations in the following communities: Carolin, Coquihalla Lakes, Haig, Hope, Hunter Creek, Kingsvale, Merritt North, Merritt South and Sowaqua, British Columbia. The stations would operate on the frequency of 1490 kHz, each with a transmitter power of 20 watts, to provide a travellers information service. The CRTC also approved the CBC's application to operate a radio station at Swartz Bay Ferry Terminal, on the frequency 1260 kHz with a transmitter power of 5 watts, to provide a marine and local weather service. The CRTC approved the CBC's application to operate a French-language AM radio station at Elk Island National Park, Alberta on frequency 1210 kHz with a day-time and night-time power of 20 watts and an English-language radio station to operate at 1540 kHz. It is currently unknown if these radio stations are still in operation.
