= Media in Sault Ste. Marie, Ontario =

This is a list of media in Sault Ste. Marie, Ontario, Canada. For stations licensed to Sault Ste. Marie, Michigan, see that city's article.

== Radio ==
The first radio station in Sault Ste. Marie was CJIC which signed on in 1934. It became CFYN in 1977 when the assets of the station were sold to Gilder Broadcasting. CKCY became the Canadian Sault's second radio station, signing on in 1955. Both AM stations shut down in 1992 as part of one of Canada's first local management agreements, entered into by Pelmorex Radio Network, the managing partner in this case, and Telemedia. The market's first FM station was CJIC in 1964, which later became CHAS in 1992. That same year, country station CJQM launched as CHAS' sister station, with both continuing to broadcast to the region. Two different tourist information stations have aired to this market, though neither currently air.

The Canadian Broadcasting Corporation has aired CBC Radio One and Ici Radio-Canada Première to the Sault Ste. Marie market on CBSM-FM and CBON-18 since 1981 and 1982 respectively, while Sault Ste. Marie has had two Christian stations (CHIM-6 from 2001 to 2012 and CJTK-8 since September 2017.) Aside from the Timmins-based CHIM, all are repeated from Sudbury stations.

Sault Ste. Marie hosts one active internet radio station, The Borderline, which airs programming and music primarily devoted to regional musicians. Sault Ste. Marie was also the originating location of the internet rock radio station Energy Rock Radio before it relocated to British Columbia in 2011. In 2014, Village Media launched its own network of six internet radio stations dedicated to Sault Ste. Marie under the banner of VM Radio, though it ceased operations by 2017.

Although Sault Ste. Marie is the second largest city in Northeastern Ontario, it has fewer of its own radio stations than the smaller North Bay or Timmins markets do, because of its location within the broadcast range of the Sault Ste. Marie and Newberry, Michigan radio market. However, many of these Michigan stations broadcast content and advertising geared toward listeners in Sault Ste. Marie, Ontario, which is by far the largest city in their broadcast range.

Frequency	Call sign	Branding	Format	Owner	Notes
FM 88.1	CBON-FM-18	Ici Radio-Canada Première	news/talk	Canadian Broadcasting Corporation	French; repeats CBON-FM, Sudbury
FM 89.5	CBSM-FM	CBC Radio One	news/talk	Canadian Broadcasting Corporation	Repeats CBCS-FM, Sudbury
FM 100.5	CHAS-FM	Kiss 100.5	hot adult contemporary	Rogers Media	
FM 104.3	CJQM-FM	104.3 The Fox	mainstream rock	Rogers Media	
FM 106.5	CJTK-FM-8	KFM	Christian	Harvest Ministries Sudbury	Repeats CJTK-FM, Sudbury

=== Defunct radio stations ===
- AM 530 CIRS - tourist information (Sault Ste. Marie International Bridge) owned by Rogers Communications (was launched by Telemedia in 1986). Ceased operating in 2010.
- AM 920 CKCY - 1955-1992
- AM 1050 CFYN - 1934-1992
- FM 92.9 CFWJ-FM - tourist information owned by Elliott Communications. Operated sometime after 2001, ceased operating in 2011 and license expired 2014.
- FM 97.3 CHIM-FM-6 - 1996-2012 Christian radio (rebroadcaster of CHIM-FM Timmins) owned by Roger de Brabant (1158556 Ontario Ltd.)

== Television ==
Sault Ste. Marie is home to one television station which is locally licensed, CHBX-TV. However, that station effectively acts as a satellite of Sudbury's CICI-TV as part of the CTV Northern Ontario system — the station's only direct local production consists of news reports which air as part of regional newscasts produced at the Sudbury station. The city formerly also had its own CBC Television affiliate, CJIC-TV, and a TVO transmitter at CICO-TV-20. However, CJIC-TV was acquired directly by the CBC in 2002, and became a straight analogue rebroadcaster of CBLT-DT from Toronto; the repeater for both CJIC-TV and CICO-TV-20 would close down on July 31, 2012, due to budget cuts. Sault Ste. Marie is not designated as a mandatory market for digital television conversion.

Sault Ste. Marie also easily receives American network affiliates over the air from Sault Ste. Marie, Michigan, all of which are rebroadcasters of downstate stations from Traverse City or Cadillac. These include the region's ABC, CBS, Fox, and NBC affiliates, plus the specialty subchannels Comet, MeTV, Laff, QVC, and HSN. The religious Three Angels Broadcasting Network is also available over the air from Sault Ste. Marie, Michigan with more powerful or amplified digital antennas.

OTA channel	OTA virtual channel (PSIP)	Shaw Cable	Call sign	Network	Notes
2 (VHF)	–	11	CHBX-TV	CTV	De facto rebroadcaster of CICI-TV (Sudbury)
15 (UHF)	12.1	3	CIII-DT-12	Global	Rebroadcaster of CIII-DT-41 (Toronto)
38 (UHF)	–	8	CHCH-TV-5	Independent	Rebroadcaster of CHCH-DT (Hamilton)

=== Cable ===
The cable provider in Sault Ste. Marie is Shaw Cable, which broadcasts CHBX, CIII, and CHCH on basic cable packages in the area, as well as Shaw's own local access channel Shaw Spotlight, which features local programming, news reports, city council meetings and many live Sault Ste. Marie Greyhounds games.

Shaw Cable no longer carries any of the local American network feeds, opting instead for satellite delivery (via Shaw Broadcast Services) of network affiliates from Detroit, save for WUHF, the FOX affiliate in Rochester, New York. Prior to the early 2000s, Shaw carried local channels WWUP (CBS) and WTOM (NBC), with ABC programs fed from Flint (WJRT-TV) and PBS programming from Marquette (WNMU).

== Print ==
Other media include the daily broadsheet Sault Star (founded 1912) and weekly tabloid Sault This Week (founded in 1967) and both owned by Postmedia Network).

== Web ==
Online news sites such as SooToday.com, HockeyNewsNorth.com, SaultOnline.com and SaultSports.com have emerged in recent years, due in large part to news cutbacks at CTV Northern Ontario and the Sault Star.
