= CHSC =

CHSC may refer to:

- Certified Health and Safety Consultant, a designation granted by the Canadian Society of Safety Engineering
- Cleveland Hearing & Speech Center, Ohio, US
- Coffs Harbour Senior College, New South Wales, Australia
- Committee on Home-School Co-operation, Hong Kong
- Community Human Services Corporation, Pittsburgh, Pennsylvania, US
- Canadian Home Shopping Channel, a former name of The Shopping Channel
- CHSC (AM), a radio station in St. Catharines, Ontario, Canada
- CHSC (Unity, Saskatchewan), a radio station in Canada 1923–1929
