= CFYN =

Former radio station in Ontario, Canada

- Sault Ste. Marie, Ontario; Canada
- Frequency: 1050 kHz

Programming
- Format: Contemporary hit radio

Ownership
- Owner: Telemedia
- Sister stations: CHAS-FM

History
- First air date: October 25, 1934
- Last air date: August 31, 1992
- Former call signs: CJIC (1934–1977)

Technical information
- Class: B
- Power: 10,000 watts day 2,500 watts night

CFYN was a Canadian AM radio station, which broadcast at 1050 kHz in Sault Ste. Marie, Ontario, from 1977 to 1992. From 1934 to 1977, the station broadcast with the call sign CJIC.

== CJIC ==
The first radio station in Sault Ste. Marie, CJIC signed on on October 25, 1934. It was owned by Grant Hyland and Jack Whitby and broadcast from studios in the Windsor Hotel. By 1935, programming had been expanded and, over time, several notable announcers were added to the staff.

In 1936, Hyland bought out his partner to take total control of the station.

In 1939, the first radio station in Sault Ste. Marie, Michigan, WSOO signed on. This introduced competition to the market for both listeners and advertising dollars. Services were expanded with more news and sports coverage being introduced, as both stations tried to serve both cities. CJIC became an affiliate of the CBC Trans-Canada Network while WSOO was an affiliate of ABC. Service to the market became more cosmopolitan as a result.

On March 29, 1941, CJIC moved from 1500 kHz to 1490 kHz. It is unknown if 1500 kHz was the original AM frequency used when CJIC first launched in 1934. Prior to the station's permanent sign off in 1992 as CFYN, the frequency was at 1050 kHz. The date of the frequency change to 1050 kHz is unknown.

In 1955, Highland Broadcasting opened CJIC-TV, bringing CBC Television service to the Sault.

In 1956, Hyland died, leaving the stations to his family. Russ Ramsay was appointed manager.

With CJIC presenting a popular music, news and sports format, in 1964, CJIC-FM signed on, presenting a varied mix of easy listening programming to Sault Ste. Marie. Hyland Radio and TV also established a station in Wawa called CJWA. Some of the programming on this station was simulcast from CJIC.

=== CJIC personalities ===
Bruce Smith and Don Sims were both announcers at CJIC. They went on to have lengthy careers with CBC.

Mac McCurdy went on to be the president of Standard Broadcasting.

Don Ramsay introduced country music on radio to the twin Saults from 1942 to 1986. He was also a founding member of the Country Music Disc Jockey Association.

Harvey Kirck's first on-air staff job was as a newscaster on CJIC in 1948. He went on to co-present the CTVNational News with Lloyd Robertson.

John Rhodes was a popular radio morning show host and television host and sportscaster. He was elected mayor of Sault Ste. Marie and was later elected as the Sault's MLA at Queen's Park from 1971 to 1978. During that time, he was Ontario's minister of transportation.

In addition to being the station manager, Russ Ramsay was a well-known sportscaster and play-by-play announcer. He was elected MLA after John Rhodes died, and held the post from 1978 to 1985. He held the labour portfolio in the Bill Davis Conservative government at Queen's Park.

== Sale of Hyland Radio and TV ==
In 1976, the Hyland family sold its radio, television and cable interests to Huron Broadcasting, owned by a group of businessmen from Sault Ste. Marie and Sudbury. Huron also bought CKCY, CKCY-FM, CJNR in Blind River, CKNR in Elliot Lake and CKNS in Espanola from Algonquin Broadcasting.

Due to CRTC regulations regarding concentration of media ownership, Huron was required to sell one AM and one FM license in Sault Ste. Marie. Huron sold CJIC and CJIC-FM to Gilder Broadcasting, owned by the former CKCY personality Russ Hilderly and a local businessman, Bruce Pickersgill.

As part of CRTC approval of the sale, Gilder Broadcasting was given new call signs for its radio stations and on February 1, 1977, the stations became CFYN and CHAS-FM.

== CFYN ==
CFYN broadcast in Sault Ste. Marie from 1977 to 1992. Following the change of ownership in 1977, the majority of the on-air staff and news departments of Hyland and Algonquin stayed with Huron Broadcasting, leaving Gilder Broadcasting to find a new staff for its two stations.

On February 1, 1977, CFYN signed on with an on-air line-up that included Norman M from 6:00 to 10:00 am. Joe Petrolo was the main news presenter and Randy Russon was the sports director. Russ Hilderley, president and CEO of Gilder, hosted Reaching Out, a daily phone-in program from 10:00 am to noon. Other hosts included Fred Edwards from noon to 2:00 pm and Brian W. Martin from 2:00 to 6:00 pm. From 6:00 pm on, the station broadcast a variety of CBC and syndicated programming. The overnight program was simulcast from CHAS-FM.

=== CFYN personalities ===
Bob Wood was the morning show host over a three-year period from 1979 to 1982. "Woody" brought an outrageous style and humour that Sault radio had not really heard to that point. Wood subsequently moved to North Bay, where he was the federal member of parliament for Nipissing from 1988 to 2004.

News director John Campbell, who joined the station in 1979, introduced listeners to the daily "Campbell Comment". His commentaries ranged from goings on at Algoma Steel to the Language Resolution and beyond and often generated talk in the community and occasionally rebuttals and headlines in the local papers.

== Sale to Telemedia ==
In 1985, CFYN and CHAS-FM were sold to Telemedia Communications. But just as Telemedia was establishing itself in the Sault Ste. Marie market, unregulated all hit radio in the form of WYSS was being introduced in Sault Ste. Marie, Michigan. The arrival of YES-FM fragmented the Sault Ste. Marie radio audience and made it increasingly difficult for AM music based formats to maintain their audiences. CFYN struggled over the next seven years changing formats several times from adult contemporary, to a combination of news, sports and oldies, to country music.

In 1992, Telemedia and the Pelmorex Radio Network, then owners of CKCY and CJQM-FM applied to the CRTC and were allowed to shut down both CFYN and CKCY. The two FM stations went on to form one of Canada's first LMAs and moved into shared office and studio space, with Pelmorex being the managing partner in the arrangement. Fifteen staff at the former Telemedia operation were laid off.

CFYN went dark on August 31, 1992.
