= Huron Broadcasting =

Canadian broadcasting company

Huron Broadcasting was a Canadian radio and television broadcasting company, active in Sault Ste. Marie from 1976 to 1990.

The company first entered the broadcasting business in 1976, when it acquired the assets of the city's prior Hyland Broadcasting and Algonquin Broadcasting companies, including CJIC-TV and the radio stations CJIC, CJIC-FM, CKCY and CKCY-FM, as well as CJWA in Wawa, CKNR in Elliot Lake, CJNR in Blind River and CKNS in Espanola.

Due to concentration of media ownership rules, Huron then sold the CJIC radio stations to another new company, Gilder Broadcasting, shortly after the merger was completed. (Gilder changed those stations' call signs to CFYN and CHAS.)

Huron subsequently also opened CKCY-TV in 1977.

Huron sold its radio stations to other owners in the mid-1980s. Telemedia acquired Sault Ste. Marie's CJIC and CJIC-FM, by this time known as CFYN and CHAS-FM, in 1985, while the remaining stations were sold to Mid-Canada Radio in two separate transactions, in 1986 (the stations in Blind River, Elliot Lake and Espanola) and 1988 (the remaining stations in Sault Ste. Marie and Wawa).

The television stations were acquired by Baton Broadcasting in 1990, and were converted by Baton to the MCTV branding in use on the Mid-Canada Television stations in Sudbury, Timmins and North Bay, which had been acquired by Baton in the same year. At the same time Mid-Canada sold the radio stations to Pelmorex, where they formed part of the Pelmorex Radio Network until 1998.
