= CKCY =

CKCY may refer to:

- CJQM-FM, a radio station (104.3 FM) licensed to Sault Ste. Marie, Ontario, Canada, which held the call sign CKCY-FM from 1965 to 1985
- CHBX-TV, a television station (channel 2) licensed to Sault Ste. Marie, Ontario, Canada, which held the call sign CKCY-TV from 1977 to 1985
- CKCY (AM), a defunct radio station (920 AM) formerly licensed to Sault Ste. Marie, Ontario, Canada
