= CJWA-FM =

Radio station in Wawa, Ontario

Coordinates: 48°01′13″N 84°45′00″W

- Wawa, Ontario; Canada
- Frequency: 107.1 MHz
- Branding: JJAM FM

Programming
- Format: Adult contemporary

Ownership
- Owner: Labbe Media

History
- First air date: 1998
- Call sign meaning: "Wawa" (broadcast area)

Technical information
- Class: A
- ERP: 210 watts
- HAAT: 122 metres (400 ft)

Links
- Webcast: Listen Live
- Website: jjamfm.live

CJWA-FM is a Canadian radio station, broadcasting at 107.1 FM in Wawa, Ontario. The station broadcasts an adult contemporary format under the on-air brand JJAM FM.

== History ==
=== The original CJWA ===
CJWA was originally launched in 1964 by Sault Ste. Marie's Highland Broadcasting as an AM station, broadcasting at 1240 kHz on the AM dial. The station aired a mixture of original programming and simulcasting of the Sault station CJIC and was a CBC Radio affiliate until 1985. In 1976, an ownership shuffle in the Sault gave CJWA to Huron Broadcasting, which converted the station's simulcast source to its own CKCY.

On December 13, 1984, the CRTC approved a number of applications for a number of AM radio stations across Ontario including CJWA Wawa to increase their nighttime power from 250 watts to 1,000 watts.

In 1985, CKCY and CJWA were acquired by CKCY 920 Ltd., who again changed the station's simulcasting source, this time to CKCY's sister station CJQM. In 1988, the stations were acquired by the Mid-Canada Radio network, which in turn was sold to the Pelmorex Radio Network in 1990. Pelmorex changed the station's simulcasting source again, this time to CHAS.

Pelmorex subsequently closed CJWA 1240 AM in September 1996, leaving Wawa without a locally based radio station. (The only other stations serving Wawa at the time were those rebroadcasting CBC Radio and Radio-Canada from Sudbury.)

=== Rebirth of CJWA on FM ===
In 1998, North Superior Broadcasting received approval from the CRTC to establish a new FM station, which would replace their existing Wawa rebroadcaster of CFNO-FM in Marathon; the station adopted the "CJWA-FM" call sign as an homage to the original CJWA that closed down two years earlier. In 1999, the station added a rebroadcast transmitter, CJWA-FM-1 100.7 FM in Chapleau, also through conversion of an existing CFNO retransmitter, as well as a new rebroadcaster at Michipicoten, CJWA-FM-3 100.7 FM.

In 2002, CJWA-FM was acquired by Labbe Media and now operates under the supervision of president and CEO Rick Labbe.

On January 18, 2005, Labbe Media received approval by the CRTC to change the authorized contours of CJWA-FM-1 Chapleau by decreasing the effective radiated power from 130 watts to 111 watts and by decreasing the effective antenna height from 37 metres to 30.5 metres.

== Transmitters ==
Rebroadcasters of CJWA-FM
City of licence	Identifier	Frequency	Power	Class	RECNet
Chapleau	CJWA-FM-1	100.7 FM	111 watts	A1	Query
Michipicoten	CJWA-FM-3	100.7 FM	5 watts	LP	Query

== Other ==
- JJAM FM Radio Blog | Just another WordPress.com weblog
- JJAM FM Radio from blogspot.com
