= List of radio stations in Canada =

The following is a list of radio stations in Canada. They are organized in a number of ways.

== Stations by format ==
- List of Christian radio stations in Canada
- List of high school radio stations in Canada
- List of campus radio stations in Canada
- List of community radio stations in Canada

== Stations by location (province or territory) ==
- List of radio stations in Alberta
- List of radio stations in British Columbia
- List of radio stations in Manitoba
- List of radio stations in New Brunswick
- List of radio stations in Newfoundland and Labrador
- List of radio stations in the Northwest Territories
- List of radio stations in Nova Scotia
- List of radio stations in Nunavut
- List of radio stations in Ontario
- List of radio stations in Prince Edward Island
- List of radio stations in Quebec
- List of radio stations in Saskatchewan
- List of radio stations in Yukon

== Stations by network ==
=== National ===
==== Networked programming ====
- CBC Radio One
- CBC Music
- CBC Radio 3
- Ici Radio-Canada Première
- Ici Musique

==== Networked brands ====
- Bounce Radio (Adult hits, Bell Media)
- Jewel (Soft AC, Evanov)
- Kiss Radio (CHR or hot AC, Rogers Media)
- Move Radio (Hot AC, Bell Media)
- Pure Country (Country, Bell Media)
- Virgin Radio (CHR, licensed by Bell Media)

=== Quebec ===
- CKOI
- Rouge FM
- Réseau des Appalaches
- Rythme FM
- Énergie

=== First Nations ===
- Native Communications (Manitoba)
- Missinipi Broadcasting Corporation (Saskatchewan)
- Aboriginal Voices (defunct)
- Wawatay Native Communications Society (Ontario)
- CFWE (Alberta)

=== Defunct ===
- Canadian Pacific Radio
- Canadian Radio Broadcasting Commission
- CKO
- CNR Radio
- Corus Quebec
- Dominion Network
- Haliburton Broadcasting Group
- Larche Communications
- Mid-Canada Radio
- Pelmorex Radio Network
- Souvenirs Garantis
- The Team
- Trans-Canada Network

==== Closed ====
- List of defunct radio stations in Canada

== Stations by ownership group ==
- Acadia Broadcasting
- Bell Media Radio
- Blackburn Radio
- CHIN Radio/TV International
- Corus Entertainment
- Evanov Communications
- Fairchild Radio
- Golden West Broadcasting
- Le5 Communications
- Jim Pattison Group
- Maritime Broadcasting System
- My Broadcasting Corporation
- RNC Media
- Rogers Sports & Media
- Slaight Communications
- Stingray Digital
- Vista Broadcast Group
- UCB Media Canada

=== Defunct ===
- Maclean-Hunter
- Selkirk Communications
- Telemedia
- Western International Communications
- Astral Media
- Clear Sky Radio

== Satellite radio ==
- SiriusXM Canada

== See also ==
- Border blaster
- Call signs in Canada
- Media ownership in Canada
- List of Internet radio stations
- Pirate radio in North America
