= Chim =

Chim may refer to:

- Chim, Iran. a village in Jarahi Rural District, Iran
- CHIM-FM, a radio station in Timmins, Ontario, Canada
  - CHIM-FM-5, a former radio station in Red Deer, Alberta, Canada, rebroadcaster of CHIM-FM

== People ==
- Zhan (surname), romanized as Chim in Cantonese
  - Chim Pui-chung (born 1946), Hong Kong politician
  - Jim Chim (born 1965), Hong Kong stage actor and comedian
- Rama II of Siam (1767–1824), birth name Chim
- Chim Lingrel (1899–1962), American football player
- David Seymour (photographer) (1911–1956), nicknamed Chim, Polish photographer
