= CJNR =

CJNR has at least two meanings:

- CJNR (AM), an AM radio station in Blind River, Ontario, Canada, which ceased broadcasting in 1997 after converting to the FM band as CKNR-FM.
- CJNR-FM, an FM radio station in Windsor, Ontario, Canada
- the Canadian Journal of Nursing Research, a medical research journal in Canada.
