= CHOV =

CHOV may refer to:

- CHVR-FM, a radio station (96.7 FM) licensed to Pembroke, Ontario, Canada, which held the call sign CHOV from 1942 to 1981
- CHRO-TV, a television station (channel 5) licensed to Pembroke, Ontario, Canada, which held the call sign CHOV-TV from 1961 to 1977
