= CFTL =

CFTL may refer to:

- CFTL-FM 100.3, a radio station in Big Trout Lake, Ontario, Canada
- CFTL (pirate radio), a pirate radio station that operated in Montreal, Quebec, Canada from 1969 to 1971
