= CJIC =

CJIC was the historic callsign of three broadcast outlets in Sault Ste. Marie, Ontario, Canada:

- CJIC, an AM radio station launched in 1935, which subsequently used the callsign CFYN from 1977 until its shutdown in 1992,
- CJIC-FM, an FM radio station launched in 1964, which changed its callsign to CHAS in 1977,
- CJIC-TV, a television station which broadcast from 1954 to 2002.
