= Don Ramsay =

- Born: 1923
- Origin: Sault Ste. Marie, Ontario, Canada
- Died: 2001 (aged 77–78)
- Genres: Country
- Occupation(s): Radio personality, DJ, singer

Don Ramsay was a Sault Ste. Marie, Ontario personality who had a 45-year career primarily on CJIC radio and CJIC-TV. Ramsay became well known as "your old saddle pal" and as "the dean of country music".

== History ==
Beginning in 1941 at the age of 18, Ramsay spent his years on the air in Sault Ste. Marie introducing listeners to country music through programs such as Riding the Range, Country Gospel and Sunday on the Range.

Ramsay's efforts to promote "western", "hillbilly", and "old-time music" genres were a part of the early movement to bring country music more into the mainstream. In 1952, Ramsay was one of 35 founding members of the Country Music Disc Jockey Association, the forerunner of the Country Music Association.

On CJIC-TV, he hosted and sang on the weekly program Down Yonder Ranch from 1956 to 1959. This show featured a wide variety of local and celebrity performers of the day.

Beginning in 1953, Ramsay began hosting what became one of the longest-running programs on Sault Ste. Marie radio, his annual New Year's Eve Salute To Hank Williams. The program ran until 1986 and the final show featured guest appearances by Audrey Williams and Hank Williams Jr.

Don Ramsay retired from his on-air duties in 1986 but remained active as an adviser to many local artists and touring acts. He also continued to work as the host and MC of many local country music events.

Don Ramsay died on September 5, 2001, at the age of 78.

== Concert Promoter ==
As a promoter, Don was responsible for bringing many early country artists to the Sault, some for the first time, including Hank Williams, Tommy Hunter, Johnny Cash, Flatt & Scruggs to name a few. Hank Williams appeared in the Sault in 1949 at Ramsay's invitation and performed at two sold-out shows.

== Performer ==
From 1942 to 1948 he was the lead singer and MC of "Don Ramsay's Ramblers".

== Awards ==
- Mr. DJ USA - 1954
- Johnny Cash Award of Merit - 1961.
- City of Sault Ste. Marie "Don Ramsay Day" - 1987
- Inducted into the Northern Ontario Country Music Hall of Fame - 1991
- Sault Ste. Marie Award of Merit - 1992
