= Helen Newell Garfield =

American socialite and advocate for deaf education

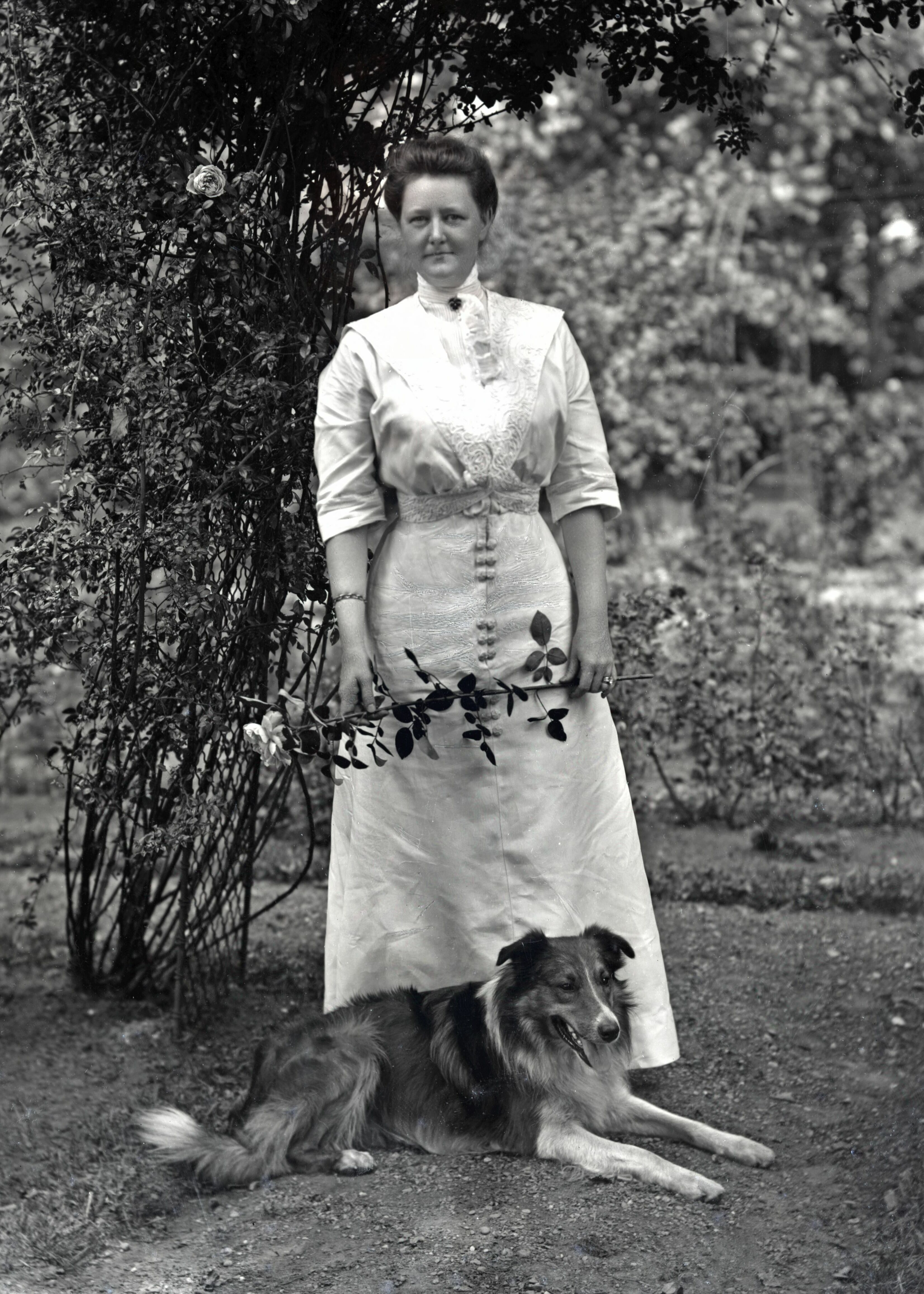
- Garfield in 1911
- Born: February 12, 1866; Chicago, Illinois, U.S.
- Died: 20 August 1930 (aged 64)
- Occupations: Socialite, advocate for deaf education
- Known for: Founded the Cleveland Association for the Hard of Hearing and the Lake Erie School of Speech Reading (now the Cleveland Hearing & Speech Center)
- Spouse: James Rudolph Garfield (m. 1890)
- Children: 4
- Relatives: James A. Garfield (father-in-law)

Helen Newell Hills Garfield (February 12, 1867 – August 20, 1930) was an American socialite and advocate for deaf education. She was herself hard of hearing in adulthood. During World War I, she worked with the American Red Cross and raised funds for the care of French orphans.

== Early life ==
Helen Newell Hills was born in Chicago, Illinois, the daughter of John Newell and Judith Poore Hills. Both of her parents were born in Massachusetts. Her father was a railroad president.

== Career ==
Helen Newell Garfield had four children born in the 1890s, and was a society figure in Washington, D. C., from 1902 to 1909, while her husband James Rudolph Garfield was working with President Theodore Roosevelt in various capacities, including as Secretary of the Interior. While in Washington, she helped to found the District of Columbia branch of the Woman's Department of the National Civic Federation.

After the Garfields returned to Ohio in 1909, she founded the Lake Erie School of Speech Reading and the Cleveland Association for the Hard of Hearing in 1921, and was involved with the American Federation of Organizations for the Hard of Hearing. She also worked for the creation of lip reading classes in the Cleveland Public Schools. Helen Newell Garfield was herself hard of hearing in adulthood.

For her fundraising work on behalf of war orphans during World War I, she received a decoration from the King and Queen of Belgium. She also served as an inspector at the Bureau of Supplies, American Red Cross, screening donated knitted goods for quality and fit.

== Personal life and legacy ==
In 1890, Helen Newell married lawyer and politician James Rudolph Garfield, a son of President James A. Garfield. They had four sons, John, James II, Newell, and Rudolph. Their home in Mentor, Ohio, was called "Hollycroft". Her sons James and John served in the United States Army during World War I.

Helen Garfield died in 1930, aged 63 years, from injuries sustained in an automobile accident in New Hampshire. Her papers and her husband's papers are archived in the Library of Congress. Some of her teaching materials are in the papers of her son James A. Garfield II in the Western Reserve Historical Society. Garfield's school of speech reading is now the Cleveland Hearing & Speech Center, affiliated with Case Western Reserve University.
