= CFAJ =

Radio station in St. Catharines, Ontario

- St. Catharines, Ontario; Canada
- Broadcast area: Niagara Region, Greater Toronto Area
- Frequency: 1220 kHz
- Branding: Classic 1220

Programming
- Format: Classic hits

Ownership
- Owner: Radio Dhun

History
- First air date: 2020

Technical information
- Licensing authority: CRTC
- Class: B
- Power: 10,000 watts

Links
- Website: classic1220.ca

CFAJ (1220 AM) is a commercial radio station in St. Catharines, Ontario, Canada. It is owned by Radio Dhun and it broadcasts a classic hits radio format.

CFAJ broadcasts with 10,000 watts using a directional antenna with a nine-tower array to prevent co-channel interference with WHKW Cleveland, as well as 1230 WECK in Cheektowaga, forty miles to the east. CFAJ can be heard as far north as parts of cottage country and west beyond Guelph. The transmitter is off Turner Road in Thorold, near the Welland Canal.

The 1220 frequency was previously assigned to CHSC which had its license revoked in 2010.

== History ==
=== 2012: Rejected application for 1220 ===
On July 10, 2012, 8045313 Canada Inc. (a numbered company unrelated to Pellpropco Inc.) applied for a new radio station which would broadcast a music format that would consist of a mix of past, present and emerging artists. If it had been approved, the new station would have operated at 1220 kHz, the former frequency used by CHSC until its shutdown in late 2010.

The application was denied by the CRTC on January 30, 2013. The 1220 frequency remained silent during this time.

=== 2015: New application for 1220 ===
On October 21, 2015, Sivanesarajah Kandiah submitted an application for 1220 kHz, which would operate with 10,000 watts full-time and would utilize the transmitting equipment previously used by CHSC. The station was proposed to have a classic hits format under the branding "Grapevine Radio". This application was approved on April 20, 2016.

After several years of construction and planning, 1220 returned to the air in 2020 with the new call sign CFAJ.
