= CJEU (AM) =

Radio station in Gatineau, Quebec, Canada

Coordinates: 45.4829°N 75.6844°W

- Gatineau, Quebec; Canada
- Broadcast area: National Capital Region
- Frequency: 1670 kHz (AM)
- Branding: French: Radio Jeunesse

Programming
- Language: French
- Format: community; children's radio

Ownership
- Owner: Fondation Radio-Enfant

History
- First air date: 2007
- Call sign meaning: From "jeune", French for young

Technical information
- Class: C
- Power: 1,000 watts

Links
- Webcast: Listen Live
- Website: radiojeunesse.ca

CJEU is a Canadian radio station licensed to broadcast a French language children's radio format at AM 1670 in Gatineau, Quebec. The license is held by Fondation Radio-Enfant, a non-profit educational agency. CJEU's transmitter is located off of Chem des Terres in Musee, Quebec.

Fondation Radio-Enfant was originally granted a short-term license, with the call sign CIRC-FM, on 96.5 MHz for the duration of the Rendez-vous de la Francophonie in 2002 and in 2003, Fondation Radio-Enfant was also granted to operate on 1250 kHz on the AM dial (formerly used by CBOF), however, due to possible technical issues, the station never went on the air. The 96.5 frequency in Gatineau was later reassigned to CFTX-FM, and Fondation Radio-Enfant was granted a permanent AM license in early 2007 to operate on 1670 kHz.

Initially, CJEU played music mainly in French and sung by children. Most of the music that is played, however, was not professionally recorded.

In late 2010, the station was renamed as Radio Oxygène, expanding its programming to include programs for teenagers and young adults. Programming for younger listeners was renamed Radio-Enfant-Ado. At one point, the station was known as Radio Jeunesse.

In 2011, CJEU temporarily simulcasted its programming on 1350 AM until the launch of CIRA-5 in 2012.

In 2015, the CRTC approved an ownership change for CJEU from Fondation Radio Enfant du Canada to Radio Communautaire Enfant-Ado de Gatineau-Ottawa.

On August 15, 2019, the CRTC issued a short-term license renewal for CJEU from September 1, 2019, to August 31, 2023. The short-term renewal would allow for an earlier review of the licensee's compliance with regulatory requirements.

On March 25, 2024, after being off the air for a year and a half and while waiting for funding to get their transmitter repaired, CJEU briefly returned to the air and then went off the air again on March 27 due to technical difficulties. More funding and transmitter repairs will be required.

CJEU is reportedly back on the air as of August 1, 2024.
