= CKOB (AM) =

Former radio station in Renfrew, Ontario

Rebroadcaster of CHVR Pembroke (1990–1996)
- Renfrew, Ontario; Canada
- Frequency: 1400 kHz

Ownership
- Owner: Pelmorex Broadcasting

History
- First air date: 1974
- Last air date: 1990
- Former call signs: CHVR-1 (1990–96)

Technical information
- Power: 1,000 watts

CKOB (originally part of Opeongo Broadcasting) radio located in Renfrew, Ontario, Canada, broadcast on 1400 kHz until the later half of 1996 using a non-directional 1,000-watt circular beam antenna.

== History ==
On December 21, 1973, Martin Burns on behalf of a company to be incorporated (OBCI) received approval from the CRTC to operate a new English-language AM radio station at Renfrew.

The station was launched in 1974. The three original founders of CKOB were Marty Burns, Terry Sammon and James Donnohue. The station was owned by Opeongo Broadcasting Co. Ltd. CKOB was sold to Jamie Pole in 1981.

Richard Armitage (program director) managed early 1980s announcers such as Bob Rose (sports director), Rick Niemi (music director), Gerard "Gerry" Gava and Brother Lee Nelson as they entertained the Ottawa Valley region with an assortment of cross-country, middle-of-the-road and adult contemporary music. The station was semi-automated between midnight and six in the morning playing back pre-recorded music from a simple reel-to-reel logger machine running at 3/32 inches per second.

Live local lunch time phone-in shows such as In the Mayor's Chair, hosted by then news director Terry Horner or Derek Neil put the listener directly in touch with the presiding mayor (Audrey Green) in an open forum to discuss topics of the day. Cathy Warren hosted the daily talk show.

In 1984, Jamie Pole launched sister station CKOA in Arnprior, with 250 watts, and one of the most modern solid state transmitters available at the time. The transmitter was the first of its type to be used in the Ottawa Valley and was 100% Canadian made. Peter DeWolf managed the new Arnprior station. The two station POLE network was then known "Ottawa Valley Radio".

On December 13, 1984, the CRTC approved a number of applications for a number of AM radio stations across Ontario including CKOB Renfrew to increase their nighttime power from 250 watts to 1,000 watts.

Ottawa Valley Radio, including CKOB in Renfrew and CKOA in Arnprior, was sold by then-owner Jamie Pole in 1991 to Annapolis Valley Radio Ltd. In their decision, the Canadian Radio-television and Telecommunications Commission (CRTC) believed this transaction would provide the stations a new opportunity for growth and community involvement. Unfortunately they also permitted the reduction of locally produced programming from 126 to 21 hours per week. Eventually Pelmorex acquired CKOB and CKOA, both of which were converted to rebroadcasters of CHRO in Pembroke.

CHVR moved to FM in 1996. Due to its signal strength, the Renfrew and Arnprior rebroadcasters were both discontinued. Local programming was also discontinued in both communities. No doubt feeling the backlash against these decisions, in 2004 the CRTC approved a new FM licensed station in Renfrew, Ontario to Jamie Pole's son, Jon Pole. Jon Pole, served as president of the new company along with business partner Andrew Dickson. Owned by My Broadcasting Corporation, with its first station in Renfrew, Ontario, their radio network now includes small and medium sized markets across eastern and southern Ontario. The new stations involve several of the same broadcasters as Ottawa Valley Radio, including Bob Rose, Rob Mise, Peter DeWolf, Andrew Dickson and others.
