= CIRA-FM =

Catholic radio station in Montreal

Coordinates: 45°30′20″N 73°35′30″W

- Montreal, Quebec; Canada
- Frequency: 91.3 MHz
- Branding: Radio Ville-Marie

Programming
- Language: French
- Format: Religious

Ownership
- Owner: Radio Ville-Marie

History
- First air date: 1994

Technical information
- Class: C1
- ERP: 36.2 kilowatts horizontal polarization only
- HAAT: 242.5 metres (796 ft)

Links
- Website: Radio VM website

CIRA-FM is a French language radio station located in Montreal, Quebec, Canada. Its studios are located at 5000 d'Iberville street in the Plateau Mont-Royal district of Montreal.

It broadcasts on 91.3 MHz with an effective radiated power of 36,200 watts (class C1) using an omnidirectional antenna located atop Mount Royal. Radio Ville-Marie now stylized as Radio VM received CRTC approval in 1994 to operate a new religious French-language FM radio programming at Montreal.

This radio station is Catholic and has a religious broadcasting format. Since its inception in 1995 it identifies itself as "Radio Ville-Marie". CIRA-FM is not a commercial broadcaster and as such does not carry paid advertising.

== Transmitters ==
In addition to the Montreal station on 91.3 FM, CIRA-FM also broadcasts on the following frequencies:

- CIRA-FM-1: Sherbrooke (100.3 FM) (licensed to Radio-Soleil-Estrie as a separate radiocommunication distribution undertaking) - launched September 20, 1998
- CIRA-FM-2: Trois-Rivières (89.9 FM) - launched September 9, 2005
- CIRA-FM-3: Victoriaville (89.3 FM) - launched January 5, 2006
- CIRA-FM-4: Rimouski (104.1 FM)

=== AM rebroadcaster ===
A transmitter for Canada's National Capital Region, CIRA-5 (1350 AM) in Gatineau, was on the air from 2012 to 2015. That transmitter received CRTC approval on September 23, 2009. In 2011, the 1350 AM transmitter began on-air testing, simulcasting the programming of CJEU 1670 AM temporarily until CIRA-FM officially launched its programs on 1350 AM as CIRA-5 in 2012. In 2015, CIRA-5 was shut down due to lack of money to keep that transmitter going. CIRA's FM transmitters remain unaffected with CIRA-5's shutdown. The 1350 AM frequency was a former frequency that was used by CHVR in Pembroke, Ontario, until it moved to FM in 1996. In 2018, CHFO in Gatineau occupied the AM 1350 frequency until it left the air in 2019.
