= CKOA (AM) =

Former radio station in Arnprior, Ontario

Semi-satellite of CKOB Renfrew (1985–1990) Rebroadcaster of CHVR Pembroke (1990–1996)

Arnprior, Ontario; Canada
- Frequency: 1490 kHz

Ownership
- Owner: Pelmorex Broadcasting

History
- First air date: April 18, 1985
- Last air date: 1990
- Former call signs: CHVR-2 (1990–96)

CKOA is a former radio station in Arnprior, Ontario that broadcast at AM 1490 kHz.

On February 14, 1985, Opeongo Broadcasting Co. Ltd. received approval for a new AM station at Arnprior. The new station would broadcast on 1490 kHz with a power of 250 watts. CKOA would simulcast programming of CKOB out of Renfrew, Ontario except for the mid-mornings which originated at the CKOA studio in Arnprior's Sullivan Industrial Park. CKOA signed on April 18. CKOA had several staff including a sales department and production duties and local programming was handled by Station Manager Peter DeWolf.

The station was sold in the late 1980s to Annapolis Valley Radio and later to Pelmorex Broadcasting, becoming a full-time repeater and ceasing local programming.

In 1990, CKOA became CHVR-2, as CKOB Renfrew became CHVR-1 and both stations were then re-broadcasters of CHVR in Pembroke.

In 1996, CHVR and the former CKOA and CKOB were combined into a new FM radio station at 96.7 MHz as CHVR-FM out of Pembroke to serve the Ottawa Valley. All three AM transmitters were deleted after the new FM station signed on.
