= CFCJ-FM =

Christian radio station in Ontario, Canada

Simulcast of CJTK-FM, Sudbury
- Cochrane, Ontario; Canada
- Frequency: 102.1 MHz
- Branding: KFM

Programming
- Format: Contemporary Christian music

Ownership
- Owner: Harvest Ministries Sudbury

History
- First air date: September 5, 2011

Technical information
- Licensing authority: CRTC
- ERP: 37 watts
- HAAT: 22.5 metres (74 ft)
- Transmitter coordinates: 49.0676°N 81.0270°W

Links
- Website: www.kfmradio.ca

CFCJ-FM is a Christian radio station which broadcasts at 102.1 MHz (FM) in Cochrane, Ontario, Canada. CFCJ-FM is currently owned by Harvest Ministries Sudbury, the owners of CJTK-FM.

== History ==
On April 18, 2011, Cochrane Christian Radio (CCR) received an approval by the Canadian Radio-television and Telecommunications Commission (CRTC) to operate a new English language low-power specialty FM radio programming undertaking to provide a Christian music service at 102.1 MHz in Cochrane, Ontario.

Cochrane Christian Radio (inc) is owner of CFCJ-FM.

The launch kick-off date was September 5, 2011 at the Glad Tidings Pentecostal Church in Cochrane.

On November 16, 2023, Harvest Ministries Sudbury (Harvest), the owners of CJTK-FM, submitted an application to acquire from Cochrane Christian Radio, the assets of the English language low-power commercial specialty (Religious music) FM radio station CFCJ-FM in Cochrane. The application was approved on June 18, 2024. On September 1, 2024, CJTK-FM signed on the air in Cochrane. Aside of being a rebroadcaster of CJTK-FM, CFCJ-FM may air local programming in Cochrane.
