= Committee on Home-School Co-operation =

- Traditional Chinese: 家庭與學校合作事宜委員會
- Simplified Chinese: 家庭与学校合作事宜委员会
Transcriptions
Standard Mandarin
- Hanyu Pinyin: Jiātíng yǔ Xuéxiào Hézuò Shìyí Wěiyuánhuì
Yue: Cantonese
- Yale Romanization: Gāa tìhng yúh hohk haauh hahp jok sih yìh wái yùhn wúi
- Jyutping: Gaa1 ting4 jyu5 hok6 haau6 hap6 zok3 si6 ji4 wai2 jyun4 wui2

Committee on Home-School Co-operation (CHSC) is an advisory body in Hong Kong aimed at promoting co-operation between parents and schools (home–school). Established in 1993, the committee advises the Education Bureau (EDB), other government departments, and non-government organisations on ways to promote parental involvement in education. Its work includes conducting surveys, allocating project grants to schools, publicising better home–school relations, and encouraging the establishment of parent–teacher associations (PTAs). The CHSC has been described as a "semi-governmental" organisation.

== Overview ==
The CHSC was set up in February 1993, on the recommendation of the Education Commission in its 1992 The Education Department Report No.5. Since then, the number of parent–teacher associations (PTAs) has increased from around 70 in 1992 to over 1,395 in the 2002–2003 academic year. As of January 2024, all government-operated schools and aided schools, as well as over one-third of kindergartens, have set up PTAs.

The CHSC has a total of 20 members as of January 2024. This includes an ex-officio member from the EDB and other members who are educators, parents with children enrolled in local schools, or professionals from the medical, legal, accountancy, and commercial sectors.
