= Cleveland Hearing & Speech Center =

US non-profit organization

Cleveland Hearing & Speech Center (CHSC) is a non-profit (501(c)(3)) organization based in Cleveland, Ohio, which supports special communication needs across the state's northeastern region with a variety of medical, educational, and advocacy services.

CHSC began in 1921 through the work of Helen Newell Garfield, who herself had recently experienced hearing loss. An advocate for the care and education of deaf children, Garfield founded the Lake Erie School of Speech Reading and promoted lip-reading classes in local public schools. Around this time, Garfield also established the Cleveland Association for the Hard of Hearing. In 1945, the Association merged with Western Reserve University's speech clinic to create Cleveland Hearing & Speech Center.

The organization is affiliated with Case Western Reserve University for research and for educational training of clinical students. For many years, CHSC's main clinic and the Community Center for the Deaf and Hard of Hearing shared an office on the university's campus. In July 2024, the headquarters relocated to the Midtown district. Later that year, the CCDHH opened a dedicated office in Parma Heights.

In addition to its Midtown headquarters, CHSC operates satellite clinics in Lyndhurst, Broadview Heights, and Westlake, focusing on audiology care and speech-language therapy. The organization's specialized clinical services support area schools and early intervention programs.

CHSC's Community Center for the Deaf and Hard of Hearing is the only such center in the region. Operated by and for Deaf community members, the CCDHH works for advocacy and provides comprehensive support programs, resources, American Sign Language interpreting, and ASL classes.

Despite the coincidental name, Cleveland Hearing & Speech Center has no affiliation with the Cleveland Clinic.
