= CHFO (AM) =

Former radio station in Gatineau, Quebec

- Gatineau, Quebec; Canada
- Frequency: 1350 kHz

Programming
- Language: French
- Format: Community radio

Ownership
- Owner: Radio Communautaire Francophone et Francophile de l’Outaouais

History
- First air date: 2018
- Last air date: 2019

Technical information
- Class: C
- Power: 1 kW (daytime); 0.18 kW (nighttime)

CHFO was a French language Canadian radio station transmitting on 1350 kHz (AM) in Gatineau, Quebec. The station had a community radio format.

== History ==
On November 29, 2017, the Canadian Radio-television and Telecommunications Commission (CRTC) approved an application by Radio Communautaire Francophone et Francophile de l’Outaouais to operate a new French-language community radio station in Gatineau, Quebec. The new station would operate on the AM band on 1350 kHz with a daytime transmitter power of 1,000 watts and a nighttime transmitter power of 180 watts.

In February 2018, the station began on-air testing on 1350 kHz. In 2019, the station left the air permanently.

== Notes ==
AM 1350 in Gatineau was previously used by CIRA-5, a rebroadcaster of CIRA-FM in Montreal from 2012 until it left the air in 2015.
