= CHSC (Unity, Saskatchewan) =

Former radio station in Unity, Saskatchewan, Canada

Coordinates: 52.444°N 109.157°W

- Unity, Saskatchewan; Canada

Programming
- Language: English

Ownership
- Owner: Horace Stovin

History
- First air date: 1923
- Last air date: 1929

CHSC was a radio station in Unity, Saskatchewan, Canada which operated from 1923-1929.

== History ==
Horace Stovin launched the radio station in 1923 as 10AT and changed its callsign to CHSC in 1924. The frequencies CHSC operated on in Unity are unknown.

Stovin closed down CHSC in 1929 and moved to Regina to organize Plaiunsman Broadcasters and sign a management agreement contract to operate CKCK Regina for the owner, the Leader-Post newspaper.

The CHSC callsign has no relation to CHSC, a later defunct radio station in St. Catharines, Ontario.
