= Community Human Services Corporation =

The Community Human Services Corporation (CHSC) is a human service agency based in the South Oakland neighborhood of Pittsburgh, Pennsylvania. Its administrative offices are located at 374 Lawn Street, Pittsburgh, PA 15213. The mission of CHSC is:

"to enhance people’s lives and strengthen communities by providing opportunities to develop individual potential and by delivering comprehensive services that maximize the health and well-being of those it serves in South Oakland and the greater Pittsburgh area."

The agency has a focus on a variety of issues including mental health, health, housing and community supports.

== History ==
The history of Community Human Services Corporation dates back to the early 1970s. At that time, the South Oakland community was experiencing the same manner of change and decline as other inner city communities. The deaths of longtime residents and subsequent sale of their homes, coupled with an exodus to the suburbs of younger residents, created an atmosphere of instability. Rental property, with absentee landlords, burgeoned and the social fabric of the neighborhood weakened.

In 1970, residents recognized the potential of South Oakland and began a revitalization effort by going door to door to recruit neighbors to help with the task of stabilizing and strengthening the community. They asked those they contacted what they felt they could do in addition to what they felt was needed. The concept of doing was important because it exemplified the belief that people become empowered through the discovery and exercise of their strengths and abilities.

The neighbors who were involved encouraged other neighbors to come to a storefront drop-in center designed to give the residents an opportunity to get to know each other. Informal activities and socializing, along with the sharing of diverse ethnic foods and music, began.

These early efforts reflect the settlement house concept organized at the turn of the century. The purpose is to organize and create services that are comprehensive, managed often by indigenous persons, and that become occasions to mix groups of people in environments that promote celebration.

== Sleep-In for the Homeless ==
On October 17, 2008, CHSC held the first Sleep-In for the Homeless. This was a homelessness awareness event as well as a fundraiser for CHSC's homelessness programs. The event was held at the City-County building in downtown Pittsburgh. Three hundred individuals showed up for the evening's festivities, which included the "Home Is Where The Heart Is" awards. Around one hundred individuals chose to sleep overnight on the portico of the City-County Building. Sleep-Ins continue to be held each year all across the nation; the most recent took place on October 19, 2012.
