= CHCE =

Former radio station in Victoria, British Columbia

CHCE was a radio station which operated from 1923 to around 1925, in Victoria, British Columbia, Canada.

== History ==
Four young men from Victoria formed the Western Canada Radio Supply Company to build and sell radio receivers. Kenneth G. Moffatt was the manager and they opened a store on Fort Street that also housed a 5-watt transmitter. It was on the air as CHCE for a few months, broadcasting only music.

The station broadcast on 400 metres (750 kHz) with a power of only 5 watts. CHCE's licence was terminated around 1925.
