= CJWC (AM) =

Former radio station in Saskatoon, Saskatchewan

- Saskatoon, Saskatchewan; Canada
- Frequency: 910 kHz

Ownership
- Owner: A. Murphy

History
- First air date: September 28, 1925
- Last air date: 1929

Technical information
- Power: 250 watts

CJWC was a radio station that operated on 329.5 metres (910 kilohertz) in Saskatoon, Saskatchewan, Canada, from 1925-1929.

== History ==
The station began broadcasting on September 28, 1925 and was owned by the Wheaton Electric Company. It aired with 50 watts.

Shortly after the first broadcast it was decided to increase the power to 250 watts in order to reach the farmers of the area. In 1928, the station was sold to Radio Service Limited, owned by J. H. Speers. Engineer Carl O'Brien moved to the new company to continue operating the station. Less than a year later, A. Murphy bought CJWC and shut it down.
