= CKBG-FM (Nova Scotia) =

Former radio station in Middle Musquodoboit, Nova Scotia

- Middle Musquodoboit, Nova Scotia; Canada
- Frequency: 107.3 MHz
- Branding: Blue Garage Classic Mix

Programming
- Format: Rock

Ownership
- Owner: Paul Blackmore

History
- First air date: 2010
- Last air date: September 17, 2012
- Call sign meaning: Blue Garage

Technical information
- Class: LP
- ERP: 50 watts

CKBG-FM was a Canadian commercial radio station, which operated at 107.3 FM in Middle Musquodoboit, Nova Scotia. The station was called "CKBG 107.3 FM Blue Garage Classic Mix" and offered news and sports, a mix of rock, classic rock, oldies and country music.

Owned by Blue Garage Broadcasting, the station received CRTC approval on March 2, 2010.

== Closure ==
On September 17, 2012, Paul Blackmore, owner of CKBG-FM, received approval to "revoke" CKBG-FM's broadcasting licence. The licensee stated that the undertaking is no longer in operation due to economic reasons.
