= CHIM-FM-5 =

Former radio station in Red Deer, Alberta, Canada

- Red Deer, Alberta; Canada
- Frequency: 93.1 MHz

Programming
- Format: Christian music

Ownership
- Owner: Roger de Brabant; (1158556 Ontario Ltd.)

History
- First air date: 2000
- Last air date: November 30, 2012

Technical information
- Class: LP
- ERP: 50 W

Links
- Website: chimfm.com/reddeer

CHIM-FM-5 was a Canadian radio station, operating on 93.1 FM in Red Deer, Alberta, Canada. Although licensed as a rebroadcaster of CHIM-FM in Timmins, Ontario, the Red Deer station aired some unique local programming and on-air staff and had its own logo not used by any of the other CHIM stations.

CHIM-FM was given approval by the CRTC on June 7, 2000, to add a rebroadcaster at Red Deer. CHIM-FM's licence renewal application was denied by the CRTC on October 23, 2012 due to regulatory violations. As CHIM-FM-5 is licensed as a rebroadcaster of CHIM-FM, it must cease broadcasting at the end of the broadcast day on November 30, 2012.
