= CFTL (pirate radio) =

Former pirate radio station in Montreal, Quebec, Canada (1969–1971)

CFTL was an English-language pirate radio station operating in the west end of Montreal between 1969 and 1971.

CTFL broadcast on 96.7 FM (50 watts) and 6.045 MHz Shortwave (100 watts) and covered the near west end of Montreal with daily regularly scheduled programs. The station is believed to have been based in the Montreal West/Côte-Saint-Luc area. During its heyday, the station averaged 12 to 18 hours per day of broadcasting and became a popular station among the 16 to 24 demographic. It issued weekly hit charts that were available to the public. CTFL also had a listed telephone number, its own news cruiser, and sold advertising to local businesses.

CTFL's relatively long life was probably due to the fact it operated in the open and like a licensed station, except for its actual studio location. The transmitters were eventually discovered by the Canadian Department of Transport (which regulated broadcasting facilities at the time) in an elevator shaft in a Côte-Saint-Luc highrise in 1971. The studio was apparently linked via a wireless studio-transmitter link and the studio location was never officially determined, though it was believed to be in the Montreal West area.

CTFL's demise was believed to be due to a complaint filed by a licensed Montreal station, whose audience in the lucrative West End market was being impacted. (The station was first-adjacent to CKVL-FM 96.9, which became CKOI-FM in 1976.) Unconfirmed reports suggest the station was run by a small group of teens whose interest in radio broadcasting eventually grew into an actual radio station.
