= CJTK-FM =

Christian radio station in Sudbury, Ontario

Coordinates: 46°31′24″N 80°59′59″W

- Sudbury, Ontario; Canada
- Frequency: 95.5 MHz
- Branding: KFM

Programming
- Format: Christian

Ownership
- Owner: Harvest Ministries Sudbury

History
- First air date: 1997
- Call sign meaning: Christ Jesus The King

Technical information
- Class: B1
- ERP: 8,100 watts
- HAAT: 160.5 metres (527 ft)

Links
- Website: kfmradio.ca

CJTK-FM is a Canadian radio station, which airs Christian music and programming at 95.5 FM in Sudbury, Ontario. The station is owned by Harvest Ministries Sudbury, and was licensed by the CRTC in 1997. The station is branded as KFM and uses one of the current slogans as "Positive & Encouraging".

== History ==
On June 6, 1997, Curtis Belcher, the owner of Enternacom Inc., received CRTC approval to operate a new Christian music radio station in Sudbury and began broadcasting later that same year.

CJTK-FM started as a small low-power 35 watt FM radio station in Sudbury at 95.5 FM in late 1997, which CJTK became the first Christian station to be granted a power increase, and go from low-power status (35 watts), to a full power (1,400 watts).

In 2000, the station received approval to add an FM rebroadcaster at North Bay to operate on the frequency, 89.5 MHz. On February 26, 2004, the CRTC denied Eternacom's request to change CJTK-FM-1's frequency from 89.5 MHz to 99.3 MHz. In 2005, CJTK-FM applied to change North Bay's frequency from 89.5 MHz to 107.3 MHz, although when the application was approved, the station would operate at 103.5 MHz instead. Once the change took place, the CJTK-FM-1 operating at 89.5 was deleted. On December 5, 2005, CJTK received approval to add a rebroadcaster at Little Current on the frequency, 102.1 MHz and began broadcasting in September 2006. A repeater was also added in Elliot Lake on 102.5 MHz in 2008.

The Canadian Communications Foundation website reports that in 2007, Eternacom received approval to change the authorized contours of CJTK-FM by increasing effective radiated power from 1,400 watts to 8,100 watts. It's uncertain if there are any CRTC decision references regarding the power increase to 8.1 kW.

CJTK's previous logo.

In 2009, CJTK adopted its current logo and branding as KFM. Both the current and the former logo are still used on CJTK's website. The station's former brandings were known as K95.5, or just simply the K and was also used on CJTK's other repeaters.

CJTK was the play-by-play voice of the Sudbury Wolves for the 2009-2010 Ontario Hockey League season. The Sudbury Wolves games were formerly aired on CIGM.

On October 11, 2011, Eternacom Inc. applied to add a new low-power FM transmitter in Mattawa, Ontario, which will rebroadcast the programming of CJTK-FM-1 North Bay. The proposed new FM transmitter was approved on December 6, 2011, and will operate in Mattawa at 93.9 MHz. This will be Mattawa's first local FM signal in that community.

On March 30, 2015, the CRTC approved Eternacom's application to add an FM transmitter at Timmins, which will rebroadcast CJTK-FM on 105.5 MHz.

On August 16, 2018, the Commission approved an application by Eternacom Inc. (Eternacom), on behalf of Harvest Ministries Sudbury, for authority to acquire from Eternacom the assets of the English-language commercial specialty (Christian music) radio stations CJTK-FM Sudbury, CJTK FM-1 North Bay and CJTK-FM-3 Elliot Lake, Ontario, and their rebroadcasting transmitters and for broadcasting licences to continue the operation of the stations.

On November 16, 2023, Harvest Ministries Sudbury (Harvest) submitted an application to acquire from Cochrane Christian Radio, the assets of the English language low-power commercial specialty (Religious music) FM radio station CFCJ-FM in Cochrane, Ontario.

== CKBB-FM ==
In 2001, Eternacom launched a sister station, CKBB-FM, airing tourist information programming at 102.9 FM in Sudbury. The station was branded as STIR Sudbury's Tourism and Information Radio. CKBB-FM went dark in 2005. Despite the station ceasing operations, on June 5, 2006, the CRTC renewed CKBB-FM's licence from September 1, 2006, to August 31, 2013, although the station never actually relaunched.

== Transmitters ==
Rebroadcasters of CJTK-FM
City of licence	Identifier	Frequency	Power	Class	RECNet	CRTC Decision
North Bay	CJTK-FM-1	103.5 FM	800 watts	A	Query	2005-392
Little Current	CJTK-FM-2	102.1 FM	1,300 watts	A	Query	2005-577
Elliot Lake	CJTK-FM-3	102.5 FM	865 watts	A	Query	2008-105
Mattawa	CJTK-FM-4	93.9 FM	50 watts	LP	Query	2011-750
Timmins	CJTK-FM-5	105.5 FM	800 watts	A	Query	2015-114
Temiskaming Shores	CJTK-FM-6	100.9 FM	265 watts	A	Query	2017-205
Englehart	CJTK-FM-7	105.7 FM	5,100 watts	A	Query	2017-205
Sault Ste. Marie	CJTK-FM-8	106.5 FM	2,300 watts	A	Query	2017-205
Sundridge	CJTK-FM-9	98.3 FM	540 watts	A	Query	2017-205
Spring Bay	CJTK-FM-10	104.9 FM	530 watts	A	Query	2017-205
Iroquois Falls	CJTK-FM-11	105.9 FM	540 watts	A	Query	2017-205
Kapuskasing	CJTK-FM-12	88.5 FM	510 watts	A	Query	2019-314
Cochrane	CFCJ-FM	102.1 FM	37 watts	LP	Query	2024-134

The rebroadcaster in North Bay airs its own separate morning program, but simulcasts the Sudbury station the rest of the time. Eternacom also has a rebroadcaster at Elliot Lake, which also offers some local programming.

On January 5 and 6, 2017, Eternacom Inc, applied to add six new FM transmitters to rebroadcast CJTK-FM to the following communities.

- New Liskeard / Temiskaming Shores
- Englehart
- Sault Ste. Marie
- Sundridge
- Spring Bay
- Iroquois Falls

Eternacom received approval to add the new FM transmitters on June 19, 2017. Most of these new transmitters had already signed on the air in late 2017 and 2018. Eternacom, the owners of CJTK-FM plans to expand up to 20 stations by 2020.

On May 22, 2019, Harvest Ministries Sudbury applied to add a new FM transmitter to rebroadcast CJTK-FM at Kapuskasing on the frequency of 88.5 MHz. This application was approved by the CRTC on September 4, 2019.

On June 18, 2024, the CRTC approved an application by Harvest Ministries Sudbury (Harvest) to change the ownership and control of the English-language low-power commercial specialty (Religious music) FM radio station CFCJ-FM at 102.1 MHz Cochrane, Ontario, through the acquisition of the assets.

On February 23, 2026, Harvest Ministries Sudbury applied to add a new FM transmitter at Kirkland Lake, Ontario to operate on the frequency of 106.3 MHz. This application is pending CRTC approval. The application was approved on August 10, 2026.

== See also ==
- Christian radio
