= CHIM-FM =

Radio station in Timmins, Ontario

Coordinates: 48.45028°N 81.30074°W

CHIM
- Timmins, Ontario; Canada
- Broadcast area: Northern Ontario
- Frequency: 1710 kHz

Programming
- Format: Christian music

Ownership
- Owner: Roger de Brabant; (1158556 Ontario Ltd.)

History
- First air date: April 7, 1996
- Former frequencies: 102.3 MHz
- Call sign meaning: See Him

Technical information
- Class: A1
- ERP: 84 watts

Links
- Website: chimfm.com

CHIM is a Canadian radio station, which previously broadcast Christian music on 102.3 FM in Timmins, Ontario. The station also currently broadcasts on 1710 AM.

The station began testing its signal on 102.3 MHz on December 24, 1995, and officially signed on April 7, 1996. The station has expanded through a network of rebroadcast transmitters in Northern Ontario. CHIM-FM also has a rebroadcaster in Red Deer, Alberta, CHIM-FM-5, which originates some of its own programming.

Its call sign was pronounced, on air, as See Him.

== Programming ==
The station's best-known program was the MAD Christian Radio Show, a Christian rock show hosted by Kristen McNulty, which originally started as a show on CHIM. Today, it is syndicated to Christian radio stations across Canada and internationally.

Other programming aired on the station includes Charles Stanley's In Touch and Tristan Emmanuel's No Apologies.

== Transmitters ==
Rebroadcasters of CHIM-FM
City of licence	Identifier	Frequency	Power	Class	RECNet
Chapleau	CHIM-FM-8	92.7 FM	1 watt	LP	Query
Elliot Lake	CHIM-FM-7	92.5 FM	1 watt	LP	Query
Iroquois Falls	CHIM-FM-2	102.7 FM	2 watts	LP	Query
Kapuskasing	CHIM-FM-10	92.3 FM	2 watts	LP	Query
Kirkland Lake	CHIM-FM-3	99.1 FM	2 watts	LP	Query
North Bay	CHIM-FM-1	92.5 FM	50 watts	LP	Query
Sault Ste. Marie	CHIM-FM-6	97.3 FM	50 watts	LP	Query
Temiskaming Shores	CHIM-FM-4	103.5 FM	1 watt	LP	Query
Wawa	CHIM-FM-9	92.5 FM	1 watt	LP	Query

CHIM-FM-5 in Red Deer, Alberta, was licensed as a repeater of CHIM, but broadcast some local programming for the Red Deer area. The transmitter operated on 93.1 FM. CHIM-FM-5 would go dark in November 2012 with the revocation of CHIM's licenses.

In 2000, CHIM's application to add a transmitter in Toronto on 106.3 MHz was denied. In 2001, CHIM's application to add a transmitter in Vancouver, British Columbia, on 92.9 MHz was denied. CHIM's application to add a transmitter at 102.3 MHz in Cochrane was denied as well in 2008. An unrelated radio station, CFCJ-FM owned by Cochrane Christian Radio to operate a new English language Christian radio station at Cochrane on 102.1 MHz received CRTC approval on April 18, 2011.

The station's licence renewal application was denied by the CRTC on October 23, 2012, due to regulatory violations. As a result, CHIM-FM was ordered to cease broadcasting Christian music by the end of the broadcast day on November 30, 2012. CHIM was relicensed as Information radio by Industry Canada. CHIM remains active via an online stream on their website, as well as transmitting on 1710 AM.

By September 2014, CHIM returned to terrestrial radio in Timmins on 1710 kHz. In 2017, CHIM plans to expand its Christian radio service to Sudbury (1600 AM), Parry Sound, Orillia, Toronto (VFU545 101.7), Calgary, Edmonton, and Vancouver. CHIM Radio is also coming to Sudbury on 101.7 FM with a Christian music format.

== Info Radio ==
CHIM's owner, Roger de Brabant, also operates a number of low-powered tourist information radio stations branded as Info Radio. These stations also use the "Canada's Good News Network", or "Part of the Good News Network" slogan on air sometimes, but do not share the CHIM network's Christian programming. These stations were unaffected by the CRTC decision, and remain on air.

Rebroadcasters of Info Radio
City of licence	Identifier	Frequency	Power	Class	RECNet	CRTC Decision
Hearst	VF2597	95.5	2 watts	LP	Query	
Smooth Rock Falls	VF2619	101.9	2 watts	LP	Query	
Sudbury	CKJC-FM	101.7	50 watts	LP	Query	
Temagami	CJTI-FM	92.1	2 watts	LP	Query	
Timmins	CHTI-FM	102.3	32 watts	LP	Query	2000-103

According to the CHIM website, Hearst was listed as CFCL-FM 95.5 and Smooth Rock Falls CKSO-FM 101.9.

On April 17, 2000, Roger de Brabant, received an approval from the CRTC to operate a low-power tourist information FM radio station on 101.5 MHz. The call sign was CHTI-FM and is unknown when the station changed frequencies to 102.3 MHz.

In 2017, CHTI launched a new website CHTI Radio Network.
