= Pelmorex Radio Network =

Former radio network in northern Ontario, Canada

The Pelmorex Radio Network was a system of Canadian radio stations in Northern Ontario, owned and operated by Pelmorex.

== History ==
In 1989, Pierre Morrissette founded his own communications company, Pelmorex Media Inc., and acquired several French and English-language radio stations that were serving various small and medium-size markets in northern Ontario. Pelmorex acquired the first stations from Mid-Canada Radio in 1990. In 1991, the company created a regional radio network to transmit programs originating from Sudbury to its pelmorex-owned radio stations in northeastern Ontario and the Ottawa Valley.

In 1992, Pelmorex also entered into one of Canada's first local management agreements, taking over day-to-day management, but not formal ownership, of Telemedia's CHAS-FM in Sault Ste. Marie.

Pelmorex became controversial as one of the first radio broadcast groups in Canada to centralize its operations as a cost-saving measure. Almost all local programming on the stations was discontinued, with only local morning shows remaining. This process began slowly in 1991 with a midday program after a satellite uplink was installed at the CHNO-CJMX studios in Sudbury. By 1994, most of the stations' programming was delivered by satellite from a facility in Mississauga, and the stations were reduced to storefronts with just a few staff members.

The controversy came to a head in 1995, when Environment Canada issued a severe weather warning in Sudbury during the Heat Wave of 1995 Derecho Series. The warning, issued barely ten minutes after the stations had switched to the central programming feed, was never broadcast on any of Pelmorex's three stations in the city. Pelmorex, ironically, also owned Canada's Weather Network.

Scott Jackson, a former program director with the company, has written on his website that Pelmorex often neglected necessary equipment and technology upgrades at the stations, and that the company had him simultaneously serve as program director of both the Sudbury and North Bay clusters, spending half of his working week in each city.

Pelmorex subsequently sold CKNR, CJNR and CKNS to North Channel Broadcasting in 1996. All three stations were merged by North Channel into a new FM station on 94.1 MHz in 1997, known as CKNR.

Pelmorex also converted CHVR Pembroke, CHVR-1 Renfrew and CHVR-2 Arnprior to the FM band in 1996. All three stations were merged into a new single FM station on 96.7 MHz, known as CHVR-FM. Pelmorex converted CHUR North Bay to the FM band in 1997.

In 1997 and 1998, staff at the stations in Sudbury were involved in a four-month strike, during which all programming on the stations aired exclusively from the Mississauga facility.

In 1998, after a change in CRTC ownership rules, Pelmorex sold CHUR, CHVR, CJMX in Sudbury and CJQM in Sault Ste. Marie to Telemedia. (Telemedia had previously been limited to one station on each of the AM and FM bands in each market; with the change, it could acquire two in one band and one in the other, so it added second FMs to its existing AM/FM combos in each city.)

The company (Pelmorex) announced in 1998, that it wants to exit the radio business to focus on its multimedia weather-related information services.

Pelmorex sold the remaining stations to Haliburton Broadcasting Group in 1999. The company had received CRTC approval to convert CHNO, CHYC, CKOY, CHYK, CHOH and CKAP to the FM band as well, although the conversions were still in progress when the stations were sold to Haliburton.

== Stations ==
Community	Call Sign	Old Frequency	Current Frequency	Notes
Blind River	CJNR	AM 730	FM 94.1	Sold to North Channel Broadcasting in 1996.
Elliot Lake	CKNR	AM 1340	FM 94.1	Sold to North Channel Broadcasting in 1996.
Espanola	CKNS	AM 930	FM 94.1	Sold to North Channel Broadcasting in 1996.
Hearst	CHOH	AM 1340	FM 92.9	Sold to Haliburton Broadcasting Group in 1999.
Kapuskasing	CKAP	AM 580	FM 100.9	Sold to Haliburton Broadcasting Group in 1999.
Kapuskasing	CHYK	AM 1230	FM 93.7	Sold to Haliburton Broadcasting Group in 1999.
North Bay	CHUR	AM 840	FM 100.5	Moved to FM in 1996, sold to Telemedia in 1998.
Pembroke	CHVR	AM 1350	FM 96.7	Moved to FM in 1996, sold to Telemedia in 1998.
Sault Ste. Marie	CKCY	AM 920	defunct	Ceased broadcasting in 1992.
Sault Ste. Marie	CJQM	FM 104.3	FM 104.3	Sold to Telemedia in 1998.
Sudbury	CHNO	AM 550	FM 103.9	Sold to Haliburton Broadcasting Group in 1999.
Sudbury	CHYC	AM 900	FM 98.9	Sold to Haliburton Broadcasting Group in 1999.
Sudbury	CJMX	FM 105.3	FM 105.3	Sold to Telemedia in 1998.
Timmins	CKOY	AM 620	FM 104.1	Sold to Haliburton Broadcasting Group in 1999.
Wawa	CJWA	AM 1240	FM 107.1	Ceased broadcasting in 1996. Subsequently, relaunched by new owners in 1998.
