= CKNS (AM) =

Former radio station in Espanola, Ontario

Semi-satellite of CKNR Elliot Lake

Espanola, Ontario; Canada
- Frequency: 930 kHz

Ownership
- Owner: North Channel Broadcasters

History
- First air date: October 2, 1976
- Last air date: 1997

Technical information
- Power: 10,000 watts

CKNS was a former radio station which operated on 930 kHz (AM) in Espanola, Ontario, Canada.

== History ==
On February 6, 1976, Algonquin Radio-TV Co. Ltd. was given approval to operate a new AM station at Espanola. It would broadcast on 930 kHz with a power of 10,000 watts. CKNS began broadcasting at 930 kHz on October 2, 1976.

Algonquin Radio-TV president Carmen Greco cut the ribbon to launch CKNS Radio on the air. Lending a hand for the opening ribbon cutting ceremonies was Espanola's Mayor Leo Foucault and Sudbury's Regional Chairman, Joe Fabbro. The station was a semi-satellite of CKNR in Elliot Lake which began broadcasting in 1967. The "NS" in the CKNS call sign: North Shore.

The original studios of CKNS were located on Station Road in Espanola and later moved to its final address at 46 Mead Boulevard. CKNS operated at 930 kHz with 10,000 watts non-directionally during the day and had a directional pattern at night, using four 225 foot towers. CKNS Espanola was the strongest of the three stations; Both CKNR Elliot Lake (originating station) and CJNR Blind River operated with a lower power of 1,000 watts day and night.

In the mid-1980s, Mid-Canada Communications was approved by the CRTC to acquire CKNS from Huron Broadcasting Limited.

In 1986 CKNS received approval to disaffiliate from the CBC radio network, which is now served by CBCE-FM out of Little Current. In 1990, the Pelmorex Radio Network received approval to acquire CKNS from Mid-Canada Communications. In 1996, CKNS and its sister stations CKNR and CJNR were sold to North Channel Broadcasters, which established the contemporary CKNR-FM and shut down all three AM signals.
