= CJNR (AM) =

Former radio station in Blind River, Ontario

Semi-satellite of CKNR in Elliot Lake

Blind River, Ontario; Canada
- Frequency: 730 kHz

Ownership
- Owner: North Channel Broadcasters

History
- First air date: March 1, 1958
- Last air date: 1997
- Call sign meaning: Nash Radio, original owner

CJNR was a radio station which operated at 730 kHz in Blind River, Ontario, Canada.

== History ==
In late 1957 Thomas C. Nash (owner of Nash Radio & TV Broadcasting Co.) received a licence for an AM station at Blind River, which began operating at 730 kHz on March 1, 1958. CJNR would have its transmitter in Blind River, along with studios located in Elliot Lake. The callsign meaning for CJNR is "Nash Radio & TV Broadcasting Co." or "North Shore".

In the 1960s or early 1970s the owner of CKNR Elliot Lake purchased CJNR. It would become a semi-satellite of CKNR which began broadcasting in 1967. The owner was or would be known as Algonquin Radio-TV Ltd. (CKCY Sault Ste. Marie).

In the mid-1980s Mid-Canada Communications was approved by the CRTC to acquire CJNR from Huron Broadcasting Limited.

In 1986 CJNR received approval to disaffiliate from the CBC radio network, which is now served by CBCE-FM out of Little Current. In 1990, the Pelmorex Radio Network received approval to acquire CJNR from Mid-Canada Communications. In 1996, CJNR and its sister stations CKNR and CKNS were sold to North Channel Broadcasters, which established the contemporary CKNR-FM and shut down all three AM signals.
