= CHSC (AM) =

- St. Catharines, Ontario; Canada
- Broadcast area: Niagara Region, Greater Toronto Area
- Frequency: 1220 kHz
- Branding: 1220 CHSC / Radio Uno

Programming
- Format: adult contemporary and Italian

Ownership
- Owner: Pellpropco Inc.

History
- First air date: 1967
- Last air date: October 2, 2010

Technical information
- Licensing authority: CRTC
- Class: B
- Power: 10,000 watts (unlimited)

CHSC was an radio station located in St. Catharines, Ontario, Canada. CHSC broadcast both daytime and nighttime with a radiated power of 10,000 watts at 1220 AM. The signal pushed mainly north and west, but was on a reduced pattern in both easterly and southerly directions due to interference with a co-channel station in Cleveland (WHKW) and with AM 1230 WECK (Cheektowaga), forty miles (64 km) to the east. CHSC could routinely be heard as far north as parts of cottage country and west beyond Guelph.

CHSC aired a mix of adult contemporary and oldies along with a bit of country typically attracting audiences ages 30 and up, both male and female. CHSC played a mix of 50 per cent gold and 50 per cent current/recurrent of which 45 per cent on average consisted of Canadian content during the broadcast week of Sunday to Saturday.

Listeners could also find interviews in both English and Italian. The station's regular English programming was branded as 1220 CHSC, and its Italian programming was branded as Radio Uno.

On July 30, 2010, the Canadian Radio-television and Telecommunications Commission (CRTC) denied the station's application for renewal. As of 2011, the station broadcast a full-time Italian language format via Internet streaming and marketed toward the Greater Toronto Area, but was not licensed to relaunch on the AM band. The internet radio stream was subsequently discontinued.

In 2020, a new station, CFAJ, launched in St. Catharines on 1220 AM.

== History ==
CHSC was launched in 1967 by Radio Station CHSC Ltd., which also launched CHSC-FM at the same time. The station was acquired by Coultis Broadcasting in 1990.

In 1997, the station entered into a local marketing agreement with CJRN and CKEY in Niagara Falls. The station subsequently applied to move to FM in 2001, but withdrew the application.

Coultis went into receivership in 2002, and the station was acquired by Pellpropco Inc.

== Programming ==
In later years, CHSC's program schedule consisted of English and Italian-language spoken word and music programming.

English-language programming ran during the week, interspersed with Italian-language music in the afternoons. CHSC was one of the last AM stations remaining in Canada that played current charted music. The music was 50% gold and 50% current-recurrent with above the average Canadian content required. The CRTC only required CHSC to play 35 per cent Canadian content over the course of the broadcast week (Sunday to Saturday) but CHSC averaged about 45% during the broadcast week.

Spoken word programming consisted largely of news updates at the top of each hour from 6 a.m. to 6 p.m. on weekdays, and the It's Your Call Sports Show on Monday nights. Italian-language programming branded as Radio Uno began at 9 a.m. Saturdays and ran until 6 a.m. Monday when programming reverted to English.

CHSC also experimented with other third-language programming. During about three months of 2008 South-Asian Dhoom (Hindu music and chat) aired weekdays in the last couple of hours before noon and at the supper hour for about three hours. Caribbean Connection, a mix of soca music and English-language chat aired on Saturdays and Sundays during the supper hour for three hours on Saturday and two hours on Sunday. Both South-Asian Dhoom and Caribbean Connection were eventually cancelled.

== 2008 problems ==
In the summer 2008, the Queenston Street building, which housed CHSC's studio and offices since its founding, were seized by bailiffs and all of the contents were auctioned off. This was allegedly due either to large sums of unpaid rent and taxes; to physical deterioration, according to documents filed by the station owner with the CRTC; or both.

The CRTC announced a January 2009 hearing to inquire into format violations, missing financial statements, logger tapes, the loss of the studio, and the station's allegedly being operated from Woodbridge, a suburb of Toronto, rather than St. Catharines. CHSC's web site is a mere welcome message and a link to the online streaming. On June 30, 2009, the CRTC issued a number of mandatory orders to Pellpropco regarding the management of the station.

== 2010 shutdown ==
On July 30, 2010, the CRTC issued a decision that it would not renew the station's license, requiring the station to cease broadcasting at the end of the broadcast day of August 31. The CRTC cited numerous failures to comply with regulations and with commission orders, and the doubtfulness of the station management's promises to comply in the future. According to CRTC media relations, Pellpropco filed a motion on August 25 with the Federal Court of Canada, and a stay was issued on August 31. This allowed CHSC to remain on the air, legally, pending a decision by that court. CHSC was noted on-air the afternoon of September 1 with regular programming (Radio Uno at that time). The court declined to allow an appeal on September 30, effectively putting an end to the station for good; by October 2, CHSC was off the air.

In January 2015, the former CHSC studios at 36 Queenston Street in St. Catharines was demolished; its land will be used for a four-storey apartment building.
