= CHVR-FM =

Radio station in Pembroke, Ontario

Coordinates: 45.82806°N 77.09708°W

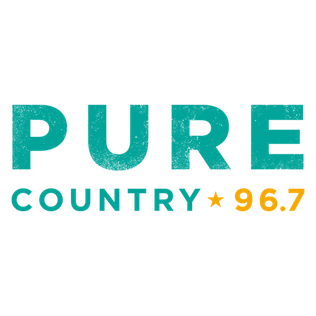
- Pembroke, Ontario; Canada
- Frequency: 96.7 MHz
- Branding: Pure Country 96.7

Programming
- Format: Country
- Affiliations: Premiere Networks

Ownership
- Owner: Bell Media

History
- First air date: July 1, 1942
- Former call signs: CHOV (1942–1977); CHRO (1977–1990); CHVR (1990–1996)
- Former frequencies: 1340 kHz (1942–1948); 1350 kHz (1948–1996)
- Call sign meaning: Valley Radio

Technical information
- Class: C1
- ERP: 100,000 watts
- HAAT: 157.5 metres (517 ft)

Links
- Webcast: Listen Live
- Website: iheartradio.ca/purecountry/pembroke

CHVR-FM is a Canadian radio station, broadcasting at 96.7 FM in Pembroke, Ontario. The station airs a country format branded as Pure Country 96.7. Prior to May 28, 2019, it was branded Star 96.7.

== History ==
The station was originally launched on July 1, 1942 as AM 1340 CHOV by Ottawa Valley Broadcasting. In the late 1940s CHOV moved to AM 1350. In 1961, Ottawa Valley also launched CHOV-TV. Workers at CHOV unionized and labour disputes at the channel led to management closing the station and selling it to new owners. The television station was purchased by J. Conrad Lavigne in 1977, adopting the callsign CHRO and becoming part of the MCTV system in 1980. In 1981, Mid-Canada Communications also purchased the radio station; it subsequently adopted the CHRO callsign as well.

In 1990, the MCTV television stations were sold to Baton Broadcasting and the radio stations were sold to Pelmorex. With the TV and radio stations now under different ownership again, the radio station adopted its current CHVR callsign. In 1991, Pelmorex also acquired CKOA in Arnprior and CKOB in Renfrew, both of which were converted to rebroadcasters of CHVR, known as CHVR-1 Renfrew and CHVR-2 Arnprior.

CHVR moved to its current frequency in 1996. The station was branded as Star 96.7 with a new country music format. Due to its signal strength, the Renfrew and Arnprior AM rebroadcasters were both discontinued. Prior to the change, the CBC, known as CBCD, had occupied 96.7 FM in Pembroke and changed to 92.5 FM. The 1350 allocation would relocate to Gatineau, Quebec, where it was used for a local transmitter for Montreal's CIRA-FM from 2009 to 2015.

The station was acquired by Telemedia in 1998, and Telemedia was in turn bought out by Standard Broadcasting in 2002.

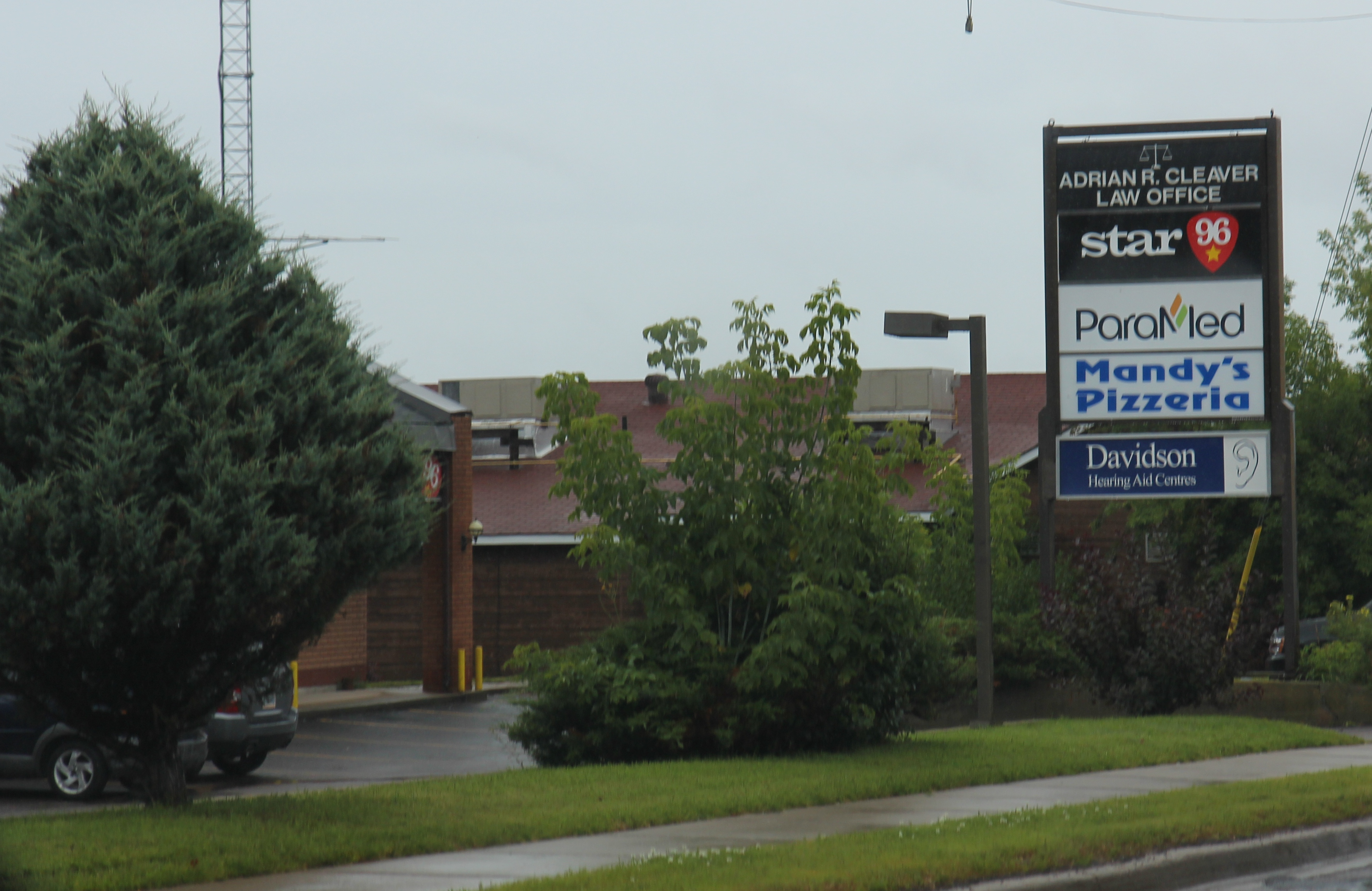
Star 96 studios in 2014

In 2005 and 2006, Standard Broadcasting carried out a series of downsizing measures at CHVR-FM, eliminating the station's traffic and copy departments (centralizing them at CKQB-FM Ottawa) and downsizing the station's newsroom to one full-time and one part-time staffer.

In October 2007, Astral Media acquired Standard Broadcasting's terrestrial radio and television assets, including CHVR.

In July 2013, CHVR-FM was acquired by Bell Media, a subsidiary of Bell Canada (the company which already owns CTV and local CTV Two outlet CHRO-TV) as a result of a buyout of Astral Media.

On May 28, 2019, as part of a country-wide format reorganization by Bell, CHVR rebranded as Pure Country 96.7.
