= CKNR-FM =

Radio station in Elliot Lake, Ontario

Coordinates: 45°55′52″N 81°59′13″W

- Elliot Lake, Ontario; Canada
- Broadcast area: Algoma District, Little Current, Manitoulin Island
- Frequency: 94.1 MHz
- Branding: 94.1 Moose FM

Programming
- Language: English
- Format: Adult contemporary
- Affiliations: Moose FM

Ownership
- Owner: Vista Broadcast Group

History
- First air date: 1967
- Former call signs: CKNR (1967-March 3, 1997)
- Former frequencies: 1340 kHz (1967–1997)

Technical information
- Class: C1
- ERP: 90 kW
- HAAT: 193 metres (633 ft)
- Repeater: CKNR-FM-1 98.7 Elliot Lake

Links
- Webcast: Listen Live
- Website: myalgomamanitoulinnow.com

CKNR-FM is a Canadian radio station, which broadcasts an adult contemporary format at 94.1 MHz in Elliot Lake, Ontario. The station uses the on-air brand 94.1 Moose FM.

== History ==
The station first aired in 1967 at 1340 AM, and was owned by Algonquin Broadcasting. CKNR had two sister stations, CKNS in Espanola (established in 1976) and CJNR in Blind River (actually the oldest of the three, first established in 1958). Huron Broadcasting acquired the stations in 1976.

In 1986, CJNR and CKNS were given approval to amend their broadcasting licenses, by deleting the condition of license which required these stations to operate as affiliates of the CBC's English-language AM radio network.

All three stations became part of Mid-Canada Radio in 1986, and were subsequently sold to the Pelmorex Radio Network in 1990.

On November 15, 1990, CKNR was given permission to disaffiliate from the CBC as the Elliot Lake area was now served by the Corporation's CBEC-FM.

On December 13, 1984, the CRTC approved a number of applications for a number of AM radio stations across Ontario including CKNR Elliot Lake to increase their nighttime power from 250 watts to 1,000 watts.

During the years on the AM band, both CKNR AM 1340 Elliot Lake (the originating station) and CJNR AM 730 Blind River operated at a power of 1,000 watts day and night, while CKNS AM 930 Espanola operated at 10,000 watts day and night making CKNS the strongest signal of the three.

In the 1980s and 1990s, CKNR and its stations CJNR and CKNS were branded as NR Radio and North Shore Radio.

North Channel Broadcasting acquired the stations from Pelmorex in 1996, and converted CKNR to 94.1 MHz on March 3, 1997 with a transmitter on Manitoulin Island. Due to the station's signal strength (it can be heard as far as Sudbury and into Michigan's eastern Upper Peninsula), the CJNR and CKNS signals were both discontinued. After the move to 94.1 FM, the station transmitted in mono and aired a mix of classic hits, oldies, and adult contemporary with some current music. Prior to and after CKNR's move to FM, the station had aired the Toronto Blue Jays baseball games. The station identified itself as just simply CKNR FM 94.1.

North Channel subsequently sold CKNR to Haliburton Broadcasting Group in 2004, a sale which reunited CKNR with many of its former sister stations in the Pelmorex Radio Network.

After Haliburton purchased CKNR-FM, the station rebranded as 94.1 Moose FM with adult contemporary, variety music and switched to FM stereo.

On April 23, 2012, Vista Broadcast Group, which owns a number of radio stations in western Canada, announced a deal to acquire Haliburton Broadcasting, in cooperation with Westerkirk Capital. The transaction was approved by the CRTC on October 19, 2012.

== Transmitters ==
Although officially licensed to Elliot Lake, the primary transmitter is located closer to Little Current (approximately 80 km to the southeast of the city), and parts of the city of Elliot Lake itself consequently do not receive an adequate signal on the 94.1 frequency. On July 9, 2007, CKNR applied to re-broadcast their FM signal at 98.7 MHz to serve the population of Elliot Lake and received CRTC approval on August 24, 2007.

Rebroadcasters of CKNR-FM
City of licence	Identifier	Frequency	Power	Class	RECNet
Elliot Lake	CKNR-FM-1	98.7 FM	50 watts	LP	Query
