= CJQM-FM =

Radio station in Sault Ste. Marie, Ontario

- Sault Ste. Marie, Ontario; Canada
- Broadcast area: Algoma District; Chippewa County, Michigan
- Frequency: 104.3 MHz
- Branding: 104.3 The Fox

Programming
- Format: Mainstream rock

Ownership
- Owner: Rogers Radio; (Rogers Media, Inc.)
- Sister stations: CHAS-FM

History
- First air date: May 13, 1965
- Former call signs: CKCY-FM (1965–1985)

Technical information
- Licensing authority: CRTC
- Class: C
- ERP: 100,000 watts
- HAAT: 150 metres (490 ft)
- Transmitter coordinates: 46°35′40″N 84°21′00″W

Links
- Webcast: Listen Live
- Website: 1043thefox.com

CJQM-FM (104.3 FM, "104.3 The Fox") is a radio station in Sault Ste. Marie, Ontario. Owned by Rogers Sports & Media, it broadcasts a mainstream rock format.

With 100,000 watts of power, CJQM's signal is one of the strongest in the Sault Ste. Marie area; it can be heard northward to Montreal River, southward to Mackinaw City, and at times as far away as Gaylord.

== History ==
The station was launched on May 13, 1965 as CKCY-FM by Algonquin Broadcasting, the owners of the city's CKCY-AM. In 1976, both stations were acquired by Huron Broadcasting, who also launched CKCY-TV in 1978. Huron subsequently sold the radio stations to a new business consortium, CKCY 920 Ltd., in 1985. The station adopted its current callsign that year, as well as its Q104 branding. CKCY 920 Ltd. was subsequently acquired by Mid-Canada Radio in 1988, and Mid-Canada in turn was acquired by the Pelmorex Radio Network in 1990.

Due to the economic circumstances of the Sault Ste. Marie market, with competition from stations in Sault Ste. Marie, Michigan severely curtailing the profitability of the Ontario stations, Pelmorex shut down CKCY in 1992. The company then entered into a local management agreement with Telemedia, taking over management of that company's CHAS-FM and making CHAS and CJQM sister stations, an arrangement that continues to this day. Telemedia subsequently acquired the Pelmorex group in 1999.

Telemedia was acquired by Standard Broadcasting in 2002, with Standard selling both CJQM and CHAS to their current owner, Rogers Media, the same year. On June 28, 2013, the station rebranded as Country 104.3 as part of a standardization by Rogers' country stations.

After more than 30 years, Jeff McNeice retired and signed off at CJQM in 2021. He became the last local radio morning show host on the Canadian side of the St.Mary's River. All local programming had been phased out earlier, including locally produced news and sports, in favour of voice-tracked content from other Rogers country stations.

On January 9, 2025, the station flipped from country to rock as 104.3 The Fox.

== Former logos ==
CJQM-FM's former logo under the "Q104" branding until 2013

Country 104.3 used from 2013 to 2025
