= Blind River, Ontario =

Blind River
- Town (single-tier)
- Town of Blind River
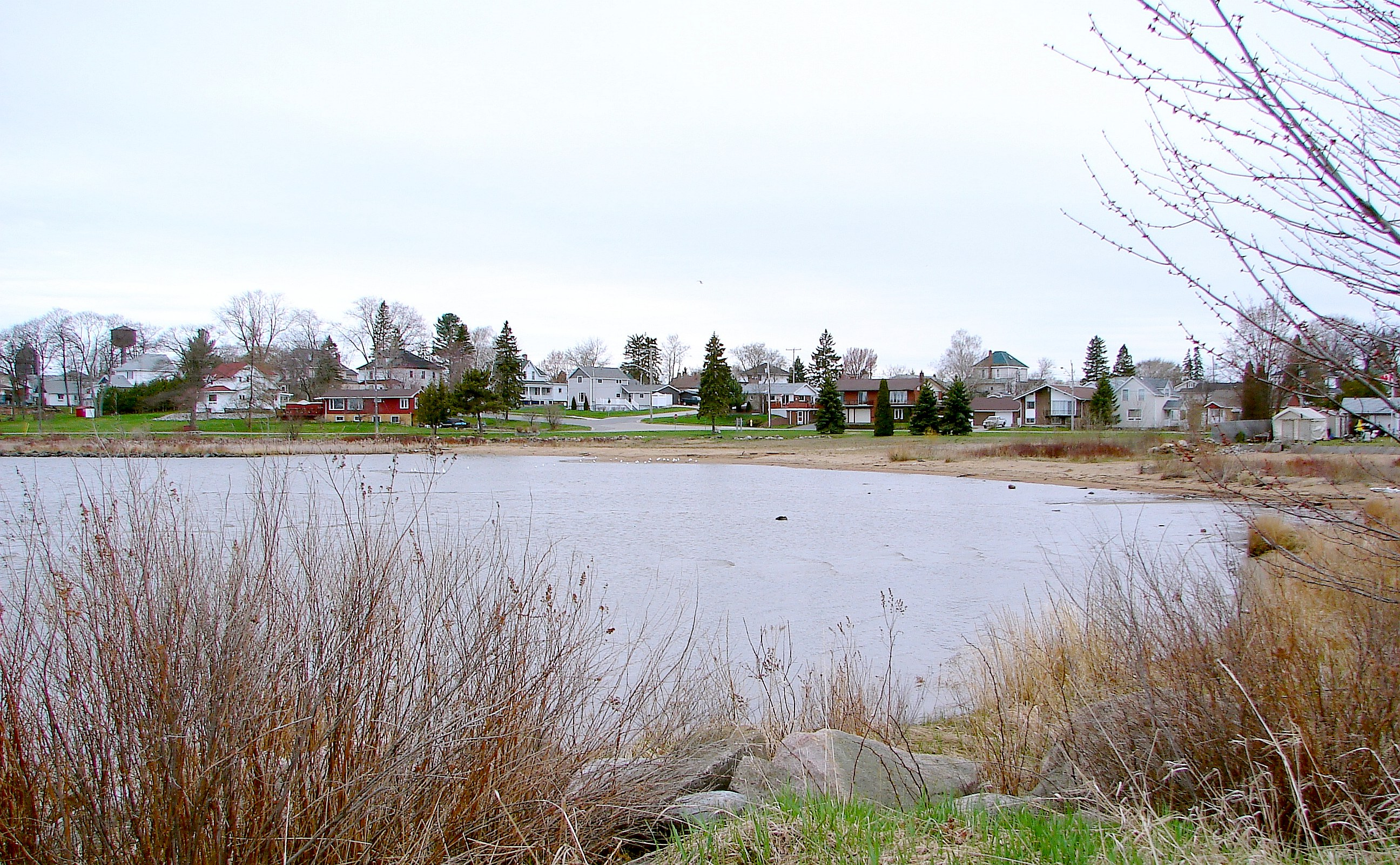
- Blind River shoreline

- Location within Ontario
- Coordinates: 46°11′N 82°57′W
- Country: Canada
- Province: Ontario
- District: Algoma
- Founded: 1850s
- Incorporated: 1906

Government
  - Type: Town
  - Mayor: Sally Hagman
  - MP: Terry Sheehan (Liberal)
  - MPP: Bill Rosenberg (PC)

Area
  - Land: 513.98 km^{2} (198.45 sq mi)

Population (2021)
  - Total: 3,422
  - Density: 6.7/km^{2} (17/sq mi)
- Time zone: UTC−5 (EST)
  - Summer (DST): UTC−4 (EDT)
- Area code: 705
- Website: www.blindriver.ca

Blind River is a town situated on the North Channel of Lake Huron in the Algoma District, Ontario, Canada. The town, named after the nearby Blind River, celebrated its centennial in 2006.

== History ==
French explorers discovered the North Channel and made it a renowned voyageur route. Fur traders, loggers and miners followed to seek natural resources. A fur trading post was established by the North West Company in 1789 at the mouth of the Mississagi River. When the fur trade slowed about 1820, the Hudson's Bay Company purchased the North West Company. A number of trappers settled along the rivers flowing into Lake Huron. One of the rivers, just three miles (4.8 km) east of the Mississagi mouth, was called Penewobecong, which translates to "smooth rock or sloping". The voyageurs named the river the Blind River because the mouth was not easily visible along the canoe route. The name Blind River was adopted by the settlement that grew at the mouth of the river. Blind River's post office was established in 1877.

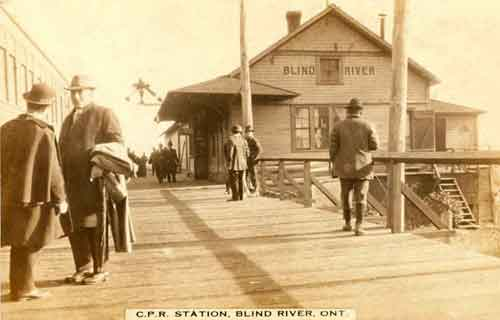
The Canadian Pacific Railway station in Blind River, c. 1910.

The logging industry developed because of the accessibility of timber along the Blind River and Mississagi watersheds. The industry was spurred by a copper discovery in the mid-19th century in Bruce Mines. In 1853, the first sawmill was built beside the mouth of the Blind River at the current site of the Old Mill Motel. The protected estuary of the east arm of the Blind River as well as the deep water offshore offered a good location for the mill. The sawmill provided timber and planks for the copper mine. The Canadian Pacific Railway arrived in Blind River in 1888 when its Algoma Branch was extended westward from Algoma Mills to Sault Ste. Marie.

By 1906, when Blind River had been incorporated as a town, a second larger sawmill had been erected on the west arm of the Blind River. Today the west arm is the location of the Blind River Marine Park. In 1929, the Carpenter Hixon Company built a state-of-the-art pine sawmill producing 89 million board feet (210,000 m^{3}) of lumber in its first year. Through boom and bust the mill survived under the name McFadden Lumber Company for over forty years as the largest white pine sawmill east of the Rocky Mountains, with an annual capacity of 120 million board feet (280,000 m^{3}) of lumber, an output never reached in actual production.. The Great Mississagi Fire of 1948 led to a depletion of timber, difficult economic conditions and the eventual closing of the mill in 1969. The lumber history is commemorated in the Timber Village Museum.

In 1955, uranium was discovered near Blind River. The first uranium mine began operation as the Pronto Mine in Algoma Mills. Although its life was short-lived, its significance was that it led to the discovery of the entire Blind River-Elliot Lake uranium mining camp. In 1983 a uranium refinery was built just west of Blind River. This uranium refinery is owned and operated by the Cameco Corporation, which processes uranium concentrates from all over the world into uranium trioxide.

The town of Blind River made headlines in 1991 for a double homicide that occurred at the local rest stop off the Trans-Canada Highway. On June 28, 1991, an unknown assailant shot an elderly couple from Lindsay, Ontario, Gord McAllister, 62, and his wife Jackie, 59, and 29-year-old Brian Major. The killer gained entry into the McAllisters' motor home by posing as a police officer. Jackie McAllister and Brian Major died of their wounds. The case was profiled in 1993 on NBC-TV's Unsolved Mysteries. No one has ever been charged in the homicides, but a suspect, Ronald Glenn West (a former Toronto police officer convicted of two rape-murders in Toronto in 1970 for which he is currently serving two life sentences, and of a series of robbery-assaults in Sault Ste. Marie in 1995), was under suspicion. Gord McAllister died on February 14, 2012.

Until 1997, Blind River had its own radio station, CJNR-AM 730. In 1997, the station was absorbed into the new CKNR-FM, based in Elliot Lake.

== Demographics ==
In the 2021 Census of Population conducted by Statistics Canada, Blind River had a population of 3,422 living in 1,600 of its 2,207 total private dwellings, a change of −1.4% from its 2016 population of 3,472. With a land area of 513.98 km^{2} (198.45 sq mi), it had a population density of 6.7/km^{2} (17.2/sq mi) in 2021.

Canada census – Blind River community profile

	2021	2016	2011
Population	3,422 (-1.4% from 2016)	3,472 (−0.44% from 2011)	3,549 (−6.1% from 2006)
Land area	513.98 km^{2} (198.45 sq mi)	526.46 km^{2} (203.27 sq mi)	526.46 km^{2} (203.27 sq mi)
Population density	6.7/km^{2} (17/sq mi)	6.6/km^{2} (17/sq mi)	6.7/km^{2} (17/sq mi)
Median age	52.8 (M: 51.2, F: 53.6)	51.8 (M: 51.7, F: 51.8)
Private dwellings	2,207 (total) 1,600 (occupied)	2,219 (total)	2,248 (total)
Median household income	$66,500	$53,222

References: 2021 2016 2011

Historical census populations – Blind River, Ontario

Year	Pop.	±%
1901	2,656	—
1911	2,558	−3.7%
1921	1,843	−28.0%
1931	2,805	+52.2%
1941	2,619	−6.6%
1951	2,512	−4.1%
1956	3,633	+44.6%

Year	Pop.	±%
1961	4,093	+12.7%
1966	3,617	−11.6%
1971	3,450	−4.6%
1976	3,142	−8.9%
1981	3,444	+9.6%
1986	3,553	+3.2%
1991	3,355	−5.6%

Year	Pop.	±%
1996	3,152	−6.1%
2001	3,969	+25.9%
2006	3,780	−4.8%
2011	3,549	−6.1%
2016	3,472	−2.2%
2021	3,422	−1.4%

Population counts are not adjusted for boundary changes.
Source: Statistics Canada

== Economy ==
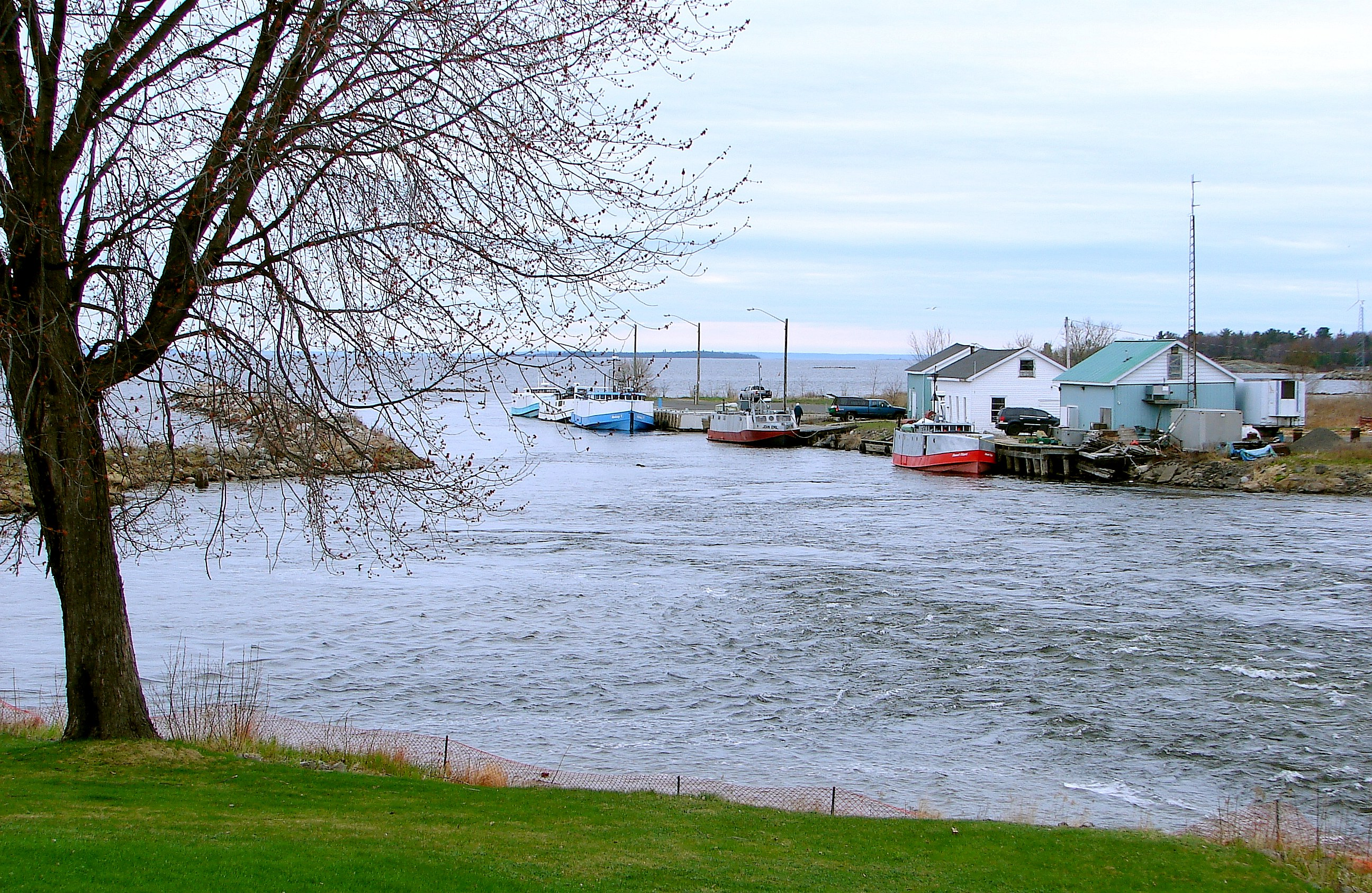
Harbour on the North Channel in Blind River

Its main businesses are tourism, fishing, logging, and uranium refining.

Transportation links are Highway 17 (part of the Trans-Canada Highway), the Huron Central Railway operating on the leased Canadian Pacific Railway line that runs through the town, and the Blind River Marine Park, a town-owned marina servicing pleasure craft. A 1991 study by the Ontario Ministry of Transportation proposed the extension of Highway 555 (Granary Lake Road) from Blind River to meet Spine Road in Elliot Lake, creating a new route which would reduce the length of a commute between the two communities by approximately 20 kilometres. Although the ministry has announced no firm plans to construct the proposed road, Elliot Lake City Council passed a motion in August 2015 calling for the project's revival on the grounds that it would provide significant economic benefit to both communities.

The town also provides services to the surrounding communities through its District Health Centre, two high schools (W.C. Eaket Secondary School and École secondaire catholique Jeunesse-Nord) and three elementary schools (Blind River Public School, St. Mary's Catholic School and the French-language École Catholique St-Joseph). Blind River has seven churches, as well as a Kingdom Hall located just outside the town, and a variety of merchants and service industries.

Blind River has many beaches on Lake Huron, including Fourth Sand, Sellers Park, Boom Camp, Forest Glen Beach, as well as many others. Blind River is home to a large uranium refinery operated by the Cameco Corporation, which is situated just outside town as well as a world-renowned golf course by the name of Huron Pines Country Club, which is just 1.5 kilometres away from one of the longest running businesses in the area, MacIver's Motel & Camp Ltd, which has been family operated since 1946.

It is also home of Lauzon Aviation Co. Ltd since 1959. Lauzon Aviation is a family owned and operated outfitter offering Fly-In Hunting & Fishing Wilderness Vacations. They have appeared in several TV episodes of Fishing Canada and The New Fly Fisherman and featured in articles in Ontario Out of Doors, Field & Stream, Outdoor Life and published Trade History of the North Shore and Lake Huron.

== Sports and culture ==
- The town is home to the Blind River Beavers of the Northern Ontario Junior Hockey League.
- The Voyageur Hiking Trail passes near the town.
- "Rocking on the River" music festival held since 2010.

=== In pop culture ===
- Canadian singer Neil Young makes reference to Blind River in his song "Long May You Run", a story about the demise of his 1948 Buick Roadmaster hearse.

Well, it was back in Blind River in 1962
When I last saw you alive
But we missed that shift on the long decline
Long may you run.

- Wade Hemsworth's "The Black Fly Song", about a survey crew in northern Ontario in 1949, has a verse about a cook named "Blind River Joe".
- In the 1959 film, Anatomy of a Murder, the character Mary Pilant, played by Kathryn Grant, was born in Blind River, Ontario.
- Blind River is mentioned in the 1986 film Youngblood, starring Rob Lowe and Patrick Swayze. as one of three possible Junior C team destinations for the players if they don't improve their performances.

== Notable people ==
- Home town to former ice hockey player Tom Cassidy who played for the Pittsburgh Penguins. He was drafted 22nd overall in the 1972 by the California Golden Seals.
- Home town to Claude Julien, a former head coach of the Montreal Canadiens and Boston Bruins of the National Hockey League.
- Birthplace of Bob Dupuis who represented Canada at the 1980 Winter Olympics and played a game with the Edmonton Oilers of the National Hockey League.

== See also ==
- List of francophone communities in Ontario
