= CKCY (AM) =

Former radio station in Sault Ste. Marie, Ontario

- Sault Ste. Marie, Ontario; Canada
- Frequency: 920 kHz

Programming
- Format: Contemporary hit radio

Ownership
- Owner: Algonquin Radio (1955–1976); Huron Broadcasting (1976–1985); CKCY 920 Ltd. (1985–1988); Mid-Canada Communications (1988–1990); Pelmorex Radio Network (1990–1992)
- Sister stations: CJQM-FM

History
- First air date: May 25, 1955
- Last air date: August 30, 1992
- Former frequencies: 1400 kHz (1955–1961)

Technical information
- Class: B
- Power: 10,000 watts day 5,000 watts night

CKCY was a Canadian radio station, which signed on May 25, 1955 and broadcast until August 30, 1992, in Sault Ste. Marie, Ontario.

== History ==
The station was originally launched by Algonquin Radio, a local business consortium led by Carmen Greco, with a 250 watt signal at 1400 on the AM dial. In 1961, the station moved to 920 AM, and increased its signal to 10,000 watts daytime and 5,000 watts nighttime. Well known program announcers in the early and mid 1960s included morning man, Dave Carter, Art Christmas, country music specialist Bill Haight, Johnny Meadows (who for a period of time was also the program director of the station) and host of the evening rock show, Barry Sarazin. News announcers included Karl Sepkowski (news director), Russ Hilderley and on the weekends Norm Fera. In 1964, Algonquin launched CKCY-FM. The station operated on a frequency of 104.3 MHz with an effective radiated power of 6,760 watts. The program director and principal announcer for the FM station was Richard ("Dick") Gasparini. In contrast to the station's 'AM' programming, CKCY-FM focussed on a diet of easy listening music during the day and classical music in the evenings. In the 1960s and 1970s, Harry Wolfe, the play-by-play voice of the Ontario Hockey League's Sault Ste. Marie Greyhounds, hosted a daily call-in talk show called Open Mike. By then, CKCY had become the principal Top 40 music station in the Twin Saults.

Among the station's alumni is former Hamilton city councillor, mayor, and federal member of Parliament Bob Bratina.

In 1976, the stations were acquired by Huron Broadcasting, who also launched CKCY-TV in 1978. Huron subsequently sold the radio stations to a new business consortium, CKCY 920 Ltd., in 1985. That group subsequently sold them to Mid-Canada Radio in 1988, and Mid-Canada in turn was acquired by the Pelmorex Radio Network in 1990.

In 1984, CKCY received CRTC approval to move from 920 kHz to 540 kHz. The change to AM 540 was never implemented. CKCY remained at AM 920 until its permanent sign-off in 1992.

Due to the economic circumstances of the Sault Ste. Marie market, with competition from stations in Sault Ste. Marie, Michigan, severely curtailing the profitability of the Ontario stations, Pelmorex shut down the AM station in 1992. The FM station is still operating as CJQM-FM.

The final song to be played by CKCY was Sweeney Todd's 1975 single "Roxy Roller" at approximately 11:56 pm on August 30, 1992. Once the song was completed, an automated, repeating farewell message was broadcast past midnight and continued for several days. The actual date when CKCY ceased transmitting is not known.
