= Flagship (broadcasting) =

Key station of broadcasting group

In broadcasting, a flagship (also known as a flagship station or key station) is the broadcast station which originates a television network, or a particular radio or television program that plays a key role in the branding of and consumer loyalty to a network or station. This includes both direct network feeds and broadcast syndication, but generally not backhauls. Not all networks or shows have a flagship station, as some originate from a dedicated radio or television studio.

The term derives from the naval custom where the commanding officer of a group of naval ships would fly a distinguishing flag. In common parlance, "flagship" is now used to mean the most important or leading member of a group, hence its various uses in broadcasting. The term flagship station is primarily used in TV and radio in the United States, Canada, and the Philippines (though it is seldomly used); in the early years of radio in the United States, the term key station was used to refer to such station in a broadcast network; key station is still a valid term in television in Japan (as key kyoku; Japanese: キー局, romanized: kī kyoku).

== Examples ==
Lotteries

- Mega Millions, normally from WSB-TV in Atlanta
- Ohio Lottery weekday- and Saturday-evening drawings from WEWS in Cleveland
- Michigan Lottery from WDIV-TV in Detroit

Shows

- Delilah from KSWD in Seattle and KDUN in Reedsport, Oregon (latter owned by Delilah)
- Clark Howard from WSB/WSBB-FM in Atlanta
- The Clay Travis and Buck Sexton Show from WLAC in Nashville (Clay Travis) and WOR in New York City (Buck Sexton).
- Live with Kelly and Mark from WABC-TV in New York City

Networks

- Midnight Radio Network from WBAP in Dallas/Fort Worth

Events

- Masters Tournament from WRDW-TV, as the CBS affiliate since 1956.

== Radio ==
A flagship radio station is the principal station from which a radio network's programs are fed to affiliates.

=== Network ===
In the United States, traditional radio networks currently operate without flagship stations as defined in this article. Network operations and those of the local owned-and-operated or affiliate stations in the same city are now separate and may come under different corporate entities.

In the U.S., CBS News Radio produces programming for distribution by Skyview Networks, but local stations WCBS and WINS in New York City and KNX (and formerly KFWB) in Los Angeles are operated separately from the network radio news operation, under a separate company with common shareholders, Audacy, Inc. iHeartMedia follows a similar model: flagship stations WOR in New York City (which it acquired in 2012) and KFI in Los Angeles are both operated mostly separately from its syndication wing, Premiere Networks (Premiere does produce some limited programming, including The Jesus Christ Show, The Tech Guy and Handel on the Law, through KFI). Premiere's The Clay Travis and Buck Sexton Show uses WLAC as a flagship station, as Clay Travis is based in Nashville.

WWRL in New York City was an affiliate of the now-defunct Air America Radio and carries some of its programs (along with those from other distributors) but is separately owned and operated and does not produce any programs for the network. Originally, Air America Radio leased WLIB (also in New York City) as its flagship station; the station was completely automated and produced no local programming. The network would later lease WZAA in Washington, D.C., as its lone self-operated station.

Fox Sports Radio's flagship station is KLAC in Los Angeles, with which it merged operations in 2009. SB Nation Radio is flagshipped at KGOW in Houston; one of its predecessors, Sporting News Radio, was previously flagshipped at WIDB (now WSFS) in Chicago. CBS Sports Radio is nominally flagshipped at WFAN (although that station does not produce programming for the network). ESPN Radio has no true flagship station, as it operates out of ESPN headquarters in Bristol, Connecticut; Windsor Locks-licensed WUCS (owned by iHeartMedia) serves as its de facto flagship, serving ESPN's home market of Hartford.

Nash FM, a country music network, is nominally flagshipped at WKDF in Nashville, Tennessee; its classic-leaning counterpart Nash Icon is flagshipped at WSM-FM in the same city. MeTV FM, a classic oldies/soft rock network, is flagshipped at WRME-LD in Chicago, the home base of its owner, television broadcaster Weigel Broadcasting. The Satellite Music Network networks were flagshipped at a cluster of stations in the Dallas-Fort Worth Metroplex during their existence; KMEO, for example, served as the flagship for Unforgettable Favorites. CloudCast is flagshipped at KZOY in Sioux Falls, South Dakota, with much of its programming voicetracked from WGWE in Little Valley, New York.

Former flagship stations for now-defunct networks in American radio's "Big Four" era of the 1940s–1980s were:

NBC Red Network

- WNBC (660 AM; now WFAN), New York City
- WYNY (97.1 FM; now WQHT), New York City
- KNBR (680 AM), San Francisco
- KYUU (99.7 FM; now KMVQ-FM), San Francisco

Mutual Broadcasting System

- WOR (710 AM), New York City
- WGN (720 AM), Chicago
- KHJ (930 AM), Los Angeles

In Canada, current CBC/Radio-Canada flagships are CBLA-FM (99.1) in Toronto, which broadcasts in English, and CBF-FM (95.1) in Montréal, which broadcasts in French. Both are former AM clear channel operations which have moved to FM.

Former flagship stations for now-defunct networks were:

- CJBC (860 AM) in Toronto (CBC Dominion Network, a secondary English-language AM service)
- CKO in Montréal (a national chain of big-city English-language all-news stations, controlled primarily from Toronto)
- VONF in St. John's, Dominion of Newfoundland (Broadcasting Corporation of Newfoundland – became CBN after Newfoundland and Labrador joined Canada, its rebroadcasters included VOWN in western Newfoundland and VORG radio in Gander)

While CJBC remains on-air on its original frequency, it is now an owned-and-operated station of the French-language Radio-Canada network.

The CKO network's Toronto frequency was re-issued to CBL (as CBLA-FM 99.1) but the namesake CKO (AM) flagship in Montréal is silent; the frequency remains vacant.

=== Syndication ===
For syndicated radio programs, it refers to the originating station from which a program is fed by satellite or other means to stations nationwide, although the show may also originate elsewhere or from a home studio via an ISDN line. Some programs are simulcast on television, while others are simulcasted on XM Satellite Radio and / or Sirius Satellite Radio. Flagship stations of prominent syndicated radio programs currently include:

- Mitch Albom: WJR (760 AM)/Detroit
- Chuck Baldwin: WVTJ (610 AM)/Pensacola, Florida
- Jim Bohannon: WFED (1500 AM)/Washington, D.C.
- Delilah: KSWD (94.1 FM)/Seattle & KDUN (1030)/Reedsport, Oregon
- Steve Harvey Morning Show: WBLS (107.5 FM)/New York City
- Blair Garner: WKDF (103.3 FM)/Nashville, Tennessee
- Michael Graham: WCRN (830 AM)/Worcester, Massachusetts
- The Grand Ole Opry: WSM (650 AM)/Nashville, Tennessee
- The Sean Hannity Show: WOR (710 AM)/New York City
- Alex Jones: KLBJ (590 AM)/Austin, Texas
- The Kevin and Bean Show: KROQ (106.7 FM)/Los Angeles
- Lars Larson: KXL (101.1 FM)/Portland, Oregon
- The Tech Guy with Leo Laporte: KFI (640 AM)/Los Angeles (broadcasts from studios in Petaluma, California)
- The Clay Travis and Buck Sexton Show: WLAC (1240 AM) / Nashville, Tennessee
- Mark Levin: WABC (770 AM)/New York City (usually broadcasts from a home studio at Levin's residence in Loudoun County, Virginia)
- Paul McGuire: KBRT (740 AM)/Los Angeles
- Michael Medved: KTTH (770 AM)/Seattle
- Nights with Alice Cooper: KDKB (93.3 FM)/Phoenix, Arizona
- Dennis Prager: KRLA (870 AM)/Los Angeles
- Renfro Valley Gatherin': WRVK (1460 AM)/Mount Vernon, Kentucky
- Rewind with Gary Bryan: KRTH (101.1 FM)/Los Angeles
- Rick and Bubba: WZZK (104.7 FM)/Birmingham, Alabama
- The Randi Rhodes Show: WJNO (1290 AM)/West Palm Beach, Florida
- Rover's Morning Glory: WMMS (100.7 FM)/Cleveland, Ohio
- Orion Samuelson and Max Armstrong: WGN (720 AM)/Chicago
- The Ace & TJ Show: WHQC (96.1 FM)/Charlotte, North Carolina
- The Savage Nation: KSFO (560 AM)/San Francisco (show now defunct)
- The Bob & Tom Show: WFBQ (94.7 FM)/Indianapolis
- The Free Beer and Hot Wings Show: WGRD-FM (101.5 FM)/Grand Rapids, Michigan
- The Jason Lewis Show: KTLK (100.3 FM)/Minneapolis-St. Paul, Minnesota
- On Air with Ryan Seacrest: KIIS (102.7 FM)/Los Angeles, California
- America's Truckin' Network: WLW (AM 700)/Cincinnati
- At Home With Gary Sullivan: WKRC (AM 550)/Cincinnati

==== Examples ====
- WXRK (92.3 FM) in New York City was the flagship station of The Howard Stern Show from 1985 until 2005. The show is now on Sirius Satellite Radio Channel 100 (a.k.a. Howard 100).
- WOR (710 AM) in New York City was the flagship station of the syndicated programs of Joy Browne, Jay Severin, Bob Grant, The Dolans and Joey Reynolds produced in-house with its own network; the network was shut down after Buckley Broadcasting sold the station.
- WGN (720 AM) in Chicago was considered the originating station for Paul Harvey's News and Comment and The Rest of the Story for the ABC Radio Network.
- KABC (790 AM) in Los Angeles was the home base of Larry Elder until the show ended its run in 2009. That show now originates from KRLA.
- WABC had been the original flagship of The Rush Limbaugh Show before Limbaugh moved to West Palm Beach, Florida and a subsidiary of Clear Channel Communications began distributing the program.
- KNEW was the flagship of The Savage Nation from 2003 to 2009.
- WNBC and WFAN were the flagships of Imus in the Morning from 1971 to 2007. He was dropped after his controversial remarks about the Rutgers University women's basketball team but picked up by WABC later that year; that station served as flagship until he retired in 2018.
- KPTK (1090 AM) in Seattle was the flagship of Ron Reagan's syndicated show on Air America Media before the network went bankrupt. It was one of the few shows on the network that did not originate from the network's New York City studios.
- WWVA (1170 AM) flagshipped the Wheeling Jamboree from 1933 until the late 2000s. It later moved to WKKX in 2009, then owned-and-operated station WWOV-LP in 2014, before cutting back from a weekly show to three episodes per year in 2016.

=== Sports ===
In sports broadcasting, the flagship radio station is the sports team's primary station in the team's home market that produces game broadcasts and feeds them to affiliates. For example, WJZ-FM is the radio flagship station of the Baltimore Orioles baseball team, which feeds Orioles' games to 20 stations in Maryland and adjacent states.

== Television ==
A flagship television station is the principal privately owned television station of a television network in the United States, Canada, Brazil, Japan, Mexico, Australia and the Philippines.

In the late 1920s, network owned-and-operated stations (or "O&O") for radio in New York City began producing live entertainment and news programs, fed by telephone lines to affiliates. These eventually were dubbed flagship stations.

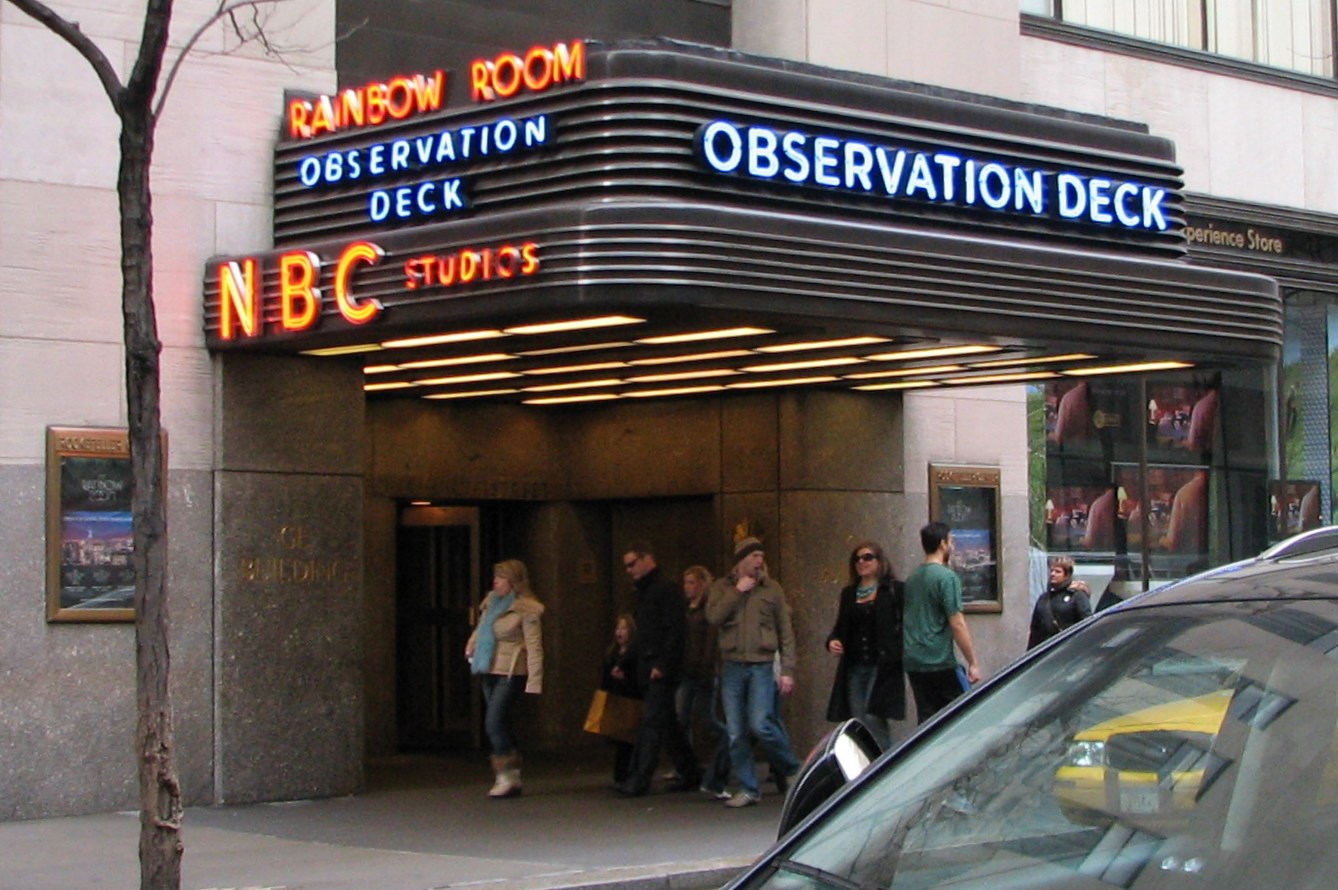
Entrance to Comcast Building, New York City, home of WNBC, flagship station of NBC

When television networks were formed in the United States in the late 1940s and grew during the early 1950s, network-owned stations in New York City became the production centers for programs originating on the East Coast, feeding affiliates of ABC, CBS, and NBC in the eastern three-fourths of the country. Stations in Los Angeles similarly started producing programs on the West Coast, feeding affiliates in the Pacific Time Zone, Alaska and Hawaii. Consequently, the networks' New York City stations became known as the "East Coast flagships" of their respective networks and the networks' Los Angeles stations became known as the "West Coast flagships".

However, before the 1950s, San Francisco was also considered a West Coast flagship market for the networks, with much of the CBS and NBC network's West Coast news programming originating from that city. This is seen the calls of CBS's KCBS (AM) being based in their original city of San Francisco instead of Los Angeles (the use of KCBS-TV in Los Angeles only dates back to 1984), while KNBR (which was subsequently sold to another party by NBC in 1987) was formerly known as KNBC before the network moved those calls to KRCA-TV in Los Angeles in 1962.

ABC, CBS and NBC are headquartered in New York City, which is the largest television market in the U.S., so their respective radio and television stations in that market are considered the overall network flagship stations. As programming schedules increased and modern technology improved transmission to affiliates, the networks set up operations centers in New York City (for the East Coast feed) and Los Angeles (for the West Coast feed). Los Angeles is the second largest television market in the U.S., and traditional home to the motion picture industry and its pool of popular talent, one of the reasons the radio networks set up operations there in the 1930s and 1940s (just as the medium of television was starting to take off).

This arrangement is reversed for the Fox Broadcasting Company. When Fox was launched in 1986, its network operations center was (and still is) based in Los Angeles. However, Fox's parent company, Fox Corporation (which spun off its broadcasting properties in July 2013 into the separate 21st Century Fox, then that company spun off many of its film and cable assets to Disney in 2019), is headquartered in New York City, along with its news division. Fox-owned WNYW in New York City is considered the network's overall flagship, while sister station KTTV in Los Angeles is considered a second flagship station.

In 2006, when The WB and UPN merged to form The CW, Philadelphia station WPSG and San Francisco station KBCW (now KPYX) were designated as the network's de facto East Coast and West Coast flagships, respectively, due to CBS owning half of The CW's controlling shares at the time. New York's affiliate WPIX and Los Angeles' affiliate KTLA did not have such status since the network's inception, as Tribune Media (who had a minority stake in The WB) opted not to have any controlling interest with The CW, by selling off its share of The WB; instead, to secure the affiliation across most of the former WB affiliates they owned at the time. Nexstar Media Group then bought Tribune in 2019; however, it had to sell off WPIX to the E. W. Scripps Company to prevent breaching the required market ownership cap set by the FCC for each broadcaster. Two years after WPIX returned to Nexstar control through partner company Mission Broadcasting, the Irving, Texas-based media firm announced that it would buy 75% of CW's shares in August 2022. With the purchase completion announced on October 3, 2022, both WPIX and KTLA formally became flagship stations for the first time. However, as part of the Nexstar agreement, Paramount was given a right with the transaction to disaffiliate all eight of their CW affiliates, which was exercised on May 5, 2023. By the time of the disaffiliations on September 1, Nexstar repatriated The CW affiliations onto their MyNetworkTV affiliates in Philadelphia, San Francisco and Tampa–St. Petersburg, announced the purchase of Detroit station WADL through affiliate company Mission Broadcasting, and signed long-term agreements with Hearst Television, Gray Television Sinclair Broadcast Group, and the E. W. Scripps Company.

=== Network ===
==== United States ====
Network	East Coast flagship (New York)^{1}	West Coast flagship (Los Angeles)^{1}
NBC	WNBC 4 WCAU 10 (Philadelphia)^{1}	KNBC 4
CBS	WCBS-TV 2	KCBS-TV 2
ABC	WABC-TV 7	KABC-TV 7
Fox	WNYW 5	KTTV 11
The CW	WPIX 11	KTLA 5
MyNetworkTV	WWOR-TV 9	KCOP-TV 13
PBS^{2}	WNET 13/WLIW 21; WGBH 2/WGBX 44 (Boston); WETA 26 (Washington D.C.); WHYY 12 (Philadelphia); WQED 13 (Pittsburgh)	KOCE 50/KCET 28/KLCS 58; KQED 9/KQET 25/KQEH 54 (San Francisco)
Ion Television	WPXN-TV 31; WPXM-TV 35 (Miami)	KPXN-TV 30
Telemundo	WNJU 47; WSCV 51 (Miami)^{1}	KVEA 52; KSTS 48 (San Francisco)
Estrella TV	WASA-LD 24; WGEN-TV (Miami)^{1}	KRCA 62
Univision	WXTV-DT 41; WLTV-DT 23 (Miami)^{1}	KMEX-DT 34
UniMás	WFUT-DT 68; WAMI-DT 69 (Miami)^{1}	KFTR-DT 46
CTN	WCLF 22 (Tampa)	none
Antenna TV; Rewind TV	WGN-TV 9 (Chicago); WPIX 11 (New York)	KTLA 5 (Los Angeles)
MeTV; MeTV+ Heroes & Icons; Story Television; Catchy Comedy; Movies! Start TV	WJLP 33 (MeTV); WZME 43 (Story Television); WBBM-TV 2 (Start TV; Chicago); WFLD 32 (Movies!; Chicago); WCIU-TV 26 (Chicago)^{1}	KAZA-TV 54 (MeTV); KHTV-CD 6 (MeTV+); KSFV-CD 27 (Satellite of KVME-TV 20) (Heroes & Icons); KPOM-CD 14 (Catchy Comedy); KTLN-TV 68 (Heroes & Icons; San Francisco); KAXT-CD 1 (Catchy Comedy; San Francisco)
True Crime Network; Quest	WXIA-TV 11 (Atlanta)^{1}	none
Comet; Charge! Roar; The Nest	WBFF 45 (Charge!; Baltimore)^{1} WNUV 54 (Comet/The Nest; Baltimore); WUTB 24 (Roar; Baltimore)	none
Circle	WSMV-TV 4 (Nashville)^{1}	none
Retro TV; Heartland; Rev'n	WOOT-LD 6 (Chattanooga)^{1}	none
Almavision	WEYS-LD 54 (Miami, Florida)	KTAV-LD 35
CTVN	WPCB-TV 40 (Pittsburgh, Pennsylvania)	none
Daystar	KDTN 2 (Denton/Dallas, Texas)	none
Family	WHME-TV 46 (South Bend, Indiana)	none
3ABN	W15BU-D 15 (Johnston City, Illinois)	none
TCT	WTCT 27 (Marion, Illinois); WACP 4 (Philadelphia)	KDOC-TV 56 (Los Angeles); KTNC-TV 42 (San Francisco)
TBN	WTBY-TV 54; KDTX-TV 58 (Dallas)^{1}	KTBN-TV 40

===== Notes =====
^{1} East Coast flagships are normally in the New York City designated market area (DMA), while the West Coast flagships are located in the Los Angeles area. WCAU in Philadelphia is listed for NBC because its parent company Comcast is headquartered here.

Meanwhile, Miami stations are also listed for Univision, Telemundo and UniMás (formerly TeleFutura) due to their operations being major production bases for those networks. The Miami area station for Ion Television is also listed due to their parent company being based out of West Palm Beach; however none of the Ion stations listed originate programming for the national Ion network (whose only original programming is the WNBA games in the summer as the network's schedule is completely automated). Networks designated for digital subchannels are usually flagshipped at local stations in the home cities of their corporate headquarters. MeTV, MeTV Plus, Catchy Comedy, and Heroes & Icons are owned by Weigel Broadcasting in Chicago; Weigel-owned WCIU carries each full network feed as a digital subchannel, while KAZA-TV alongside KHTV-CD, KPOM-CD, and KSFV-CD in Los Angeles carries MeTV, MeTV Plus, Catchy Comedy, Story Television, and Heroes & Icons, while WJLP and WZME in New York City carry MeTV and MeTV Plus, with KAXT-CD and KTLN-TV in San Francisco carries Catchy Comedy and Heroes & Icons. Heartland, Retro TV and Rev'n are all based in Chattanooga, Tennessee, the home base of WOOT-LD and common owner Get After It Media. NEWSnet is based in Cadillac, Michigan. True Crime Network and Quest are all based in Atlanta, Georgia. Comet, Charge!, Roar, and The Nest are all based in Baltimore, Maryland. Circle is based in Nashville, Tennessee. The Dallas station for TBN is listed as the network is based in Fort Worth.

^{2} While the Virginia-based Public Broadcasting Service in the United States does not have an official "flagship" television station, WNET in the New York City area held an official primary role with PBS predecessor, National Educational Television (NET). There cannot be any owned-and-operated stations within the Public Broadcasting Service; individual PBS stations are typically owned by local non-profit groups (such as WPBS-TV), universities (such as KPBS) or state-level entities as part of a state network (such as KETA-TV and WGTV). The system itself is owned collectively by the local PBS member stations. A station's importance to the system is built as much or more on the programming it produces for national distribution (a metric which places WNET as a strong third-place contender behind WGBH in Boston and WETA in Washington, D.C.) instead of local media market size. The jointly owned KCET and KOCE are the primary and secondary PBS stations in the Los Angeles market respectively, while KLCS is a tertiary PBS station.

===== Sports =====
In sports broadcasting, the flagship television station is the sports team's primary station in the team's home market that produces NFL preseason telecasts, along with in-season surrounding programming such as team, coach's, and pre-game/post-game shows and feeds them to affiliates. For example, WJBK in Detroit is the flagship station of the Detroit Lions Television Network, which feeds Detroit Lions pre-season football games to six stations in Michigan. However, the "sports flagship television station" is rapidly becoming a thing of the past, with the growing popularity of cable- and satellite-exclusive regional sports networks such as Fox Sports Networks and NBC Sports Regional Networks, which hold exclusive broadcast rights to several teams in their market for Major League Baseball, the National Hockey League and the National Basketball Association. This trend is reversing in the 2020s. KJZZ (Utah Jazz) and KTVK (Phoenix Suns) are flagship stations in the NBA, as both teams have contracts with station groups (Sinclair in Utah and Gray in Phoenix). In Major League Baseball, WPCH (Atlanta Braves) will be the flagship station for a 15-game package in their viewing region. In the National Hockey League, the Florida Panthers have WSFL as their flagship.

The National Football League has a different structure, as all games require over-the-air broadcast and the league and teams are generally loath to use only a local cable broadcaster to distribute preseason and team programming. An anti-siphoning policy is also used by the league in order for local stations to bid for all games not on broadcast television for over-the-air distribution when local teams play. Most of the league's teams partner with a local station or regional network of stations, which distributes team programming and weekly analysis shows featuring a team's head coach, with those stations allowed to market as a team's 'official station', often tied into preseason and often pay-television games (which are syndicated to primary market stations under the league's anti-siphoning policy). In a lesser arrangement, Major League Baseball teams often name a local broadcast station their official weather forecasting partner and allow them to market as such.

===== Religious =====
- KTBN 40 in Santa Ana, California – flagship of the Trinity Broadcasting Network
- KDTN 2 in Denton/Dallas, Texas – flagship of the Daystar Television Network
- W15BU-D 15 in Johnston City, Illinois – flagship of Three Angels Broadcasting Network
- WTCT 27 in Marion, Illinois – flagship of Tri-State Christian Television
- KGEB 53 in Tulsa, Oklahoma – flagship of Golden Eagle Broadcasting
- WHME-TV 46 in South Bend, Indiana - flagship of Family Broadcasting Corporation

==== Canada ====
Canadian network flagship locations vary by language. Most English-language networks eastern flagships are located in Toronto, French-language eastern flagships are located in Montreal, and West Coast flagships (regardless of language) are located in Vancouver. CTV 2, being a secondary system to the main CTV network, maintains its eastern flagship in Barrie (which is on the northwestern fringe of the Toronto market) and West Coast flagship in Victoria (which is on the southwestern fringe of the Vancouver market). CIII-DT-41 had always been considered the flagship station of Global in Toronto despite being a technical satellite station of CIII-DT, which is licensed to Paris, Ontario. However, since July 2009, the CRTC has considered CIII-DT-41 "the originating station" of Global Ontario.

The secondary French-language networks TVA and Noovo are not carried terrestrially in Western Canada, although they are usually available on pay television.

Network/System	Eastern flagship	West Coast flagship
CBC Television	CBLT-DT (Toronto)	CBUT-DT (Vancouver)
Citytv	CITY-DT (Toronto)	CKVU-DT (Vancouver)
CTV	CFTO-DT (Toronto)	CIVT-DT (Vancouver)
CTV 2	CKVR-DT (Barrie)	CIVI-DT (Victoria)
Global	CIII-DT (Toronto)	CHAN-DT (Vancouver)
Ici Radio-Canada Télé	CBFT-DT (Montreal)	CBUFT-DT (Vancouver)
Omni Television	CFMT-DT/CJMT-DT (Toronto)	CHNM-DT (Vancouver)

Networks/systems with only one flagship station

Network/System	Flagship
APTN	CHTY-TV (Yellowknife)
Télé-Québec	CIVM-DT (Montreal)
TVA	CFTM-DT (Montreal)
TVOntario	CICA-DT (Toronto)
Knowledge Network	CKNO-DT (Vancouver)
Noovo	CFJP-DT (Montreal)
Yes TV	CITS-DT (Hamilton)

==== Mexico ====
As of 2017, Mexico's national networks hold a nationwide virtual channel, thus all of the flagship stations mentioned below in most of the country are on the same channel on the rest of the stations in each network with some exceptions along the American, Guatemalan and Belizean border areas.

Network	Flagship	Digital Channel	Virtual Channel	Location	Owner
Azteca Uno	XHDF-TDT	25	1.1	Mexico City	TV Azteca
Las Estrellas	XEW-TDT	48	2.1	Mexico City	TelevisaUnivision
Imagen Televisión	XHCTMX-TDT	29	3.1	Mexico City	Grupo Imagen
Nueve	XHTV-TDT	49	4.1	Mexico City	TelevisaUnivision
Canal 5*	XHGC-TDT	50	5.1	Mexico City	TelevisaUnivision
Multimedios Televisión†	XHAW-TDT	25	6.1	Monterrey	Grupo Multimedios
Multimedios Televisión†	XHTDMX-TDT	11	6.1	Mexico City	Grupo Multimedios
Azteca 7	XHIMT-TDT	24	7.1	Mexico City	TV Azteca
Gala TV	XEQ-TDT	44	9.1	Mexico City	TelevisaUnivision
Canal Once	XEIPN-TDT	33	11.1	Mexico City	Instituto Politécnico Nacional
Once Niñas y Niños	XEIPN-TDT	33	11.2	Mexico City	Instituto Politécnico Nacional
Canal 22	XEIMT-TDT	23	22.1	Mexico City	Secretaría de Cultura
Canal Catorce	XHOPMA-TDT	30	30.1	Mexico City	Sistema Público de Radiodifusión del Estado Mexicano
Ingenio TV	XHOPMA-TDT	30	30.4	Mexico City	Secretaría de Educación Pública
TV•unam	XHOPMA-TDT	30	30.5	Mexico City	Universidad Nacional Autónoma de México
Proyecto 40	XHTVM-TDT	26	40.1	Mexico City	TV Azteca
Canal del Congreso	XHHCU-TDT	45	45.1	Mexico City	Congreso de la Unión

- Note - † Multimedios launched XHTDMX-TDT on August 27, 2018, and features limited local news and sports discussion programming on that station for Mexico City, though it continues to receive the majority of its programming from XHAW-TDT in Monterrey, which remains the main flagship for the network.

==== Australia ====
Network	Station	Channel
ABC	ABN/ABV	2
SBS	SBS	3
Seven; 7TWO	ATN/HSV	7; 72
Nine; 9Gem; 9Go! 9Life; 9Rush	TCN/GTV	9
10; 10 Comedy; 10 Drama	TEN/ATV	10; 11; 12

- Note: All flagship stations are located in Sydney and Melbourne. All SBS stations use the "SBS" callsign. 10 Peach or 10 Comedy was formerly known as Eleven, with 10 Bold or 10 Drama formerly known as One until being re-branded by their new CBS Corporation, (now called Paramount Global) ownership in late 2018.

==== Japan ====
Network	Key Station (Tokyo)	Sub-key Station (Osaka)	Sub-key Station (Nagoya)	Total
NNN/NNS	JOAX-DTV	JOIX-DTV	JOCH-DTV	30
ANN	JOEX-DTV	JOAY-DTV	JOLX-DTV	26
JNN	JORX-DTV	JOOY-DTV	JOGX-DTV	28
FNN/FNS	JOCX-DTV	JODX-DTV	JOFX-DTV	28
TXN	JOTX-DTV	JOBH-DTV	JOCI-DTV	6

Notes

^{1} The total number of stations is including the three stations listed in the table.

^{2} Among the subkey stations, the four major networks are wide area stations. TXN network member stations (Osaka and Aichi) are prefectural area broadcasts.

^{3} There are 13 independent stations in Japan.

==== Philippines ====
Network	Flagship Station	City of license	Notes
Radio Philippines Network	DZKB-TV (RPTV)	Quezon City	Currently blocktimed by TV5 Network Inc.
GMA Network	DZBB-TV	Quezon City	
ZOE Broadcasting Network	DZOE-TV (A2Z)	Pasig City	Currently blocktimed by ABS-CBN Corporation.
ZOE Broadcasting Network	DZOZ-DTV (Light TV)	Pasig City	
IBC	DZTV-TV	Mandaluyong; Quezon City	
TV5	DWET-TV	Mandaluyong; Quezon City	
AMBS (ABS-CBN sa ALLTV2)	DZMV-TV	Mandaluyong; Quezon City	Currently licensed by ABS-CBN Corporation
People's Television	DWGT-TV	Quezon City	
Net 25	DZEC-TV	Quezon City	
GTV	DWDB-TV	Quezon City	
One Sports	DWNB-TV	Mandaluyong; Quezon City; Antipolo, Rizal	leased from Nation Broadcasting Corporation
RJTV	DZRJ-DTV	Makati City	
UNTV	DWAO-TV	Quezon City	
Sonshine	DXAQ-TV	Davao City	
Sonshine	DWAQ-TV	Makati^{1}	

Note

^{1} Sonshine's main headquarters are in Davao City, but also has a fully owned broadcast building in Metro Manila, thus giving the Manila station equal flagship.

=== American syndication examples ===
==== Current ====
- The popular nationally syndicated program Live with Kelly and Ryan is produced at WABC-TV in New York City.
- From 2011-17, and again since 2020, Family Feud has WUPA as its flagship station, as the show is produced in Atlanta, originally the Atlanta Civic Center, and later the Georgia World Congress Center (2016–17), Trilith Studios (2020–24), and since 2024, Tyler Perry Studios.
- As of August 16, 2025, the CBS Daytime drama Beyond the Gates features WRDW as its flagship station; the show is produced in Atlanta at Gray Television-owned Assembly Atlanta, and WRDW is the closest Gray Television CBS affiliate.

==== Former ====
- Although later produced by Harpo Studios, The Oprah Winfrey Show considered WLS-TV its flagship as the program concept as hosted by Winfrey originated in 1983 as part of WLS's mid-morning show AM Chicago; Oprah was always aired first in the nation at 9 a.m. local time on WLS.
- The popular nationally syndicated show At The Movies was also produced at WLS-TV in Chicago. Successor program Roger Ebert presents At the Movies originated from WTTW in Chicago.
- Until the consolidation of the ITV franchises during the 1990s, the majority of primetime programming on the ITV network originated from a group of franchises known as "The Big Five" (Thames Television, LWT, ATV/Central, Yorkshire, and Granada).
- The show View from the Bay was produced at KGO-TV in San Francisco and syndicated to ABC owned-and-operated stations and Live Well Network nationwide.

== Station groups ==
In the United States, the term "flagship station" may also be used in the broadcasting industry to refer to a station which is co-located with the headquarters of its station group and considered the company's most important station (such a station may or may not be affiliated with one of the major networks). For example, WDIV-TV in Detroit, affiliated with NBC, is the flagship station of Graham Media Group; and WGN-TV in Chicago was the flagship station of Tribune Broadcasting until it was purchased by Nexstar Media Group in 2019.

In essence, a flagship can be located in the market where the station's owner is headquartered, or in the largest market where that owner operates. For example, WSB-TV in Atlanta is the flagship of Cox Media Group, because Cox's headquarters is located in a suburb of that city. However, Cox owns WFXT in Boston, which is larger than Atlanta. The same can be said for TEGNA who lists three of its properties as its flagship stations (WXIA-TV in Atlanta, WUSA in Washington, D.C., and KUSA in Denver), but also owns WFAA in Dallas, which is larger than Atlanta, Washington, D.C., and Denver in terms of Media market. Likewise, prior to merging with Gannett in 2013, WFAA served as the flagship station for Belo, as its headquarters were located in Dallas. KDKA-TV in Pittsburgh served as the flagship station for New York City-based Westinghouse Broadcasting for decades as its parent company was Pittsburgh-based Westinghouse Electric Corporation; ironically, KDKA-TV lost its flagship status due to Westinghouse acquiring CBS, as opposed to another company acquiring Westinghouse.

The same also can be said for Nexstar listed two of the stations as flagships, one cited was WYOU-TV in Scranton, which Perry Sook said it was the flagship, the other listed was KDAF-TV in Dallas, which became its flagship after its acquisition of Tribune Media in 2019, the latter partially is located in a suburb of that city and also owns and operates several stations larger than Dallas, such as WPIX-TV in New York, KTLA in Los Angeles, WGN-TV in Chicago and WPHL-TV in Philadelphia. Shortly after its acquisition of Young Broadcasting by Media General in 2013, WRIC-TV in Richmond become one of the two flagship stations of the Media General group prior to the 2017 acquisition by Nexstar, the other flagship was WFLA in Tampa Bay, which was always the television flagship of the group. The same can even be said for Scripps, which listed WCPO-TV in Cincinnati as the flagship, but also owned Ion Media, which is several times larger than Cincinnati themselves. Even the same can be said for Sinclair Broadcast Group, which listed WBFF-TV in Baltimore and WJLA-TV in Washington, D.C., listed as the flagship stations of the group.

The term is also used for stations that operate satellite stations in other cities. For example, KSNW in Wichita, Kansas is the flagship station of the Kansas State Network, a chain of NBC affiliates serving western and central Kansas as well as border areas of Nebraska.

== See also ==
- Television and radio flagship stations – Japan
- List of analog television stations in the Philippines
- Television in the United States
