= Barrel man =

Barrel man, Barrel Man, or Barrelman may refer to:

- Barrel man (novelty)
- Barrel Man (Denver Broncos), a man who attended Denver Broncos football games clad in a barrel
- Barrelman, a navigator
- The Barrelman, a Newfoundland radio program
- Barrelman, a type of rodeo clown

== See also ==
- Beer Barrel Man, a mascot of the Milwaukee Brewers
- Over the Falls in a barrel, a stunt in which a man in a barrel attempts to go over Niagara Falls
- Drunkard's cloak, punishment by being placed in a barrel
- Bankruptcy barrel, wearing a barrel as symbol of penury
- Diogenes of Sinope, who lived in a container sometimes translated as "barrel"
