= CBT-FM =

Radio station in Newfoundland and Labrador, Canada

- Grand Falls-Windsor, Newfoundland and Labrador; Canada
- Broadcast area: Central Newfoundland, Baie Verte Peninsula, Roddickton
- Frequency: 93.3 MHz

Programming
- Format: News/Talk
- Network: CBC Radio One

Ownership
- Owner: Canadian Broadcasting Corporation

History
- First air date: April 1949
- Former call signs: CBT (1949–2022)
- Former frequencies: 1350 kHz (AM) (1949–1956); 990 kHz (1956–1963); 540 kHz (1963–2022)

Technical information
- Class: C1
- ERP: 100,000 watts
- HAAT: 193.6 metres (635 ft)
- Transmitter coordinates: 49°11′52.1″N 55°22′6.1″W
- Repeater: see main article

Links
- Website: CBC Newfoundland and Labrador

CBT-FM is a public radio station in Grand Falls-Windsor, Newfoundland and Labrador, Canada, owned by the Canadian Broadcasting Corporation and broadcasting the CBC Radio One news and information network.

An AM station for many decades, in 2022, CBT transitioned to FM on 93.3 MHz with an effective radiated power of 100,000 watts from a transmitter near the town of Northern Arm. Four FM re-broadcasters provide additional coverage.

== History ==
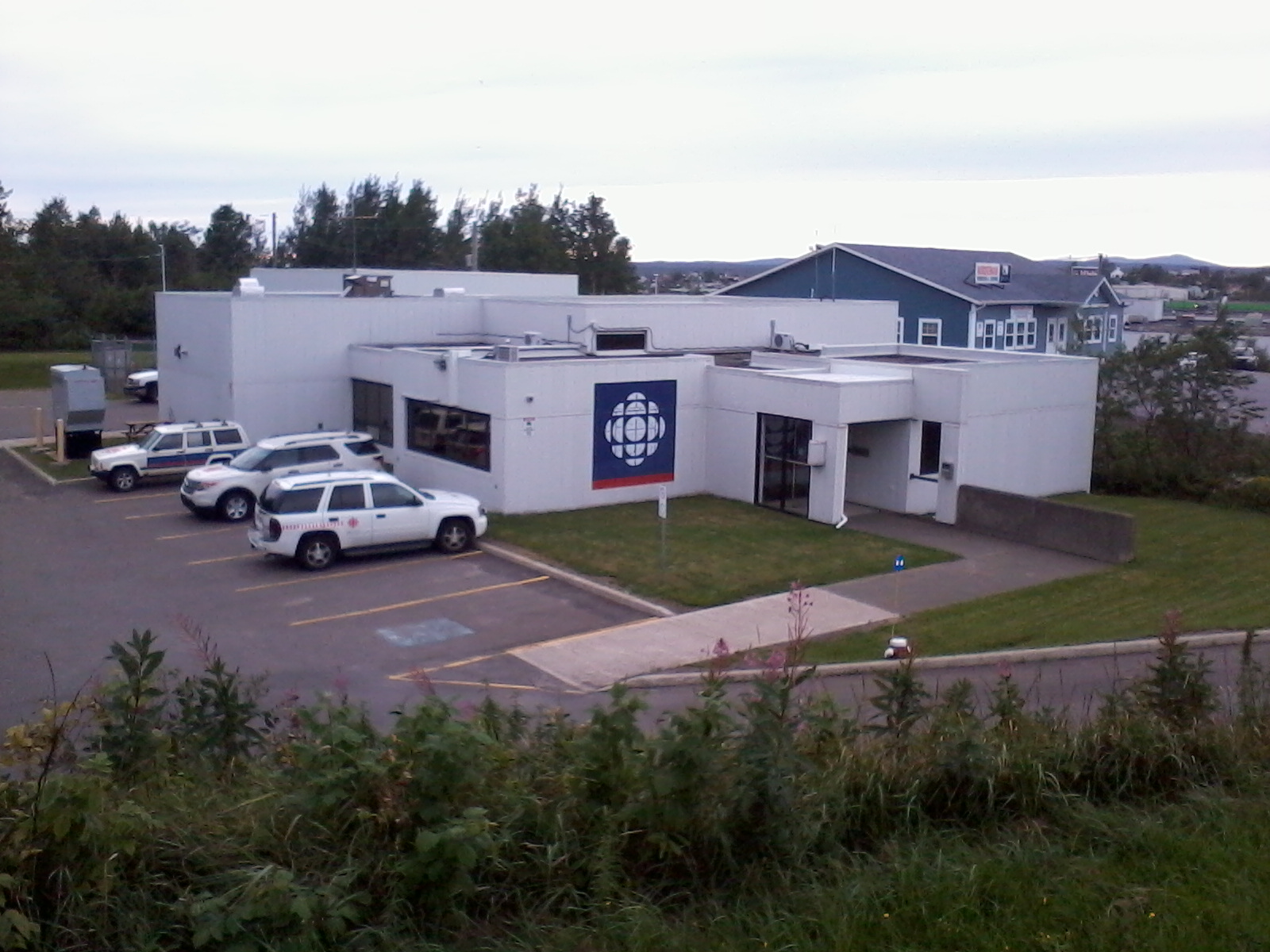
CBT's former studio building (closed in 2015)

CBT launched in April 1949 on 1350 kHz after the Broadcasting Corporation of Newfoundland, the pre-Confederation public broadcaster, was absorbed by the CBC when Newfoundland joined Canada. The frequency was changed to 990 kHz in 1956, and then to 540 kHz in 1963 (with 990 being reassigned to CBY in Corner Brook).

On 540 kHz, CBT transmitted with 10,000 watts using a non-directional antenna. It was a Class A station broadcasting on a Canadian and Mexican clear channel frequency from a transmitter on Crawley Avenue in Grand Falls-Windsor. Because it was at the bottom of the AM dial and on a clear channel frequency, CBT's signal could be heard over much of Central Newfoundland by day. At night, with a good radio, it covered most of Eastern North America.

On July 9, 2021, the CBC submitted an application to the CRTC to convert CBT 540 to 93.3 MHz with an effective radiated power of 100,000 watts (non-directional antenna with an effective height above average terrain of 193.6 metres). The application was approved on January 26, 2022, and CBT discontinued broadcasting on 540 on November 30, 2023.

For much of CBT's history, the station was operated from a studio building located at 4 Harris Avenue in Grand Falls-Windsor. However, in order to cut costs, a reorganization of CBC's central Newfoundland operations was announced in 2013, leading to the closure of the Grand Falls-Windsor building in 2015. All staff and operations based in Grand Falls-Windsor were transferred to CBG in Gander.

== Local programming ==
CBT produced its own local programming during the time it had a studio building in Grand Falls-Windsor. By the time the building closed in 2015, local programming was limited to contributions within The Central Morning Show produced at CBG in Gander. Following the closure of the building in Grand Falls-Windsor, this show became produced solely in Gander.

In 2018, The Central Morning Show was replaced by CBC Newfoundland Morning, a joint production between CBG and CBY in Corner Brook that also airs on CBT.

For the remainder of local programming blocks within the CBC Radio One schedule, CBT broadcasts programming from CBN in St. John's.

== Transmitters ==
Rebroadcasters of CBT-FM
City of licence	Identifier	Frequency	Power	Class	RECNet	Notes
Baie Verte	CBTB-FM	97.1 FM	24,200 watts	B	Query	49°57′33.84″N 56°18′38.16″W
Hampden	CBTJ-FM	101.5 FM	85 watts	A1	Query	49°31′42.96″N 56°52′8.04″W
Millertown	CBTL-FM	90.1 FM	4,200 watts	B	Query	48°48′32.04″N 56°31′32.16″W
Roddickton	CBTR-FM	92.9 FM	2,000 watts	A	Query	50°50′17.88″N 56°6′24.12″W
