= Hotel Newfoundland =

Building in St. John's, Canada

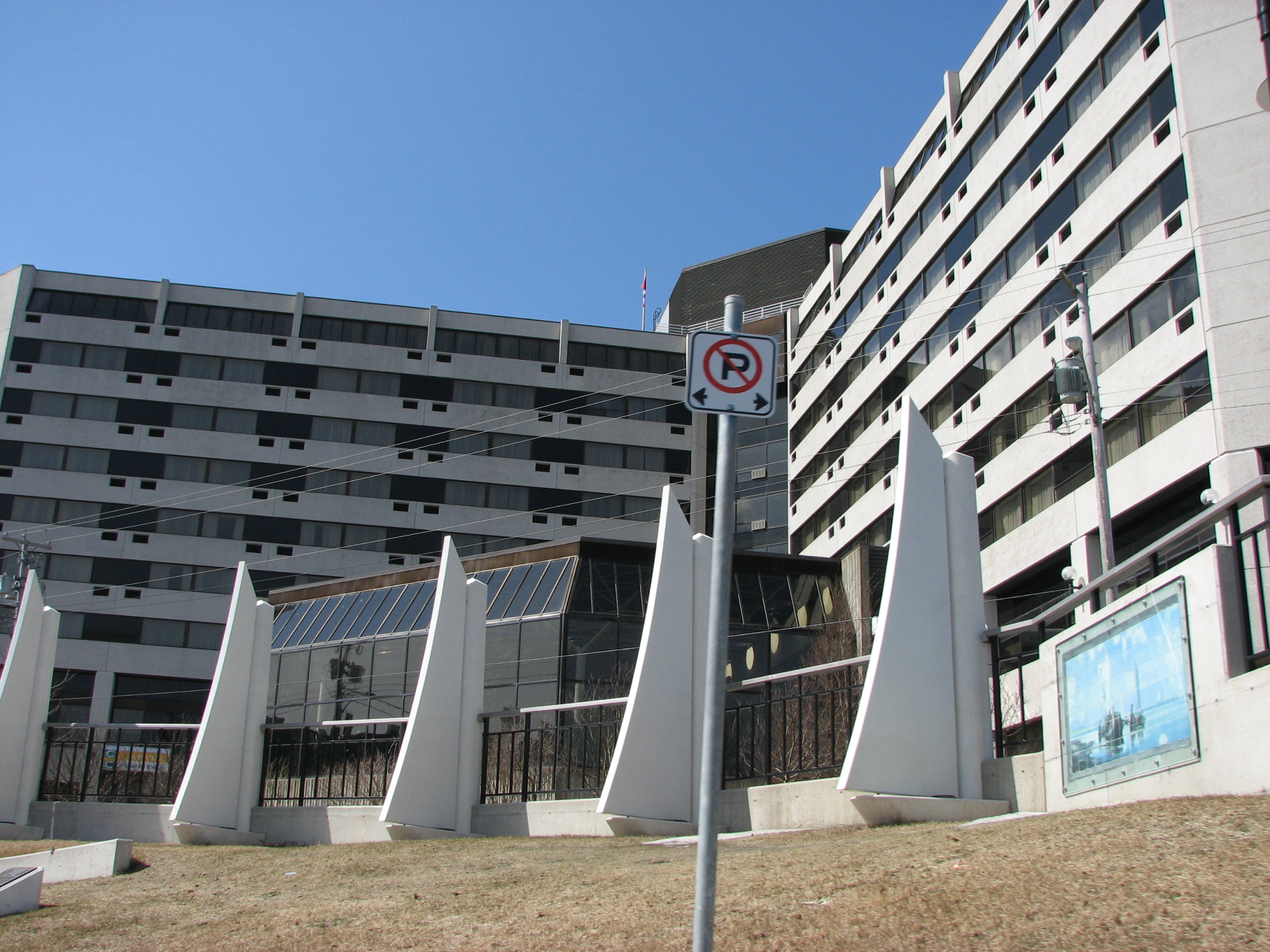

General information
- Location: 115 Cavendish Square; St. John's, Newfoundland and Labrador; A1C 3K2
- Coordinates: 47°34′16.90″N 52°42′01.74″W
- Opening: 1982 replaced 1926 hotel
- Operator: Sheraton Hotels and Resorts

Technical details
- Floor count: 8

Design and construction
- Architect: George S. Burman

Other information
- Number of rooms: 301
- Number of suites: 14
- Number of restaurants: 2

Website
- www.marriott.com/hotels/travel/yytsi-sheraton-hotel-newfoundland

The Sheraton Hotel Newfoundland is a 4-star hotel in St. John's, Newfoundland and Labrador, Canada, operating under the Marriott International banner.

== The site ==
From the late 1690s, Fort William occupied the site. Although it was replaced by Fort Townshend in the 1770s, it remained a British Army barracks until 1871 and became the first train station in the city. Following the opening of the new station in 1903, the building was demolished.

== 1926 hotel ==
=== Proposal and construction ===
A desire to increase tourism and reduce dependence upon fishing, prompted local business and political leaders to form a company, capitalized at $1 million, that promoted the erection of a large hotel. Five years later, the Government of Newfoundland gifted the land, and guaranteed the $450,000 first mortgage that partly financed the undertaking. Newfoundland Historical Facilities Ltd. let the $1 million project to T.E. Rousseau Ltd., of Quebec, and work commenced in July 1925. However, construction costs were double the estimates, and the contractor ceased business after completion, and liens likely left the owner out of pocket.

=== Pre-Confederation operation ===
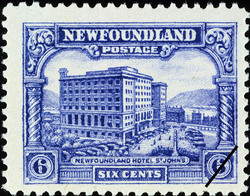
Newfoundland Hotel, 1928 postage stamp.

Opened in July 1926, the eight-storey hotel comprised 200 rooms, and the central lobby included two mezzanine floors (the lower one reduced only by the open staircase), and access to shops and restaurants. In 1928, the building appeared on a new postage stamp issue. That year, the Canadian Marconi Company operated a radio studio and transmitter at the hotel, called VOS. In 1929, the Wesley United Church, the successor, broadcast twice weekly as 8WMC. In 1932, VONF began daily broadcasts.

Experiencing low occupancy and burdensome capital debt, the hotel defaulted on mortgage payments. This triggered claims on the government guarantee in 1929, and led to a court ordered sale in 1931. Being in the midst of the Great Depression, the only offer was from the government for $447,000, which covered the outstanding mortgage principal. Subsequently, the Department of Public Works frugally ran the establishment.

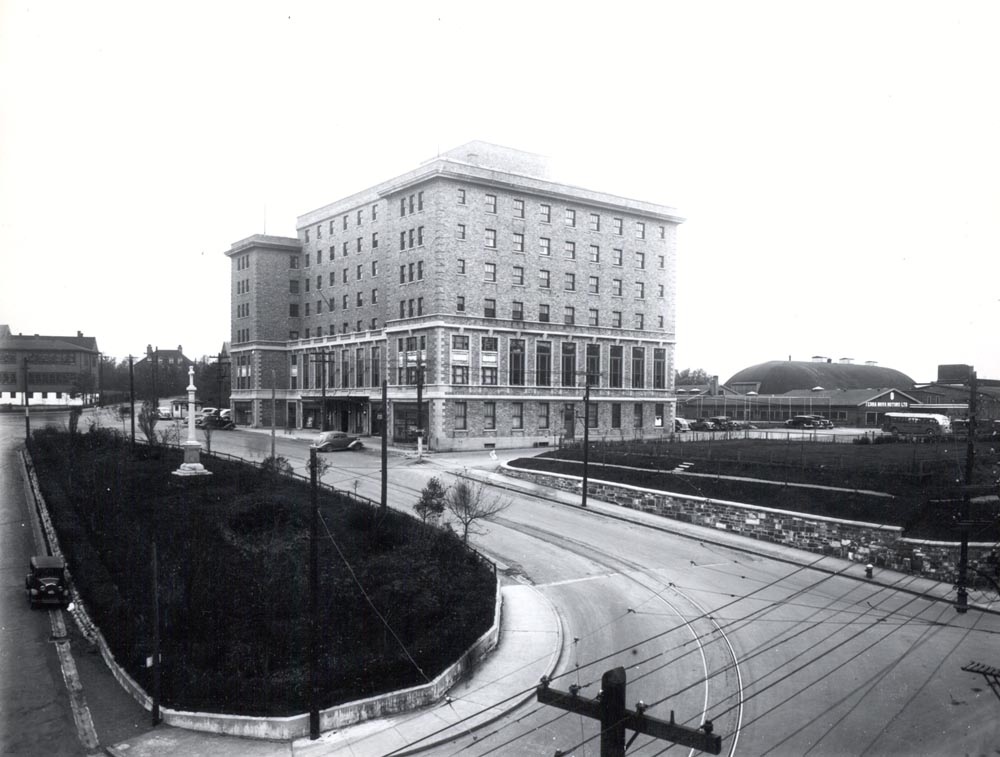
Newfoundland Hotel, 1940s

At a brief ceremony in the ballroom on 16 February 1934, Newfoundland ceased to be self-governing, although it remained a Dominion in the Empire and was governed by Commission. Acquiring VONF, the Broadcasting Corporation of Newfoundland (BCN) maintained a studio and headquarters on the sixth floor 1939–1949.

=== Post-Confederation operation ===
Within six months of Confederation, and in accordance with the specific terms of that agreement, the federal government of Canada became obligated to take possession of the loss-making hotel. Since the central lobby spanned three levels, it was described as a six-storey building, with two wings of five stories. Available for guests were 59 rooms with baths, 50 without (excluding 8 used by staff), and 16 suites. The ballroom seated 160 persons, the main dining room 110, and two smaller dining rooms 35 each. The Canadian Broadcasting Corporation (CBC) had absorbed the BCN on the sixth floor. On the main floor were two travel agents, a barbershop, drugstore, bar, and a newsstand beside the reception desk.

Despite protests from Canadian National Railway (CN), ownership transferred to the CN hotel division in 1949. During those initial years, the poorly constructed, rat-infested building cost $1.5 million to rehabilitate. A 1955 deal to sell the hotel collapsed. In the 1960s, occupancy rates improved dramatically, and the hotel became one of the more valuable in the portfolio. During 1966, the cocktail lounge capacity was doubled, the dining room and ballroom switched places, and the guest rooms were redecorated and refurnished. In accordance with a new bilingualism policy, CN renamed the property as Hotel Newfoundland. A decade later, the small rooms, dated bathrooms, and poorly planned spaces, needed a prohibitive capital investment. Consequently, in 1983, it became the only railway hotel designed by Ross and Macdonald to be completely demolished.

== 1982 hotel ==
CN invited select architects to create a visionary design for a new hotel. Burman, Bouchard Architects of Montreal submitted the winning entry. Dove Whitten Associates of St John's collaborated on the technical drawings. The 312-room hotel, with a glazed atrium resting upon a tetrahedron space frame, was built adjacent to, and east of, the earlier building. Construction began in November 1980, and the opening was December 1982. When CN exited the hotel business in 1988, Canadian Pacific Hotels (CP) purchased the property. In 2000, the hotel received the Minister's Award of Excellence for its improved occupational safety record. After CP acquired the Fairmont brand, the property became the Fairmont Newfoundland in 2001. The 2008 purchase by Fortis Inc. led to a rebranding as the Sheraton Hotel Newfoundland. In 2015, Fortis sold its entire hotel portfolio to a private investors group.
