= Jason Lewis (Minnesota politician) =

American politician (born 1955)

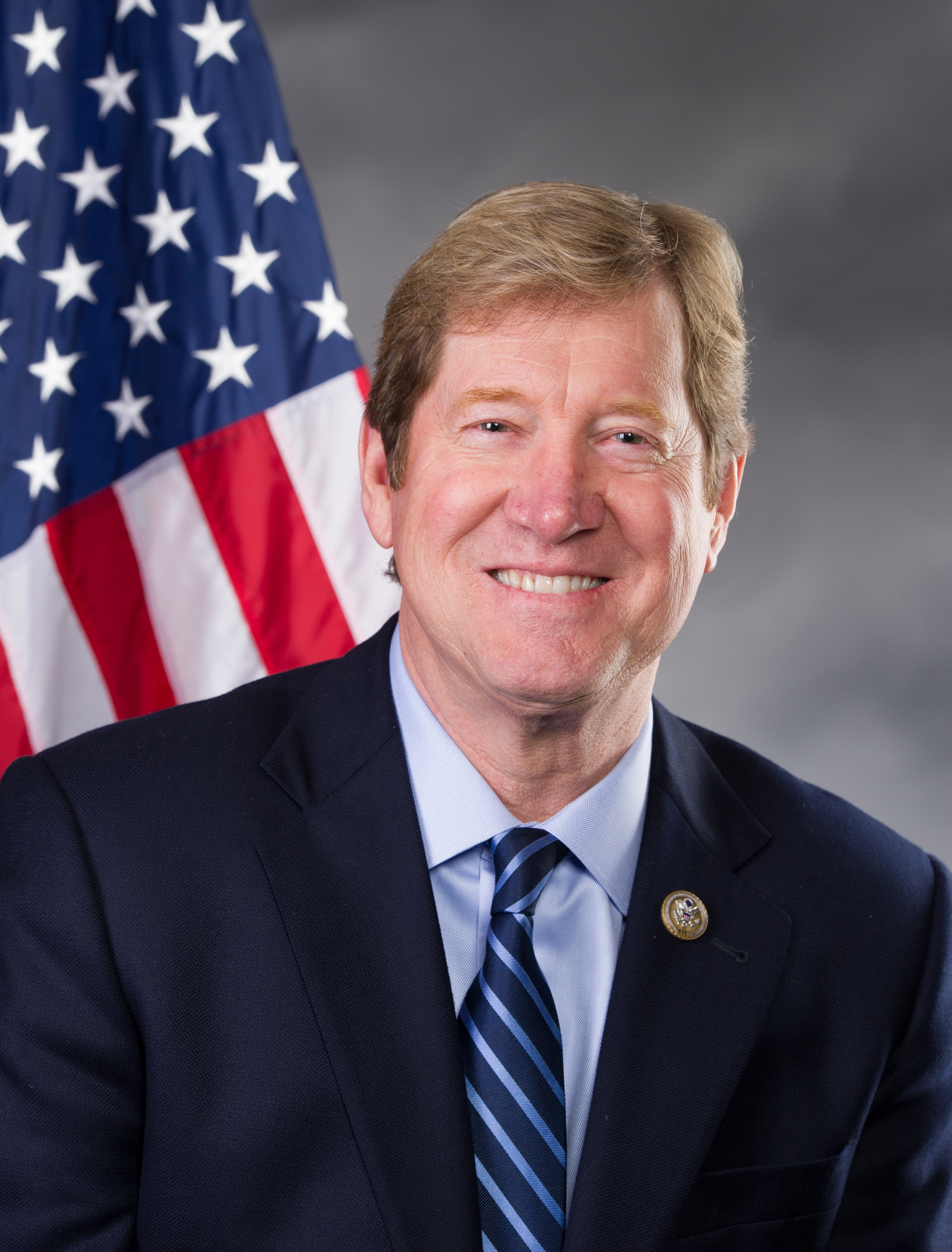
- Official portrait, 2017

Member of the U.S. House of Representatives from Minnesota's 2nd district
- In office January 3, 2017 – January 3, 2019
- Preceded by: John Kline
- Succeeded by: Angie Craig

Personal details
- Born: Jason Mark Lewis; September 23, 1955 (age 71) Waterloo, Iowa, U.S.
- Party: Republican
- Spouse: Leigh Lewis
- Children: 2
- Education: University of Northern Iowa (BA); University of Colorado, Denver (MA)

Jason Mark Lewis (born September 23, 1955) is an American politician and former conservative radio personality who served as the U.S. representative for Minnesota's 2nd congressional district from 2017 until 2019. The district included most of the southern suburbs of the Twin Cities. A member of the Republican Party, he was a radio talk show host and a conservative political commentator before serving in Congress. He hosted the nationally syndicated Jason Lewis Show, based out of KSTP (AM) in the Minneapolis–Saint Paul radio market, from 2009 to 2014.

Lewis was elected to Congress in 2016 defeating Democrat Angie Craig. He succeeded retiring Republican incumbent John Kline. He lost his bid for a second term in 2018 in a rematch against Craig. He was the Republican nominee in the 2020 U.S. Senate election in Minnesota. He was defeated by incumbent Democrat Tina Smith by a margin of 5.2 points, making it the closest Senate election in Minnesota since 2008. Some election observers attribute this close election to two pro-marijuana legalization parties taking a combined 7.69% of the vote.

== Early life and education ==
Lewis was born in 1955 in Waterloo, Iowa. He earned a master's degree in political science from the University of Colorado at Denver as well as a Bachelor of Arts in education and business from the University of Northern Iowa.

== Career ==
=== Radio ===
Lewis's show was syndicated nationally by the Premiere Radio Networks and the Genesis Communications Network. Before that, he broadcast locally for ten years on KSTP in the Minneapolis/St. Paul metropolitan area and then on WBT in Charlotte, North Carolina, for three years. In 2006 Lewis moved back to Minnesota to the newly established KTLK-FM.

On February 17, 2009, episode of his show, Lewis announced that his show would be syndicated nationally, effective February 23, 2009. Since 2007 Lewis had been one of the most frequently used and most popular guest hosts of Rush Limbaugh's radio program, allowing him to reach a nationwide audience.

On August 8, 2011, The Jason Lewis Show was picked up for national syndication by the Genesis Communications Network. On the July 31, 2014, episode, Lewis announced he was leaving the show to devote more time to a website he helped co-found.

In 2018, CNN reviewed many hours of audiotape recorded during the years when Lewis served as a substitute host for Rush Limbaugh. Lewis's comments included: "Now, are we beyond those days where a woman can behave as a slut, but you can't call her a slut?" and "One of the reasons that the Democrats love the quote unquote female issue is because they know women vote more liberally than men do. Now you could say in a very, very sexist, misogynistic way that 'Well, that's because women just don't understand money. They don't understand, they're—they don't handle finances. They're guided by emotion, not reason. Why, that's why they didn't have the vote for a full century in the country."

Lewis defended his comments by saying that he was paid to be provocative. "There's a difference between [being] a politician and a pundit", he added.

In 2013, Lewis stated on his radio show that the "Jewish lobby" was in control of the Republican Party, and falsely claimed members of the Bush administration were dual citizens of Israel and the United States.

=== Writing ===
Lewis is the author of the 2011 book Power Divided is Power Checked: The Argument for States Rights. In bonus commentary added to the 2016 audiobook version, Lewis said that many state laws prohibit consensual conduct and most of those laws are decided by the states. In the book he writes, "slavery was mercifully conquered", and suggests that "emancipated compensation" (compensated emancipation) was rejected by the Lincoln Administration—raising the question whether Abraham Lincoln "exploited the issue" of slavery to justify the "War Between the States." The book is a defense of federalism and calls for a constitutional amendment allowing "any state to peaceably leave the union."

== U.S House of Representatives ==
=== Elections ===
==== 1990 ====
In 1990, Lewis ran for Congress in Colorado's 2nd congressional district. He was defeated by incumbent Democrat David Skaggs.

==== 2016 ====
In October 2015, Lewis filed to run for U.S. Congress in Minnesota's 2nd congressional district, and was endorsed at the Minnesota Republican Party's convention on the 6th ballot on May 7, 2016. He won the four-way August primary with 46% of the vote.

The race was widely considered one of 2016's most competitive congressional elections. Roll Call journalist Alex Roarty wrote that Lewis had not openly embraced Donald Trump, but that he had been "unafraid to embrace many of the presumptive presidential nominee's trademarks: tough talk, an aversion to political correctness, and a focus on border security."

During the campaign, a number of Lewis's opinions from his radio and internet career were publicized by the news media, including comments he made about women and slavery. Lewis said on his radio show: "You've got a vast majority of young single women who couldn't explain to you what GDP means. You know what they care about? They care about abortion. They care about abortion and gay marriage. They care about 'The View.' They are non-thinking."

In an update to his book on states' rights just before the campaign, Lewis questioned the federal government's role in outlawing slavery: "In fact, if you really want to be quite frank about it, how does somebody else owning a slave affect me? It doesn't. If I don't think it is right, I won't own one, and people always say 'well, if you don't want to marry somebody of the same sex, you don't have to, but why tell somebody else they can't?' Uh, you know, if you don't want to own a slave, don't. But don't tell other people they can't."

Lewis said, "liberal reporters and typical politicians may not like the bluntness of the way I've framed some issues in my career as a voice in the conservative movement" and that his comments were "taken out of context by his opponents and the media".

On November 8, 2016, Lewis was elected to the United States House of Representatives, defeating Democratic nominee Angie Craig and independent Paula Overby.

==== 2018 ====
In 2018, Angie Craig ran against Lewis again and defeated him in the November 6 general election with 52.8% of the vote to Lewis's 47.2%.

== U.S. Senate campaign ==
=== Elections ===
==== 2020 ====
Lewis was mentioned as a possible candidate against Senator Al Franken in 2014, but did not run. In August 2019, he launched a campaign for that seat, held by former lieutenant governor Tina Smith. Lewis pledged not to distance himself from Trump or his policies. Most polls predicted Smith's reelection. She was reelected by a 5.2% margin, the closest Senate election in Minnesota since 2008. There was some speculation before the election that races would be close due to two pro-marijuana legalization parties (the G–LC and LMN), which took a combined 7.69% of the vote.

== Political positions ==
In the 115th United States Congress, Lewis voted with his party in 96.3% of votes and in line with President Trump's position in 90% of votes.

According to Project Vote Smart's 2016 analysis, Lewis generally supported anti-abortion legislation, opposed income tax increases, opposed mandatory minimum sentences for nonviolent drug offenders, opposed federal spending, supported lowering taxes as a means of promoting economic growth, opposed requiring states to adopt federal education standards, supported the building of the Keystone Pipeline, opposed federal regulation of greenhouse gas emissions, opposed gun-control legislation, supported repealing the Affordable Care Act, supported requiring immigrants who are unlawfully present to return to their country of origin before they are eligible for citizenship, and opposed American intervention in Iraq and Syria beyond air support.

=== Criminal justice reform ===
Lewis authored a bill that would provide education and vocational training resources to at-risk youth and young criminal offenders instead of levying penalties against them for petty offenses. He reintroduced the SAFE Justice Act, a criminal justice reform bill.

Lewis has criticized the war on drugs and compared it to the failed policy of alcohol prohibition in America. He cosponsored legislation to let states set their own policy on cannabis and to remove cannabis from the list of Schedule I drugs.

=== Health care ===
Lewis supported the March 2017 version of the American Health Care Act (the GOP's bill to repeal the Affordable Care Act). On May 4, 2017, he voted to repeal the ACA (Obamacare) and pass the American Health Care Act.

=== LGBT rights ===
In 2011, Lewis said that prohibitions on same-sex marriage were not discriminatory against gay people, because they would still be free to marry those of the opposite sex. In 2013, he argued against same-sex marriage, comparing gay people to rapists, speeders and polygamists. Lewis said that prohibitions against same-sex marriage could not be legally challenged on the basis of discrimination, because rapists and speeders could not reasonably argue that they were being discriminated against by prohibitions on rape and speeding. "The gay-rights lobby is playing underhanded to get their will and in the process they are shredding the Constitution of this country", he said.

Lewis suggested that households headed by gay parents might be harming their children and that more research was needed to confirm that they were not.

He called the decision of school boards to allow transgender restrooms and locker rooms in public schools an "abomination".

=== Taxes and spending ===
Lewis voted for the Tax Cuts and Jobs Act of 2017. He voted against the Bipartisan Budget Act of 2018, a bill that increased discretionary spending by $300 billion. After his vote he said, "I ran for Congress to get the economy going again by reducing taxes, regulations, deficits and debt. A $300 billion increase in discretionary spending along with hiking the debt ceiling fails on all accounts."

Lewis authored a bill that would mandate an audit of the Department of Defense. He later praised the department's decision to undergo an audit in 2018.

=== Women's issues ===
In 2011, Lewis decried laws prohibiting sexual harassment in the workplace, claiming such laws are unconstitutional because they interfere with free speech. The same year, he mocked women who claimed to have been traumatized by unwanted sexual touching and kissing.

== Personal life ==
Jason and his spouse, Leigh Lewis, reside in Woodbury, Minnesota, near the congressional district where he was elected in 2016.

On October 26, 2020, eight days before Election Day, Lewis underwent emergency surgery for an internal hernia. His campaign said that he expected to be released from the hospital within days.

Lewis is Roman Catholic.

== Electoral history ==
1990 Colorado's 2nd congressional district election
Party	Candidate	Votes	%
Democratic	David Skaggs	105,248	60.67
Republican	Jason Lewis	68,226	39.33

2016 Minnesota's 2nd congressional district election
Party	Candidate	Votes	%
Republican	Jason Lewis	172,345	47.11
Democratic	Angie Craig	164,621	45.0
Independence	Paula Overby	28,508	7.79

2018 Minnesota's 2nd congressional district election
Party	Candidate	Votes	%
Democratic (DFL)	Angie Craig	177,958	52.65
Republican	Jason Lewis (incumbent)	159,344	47.15
Write-in		666	0.20
Total votes		337,968	100.0

2020 United States Senate election in Minnesota
Party	Candidate	Votes	%
Democratic (DFL)	Tina Smith (incumbent)	1,566,522	48.74
Republican	Jason Lewis	1,398,145	43.50
Legal Marijuana Now	Kevin O'Connor	190,154	5.91
Grassroots	Oliver Steinberg	57,174	1.78
Write-in		2,261	0.07
Total votes		3,214,256	100.0

U.S. House of Representatives
Preceded by John Kline	Member of the U.S. House of Representatives from Minnesota's 2nd congressional district 2017–2019	Succeeded by Angie Craig
Party political offices
Preceded by Karin Housley	Republican nominee for U.S. Senator from Minnesota (Class 2); 2020	Succeeded by Michele Tafoya
U.S. order of precedence (ceremonial)
Preceded by Chip Cravaack as Former U.S. Representative	Order of precedence of the United States as Former U.S. Representative	Succeeded by Jim Bunn as Former U.S. Representative
