= CBDQ-FM =

Radio station in Newfoundland and Labrador, Canada

- Labrador City, Newfoundland and Labrador; Canada
- Broadcast area: Labrador City-Wabush
- Frequency: 96.3 MHz

Programming
- Format: News/Talk
- Network: CBC Radio One

Ownership
- Owner: Canadian Broadcasting Corporation
- Sister stations: Former: CBNLT

History
- First air date: 1984
- Former call signs: CBDQ (1984–1995)
- Former frequencies: 1490 kHz (1984–1995)

Technical information
- Class: A
- ERP: 255 watts
- Transmitter coordinates: 52°56′52.08″N 66°54′56.88″W

Links
- Website: CBC Newfoundland and Labrador

CBDQ-FM is a radio station broadcasting at 96.3 MHz from Labrador City, Newfoundland and Labrador, Canada, and is the local Radio One station of the Canadian Broadcasting Corporation. CBDQ has no rebroadcasters.

== History ==
CBDQ began as a CBC Low Power Relay Transmitter (LPRT) on the AM band rebroadcasting CFGB Happy Valley-Goose Bay. By 1984 it was operating on 1490 kHz with 1,000 watts day/250 watts night. In 1994, CBDQ was granted a separate licence to originate programming. In 1996, the station switched to 96.3 MHz and the call sign was then changed to CBDQ-FM.

== Local programming ==
CBDQ contributes reports to CFGB-FM Happy Valley-Goose Bay during the local morning show, Labrador Morning hosted by Janice Goudie.

For the remainder of local programming blocks within the CBC Radio One schedule, CBDQ broadcasts programming from CBN in St. John's.
