= Burgeo Broadcasting System =

Canadian television company

- Trade name: Burgeo Broadcasting System
- Industry: Telecommunications
- Founded: 1982; 44 years ago
- Headquarters: Burgeo, Newfoundland and Labrador
- Area served: Burgeo
- Key people: Steve Hiscock
- Products: Cable television

The Burgeo Broadcasting System (abbreviated as BBS) is a Canadian community cable television company headquartered and serving Burgeo, a small town located in the south-western corner of the island of Newfoundland. Most of its operations are overseen by Steve Hiscock, who is a producer at the community channel, BBS Channel 10.

BBS also operates CIBB-FM, a relay of CBC Radio One station CBN.

== History ==
BBS's history traces back to the late 1960s, when the Newfoundland Broadcasting Company Limited established a 10-watt retransmitter station of CJON-TV, which at the time was an affiliate of the CTV Television Network. By the same time, a 5-watt CBNT-TV retransmitter was also installed, bringing CBC Television to Burgeo. By 1971, both transmitters had fallen into disrepair and reinstalling them would be seen as costly. CBC received a commitment to reinstall the CBNT relays in 1974, catering Burgeo and Ramea, which went on air in September 1976. In 1977, plans were underway for both towns to use the existing equipment to provide an additional local television station. Despite heavy maintenance, the experiment only lasted two weeks, forcing viewers to remain only with the CBC relays. Approaches with CJON were held until 1981 with the CRTC, which were seen as fruitless.

In 1980, then-Mayor of Burgeo Lloyd Walters received word of the CANCOM satellite which would ease the introduction to remote communities as well as northern Canada. Following CANCOM's approval in April 1981, a meeting was held on May 19 to co-ordinate the establishment of a local cable television service in Burgeo. Subsequently the CRTC approved its creation in the spring of 1982 and BBS began delivering its cable television services, including its community channel, in the fall of 1982. Initially, it provided four television signals and four radio signals to its subscribers. The TV channels were CHCH, BCTV, CITV and CBNT. In 1989, it was authorized to operate a relay station of CBN.

In 2001, it received a CA$600,000 grant from the Canada-Newfoundland Agreement for the Economic Development Component of the Canadian Fisheries Adjustment and Restructuring Initiative, providing it with internet access, which was also spread to four other communities in Newfoundland's south coast region. By 2002, BBS had over 20 channels on offer, including BBS Channel 10 and Ads on Cable. The number rose to 40 in 2018. It struck a deal with Alvarion in April 2013 to create a high-speed wireless connection between the five communities served by BBS's ICT platform.

== BBS Channel 10 ==
BBS Channel 10 is the local community channel. Much of its programming is handled by Steve Hiscock, who is a cameraman and an editor. He plays a fictional character for interviews, Uncle Sam, as comic relief. Although Hiscock has speech impediment, he is still producing programs such as the news, bingo and interviews. On December 17, 2017, he read The Night Before Christmas in-character as Uncle Sam. He was nominated for a national award in 2019.
