= The Barrelman =

The Barrelman was a name adopted by Joseph Smallwood for his fifteen-minute radio program on the Broadcasting Corporation of Newfoundland to promote pride in Newfoundland's history and culture. The show began as a column in the Daily News newspaper, and later appeared as a radio show on St. John's radio station VONF (Now CBN) in 1937 and became part of BCN's schedule when the network was established two years later. Within a week of its 1937 premiere, it had gathered an appreciative audience that it caught the attention of F.M. O'Leary Limited who began sponsoring it. The program was aired six nights a week and remained on the air for seven years.

The opening introduction was always;

F.M. O'Leary Limited presenting The Barrelman in a program of making Newfoundland better known to Newfoundlanders.

The show consisted of The Barrelman (Smallwood) telling anecdotes and tales illustrating the culture and likeable attributes of the Newfoundland people in a historical context.

The program made Smallwood a household name throughout Newfoundland. In November 1943 Smallwood left the program to operate a pig farm in Gander, and was succeeded as the Barrelman by journalist Michael Harrington. Harrington continued the show until 1955. Subsequently, Smallwood became a leading figure in Newfoundland politics.

A barrelman is an individual who was stationed in the crow's nest of a ship and was the first to spot any sign of danger and the one who first sighted land. It was an appropriated term to distinguish Smallwood's relay to his message of making Newfoundland better known to Newfoundlanders.
