= CFGB-FM =

Radio station in Newfoundland and Labrador, Canada

- Happy Valley-Goose Bay, Newfoundland and Labrador; Canada
- Broadcast area: Labrador
- Frequency: 89.5 MHz

Programming
- Format: News/Talk
- Network: CBC Radio One

Ownership
- Owner: Canadian Broadcasting Corporation
- Sister stations: Former: CFLA-TV

History
- First air date: February 23, 1953
- Former call signs: CFGB (1953–1985)
- Former frequencies: 1340 kHz (1953–1985)
- Call sign meaning: Canadian Forces Goose Bay

Technical information
- Class: B
- ERP: 4,500 watts
- HAAT: 195.5 metres (641 ft)
- Transmitter coordinates: 53°17′57.12″N 60°32′12.12″W
- Repeater: see main article

Links
- Website: CBC Newfoundland and Labrador

CFGB-FM is a radio station broadcasting on 89.5 MHz (FM) from Happy Valley-Goose Bay, Newfoundland and Labrador, Canada, and is the local Radio One station of the Canadian Broadcasting Corporation, serving as that network's primary outlet in Labrador. A shortwave relay, CKZN, rebroadcasts CFGB's signal to remote areas of Labrador.

== History ==
CFGB launched on February 23, 1953, on 1340 AM. It was originally operated by the Royal Canadian Air Force. It was taken over by the CBC on February 23, 1959, and became part of the CBC Northern Radio Service. The station received CBC news and topical programs by relaying the signal from CBA in Sackville, New Brunswick. Tapes recorded in Montreal were also flown in on regular airline flights. Eventually the station was linked into the primary CBC network feed.

In 1985, CFGB moved to 89.5 FM. The call sign then changed to CFGB-FM.

== Local programming ==
CFGB produces its own local morning show, Labrador Morning hosted by Rhivu Rashid. CBDQ-FM in Labrador City also contributes reports.

For the remainder of local programming blocks within the CBC Radio One schedule, CFGB broadcasts programming from CBN in St. John's.

== Transmitters ==
Rebroadcasters of CFGB-FM
City of licence	Identifier	Frequency	RECNet	CRTC Decision	Notes
Cartwright	CFGB-FM-1	93.9 FM	Query	2013-552	53°42′30.96″N 57°0′24.12″W
Churchill Falls	CBQA-FM	91.1 FM	Query	88-206	53°31′45.84″N 64°0′55.08″W
Fox Harbour	CBGF-FM	101.7 FM	Query	84-48	52°22′10.92″N 55°39′54″W
Hopedale	CBNN-FM	91.1 FM	Query	84-561	55°27′51.84″N 60°14′30.12″W
Makkovik	CBNI-FM	103.5 FM	Query		55°4′59.16″N 59°10′35.04″W
Nain	CBNZ-FM	95.1 FM	Query		56°32′26.88″N 61°41′53.16″W
Port Hope Simpson	CBNP-FM	105.1 FM	Query		52°32′48.84″N 56°18′39.96″W
Postville	CBND-FM	105.1 FM	Query		54°54′33.84″N 59°46′32.16″W

The callsign CBND was used by a former low-power AM rebroadcasting transmitter in Flower's Cove, which had operated at 790 kHz in 1972 to rebroadcast the programming of CBN. In 1968, CBND was approved to move from 600 kHz to 920 kHz according to the Canadian Communications Foundation's CBN website. Its unknown when CBND signed on in Flower's Cove and when it left the air, however, there is a CBND-FM currently operating at 105.1 MHz in Postville rebroadcasting CFGB-FM.

On October 16, 2013, the CRTC approved the CBC's application to convert CBNK 570 to 93.9 MHz, broadcasting with an average effective radiated power of 50 watts (non-directional antenna with an effective height of antenna above average terrain of 19.1 metres). After CBNK's move to FM, the call sign was changed to CFGB-FM-1.

On May 24, 2016, the CBC applied to convert CBNZ 740 to 95.1 MHz with 50 watts of power (average and maximum ERP). Antenna height will be -29.63 metres with a non-directional radiation pattern. The CRTC approved the CBC's application to move CBNZ to 95.1 FM on September 7, 2016.

=== Shortwave relay ===
In 1989, a shortwave relay of CBN—St. John's with the call sign CKZN operating on 6.16 MHz (in the 49m band) was granted authority to rebroadcast CFGB part-time as well as CBN. The transmitter had previously relayed CBN and its predecessor VONF exclusively since 1939. In 1994, CKZN became a full-time rebroadcaster of CFGB. Transmitting with 1,000 watts, it could be heard over much of the North American continent and in Europe, particularly at night. CKZN has been silent since 2017 as a cost-saving measure by the CBC. However, the station has not been deleted and CKZN's license was renewed by the CRTC in 2022.
