= Barrel man (novelty) =

Pornographic toy

Barrel man

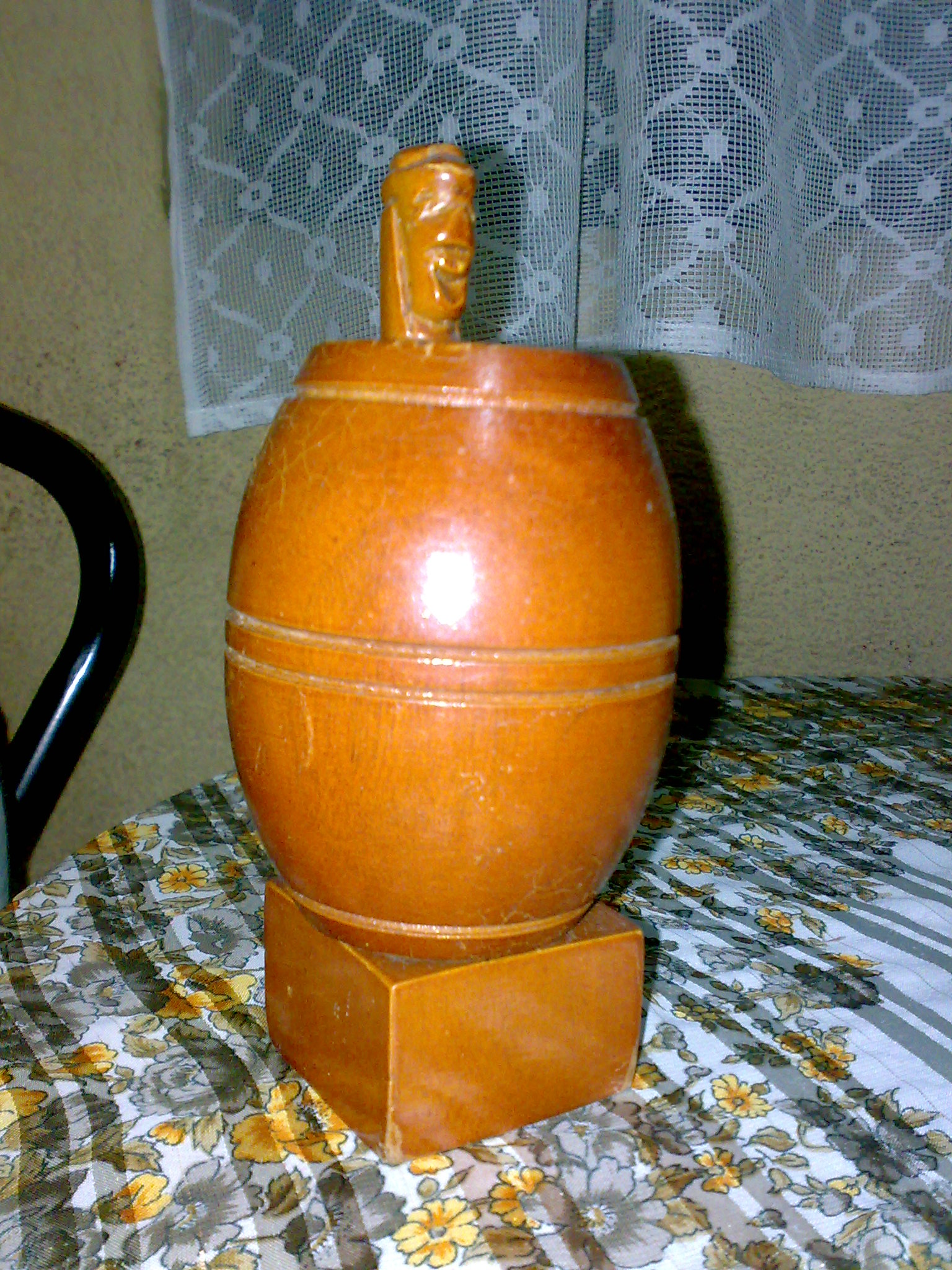
With the barrel

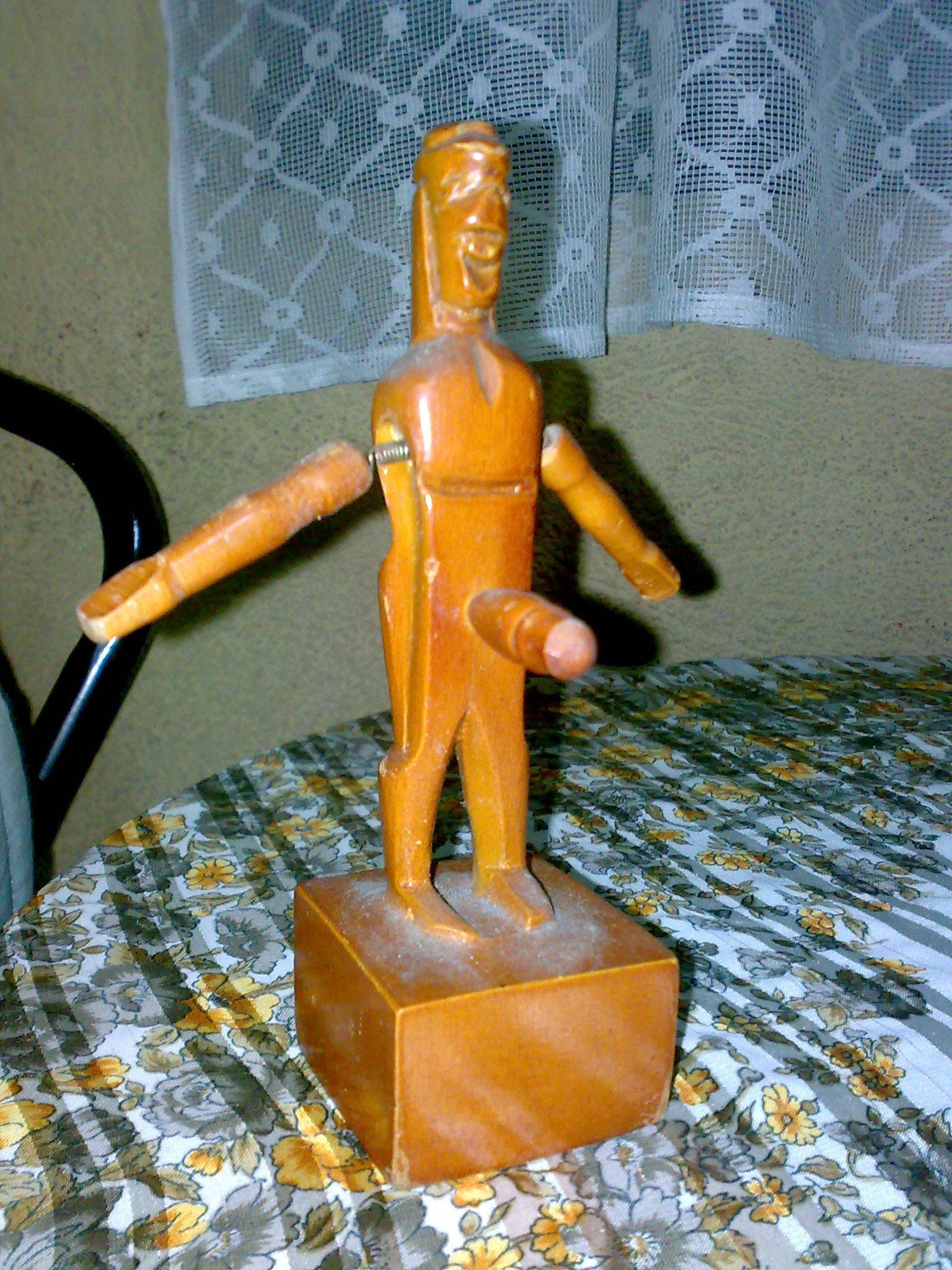
Without the barrel

A barrel man or barrelman is a souvenir doll or statuette popular in the Philippines. The statuette usually consists of a crude male figurine carved out of wood, partially hidden inside a round wooden barrel. When the barrel is taken off, the male figure inside is revealed, sporting a prominent phallus in the lower part of the figure's anatomy.

The souvenir is fairly common in gift shops in the Philippines and is somewhat popular among tourists who may be surprised the first time they encounter the object and lift its barrel.

== Cultural significance ==
The barrel man has also been identified as a part of Philippine culture and art, often as the subject of Filipino jokes. In 2005, the Filipino American Network sponsored an exhibit called "Beyond the Barrelman" in Chicago. The event showcased artworks of Filipino artists from North America and the Philippines. The barrel man was also featured in the Filipino-American movie The Debut in 2001 starring Dante Basco.

University of the Philippines Baguio's chairman for the Program of Indigenous Cultures, Io Jularbal, asserts that the barrel man is a byproduct of Westernization. He points out that prior to the arrival of foreigners in the Cordilleras that indigenous people freely roamed around with little to no clothing with no shame. Jularbal says that the barrel element was influenced from the Americans; with the concept of "a man in a barrel" denoting poverty or socioeconomic failure.

National Artist Kidlat Tahimik in his research in the 1990s on the barrel man took note of a widely held belief that the barrel man was conceived as a "form of protest" against Westerners. It is believed that the Ifugaos created the barrel man in the 1900s to mock the American colonizers who caused the displacement of the Ibalois. Tahimik himself posed as a "living barrel man" as a social commentary to advance a message that colonizers corrupted the "native sensibility".

The item was briefly banned in Baguio in the 1960s by Luis Lardizabal, the city's mayor of that time.

== Production ==
The origin of the barrel man, which is traditionally made in Ifugao, is unclear. According to a documentary of GMA's iJuander's, the barrel man's origin could be traced to woodcarvers of Asin Road in Benguet, who are known as the munpaot. The mass production of more polished machine-made barrel men from outside Baguio lessened the demand for the traditional version of the souvenir.

== Variations ==
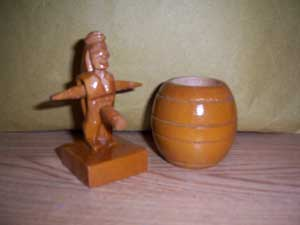
Miniature barrel man

In recent years, a female version of the figurine has appeared. The surprise is the woman's breasts.
