= The Jason Lewis Show =

- Syndicates: Genesis Communications Network
- Starring: Jason Lewis
- Original release: February 23, 2009 – July 31, 2014
- Website: www.JasonLewisShow.com

The Jason Lewis Show was a weekday American talk radio show hosted by Jason Lewis that was broadcast live from 6:00 PM to 9:00 PM Eastern time from its flagship station KSTP-AM 1500 in Minneapolis/St. Paul. The show was nationally syndicated by Genesis Communications Network.

Lewis planned on retiring from his show on August 1, 2014, in order to devote his time to his "Galt.io" project and also out of general frustration of the radio business itself, making these plans known to management, and chose to announce the decision abruptly on his Thursday, July 31 show live on the air.

Following his retirement from talk radio, in 2016 Lewis ran for the United States Congress in Minnesota's second district, winning the seat and assuming office on January 2, 2017.
