= Delilah (radio host) =

American radio personality and host

- Born: February 15, 1960 (age 66); North Bend, Oregon, U.S.
- Other name: Delilah Rene
- Occupations: Radio personality; author; songwriter
- Years active: 1983-present
- Known for: Radio

Delilah Rene Luke (born February 15, 1960) is an American radio personality, author, and songwriter, best known as the host of a nationally syndicated nightly U.S. radio song request and dedication program, with an estimated eight million listeners. She first aired in the Seattle market as Delilah Rene, though she is now known simply as Delilah.

== Early life ==
In 1969, Delilah's family moved from Coos Bay, Oregon, to neighboring Reedsport, where she attended school. At age 13, she secured her first radio job after winning a school speech contest judged by owners of KDUN, a local radio station. After graduating from high school in 1978, she worked at numerous stations in Oregon and Seattle before creating the format she became known for at KLSY in 1984.

== Radio show ==
=== Format ===
The show, known simply as Delilah, begins at 7 p.m. and ends around midnight local time. She takes calls, emails, and letters sent in through her radio station’s website from her listeners. She encourages and supports her listeners and receives musical dedication requests. It is based in the Pacific Northwest.

One of the cornerstones of the show is its use of callers. Most of the time the caller tells Delilah their situation or story and then Delilah chooses the song that she feels best matches the caller's situation. Callers are recorded during the show and replayed later, sometimes within the hour. Delilah also plays songs by direct request.

Originally heard only on weeknights, stations that carry the show have the option of carrying it six or even seven nights a week, with most stations airing at least one night of the weekend (usually Sunday) in addition to a weeknight show.

- Adult contemporary (AC): This is the most widely distributed version of the show between January and early November. It airs the usual adult contemporary music and is geared towards adults and their families. This is the version heard on most radio stations. It has also surfaced on hot adult contemporary and soft adult contemporary stations.
- Gold-based AC: A version of the show that features older adult contemporary hits.
- Christmas music: This is the only version that is produced between mid-November and Christmas.
- Christian adult contemporary (Christian AC) version: A version of the show featuring Christian adult contemporary music, specifically produced for stations and audiences favoring this genre.

The show includes "Friday Night Girls", where she honors groups of her regular female listeners with prizes. She occasionally also calls "Friday Night Girls" chapters and speaks with them live on the air.

She also airs a "Delilah Dilemma" each evening in the first and third hours of the broadcast, where she reads a dilemma submitted by a listener and offers advice on their situation.

=== Distribution ===
The program debuted on four stations at the beginning of 1996 and finished the year on a dozen stations. In 1997, Broadcast Programming started to distribute the program, which was later bought by Jones Radio Networks. Delilah moved to Premiere Radio Networks in 2004, where she remains to this day. There are nearly 170 radio stations, and the Armed Forces Radio Network, airing the program. Jane Bulman has been the executive producer of the show since its inception.

Many of the stations carrying the show are owned by Premiere parent iHeartMedia. In November 2006, WLTW in New York began carrying her. The version of the show that runs on WLTW is a separate, specially tailored version of the show produced just for that station, with music programmed by local WLTW Programming. In 2007, KODA Houston began carrying her show. In March 2012, she went on the air in Los Angeles on KFSH-FM, a Salem Broadcasting owned station playing Christian music. This addition debuted the Christian Music formatted version of the program. iHeartRadio has an online Delilah stream where listeners can hear the show all the time.

In October 2017, Delilah temporarily went on hiatus after the suicide of one of her children.

On January 26, 2018, Seattle soft AC station KSWD announced that Delilah would host middays on the station beginning January 29. The station also picked up her syndicated show for Friday, Saturday, and Sunday nights.

In 2021, Delilah purchased KDUN in her hometown of Reedsport, Oregon, which carried her syndicated show. She returned KDUN's license to the FCC in May 2025, citing the station's lack of commercial success.

=== Audience ===
The show is popular among women between the ages of 25 and 54. As of 2016, eight million people listen to the program at least once a week.

According to a Bloomberg interview, Delilah has seen her reported audience numbers plummet in cities where Nielsen Audio has adopted the Portable People Meter for tracking listenership.

=== In popular culture ===
The show plays a role in the Hallmark Channel television series Cedar Cove, which is based on writer Debbie Macomber's book series and set in a fictional Pacific coast town in Washington state. Quotes and other inspirational pieces voiced by Delilah, especially for the series set up some of the plot devices that occur in the course of each episode.

The show can be heard in the 2018 film I Can Only Imagine, the biographical story of MercyMe lead singer Bart Millard.

In episode 5 of season 3 of the TV show Louie, comedian Maria Bamford mentions listening to Delilah and does an impression of a back and forth between a caller and Delilah.

== Personal life ==
Delilah has been married four times and divorced three times. In October 2012, she married Paul Warner.

Delilah is the mother of 15 children, 12 of whom were adopted. Her son, Sammy Young Dzolali Rene, died on March 12, 2012, from complications from sickle-cell anemia at the age of 16. On October 3, 2017, her biological son Zachariah died by suicide at the age of 18. Her stepson Ryan died in December 2019.

She lives near Port Orchard, Washington.

== Awards and honors ==
Year	Name	Notes	Ref
2007	Syndicated Personality/Show of the Year award by Radio & Records magazine	Nominated	
2012	Gracie Award for Outstanding Host - Entertainment/Information in Radio.	Winner	
2016	Inducted into the National Radio Hall of Fame		
2016	National Association of Broadcasters (NAB) Marconi Award for Network/Syndicated Personality of the Year	Winner. Also nominated in 2008, 2013 and 2018.	
2017	Inducted into the NAB Broadcasting Hall of Fame		

== Books ==
Year	Name
2002	Love Someone Today: Encouragement and Inspiration for the Times of Our Lives
2008	Love Matters
2012	Arms Full of Love: Inspiring True Stories that Celebrate the Gift of Family
2018	One Heart at a Time: The Inspiring Journey of the Most Listened-To Woman on the Radio
