= CBG (AM) =

Radio station in Newfoundland and Labrador, Canada

- Gander, Newfoundland and Labrador; Canada
- Broadcast area: Central and Northeastern Newfoundland
- Frequency: 1400 kHz
- Branding: CBC Radio One

Programming
- Format: News/Talk

Ownership
- Owner: Canadian Broadcasting Corporation
- Sister stations: TV: CBGT-DT

History
- First air date: March 1943
- Former call signs: VORG (1943–1949)
- Former frequencies: 1450 kHz (1943–1983)
- Call sign meaning: Canadian Broadcasting Corporation Gander

Technical information
- Licensing authority: CRTC
- Class: B
- Power: 4,000 watts
- Transmitter coordinates: 48°57′59″N 54°39′10″W
- Repeater: see main article

Links
- Website: cbc.ca/nl

CBG (1400 AM) is a radio station broadcasting from Gander, Newfoundland and Labrador, Canada, with a power of 4,000 watts. CBG is the local Radio One station of the Canadian Broadcasting Corporation.

Three rebroadcasters provide additional coverage. One of the rebroadcasters, CBGY 750 in Bonavista is a Class A, 10,000-watt station, heard over much of Atlantic Canada at night, using a good radio.

== History ==
The station was launched in March 1943 as VORG (Voice of Radio Gander), owned and operated by the local military base. Before 1949 when it joined the Canadian Confederation, radio stations in Newfoundland had call signs beginning with VO. A few stations dating back to that time, such as VOCM, VOAR and VOWR still do.

Following World War II, VORG was acquired by the Broadcasting Corporation of Newfoundland (BCN), the pre-Confederation public broadcaster. On March 31, 1949, BCN was absorbed by the CBC when Newfoundland joined Canada, and the station adopted its current call sign. At that time, CBG broadcast on 1450 AM. The frequency was changed to 1400 in 1983.

In 2015, CBG moved out of its longtime CBC-owned studio at 98 Sullivan Avenue in Gander and into leased space at the Gander Mall. This coincided with the closure of separate studio facilities at CBT in Grand Falls-Windsor in a move to cut costs by consolidating CBC's central Newfoundland operations into a single, smaller facility in Gander.

== Local programming ==
Since 2018, CBG has cooperated with CBY in Corner Brook to produce CBC Newfoundland Morning, a local morning show focused on central and western Newfoundland, the Northern Peninsula, and southern Labrador. Prior to this, CBG produced and aired The Central Morning Show in cooperation with CBT in Grand Falls-Windsor.

For the remainder of local programming blocks within the CBC Radio One schedule, CBG broadcasts programming from CBN in St. John's.

== Transmitters ==
Rebroadcasters of CBG
City of licence	Identifier	Frequency	Power	Class	RECNet	Notes
Bonavista	CBGY	750 AM	10,000 watts	A	Query	48°40′27.12″N 53°46′18.84″W
Carmanville	CBGC-FM	92.5 FM	1,700 watts	A	Query	49°22′18.84″N 54°10′19.92″W
Glovertown	CBNG-FM	101.5 FM	547 vertical/1,276 horizontal watts	A	Query	48°40′39″N 54°4′14.88″W
