= KDUN =

- Reedsport, Oregon; United States
- Broadcast area: Central Oregon Coast
- Frequency: 1030 kHz

Ownership
- Owner: Delilah Rene; (Big Shoes Productions, Inc.)

History
- First air date: June 2, 1961
- Last air date: May 19, 2025
- Former call signs: KRDP (1961–1961); KRAF (1961–1970); KLLU (1997–2002)
- Former frequencies: 1470 kHz (1961–1998)
- Call sign meaning: Dune, for "Oregon Dunes"

Technical information
- Facility ID: 33779
- Class: B
- Power: 50,000 watts (day); 630 watts (night)
- Transmitter coordinates: 43°44′16.5″N 124°4′37.1″W

KDUN (1030 AM) was a commercial radio station licensed to Reedsport, Oregon, United States, serving the Central Oregon Coast. Last owned by Delilah Rene d/b/a Big Shoes Productions, it aired an oldies format at the time of closure branded "Dune Radio". The studios were located in the Oregon Coast School of Art building in Gardiner, Oregon.

Established in 1961 as KRAF, it adopted the KDUN calls in 1969. Nationally syndicated radio personality Delilah Rene began her career at KDUN in the 1970s and purchased it in 2021, operating it as a full-service station.

== History ==
=== KRAF ===
A construction permit was filed in September 1958 by Oregon Coast Broadcasters to build a new radio station licensed to Reedsport, Oregon. Its transmitter and studios would be located on Bolon Island. The permit was granted by the Federal Communications Commission (FCC) in March 1960 for a new daytime-only AM station, assigned the call letters KRDP. It would broadcast with 5,000 watts of power on a frequency of 1470 kHz. A request was made and granted in April 1961 to change the call sign to KRAF.

KRAF signed on the air on June 2, 1961. Walter J. Kraus was the president and owner of Oregon Coast Broadcasters and Gless Connoy was the station's general manager. The KRAF call sign represented the "Reedsport and Florence" coverage area of the station. The station was marketed with the slogan, "Listening is heavenly on 1470". The KRAF call letters were first filed for in 1936 by Edwin A. Kraft and had been licensed to KRAF in Fairbanks, Alaska.

In 1966, Gless Connoy purchased the station from Kraus. Wayne A. Moreland bought KRAF from the Connoy family on July 1, 1968.

=== KDUN ===
Wayne A. Moreland filed for and was granted a call letter change to KDUN in September 1969. Then Moreland's ownership of KRAF would prove short-lived. Brothers Steve and Jerome Kenagy's and J. Westley Morgan of Communications Broadcasting, Inc. were granted transfer of control on February 11, 1972. The new owners implemented a "middle of the road" (MOR) music format, with news and sports. The Kenagy brothers shifted ownership of KDUN in March 1972 to a new company named KDUN Radio, Inc. The brothers maintained the middle of the road music format through the rest of the 1970s.

In August 1973, KDUN was granted a construction permit to move the studio and transmitter site from Bolon Island (located on the site of a former drive-in movie theater) to Lower Smith River Road. The studios moved from the transmitter site into town in the early 1980s.

=== Move to 1030 ===
In March 1982, the station applied to the FCC for authorization to change from 1470 kHz to 1030 kHz. That was coupled with an increase in daytime signal power to 10,000 watts. A few technical changes would also be made to the antenna system. The FCC granted the station the construction permit to make those changes on May 7, 1987. KDUN began broadcasting at the lower frequency and higher power in February 1998 and received a license to cover the upgrades on April 18, 1998.

In April 1982, the Kenagy brothers applied to the FCC to transfer ownership of KDUN Radio, Inc., to their now-larger software company, Custom Business System, Inc. The transfer was approved by the FCC on April 23, 1982. In November 1985, CBSI announced that it was selling KDUN Radio, Inc., to Lyle and Eleanor A. Irons so that it could focus on the traffic and billing business. The deal was approved by the FCC on February 11, 1986, and the transaction was consummated on April 23, 1986.

=== KLLU ===
After a quarter-century of continuous corporate ownership, KDUN Radio, Inc., reached an agreement in June 1997 to sell the station to Shae Partners, LLC. The deal was approved by the FCC on August 5, 1997, and the transaction was consummated on September 15, 1997. The station's call sign was changed to KLLU on November 21, 1997.

In July 1999, Shae Partners, LLC, reached an agreement to sell the station to the F & L Broadcast Development Corporation for $200,000. The deal was approved by the FCC on August 24, 1999, and the transaction was consummated on August 29, 1999. Less than two weeks later, in early September 1999, F & L Broadcast Development Corporation reached an agreement to sell this station to Pamplin Communications Corporation subsidiary Pamplin Broadcasting-Oregon, Inc., for $350,000. The deal was approved by the FCC on October 29, 1999, and the transaction was consummated on November 1, 1999.

=== Back to KDUN ===
The station was granted a new construction permit in August 2000, this time to increase the daytime signal to 50,000 watts. KLLU began broadcasting at the higher power in March 2001 and the station received its license to cover the changes on June 18, 2001. The station was reassigned its heritage KDUN call letters by the Federal Communications Commission on September 25, 2002.

In January 2006, Pamplin Broadcasting-Oregon, Inc., CEO Robert Boisseau Pamplin Jr. reached an agreement to sell this station to Bill Schweitzer, doing business as WKS Broadcasting, Inc., for a cash price of $220,000. The deal was approved by the FCC on June 5, 2006, and the transaction was consummated on August 29, 2006. At the time of the sale, KDUN was broadcasting a country music format.

KDUN went temporarily silent on November 27, 2007. According to their April 2008 filing with the FCC, new owners for KDUN were being sought.

In May 2008, WKS Broadcasting, Inc., reached an agreement to sell the station to Sand & Sea Broadcasting, LLC. The deal was approved by the FCC on June 23, 2008, and the transaction was consummated on August 6, 2008. On September 1, 2013, KDUN was sold to Post Rock Communications, LLC.

=== Acquisition by Delilah ===
On May 3, 2021, Big Shoes Productions, a company owned by station alumnus and nationally-syndicated personality Delilah Rene, acquired KDUN from Post Rock Communications. The purchase was consummated on June 23, 2021. KDUN announced that it would return to air on September 6, 2021, with an oldies format and focusing on local news and information. A Reedsport native, Rene had originally worked at KDUN in the 1970s as her first job in radio, and saw the purchase as an opportunity to "give back to the community where I grew up". New studios were built in her former fifth grade classroom at what is now the "Oregon Coast School of Arts" in Gardiner, Oregon.

KDUN carried classic hits, Top 40 hits from the 1980s, 1970s, 1960s and the early 1990s which was overseen by Bob Larson. KDUN used the "YOU" series of jingles that were popular in the mid 1970s. Other programming that was added included Rick Dees and Seattle Seahawks football. In the evenings, the station carried Delilah's adult contemporary program seven days a week.

The FCC cancelled the KDUN license on May 19, 2025. In surrendering the license, Delilah Rene said that after three years, she was "not able to continue operating the radio station and provide the financial means to do so".

== Traffic and billing software ==
In 1975, KDUN's owners were frustrated by the massive volume of paperwork required for scheduling advertising, billing advertisers, and producing each day's commercial lineup, they purchased a Wang Laboratories minicomputer and, along with engineer Wes Lockard, invented software to handle these traffic and billing tasks. As the brothers took on these tasks for other stations in the area, they realized that a market for computerized traffic and billing existed and, in 1978, they founded Custom Business Systems, Inc. At its peak in the mid-1990s, CBSI software was in use by roughly half of the commercial radio stations in the United States and by broadcasters in 24 other countries. In 1999, it was described as the "World's largest supplier of business software for the radio broadcast industry". CBSI and the Kenagy brother's sold their interest in KDUN in 1985. Later the Kenagy brothers sold off CBSI to retire. CBSI itself was a part of Marketron Broadcast Solutions.
