= Broadcasting Corporation of Newfoundland =

Public broadcaster of the Dominion of Newfoundland

- Type: Radio network, public broadcaster
- Country: Dominion of Newfoundland

Programming
- Format: full service

Ownership
- Owner: Dominion of Newfoundland government
- Key people: William Fenton Galgay (general manager)

History
- Launch date: 1939
- Closed: 1949 (operations absorbed into CBC)

Coverage
- Availability: National

The Broadcasting Corporation of Newfoundland (BCN) was the government-owned public radio service of the dominion of Newfoundland. Following Newfoundland's admission as a province of Canada in 1949, the BCN was absorbed into the Canadian Broadcasting Corporation, and its three main AM radio transmitters remain in operation today as CBC Radio One stations.

== History ==
The radio service was founded in 1939 by the Commission of Government. Later that year, it bought the Dominion Broadcasting Company, owner of VONF (1195 kHz) in St. John's, from the Avalon Telephone Company, forerunner of NewTel. Not long after taking control, the corporation acquired two transmitters at Mount Pearl that had been built during World War I as Royal Navy HMS Wireless Station (BZM) for North Atlantic communications with Royal Navy ships. BCN's studios were at the sixth floor of the Hotel Newfoundland in St. John's.

For its entire existence, the BCN's general manager was William Fenton Galgay, who had founded Dominion Broadcasting in 1932 with Joseph Butler. Notable broadcasters also included Aubrey MacDonald, known as Aubry Mac, and the musician Robert MacLeod.

BCN accepted advertising on the station whose programming consisted of commercial, educational and entertainment shows. Notable programmes included future Newfoundland Premier Joey Smallwood's The Barrelman, which spun information and history with island folklore, and the Gerald S. Doyle News Bulletin, which interspersed family and community news about islanders with more serious journalism.

In 1943, the BCN opened a second radio station, VOWN in Corner Brook and, after the war, acquired VORG in Gander that had previously been operated by the wartime Canadian military base.

The BCN provided islanders with news of World War II as well as serving as a disseminator of wartime propaganda and as a recruitment tool for the armed forces. After the war, the network provided gavel to gavel coverage of the proceedings of the 1946-1948 Newfoundland National Convention that was elected to determine the future of the dominion. While these broadcasts were closely followed by Newfoundlanders, the loss of advertising revenue from the commercial-free broadcasts hampered BCN's ability to improve its programming.

One of BCN's final acts was to cover the referendums of June 3 and July 22, 1948, on the dominion's future. As the result was to join Canadian Confederation, the facilities and staff of the BCN were transferred to the Canadian Broadcasting Corporation on April 1, 1949, when Newfoundland joined Canada. VONF was renamed CBN, VORG became CBG and VOWN became CBY. Bill Galgay remained as the CBC's Newfoundland regional director until his death in 1966.

All three stations remain in operation as of 2020 as CBC Radio One stations. To this day, all Radio One stations in Newfoundland and Labrador essentially operate as a subsystem within the Radio One network; they simulcast most of CBN's programming during Radio One's local programming blocks.

A CBC Radio comedy series in the 1990s, The Great Eastern, reimagined the BCN as still being in operation as Newfoundland's own independent public broadcaster; it was presented in the format of a parodic arts and culture newsmagazine show produced by the BCN.

== Facilities ==
HQ - 6th floor Hotel Newfoundland 1939-1949

=== Stations ===
- Corner Brook - VOWN (AM790), 1943–1949
- Gander - VORG (1450 AM), mid-1940s-1949
- St. John's - VONF (840 and 640 AM), 1939–1949

=== Shortwave relays ===
- VONG (9.47 MHz, later 9.48 MHz) 1940-?, now defunct
- VONH (5.98 MHz, later 5.97 MHz) 1940s, became CBNX in 1949, now CKZN

=== Transmitters ===
- Mount Pearl (2)

== Programming ==
The BCN's programming, primarily through its main station VONF (Voice of Newfoundland) in St. John's, covered a variety of genres and served as a crucial source of information and entertainment during the challenging periods of the Great Depression and the Second World War. The BCN provided vital news coverage, keeping Newfoundlanders informed about local issues and global events, including Winston Churchill's speeches and coverage of the 1939 Royal Visit. A primary goal of the BCN was to use radio as a tool for social improvement and education, fitting into the Commission of Government's agenda to prepare the country for a return to responsible government. For music, programming included a mix of classical and popular music. The network offered dramatic theatre and programming featuring local artists, teachers, and musicians, fostering local cultural expression.The influence of earlier church-operated stations (like VOWR and VONA) meant there was a continued overlap and integration of secular and religious content in broadcasting. Sports information was part of the diverse content offered. While focusing on local content, BCN programming was influenced by the availability of content from powerful American, British, and Canadian stations, which Newfoundlanders could also receive.

=== Schedule ===
Time	Date(s)						
Time	Sunday	Monday	Tuesday	Wednesday	Thursday	Friday	Saturday
6:00	Sign On						
6:05	BCN News & Weather						
6:15	The Crack Host						
7:00	Day In, Day Out						
9:00	BCNAM						
10:00	University of the Air						
12:00	BCN Kids						
2:00	NFSE Stock Market Report						
2:39	Local Programming						
7:00	BCN News						
8:00	Nocturnal Emissions						
9:13	Sign Off						
