= CBN (AM) =

CBC Radio One station in St. John's, Newfoundland and Labrador

- St. John's, Newfoundland and Labrador; Canada
- Broadcast area: Southern and Southeastern Newfoundland
- Frequency: 640 kHz

Programming
- Format: News/Talk
- Network: CBC Radio One

Ownership
- Owner: Canadian Broadcasting Corporation
- Sister stations: CBN-FM, CBNT-DT

History
- First air date: November 14, 1932
- Former call signs: VONF (1932–1949)
- Former frequencies: 1195 kHz (1932–1939)
- Call sign meaning: Canadian Broadcasting Corporation Newfoundland

Technical information
- Licensing authority: CRTC
- Class: A
- Power: 10,000 watts
- Transmitter coordinates: 47°34′10.3″N 52°48′45.3″W
- Repeater: see main article

Links
- Website: cbc.ca/nl

CBN (640 AM) is a radio station licensed to St. John's, Newfoundland and Labrador, Canada. It carries a news, talk and information format and is the local Radio One station of the Canadian Broadcasting Corporation.

CBN is a Class A station broadcasting on a clear-channel frequency, with a transmitter sited off Thorburn Road near Exit 44 of the Outer Ring Road on the Trans-Canada Highway. With its non-directional signal and low dial frequency, CBN is broadcast by day around most of Southeastern Newfoundland. At night, it can be picked up across much of the eastern half of North America with a good radio, but is strongest in Atlantic Canada and Eastern Quebec.

CBN programming is broadcast in St. John's on CBN-1-FM on 88.5 MHz. For listeners who have trouble picking up CBN 640's signal clearly in the downtown area, this "nested rebroadcaster" provides an alternative. CBN-1-FM has an effective radiated power (ERP) of 3,162 watts. This station is not to be confused with CBN-FM on 106.9 MHz, which carries the CBC Music network, or its rebroadcaster CBN-FM-1 on 90.7 MHz in Grand Falls-Windsor.

== History ==
The station began broadcasting at 8 p.m. on November 14, 1932 as VONF (Voice Of NewFoundland), on 1195 kHz, and was owned and operated by the Dominion Broadcasting Company, a subsidiary of the Avalon Telephone Company (a predecessor of Bell Aliant). In 1934, it merged with a former competitor, VOGY 840, which had also launched in 1932. The VONF call sign was retained.

On March 13, 1939, the Dominion Broadcasting Company was absorbed by the Broadcasting Corporation of Newfoundland, the pre-Confederation public broadcaster, as its first radio station. The frequency was eventually changed to its current 640 kHz.

BCN was absorbed by the CBC on March 31, 1949 when Newfoundland joined Canada. The call sign was then changed to CBN.

CBN used to operate 10,000-watt AM rebroadcaster CBNM in Marystown on 740 kHz (previously 570); however, this station converted to the FM band on 90.3 MHz in the 1980s.

CBN is currently the largest Radio One station in eastern Canada that is still located on the AM band, along with CBY in Corner Brook, which also operates with 10,000 watts and has clear channel designation.

Until April 27, 2007, CBN's operations were located on 342 Duckworth Street. Those operations are currently located on 95 University Avenue, where the television operations are also based.

== Local programming ==
The station's local shows include The St. John's Morning Show with Jen White, The Signal with Adam Walsh, On The Go with Krissy Holmes, The Broadcast with Paula Gale, and Weekend AM with Heather Barrett.

The province's other five Radio One stations (CBG Gander, CBT-FM Grand Falls-Windsor, CBY Corner Brook, CFGB-FM Happy Valley-Goose Bay and CBDQ-FM Labrador City) simulcast most of CBN's local programming during Radio One's local programming blocks. However, some of these Newfoundland and Labrador CBC stations have their own morning show or share one with another station.

One of VONF's most popular shows in the 1930s and 1940s was The Barrelman, hosted by future Premier Joey Smallwood.

=== Shortwave relay ===
Beginning in 1939, VONF operated a shortwave relay for remote areas of Newfoundland using the call sign VONG and operating on a frequency of 9.47 MHz (later 9.48, both in the 31-meter band). A second frequency of 5.98 MHz (later 5.97, both in the 49-meter band) was launched using the call sign VONH.

Eventually, VONG left the air and only VONH remained. The call sign changed to CBNX in 1949 when the AM station became CBN. The frequency was changed to 6.16 MHz in 1963. In 1965, the call sign was changed to CKZN, recognizing that, technically, the CB call sign prefix was and is still assigned to Chile on an international basis.

In 1989, the shortwave relay began to rebroadcast CFGB-FM in Happy Valley-Goose Bay, part-time as well as CBN. Eventually, in 1994, the station no longer relayed CBN, and became a full-time rebroadcaster of CFGB-FM. Most of Newfoundland had reliable AM or FM reception by that time, so the relay's main use was now limited to the remote areas of Labrador.

== Rebroadcasters ==
CBN has the following rebroadcasters:

Rebroadcasters of CBN
City of licence	Identifier	Frequency	RECNet	Notes
Clarenville	CBNL-FM	93.7 FM	Query	48°7′40.08″N 53°56′29.04″W
Marystown	CBNM-FM	90.3 FM	Query	47°8′39.12″N 55°8′48.12″W
Swift Current	CBNO-FM	104.3 FM	Query	47°52′53.04″N 54°12′15.84″W
Ramea	CBNR-FM	95.5 FM	Query	47°31′6.96″N 57°23′26.88″W
St. Alban's	CBNS-FM	99.1 FM	Query	47°51′43.92″N 55°51′18″W
Trepassey	CBNQ-FM	95.3 FM	Query	46°43′54.84″N 53°24′45″W
Fermeuse	CBNU-FM	104.3 FM	Query	46°57′47.88″N 52°56′57.84″W
Placentia	CBNV-FM	94.1 FM	Query	47°13′51.96″N 53°58′51.96″W
St. Vincent's	CBNX-FM	92.1 FM	Query	46°47′6″N 53°37′8.04″W
Burgeo	CIBB-FM	89.3 FM	Query	47°37′8.04″N 57°37′58.08″W
St. John's	CBN-1-FM	88.5 FM	Query	47°32′3.84″N 52°47′21.12″W

CBND was used by a former low-power AM rebroadcasting transmitter in Flower's Cove, which had operated on 790 kHz in 1972 to rebroadcast the programming of CBN. In 1968, CBND was approved to move from 600 to 920 kHz according to the Canadian Communications Foundation's CBN website. It is unknown when CBND signed on and when it left the air, however, there is a CBND-FM currently operating on 105.1 MHz in Postville which rebroadcasts CFGB-FM Happy Valley-Goose Bay.

CIBB-FM rebroadcasts programming of CBN, although it is owned by the Burgeo Broadcasting System.

In March 2016, The CBC made the decision to put a nested rebroadcaster in St. John's. It would broadcast at 88.5 MHz with an ERP of 3,612 Watts. On July 5 of the same year, the station went on-air for testing. On August 1, 2016, the CRTC approved the decision to put a nested rebroadcaster in St. John's. CBN-1-FM began broadcasting on October 28, 2016.
