= CBY (AM) =

Radio station in Newfoundland and Labrador, Canada

- Corner Brook, Newfoundland and Labrador; Canada
- Broadcast area: Western Newfoundland, Northern Peninsula
- Frequency: 990 kHz
- Branding: CBC Radio One

Programming
- Format: News/Talk

Ownership
- Owner: Canadian Broadcasting Corporation
- Sister stations: Former: CBYT

History
- First air date: July 5, 1943
- Former call signs: VOWN (1943–1949)
- Former frequencies: 840 kHz (1943–1947); 790 kHz (1947–1963)
- Call sign meaning: Canadian Broadcasting Corporation Y

Technical information
- Licensing authority: CRTC
- Class: A
- Power: 10,000 watts
- Transmitter coordinates: 48.9328°N 57.9061°W
- Repeater: see main article

Links
- Website: cbc.ca/nl

CBY (990 AM) is a radio station licensed to Corner Brook, Newfoundland and Labrador, Canada. It is owned by the Canadian Broadcasting Corporation and it carries the CBC's Radio One network. The transmitter is off the Trans-Canada Highway near Massey Drive in Corner Brook.

CBY is a clear-channel/Class A station, transmitting with 10,000 watts, using a non-directional antenna. By day, the signal covers most of Western Newfoundland. At night, with a good radio, it can be heard around the Maritime Provinces and parts of Quebec and New England. Nine FM rebroadcasters provide additional coverage throughout Western Newfoundland and the Northern Peninsula.

== History ==
Before Newfoundland joined the Canadian Confederation in 1949, Newfoundland radio stations had call signs beginning with VO. Thus, what is now CBY was launched with the call sign VOWN, standing for the Voice Of West Newfoundland, on July 5, 1943 during a public ceremony attended by about two hundred guests in the ballroom of the Glynmill Inn. The broadcast opened with a rendition of Ode to Newfoundland played by the Corner Brook Militia Band, followed by a recorded address from Sir Humphrey Walwyn, Governor of Newfoundland.

The station originally broadcast on a frequency of 840 kHz and was owned by the Broadcasting Corporation of Newfoundland. Following a power increase from 250 watts to 1,000 watts on March 23, 1947, the station began broadcasting on 790 kHz.

On March 31, 1949, the Broadcasting Corporation of Newfoundland was absorbed by the Canadian Broadcasting Corporation when Newfoundland joined Canada. Consequently, VOWN adopted its present call sign. In 1963, the station began broadcasting on 990 kHz.

CBNA St. Anthony signed on the air on August 2, 1969 on 600 kHz; it has since moved to the FM band on 100.3 MHz.

On October 19, 2012, CBY made its final broadcast from its longtime studios of 53 years on Premier Drive in Corner Brook after the announcement of budget cuts by the federal government. The station is now located in the Valley Mall, a decision that drew much criticism mostly because of the size of the new studios. The former CBC location was a building, owned and operated by the CBC.

On August 29, 2025, the CBC filed an application to the CRTC to move CBY 990 to 106.7 MHz. The CRTC approved the application on August 28, 2026.

== Local programming ==
Since 2018, CBY has cooperated with CBG in Gander to produce CBC Newfoundland Morning, a local morning show focused on central and western Newfoundland, the Northern Peninsula, and southern Labrador. Prior to this, CBY produced its own morning show called The West Coast Morning Show.

For the remainder of local programming blocks within the CBC Radio One schedule, CBY broadcasts programming from CBN in St. John's.

== Transmitters ==
Rebroadcasters of CBY
City of licence	Identifier	Frequency	Power	Class	RECNet	Notes
Bonne Bay	CBNF-FM	89.1 FM	2900 watts	A	Query	49°33′11.16″N 57°53′21.12″W
Deer Lake	CBDT-FM	96.3 FM	1175 watts	A	Query	49°14′21.84″N 57°28′26.04″W
Mount St. Margaret	CBYM-FM	98.7 FM	10000 watts	B	Query	51°1′5.16″N 56°48′42.84″W
Port aux Basques	CBNE-FM	91.9 FM	1280 watts	A	Query	47°34′49.08″N 59°8′42″W
Port Saunders	CBNJ-FM	90.5 FM	261 watts	A	Query	50°38′57.84″N 57°17′44.16″W
Portland Creek	CBYP-FM	89.5 FM	850 watts	A	Query	50°8′42″N 57°37′37.92″W
St. Andrew's	CBNH-FM	93.7 FM	2700 watts	A	Query	47°48′11.88″N 59°17′20.04″W
St. Anthony	CBNA-FM	100.3 FM	4500 watts	A	Query	51°21′12.96″N 55°33′56.16″W
Stephenville	CBNC-FM	88.7 FM	3600 watts	B	Query	48°35′22.92″N 58°39′43.92″W

On May 27, 1986, the CRTC approved the CBC's application to change CBNE from 1370 to 1420 kHz. CBNE was later converted to 91.9 MHz on February 15, 1989.

On February 5, 2018, the CRTC approved the CBC's application to convert CBNA 600 to 100.3 MHz with an effective radiated power of 4,500 watts (non-directional antenna with an effective height of the antenna above average terrain of 173 metres). The licensee also stated that the new FM transmitter will reach a greater population than the existing AM signal.

== CBY call sign history ==
The call sign CBY was previously used by a CBL rebroadcaster in Toronto from 1938 to 1943.
