= Barrelman =

Colloquialism for a lookout stationed in the masthead of a seavessel

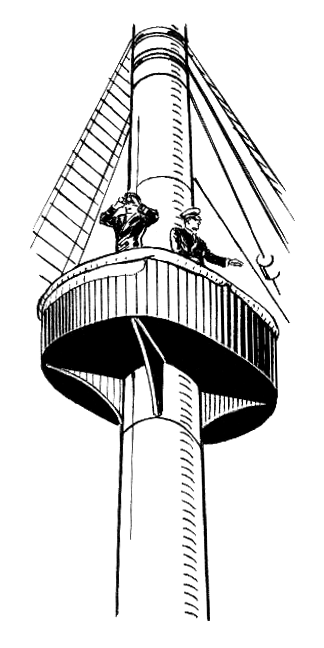
Manning the crow's nest.

Barrelman is in reference to a person who would be stationed in the barrel of the foremast or crow's nest of an oceangoing vessel as a navigational aid. In early ships the crow's nest was simply a barrel or a basket lashed to the tallest mast. Later it became a specially designed platform with protective railing.

== History ==
According to a popular naval legend, the term derives from the practice of Viking sailors, who carried crows or ravens in a cage secured to the top of the mast. In cases of poor visibility, a crow was released, and the navigator plotted a course corresponding to the bird's flight path because the crow invariably headed towards the nearest land. Some naval scholars have found no evidence of the masthead crow cage and suggest the name was coined simply because the lookout platform resembled a crow's nest in a tree. As ships grew in size and complexity, that station came to be mounted on the highest mast of the oceangoing vessel, and it came to be known as the crow's nest. The simplest construction to providing a lookout and setting course direction for the ship was to lash a barrel to the mast. A member of the crew experienced in the matters of navigation was charged with manning this perch and came to be colloquially known as a barrelman.

In Newfoundland the term barrelman was synonymous with the word scunner.

== See also ==
- Glossary of nautical terms (disambiguation)
