= List of CBC radio AM transmitters in Canada =

This article is a list of full-power and low-power CBC Radio AM-only transmitters in Canada for the CBC Radio One and Première Chaîne networks which are still in operation on AM radio frequencies as of 2018. There are a total of about 100 AM transmitters which are still in operation by the CBC across Canada. As there may be some transmitters missing from the list below, this list may not necessarily be complete. Since the 1980s, a vast number of CBC full- and low-power AM transmitters have already moved to the FM band, with some new FM transmitters being added. It is possible that all or most of these AM transmitters listed below may eventually move to the FM band or completely cease broadcasting in the near future.

== British Columbia ==
=== CBC Radio One ===
==== Full-power ====
- CBU 690 AM Vancouver (also broadcasts in FM to some of its coverage area on nested transmitters, including to Greater Vancouver, Abbotsford, and Chilliwack)
- CFPR 860 AM Prince Rupert

==== Low-power ====
- CBKA 1450 AM Stewart
- CBKG 920 AM Granisle
- CBKJ 860 AM Gold River
- CBKM 860 AM Blue River
- CBKN 990 AM Shalalth
- CBKO 540 AM Coal Harbour
- CBKU 630 AM Sayward
- CBKY 1350 AM Keremeos
- CBKZ 860 AM Clearwater
- CBPM 1260 AM Sicamous
- CBRH 1170 AM New Hazelton
- CBRK 900 AM Kimberley
- CBRZ 1350 AM Bralorne
- CBTG 860 AM Gold Bridge
- CBUG 860 AM Kaslo
- CBUN 740 AM Salmo
- CBUP 860 AM Merritt
- CBWF 920 AM Mackenzie
- CBXA 1150 AM Mica Dam
- CBYW 540 AM Wells
- CFHG 1490 AM Holberg

== Alberta ==
=== CBC Radio One ===
==== Full-power ====
- CBR 1010 AM Calgary (also broadcasts in FM to some of its coverage area on a nested transmitter)
- CBX 740 AM Edmonton (also broadcasts in FM to some of its coverage area on a nested transmitter)

==== Low-power ====
As of February 2013, all the remaining CBC low-power AM transmitters in Alberta have received approval from the CRTC to convert to the FM band.

== Saskatchewan ==
=== CBC Radio One ===
==== Full-power ====
- CBK 540 AM Watrous (also broadcasts in FM into some of its coverage area on nested transmitters, including Regina and Saskatoon)

=== Première Chaîne ===
==== Full-power ====
- CBKF-1 690 AM Gravelbourg
- CBKF-2 860 AM Saskatoon

== Manitoba ==
=== CBC Radio One ===
==== Full-power ====
- CBW 990 AM Winnipeg (also broadcasts in FM to some of its coverage area on a nested transmitter)

==== Low-power ====
- CFNC 1490 AM Cross Lake (rebroadcasts the programming of CBWK-FM, but are owned by local community groups rather than by the CBC).
- CHFC 1230 AM Churchill

=== Première Chaîne ===
==== Full-power ====
- CKSB 1050 AM Winnipeg (also operated on FM to some of its coverage area on a nested transmitter) (Both AM transmitter and nested transmitter had moved to 88.1 MHz).

==== Low-power ====
- CKSB-2 860 AM St. Lazare

== Ontario ==
=== CBC Radio One ===
==== Low-power ====
- CBES 690 AM Ignace
- CBLE 1240 AM Beardmore
- CBLF 1450 AM Foleyet
- CBLO 1240 AM Mattawa

=== Première Chaîne ===
==== Full-power ====
- CJBC 860 AM Toronto
- CBEF 1550 AM Windsor (also operates on a nested FM transmitter). On November 1, 2012, CBEF began broadcasting on 1550 AM, moving over from 540.

==== Low-power ====
- CBOF-4 1400 AM Rolphton (Moving to FM 98.5; approved November 28, 2022)
- CBON-12 1090 AM Mattawa

== Quebec ==
Note that due to a vast number of CBC low-power AM transmitters in Quebec, the repeaters of CBF, CBSI and CBVE are not listed here and it's uncertain if most of these transmitters are still currently in operation. It's also uncertain if most of the CBC transmitters listed below are still in operation.

=== CBC Radio One ===
==== Low-power ====
- CBOM 710 AM Maniwaki (Moving to FM 93.3; approved June 1, 2022)
- CBMD 1400 AM Chapais

=== Première Chaîne ===
==== Low-power ====
- CBJ-2 1140 AM Chapais
- CBF-16 990 AM Clova (formerly CBV-3) (Moving to FM)
- CBF-17 710 AM Lac-Édouard (formerly CBV-2) On November 17, 2021, the CBC submitted an application to the CRTC to move CBF-17 Lac-Édouard, Quebec from the AM band 710 kHz to the FM band at 99.9 MHz. This application is pending CRTC approval.
- CBOF-1 990 AM Maniwaki (Moving to FM 94.3; approved June 1, 2022)
- CBSI-14 1350 AM Aguanish (Moving to FM)
- CBSI-5 1100 AM Natashquan (Moved to 99.9 FM)
- CBF-18 710 AM Parent (formerly CBV-1 1240 AM)
- CBSI-23 1130 AM Port-Menier
- CBSI-8 1550 AM La Romaine (Moving to FM)

== Prince Edward Island ==
There are no CBC-owned AM transmitters on Prince Edward Island for CBC Radio One and Première Chaîne. However, there are two CBC-owned tourist information AM stations located in Prince Edward Island National Park: CBPP 1490 AM and CBPP-1 1280 AM

== Nova Scotia ==
=== CBC Radio One ===
==== Full-Power ====
- CBI 1140 AM Sydney

== Newfoundland and Labrador ==
=== CBC Radio One ===
==== Full-power ====
- CBG 1400 AM Gander
- CBGY 750 AM Bonavista
- CBN 640 AM St. John's
- CBY 990 AM Corner Brook

==== Low-power ====
As of 2018, all remaining CBC low-power AM transmitters in Newfoundland and Labrador have received approval from the CRTC to convert to the FM band.

== Yukon ==
=== CBC Radio One ===
==== Full-power ====
- CBDN 560 AM Dawson City

==== Low-power ====
- CBDB 990 AM Watson Lake
- CBDK 940 AM Teslin
- CBDM 690 AM Beaver Creek
- CBQF 990 AM Carmacks
- CBQJ 990 AM Ross River

== Northwest Territories ==
=== CBC Radio One ===
==== Full-power ====
- CFYK 1340 AM Yellowknife (application submitted to CRTC in July 2012 for FM conversion)
- CHAK 860 AM Inuvik

==== Low-power ====
- CBQG 1280 AM Wrigley

== Nunavut ==
=== CBC Radio One/CBC North ===
==== Full-power ====
- CFFB 1230 AM Iqaluit (also broadcasts in FM to some of its coverage area on a nested transmitter)

==== Low-power ====
- CBIA 640 AM Gjoa Haven

== See also ==
- List of defunct CBC radio transmitters in Canada
- Canadian Broadcasting Corporation
