= List of defunct CBC radio transmitters in Canada =

This is a list of former radio transmitters across Canada that were used by the Canadian Broadcasting Corporation. Most of the former transmitters operated on the AM dial as low-power relay transmitters (LPRT's), which were added to vast remote communities on the AM dial, initially 20 watts of power when they first went on the air during World War II and were later boosted to 40 watts. Since the 1980s, most of the CBC AM LPRT's, including medium and high-power AM transmitters have either moved to the FM dial or shut down completely in which the trend continues today.

Note that only a few FM transmitters listed below had shut down as well due to various reasons.

== CBC Radio One ==
=== Alberta ===
| Call sign | Frequency | City of License | CRTC Decisions |
| CBRB | 860 AM | Banff | 2005-225 |
| CBXL | 860 AM | Blairmore | 2013-410 |
| CBXC | 1450 AM | Coleman | 2013-1; 2013-410 |
| CBXD | 1540 AM | Edson | 2013-31 |
| CBKE | 1450 AM | Fort Chipewyan | 2013-342 |
| CBXC | 1460 AM | Fort Vermilion | 2013-31 |
| CBWI | 1450 AM | Grande Cache | 2013-31 |
| CBXI | 730 AM | Hinton | 84-743 |
| CBKD | 1230 AM | High Level | 86-369; 2013-31 |
| CBXJ | 860 AM | Jasper | 2004-492 |
| CBXH | 1450 AM | John D'Or Prairie (Jean D’Or) | 2013-566 |
| CBXX | 1240 AM | Rainbow Lake | 2013-31 |
| CBKF | 1450 AM | Waterways - Fort McMurray | |
=== British Columbia ===
| Call sign | Frequency | City of License | CRTC Decisions |
| CBKL | 1150 AM | Alice Arm | 2013-566 |
| CBWA | 860 AM | Ashcroft | 2018-147 |
| CBTB | 630 AM | Bella Bella | 93-721 |
| CBRZ | 1350 AM | Bralorne | 93-3; 2012-187 |
| CBKS | 1450 AM | Cache Creek | 2018-147 |
| CBDG | 1560 AM | Cassiar | 85-551 87-25 |
| CBUD | 1080 AM | Castlegar | |
| CBUH | 860 AM | Chase | 99-434; 2013-410 |
| CBUZ | 1170 AM | Chetwynd | 94-816 |
| CBRI | 1080 AM | Christina Lake | 89-758 |
| CBUU | 1070 AM | Clinton | 2017-216 |
| CBXH | 1540 AM | Cooper Creek | |
| CBRR | 860 AM | Cranbrook | |
| CBRM | 740 AM | Creston | 86-723 |
| CBWD | 900 AM | Donald | |
| CBXW | 860 AM | Edgewood | 2013-410 |
| CBRD | 860 AM | Field | 2011-775; 2013-410 |
| CBDA | 1560 AM | Fort Nelson | 86-159 |
| CBUV | 1070 AM | Fort St. James | 93-722 |
| CBUW | 1170 AM | Fort St. John | |
| CBRJ | 860 AM | Grand Forks | 89-760 |
| CBRO | 740 AM | Greenwood | 89-760 |
| CBXU | 940 AM | Hudson's Hope | 2015-507 |
| CBKW | 740 AM | Jaffray | |
| CBKU | 630 AM | Kelsey Bay (Sayward) | |
| CBKY | 1350 AM | Keremeos | |
| CBTD | 990 AM | Kispiox | 2012-159; 2013-410 |
| CBKK | 630 AM | Kitwanga | 96-153 |
| CBUY | 1340 AM | Lac la Hache | |
| CBUL | 860 AM | Lillooet | 2013-410 |
| CBRE | 1080 AM | Lytton | 84-547 |
| CBXM | 860 AM | McBride | 89-759 |
| *CBUP | 860 AM | Merritt | 2022-285 |
| CBXS | 1150 AM | Midway | 89-760 |
| CBUM | 900 AM | Nakusp | 2017-407; 2019-324 |
| CBXN | 1400 AM | Natal | |
| CBUI | 740 AM | New Denver | 88-856; 2014-488 |
| CBRN | 740 AM | North Bend | |
| CBKR | 740 AM | Parson | 2013-566 |
| CBXK | 1240 AM | Pemberton | 2013-410 |
| CBUX | 1170 AM | Port Alice | 2017-77 |
| CBRW | 630 AM | Port Hardy | 93-723 |
| CBRP | 860 AM | Princeton | 88-766 |
| CBKV | 900 AM | Radium Hot Springs | 88-767 |
| CBRA | 840 AM | Revelstoke | 94-119 |
| CBUC | 860 AM | Salmon Arm | 88-855 |
| CBUJ | 860 AM | Slocan | 88-856 |
| CBKX | 1080 AM | Sorrento | 99-434 |
| CBRU | 1270 AM | Squamish | 2006-275 |
| CBXP | 1240 AM | Tahsis | 2009-710 |
| CBRC | 1170 AM | Terrace | |
| CBXZ | 630 AM | Tofino | |
| CBXQ | 540 AM | Ucluelet | 2015-465 |
| CBKI | 1350 AM | Valemount | |
| CBRL | 860 AM | Williams Lake | 2013-672 |
| CBUQ | 860 AM | Windermere Lake | 88-767 |
=== Manitoba ===
| Call sign | Frequency | City of License | CRTC Decisions |
| CBWG | 1400 AM | Gillam | 87-444 |
| CBDU | 1170 AM | Lynn Lake | 87-445 |
| CBDS | 690 AM | Pukatawagan | 2008-108 |
| CBWB | 690 AM | Wabowden | 92-491 |
=== New Brunswick ===
| Call sign | Frequency | City of License | CRTC Decisions |
| CBAN | 1140 AM | Andover | 88-76 |
| CBAM | 1320 AM | Edmundston | 2003-412 |
| CBZ | 970 AM | Fredericton (high-power) | 2002-460 |
| CBAB | 1350 AM | Grand Falls | 88-76 |
| CBAX | 600 AM | McAdam | 2017-396 |
| CBA | 1070 AM | Moncton (high-power; clear channel Class A) | 2007-8 |
| CBAO | 990 AM | St. Stephen | 2013-590 |
| CBAW | 740 AM | St. George | 88-76 |
| CBD | 1110 AM | Saint John | 87-569 |
| CBAD | 990 AM | Tobique Valley | 88-76 |
=== Newfoundland and Labrador ===
| Call sign | Frequency | City of License | CRTC Decisions |
| CBNF | 740 AM | Bonne Bay/Woody Point | 85-1275 |
| CBNK | 570 AM | Cartwright | 2013-552 |
| CBQA | 610 AM | Churchill Falls | 88-206 |
| CBND | unknown | Flower's Cove | |
| CBNG | 1090 AM | Glovertown | 2006-104 |
| CBT | 540 AM | Grand Falls-Windsor | 2022-14 |
| CFGB | 1340 AM | Happy Valley-Goose Bay | |
| CBNN | 1490 AM | Hopedale | 84-561 |
| CBDQ | 1490 AM | Labrador City | 95-707 |
| CBNM | 740 AM | Marystown | 90-473 |
| CBNX | 740 AM | Nain | 2016-360 |
| CBNE | 1420 AM | Port aux Basques | 86-475; 88-690 |
| CBNH | 1340 AM | Searston | 94-227 |
| CBNA | 600 AM | St. Anthony | 2018-46 |
| CBNB | 740 AM | St. Fintan's | |
=== Northwest Territories ===
| Call sign | Frequency | City of License | CRTC Decisions |
| CBAK | 1210 AM | Aklavik | 2019-149 |
| CBQO | 1230 AM | Deline | 94-167 |
| CBQE | 920 AM | Fort Good Hope | 94-563 |
| CBQM | 690 AM | Fort McPherson | 2013-499 |
| CBQC | 1230 AM | Fort Providence | 2013-500 |
| CBQD | 1150 AM | Fort Resolution | 94-804 |
| CBDO | 690 AM | Fort Simpson | 2013-553 |
| CBDI | 860 AM | Fort Smith | 2017-76 |
| CBDJ | 1490 AM | Hay River | 88-20 |
| CBDW | 990 AM | Norman Wells | 2017-215 |
| CBDV | 880 AM | Pine Point | 87-752; 1988-183 |
| CBQB | 1200 AM | Rae-Edzo | |
| CBQI | 690 AM | Tulita | 2013-227 |
| CBAC | 1150 AM | Tuktoyaktuk | 2014-468 |
=== Nova Scotia ===
| Call sign | Frequency | City of License | CRTC Decisions |
| CBAC | 540 AM | Barrington | |
| CBAR | 1230 AM | Canso | |
| CBH | 860 AM | Halifax (high-power) | 86-709 |
| CBAU | 1370 AM | Larry's River | |
| CBHD | 740 AM | Lockeport | 88-644 |
| CBAV | 1240 AM | Sable River | 88-644 |
| CBAZ | 1230 AM | Sheet Harbour | 85-518 |
| CBAP | 1140 AM | Shelburne | 88-644 |
=== Nunavut ===
| Call sign | Frequency | City of License | CRTC Decisions |
| CBQR | 1160 AM | Rankin Inlet | 87-230 |
=== Ontario ===
| Call sign | Frequency | City of License | CRTC Decisions |
| CBOL | 1450 AM | Armstrong | 2013-229 |
| CBLA | 1490 AM | Atikokan | |
| CBLV | 600 AM | Bancroft | 2014-488 |
| CBEQ | 1340 AM | Barry's Bay | |
| CBEZ | 1240 AM | Britt | 91-60 95-214 |
| CBLC | 1090 AM | Chapleau | 86-732 |
| CBLI | 1110 AM | Deep River | 2014-504 |
| CBLD | 1010 AM | Dryden | |
| CBOI | 690 AM | Ear Falls | 2018-45 |
| CBEC | 1090 AM | Elliot Lake | 88-865 |
| CBLP | 1240 AM | Espanola | |
| CBEW | 1400 AM | Fraserdale | |
| CBLG | 730 AM | Geraldton | 86-1136 |
| CBLY | 1400 AM | Haliburton | 86-985; 89-765 |
| CBLZ | 1400 AM | Hearst | |
| CBLH | 1010 AM | Hornepayne | 2013-228 |
| CBQW | 1340 AM | Hudson | 2013-190; 2013-410 |
| CBOK | 1090 AM | Kapuskasing | |
| CBLQ | 1450 AM | Latchford | 85-48; 96-723 |
| CBLL | 1400 AM | Longlac | |
| CBEB | 1010 AM | Manitouwadge | 87-735 |
| CBLM | 1090 AM | Marathon | 2017-175 |
| CBOD | 1400 AM | Maynooth | 89-612 |
| CBCM-FM | 107.5 FM | Midland/Penetanguishene | |
| CBEN | 540 AM | Mindemoya | |
| CBEY | 1340 AM | Moosonee | 2016-233 |
| CBCO-FM | 105.9 FM | Orillia | 88-487 |
| CBO | 920 AM | Ottawa (high-power) | 89-835 |
| CBCD-FM | 96.7 FM | Pembroke | 94-932 |
| CBLR | 1010 AM | Red Rock | |
| CBEO | 1230 AM | Rolphton | |
| CBLB | 1340 AM | Schreiber | 2019-142 |
| CBLS | 1240 AM | Sioux Lookout | 2013-190; 2013-410 |
| CBED | 1400 AM | Spanish | |
| CBEU | 1340 AM | Temagami | 2014-570 |
| CBEH | 1010 AM | Terrace Bay | 2017-175 |
| CBL | 740 AM | Toronto (high-power; clear channel Class A) | 97-362 |
| CBQ | 800 AM | Thunder Bay (high-power) | 88-866 |
| CBEL | 1510 AM | Vermilion Bay | |
| CBLJ | 1440 AM | Wawa | |
| CBLW | 1010 AM | White River | 2017-74 |
| CBE | 1550 AM | Windsor (high-power) | 2009-349 |
=== Quebec ===
| Call sign | Frequency | City of License | CRTC Decisions |
| CBMH | 1230 AM | Gaspé | |
| CBVE-1 | 830 AM | La Tuque | 2016-227 |
| CBMK | 1230 AM | Lebel-sur-Quévillon | 2017-267 |
| CBMN | 1230 AM | Malartic | 2015-292 |
| CBOM | 710 AM | Maniwaki | 2022-141 |
| CBM | 940 AM | Montreal (high-power; clear channel Class A) | 97-294 |
| CBMJ | 750 AM | Murdochville | 86-21; 2013-226 |
| CBMB | 990 AM | Port-Cartier | |
| CBDN | 570 AM | Schefferville | 94-165 |
| CBMM | 540 AM | Senneterre | 2015-292; 2017-267 |
| CBML | 570 AM | Val-d'Or | 2015-292 |
=== Saskatchewan ===
| Call sign | Frequency | City of License | CRTC Decisions |
| CBDH | 880 AM | Uranium City | |
=== Yukon ===
| Call sign | Frequency | City of License | CRTC Decisions |
| CBDE | 560 AM | Dawson City | 93-725 |
| CBDL | 940 AM | Destruction Bay | 91-200 |
| CBDD | 560 AM | Elsa | 2013-566 |
| CBQK | 1230 AM | Faro | 87-610 |
| CBDF | 860 AM | Haines Junction | 92-180 |
| CBDC | 1230 AM | Mayo | 2013-225 |
| CBDX | 970 AM | Swift River | 2013-566 |

== Première Chaîne / Ici Radio-Canada Première ==
=== Alberta ===
| Call sign | Frequency | City of License | CRTC Decisions |
| CBXY | 1490 AM | Falher | |
=== Manitoba ===
| Call sign | Frequency | City of License | CRTC Decisions |
| CKSB | 1050 AM | Winnipeg | 2013-130 |
| CKSB-10-FM | 90.5 FM | Winnipeg | 2013-130 |
| CKSB-1 | 860 AM | Ste. Rose du Lac | 2003-508 |
=== New Brunswick ===
| Call sign | Frequency | City of License | CRTC Decisions |
| CBGA-1 | 540 AM | Grande-Anse | 2011-677 |
| CBAF-5 | 990 AM | Kedgwick | 2014-9 |
| CBAF-10 | 1320 AM | Minto | |
| CBAF | 1300 AM | Moncton (high-power) | 87-569 |
| CBAF-9 | 1530 AM | Nouvelle-Arcadie | |
| CBAF-21 | 1230 AM | St-Quentin | 2014-9 |
=== Newfoundland and Labrador ===
| Call sign | Frequency | City of License | CRTC Decisions |
| CBSI-3 | 740 AM | Churchill Falls | 88-207 |
| CBSI-4 | 1240 AM | Labrador City/Wabush | 95-441 |
=== Nova Scotia ===
| Call sign | Frequency | City of License | CRTC Decisions |
| CBAF-13 | 610 AM | Arichat | |
| CBHF | 1230 AM | Belle Cote | |
| CBHE | 1380 AM | Cheticamp | |
| CBAF-1 | 990 AM | Digby | |
| CBAF-3 | 580 AM | Meteghan | |
| CBAF-12 | 1340 AM | Pomquet | |
| CBAF-8 | 600 AM | Quinan | |
| CBAF-7 | 990 AM | Wedgeport | |
| CBAF-2 | 1550 AM | Weymouth | 88-205 |
| CBAF-4 | 1230 AM | Yarmouth | |
=== Ontario ===
| Call sign | Frequency | City of License | CRTC Decisions |
| CBON-8 | 990 AM | Bonfield | |
| CBON-9 | 1340 AM | Chapleau | 86-733 |
| CBOF-3 | 730 AM | Deep River | |
| CBON-11 | 540 AM | Dubreuilville | 89-763 |
| CBON-5 | 1440 AM | Elliot Lake | 88-641 |
| CBON-7 | 990 AM | Espanola | 88-643 |
| CBON-15 | 1440 AM | Field | |
| CBON-16 | 900 AM | Geraldton | |
| CBON-3 | 1110 AM | Hearst | 85-1279 |
| CBON-4 | 1370 AM | Kapuskasing | |
| CBON-1 | 1090 AM | Kirkland Lake | 96-780 |
| CBON-10 | 1110 AM | Matachewan | |
| CBOF | 1250 AM | Ottawa (high-power) | 89-835 |
| CBOF-2 | 1240 AM | Petawawa | |
| CBOF-8-FM | 98.7 FM | Renfrew | |
| CBOF-4 | 1400 AM | Rolphton | 2022-324 |
| CBON-2 | 540 AM | Smooth Rock Falls | |
| CBON- | 1400 AM | Sturgeon Falls | |
| CBON-14 | 1360 AM | Verner | |
| CBON-13 | 1090 AM | Wawa | 85-1278 |
=== Quebec ===
| Call sign | Frequency | City of License | CRTC Decisions |
| CBSI-14 | 1350 AM | Aguanish | 2022-24 |
| CBGA-4 | 1450 AM | Causapscal | 96-44 |
| CBF-16 | 990 AM | Clova | 2023-168 |
| CBSI-6 | 710 AM | Fermont | 2013-410 |
| CBFJ | 1380 AM | Gagnon | |
| CBFG | 1400 AM | Gaspe | |
| CBGA-5 | 1420 AM | Grande-Vallée | |
| CBSI-7 | 1100 AM | Havre-Saint-Pierre | 99-119 |
| CBF-5 | 990 AM | Joutel | |
| CBJ-4 | 990 AM | L'Anse-Saint-Jean | 2003-126; 84-436 |
| CBF-17 | 710 AM | Lac-Édouard | 2022-13 |
| CBSI-8 | 1550 AM | La Romaine | 2018-355 |
| CBF-3 | 650 AM | Lebel-sur-Quévillon | 2017-291 |
| CBSI-12 | 1550 AM | Longue-Pointe-de-Mingan | 99-119 |
| CBFB | 990 AM | Megantic | |
| CBSI-11 | 1470 AM | Magpie | 99-119 |
| CBOF-1 | 990 AM | Maniwaki | 2022-141 |
| CBF-4 | 1140 AM | Matagami | 2019-47 |
| CBGA | 1250 AM | Matane | 90-893 |
| CBSI-13 | 740 AM | Mingan | 99-119 |
| CBF-2 | 990 AM | Mont-Brun | 2003-150 |
| CBF | 690 AM | Montreal (high-power; clear channel Class A) | 97-293 |
| CBGA-6 | 1270 AM | Murdochville | 2013-183 |
| CBSI-5 | 1100 AM | Natashquan | 2018-53 |
| CBF-18 | 710 AM | Parent | 2017-199 |
| CBJ-5 | 1140 AM | Petit-Saguenay | 2003-126; 84-435 |
| *CBSI-23 | 1130 AM | Port-Menier | 2025-141 |
| CBV | 980 AM | Quebec City (high-power) | 97-295 |
| CJBR | 900 AM | Rimouski | 99-426 |
| CBGA-3 | 1530 AM | Rivière-au-Renard | 90-893 |
| CBSI-10 | 1530 AM | Rivière-au-Tonnerre | 99-119 |
| CBSI-22 | 1380 AM | Rivière-Saint-Jean | 99-119 |
| CBJ | 1580 AM | Saguenay (high-power) | 98-215 |
| CBGA-7 | 1340 AM | Sainte-Anne-des-Monts | 2005-98 |
| CBV-4 | 1340 AM | Sanmaur | |
| CBSI-2 | 760 AM | Schefferville | 94-166 |
| CBF-1 | 710 AM | Senneterre | 2017-291 |
| CBSI-9 | 1100 AM | Sheldrake | 99-119 |
| CBFA-3 | 750 AM | Weymontachie | 2013-198 |

Note due to a vast number of CBC radio transmitters and rebroadcasters across Canada, there are a possibly a number of defunct transmitters that have yet to be listed here.

== See also ==
- List of CBC radio AM transmitters in Canada
