= CBC Radio One local programming =

Stations in Canada's CBC Radio One network each produce some local programming in addition to the network schedule.

The amount of local programming may vary from station to station. For instance, some stations in smaller markets may produce their own morning show but air an afternoon show from another station. Some stations in major markets also preempt some regular network programming in favour of an extended local schedule.

Some regional programming is also produced which is shared by all stations in a province. This most commonly applies to daily noon-hour shows, weekend morning shows and a Saturday afternoon arts and culture magazine.

== Content ==
Local programs on CBC Radio One feature news and human interest content local to the region they serve. Each program also includes both national and local news headline segments. Some general content segments, such as business news reports, science news reports and entertainment reviews, air across the network on all local programs.

Some local segments from the various morning and afternoon programs are also aired on the national network program The Story from Here.

At the top of each hour during the morning and afternoon programs, national newscasts – World Report in the mornings and The World This Hour in the afternoons – air for the first ten minutes. A shorter local newscast typically airs at the half-hour mark.

On statutory holidays, nearly all local programming is preempted in favour of network-wide special programming. In heavily populated provinces like Ontario, the various local morning shows within often rotate broadcasting for the entire province. On Christmas Day, the entire daytime broadcasting schedule, and most of the evening is preempted for holiday music programming except for news programming such as World Report and Your World Tonight.

== Weekday programming ==
Local morning shows air from 5:30 or 6 local time, depending on the station, to 8:30. They are followed by a local news update, and then The Current at 8:37. The sole exception is Qulliq, the program from Nunavut, which begins at 6:30 ET and airs until 9:30 ET. As of the 2015-16 television season, the 6:00 hour of these programs outside of CBC North air on local CBC television stations.

Local afternoon shows on CBC Radio One air from 4 to 6 local time, except in Halifax, Ottawa, Toronto, Winnipeg, Calgary, Edmonton, Vancouver and Victoria, where they start at 3. Rebroadcasters outside of those cities do not air the first hour of the extended afternoon shows; they stay with regional or conventional network programming and then rejoin their host station's afternoon show at 4.

In addition to the standard local programming blocks, the stations in Nunavut, the Northwest Territories, and northern Quebec also preempt much of the network's afternoon schedule to produce additional local programming in aboriginal languages. See CBC North for further information. (Pre-6 morning show start times are listed in brackets in the table)

City	Station	Morning show 5:30 or 6:00 to 8:30	Noon show 12:00 to 1:00	Afternoon show 3:00 or 4:00 to 6:00
=== Alberta ===
Calgary	CBR	Calgary Eyeopener (Loren McGinnis and Angela Knight)	Alberta @ Noon (Andrew Brown)	The Homestretch (Chris dela Torre)
Edmonton	CBX	Edmonton A.M. (Tara McCarthy and Colton Hutchinson) (5:30)	Alberta @ Noon (Andrew Brown)	Radio Active (Jennifer Ng and Min Dhariwal)
=== British Columbia ===
Kamloops	CBYK-FM	Daybreak Kamloops (Shelley Joyce)	BC Today (Michelle Eliot)	Radio West (Sarah Penton)
Kelowna	CBTK-FM	Daybreak South (Chris Walker)	BC Today (Michelle Eliot)	Radio West (Sarah Penton)
Prince George	CBYG-FM	Daybreak North (Carolina de Ryk)	BC Today (Michelle Eliot)	Radio West (Sarah Penton)
Prince Rupert	CFPR	Daybreak North (Carolina de Ryk)	BC Today (Michelle Eliot)	Radio West (Sarah Penton)
Vancouver	CBU	The Early Edition (Stephen Quinn) (5:00)	BC Today (Michelle Eliot)	On the Coast (Gloria Macarenko)
Victoria	CBCV-FM	On the Island (Gregor Craigie) (5:30)	BC Today (Michelle Eliot)	All Points West (Jason D'Souza)
=== Manitoba ===
Thompson	CBWK-FM	Information Radio (Marcy Markusa)	Radio Noon (Marjorie Dowhos)	Up to Speed (Faith Fundal)
Winnipeg	CBW	Information Radio (Marcy Markusa)	Radio Noon (Marjorie Dowhos)	Up to Speed (Faith Fundal)
=== New Brunswick ===
Fredericton	CBZF-FM	Information Morning (Jeanne Armstrong)	Maritime Noon (Bob Murphy)	Shift 4:00 to 6:00 (Vanessa Vander Valk)
Moncton	CBAM-FM	Information Morning (Vanessa Blanch)	Maritime Noon (Bob Murphy)	Shift 4:00 to 6:00 (Vanessa Vander Valk)
Saint John	CBD-FM	Information Morning (Emily Brass)	Maritime Noon (Bob Murphy)	Shift 4:00 to 6:00 (Vanessa Vander Valk)
=== Newfoundland and Labrador ===
Corner Brook	CBY	CBC Newfoundland Morning (Martin Jones and Bernice Hillier) (6:00)	The Signal (Adam Walsh)	On the Go (Krissy Holmes) (4:00), The Broadcast (Paula Gale) (6:00)
Gander; Grand Falls-Windsor	CBG; CBT-FM	CBC Newfoundland Morning (Martin Jones and Bernice Hillier) (6:00)	The Signal (Adam Walsh)	On the Go (Krissy Holmes) (4:00), The Broadcast (Paula Gale) (6:00)
Happy Valley-Goose Bay	CFGB-FM	Labrador Morning (Rhivu Rashid) (5:30)	The Signal (Adam Walsh)	On the Go (Krissy Holmes) (4:00), The Broadcast (Paula Gale) (6:00)
St. John's	CBN	The St. John's Morning Show (Jen White) (5:30 am)	The Signal (Adam Walsh)	On the Go (Krissy Holmes) (4:00), The Broadcast (Paula Gale) (6:00)
=== Northwest Territories ===
Inuvik	CHAK	Qulliq (Teresa Qiatsuq) (4:30), The Trailbreaker (Hilary Bird)	Northwind (Wanda McLeod)	Nantaii (William Firth) (1 pm), Legots'edeh (Mary Anne Williams) (2:00), Tusaavik (Dodie Malegana), Trail's End
Yellowknife	CFYK-FM	Qulliq (Teresa Qiatsuq) (4:30), The Trailbreaker (Hilary Bird)	Northwind (Wanda McLeod)	Tide Godi (Cecilia Boyd) (1 pm), Dehcho Dene (Jimmy Hope) (2 pm), Denesuline Yatia (Marline Grooms), Trail's End
=== Nova Scotia ===
Halifax	CBHA-FM	Information Morning (Portia Clark)	Maritime Noon (Bob Murphy)	Mainstreet (Jeff Douglas) 3:00 (or 4:00 outside HRM) to 6:00
Sydney	CBI	Information Morning (Steve Sutherland)	Maritime Noon (Bob Murphy)	Mainstreet (Wendy Bergfeldt) 4:00 to 6:00
=== Nunavut ===
Iqaluit	CFFB	Qulliq (Teresa Qiatsuq) (6:30)	Nipivut (Pauline Pemik)	Tausunni (1 pm), Tuttavik, Tusaajaksat, Tusaavik, Sinnaksautit (10 pm)
Rankin Inlet	CBQR-FM	Qulliq (Teresa Qiatsuq) (5:30)	Nipivut (Pauline Pemik) (11 am)	Tausunni (noon), Tuttavik (2:00), Tusaajaksat, Tusaavik, Sinnaksautit (9 pm)
=== Ontario ===
London	CBCL-FM	London Morning	Ontario Today (Amanda Pfeffer)	Afternoon Drive (Matt Allen)
Ottawa	CBO-FM	Ottawa Morning (Rebecca Zandbergen)	Ontario Today (Amanda Pfeffer)	All in a Day (Alan Neal)
Eastern Ontario	CBO-FM	Ontario Morning (Ramraajh Sharvendiran)	Ontario Today (Amanda Pfeffer)	All in a Day (Alan Neal)
Sudbury	CBCS-FM	Morning North (Markus Schwabe)	Ontario Today (Amanda Pfeffer)	Up North (Jonathan Pinto)
Thunder Bay	CBQT-FM	Superior Morning (Mary-Jean Cormier)	Ontario Today (Amanda Pfeffer)	Up North (Jonathan Pinto)
Toronto	CBLA-FM	Metro Morning (Chris Glover)	Ontario Today (Amanda Pfeffer)	Here and Now (Farrah Merali)
Southern Ontario	CBLA-FM	Ontario Morning (Ramraajh Sharvendiran)	Ontario Today (Amanda Pfeffer)	Here and Now (Farrah Merali)
Kitchener-Waterloo	CBLA-FM-2	The Morning Edition (Craig Norris)	Ontario Today (Amanda Pfeffer)	Here and Now (Farrah Merali)
Windsor	CBEW-FM	Windsor Morning (Amy Dodge)	Ontario Today (Amanda Pfeffer)	Afternoon Drive (Matt Allen)
=== Prince Edward Island ===
Charlottetown	CBCT-FM	Island Morning (Mitch Cormier)	Maritime Noon (Bob Murphy)	Mainstreet 4:00 to 6:00 (Steve Bruce)
=== Quebec ===
Chisasibi (Eeyou Istchee)	CBMP-FM	Quebec AM (Julia Caron), Winschgaoug	Eyou Dipajimoon (Marjorie Kitty)	Winschgaoug (Elma Moses), Breakaway (Alison Brunette)
Kuujjuaq (Nunavik)	CFFB-FM-5	Quebec AM, Qulliq (Teresa Qiatsuq)	Nipivut	Tausunni (1 pm) (Isabela Katokra), Tuttavik (2 pm) (Alec Gordon), Tusaavik (Dodie Malegana), Tusaajaksat (Robert Kabvitok and Lissie Aniviapik), Tusaavik (Dodie Malegana), Sinnaksautit (10 pm)
Montreal	CBME-FM	Daybreak Montreal (Sean Henry) (5:30 am)	Radio Noon (Shawn Apel)	Let's Go (Sabrina Marandola)
Quebec City	CBVE-FM	Quebec AM (Julia Caron)	Radio Noon (Shawn Apel)	Breakaway (Alison Brunette)
=== Saskatchewan ===
Regina	CBK	The Morning Edition (Stefani Langenegger)	Blue Sky (Leisha Grebinski)	The 306 (Peter Mills)
Saskatoon	CBK-1-FM	Saskatoon Morning (Stephanie Massicotte)	Blue Sky (Leisha Grebinski)	The 306 (Peter Mills)
=== Yukon ===
Whitehorse	CFWH-FM	Yukon Morning (Elyn Jones)	Midday Café (Leonard Linklater)	Airplay (Dave White)

== Weekend programming ==
Each province and territory also has a regional weekend morning show, which airs provincewide Saturday and Sunday mornings from 6 to 9, and most also have a regional arts and culture magazine which airs on Saturday afternoons scheduled around the live nationwide call-in show, Just Asking, depending on the local time zone. Stations in the Atlantic provinces air an additional regional arts and culture program on Sunday afternoons at 4:00 AT, due in part to a hole in the schedule created by the fact that Cross Country Checkup airs live across Canada at 5:00 AT. CBI in Sydney airs the long running Island Echoes, a weekly cultural program on Saturday evenings at 8:00 AT.

In parts of Western Canada, however, distinct Saturday afternoon arts and culture magazines are no longer aired; the stations air a repeat broadcast of the national network program Unreserved.

As of October 2025, the regional arts and culture magazine shows from Toronto, Atlantic Canada, Alberta and British Columbia are also rebroadcast nationally on CBC Music on Sunday nights.

City	Station	Saturday morning 6:00 to 9:00	Saturday afternoon 5:00 to 6:00	Saturday evening 8:00 to 9:00	Sunday morning 6:00 to 9:00	Sunday afternoon 4:00 to 5:00
=== Alberta ===
Calgary	CBR	Daybreak Alberta (Paul Karchut)	Key of A (Tarik Robinson)	n/a	Daybreak Alberta (Paul Karchut)	n/a
Edmonton	CBX	Daybreak Alberta (Paul Karchut)	Key of A (Tarik Robinson)	n/a	Daybreak Alberta (Paul Karchut)	n/a
=== British Columbia ===
Kamloops	CBYK-FM	North by Northwest (Margaret Gallagher)	Vibin' (Rohit Joseph)	n/a	North by Northwest (Margaret Gallagher)	n/a
Kelowna	CBTK-FM	North by Northwest (Margaret Gallagher)	Vibin' (Rohit Joseph)	n/a	North by Northwest (Margaret Gallagher)	n/a
Prince George	CBYG-FM	North by Northwest (Margaret Gallagher)	Vibin' (Rohit Joseph)	n/a	North by Northwest (Margaret Gallagher)	n/a
Prince Rupert	CFPR	North by Northwest (Margaret Gallagher)	Vibin' (Rohit Joseph)	n/a	North by Northwest (Margaret Gallagher)	n/a
Vancouver	CBU	North by Northwest (Margaret Gallagher)	Vibin' (Rohit Joseph)	n/a	North by Northwest (Margaret Gallagher)	n/a
Victoria	CBCV-FM	North by Northwest (Margaret Gallagher)	Vibin' (Rohit Joseph)	n/a	North by Northwest (Margaret Gallagher)	n/a
=== Manitoba ===
Thompson	CBWK-FM	The Weekend Morning Show (Nadia Kidwai)	Unreserved (Rosanna Deerchild)	n/a	The Weekend Morning Show (Nadia Kidwai)	n/a
Winnipeg	CBW	The Weekend Morning Show (Nadia Kidwai)	Unreserved (Rosanna Deerchild)	n/a	The Weekend Morning Show (Nadia Kidwai)	n/a
=== New Brunswick ===
Fredericton	CBZF-FM	Weekend Mornings (Bill Roach)	East Coast Music Hour (Bill Roach)	n/a	Weekend Mornings (6:00–8:30), Atlantic Voice (Lindsay Bird) (8:30–9:00)	Maritime Connection (Preston Mulligan)
Moncton	CBAM-FM	Weekend Mornings (Bill Roach)	East Coast Music Hour (Bill Roach)	n/a	Weekend Mornings (6:00–8:30), Atlantic Voice (Lindsay Bird) (8:30–9:00)	Maritime Connection (Preston Mulligan)
Saint John	CBD-FM	Weekend Mornings (Bill Roach)	East Coast Music Hour (Bill Roach)	n/a	Weekend Mornings (6:00–8:30), Atlantic Voice (Lindsay Bird) (8:30–9:00)	Maritime Connection (Preston Mulligan)
=== Newfoundland and Labrador ===
Corner Brook	CBY	Weekend AM (Heather Barrett)	East Coast Music Hour (Bill Roach)	n/a	Weekend AM (Heather Barrett)	Deep Roots (Tom Power)
Gander	CBG	Weekend AM (Heather Barrett)	East Coast Music Hour (Bill Roach)	n/a	Weekend AM (Heather Barrett)	Deep Roots (Tom Power)
Happy Valley-Goose Bay	CFGB-FM	Weekend AM (Heather Barrett)	East Coast Music Hour (Bill Roach)	n/a	Weekend AM (Heather Barrett)	Deep Roots (Tom Power)
St. John's	CBN	Weekend AM (Heather Barrett)	East Coast Music Hour (Bill Roach)	n/a	Weekend AM (Heather Barrett)	Deep Roots (Tom Power)
=== Northwest Territories ===
Inuvik	CHAK	The Weekender (Jared Monkman)	Unreserved (Rosanna Deerchild) (4:00-5:00), Dene Yati	n/a	The Weekender (Jared Monkman)	Voice of the Gwich'in (William Firth) (5:00)
Yellowknife	CFYK-FM	The Weekender (Jared Monkman)	Unreserved (Rosanna Deerchild) (4:00-5:00), Dene Yati	n/a	The Weekender (Jared Monkman)	Voice of the Gwich'in (William Firth) (5:00)
=== Nova Scotia ===
Halifax	CBHA-FM	Weekend Mornings (Bill Roach)	East Coast Music Hour (Bill Roach)	n/a	Weekend Mornings (6:00–8:30), Atlantic Voice (Lindsay Bird) (8:30–9:00)	Maritime Connection (Preston Mulligan)
Sydney	CBI	Weekend Mornings (Bill Roach)	East Coast Music Hour (Bill Roach)	Island Echoes (Wendy Bergfeldt)	Weekend Mornings (6:00–8:30), Atlantic Voice (Lindsay Bird) (8:30–9:00)	Maritime Connection (Preston Mulligan)
=== Nunavut ===
Iqaluit	CFFB	Saturday Morning Show (Toby Otak)	Unreserved (Rosanna Deerchild) (4:00)	n/a	Sunday Morning Show (Toby Otak)	Sunday Request Show (3:00)
Rankin Inlet	CBQR-FM	Saturday Morning Show (Toby Otak) (5:00)	Unreserved (Rosanna Deerchild) (3:00)	n/a	Sunday Morning Show (Toby Otak) (5:00)	Sunday Request Show (2:00)
=== Ontario ===
Ottawa	CBO-FM	In Town and Out (Giacomo Panico)	In the Key of C (Craig Norris)	n/a	Fresh Air (Ismaila Alfa)	n/a
Eastern Ontario	CBO-FM	Fresh Air (Ismaila Alfa)	In the Key of C (Craig Norris)	n/a	Fresh Air (Ismaila Alfa)	n/a
Sudbury	CBCS-FM	Fresh Air (Ismaila Alfa)	In the Key of C (Craig Norris)	n/a	Fresh Air (Ismaila Alfa)	n/a
Thunder Bay	CBQT-FM	Fresh Air (Ismaila Alfa)	In the Key of C (Craig Norris)	n/a	Fresh Air (Ismaila Alfa)	n/a
Toronto	CBLA-FM	Fresh Air (Ismaila Alfa)	Big City, Small World (Errol Nazareth)	n/a	Fresh Air (Ismaila Alfa)	n/a
Southern Ontario	CBLA-FM	Fresh Air (Ismaila Alfa)	In the Key of C (Craig Norris)	n/a	Fresh Air (Ismaila Alfa)	n/a
Windsor	CBEW-FM	Fresh Air (Ismaila Alfa)	In the Key of C (Craig Norris)	n/a	Fresh Air (Ismaila Alfa)	n/a
=== Prince Edward Island ===
Charlottetown	CBCT-FM	Weekend Mornings (Bill Roach)	East Coast Music Hour (Bill Roach)	n/a	Weekend Mornings (6:00–8:30), Atlantic Voice (Lindsay Bird) (8:30–9:00)	Maritime Connection (Preston Mulligan)
=== Quebec ===
Chisasibi (Eeyou Istchee)	CBMP-FM	All in a Weekend (Sonali Karnick)	The Bridge (Nantali Indongo)	n/a	All in a Weekend (Sonali Karnick)	n/a
Kuujjuaq (Nunavik)	CFFB-FM-5	Saturday Morning Show (Toby Otak)	Unreserved (Rosanna Deerchild) (4:00)	n/a	Sunday Morning Show (Toby Otak)	n/a
Montreal	CBME-FM	All in a Weekend (Sonali Karnick)	The Bridge (Nantali Indongo)	n/a	All in a Weekend (Sonali Karnick)	n/a
Quebec City	CBVE-FM	All in a Weekend (Sonali Karnick)	The Bridge (Nantali Indongo)	n/a	All in a Weekend (Sonali Karnick)	n/a
=== Saskatchewan ===
Regina	CBK	Saskatchewan Weekend (Shauna Powers)	Unreserved (Rosanna Deerchild)	n/a	Saskatchewan Weekend (Shauna Powers)	n/a
=== Yukon ===
Whitehorse	CFWH-FM	The Weekender (Marc Winkler)	Unreserved (Rosanna Deerchild) (4:00), Rencontres	n/a	The Weekender (Marc Winkler)	Voice of the Gwich'in (William Firth) (5 pm)
