= CBQI =

CBQI may refer to:

- CBQI (AM), a radio rebroadcaster (920 AM) licensed to Fort Norman, Northwest Territories, Canada, rebroadcasting CHAK
- CBQI-FM, a radio rebroadcaster (90.1 FM) licensed to Atikokan, Ontario, Canada, rebroadcasting CBQT-FM
