= CFYK =

CFYK may refer to:

- CFYK (AM), a radio station (1340 AM) licensed to Yellowknife, Northwest Territories, Canada
- CFYK-FM, a radio station (98.9 FM) licensed to Yellowknife, Northwest Territories, Canada
- CFYK-DT, a television station (channel 8) licensed to Yellowknife, Northwest Territories, Canada
