= CBYW =

CBYW may refer to:

- CBYW (AM), a radio rebroadcaster (540 AM) licensed to Wells, British Columbia, Canada, rebroadcasting CBYG-FM
- CBYW-FM, a radio rebroadcaster (100.1 FM) licensed to Whistler, British Columbia, Canada, rebroadcasting CBU
