= CBKR =

CBKR may refer to:

- CBKR (AM), a radio rebroadcaster (740 AM) licensed to Parson, British Columbia, Canada, rebroadcasting CBTK-FM
- CBKR-FM, a radio rebroadcaster (102.5 FM) licensed to Regina, Saskatchewan, Canada, rebroadcasting CBK
