= CBAX =

CBAX may refer to:

- CBAX (AM), a radio rebroadcaster (600 AM) licensed to McAdam, New Brunswick, Canada, rebroadcasting CBZF-FM
- CBAX-FM, a radio station (91.5 FM) licensed to Halifax, Nova Scotia, Canada
