= CBDI =

CBDI may refer to:

- CBDI (AM), a radio rebroadcaster (860 AM) licensed to Fort Smith, Northwest Territories, Canada, rebroadcasting CFYK
- CBDI-FM, a radio rebroadcaster (103.5 FM) licensed to Poplar River, Manitoba, Canada, rebroadcasting CBWK-FM
- CBDI-TV, a low-power television retransmitter (channel 13) licensed to Poplar River, Manitoba, Canada, retransmitting CBMT
