= CBDC =

CBDC may refer to:

- Central bank digital currency
- CBDC-FM, a radio station licensed to Mayo, Yukon, Canada
- Cardiff Bay Development Corporation
