= CBDN =

CBDN may refer to:

- CBDN (AM), a radio rebroadcaster (560 AM) licensed to Dawson, Yukon Territory, Canada, rebroadcasting CFWH
- CBDN-FM, a radio rebroadcaster (104.9 FM) licensed to Dawson, Yukon Territory, Canada, rebroadcasting CBU-FM
