= CFTL-FM =

First Nations radio station in Ontario, Canada

- Big Trout Lake, Ontario; Canada
- Broadcast area: Kitchenuhmaykoosib Inninuwug First Nation
- Frequency: 100.3 MHz (FM)

Ownership
- Owner: Ayamowin Communications Society

History
- First air date: 1974

Technical information
- Licensing authority: CRTC
- ERP: 63 watts
- Transmitter coordinates: 53.833°N 89.883°W

CFTL-FM, is a First Nations community radio station which operates at 100.3 MHz FM in Big Trout Lake, Ontario, Canada. The station is owned by the Ayamowin Communications Society and is a rebroadcaster of CBC Radio One outlet CBQT-FM in Thunder Bay.

CFTL-FM was originally established in 1974 and was the first community radio station in Ontario, established locally with the support of the Wawatay Native Communications Society; its popularity led communities, first at Muskrat Dam then elsewhere, to ask for similar assistance. By its 1992 CRTC licence renewal, it was authorized to broadcast 59 hours of local programming in Oji-Cree, 10 hours of Wawatay programs, and 99 hours of output from the CBC Stereo FM network. In later years, it switched from CBC Stereo to CBC Radio One through CBQT-FM in Thunder Bay.
