= CBLN =

CBLN may refer to:

- CBLN-FM, a radio rebroadcaster (98.1 FM) licensed to Nakina, Ontario, Canada, rebroadcasting CBQT-FM
- CBLN-TV, a defunct television retransmitter (channel 23) licensed to London, Ontario, Canada, retransmitting CBLT from 1988 to 2012
