= CBCV-FM =

CBC Radio One station in Victoria, British Columbia

- Victoria, British Columbia; Canada
- Broadcast area: Vancouver Island
- Frequency: 90.5 MHz

Programming
- Format: News/Talk
- Network: CBC Radio One

Ownership
- Owner: Canadian Broadcasting Corporation

History
- First air date: September 28, 1998
- Call sign meaning: Canadian Broadcasting Corporation Victoria

Technical information
- Licensing authority: CRTC
- Class: C1
- ERP: 3,000 watts (average); 6,300 watts (peak horiz.)
- HAAT: 494 metres (1,621 ft)
- Transmitter coordinates: 48°35′40″N 123°32′42″W

Links
- Webcast: Listen live
- Website: cbc.ca/bc

CBCV-FM (90.5 FM) is a Canadian radio station, which broadcasts the programming of the CBC Radio One network in Victoria, British Columbia, and throughout Vancouver Island, the Southern Gulf Islands, and the Sunshine Coast. It also reaches out to parts of Washington north of Everett, but is harder to listen to because of KSER on 90.7.

It was the most listened to radio station in the Victoria Market in the Fall 2018 Numeris Diary Survey.

== History ==
The station was licensed by the CRTC in 1997, and was launched on September 28, 1998. At the same time, the station was licensed to add a rebroadcaster at Metchosin, and took over 13 existing rebroadcasters of Vancouver's CBU.

Prior to the station's launch, Victoria was the only provincial capital in Canada without its own CBC Radio production centre.

As of January 25, 2013, the station shares its studio facilities with independent television station CHEK-DT.

== Local programming ==
The station's local programs are On the Island (hosted by Gregor Craigie) in the morning and All Points West (hosted by Jason D'Souza, previously hosted by Robyn Burns) in the afternoon. Both programs broadcast exclusively on CBCV and its rebroadcasters on Vancouver Island and the Sunshine Coast.

== Transmitters ==
Rebroadcasters of CBCV-FM
City of licence	Identifier	Frequency	Power	Class	RECNet	Notes
Alert Bay	CBRY-FM	105.1 FM	360 watts	A	Query	50°34′47″N 126°55′05″W
Campbell River	CBYT-FM	104.5 FM	88 watts	A1	Query	50°3′14″N 125°19′35″W
Coal Harbour	CBKO	540 AM	40 watts	LP	Query	50°36′4″N 127°34′23″W
Gold River	CBKJ	860 AM	40 watts	LP	Query	49°46′24″N 126°3′13″W
Metchosin-Sooke	CBCV-FM-1	99.5 FM	64 watts	A	Query	48°24′8″N 123°34′25″W
Port Alberni	CBTQ-FM	98.1 FM	348 watts	A	Query	49°14′28″N 124°47′8″W
Port Alice	CBCV-FM-2	92.3 FM	50 watts	LP	Query	50°25′39″N 127°28′42″W
Port Hardy	CBUY-FM	95.5 FM	182 watts	A1	Query	50°42′36″N 127°26′30″W
Powell River	CBUW-FM	92.5 FM	3,720 watts	B	Query	49°41′54″N 124°26′5″W; Also serves the Oceanside and Comox Valley areas
Sayward	CBKU	630 AM	40 watts	LP	Query	50°23′17″N 125°57′43″W
Tahsis	CBTT-FM	90.5 FM	46 watts	LP	Query	49°55′36″N 126°39′6″W; Moved from 1240 AM
Tofino	CBXZ-FM	91.5 FM	510 watts	A	Query	49°8′56″N 125°54′0″W
Ucluelet	CBXZ-FM-1	92.7 FM	50 watts	LP	Query	48°56′17″N 125°32′48″W; Moved from 540 AM
Woss Camp	CBTW-FM	92.7 FM	300 watts	B	Query	50°10′9″N 126°34′13″W

The only major city on Vancouver Island without its own CBC Radio transmitter is Nanaimo. CBCV's signal on 90.5 MHz from Victoria only reaches as far north as Ladysmith, and its signal on 92.5 MHz from Powell River as received in the Nanaimo area interferes with KQMV from Seattle. Consequently, the only CBC Radio One signals that can be reliably received in the Nanaimo area are from CBU Vancouver, which air weekday morning and afternoon local programs from Vancouver instead of Victoria. The CBC applied to the CRTC to add a rebroadcaster of CBCV at Nanaimo in 2007, contemporaneous with an application to convert the Vancouver station to FM. As few FM frequencies remain available in the Vancouver-Victoria market, however, the applications were denied. CBU was permitted to add a nested low-power rebroadcaster in the urban core of Vancouver, but was required to maintain the AM signal to serve outlying areas, including Nanaimo. HD Radio receivers in Nanaimo can however receive Victoria's local programming over the HD3 channel of Vancouver's 88.1 MHz signal.

On October 20, 2015 the CRTC approved the CBC's application to operate a low-power FM rebroadcasting transmitter in Ucluelet, which will operate at 92.7 MHz with an effective radiated power of 50 watts. The new FM transmitter replaced the old AM transmitter, CBXQ.

On March 9, 2016, the CBC received CRTC approval to change the technical parameters of CBRY by changing the transmitter's class from A1 to A, by increasing the effective radiated power from 77 to 360 watts and by increasing the effective height of antenna above average terrain from -50.5 to -41.5 metres.

On December 22, 2016, the CBC applied to convert CBUX 1170 to 92.3 MHz with the proposed callsign CBCV-FM-2. The CRTC approved the CBC's application on March 17, 2017.
