= Daybreak Montreal =

Radio program

Daybreak Montreal is a daily, early morning, English-language Canadian radio program, broadcast by CBME-FM, the CBC Radio One station in Montreal, Quebec.

In 2006, Dave Bronstetter stepped down after hosting the program for 11 years; he was replaced by Mike Finnerty.

Finnerty, who was 41 in 2007, was born in Esterhazy, Saskatchewan. He first joined CBC Radio in Quebec City as a young reporter in 1989, moving to CBC Radio Montreal in 1992. Finnerty worked in London for the BBC World Service for ten years, before becoming host of Daybreak.

Nancy Wood was hired as host in 2009. Her dismissal in 2010 was the subject of some controversy in Montreal.

== See also ==
- CBC Radio One local programming
