= CFPR =

Radio station in Prince Rupert, British Columbia

- Prince Rupert, British Columbia; Canada
- Broadcast area: North Coast
- Frequency: 860 kHz

Programming
- Format: News/Talk
- Network: CBC Radio One

Ownership
- Owner: Canadian Broadcasting Corporation

History
- First air date: 1936
- Former frequencies: 580 kHz (1936–1941); 1240 kHz (1941–1967)
- Call sign meaning: Canada's Finest Prince Rupert

Technical information
- Licensing authority: CRTC
- Class: B
- Power: 10,000 watts (day); 2,500 watts (night)
- Transmitter coordinates: 54°17′7″N 130°22′34″W

Links
- Website: http://cbc.ca/bc

CFPR is a Canadian radio station, airing at 860 AM in Prince Rupert, British Columbia. It is part of the CBC Radio One network.

== History ==
CFPR first aired in 1936 on 580 AM, as a private CBC Radio affiliate owned by Northwest Broadcast & Service Co. It moved to 1240 AM in 1941 (see Canadian allocations changes under NARBA), and became a Trans-Canada Network affiliate in 1944. The station was directly acquired by the CBC in 1953 shortly after going out of business as a private station.

In 1963, the CBC was granted approval to move the station to its current frequency, which it did by 1967.

In 1988, the CBC applied to convert the station to a straight rebroadcaster of CBYG-FM in Prince George. The application was denied by the Canadian Radio-television and Telecommunications Commission (CRTC). However, CFPR airs the same programming as CBYG-FM at all times, as they share production of their local programming.

== Local programming ==
CFPR and CBYG-FM Prince George jointly produce the local morning program Daybreak North. Carolina de Ryk conducts interviews and introduces segments from the studio in Prince Rupert while Bill Fee presents news, roads and weather from the studio in Prince George. Both stations air CBTK-FM's Radio West in the afternoons.

== Rebroadcasters ==
Rebroadcasters of CFPR
| City of licence | Identifier | Frequency | Power | Class | RECNet | CRTC Decision | Notes |
|---|---|---|---|---|---|---|---|
| Aiyansh | CBYA-FM | 102.3 FM | 278 watts | A | Query | | 55°12′29″N 129°3′13″W |
| Daajing Giids | CBYQ-FM | 104.9 FM | 4750 watts | B | Query | | 53°14′11″N 131°55′3″W |
| Kispiox | CBTD-FM | 91.3 FM | 252 watts | A | Query | 2012-159 | 55°20′42″N 127°41′24″W |
| Kitimat | CBUK-FM | 101.1 FM | 102 watts | A1 | Query | | 54°3′12″N 128°38′8″W |
| Kitwanga | CBTZ-FM | 94.3 FM | 186 watts | A1 | Query | 96-153 | 55°6′17″N 127°58′33″W |
| Masset | CBTM-FM | 103.9 FM | 85 watts | A1 | Query | | 54°0′11″N 132°7′11″W |
| New Hazelton | CBRH | 1170 AM | 40 watts | LP | Query | | 55°15′2″N 127°34′38″W |
| Port Clements | CBYB-FM | 102.9 FM | 90 watts | A1 | Query | | 53°41′1″N 132°11′8″W |
| Stewart | CBKA | *1450 AM 98.1 FM | 40 202 watts | LP A1 | Query | | 55°56′34″N 129°59′36″W |
| Terrace | CBTH-FM | 95.3 FM | 225 watts | B | Query | | 54°31′4″N 128°28′21″W |

On November 29, 2011, the CBC applied to the CRTC to convert CBTD 990 to 91.3 MHz. This application was approved on March 19, 2012.

The CBC also previously operated CBKL 1150, a low-power rebroadcaster in Alice Arm; this rebroadcaster would be closed at the CBC's request by the CRTC on October 25, 2013.

On August 30, 2024, the CBC applied to the CRTC to convert CBKA 1450 to 98.1 MHz with a new callsign, CBUI-FM. The CBC received approval to move CBKA Stewart from the AM band to the FM band on November 7, 2024. The new callsign will become CBUI-FM.
