= CBGA-FM =

Ici Radio-Canada Première station in Quebec

- Matane, Quebec; Canada
- Broadcast area: Gaspésie–Îles-de-la-Madeleine
- Frequency: 102.1 MHz

Programming
- Format: News/Talk
- Network: Ici Radio-Canada Première

Ownership
- Owner: Canadian Broadcasting Corporation

History
- First air date: September 1, 1948
- Former call signs: CKBL (1948–1972)
- Former frequencies: 1250 kHz (1948–2004)
- Call sign meaning: Canadian Broadcasting Corporation Gaspésie–Îles-de-la-Madeleine

Technical information
- Class: C1
- ERP: 42.93 kW horizontal polarization only
- HAAT: 199.8 metres (656 ft)
- Transmitter coordinates: 48°49′51.96″N 67°22′5.16″W

Links
- Website: Ici Radio-Canada Première

CBGA-FM is a French-language Canadian radio station located in Matane, Quebec.

Owned and operated by Société Radio-Canada, it broadcasts on 102.1 MHz with an effective radiated power of 42,930 watts (class C1) using an omnidirectional antenna.

The station has a non-commercial news/talk format and is part of the Ici Radio-Canada Première network, which operates across Canada. Like all other Première stations, but unlike most FM stations, CBGA-FM broadcasts in mono.

Previously known as CBGA when the station was on 1250 kHz, the station moved to 102.1 FM in 2004. The station was founded in 1948 as CKBL and changed its call sign when it was bought by Radio-Canada in 1972.

The station's current local programs are Bon pied, bonne heure !, in the mornings from 6 a.m. to 9 a.m., and Au coeur du monde in the afternoons, 3:30 p.m. to 6 p.m. CBGA-FM also co-produces D'Est en est, a pan-regional program produced in turn with CJBR-FM Rimouski and CBSI-FM Sept-Îles and heard afternoons during the summer months. On public holidays, its local programs are replaced with local shows airing provincewide (Quebec) produced by different outlets in turn (except Montreal and Quebec City). Its Saturday morning program, Samedi et rien d'autre, originates from CBF-FM Montreal.

== Rebroadcasters ==
Rebroadcasters of CBGA-FM
City of licence	Identifier	Frequency	Power	Class	RECNet	CRTC Decision	Notes
Gaspé (L'Anse-à-Valleau)	CBGA-15-FM	101.5 FM	83 watts	A1	Query		49°4′27.12″N 64°32′12.12″W
Les Îles-de-la-Madeleine	CBGA-8-FM	93.5 FM	4,400 watts	B	Query	94-914	47°23′3.84″N 61°55′0.84″W
Cloridorme	CBGA-9-FM	105.1 FM	204 watts	A1	Query		49°11′26.88″N 64°53′26.88″W
Gaspé	CBGA-10-FM	89.3 FM	2,160 watts	B	Query		48°50′0.96″N 64°15′24.12″W
Grande-Vallée	CBGA-14-FM	104.1 FM	1,450 watts	A	Query	2015-197	49°13′3″N 65°10′42.96″W
Saint-Maxime-du-Mont-Louis (Gros-Morne)	CBGA-13-FM	94.5 FM	40 watts	LP	Query		49°15′2.88″N 65°32′3.84″W
Lac-au-Saumon	CBGA-4-FM	97.5 FM	1,690 watts	B	Query	96-44	48°23′51″N 67°19′24.96″W
Marsoui	CBGA-12-FM	89.3 FM	41 watts	A1	Query		49°12′24.84″N 66°3′47.88″W
Saint-Maxime-du-Mont-Louis	CBGA-11-FM	106.1 FM	2,040 watts	A	Query		49°13′14.88″N 65°45′30.96″W
Gaspé (Rivière-au-Renard)	CBGA-3-FM	91.5 FM	40 watts	LP	Query	90-893-1	48°59′52.08″N 64°25′51.96″W
Sainte-Anne-des-Monts	CBGA-FM-7	101.1 FM	49,800 watts	C	Query	2005-98	49°6′6.84″N 66°17′11.04″W
Murdochville	CBGA-FM-6	97.7 FM	98 watts	A	Query	2013-183	48°57′56.16″N 65°28′40.08″W
Chandler	CBGA-FM-16	93.3 FM	1010 watts	A	Query	2011-677	48°18′15.12″N 64°41′52.08″W
New Richmond	CBGA-FM-17	104.3 FM	1030 watts	A	Query	2011-677	48°8′51″N 65°47′39.84″W
New Carlisle	CBGA-FM-1	98.7 FM	710 watts	A	Query	2011-677	48°0′32.04″N 65°19′30″W
Percé	CBGA-FM-18	104.5 FM	980 watts	B1	Query	2011-677	48°31′36.84″N 64°14′35.88″W
Port-Daniel–Gascons	CBGA-FM-19	92.5 FM	920 watts	A	Query	2011-677	48°8′21.12″N 64°59′7.08″W
Pointe-à-la-Garde	CBGA-FM-20	92.3 FM	1850 watts	B1	Query	2014-370	48°4′58.08″N 66°34′50.16″W
Matapédia	CBGA-FM-21	101.7 FM	268 watts	A	Query	2014-353	47°58′19.92″N 66°57′42.84″W

On August 30, 2011, the CBC has applied to close AM station CBGA-1, a 10,000 watt Class B repeater in Grande-Anse, New Brunswick, to be replaced with FM transmitters in Chandler, New Richmond, New Carlisle, Percé and Port-Daniel–Gascons. These transmitters were approved by the CRTC on October 28, 2011. The AM station mainly served listeners on the Quebec side of Chaleur Bay; listeners in the Bathurst area already receive Première programming from CBAF-FM-2 105.7 in Allardville, a repeater of CBAF-FM Moncton.

On January 4, 2013, the CBC filed an application to convert CBGA-6 1270 to 97.7 MHz. This application was approved by the CRTC on April 11, 2013.

During 2014, additional transmitters were applied for, and approved, in Escuminac and Matapédia.

CBGA-1 left the air in early December 2014, after the aforementioned FM rebroadcasters on the Quebec side of Chaleur Bay were activated.
