= The State We're In (radio program) =

Dutch-American radio program

The State We're In, or TSWI, was a podcast produced every other week by WBEZ, hosted and edited by Jonathan Groubert. The program airs documentary features and reports on "human rights, human wrongs and how we treat each other".

The program was formerly a Dutch-American radio program, produced by Radio Netherlands Worldwide in conjunction with WAMU-FM in Washington, DC. It was syndicated through National Public Radio, and was the first radio program produced in a non-anglophone country ever to gain network distribution on English-language radio in the United States. It was also carried on CBC Radio One in Canada and ABC Radio National in Australia.

The radio version of the show ended on Radio Netherlands Worldwide on 28 September 2012, due to cutbacks in public expenditure. The show was relaunched as a podcast format in November 2013 but subsequently stopped being carried by WBEZ.
