= The Fisheries Broadcast =

The Broadcast (formerly The Fisheries Broadcast) is a long-running radio program based in St. John's, Newfoundland and Labrador and has been airing on CBC Radio since 1951. It focuses on stories about Newfoundlanders whose jobs and livelihoods depend on the ocean. For years, it was originally known as The Fisherman's Broadcast (or Fishermen's), but has been affectionately known as The Broadcast. The current host is Paula Gale. The show was officially renamed The Broadcast on August 31, 2015.

The program currently airs on all CBC Radio One stations in Newfoundland and Labrador every weekday at 6:00 p.m. (5:30 AT).

The program celebrated its 75th anniversary on March 5, 2026, making it the longest-running daily radio show in Canada.
