= CBSI-FM =

Ici Radio-Canada Première station in Quebec

- Sept-Îles, Quebec; Canada
- Broadcast area: Côte-Nord, Labrador
- Frequency: 98.1 MHz

Programming
- Format: News/Talk
- Network: Ici Radio-Canada Première

Ownership
- Owner: Canadian Broadcasting Corporation

History
- First air date: December 12, 1976 (as a repeater of CBGA Matane); November 1, 1982 (as a local station)
- Call sign meaning: Canadian Broadcasting Corporation Sept-Îles

Technical information
- Class: C
- ERP: 96,700 watts
- HAAT: 260.5 metres
- Transmitter coordinates: 50°8′56.04″N 66°28′9.12″W

Links
- Website: Ici Radio-Canada Première

CBSI-FM is a French-language Canadian radio station located in Sept-Îles, Quebec.

Owned and operated by Société Radio-Canada, it broadcasts on 98.1 MHz with an effective radiated power of 96,700 watts (class C) using an omnidirectional antenna.

The station has an ad-free news/talk format and is part of the Ici Radio-Canada Première network, which operates across Canada.

== History ==
Formerly established on December 12, 1976, as a rebroadcaster of Matane's CBGA, CBSI-FM was launched as a separate station in 1982. The station now has several rebroadcasters of its own throughout Quebec's Côte-Nord and in parts of Labrador.

== Programming ==
The station's current local programs are Bonjour la côte, in the mornings from 6 a.m. to 9 a.m., and Boréale 138 in the afternoons, 3:30 p.m. to 6 p.m. CBSI-FM also co-produces D'Est en est, a pan-regional program produced in turn with CBGA-FM and CJBR-FM Rimouski, and heard afternoons during the summer months. On public holidays, its local programs are replaced with local shows airing provincewide produced by different outlets in turn (except Montreal and Quebec City). Its Saturday morning program, Samedi et rien d'autre, originates from CBF-FM Montreal.

== Transmitters ==
Rebroadcasters of CBSI-FM
City of licence	Identifier	Frequency	Power	Class	RECNet	CRTC Decision	Notes
Aguanish	CBSI-FM-14	105.9 FM	294 watts	A	Query	2022-24	50°13′22.08″N 62°4′36.12″W
Baie-Comeau	CBSI-FM-24	106.1 FM	1,900 watts	A	Query		49°13′59.16″N 68°8′29.04″W
Blanc-Sablon	CBSI-FM-21	107.1 FM	78 watts	A	Query		51°25′3″N 57°6′6.12″W
Fermont	CBSI-FM-6	100.5 FM	255 watts	A	Query	2000-164	52°49′13.08″N 67°5′27.96″W
Harrington Harbour	CBSI-FM-15	100.5 FM	93 watts	A1	Query	93-614	50°30′2.16″N 59°29′13.92″W
Havre-Saint-Pierre	CBSI-FM-7	92.5 FM	25,300 watts	B	Query	99-119	50°16′19.92″N 63°40′45.12″W
Natashquan	CBSI-FM-5	99.9 FM	260 watts	A1	Query	2018-53	50°10′50.88″N 61°48′37.08″W
Port-Menier	CBSI-23	*1130 AM; 99.9 FM	40; 270 watts	LP; A	Query	73-364; 2025-141	49°49′14.88″N 64°20′51″W
Rivière-Saint-Paul	CBSI-FM-20	103.1 FM	21 watts	A1	Query		51°28′45.12″N 57°42′56.16″W
La Romaine	CBSI-FM-8	99.9 FM	50 watts	LP	Query	2018-355	50°13′0.12″N 60°40′32.16″W
Saint-Augustin	CBSI-FM-18	107.3 FM	19 watts	A1	Query		51°14′12.12″N 58°38′26.16″W
Schefferville	CBSI-FM-2	91.1 FM	111 watts	A	Query	94-166	54°48′0″N 66°51′6.84″W
La Tabatière	CBSI-FM-17	100.1 FM	50 watts	A	Query	96-289	50°47′13.92″N 59°0′29.88″W
Tête-à-la-Baleine	CBSI-FM-16	103.5 FM	22 watts	A1	Query		50°42′18″N 59°18′36″W
Vieux-Fort	CBSI-FM-19	91.7 FM	26 watts	A1	Query		51°25′36.12″N 57°50′3.84″W
Churchill Falls, Newfoundland and Labrador	CBSI-FM-3	89.1 FM	98 watts	A1	Query	88-207	53°31′45.84″N 64°0′55.08″W
Labrador City, Newfoundland and Labrador	CBSI-FM-4	93.1 FM	255 watts	A	Query	95-441	52°56′52.08″N 66°54′56.88″W

In 1973, the CRTC approved the CBC's application to change the frequency of CBGR (later CBSI-23) Port-Menier, Quebec from 1420 kHz to 1130 kHz.

In 1975, the CRTC approved the CBC's application to change the frequency of CBGL (later CBSI-13) Mingan, Quebec from 1290 kHz to 740 kHz and was later deleted in 1999.

In 1986, the CBC received CRTC approval to switch frequencies on a number of CBSI low-power AM rebroadcasters in Quebec.

CBSI-FM-2 previously broadcast as CFKL, a local station owned by Hollinger-Ungava Transport Ltd. that operated at 1230 kHz. It is not known when the station began broadcasting, nor when it became a rebroadcaster of Radio-Canada, which acquired the station in 1965. By 1986, it was known as CBSI-2 (it would become CBSI-FM-2 upon conversion to 91.1 FM on July 15, 1994).

On September 1, 2017, the CBC applied to convert CBSI-5 1100 kHz to 99.9 MHz. On February 7, 2018, the CBC received approval from the CRTC to move CBSI-5 to 99.9 FM.

On April 19, 2018, the CBC applied to convert CBSI-8 1550 to 99.9 MHz. This was approved on September 6, 2018.

On November 23, 2021, the CBC submitted an application to convert CBSI-14 1350 to 105.9 MHz. The CRTC approved the CBC's application on February 2, 2022.

On April 10, 2025, the CBC submitted an application to convert CBSI-23 Port-Menier, Quebec from 1130 kHz to 99.9 MHz. CBSI-23 is currently the last low-power AM transmitters rebroadcasting CBSI-FM Sept-Îles and possibly one of the last remaining low-power CBC AM transmitters in Quebec. The CRTC approved the CBC's application to convert CBSI-23 Port-Menier from the AM band to the FM band on June 13, 2025.
