= Deep Roots (radio program) =

Canadian radio program

Deep Roots is a Canadian radio program focusing on folk and roots music. The program, hosted by Tom Power, airs on CBC Radio 2.

Power, who began the program while still attending Memorial University, is believed to be the youngest regular host of a CBC Radio program since Peter Jennings's tenure as host of Peter's People in 1947 (at the age of nine).

Deep Roots aired on Saturdays at 5:00 p.m. (6:00 AT, 6:30 NT) and Sundays at 5:00 p.m. (5:30 NT). It also airs on the Sirius XM feed of CBC Radio One (channel 169) Sundays at 10:00 p.m. ET and early Thursday mornings at 4:00 a.m. ET. As well, an abbreviated localized version of the program aired Fridays at 3:30 p.m. NT on Radio One stations in Newfoundland and Labrador. This is because the extended Friday portion of Q is preempted by the local version of Radio Noon at 12:00 NT, but would be out of place if rebroadcast later in the day, as is done for most Radio One programs airing in the 11:30 a.m. (local) timeslot.

As of October 2016, when Power took over as the host of Q, the program no longer airs as part of the regular CBC Radio 2 schedule; however, there are currently plans to keep the show active as a series of occasional specials.
