= CBZF-FM =

CBC Radio One station in New Brunswick, Canada

- Fredericton, New Brunswick; Canada
- Broadcast area: Central and Northwestern New Brunswick
- Frequency: 99.5 MHz (FM)

Programming
- Format: Public Radio - News/Talk
- Network: CBC Radio One

Ownership
- Owner: Canadian Broadcasting Corporation
- Sister stations: CBAT-DT

History
- First air date: March 4, 1964
- Former call signs: CBZ (1964–2004)
- Former frequencies: 970 kHz (1964–2004)
- Call sign meaning: Canadian Broadcasting Corporation Z Fredericton (F added in AM-FM conversion)

Technical information
- Class: A
- ERP: 3,200 watts
- HAAT: 82.9 meters (272 ft)

Links
- Website: CBC New Brunswick

CBZF-FM (99.5 MHz) is a non-commercial public radio station in Fredericton, capital city of the Canadian province of New Brunswick. It is the local Radio One station of the Canadian Broadcasting Corporation and is owned by the Canadian government. The studios are at 1160 Regent Street in Fredericton.

CBZF-FM is a Class A station, with an effective radiated power (ERP) of 3,200 watts. The tower is at a height above average terrain (HAAT) of 82.9 metres (272 ft). The transmitter is on Fernwood Drive in Fredericton. In addition to CBZF 99.5 FM, another Radio One station, CBD-FM 91.3 Saint John, can easily be heard in the provincial capital.

== History ==
CBC Radio programming first aired in Fredericton on privately owned network affiliate CFNB 550 AM. The CBC's own station launched on March 4, 1964. It was CBZ at 970 AM. Provincial Premier Louis Robichaud and Don Messer's troupe were on hand for the opening ceremonies which originated from the Lord Beaverbrook Hotel.

In 2004, CBZ moved to the FM band on 99.5 MHz. The call sign was changed to CBZF-FM, as CBZ-FM was already used by the CBC Radio 2 sister station.

== Local programming ==
CBZF currently produces a local morning news and current-affairs program, Information Morning with Jeanne Armstrong. It airs weekdays from 6:00 a.m. to 8:30 a.m. exclusively on 99.5 FM. CBZF also produces news and weather updates which are heard throughout the province weekdays between 9 a.m. and 6 p.m.

Information Morning is simulcast via television station CBAT-DT to the entire province. The program airs Monday to Friday from 6 a.m. to 8 a.m. on CBAT. CBZF also carries the provincial afternoon show Shift, which can be heard between 4 p.m. and 6 p.m. weekdays and comes from Fredericton.

== Current staff ==
- Jeanne Armstrong - Host of Information Morning
- Myfanwy Davies - Producer of Information Morning
- Sarah Trainer - Provincial Newsreader
- Vanessa Vander Valk - Host of Shift

== Notable Former Staff ==
- Hance Colburne - host of Information Morning
- Terry Seguin - host of Information Morning (Retired)

== Transmitters ==
Rebroadcasters of CBZF-FM
City of licence	Identifier	Frequency	Power	Class	RECNet	CRTC Decision	Notes
Boiestown	CBZB-FM	90.9 FM	836 watts	A	Query		46°27′15.84″N 66°25′12″W
Bon Accord	CBZC-FM	103.3 FM	44200 watts	C1	Query		46°38′57.84″N 67°35′33″W
Doaktown	CBZD-FM	96.5 FM	86 watts	A1	Query		46°34′18.84″N 66°7′49.08″W
Edmundston	CBAN-FM	99.5 FM	24000 watts	C1	Query	2003-412	47°23′21.12″N 68°18′57.96″W
McAdam	CBZF-FM-1	95.5 FM	50 watts	LP	Query	2017-396	45°34′50.16″N 67°20′33″W
Woodstock	CBZW-FM	95.3 FM	15 watts	LP	Query	96-623 2008-292	46°10′40.08″N 67°33′0″W

In the 1970s, CBAM Edmundston changed its low-power AM frequency from 1490 kHz to 1320 kHz. CBAN-FM in Edmundston previously used the CBAM call sign until 2003, when it converted to FM at 99.5 MHz. That call sign now belongs to CBAM-FM in Moncton, which adopted it after CBA moved to FM in 2007.

On September 1, 2017, the CBC applied to convert CBAX from 600 kHz to 95.5 MHz. The new callsign will be CBZF-FM-1. CBAX was the last low-power AM transmitter to rebroadcast CBZF-FM and also the last low-power CBC AM transmitter in the province. The CRTC approved the CBC's application to move CBAX to 95.5 FM on November 3, 2017.
