= CBYG-FM =

Radio station in Prince George, British Columbia

- Prince George, British Columbia; Canada
- Broadcast area: Northern Interior
- Frequency: 91.5 MHz

Programming
- Format: News/Talk
- Network: CBC Radio One

Ownership
- Owner: Canadian Broadcasting Corporation

History
- First air date: 1987
- Call sign meaning: Canadian Broadcasting Corporation Y Prince George

Technical information
- Class: C
- ERP: 100 kW
- HAAT: 329.6 metres (1,081 ft)
- Transmitter coordinates: 53.935556°N 122.468056°W

Links
- Website: CBC British Columbia

CBYG-FM is a Canadian radio station, which broadcasts the programming of the CBC Radio One network in Prince George, British Columbia. The station airs at 91.5 FM, with an Effective Radiated Power of 100,000 watts and an antenna Height Above Average Terrain of 331.5 meters.

== History ==
The station was launched in 1987 as a rebroadcaster of CBU Vancouver. Prior to its launch, CBC Radio programming aired on private affiliate CKPG. Local programming was introduced in 1988 when CBYG was issued a separate licence.

== Local programming ==
CBYG and CFPR in Prince Rupert jointly produce the local morning program Daybreak North. Carolina de Ryk conducts interviews and introduces segments from the studio in Prince Rupert while Bill Fee presents news, roads and weather from the studio in Prince George. Both stations air CBTK-FM's Radio West in the afternoons.

== Rebroadcasters ==
Rebroadcasters of CBYG-FM
City of licence	Identifier	Frequency	Power	Class	RECNet	Notes
Hagensborg	CBYI-FM	88.1 FM	374 watts	A	Query	52°24′15″N 126°28′25″W
Bella Coola	CBYD-FM	103.5 FM	100 watts	A1	Query	52°22′31″N 126°42′35″W
Wells	CBYW	540 AM	40 watts	LP	Query	53°6′25″N 121°32′45″W
Kersley	CBYY-FM	90.9 FM	130 watts	B	Query	52°52′56″N 122°20′13″W
Granisle	CBKG	920 AM	40 watts	LP	Query	54°52′53″N 126°12′6″W
Dawson Creek	CBKQ-FM	89.7 FM	1,100 watts	B	Query	55°43′44″N 120°26′47″W
Fort St. John	CBYJ-FM	88.3 FM	7,000 watts	B	Query	56°16′47″N 121°2′33″W
Vanderhoof	CBRV-FM	96.7 FM	508 watts	A	Query	54°0′14″N 124°0′39″W
Fort St. James	CBUV-FM	91.9 FM	739 watts	B	Query	54°26′7″N 124°32′59″W
Fort Fraser	CBXR-FM	102.9 FM	246 watts	A	Query	54°1′46″N 124°37′32″W
Burns Lake	CBXB-FM	99.1 FM	1,030 watts	B1	Query	54°15′24″N 125°40′42″W
Houston	CBUR-FM	102.1 FM	794 watts	B1	Query	54°26′32″N 126°39′36″W
Smithers	CBRS-FM	97.5 FM	881 watts	A	Query	54°44′27″N 126°58′56″W
Moricetown	CBTI-FM	96.5 FM	218 watts	A1	Query	54°58′54″N 127°17′54″W
McBride	CBTC-FM	92.1 FM	2,400 watts	A	Query	53°16′55″N 120°14′3″W
Tumbler Ridge	CBTU-FM	89.9 FM	70 watts	A1	Query	55°7′57″N 120°58′52″W
Valemount	CBTV-FM	90.3 FM	180 watts	A1	Query	52°50′34″N 119°15′24″W
Bella Bella	CBTX-FM	89.9 FM	295 watts	A	Query	52°9′25″N 128°6′51″W
Fort Nelson	CBUO-FM	88.3 FM	223 watts	A	Query	58°48′44″N 122°42′57″W
Chetwynd	CBUZ-FM	93.5 FM	180 watts	A	Query	55°40′6″N 121°34′59″W
Mackenzie	CBWF	920 AM	40 watts	LP	Query	55°19′52″N 123°5′45″W
Ocean Falls	CBXO-FM	92.1 FM	6 watts	A1	Query	52°21′19″N 127°41′26″W
Hudson's Hope	CBYG-FM-2	103.1 FM	124 watts	A1	Query	56°1′40″N 121°55′11″W
Tatalrose	CFUG-FM	94.9 FM	170 watts	A	Query	53°52′14″N 126°0′41″W; Community-owned
Dease Lake	VF2141	98.1 FM	1 watt	A	Query	58°25′39″N 130°0′57″W; Community-owned
Anahim Lake	CBYG-FM-1	98.1 FM	24 watts	LP	Query	52°21′3″N 125°19′8″W; Community-owned

On August 24, 2015, the CBC submitted an application to convert CBXU 940 to 103.1 MHz. The CRTC approved the CBC's application on November 16, 2015.

On June 10, 2024, the CBC applied to the CRTC to convert CBWF Mackenzie from AM 920 kHz to FM 99.9 MHz. The application was approved on August 22, 2024.
