= CHAK (AM) =

Radio station in Inuvik

- Inuvik, Northwest Territories; Canada
- Broadcast area: Western Arctic
- Frequency: 860 kHz

Programming
- Format: News/Talk
- Network: CBC Radio One; CBC North

Ownership
- Owner: Canadian Broadcasting Corporation
- Sister stations: CHAK-TV (defunct)

History
- First air date: 1947
- Call sign meaning: Aklavik, original station location

Technical information
- Class: B
- Power: 1,000 watts
- Transmitter coordinates: 68°21′30″N 133°43′30″W

Links
- Website: cbc.ca/north

CHAK is a Canadian radio station, broadcasting at 860 AM in Inuvik, Northwest Territories. The station broadcasts the programming of the CBC Radio One network known as CBC North.

== History ==
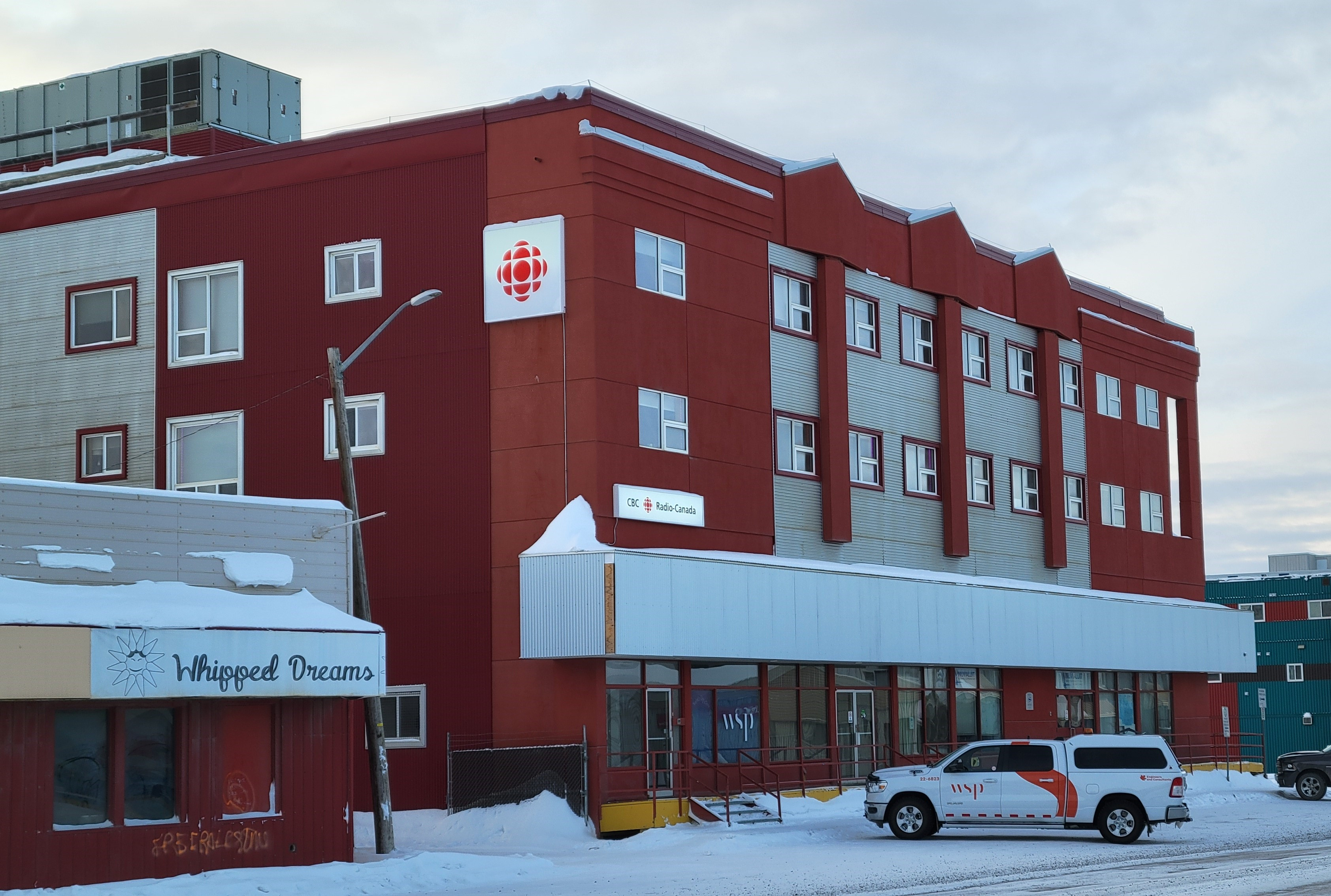
Building hosting CHAK in Inuvik

CHAK was launched in 1947 as a local community station in neighbouring Aklavik on 1230 AM. A new station was built by the CBC in the new town of Inuvik to replace the old station in Aklavik. The new CHAK went on the air on November 26, 1960, on 860. The station was now part of the CBC Northern Radio Service. CHAK received CBC news and topical programs by picking up CBX Edmonton and relaying the broadcast. Tapes recorded in Montreal were also flown in on regular airline flights. Eventually the station was linked into the primary CBC network feed.

The history of CHAK originated prior to 1960 and called itself "CHAK, the friendly voice of the Arctic". According to the Canadian Communications Foundation, the station began broadcasting on 1230 kHz in 1947, mainly for community broadcasts such as church services and special messages to people in the bush and the Arctic. The station was originally operated by the Canadian Army and volunteers, particularly the daughter of the Hudson Bay manager, and was one of Canada's most northerly radio stations. A year later, CHAK was airing CBC's school programs at the request of the Department of Mines and Resources. In 1953, CHAK received federal approval to change frequencies to 1490. It is unknown if the station had moved back to 1230, prior to CHAK's launch in 1960.

== Local programming ==
During the network's primary local programming breaks, CHAK airs the same programs as CFYK-FM in Yellowknife, including The Trailbreaker on weekday mornings, the noon-hour program Northwind, Trail's End in the afternoon, and Northern Air on weekend mornings.

However, the two stations diverge from Radio One network programming in the afternoon, producing separate programming streams for their local First Nations (Gwich'in) and Inuit (Inuvialuit) communities. CHAK airs Nantaii in Gwich'in from 1:00 to 2:00 p.m. and Tusaavik in Inuvialuktun from 3:00 until 4 p.m.

CHAK has two rebroadcasters in Nunavut, both in communities where CFFB, the CBC North station in Iqaluit, also broadcasts. This is done in order to provide CHAK's afternoon Indigenous programming to these communities, as CFFB's afternoon schedule concentrates on programming in Inuktitut.

== Transmitters ==
Rebroadcasters of CHAK-FM
| City of licence | Identifier | Frequency | Power | Class | RECNet | CRTC Decision | Notes |
|---|---|---|---|---|---|---|---|
| Aklavik^{2} | CBAK-FM | 97.7 FM | 50 watts | LP | Query | 85-829; 2019-149 | 68°13′13.08″N 135°1′51.60″W |
| Cambridge Bay, Nunavut | CBIN-FM | 105.1 FM | 82 watts | A1 | Query | | 69°7′14.16″N 105°2′13.20″W |
| Fort Good Hope | CBQE-FM | 105.1 FM | 177 watts | A1 | Query | 94-563 | 66°15′43.92″N 128°37′40.80″W |
| Fort McPherson^{3} | CBAH-FM | 99.9 FM | 50 watts | LP | Query | 94-120 | 67°25′39″N 134°51′54″W |
| Kugluktuk, Nunavut | CBIO-FM | 105.1 FM | 82 watts | A1 | Query | | 67°49′36.84″N 115°4′55.20″W |
| Norman Wells | CBDW-FM | 99.9 FM | 40 watts | LP | Query | 2017-215 | 65°16′28.92″N 126°47′9.60″W |
| Paulatuk^{1} | VF2417 | 107.1 FM | 8 watts | LP | Query | | 69°20′0.96″N 124°3′50.40″W |
| Tuktoyaktuk^{5} | CBAC-FM | 99.9 FM | 261 watts | | Query | 2005-415; 2014-468 | 69°26′30.12″N 133°0′18″W |
| Tulita^{4} | CBXY-FM | 100.9 FM | 50 watts | LP | Query | 2013-227 | 64°54′6.84″N 125°34′19.20″W |
| Ulukhaktok^{1} | CKHI-FM | 105.1 FM | 9 watts | LP | Query | | 70°44′11.04″N 117°45′57.60″W |

=== Notes ===
In Paulatuk and Ulukhaktok, CHAK's signal is rebroadcast on transmitters owned by local community groups rather than by the CBC. Three further community transmitters operating on 107.1 in Colville Lake, 107.1 in Sachs Harbour and 100.1 in Old Crow, Yukon are unlicensed by the CRTC under its exemption for low-power community radio undertakings.

Tuktoyaktuk Broadcasting Society opened CFCT on 600 kHz with 1,000 watts at 6:45 p.m. MST, on January 20, 1971. In 2005, CFCT became a rebroadcaster of CHAK, changed frequencies to 1150 kHz and changed its call sign to CBAC. On September 11, 2014, the CRTC approved the CBC's application to convert CBAC to 99.9 MHz.

Rebroadcaster CBAK originally received CRTC approval in 1985 to operate a low-power transmitter at Aklavik on 540 kHz. In 1998, CBAK received approval to change frequencies to 1210 kHz with the power remaining at 40 watts.

==== AM to FM ====
In 1994, the CRTC approved an application from the CBC to change CBQM's frequency from 680 to 690 kHz. On April 19, 2013, the CBC applied with the CRTC to convert CBQM to 99.9 MHz. The application was approved on September 19, 2013. The callsign was changed to CBAH-FM.

On May 8, 2013, the CBC received CRTC approval to convert CBQI 920 to 100.9 MHz. The callsign was then changed to CBXY-FM.

On March 15, 2017, the CBC applied to convert CBDW 990 to 99.9 MHz. This application was approved on June 23, 2017.

On March 12, 2019, the CBC applied to convert CBAK 1210 to 97.7 MHz. This application was approved on May 14, 2019.

== See also ==
- CHAK-TV (defunct CBC Television outlet in Inuvik)
