= CBC Radio One =

Canadian public news and information radio network

- Country: Canada

Ownership
- Owner: Canadian Broadcasting Corporation

History
- Launch date: November 2, 1936; 90 years ago
- Former names: CBC Radio (1936–44, 1962–97); Trans-Canada Network (1944–62)

Coverage
- Availability: AM and FM frequencies across Canada; Bell Satellite TV; Shaw Direct; SiriusXM

Links
- Website: cbc.ca/radio

CBC Radio One is the English-language news and information radio network of the publicly owned Canadian Broadcasting Corporation. It is commercial-free and offers local and national programming. It is available on AM and FM to 98 percent of Canadians and overseas over the Internet, and through mobile apps. CBC Radio One is simulcast across Canada on Bell Satellite TV satellite channels 956 and 953, and Shaw Direct satellite channel 870. A modified version of Radio One, with local content replaced by additional airings of national programming, is available on Sirius XM channel 169. It is downlinked to subscribers via SiriusXM Canada and its U.S.-based counterpart, Sirius XM Satellite Radio.

In 2010, Radio One reached 4.3 million listeners each week. It was the largest radio network in Canada.

== History ==
CBC Radio began in 1936, and is the oldest branch of the corporation. In 1949, the facilities and staff of the Broadcasting Corporation of Newfoundland were transferred to CBC upon Newfoundland's entry into Canadian Confederation.

Beginning in 1944, the CBC operated two English-language radio services: the original network became the Trans-Canada Network, and a second network, the Dominion Network, was established with CJBC in Toronto as its flagship. With the exception of CJBC, all 35 stations on the CBC Dominion Network were privately owned affiliates. Its programming tended to be lighter than that of the Trans-Canada Network, carrying more American programming in its schedule. The Dominion Network operated only in the evenings, freeing affiliates to air local programming during the day.

Until 1958, the CBC was both a broadcaster, and the principal broadcast regulator in Canada. It used this dual role to take most of Canada's clear-channel frequencies on the AM band.

In 1962, the Dominion Network was dissolved and within a few years CJBC became a French-language station broadcasting the programming of Radio-Canada.

In 1960, the CBC began running distinct programming on its three existing FM English-language stations, which had been providing simulcasts of programming on its AM stations. The stations, located in Toronto, Ottawa and Montreal, broadcast a monoaural FM signal. Programming consisted mostly of classical music. The stations were linked by CN/CP Telecommunications via land-line and microwave. This service was discontinued in 1962, but resumed in 1964 in stereo. Eventually, a national satellite-distributed network of stereo FM stations was established. In 1975, the FM network was called CBC Stereo, and the AM service was designated CBC Radio.

In the late 1960s and early 1970s, CBC Radio increased its current affairs and documentary content with an initiative known as the "Radio Revolution", using more ambitious, live coverage of news and current affairs including listeners as well as experts. The change began with national shows such as As It Happens. The change spread to CBC regional morning shows which developed three hours of live radio combining "survival information", about news, weather and traffic, with interviews and documentaries about local and national issues. CBC Radio Winnipeg was the first to embrace the format followed by Information Morning in Halifax, a move which increased audience and attracted coverage in Time magazine.

CBC Radio stopped running commercials in 1974. Until 1995, the network signed off the air between 1:00 a.m. and 6:00 a.m. daily (5:00 a.m. weekdays on its Toronto flagship station, CBL)– in that year, it launched an overnight program, CBC Radio Overnight, which airs international news and documentary programs.

Radio One logo, 1997–2007

In the early 1990s, the CBC began offering selected programs on the Internet. In September 1996, the network formally launched live audio streaming of both CBC Radio and CBC Stereo.

Since the 1980s, many of the CBC's AM stations moved to FM in response to complaints of poor AM reception. This meant that the old distinction between the AM "Radio" network and the FM "Stereo" network was no longer accurate, even though many of the FM "Radio" stations broadcast in mono only. As a result, on September 1, 1997, CBC Radio became CBC Radio One and CBC Stereo became CBC Radio 2 (it is now CBC Music). Although some Radio One stations still broadcast on AM as of 2018, because of issues with urban reception of AM radio signals many of the remaining AM stations have added FM rebroadcasters in major urban centres within their broadcast area.

=== CBC Radio One today ===
From 2004 until early 2007, CBC Radio One promotional spots were announced by Canadian actress Shauna MacDonald, also known as "Promo Girl". Toronto-born Jeremy Harris took over from MacDonald. Until fall 2005, promos ended with one of two slogans: either "Because sometimes a picture needs a thousand words" or "Hear the big picture". Until early 2015, the slogan was "Canada Lives Here." The slogan was not replaced.

In the fall of 2021, CBC Radio One's weekend evening programing was reorganized. With the removal of two-hour programs, with Vinyl Tap cancelled and Saturday Night Blues relegated to CBC Music, Saturday night programming features various music programs from CBC Music. In contrast, the Sunday night programming has the network's various spoken-word narrative programs concentrated from 7 p.m. to 12 a.m. (Eastern).

Some CBC Radio One programs, such as As It Happens, air in the United States on some stations associated with Public Radio International. Definitely Not the Opera, Quirks & Quarks, The Vinyl Cafe, and Q are heard on some public stations in the northern United States. Some CBC-SRC programs were relayed on Radio Canada International for listeners abroad and others, such as the 2010 summer program Promised Land, have aired on Sirius Satellite Radio 169.

== CBC Radio One stations ==
Only stations licensed by the Canadian Radio-television and Telecommunications Commission as separate broadcast undertakings are listed below. Most—though not all—of these stations produce at least one local program. Most stations also have numerous rebroadcasters in smaller communities within their service areas; rebroadcasters are listed in each primary station's article.

Call sign	Location	Province/ Territory	Morning program	Midday program	Afternoon/Evening program
CBR (Note: This station has a "nested" FM rebroadcaster within its home market.)	Calgary	Alberta	Calgary Eyeopener	Alberta@noon	The Homestretch
CBX	Edmonton	Alberta	Edmonton AM	Alberta@noon	Radio Active
CBU	Vancouver	British Columbia	The Early Edition	B.C. Today	On The Coast
CBCV-FM	Victoria	British Columbia	On The Island	B.C. Today	All Points West
CBTK-FM	Kelowna	British Columbia	Daybreak South	B.C. Today	Radio West (Mo-We)
CBYK-FM	Kamloops	British Columbia	Daybreak Kamloops	B.C. Today	Radio West (Mo-We)
CBYG-FM	Prince George	British Columbia	Daybreak North	B.C. Today	Radio West (Mo-We)
CFPR	Prince Rupert	British Columbia	Daybreak North	B.C. Today	Radio West (Mo-We)
CBW	Winnipeg	Manitoba	Information Radio	Radio Noon	Up To Speed
CBWK-FM (Note: This station is licensed as a separate broadcast undertaking, but produces no programming of its own.)	Thompson	Manitoba	Information Radio	Radio Noon	Up To Speed
CBZF-FM	Fredericton	New Brunswick	Information Morning	Maritime Noon	Shift
CBD-FM	Saint John	New Brunswick	Information Morning	Maritime Noon	Shift
CBAM-FM	Moncton	New Brunswick	Information Morning	Maritime Noon	Shift
CBN	St. John's	Newfoundland and Labrador	The St. John's Morning Show	The Signal	On The Go, The Fisheries Broadcast
CBG	Gander	Newfoundland and Labrador	CBC Newfoundland Morning	The Signal	On The Go, The Fisheries Broadcast
CBT-FM	Grand Falls-Windsor	Newfoundland and Labrador	CBC Newfoundland Morning	The Signal	On The Go, The Fisheries Broadcast
CBY	Corner Brook	Newfoundland and Labrador	CBC Newfoundland Morning	The Signal	On The Go, The Fisheries Broadcast
CFGB-FM	Happy Valley-Goose Bay	Newfoundland and Labrador	Labrador Morning	The Signal	On The Go, The Fisheries Broadcast
CBDQ-FM	Labrador City	Newfoundland and Labrador	Labrador Morning	The Signal	On The Go, The Fisheries Broadcast
CFYK-FM	Yellowknife	Northwest Territories	ᖁᓪᓕᖅ (Qulliq), The Trailbreaker	Northwind	Tide Godi, Dehcho Dene, Denesuline Yatia, Trail's End
CHAK	Inuvik	Northwest Territories	ᖁᓪᓕᖅ (Qulliq), The Trailbreaker	Northwind	Nantaii, Le Gots'hedeh, Tusaavik, Trail's End
CBHA	Halifax	Nova Scotia	Information Morning (Nova Scotia)	Maritime Noon	Mainstreet (Nova Scotia)
CBI	Sydney	Nova Scotia	Information Morning (Cape Breton)	Maritime Noon	Mainstreet (Cape Breton)
CFFB	Iqaluit	Nunavut	ᖁᓪᓕᖅ (Qulliq)	ᓂᐱᕗᑦ (Nipivut)	ᑕᐅᓱᓐᓂ (Tausunni), ᑐᑦᑕᕕᒃ (Tuttavik), ᑐᓵᔭᒃᓴᑦ (Tusaajaksat), (Note: Tusaajaksat originates from CBQR-FM in Rankin Inlet, Nunavut.) Tusaavik, Sinnaksautit
CFFB-FM-5	Kuujjuaq	Quebec (Nunavik)	Quebec A.M., ᖁᓪᓕᖅ (Qulliq)	ᓂᐱᕗᑦ (Nipivut)	ᑕᐅᓱᓐᓂ (Tausunni), ᑐᑦᑕᕕᒃ (Tuttavik), ᑐᓵᔭᒃᓴᑦ (Tusaajaksat), Tusaavik, Sinnaksautit
CBO-FM	Ottawa	Ontario	Ottawa Morning	Ontario Today	All in a Day
CBLA-FM	Toronto	Ontario	Metro Morning (Note: CBLA-FM also produces Ontario Morning for rebroadcasters in Southern Ontario, including CBCK-FM in Kingston and CBCF-FM in Peterborough, rebroadcasters of CBO-FM and CBLA-FM, respectively.)	Ontario Today	Here and Now
CBLA-FM-2	Kitchener-Waterloo (Paris)	Ontario	The Morning Edition	Ontario Today	Here and Now
CBCL-FM	London	Ontario	London Morning	Ontario Today	Afternoon Drive
CBEW-FM	Windsor	Ontario	Windsor Morning	Ontario Today	Afternoon Drive
CBCS-FM	Greater Sudbury	Ontario	Morning North	Ontario Today	Up North
CBQT-FM	Thunder Bay	Ontario	Superior Morning	Ontario Today	Up North
CBCT-FM	Charlottetown	Prince Edward Island	Island Morning	Maritime Noon	Mainstreet (PEI)
CBME-FM	Montreal	Quebec	Daybreak Montreal	Radio Noon	Let's Go
CBVE-FM	Quebec City	Quebec	Quebec A.M.	Radio Noon	Breakaway
CBMP-FM	Chisasibi	Quebec	Quebec A.M., ᐗᓂᔥᑳᒄ (Winschgaoug)	ᐃᔨᔨᐤ ᑎᐹᒋᒧᐎᓐ (Eyou Dipajimoon)	ᐗᓂᔥᑳᒄ (Winschgaoug), Breakaway
CBK	Regina (Watrous)	Saskatchewan	The Morning Edition	Blue Sky	The 306
CBKA-FM	La Ronge	Saskatchewan	The Morning Edition	Blue Sky	The 306
CBK-1-FM	Saskatoon	Saskatchewan	Saskatoon Morning	Blue Sky	The 306
CFWH-FM	Whitehorse	Yukon	Yukon Morning	Midday Cafe	Airplay

== Shortwave relays of Radio One ==
Several shortwave radio relays of CBC Radio One once existed to provide coverage to remote areas that could not otherwise receive radio broadcasts. The only such operation still licensed is CKZN, relaying CFGB-FM from Happy Valley-Goose Bay, Newfoundland and Labrador with a 1 kW ERP signal on a fixed frequency of 6.16 MHz.

Former shortwave relays include CKCX, providing a relay of CBC North programming, and CKZU, relaying CBU from Vancouver. CKCX and CKZU ceased operations in 2012 and 2017, respectively.

== Programming ==
Most schedules include hourly news readings that run from 4–10 minutes on the top of the hour except for major programming like the 6:00 p.m. news show, Your World Tonight, and the Sunday afternoon call-in show, Cross Country Checkup. Some mid-day programs include only brief 90-second "information updates".

On statutory holidays, local programming, particularly the morning shows, is replaced by special provincial programming or regional programs are broadcast province-wide on a rotating basis. Typically for the noon and late afternoon time slots, national programs in the form of documentary specials are aired as well. In the summer months of July and August, some programming is temporarily shortened and/or replaced by special summer series. For Christmas Day, the majority of the programming, beginning at 8:00 PM on Christmas Eve, is replaced with predominately holiday music showcases.

Stations in the Canadian territories air a significantly different schedule with expanded local programming that includes a number of programs in local Indigenous languages. They air most of the core CBC Radio One schedule, although some programs may air in abbreviated versions (see CBC North for further information).

The network also airs some programming syndicated from American public broadcasting services such as National Public Radio and Public Radio Exchange, including programs from the now defunct Public Radio International which merged with PRX in 2019, This American Life, Radiolab and the news series The World and, previously, The State We're In. With the exceptions of This American Life, which airs on Sunday nights at 8:00 p.m. and RadioLab which airs on Sunday nights at 9:00 p.m., all other non-Canadian content airs after 1:00 a.m. as part of the CBC Radio Overnight programming block.

=== Sirius XM ===
The Radio One feed on Sirius XM Satellite Radio largely follows the Eastern Time schedule, and has no local programming, with repeats of other shows in time slots that would normally be occupied by local programming. As a consequence of using a single feed, most national programming outside the Eastern Time Zone is heard earlier or later than the regional outlet on terrestrial radio - for example: The World at Six is heard on Sirius XM as early as 3:00 p.m. Pacific Time in Vancouver, and as late as 7:30 p.m. Newfoundland Time in St. John's.

Programs produced by NPR and PRX are not heard on CBC Radio One's Sirius XM service, as these are covered by channels programmed by NPR and PRX. In addition, the programs featured on CBC Radio Overnight are not heard on the Sirius XM feed. In these cases, as with the regional programming slots, repeats of earlier national programs are heard, as well as some CBC Music programming (such as Deep Roots).

=== Podcasting ===
Many CBC Radio programs are also distributed in podcast versions. In addition, the service has also created several programs which are distributed exclusively as podcasts. Original podcasts include Campus, a program devoted to stories about college and university student life; Someone Knows Something, which presents information about criminal cold cases; Uncover, an investigative journalism project; Missing and Murdered, which delves into stories of missing and murdered Indigenous women; and Back Story, in which foreign correspondents talk about the news stories they have covered.

Selected episodes from the podcasts may also sometimes air terrestrially on CBC Radio One as substitute programs, or rerun material for regular programs such as The Current, such as during the summer season or when a regularly scheduled program is preempted due to a statutory holiday.

== Former affiliates ==
While all CBC Radio stations today are owned and operated by the network there previously were a number of privately owned network affiliates of what is now CBC Radio One and its predecessors, the Trans-Canada Network, and the original CBC Radio network. Some were affiliates of the original CBC radio network prior to 1944, several of which had previously been affiliates of the CBC's predecessor, the Canadian Radio Broadcasting Commission. Some were affiliates of the Trans-Canada Network (1944–1962) and either disaffiliated from TCN or became CBC Radio affiliates when TCN became CBC Radio in 1962. Some transferred their affiliation to CBC Radio when the Dominion Network dissolved in 1962. Most affiliates disaffiliated as the CBC built new owned and operated stations, expanded coverage by other stations, or built transmitters to rebroadcast existing CBC Radio stations. Other affiliates were purchased from their owners by the CBC and are listed under CBC Radio One stations above or at List of defunct CBC radio transmitters in Canada if they are no longer operating.

Stations that have disaffiliated:

- CFAC, Calgary - lost affiliation in 1948 with the launch of CBX.
- CFAR, Flin Flon - disaffiliated in 1984 after CBC launched CBWF-FM.
- CFCH, North Bay - disaffiliated in 1976 with the launch of CBCN-FM.
- CFCY, Charlottetown - transferred from the Dominion network in 1962. Disaffiliated in 1977 with the opening of CBCT-FM.
- CFGP, Grande Prairie - disaffiliated in 1981 after the opening of CBXP-FM.
- CFJC, Kamloops - disaffiliated in 1977 with the launch of CBYK-FM.
- CFNB, Fredericton - disaffiliated in 1964 with the launch of CBZ.
- CFOB, Fort Frances - transferred from the Dominion network in 1962 as CKFI. Disaffiliated after the opening of CBQ in 1973.
- CFOM, Quebec City - as CJQC transferred from the Dominion network in 1962. Became CFOM in 1964. Closed in 1975, replaced by CBVE-FM.
- CFOR, Orillia - transferred from the Dominion network in 1962. Disaffiliated in 1964.
- CFOS, Owen Sound - transferred from the Dominion network in 1962. Disaffiliated and replaced by CBCB-FM, a rebroadcaster of CBL, in 1983.
- CFPA, Port Arthur - transferred from the Dominion network in 1962. Disaffiliated in 1972 with the launch of CBQ.
- CFPL, London - transferred from the Dominion network in 1962. Disaffiliated, replaced by CBCL-FM in 1978.
- CFRC, Kingston - owned and operated Queen's University in partnership with the Kingston Whig-Standard newspaper. Affiliation transferred to the more powerful CKWS when the newspaper opened that station in 1942.
- CFRN, Edmonton - transferred from the Dominion network in 1962. Disaffiliated in 1964 when CBR launched.
- CFVR, Abbotsford - established in 1962 as a semi-satellite of CHWK. Disaffiliated in 1981 with the launch of a repeater of CBU.
- CHAT, Medicine Hat - transferred from the Dominion network in 1962. Disaffiliated in 1994 with the launch of CBRM-FM.
- CHSJ, St. John - was an affiliate of the Trans-Canada Network until 1962 when that network was merged with the Dominion Network to become CBC Radio. CHSJ remained a CBC Radio affiliate. The CBC opened CBD in 1964 but CHSJ is listed as remaining a CBC affiliate until at least 1980.
- CHWK, Chilliwack - transferred from the Dominion network in 1962. Disaffiliated in 1981 with the launch of a repeater of CBU.
- CJAT, Trail - disaffiliated in 1977 as a result of the launch of CBTA-FM.
- CJCA, Edmonton - disaffiliated in 1962 with the dissolution of the Trans-Canada Network. CFRN, the former Dominion Network affiliate, remained as an affiliate of the combined CBC Radio network.
- CJIC, - Sault Ste. Marie - disaffiliated in 1981 with the launch of CBSM-FM. Closed in 1992.
- CJOC, Lethbridge - disaffiliated in 1978 as CBRX-FM had signed on.
- CJVI, Victoria - transferred from the Dominion network in 1962. Disaffiliated in 1991.
- CJWA, Wawa - disaffiliated in 1985 with the opening of CBLJ, a retransmitter of CBCS-FM.
- CKCK, Regina - remained a Trans-Canada Network affiliate until 1962 when the network was merged with the Dominion network to become CBC Radio.
- CKCR, Kitchener - transferred from the Dominion network in 1962. Disaffiliation granted in 1966 by Board of Broadcast Governors over CBC's objections.
- CKCV, Quebec City - disaffiliated in 1962 with the merger of the Trans-Canada Network and the Dominion Network and went from being a bilingual to a French-only station, with CFOM continuing as a CBC Radio affiliate.
- CKGB, Timmins - disaffiliated in 1984 with the launch of CBCJ-FM.
- CKLN, Nelson - remained a CBC affiliate until at least 1968.
- CKOC, Hamilton - was allowed to disaffiliate in 1962 as Hamilton was in range of CBL Toronto's signal.
- CKOR, Penticton - transferred from the Dominion network in 1962. Disaffiliated in 1977 as a result of the launch of CBTP-FM.
- CKOV, Kelowna - disaffiliated in 1977 with the opening of a CBC repeater. CBTK-FM was launched in 1987.
- CKPR, Fort William - disaffiliated in 1962 with the merger of the Trans-Canada Network and Dominion Network. Former Dominion affiliate CFPA, in neighbouring Port Arthur, continued as the affiliate of the consolidated CBC Radio network.
- CKSO, Sudbury - disaffiliated in 1978 with CBCS-FM signing on.
- CKWS, Kingston - disaffiliated in 1978 with the opening of CBCK-FM.
- CKX, Brandon - transferred from the Dominion network in 1962. Disaffiliated in 1978 with the opening of CBWS-FM.

For former Dominion Network affiliates, see Dominion Network#Stations

== See also ==
- Ici Radio-Canada Première, the CBC's French language equivalent to CBC Radio One
