= CBQT-FM =

CBC Radio One station in Thunder Bay, Ontario

- Thunder Bay, Ontario; Canada
- Broadcast area: Northwestern Ontario
- Frequency: 88.3 MHz

Programming
- Format: News/Talk
- Network: CBC Radio One

Ownership
- Owner: Canadian Broadcasting Corporation

History
- First air date: 1973
- Former call signs: CBQ (1973–1990)
- Former frequencies: 800 kHz (1973–1990)
- Call sign meaning: Canadian Broadcasting Corporation Quetico Thunder Bay

Technical information
- Class: B
- ERP: 23,730 watts
- HAAT: 194.7 metres (639 ft)

Links
- Website: CBC Thunder Bay

CBQT-FM is a Canadian radio station. It is the CBC Radio One station in Thunder Bay, Ontario, broadcasting at 88.3 FM, and serves all of Northwestern Ontario through a network of relay transmitters.

== History ==
The station was launched in 1973 as CBQ on 800 AM. The 800 frequency had been vacated earlier that year by the defunct CJLX, an independent private station which had begun broadcasting in 1959 but went off the air on March 31, 1973 upon expiry of that station's licence after its parent company, Lakehead Broadcasting, failed to renew the licence amid questions about the station's ownership. After the CBC acquired the 800 frequency and the studio facilities of CJLX on Miles Street, CBQ's inaugural morning broadcast in December 1973 made it the second city in Ontario to get a regional broadcast centre. The call sign CBQ was a last minute choice by station managers since CBL (for Lakehead) or CBT (for Thunder Bay) were already taken by the CBC stations in Toronto and Grand Falls-Windsor, Newfoundland and Labrabor, respectively. Instead the letter Q was chosen for Quetico Provincial Park near Atikokan, which is west of Thunder Bay.

Prior to CBQ's launch, CBC Radio programming aired on private affiliate CFPA.

CBQ moved to FM as CBQT-FM in 1990. The CBQ-FM callsign was already in use by the CBC Stereo sister station on 101.7 FM. Some of the relay transmitters for CBQT previously rebroadcast CBL in Toronto.

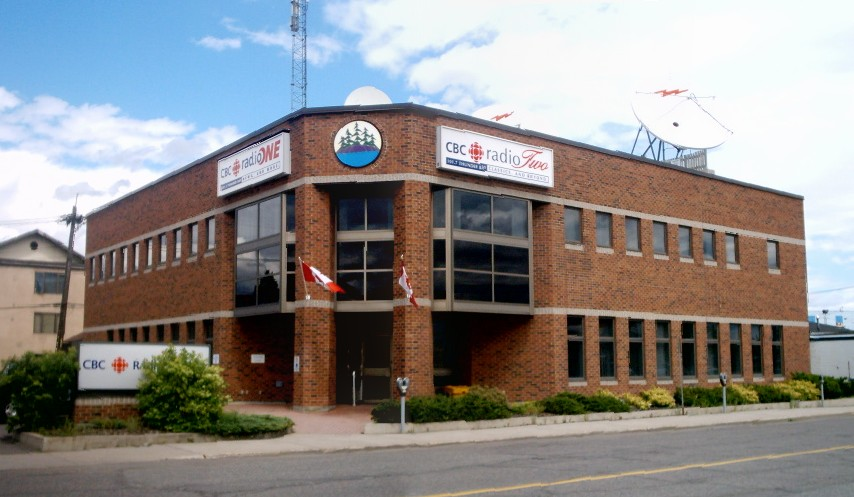
CBC Radio One's Thunder Bay studio

== Local programming ==
The station's local program is Superior Morning, hosted by Mary-Jean Cormier. The station formerly also produced Voyage North, hosted by Gerald Graham in the afternoon, although that program was replaced in August 2014 by Up North, hosted by Jessica Pope from the studios of CBCS-FM in Sudbury. The move faced some protest in the city, with Thunder Bay City Council passing a unanimous resolution requesting that the federal government rescind its 2012 funding cuts to the CBC.

CBQT's rebroadcast transmitters in the Central time zone also simulcast the 5 p.m. hour of local programming from CBW in Winnipeg so that the network's World at Six airs at 6 p.m. local time.

The CBC Radio studio in Thunder Bay also produces the hourly weekend weather reports for all of Ontario after the hourly news break.

== Repeaters ==
Rebroadcasters of CBQT-FM
City of licence	Identifier	Frequency	Power	Class	RECNet	CRTC Decision	Notes
Armstrong	CBQT-FM-2	91.3 FM	50 watts	LP	Query	2013-229	50°18′11.88″N 89°0′25.92″W
Atikokan	CBQI-FM	90.1 FM	2,900 watts	A	Query		48°46′22.08″N 91°36′38.16″W
Beardmore	CBLE	1240 AM	40 watts	LP	Query		49°35′48.84″N 87°57′33.84″W
Big Trout Lake	CFTL-FM	100.3 FM	63 watts	A1	Query		53°49′59.88″N 89°53′0.96″W; Community-owned rebroadcaster
Dryden	CBQH-FM	100.9 FM	1,300 watts	C	Query		49°47′0.96″N 92°48′25.92″W
Ear Falls	CBOI-FM	95.5 FM	50 watts	LP	Query	2018-45; 2022-115	50°38′35.88″N 93°13′33.96″W
Fort Frances	CBQQ-FM	90.5 FM	23,550 watts	B	Query		48°38′21.84″N 93°43′14.88″W
Fort Hope	CBCF-FM	101.5 FM	41 watts	A1	Query	89-764	51°33′19.08″N 87°54′10.08″W
Geraldton	CBLG-FM	89.1 FM	11,900 watts	B	Query	86-1136	49°43′46.92″N 86°43′55.92″W
Hornepayne	CBQT-FM-1	92.3 FM	50 watts	LP	Query	2013-228	49°13′59.88″N 84°46′9.84″W
Ignace	CBES	690 AM	40 watts	LP	Query		49°24′48.96″N 91°39′45″W
Kenora	CBQX-FM	98.7 FM	38,000 watts	B	Query		49°46′9.12″N 94°30′18″W
Manitouwadge	CBEB-FM	89.7 FM	46,400 watts	B	Query	87-735	49°8′16.08″N 85°50′13.92″W
Marathon	CBLM-FM	107.5 FM	2,187 watts	B	Query	2017-175	48°45′11.16″N 86°34′53.04″W
Mishkeegogamang	CBQN-FM	104.5 FM	81 watts	A1	Query		51°13′35.04″N 90°13′41.88″W
Nakina	CBLN-FM	98.1 FM	50 watts	LP	Query	2015-343	50°10′42.96″N 86°42′24.84″W
Nipigon	CBQY-FM	98.9 FM	2,000 watts	B	Query		48°58′18.12″N 88°18′24.12″W
Pickle Lake	CBQP-FM	105.1 FM	83 watts	A1	Query		51°28′41.16″N 90°11′0.96″W
Pikangikum	CBQU-FM	100.3 FM	34 watts	A1	Query		51°48′6.84″N 93°59′22.92″W
Red Lake	CBEA-FM	90.5 FM	82 watts	A1	Query		51°1′18.12″N 93°49′45.12″W
Sandy Lake	CBQV-FM	101.1 FM	37 watts	A1	Query		53°3′9″N 93°19′35.04″W
Savant Lake	CBQL-FM	104.9 FM	78 watts	A1	Query		50°14′21.84″N 90°42′42.84″W
Schreiber	CBLB-FM	90.9 FM	130 watts	A1	Query	2019-142	48°48′20.88″N 87°15′57.96″W
Sioux Lookout	CBLS-FM	95.3 FM	500 watts	A	Query	2013-190	50°4′26.04″N 92°1′28.92″W
Sioux Narrows	CBQS-FM	95.7 FM	1,300 watts	A	Query		49°25′42.96″N 94°3′45″W
White River	CBLW-FM	97.7 FM	50 watts	LP	Query	2017-74	48°34′50.16″N 85°16′50.16″W

CFTL-FM, a radio station in Big Trout Lake owned by the Ayamowin Communications Society, rebroadcasts CBQT-FM part-time, with additional programming originating from CKWT-FM Sioux Lookout. It is currently unknown if this station is still broadcasting.

=== AM to FM ===
Some of CBQT-FM's repeaters currently operate on the AM dial. Future plans are possible to convert the remaining repeaters to the FM dial.

On December 21, 2012, the CBC filed an application to the CRTC to convert the following AM transmitters to the FM dial.

- CBOL 1450 to 91.3 with 50 watts
- CBLH 1010 to 92.3 with 50 watts

The CRTC approved the applications for both transmitters on May 8, 2013.

On January 21, 2013, the CBC filed an application to the CRTC to convert CBLS 1240 to 95.3 FM with 500 watts (average & maximum ERP). Antenna height will be 182 metres (EHAAT) and the radiation pattern will be non-directional. As well this new FM transmitter will serve the nearby town of Hudson and Hudson's transmitter (CBQW 1340) was deleted as well. The conversion was approved by the CRTC on April 17, 2013.

On May 14, 2015, the CBC applied to convert CBLN 1240 to 98.1 MHz with 50 watts, antenna height 9.1 metres (EHAAT) with a non-directional antenna pattern. The CRTC approved the CBC's application on July 28, 2015.

On December 22, 2016, the CBC applied to convert CBLW 1010 to 97.7 MHz. The CRTC approved the CBC's application to move CBLW from the AM band to the FM band on March 16, 2017.

On March 2, 2017, the CBC applied to convert CBLM 1090 to 107.5 MHz. CBEH 1010 Terrace Bay was shut down.

On November 22, 2017, the CBC applied to convert CBOI 690 to 95.5 MHz. The CRTC approved the CBC's application to move CBOI to the FM band on February 5, 2018. On March 3, 2022 the CBC reapplied to the CRTC to add a new FM transmitter at Ear Falls to replace CBOI AM which was approved on May 3, 2022.

On March 8, 2019, the CBC applied to convert CBLB 1340 to 90.9 MHz. This application was approved on May 13, 2019.

CBLE 1240 Beardmore and CBES 690 Ignace are currently the only two AM transmitters left that rebroadcast CBQT-FM. These two transmitters may either be converted to the FM band or shutdown completely.
