= CFWH-FM =

CBC Radio One station in Whitehorse, Yukon, Canada

- Whitehorse, Yukon; Canada
- Broadcast area: Yukon
- Frequency: 94.5 MHz

Programming
- Format: News/Talk
- Network: CBC Radio One, CBC North

Ownership
- Owner: Canadian Broadcasting Corporation
- Sister stations: CFYK-DT

History
- First air date: February 24, 1944
- Former call signs: CFWH (1944–2012)
- Former frequencies: 1240 kHz (1944–1963); 570 kHz (1963–2012)
- Call sign meaning: Canadian Forces Whitehorse

Technical information
- Class: C1
- ERP: 6,290 watts (peak); 3,300 watts (average)
- HAAT: 420.5 metres (1,380 ft)

Links
- Webcast: CBC Whitehorse Webcast
- Website: CBC North

CFWH-FM is a Canadian radio station broadcasting at 94.5 MHz FM in Whitehorse, Yukon. The station broadcasts the programming of the CBC Radio One network known as CBC North. Until its closure in 2012, CFWH's sister television station was CFWH-TV.

== History ==
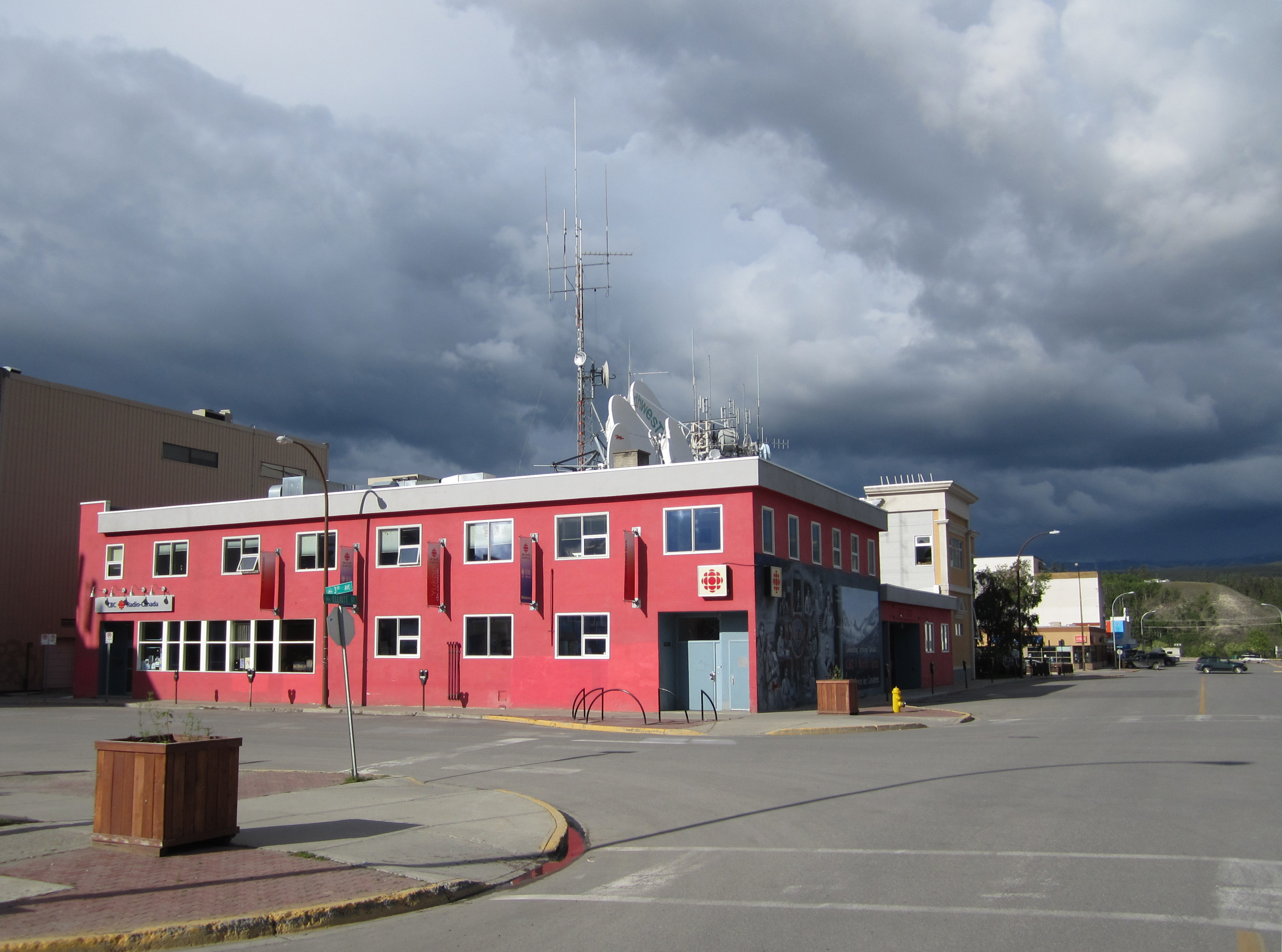
CFWH's studio in downtown Whitehorse

CFWH began broadcasting on February 24, 1944, as a radio station owned and operated by the Northwest Service Command of the United States Army Service Forces, the entity then responsible for maintenance of the Alaska Highway. The station was staffed by members of the United States Army, with programming furnished by the Special Services. By December 1945, a temporary landline connection to CJCA in Edmonton allowed for a relay of the CBC's Christmas Day programming that year.

Concurrent with the transfer of control of the Alaska Highway within Canada, on June 1, 1946, ownership of the station was transferred to the Canadian Army, Northwest Highway System. Most programming, however, continued to be supplied by the Armed Forces Radio Service, while volunteers from the Royal Canadian Air Force and the community at-large operated the station.

The Armed Forces Radio Service stopped deliveries of programming to CFWH in November 1952. Around the same time, the CBC began distributing recordings of CBC radio programming to remote radio stations within Canada, including CFWH. These recordings were made in Montreal and originally on disc, but soon transitioned to tape by April 1953. For CFWH, this meant that the station was able to obtain CBC programming on a consistent basis for the first time in its history. Initially, approximately 25 hours per week of said programming aired alongside local programming.

In 1956, the station's studios and transmitter were moved to a site at RCAF Station Whitehorse. By this time, the station was airing approximately 60 hours per week of CBC programming, most of which was about two weeks old by the time it arrived on tape in Whitehorse.

In 1958, the CBC announced the creation of a northern radio service and that the volunteer operation of CFWH would be taken over by employees of the CBC. The official transfer of control took place on November 10, 1958, with CFWH becoming the first station within the CBC's new Northern Service. As part of the takeover, a direct link—via the CN Telegraph system—to the Trans-Canada Network was established in order for CFWH to obtain CBC programming.

The CFWH studios were moved in 1959 to a facility on Third Avenue and Wood Street in downtown Whitehorse. In April 1966, the studios were moved once more, this time three blocks south to a new downtown office building on the corner of Third Avenue and Elliott Street, where they remain to this day.

In conjunction with a transmitter power increase from 250 watts to 1,000 watts, CFWH moved off of its original 1240 kHz frequency and began broadcasting at 570 kHz on October 2, 1963.

On May 21, 2009, the CBC applied to the CRTC to convert CFWH to 94.5 MHz. The station received approval on October 27, 2009. The FM frequency was launched on June 1, 2009, and the AM frequency was shut down on August 31, 2012.

On September 12, 2012, the CBC received CRTC approval to add a new FM transmitter in Whitehorse to rebroadcast CFWH-FM on 95.3 MHz, due to the area's mountainous terrain causing signal deficiencies in part of the station's broadcast area. The callsign is CFWH-FM-1.

== Local programming ==
CFWH produces all of CBC Radio's local programs in the Yukon, including Yukon Morning on weekday mornings, the noon-hour program Midday Café, Airplay in the afternoons, and The Weekender on weekend mornings.

During CBC Radio One's Saturday afternoon block for local cultural programming, CFWH broadcasts Rencontres, a French program produced by volunteers at the Association franco-yukonnaise in Whitehorse for the Franco-Yukonnais community. Although Whitehorse itself is served by a rebroadcaster of the Ici Radio-Canada Première station in Vancouver, that network does not originate any French programming in the Yukon.

== Rebroadcasters ==
CFWH has the following rebroadcasters:

Rebroadcasters of CFWH-FM
| City of licence | Identifier | Frequency | Power | Class | RECNet | CRTC Decision | Notes |
|---|---|---|---|---|---|---|---|
| Beaver Creek | CBDM | 690 AM | 40 watts | LP | Query | | 62°22′50.88″N 140°53′6″W |
| Carmacks | CBQF | 990 AM | 40 watts | LP | Query | | 62°6′1.08″N 136°15′57.60″W |
| Dawson City | CBDN | 560 AM | 400 watts | C | Query | 93-725; 2004-358 | 64°3′20.88″N 139°24′50.40″W |
| Destruction Bay | CBDL-FM | 105.1 FM | 400 watts | A | Query | 91-200 | 61°19′32.88″N 138°56′52.80″W; Also serves Burwash Landing |
| Faro | CBQK-FM | 105.1 FM | 87 watts | A1 | Query | 87-610 | 62°13′46.92″N 133°20′9.60″W |
| Haines Junction | CBDF-FM | 103.5 FM | 90 watts | A1 | Query | 92-180 | 60°46′19.92″N 137°31′1.20″W |
| Mayo | CBDC-FM | 104.9 FM | 50 watts | LP | Query | 2013-225 | 63°35′35.88″N 135°53′45.60″W |
| Ross River | CBQJ | 990 AM | 40 watts | LP | Query | | 61°58′41.16″N 132°27′28.80″W |
| Teslin | CBDK | 940 AM | 40 watts | LP | Query | | 60°10′0.84″N 132°43′40.80″W |
| Watson Lake | CBDB | 990 AM | 400 (daytime) watts 165 (nighttime) watts | C | Query | | 60°3′57.96″N 128°43′22.80″W |
| Atlin, British Columbia | CBUA-FM | 90.1 FM | 14 watts | LP | Query | 86-82 | 59°35′24″N 133°42′54″W |
| Whitehorse | CFWH-FM-1 | 95.3 FM | 50 watts | LP | Query | 2012-488 | 60°55′1.92″N 135°13′22.80″W |

CBDN was a radio station which operated from the 1940s to the 1960s as CFYT.

On December 21, 2012, the CBC filed an application to convert CBDC 1230 to 104.9 MHz. The application was approved on May 8, 2013.

The CBC used to operate low-power rebroadcasters CBDD 560 Elsa and CBDX 970 Swift River; these rebroadcasters were closed at the CBC's request by the CRTC on October 25, 2013.

== Community-owned rebroadcasters ==
The following rebroadcasters are not owned by the CBC, but by independent community groups.

Rebroadcasters of CFWH-FM
| City of licence | Identifier | Frequency | Power | Class | RECNet | CRTC Decision | Notes |
|---|---|---|---|---|---|---|---|
| Ferry Hill | VF2259 | 106.1 FM | 976 watts | B | Query | 94-85 | 63°24′50.04″N 136°40′58.80″W |
| Horse Camp Hill | VF2211 | 93.3 FM | 1045 watts | B | Query | 92-811 | 62°3′2.16″N 140°35′27.60″W |
| Pelly Crossing | VF2041 | 100.1 FM | 24 watts | LP | Query | 94-805 | 62°49′19.92″N 136°34′37.20″W |
| Mount Jubilee | CKZV-FM | 103.1 FM | 482 watts | A | Query | 2020-179 | 60°16′26.04″N 134°11′9.60″W |

On June 22, 2017, the CRTC approved the application by Noah Gehmair, in his capacity as Manager, Technology Infrastructure, Government of Yukon. The RDU will rebroadcast the signal of CFWH to the community of Mount Jubilee in order to provide Radio One programming to that community. The undertaking will distribute the programming service of CFWH at 103.1 MHz with an average effective radiated power (ERP) of 340 watts (maximum ERP of 482 watts with an effective height of antenna above average terrain of 271.45 metres). Manager, Technology Infrastructure, Government of Yukon reapplied to operate an FM transmitter at 103.1 MHz in Mount Jubilee on November 13, 2019. The proposed stations' call sign will be CKZV. This application to add an FM transmitter at Mount Jubilee was approved on June 3, 2020.
