= CBTK-FM =

Radio station in Kelowna

- Kelowna, British Columbia; Canada
- Broadcast area: Southern Interior
- Frequency: 88.9 MHz
- Branding: CBC Radio One

Programming
- Format: News/Talk

Ownership
- Owner: Canadian Broadcasting Corporation

History
- First air date: November 1987
- Call sign meaning: Canadian Broadcasting Corporation T Kelowna

Technical information
- Class: C
- ERP: 5.2 kW
- HAAT: 507.8 metres (1,666 ft)
- Transmitter coordinates: 49°58′0″N 119°31′44″W

Links
- Webcast: CBC Kelowna webcast
- Website: CBC British Columbia

CBTK-FM is a Canadian radio station, which broadcasts the programming of the CBC Radio One network in Kelowna, British Columbia. The station broadcasts at 88.9 FM in Kelowna.

== History ==
The station was launched in 1987. Prior to its launch, CBC Radio programming aired in Kelowna on private affiliate CKOV 630 in the AM band, while most of its other transmitters were rebroadcasters of Vancouver's CBU.

== Local programming ==
CBTK produces its own local morning show, Daybreak South with Chris Walker, as well as a local afternoon show, Radio West with Sarah Penton, which airs across the whole interior of British Columbia.

== Rebroadcasters ==
Rebroadcasters of CBTK-FM
City of licence	Identifier	Frequency	Power	Class	RECNet	CRTC Decision	Notes
Trail	CBTA-FM	94.9 FM	13,500 watts	C	Query	85-659	49°5′33″N 117°49′16″W
Crawford Bay	CBTE-FM	89.9 FM	135 watts	A1	Query	84-797	49°38′54″N 116°50′57″W
Kaslo	CBUG	860 AM	40 watts	LP	Query		49°54′29″N 116°53′59″W
Fernie	CBTN-FM	97.7 FM	323 watts	A	Query		49°29′18″N 115°03′51″W
Sparwood	CBYS-FM	105.7 FM	978 watts	A	Query		49°42′40″N 114°52′46″W
Penticton	CBTP-FM	93.7 FM	1,840 watts	B	Query	85-538	49°31′44″N 119°38′29″W
Osoyoos	CBUB-FM	95.3 FM	512 watts	A	Query		49°6′6″N 119°34′42″W
Creston	CBTS-FM	100.3 FM	140 watts	B	Query	86-723	49°9′56″N 116°40′43″W
Keremeos	CBKY	1350 AM	40 watts	LP	Query		49°12′17″N 119°49′7″W
Field	CBTK-FM-1	97.1 FM	9 watts	LP	Query	2011-775	51°22′41″N 116°27′49″W
Princeton	CBRG-FM	93.1 FM	188 watts	A1	Query	88-766	49°28′10″N 120°32′58″W
Grand Forks	CBTK-FM-2	107.3 FM	252 watts	A	Query		49°1′40″N 118°26′44″W
Phoenix	CBRJ-FM	97.9 FM	618 watts	B	Query	89-760	49°5′29″N 118°36′40″W
Kimberley	CBRK	900 AM	40 watts	LP	Query		49°40′49″N 115°58′35″W
Christina Lake	CBRO-FM	88.5 FM	670 watts	A	Query	89-758	49°0′28″N 118°11′1″W
Salmon Arm	CBUC-FM	96.9 FM	112 watts	B	Query	88-855	50°45′31″N 119°21′57″W
Bonnington Falls	CBUD-FM	89.5 FM	215 watts	A1	Query		49°28′33″N 117°29′20″W
New Denver	CBTK-FM-3	102.5 FM	50 watts	LP	Query		49°59′40″N 117°21′59″W
Winlaw	CBUJ-FM	91.7 FM	474 watts	B	Query	88-856	49°33′24″N 117°35′45″W
Nakusp	CBUM-FM	99.9 FM	50 watts	LP	Query	2017-407; 2019-324	Originally on 900 AM, then 91.3 FM 50°14′28″N 117°48′4″W
Salmo	CBUN	740 AM	40 watts	LP	Query		49°11′37″N 117°16′40″W
Radium Hot Springs	CBUQ-FM	94.5 FM	206 watts	A1	Query	88-767	50°37′8″N 116°4′51″W
Golden	CBXE-FM	101.7 FM	130 watts	A1	Query		51°16′25″N 116°59′21″W
Canal Flats	CBYC-FM	91.7 FM	383 watts	A	Query		50°11′41″N 115°49′29″W
Cranbrook	CBRR-FM	101.3 FM	700 watts	C	Query		49°27′30″N 115°37′49″W
Nelson	CBYN-FM	98.7 FM	1,216 watts	B	Query		49°31′50″N 117°18′2″W
Rock Creek	CBYR-FM	94.1 FM	40 watts	A1	Query		49°2′28″N 118°59′32″W
Vernon	CBYV-FM	106.5 FM	1,900 watts	A	Query		50°13′27″N 119°18′12″W
Lumby	CBYL-FM	96.7 FM	135 watts	A1	Query		50°12′35″N 118°57′29″W
Enderby	CBYX-FM	92.7 FM	135 watts	A1	Query		50°33′46″N 119°6′15″W
Revelstoke	CBTO-FM	91.3 FM	178 watts	A1	Query		50°58′41″N 118°13′19″W
Braeloch	CBTK-FM-4	106.9 FM	419 watts	A1	Query	2018-84	49°46′47″N 119°30′22″W

On April 12, 1985, the CRTC approved an application by the CBC to amend the broadcasting licences for CBXH, CBDA and CBKI by changing the frequencies from 1450 to 1540; 1240 to 1560; and 1450 to 1350. These AM transmitters were eventually converted to FM or shutdown.

=== FM conversions and transmitter closures ===
- On October 13, 2011, CBTK applied to convert CBRD 860 to 97.1 MHz. The application was approved on December 15, 2011. CBRD's callsign was replaced by CBTK-FM-1 once the flip occurred.
- On August 16, 2013, CBTK-FM applied to relocate CBRJ 860 to 107.3 MHz. This application was approved on October 31, 2013.
- On October 25, 2013, at the request of the CBC, the CRTC deleted low-power AM transmitter CBKR 740 in Parson. Also, another low-power AM transmitter CBWD 900 in Donald was deleted. Radio One programming in these communities are available from adjacent transmitters CBUQ-FM and CBXE-FM, the closest Radio One transmitters to Parson and Donald.
- On September 23, 2014, the CBC was approved to convert CBUI 740 to 102.5 MHz.
- On September 1, 2017, the CBC applied to convert CBUM 900 to 91.3 MHz. The CRTC approved the CBC's application to convert CBUM to 91.3 FM on November 17, 2017. This was later changed to 99.9 MHz after the CRTC approved the CBC's application to move CBUM-FM to 99.9 MHz on September 18, 2019.

=== Split of CBYK-FM into separate network ===
CBTK-FM was previously repeated on CBYK-FM Kamloops and on 22 CBC radio repeaters in the Thompson and Cariboo regions. On October 28, 2011, the CBC filed an application with the CRTC to convert CBYK-FM to an anchor of a new regional CBC Radio One network. The CRTC approved the new regional network on March 30, 2012, with a start-up date slated for October 9, 2012.

CBUC-FM, which was originally to have been part of the new network, will remain a repeater of CBTK-FM, following interventions from various parties, including the City of Salmon Arm, that the region is more economically tied with the Okanagan region than with Kamloops.

Shortly after CBYK-FM's launch as a separate station, residents of Revelstoke complained to the CRTC that they were not consulted by the CBC when they switched their local repeater, CBTO-FM 91.3, to CBYK-FM's programming; e-mails made to the city's mayor's office show that 80% of listeners prefer programming from Kelowna, while only 20% prefer the new Kamloops programming. The CRTC later said that it is up to the CBC to decide which programming originates for CBTO-FM, not the CRTC. After city officials contacted the CBC, BC spokesperson Lorna Haeber said that the CBC would make a decision on the issue "shortly", but failed to elaborate how or when the decision will be made. The CRTC subsequently issued a notice that it had approved an application by the CBC to change the local programming source of its Radio One transmitter in Revelstoke from Kamloops back to Kelowna. The change was implemented on January 2, 2014.
