= CFYK-FM =

Radio station in Northwest Territories, Canada

- Yellowknife, Northwest Territories; Canada
- Broadcast area: District of Mackenzie
- Frequency: 98.9 MHz

Programming
- Format: News/Talk
- Network: CBC Radio One; CBC North

Ownership
- Owner: Canadian Broadcasting Corporation
- Sister stations: CFYK-DT

History
- First air date: January 15, 1950
- Former call signs: CFYK (1950–2013)
- Former frequencies: 1450 kHz (1950–1952); 1340 kHz (1952–2013)
- Call sign meaning: "Canadian Forces Yellowknife"

Technical information
- Licensing authority: CRTC
- Class: A
- ERP: 5,500 watts
- HAAT: 50 metres (160 ft)
- Transmitter coordinates: 62°26′47″N 114°23′20″W

Links
- Website: cbc.ca/north

CFYK-FM is a radio station broadcasting at 98.9 FM in Yellowknife, Northwest Territories, Canada. The station is owned by the Canadian Broadcasting Corporation and broadcasts national programming of the CBC Radio One network along with regional programs as part of CBC North.

== History ==
CFYK began broadcasting on January 15, 1950. Like other radio stations in Northern Canada at the time, CFYK was licensed to the Canadian Army's Royal Canadian Corps of Signals and utilized the technical infrastructure of the Northwest Territories and Yukon Radio System, but was managed by a civilian committee and operated by volunteers as a commercial-free community radio station.

Initially, programming consisted entirely of local content created by residents of Yellowknife, including schoolchildren and anybody who wished to be heard on the radio. By 1952, the CBC began to regularly supply the station with tape recordings of CBC programming for broadcast alongside the local content.

In 1958, the CBC announced it would create a new radio network (now known as CBC North) to target Northern Canada. To establish the service, the corporation would take over the operations of existing volunteer-run radio stations, turning them into CBC-owned outlets staffed by CBC employees. As part of this process, ownership of CFYK was formally transferred to the CBC on December 13, 1958.

Upon sign-on, CFYK was an AM station operating on a frequency of 1450 kHz with 250 watts of power. In 1952, the frequency was changed to 1340 kHz in order to alleviate interference to air search and rescue operations near Yellowknife. The station continued to operate at a power of 250 watts until 1965, when the power was increased to 1,000 watts. Subsequent power increases occurred in the 1980s, with the station receiving approval to operate at 2,500 watts during the day and 4,000 watts at night, although the increased power at night was discontinued in 1992 and the station went to operating at 2,500 watts around the clock.

On July 10, 2012, the CBC applied to move CFYK to FM on a frequency of 98.9 MHz with an effective radiated power of 1,220 watts from an antenna height above average terrain of 46.6 metres (153 ft). The move was approved on November 7, 2012. The switch from AM to FM took place on June 3, 2013, at which time the station became CFYK-FM, a call sign originally used by a relay transmitter of CBU-FM that has since been renamed CBNY-FM.

On November 28, 2013, the CBC received approval to increase CFYK-FM's effective radiated power to 5,500 watts and raise the antenna height above average terrain to 50 metres (160 ft).

== Local programming ==
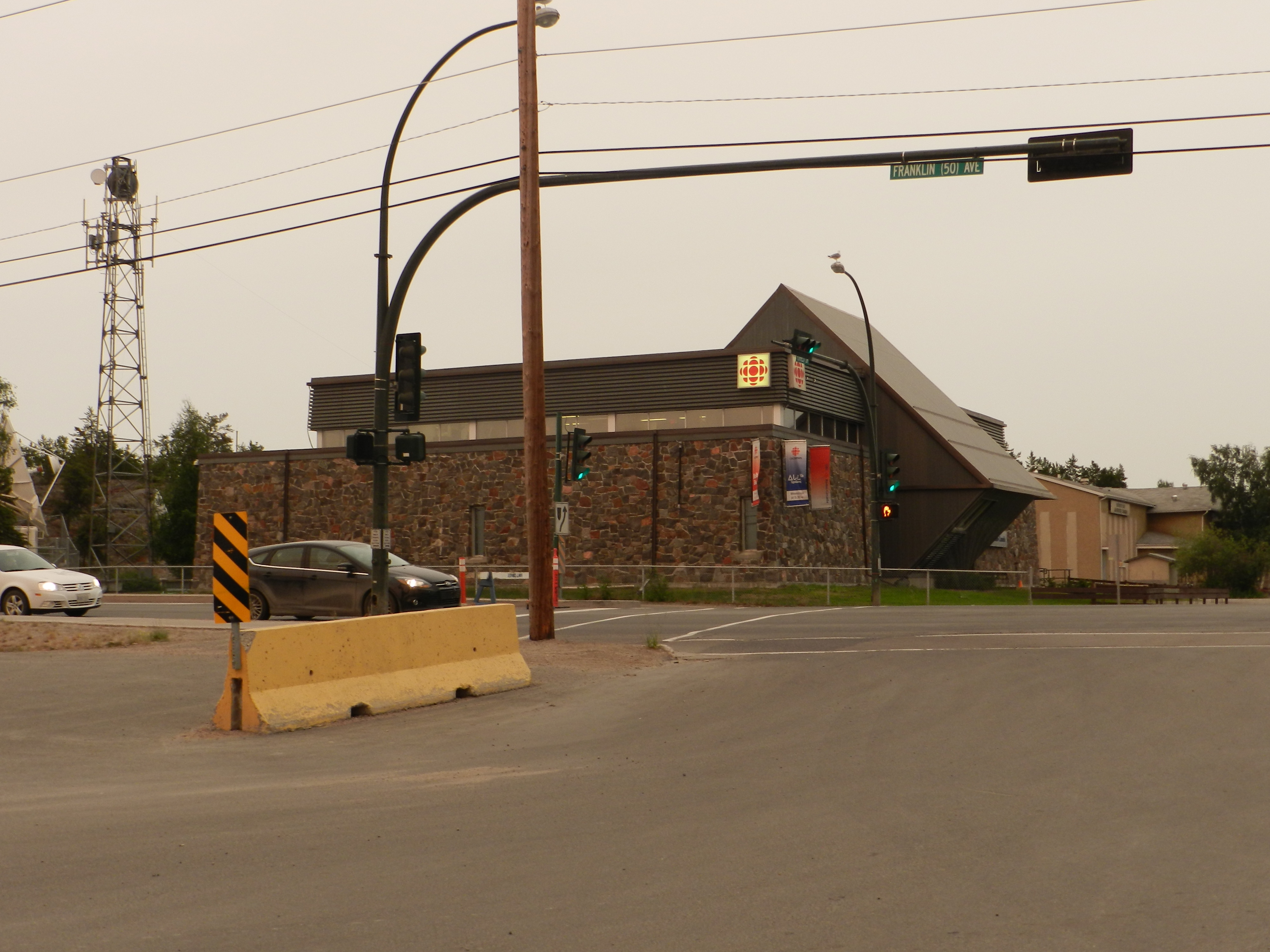
CBC station in Yellowknife

CFYK produces all of CBC Radio's local programs in the Northwest Territories, including The Trailbreaker on weekday mornings, the noon-hour program Northwind, Trail's End in the afternoon, and Northern Air on weekend mornings.

The station's afternoon programming also differs significantly from the rest of the network. Afternoon programming such as Q is pre-empted; instead, the station airs afternoon programming in First Nations languages. CHAK in Inuvik, while airing the same regular local programming schedule as CFYK, produces a distinct schedule of First Nations programming in the afternoons.

== Rebroadcasters ==
CFYK has the following rebroadcasters:

Rebroadcasters of CFYK-FM
City of licence	Identifier	Frequency	RECNet	CRTC Decision	Notes
Fort Simpson	CBDY-FM	107.5 FM	Query	2013-552	61°52′21″N 121°22′51.60″W
Fort Smith	CFYK-FM-1	97.9 FM	Query		60°0′11.16″N 111°52′33.60″W
Hay River	CBDJ-FM	93.7 FM	Query	88-20	60°51′51.84″N 115°46′4.80″W
Fort Chipewyan, Alberta	CBQZ-FM	99.9 FM	Query	2013-342	58°43′14.88″N 111°9′18″W
Behchokǫ̀	CBQB-FM	105.1 FM	Query		62°46′1.92″N 116°3′25.20″W
Fort Providence	CBAU-FM	98.9 FM	Query		61°20′53.88″N 117°38′20.40″W
Fort Resolution	CBQD-FM	105.1 FM	Query	94-804	61°10′1.92″N 113°40′30″W
Wrigley	CBQG	1280 AM	Query		63°13′1.92″N 123°26′24″W
Deline	CBQO-FM	105.1 FM	Query	94-167, 2001-369	65°11′43.08″N 123°26′13.20″W

=== Relocations to FM ===
The CBC applied with the CRTC to convert the following AM transmitters to FM:

- On April 19, 2013, applied to convert CBQC 1230 to 98.9 MHz. The application was approved on September 19, 2013.
- On May 29, 2013, applied to convert CBDO 690 to 107.5 MHz. This application was approved on October 16, 2013.
- On January 16, 2017, applied to convert CBDI 860 to 97.9 MHz. The CRTC approved the application on March 17, 2017. The callsign was then changed to CFYK-FM-1.

CBQG is the last remaining low-power AM transmitter to rebroadcast CFYK-FM.

=== Community-owned rebroadcasters ===
Rebroadcasters of CFYK-FM
City of licence	Identifier	Frequency	RECNet	CRTC Decision	Notes
Kakisa	VF2021	107.1 FM	Query	86-501	60°58′27.84″N 117°24′50.40″W

== See also ==
- CFYK-DT
