= Nominal power =

Output of a mediumwave radio station

Nominal power is a power capacity in engineering.

== Radio broadcasting ==
Nominal power is a measurement of a mediumwave radio station's output used in the United States.

== Photovoltaic devices ==
Nominal power is the nameplate capacity of photovoltaic (PV) devices, such as solar cells, panels and systems, and is determined by measuring the electric current and voltage in a circuit, while varying the resistance under precisely defined conditions.

== See also ==
- Electric power
- Engine power
- Mechanical power (physics)
- Power rating
- Real versus nominal value
- Sound power
- Steam engine
