= CBC Vancouver =

CBC Vancouver refers to:

- CBU (AM), CBU-2-FM and CKZU, CBC Radio One on 690 AM, 88.1 FM and 6160 kHz
- CBU-FM, CBC Radio 2 on 105.7 FM
- CBUT-DT, CBC Television on channel 2

SRC Vancouver refers to:

- CBUF-FM, Première Chaîne on 97.7 FM
- CBUX-FM, Espace Musique on 90.9 FM
- CBUFT-DT, Ici Radio-Canada Télé on channel 26

See also:

- CBC Regional Broadcast Centre Vancouver
