= Tim Jones (search and rescue) =

Canadian paramedic (1956–2014)

Timothy Edmund Jones OBC (May 30, 1956 – January 19, 2014) was a Canadian Advanced Life Support Paramedic and Search and Rescue Technician. Jones was also a prominent media spokesperson and team leader for North Shore Rescue which is based in North Vancouver, British Columbia, Canada. He made significant contributions to the field of Search and Rescue and was an outspoken advocate for wilderness safety.

== Early life ==
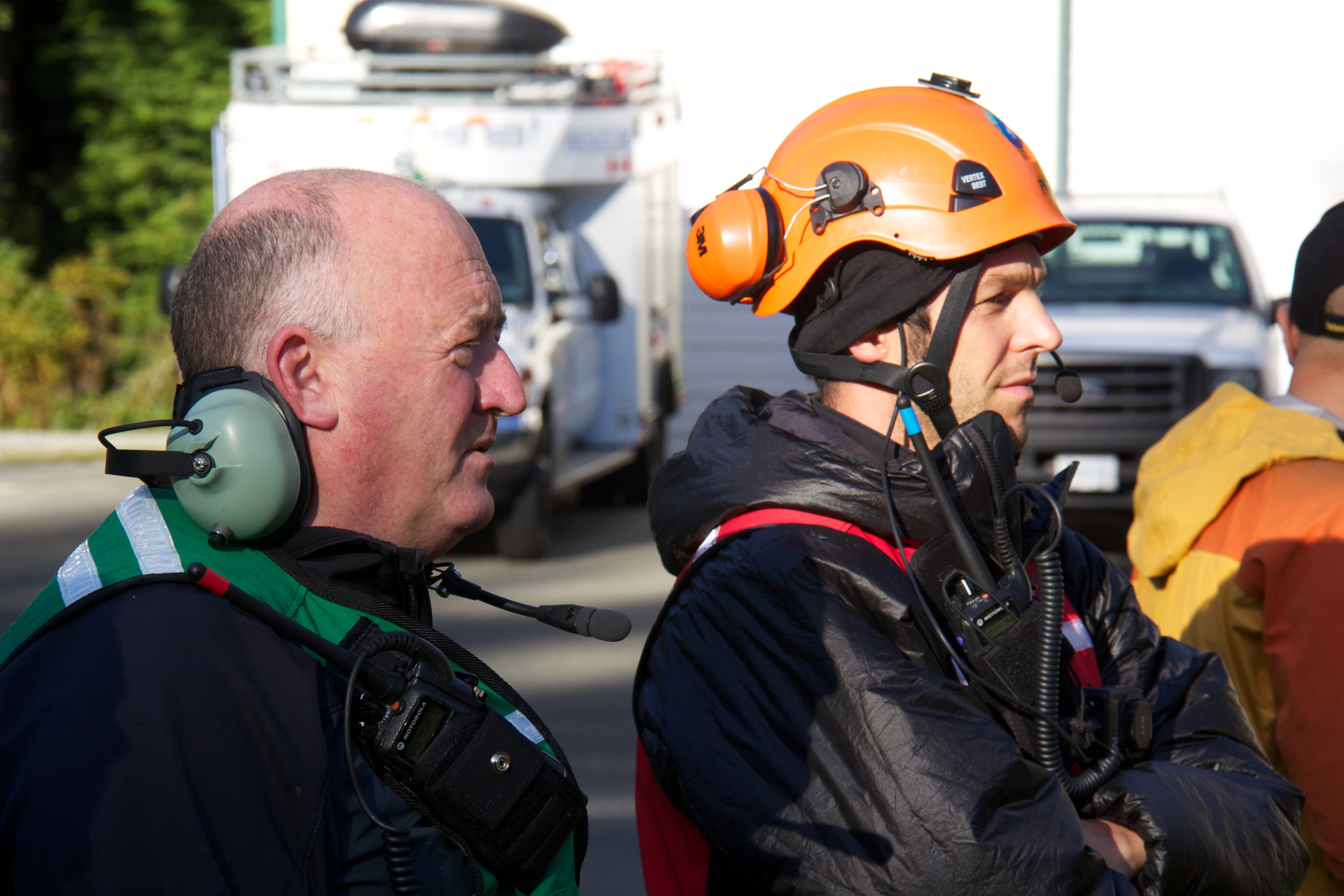
Jones supervises helicopter rescue training

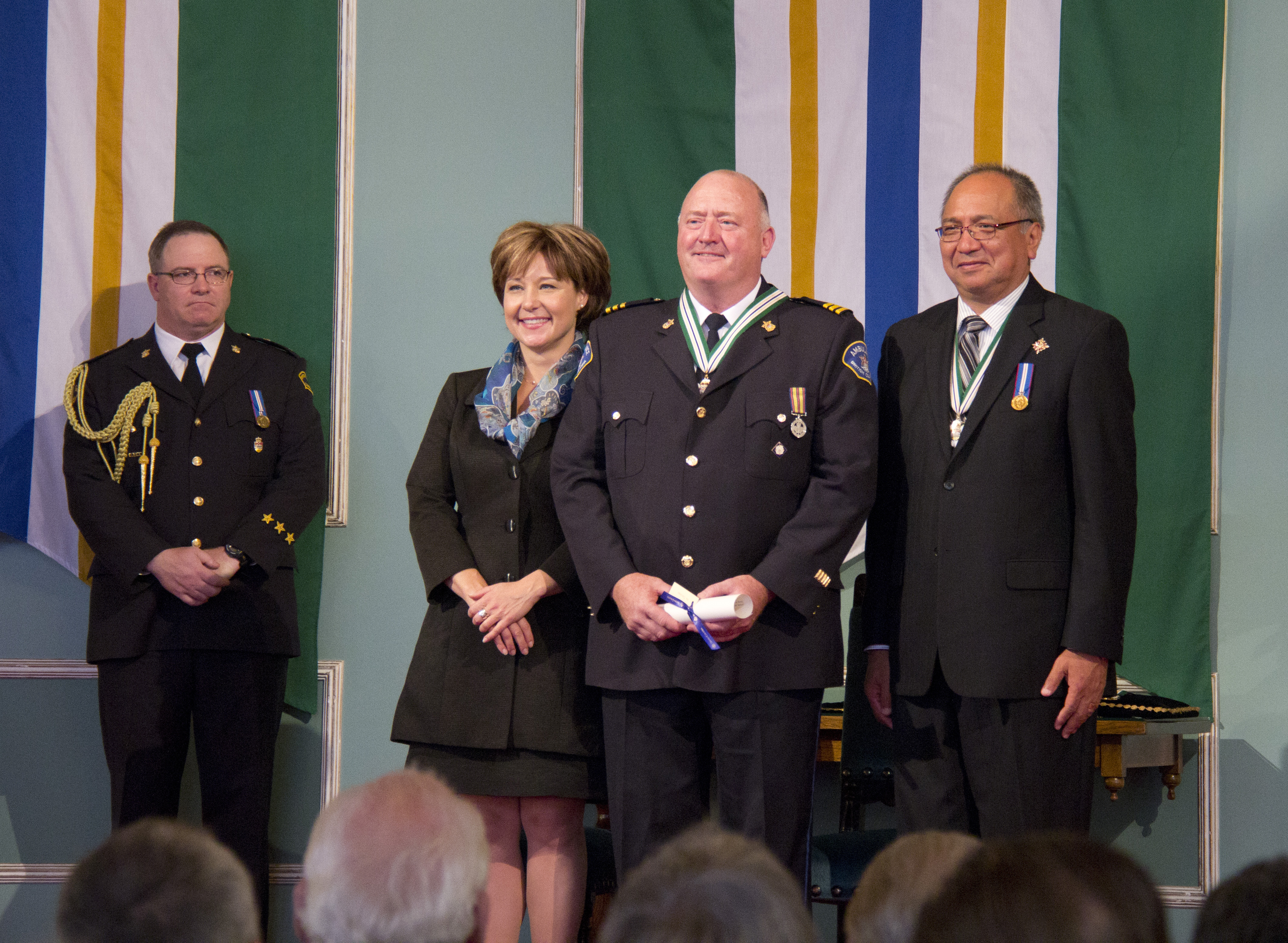
Order of BC

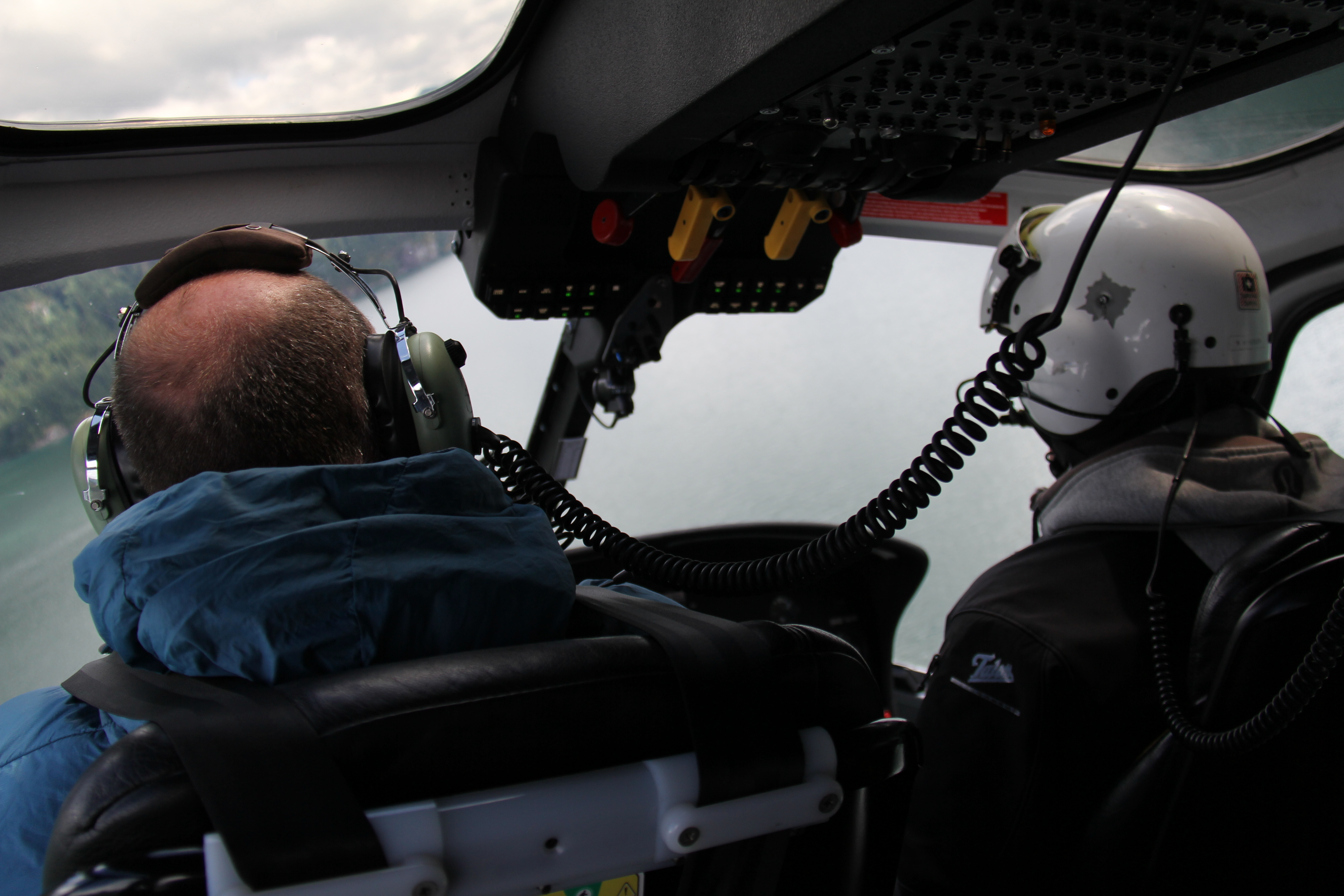
Directing SAR operations

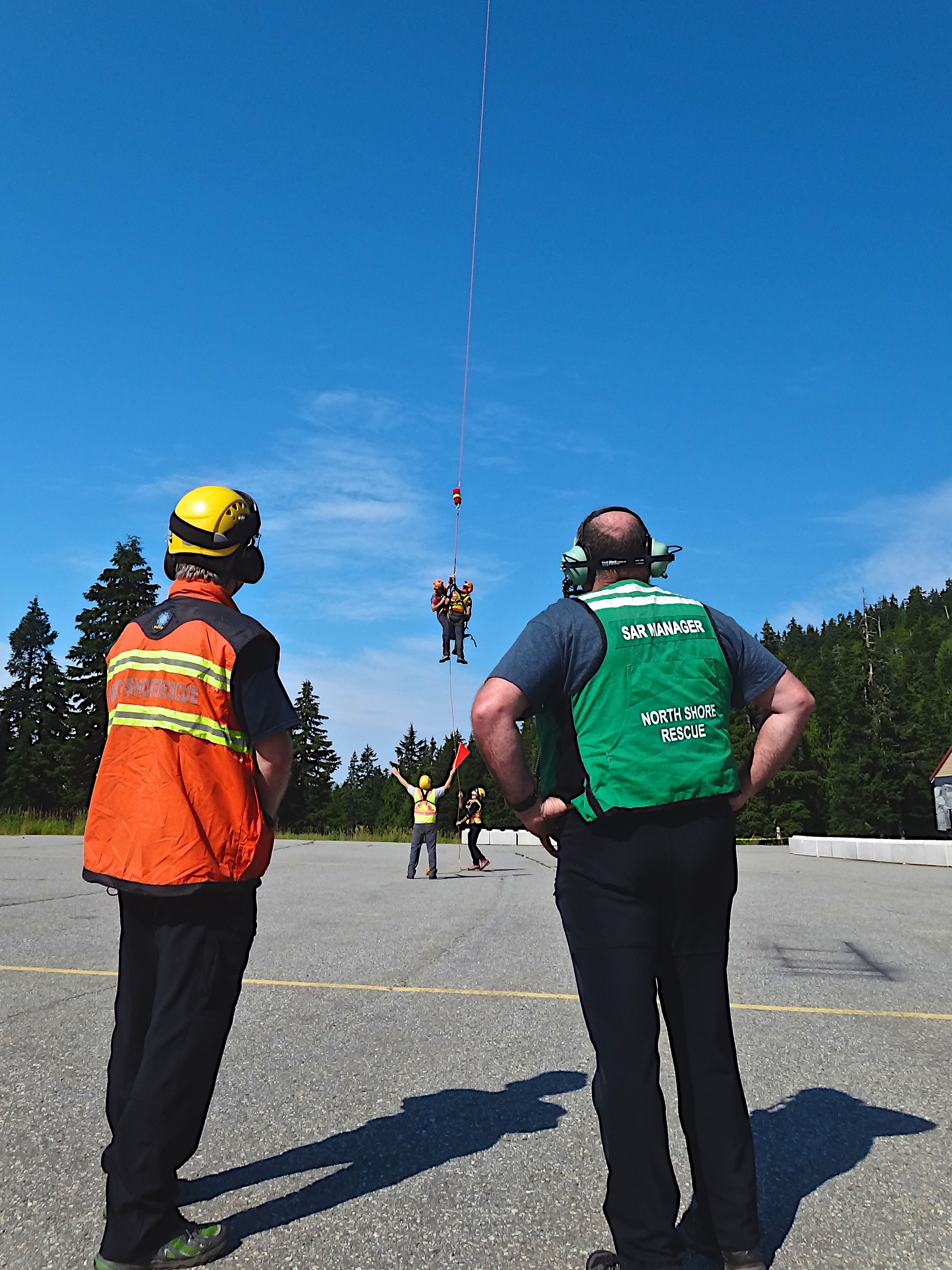
Helicopter rescue supervision

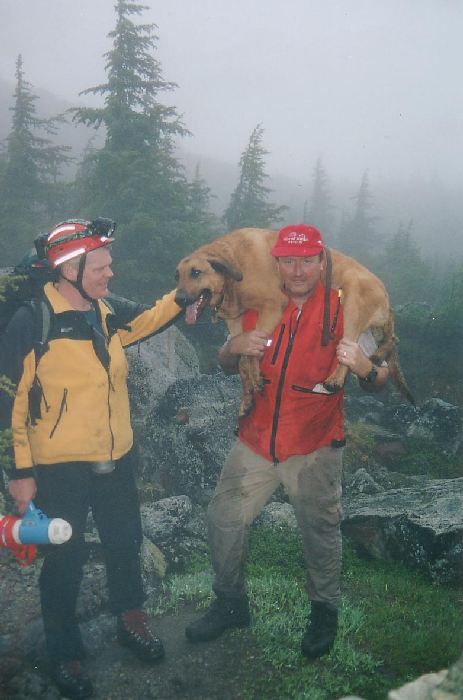
Dog rescue

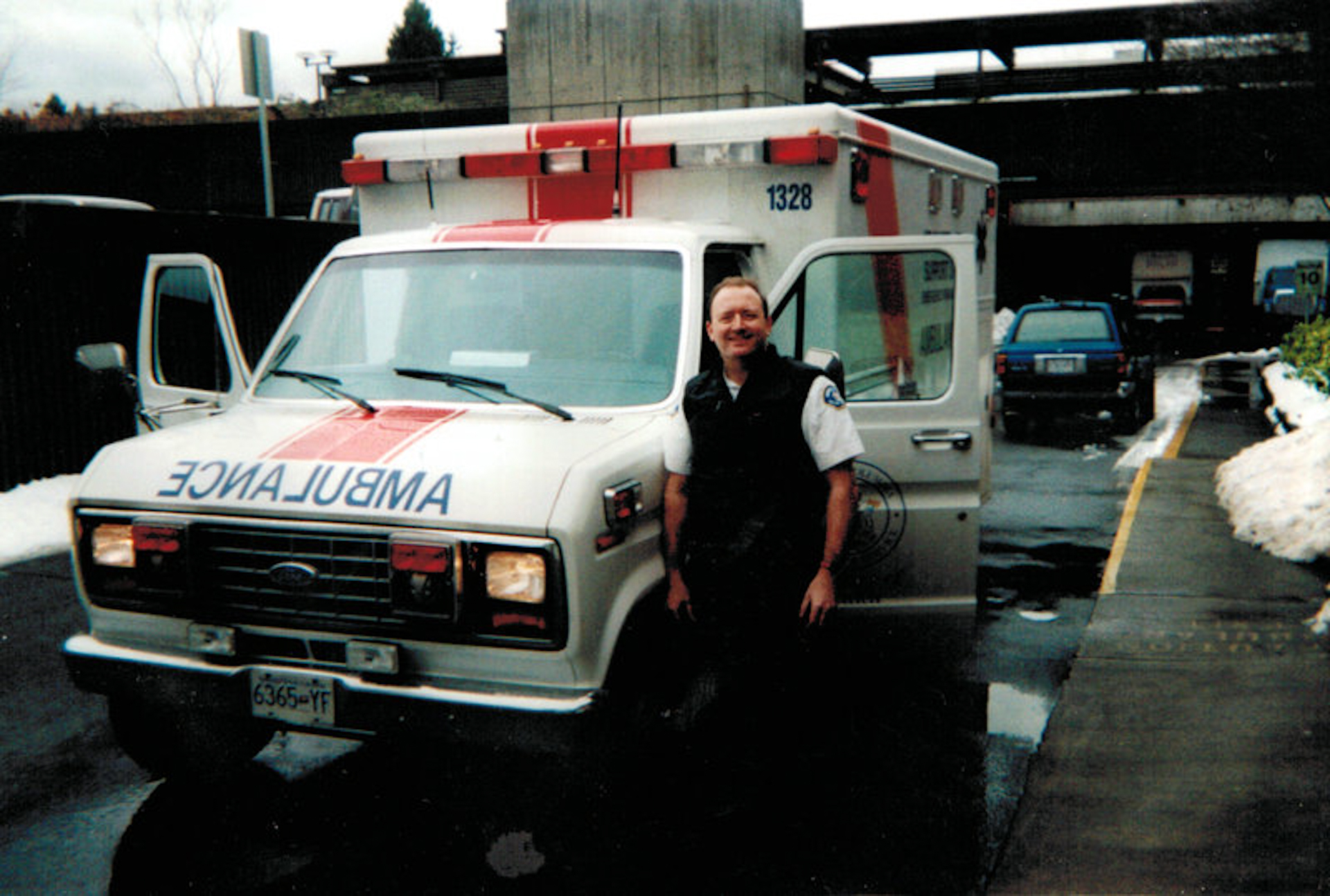
Jones and his ambulance

Timothy Edmund Jones was born on May 30, 1956, in Edmonton, Alberta, the youngest of three children. His father, Owen, was an attorney and his mother, Mary, a homemaker. The family moved to North Vancouver in 1962, settling in a home at the bottom of Grouse Mountain. There Jones explored logging trails, canyons and creeks with his brother, Owen Jr. This was the start of his love of the mountains that inspired him in his later years.

In high school, Jones played football at Handsworth Secondary School in North Vancouver and eventually went to Simon Fraser University on a sports scholarship. After graduating with a BA in geography, he was drafted into the Canadian Football League by the Toronto Argonauts in 1978, but a knee injury in preseason ended his professional football career. At 24, Jones returned to Vancouver. Shortly after returning his father died and he stayed home with his mother to offer support. Jones went on to earn a teaching degree at SFU. He became a substitute physical education and geography teacher in North Vancouver, and helped coach high school football teams.

In 1981, Jones met his wife to be, Lindsay, while on a ski trip to Mount Baker. In 1984 they were married. Their son Curtis was born in 1986, followed by their daughter Taylor in 1989. The Jones family resided in North Vancouver, British Columbia. His son, Curtis, became a member of the North Shore rescue team in 2004.

== Paramedic ==
Shortly after becoming a substitute teacher, Jones started working part-time with the British Columbia Ambulance Service. Since part-timers were required to be on-call, he sometimes spent nights sleeping at the station so he would not be late for a call. Jones progressed to working full-time as a paramedic in the Downtown Eastside. While raising a young family and working night shifts, Jones completed several advanced training certifications. He became an advanced life-support paramedic and, in 1990, was appointed unit chief in North Vancouver where he remained until his death in 2014.

== North Shore Rescue ==
Jones started with the all volunteer North Shore Rescue team as a resource member in the early 1990s, assisting the team in his role as an advanced life support paramedic. Once he became a member of the team, he recognized the need for a professional and well equipped service on the north shore and across the province and started to fundraise and advocate for the change. In his efforts building the search and rescue team, Jones would often work 50 hours a week in addition to his paid job as a paramedic.

Through his work as a search and rescue team member, Jones saved over 1600 lives in his decades of service. Additionally, he was instrumental in North Shore Rescue becoming the first British Columbia search and rescue team to implement the Helicopter Flight Rescue System also known as HETS. He was also involved with building a communications system, fundraising for several rescue vehicles and a rescue base.

Through his work with the media, Jones advocated for search and rescue volunteers across the province. Jones lobbied government for adequate funding and recognition of its volunteers. In 2014 the federal government of Canada recognized Jones in the budget by dedicating a national search and rescue volunteer tax credit in his name.

== Awards ==
Jones received numerous awards and honours for his service to the community, among them were:

- Inducted into the 2014 Simon Fraser University Clan Sports Hall of Fame under the Terry Fox Honorary Category. He is the only person other than Fox himself to so recognized.
- Federal Tax Credit for search and rescue volunteers in Canada named in his honour
- The Order of British Columbia
- Honorary Doctor of Laws from Capilano University
- The Queens Diamond Jubilee Medal

== Death ==
On January 19, 2014, Jones died from a sudden cardiac arrest while hiking down from the North Shore Rescue team cabin on Mount Seymour. He was accompanied by his daughter and a teammate who both attempted to resuscitate him.

Thousands of emergency services personnel and members of the community attended a parade and ceremony held in his honour. Both the Premier of British Columbia and the Prime Minister sent condolences which were read at the ceremony. At the end of the ceremony his ashes were taken away by the helicopter that he flew on many rescue missions.

Following his death, members of the community suggested naming the second peak of Seymour after Jones. The BC government officially named the place Tim Jones Peak in 2017.
