= CBUX =

CBUX may refer to:

- CBUX (AM), a radio rebroadcaster (1170 AM) licensed to Port Alice, British Columbia, Canada, rebroadcasting CBCV-FM
- CBUX-FM, a radio station (90.9 FM) licensed to Vancouver, British Columbia, Canada
