= Gloria Macarenko =

Canadian journalist

Gloria Macarenko CM
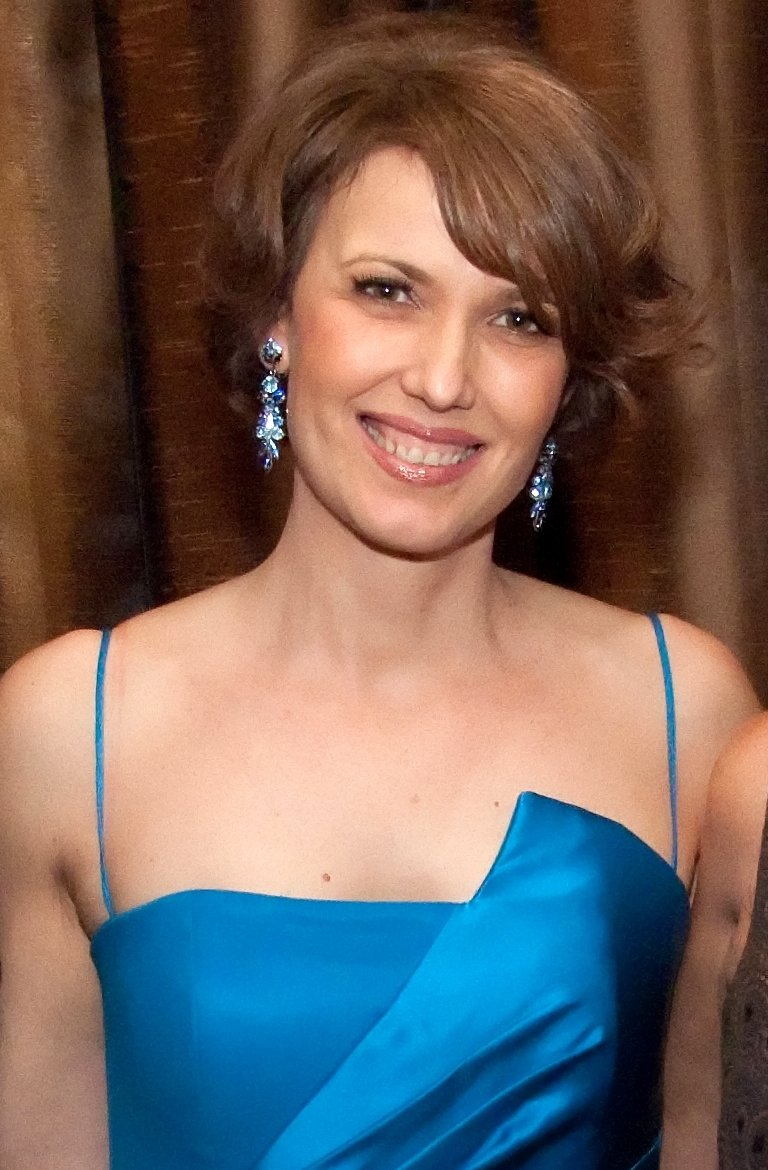
- Gloria Macarenko in 2009
- Occupations: radio and television journalist
- Years active: 1980s-present
- Known for: Canada Now, The Story from Here, CBC News: Vancouver, B.C. Almanac

Gloria Macarenko, CM is a Canadian television and radio journalist. From 1989 until 2014, she was the longtime host or co-host of CBC Vancouver's supper-hour television newscast at 5:00 or 6:00. She later hosted the CBC Radio One local program B.C. Almanac and the national CBC Radio One documentary series The Story from Here. In January 2018 she took over as the host of On The Coast, CBC Radio One's daily afternoon program in the Vancouver area. Macarenko has been a guest anchor on The National and CBC News Now on CBC News Network.

== Early life and career ==
Macarenko was raised in Prince Rupert, British Columbia and graduated from Prince Rupert Secondary School. Her first broadcasting job was reading the news after school on weekdays and weekend mornings for CHTK Radio, Prince Rupert. She studied journalism at the British Columbia Institute of Technology (BCIT). On graduating from BCIT, Macarenko worked for two years as a beat reporter for CKWX Radio in Vancouver. In her first two years in radio she interviewed then-Prime Minister Pierre Trudeau and covered the trial of serial killer Clifford Olson. Following the Olson trial, she spent four years in Spain and France, studying languages and art history and teaching English. She returned to Canada in 1989 and was hired by CBC TV in Vancouver.

== Awards and honours ==
As a journalist with twenty years of experience, she has been nominated for, and won, many awards including a Jack Webster Award for Best News Reporting in 2002, a Leo Award for Best Anchor in a News Program in 2004 (shared with Ian Hanomansing). She has been nominated twice for the Gemini Awards for "Best News Anchor" in Canada. On September 2, 1998, while acting as anchor on The National, Macarenko first reported news of the crash of SwissAir Flight 111 near Peggys Cove, Nova Scotia. Her five-hour marathon broadcast of this event earned her the Radio and Television Directors' Association (RTNDA) and Gemini awards for "Best Live News Coverage." She also hosted the RTNDA award-winning "News Day in BC" student journalism special.

She was appointed as a member of the Order of Canada in December 2018.

== Personal life ==
Macarenko serves the Vancouver community as a volunteer and host for organizations such as Arts Umbrella, Dr. Peter Centre, Royal Columbian Hospital Foundation and Westcoast LEAF. In 2005 she was named one of TVWeek's 10 Most Beautiful People in B.C. She was "Miss PNE" in 1978.
