= CBUT-DT =

Television station in Vancouver, Canada

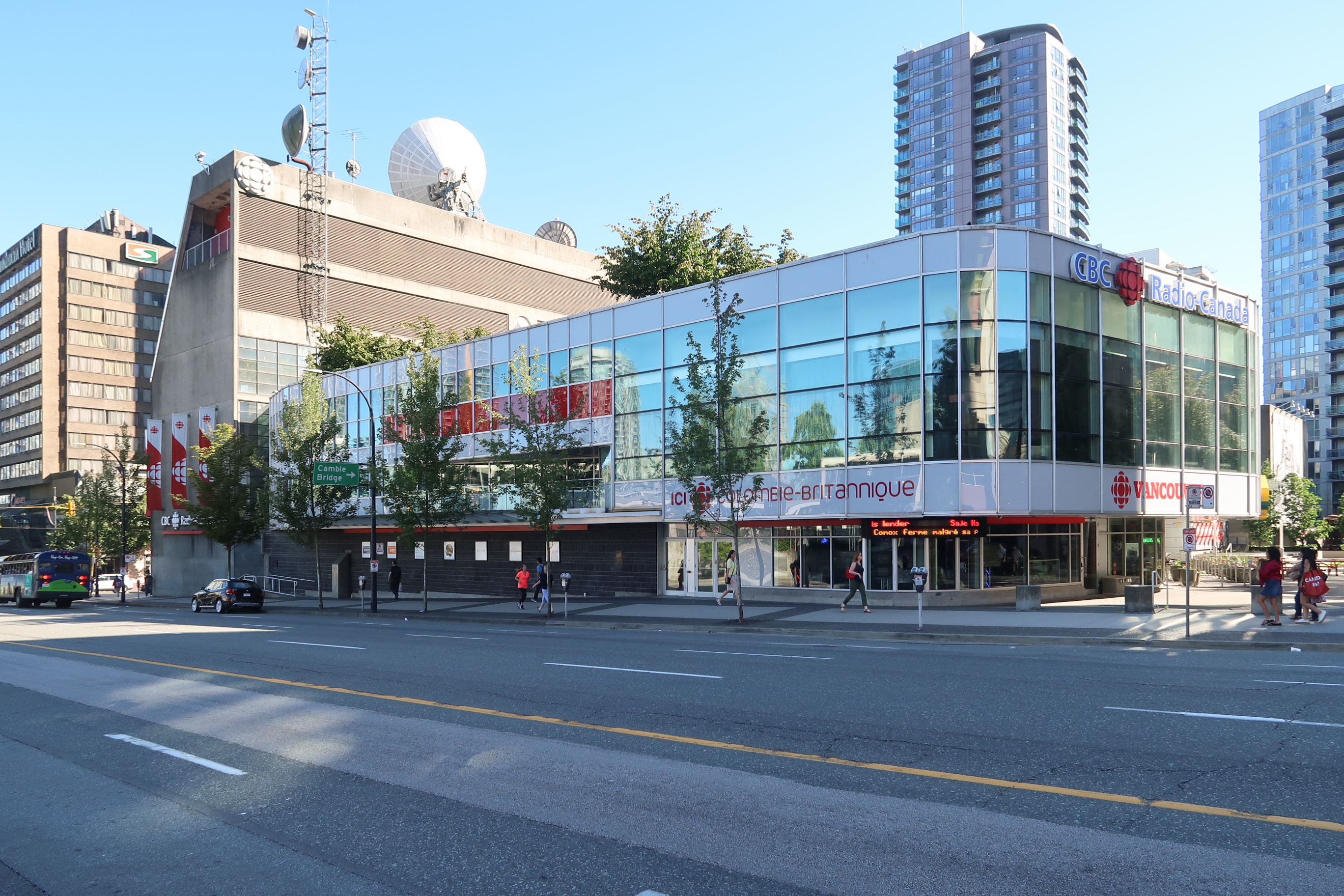
- CBC Vancouver's studios at the CBC Regional Broadcast Centre in downtown Vancouver.
- Vancouver, British Columbia; Canada
- Channels: Digital: 35 (UHF); Virtual: 2
- Branding: CBC Vancouver

Programming
- Affiliations: 2.1: CBC Television

Ownership
- Owner: Canadian Broadcasting Corporation
- Sister stations: TV: CBUFT-DT; Radio: CBU (AM), CBU-FM, CBUF-FM, CBUX-FM

History
- First air date: December 16, 1953
- Former call signs: CBUT (1953–2011)
- Former channel numbers: Analog: 2 (VHF, 1953–2011); Digital: 58 (UHF, 2006–2011), 43 (UHF, 2011–2020)
- Former affiliations: Radio-Canada (secondary, 1964–1976)
- Call sign meaning: CBC Vancouver Television; -or-; Bute Street (the original street at which CBUT was headquartered)

Technical information
- Licensing authority: CRTC
- ERP: 88.5 kW
- HAAT: 622.1 m (2,041 ft)
- Transmitter coordinates: 49°21′13″N 122°57′23″W

Links
- Website: www.cbc.ca/news/canada/british-columbia

CBUT-DT (channel 2, cable channel 3) is a television station in Vancouver, British Columbia, Canada, serving as the West Coast flagship of CBC Television. It is part of a twinstick with Ici Radio-Canada Télé station CBUFT-DT (channel 26). The two stations share studios at the CBC Regional Broadcast Centre on Hamilton Street in downtown Vancouver; CBUT-DT's transmitter is located atop Mount Seymour in the district municipality of North Vancouver.

== History ==
CBUT logo, used in station IDs and print ads during most of the 1960s.

The station first signed on the air on December 16, 1953; as such, CBUT is the first and oldest television station in Western Canada. The station's original studio facilities were located inside a converted automotive dealership at 1200 West Georgia Street (on the intersection of Bute Street) in downtown Vancouver. However, CBUT was not the first television station to serve Vancouverites; KVOS-TV (channel 12, now a Univision affiliate), across the border in Bellingham, Washington, had signed on months earlier as a CBS affiliate. CBUT has broadcast exclusively in English for most of its existence, except for a period from 1964 to 1976 when French language programs from Télévision de Radio-Canada aired on weekend mornings; this secondary affiliation ended when CBUFT (channel 26) signed on in September 1976. CBUT was known mainly as "Channel 2" from its inception until 1976.

During the station's early years until 1976, CBUT's station IDs consisted of slides of local Vancouver landmarks with the CBUT logo (the number "2" in Clarendon Bold typeface, contained within a stylized television screen) overlaid, accompanied by the announcement "This is CBUT, Channel 2 in Vancouver"; the ID slide used at the end of local programs on CBUT featured a larger version of the station's logo on a navy blue background, accompanied by the announcement "This is CBC Television, Vancouver". Beginning with the introduction of CBC's "gem" logo in December 1974, CBUT (unlike other CBC Television O&Os, which continued using their own station IDs at the end of their local programs) began using the "gem" network ID at the end of all programming, both network-distributed and locally produced.

Updated CBUT logo, used in station IDs and print ads from the late 1960s to 1976. This version was based on the logo CBUT used during the 1960s.

In 1975, the CBC consolidated its Vancouver radio and television operations into one building. Prior to this, the CBC's Vancouver radio properties – CBU (690 AM), CBU-FM (105.7) and CBUF-FM (97.7) – had operated from a separate studio facility at 701 Hornby Street, within the basement of the Hotel Vancouver. Together, those stations formed the basis of the Regional Broadcast Centre at 700 Hamilton Street, a few blocks east of its previous radio and television facilities.

CBUT logo (as CBC British Columbia), used in station IDs and print ads from 1976 to at least 1980. The letter T in the logo is represented by a stylized totem pole.

The station's IDs were changed in 1976 when CBUT changed its on-air branding to "CBC British Columbia", with the initial IDs featuring a totem pole superimposed over local landmarks, after which the totem pole zoomed out and turned into the letter "T" in the station brand.

In recent years, CBUT, as with all CBC-owned stations, has de-emphasized local programming in favour of national network programming distributed out of Toronto. As of 2002, the station only aired sporadic local non-news programming and dropped all use of local station identifications in favour of using only network IDs; in addition, due to budget cuts, the CBC integrated CBUT's master control operations (as it did for all of its other owned-and-operated stations) into the master control facility at the Canadian Broadcasting Centre in downtown Toronto. Recently, however, CBUT has increased its local programming with the introduction of a locally themed lifestyle program, Living Vancouver (which has since been cancelled), as well as the addition of several new local newscasts.

== Programming ==
CBUT currently produces a number of programs for CBC Television. Portions of Marketplace are produced at CBUT, as were portions of the program Hemispheres, the now-cancelled national version of Canada Now and the late-night independent film program ZeD.

=== Sports programming ===
CBUT presents Vancouver Canucks hockey games when Canucks games are featured on CBC Television's Hockey Night in Canada NHL package produced by Sportsnet, the regional TV and radio rightsholder for the Canucks. Additionally, CBUT presents the Winter and Summer Olympics as part of CBC's rights deal with the International Olympic Committee.

=== News operation ===
Former logo used for local programming and station identification, 2015–2019

CBUT-DT presently broadcasts 8 1/2 hours of locally produced newscasts each week (with 90 minutes each weekday and 30 minutes each on Saturdays and Sundays); in regards to the number of hours devoted to news programming, it is the highest local newscast output among CBC Television's stations (either owned-and-operated or affiliated), although it now has the lowest newscast output among the Vancouver–Victoria market's television stations – its weekly news total is far behind CTV O&O CIVT-DT (channel 32) (which airs 38 hours of newscasts each week) and Global O&O CHAN-DT (channel 8) (which broadcasts 46 hours each week).

In years past, the supper hour newscast (which was a completely locally produced program until the introduction of the national Canada Now) was known as Hourglass, Newscentre, CBC Evening News, Broadcast One and CBC News: Vancouver. On February 19, 2007, CBUT restored an hour-long local newscast to its schedule with the debut of a local edition of CBC News at Six (which was later retitled CBC News: Vancouver in July of that year), which retained the Canada Now name and was originally anchored by former national Canada Now anchors Ian Hanomansing and Gloria Macarenko. In September 2009, the early evening newscast expanded to 90 minutes, with the addition of an hour-long block at 5 p.m. and the removal of the 6:30 p.m. half-hour of the program.

In April 2010, CBC Television entered into a news share agreement with CHEK, in which both stations share news story content and resources. Tony Parsons also joined the CBC to anchor both CBUT's early evening news block and CHEK's 10 p.m. newscast, remaining with both stations until his retirement in 2013. In addition, CHEK formerly carried a simulcast of CBC News: Vancouver at 6 and Vancouver at 11 while CBUT also produced a weekend 6 p.m. newscast for that station. As of April 10, 2016, CHEK no longer carries CBUT's newscasts; on October 5, 2015, CHEK replaced the 6 p.m. airing of CBC News: Vancouver (since renamed as CBC Vancouver News) with its own half-hour 6 p.m. newscast, hosted by former CTV and Global TV reporter Ben O'Hara-Byrne, while on April 10, 2016, CHEK dropped the 11 p.m. airing of CBC Vancouver News in favour of an encore presentation of the 10 p.m. CHEK newscast on weeknights and various programming on Sundays.

As of June 2013, weather segments seen on CBUT's newscasts are broadcast in HD, while video from other studio and field cameras are transmitted in standard definition and are upconverted to a 16:9 widescreen format.

On July 30, 2014, CBUT announced that Andrew Chang would begin anchoring the early evening newscasts starting September 1, succeeding Gloria Macarenko, who announced on her last day of her newscasts that she would become host of CBC Radio's The Story from Here. However, Macarenko will remain host of Our Vancouver while producing interview segments during CBUT's evening newscasts.

=== Current on-air staff ===
- Gloria Macarenko – host of On the Coast on CBC Radio One; Our Vancouver host; also special assignment reporter

=== Notable former on-air staff ===
- Adrienne Arsenault – reporter (1993–1998)
- Anita Bathe – anchor of CBC Vancouver News at 6 (2016–2025)
- Andrew Chang – anchor (2014-2017)
- Gillian Findlay – reporter (1982–1985)
- Dawna Friesen – reporter
- Bill Good – anchor
- Ian Hanomansing – anchor/reporter (1988–2010)
- Claire Martin – meteorologist
- Tony Parsons – 5, 5:30 and 6 p.m. anchor (2010–2013)
- Jack Webster – reporter, Hourglass
- Angela Sterritt – investigative reporter

== Technical information ==
=== Subchannel ===
Subchannel of CBUT-DT
Channel	Res.	Short name	Programming
2.1	720p	CBUT-DT	CBC Television

=== Analog-to-digital conversion ===
CBUT shut down its analog signal, over VHF channel 2, on August 31, 2011, the official date on which Canadian television stations in CRTC-designated mandatory markets transitioned from analog to digital broadcasts. The station's digital signal was relocated from its pre-transition UHF channel 58, which was among the high band UHF channels (52–69) that were removed from broadcasting use as a result of the transition, to post-transition channel 43, using virtual channel 2.

Post-transition, CBUT downconverted the high definition video resolution for its digital signal from 1080i to 720p.

=== Spectrum repacking ===
In April 2017, Industry Canada posted new channel assignments for stations as a result of spectrum repacking due to the U.S. 600 MHz spectrum auction. CBUT-DT moved to channel 35 on May 1, 2020. Channel 35 was previously occupied by KVOS-TV; that station moved to channel 14 in October 2019.

=== Former rebroadcasters ===
CBUT's over 85 analog rebroadcast transmitters were located on the Lower Mainland, Vancouver Island, the Okanagan, and areas not previously occupied by a private CBC affiliate.

Due to federal funding reductions to the CBC, in April 2012, the CBC responded with substantial budget cuts, which included shutting down CBC's and Radio-Canada's remaining analog transmitters on July 31, 2012. None of CBC or Radio-Canada's television rebroadcasters were converted to digital; CHAN-DT is the last major network station in Vancouver to operate rebroadcasters throughout the province.

== Out-of-market cable coverage ==
In addition to its coverage in British Columbia, CBUT has a significant American audience in Washington state. The station's signal is receivable over-the-air in the city of Bellingham. It is also available on cable to nearly one million Comcast subscribers in the Puget Sound region; Comcast's Puget Sound system also began offering CBUT's digital signal in high definition in July 2009. CBUT is also available in both standard and high definition in Western and Central Washington on Wave Broadband's systems in Western Washington as well as Lake Chelan area systems.
