= Mount Seymour =

Mountain in British Columbia, Canada

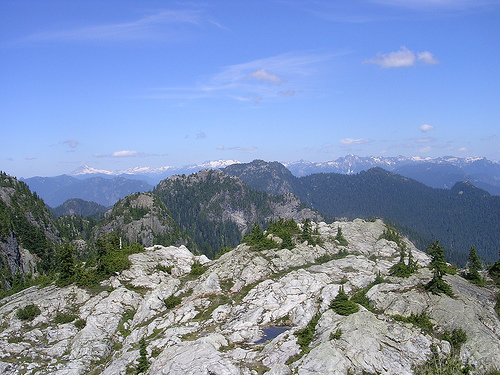
- View from Pump Peak, the first of two subpeaks of Mount Seymour.

Highest point
- Elevation: 1,449 m (4,754 ft)
- Prominence: 453 m (1,486 ft)
- Listing: Mountains of British Columbia
- Coordinates: 49°23′36″N 122°56′40″W

Geography
- Location within Greater Vancouver Regional District Location within British Columbia
- Interactive map of Mount Seymour
- Location: British Columbia, Canada
- District: New Westminster Land District
- Parent range: Fannin Range
- Topo map: NTS 92G7 Port Coquitlam

Climbing
- First ascent: 1908 C. Chapman; B. Darling; W. Gray; G. Harrow; R. Mills

Mount Seymour Ski Resort
- Interactive map of Mount Seymour Ski Resort
- Location: British Columbia, Canada
- Nearest city: North Vancouver
- Coordinates: 49°23′46″N 122°56′40″W
- Vertical: 330 m (1,083 ft)
- Top elevation: 1,265 m (4,150 ft)
- Base elevation: 935 m (3,068 ft)
- Skiable area: 81 ha (200 acres)
- Trails: 23 total 22% beginner 61% intermediate 17% expert
- Longest run: 1.6 km (1 mi)
- Lift system: 5 total 1 high speed detachable quad 1 quad fixed chairlift 1 double fixed chairlift 2 magic carpets
- Terrain parks: Yes
- Snowfall: 1,200 cm (472 in)
- Night skiing: Yes
- Website: https://www.mtseymour.ca/

Mount Seymour is a mountain located in Mount Seymour Provincial Park in the District of North Vancouver, British Columbia, Canada. It is a part of the North Shore Mountains, rising to the north from the shores of Burrard Inlet and Indian Arm to a summit of 1,449 m (4,754 ft) above the Indian River and Deep Cove neighbourhoods. Mount Seymour is most commonly identified for its ski area of the same name, and as a popular hiking area. It is named in honour of Frederick Seymour, second governor of the Colony of British Columbia. The name is used to refer to the ridge although the main summit is one of several, and is also known as Third Peak.

== History ==
In the 1920's a road was built ending in a parking lot part way up the mountain. The parking lot and a small shelter and bulletin board became the starting point for early hiking and skiing. In 1936 the area was designated as a provincial park. In 1938 under the ownership of the Swedish emigrant, Harald Enqvist, a lodge was built housing a ski rental and a cafeteria. In 1949 the Government of British Columbia, then a Liberal Conservative coalition under B.Johnson, extended the road to its present location and bought the ski area. The Government did not have the experience to run a ski area, so, they issued Mr. Enqvist the first Park Use Permit to operate the area. The name Enqvist was later spelled Enquist giving name to "The Enquist Lodge" and "Enquist Tube Park" among other facilities. When the permit expired in 1951, the government found a concessionaire, who was put in charge of running the lifts, ski school and cafeteria. Under government ownership the Mystery Peak double chairlift was installed in 1977. The government retained overall ownership until 1984, when Bill Bennett's Social Credit government privatized its operation. Under the contract the private resort operator owns all the equipment and facilities but pays rent for use of the park land. The contracts were for 60 (or 50) years and could be renewed after 30 years. Similar arrangements were made at the time for Ski resorts operating in Cypress Provincial Park and Manning Provincial Park.

The ski area has been run by the Wood family since 1984. They installed the Lodge chairlift, a short lift taking riders up to the main lodge, in 1986 and the Brockton chairlift, a lift taking riders up and beyond Mystery Peak, in the early 1990s. Starting in the 2010s, the mountain has been more aggressively upgraded. The original Mystery Peak chairlift was removed in 2012 and replaced with a high-speed quad, while the Goldie rope tow was replaced with a magic carpet. Next, Mt Seymour replaced the Lodge chair with a Doppelmayr fixed grip quad with a loading conveyor belt for the 2023–24 ski season.

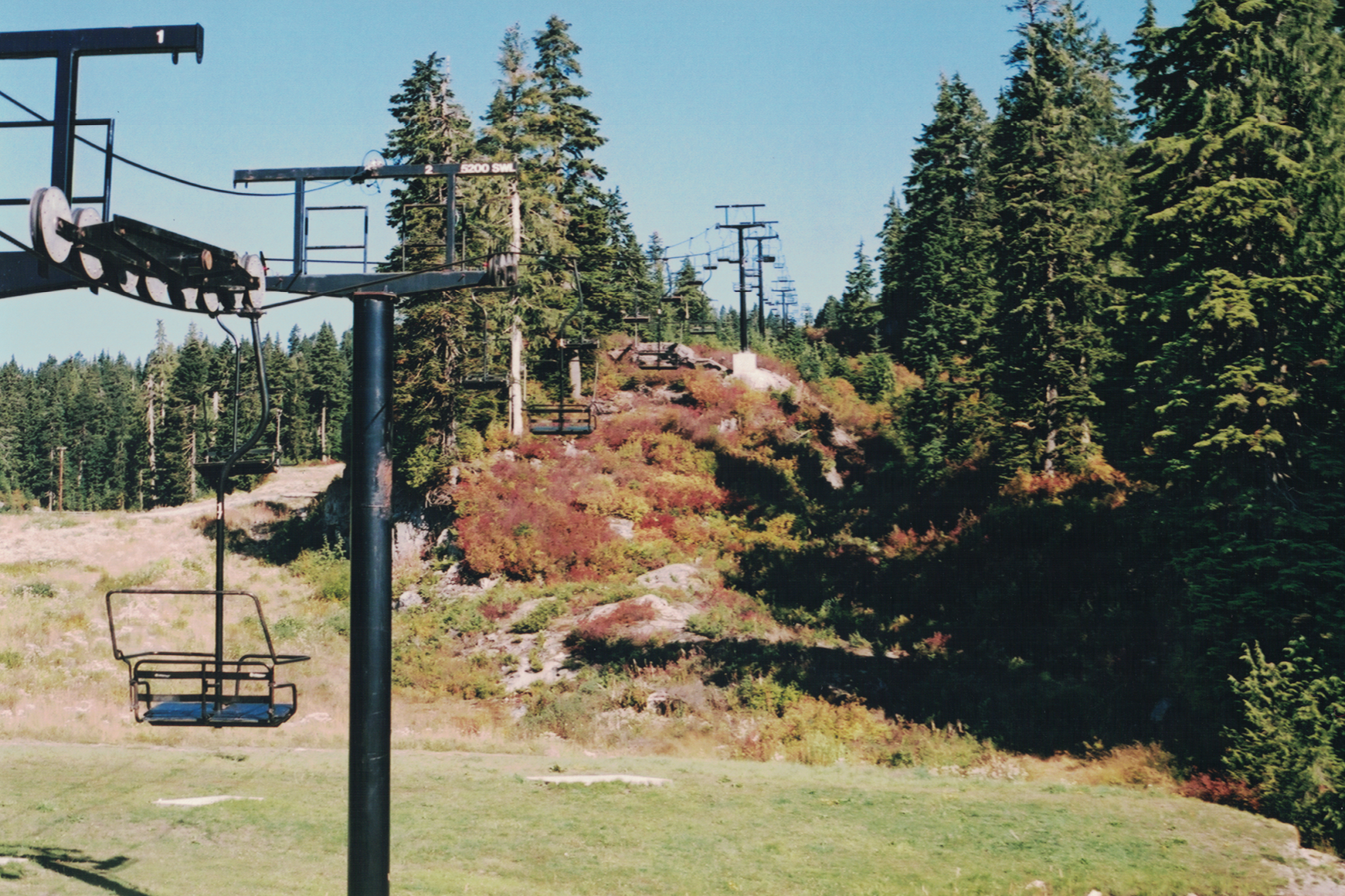
The original Mystery Peak chairlift, early 2000s.

On January 19, 2014, search and rescue leader Tim Jones died while coming down from the North Shore Rescue team cabin on Mount Seymour. Jones had saved many lives on the mountain over the years. Shortly after his death a community movement was formed to name the yet-unnamed Second Peak of Seymour after him. The BC government officially named the place Tim Jones Peak in 2017.

== Facilities ==
The Mount Seymour ski area has four lifts: the Mystery Peak Express, a high-speed quad chairlift, the Lodge Chairlift, a quad chairlift paired with a loading conveyor belt, Brockton double chairlift, and the Goldie Lake covered magic carpet. Another double chairlift, the Ridge Chair, was destroyed in a windstorm in 1998, and is currently still standing, though gradually rotting away. Another beginner lift, the Goldie Ropetow was removed in 2011 replaced by the magic carpet. The area offers 330 m (1,083 ft) of vertical drop and about 1,000 cm (394 in) of annual snowfall. Skiing and snowboarding are available on 40 marked trails and many unmarked routes. The longest trail is 1.6 km (1 mi) long (Unicorn) and 18 of the trails have night lighting. Four additional terrain parks exist for freestyle activities. Terrain has also been developed for snowtubing and tobogganing.

Guided and unguided snowshoeing takes place on a separate 10 km (6 mi) network of maintained trails. Backcountry access for snowshoeing and camping is permitted.

Mount Seymour's Enquist Cabin, located in the Tube Park Parking Lot was destroyed in a fire in the late spring of 2005. The cabin was available for rental and was the home of the Mount Seymour Ski Club. This cabin has been rebuilt, and has been in operation since the beginning of the 2010/2011 season.

== Snow depth ==
Mount Seymour has three weather stations: one at the bottom of the Mystery Peak Chairlift, one near tower 9 of the Mystery Peak Chairlift, and one just below Brockton Point which is the top lift station of the Brockton Chairlift. Except for the unusually warm winter of 2014-2015, there is usually a snow depth of 500 cm (197 in) or more at the Brockton weather station.

BCRFC historical records (from 1960 to 1989) report that Mount Seymour's average snow base has been 160 cm (63 in) on January 1, increasing through winter and spring to 345 cm (136 in) on May 1.

== Broadcasting ==
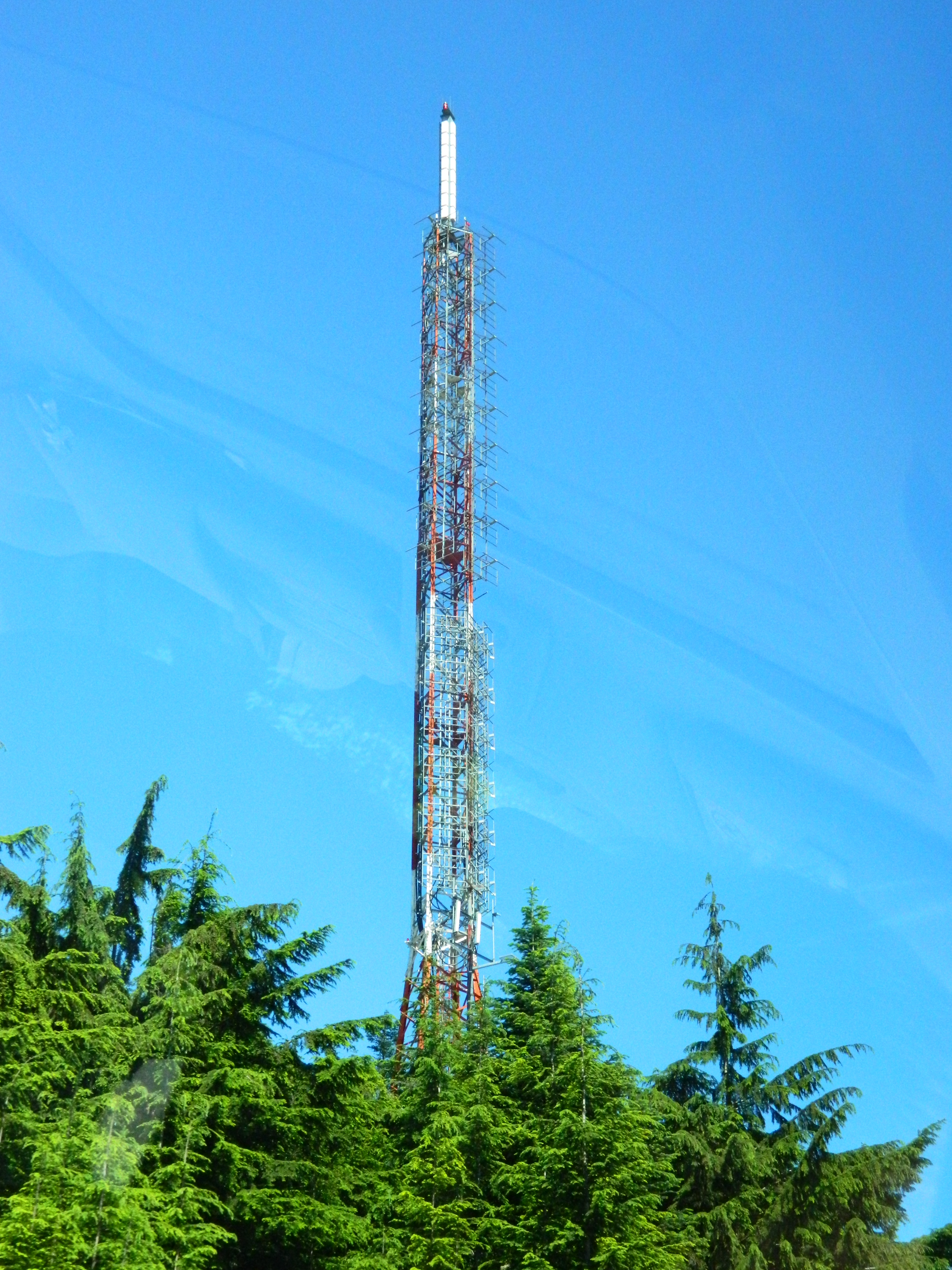
One of the five broadcast towers located on the mountain

Several Vancouver-area broadcasters use transmission towers located on Mount Seymour. On 16 December 1953, the first television broadcast in Western Canada was transmitted from this site by the Canadian Broadcasting Corporation's CBUT Channel 2. The CBC broadcasting site on Mount Seymour was both the first television broadcasting site in Western Canada and the first high elevation/mountain top broadcasting site in Canada.

=== FM stations ===
- CBU-2-FM 88.1 (CBC Radio One)
- CBUX-FM 90.9 (ICI Musique)
- CKYE-FM 93.1 (Red FM)
- CJJR-FM 93.7 (JR-FM)
- CFBT-FM 94.5 (Virgin Radio 94.5)
- CKZZ-FM 95.3 (Z 95.3)
- CHKG-FM 96.1 (Fairchild Radio)
- CJAX-FM 96.9 (Jack FM)
- CBUF-FM 97.7 (ICI Radio-Canada Première)
- CFOX-FM 99.3 (99.3 The Fox)
- CFMI-FM 101.1 (Rock 101)
- CKPK-FM 102.7 (The Peak)
- CHQM-FM 103.5 (Move 103.5)
- CHHR-FM 104.3 (LG 104.3 FM)
- CKKS-FM-2 104.9 (Kiss Radio)
- CBU-FM 105.7 (CBC Radio 2)
- CKAV-FM-2 106.3 (Aboriginal Voices Radio)

=== TV stations ===
- CBUT-DT Channel 2.1 (CBC): UHF 35 (digital)
- CHAN-DT Channel 8.1 (Global): UHF 22 (digital)
- CKVU-DT Channel 10.1 ("Citytv"): UHF 33 (digital)
- CIVI-DT-2 Channel 17.1 (rebroadcaster of CIVI-TV, CTV Two): UHF 17 (digital)
- CBUFT-DT Channel 26.1 (Radio-Canada): UHF 26 (digital)
- CIVT-DT Channel 32.1 (CTV): UHF 32 (digital)
- CHNM-DT Channel 42.1 (OMNI): UHF 20 (digital)
- CHNU-DT Channel 66.1 (Joy TV 10): UHF24 (digital)

== Filming location ==
Due to its easy road access and ample parking lots, Mount Seymour is often used as a filming location. Films and TV series shot using its forests, snowy slopes and region-spanning vistas include:

- MacGyver
- Highlander: The Series
- Pathfinder
- Stargate SG-1
- X-Files
- Hot Tub Time Machine
- The Twilight Saga: Eclipse

== See also ==
- List of ski areas and resorts in Canada
- Grouse Mountain
- Cypress Mountain
