= Canada Wide Media =

Canadian publishing company

Canada Wide Media Limited (CMW) is a publishing company in Western Canada, based in Burnaby, British Columbia.

== Background and history ==
Canada Wide Media Limited co-founder and CEO Peter Legge began with the purchase of a ten-cent magazine in 1976.

In 2023, CMW was bought by the Alive Publishing Group.

== Published titles ==
Canada Wide Media logo

=== Magazines ===
- BC Business magazine, British Columbia's regional business magazine
- TVWeek, a weekly local television entertainment news and listings magazine;

=== Directories and guides ===
- BCLNA Buyer's Guide;

=== Miscellaneous ===
- BC Ferries Schedule; and
- CanWest Show Guide.
