= North Shore Rescue =

North Shore Rescue members prepare to enter a hovering AS350B AStar Helicopter while leaving an incident crash site.

North Shore Rescue is a non-profit organization dedicated to wilderness search and rescue around Vancouver, British Columbia, Canada. It consists of a team of approximately 40 volunteers who perform an average of 79 search and rescue operations each year, mostly in the rugged, steep, and thickly forested North Shore Mountains. North Shore Rescue assists hikers, skiers, snowshoers, mountain bikers, and others who are reported to be lost or in distress. It also provides education on mountain safety, and some services in urban search and rescue.

== History ==
North Shore Rescue formed in September 1965, originally with the intention of preparing to assist in the event of an urban nuclear attack by the Soviet Union. After the threats of the Cold War subsided, the group transitioned to wilderness search and rescue tasks. The team has since been involved in more than 1000 mountain search and rescue operations. Injuries or deaths were involved in approximately 25% of calls. As extreme sports and other wilderness activities have become more popular in the region, the need for rescues has risen dramatically, with call volume tripling between 1995 and 2005.

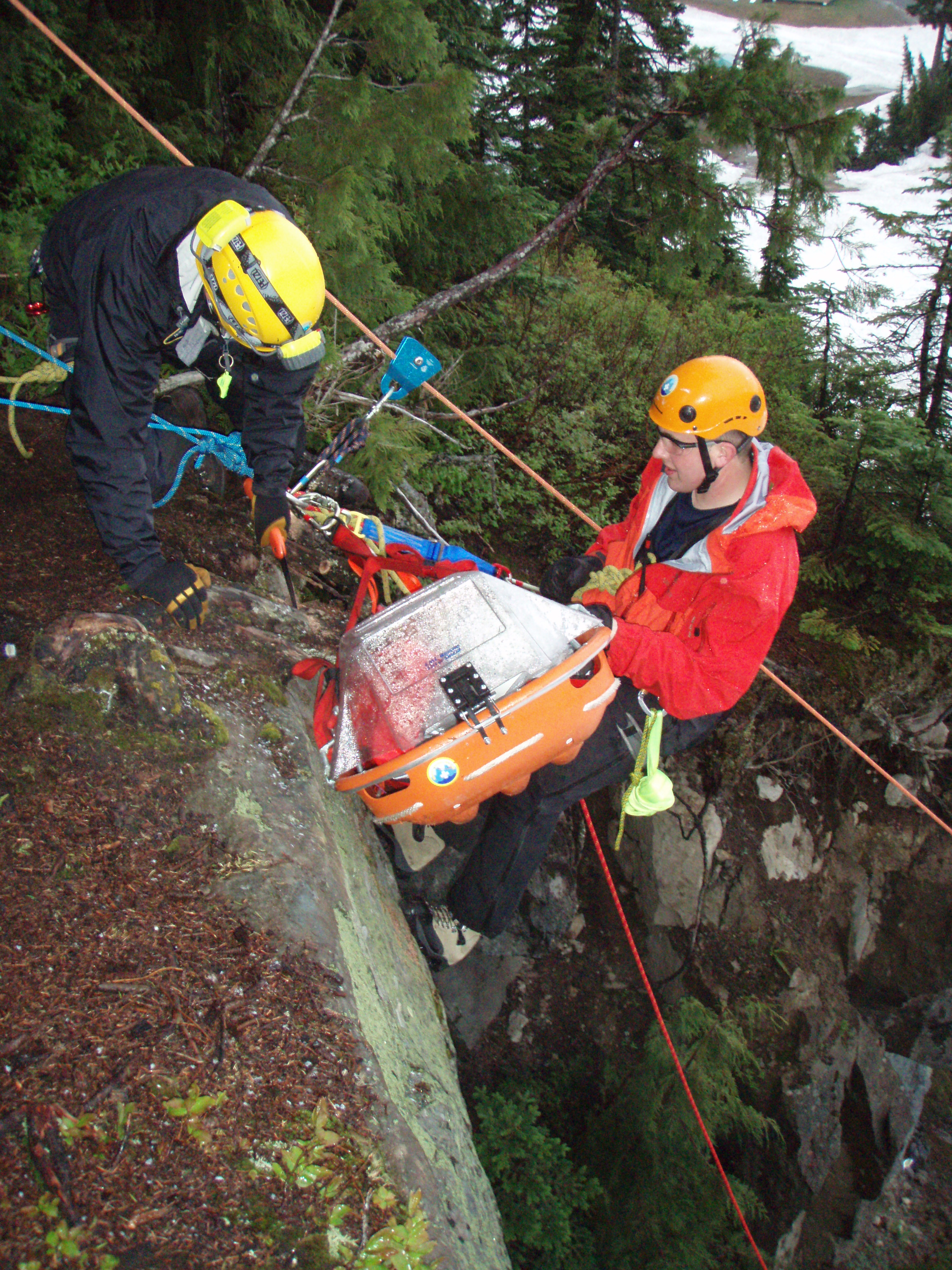
North Shore Rescue members perform a rescue training exercise on a vertical cliff.

== Operations ==
North Shore Rescue volunteers respond at the discretion of police, often after family members or friends call 9-1-1 to report that someone has failed to return from an outing in the mountains. Because the North Shore Mountains are very close to Vancouver, the dangers of their terrain and weather are often underestimated. Underpreparation and recklessness are factors in many incidents.

In addition to searching on foot, the team sometimes uses a Helicopter Flight Rescue System, in which a volunteer is lowered from a helicopter via a rope to evacuate a stranded and/or injured person.

The team has an annual budget of approximately $250,000, which covers team equipment, fuel, and medical supplies. Its budget is covered in part by government funding, however the organization also relies on fundraising and private donations. All operations are provided free of charge to the lost or injured persons involved. The group's position is based in the belief that charging for rescues could encourage people to delay in calling for assistance, and even occasionally lead to subjects hiding from rescuers in order to avoid being charged.

The group concentrates its efforts in the 480 km^{2} area of the North Shore Mountains near Vancouver. However, its skills and equipment are occasionally called into play by other agencies looking for missing persons. Sgt. Ron Fairweather of the Vancouver Police Department has said, "They're an awesome unit, the equipment they have is phenomenal. We don't have the extent of equipment they have access to. And their expertise is second to none."

== Volunteers ==
The all-volunteer team is made up of highly skilled hikers, mountaineers and backcountry skiers, some of whom dedicate more than 500 hours per year and often conduct rescues at night, in bad weather, and on short notice. The team trains together every fourth weekend and every Tuesday night. Volunteers also attend special courses, devote time to education and fundraising, and pay for their own personal equipment and clothing. Recruiting and retaining skilled volunteers is an ongoing challenge, and in 2007, the Vancouver Courier reported that the team's most experienced leaders were nearing retirement age.

Some volunteers have served for decades, and as of 2007 the team included three father-son pairs.

In 2005, to celebrate the 40th anniversary of North Shore Rescue, a group including team members set out to climb Mount Logan. The expedition nearly became a tragedy after a severe storm hit, trapping three team members on an exposed ridge. All were rescued, although one team member suffered severe frostbite.

In 2008, team members Tim Jones and Gord Ferguson received a Royal Canadian Mounted Police commendation for their role in saving the life of a snowshoer in a three-day-long rescue operation on Mount Seymour.

On January 19, 2014, North Shore Rescue Team Leader, Tim Jones (Search and Rescue), died while hiking down from the team cabin on Mount Seymour.

== Gallery ==
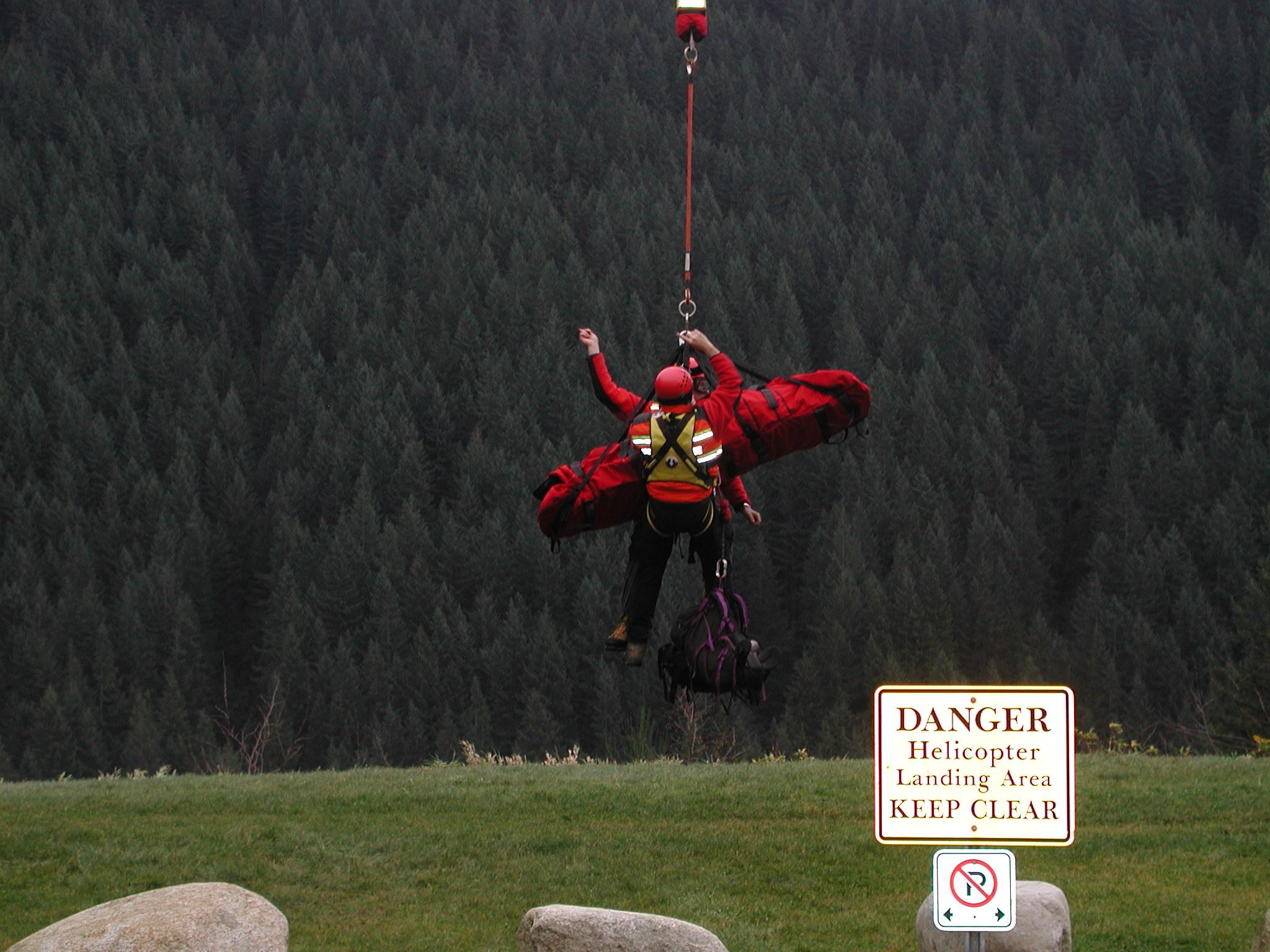
HFRS Technicians with North Shore Rescue training

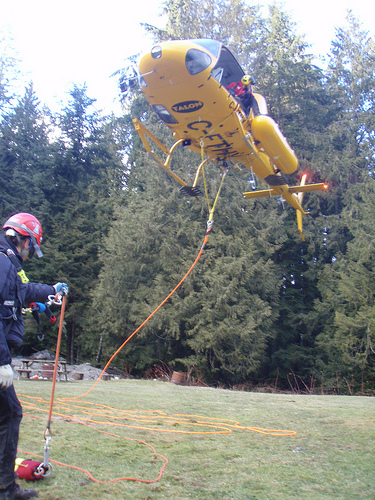
HFRS system

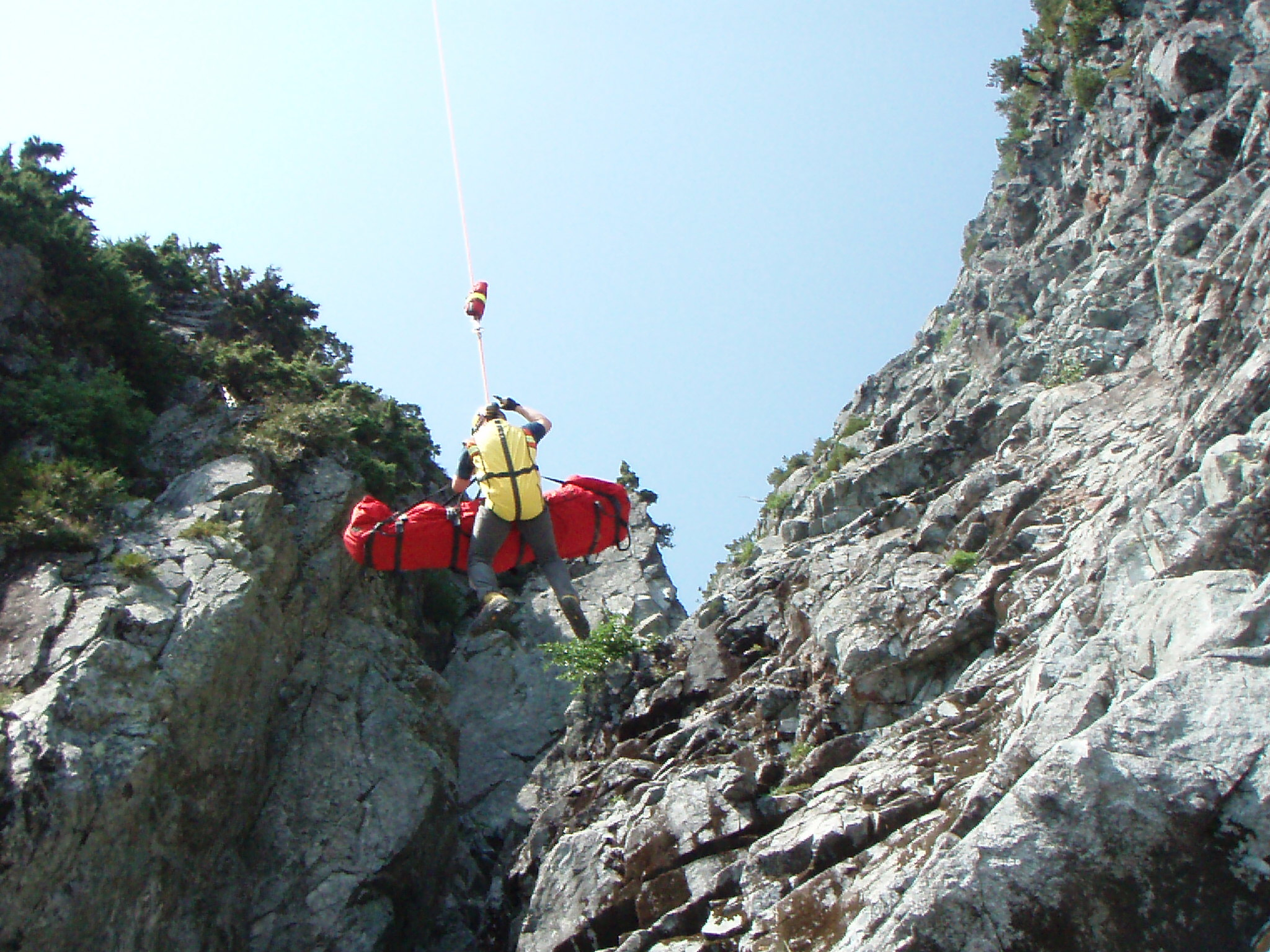
Injured climber being evacuated from The Lions (peaks)

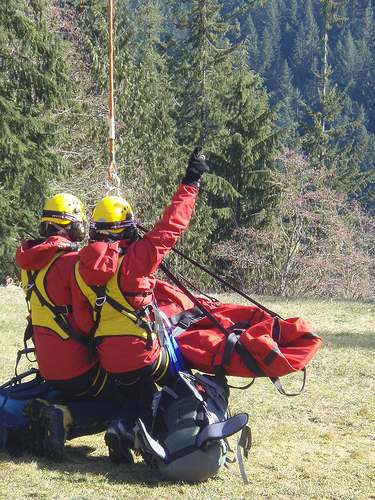
Tandem HFRS team

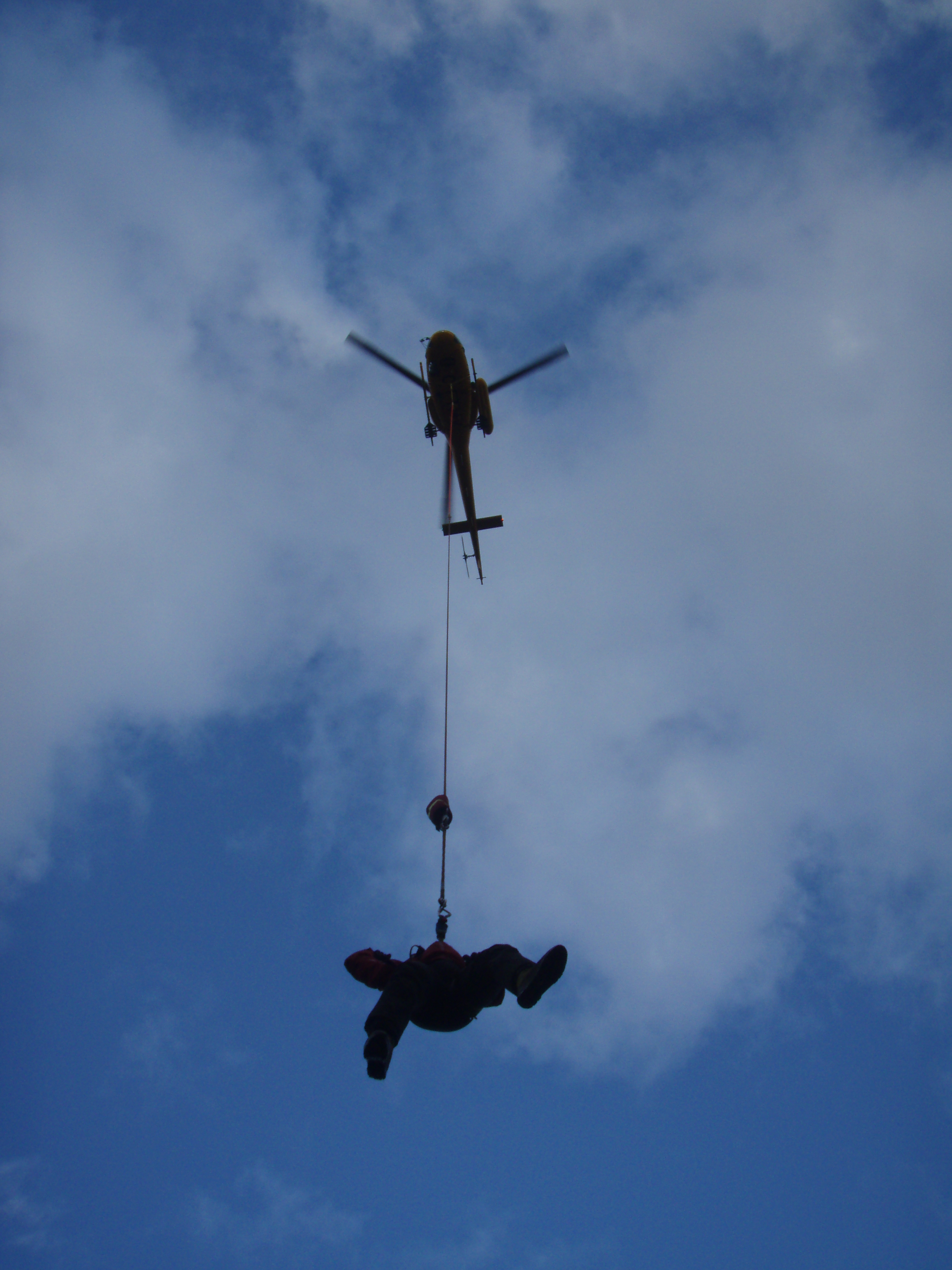
HFRS

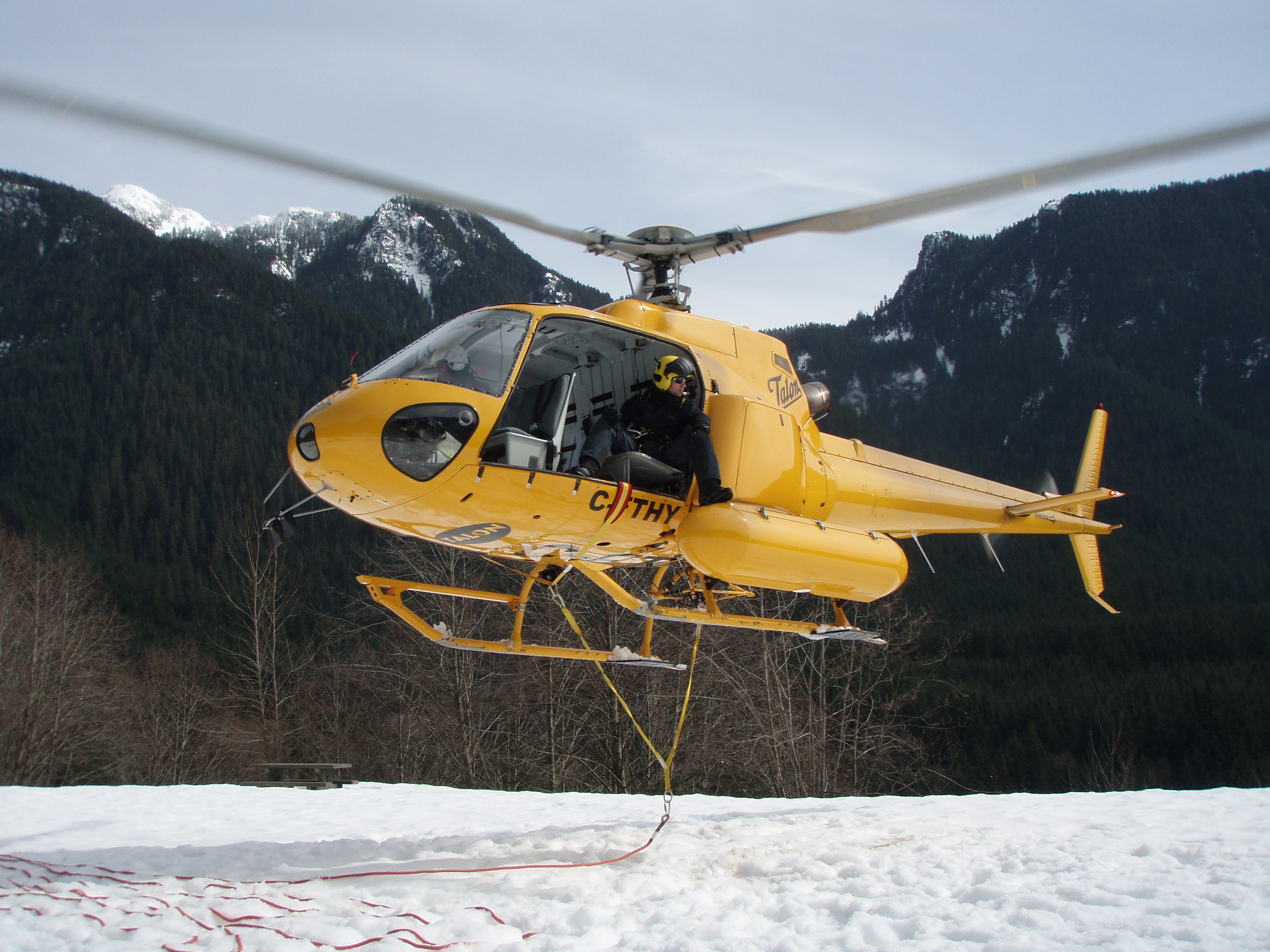
Spotter going up for HET's evolution

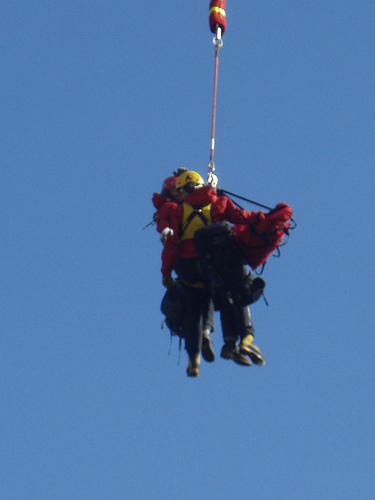
Tandem rescue with ARP

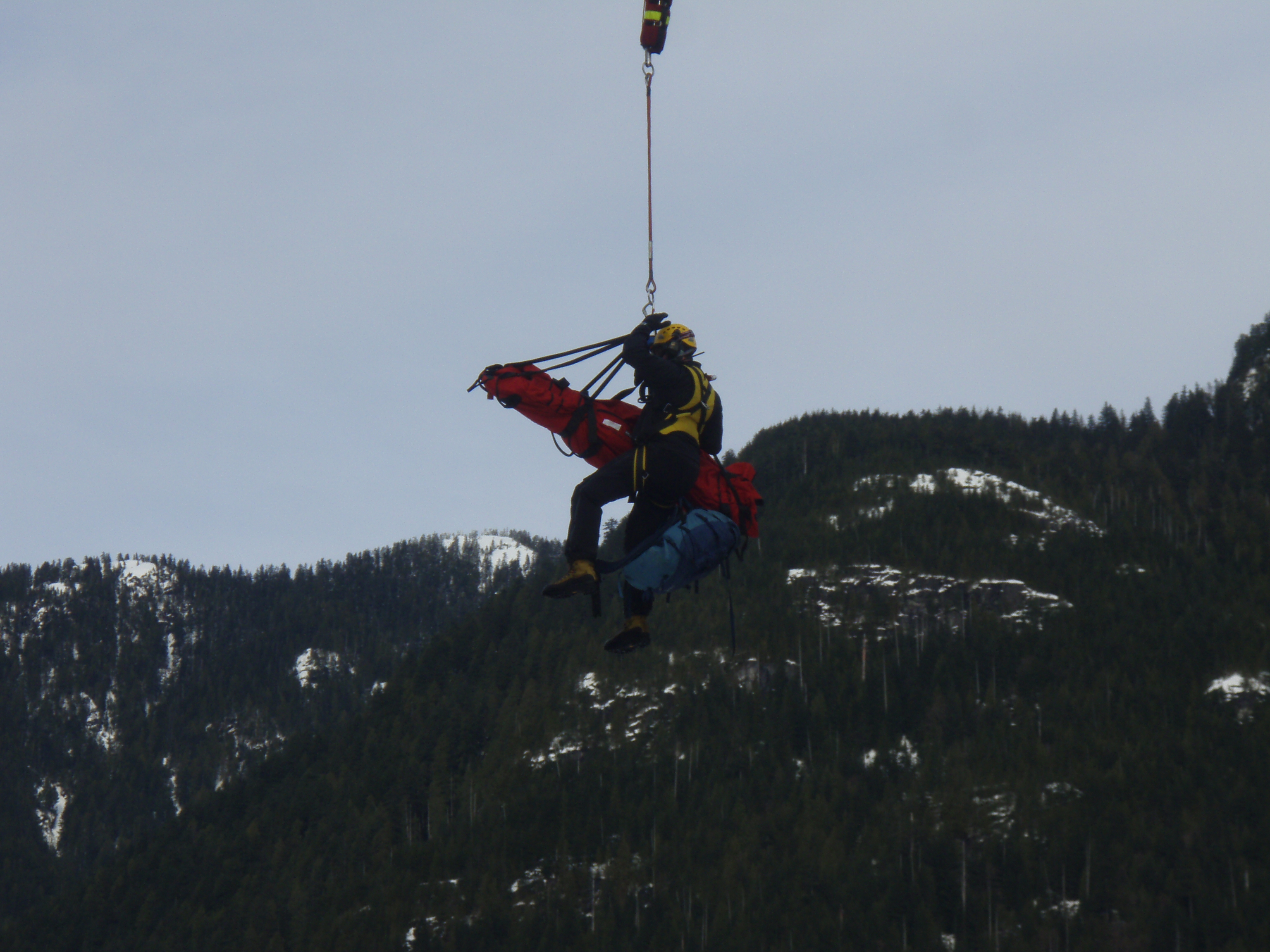
HFRS Tech landing
