= CBUFT-DT =

Television station in Vancouver, Canada

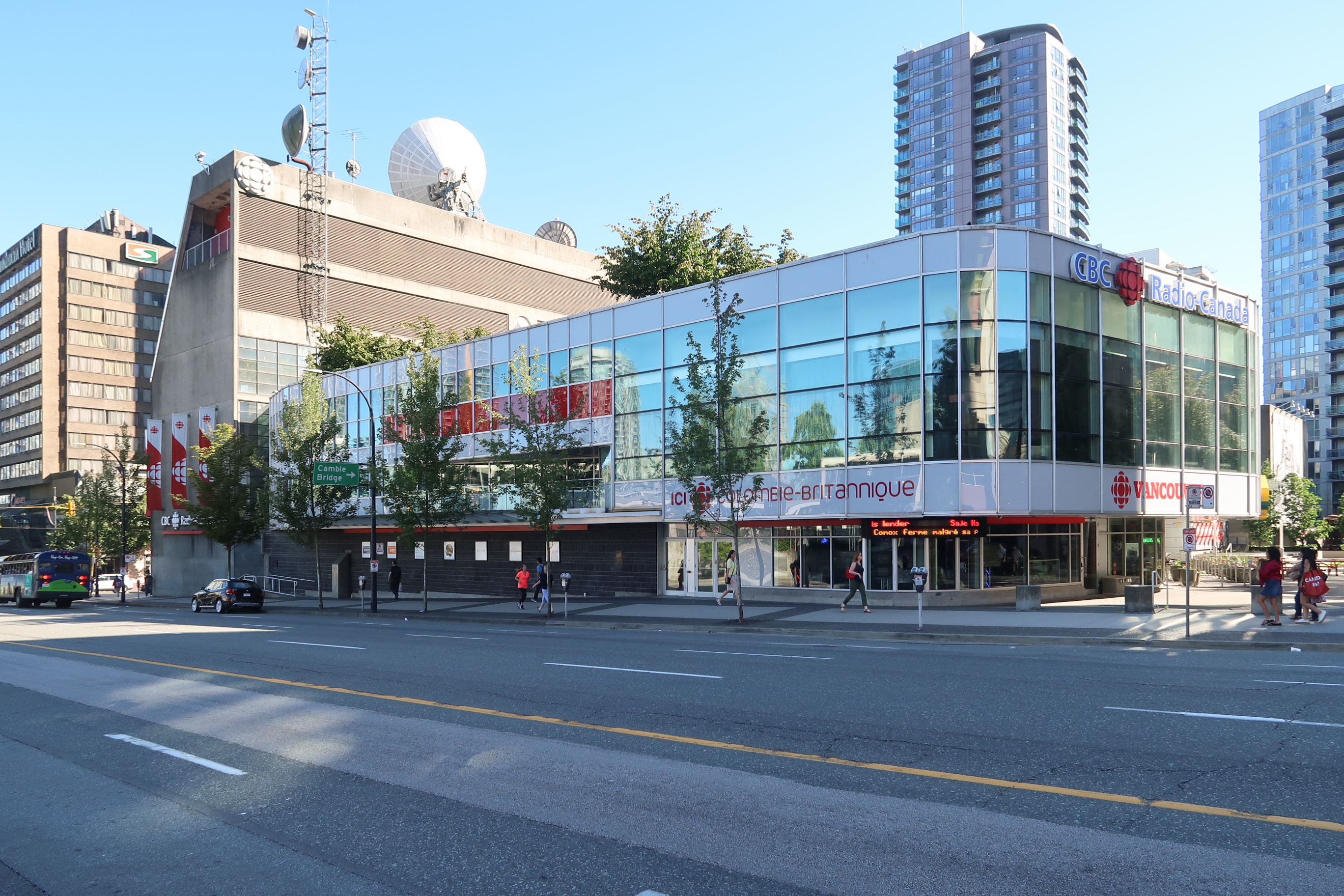
- ICI Colombie-Britannique's studios at the CBC Regional Broadcast Centre in downtown Vancouver.
- Vancouver, British Columbia; Canada
- Channels: Digital: 26 (UHF); Virtual: 26
- Branding: ICI Colombie-Britannique

Programming
- Affiliations: 26.1: Ici Radio-Canada Télé

Ownership
- Owner: Société Radio-Canada
- Sister stations: TV: CBUT-DT; Radio: CBU (AM), CBU-FM, CBUF-FM, CBUX-FM

History
- First air date: September 27, 1976
- Former call signs: CBUFT (1976–2011)
- Former channel numbers: Analog: 26 (UHF, 1976–2011)
- Call sign meaning: CBC Vancouver Français Télévision

Technical information
- Licensing authority: CRTC
- ERP: 27.52 kW
- HAAT: 615.4 m (2,019 ft)
- Transmitter coordinates: 49°21′13″N 122°57′24″W

Links
- Website: ici.radio-canada.ca/colombie-britannique-et-yukon/

CBUFT-DT (channel 26) is an Ici Radio-Canada Télé station in Vancouver, British Columbia, Canada, which serves the province's Franco-Columbian population and Franco-Yukonnais in Yukon. It is part of a twinstick with CBC Television station CBUT-DT (channel 2). The two stations share studios at the CBC Regional Broadcast Centre on Hamilton Street in downtown Vancouver; CBUFT-DT's transmitter is located atop Mount Seymour in the district municipality of North Vancouver.

== History ==
The station first signed on the air on September 27, 1976, on UHF channel 26; as Vancouver's second UHF television station after CKVU-TV (channel 21, now on channel 10); it took Radio-Canada programming from CBUT-TV (channel 2), which had previously aired select programs from the network on weekend mornings since 1964; upon CBUFT's sign-on, CBUT became an exclusive English-language station again.

== Technical information ==
=== Subchannel ===
Subchannel of CBUFT-DT
Channel	Res.	Short name	Programming
26.1	720p	CBUFT	Ici Radio-Canada Télé

=== Analog-to-digital conversion ===
On August 31, 2011, the official date on which Canadian television stations in CRTC-designated mandatory markets transitioned from analog to digital broadcasts, CBUFT flash cut its digital signal into operation on UHF channel 26. Following the transition, the station's over-the-air signal coverage area expanded to include parts of the Saanich Peninsula, though reception in Victoria varies depending on the area.

CBUFT's transmits its digital signal in the 720p resolution format. This differs from the majority of terrestrial television stations in Canada that broadcast digital signals, which transmit HD programming in the 1080i format.

=== Former transmitters ===
CBUFT formerly operated seven analog rebroadcast transmitters, which broadcast in some of the larger British Columbia communities such as Kelowna and Kamloops. CBUFT's content was also broadcast on a transmitter in Whitehorse, Yukon, although that transmitter was technically licensed to Montreal sister station CBFT-TV. It also formerly operated rebroadcast transmitters in Chilliwack, Dawson Creek, Kitimat, Lillooet, Logan Lake, Prince George and Terrace.

Due to federal funding reductions to the CBC, in April 2012, the CBC responded with substantial budget cuts, which included shutting down CBC's and Radio-Canada's remaining analog transmitters on July 31, 2012. None of CBC or Radio-Canada's television rebroadcast transmitters were converted to digital, leaving rural Canadians and U.S. border regions with no free over-the-air Radio-Canada coverage, requiring a subscription to a cable or satellite provider to receive programming from the two networks in those areas.

==== British Columbia ====
City of license	Callsign	Channel
Chilliwack	CBUFT-6	14 (UHF)
Dawson Creek	CBUFT-5	33 (UHF)
Kamloops	CBUFT-2	50 (UHF)
Kelowna	CBUFT-1	21 (UHF)
Kitimat	CBUFT-7	8 (VHF)
Prince George	CBUFT-4	4 (VHF)
Terrace	CBUFT-3	11 (VHF)

==== Yukon ====
City of license	Callsign	Channel	Notes
Whitehorse	CBFT-TV-15	7 (VHF)	Part of the license for CBFT-TV—Montreal, but repeated CBUFT's signal.
