= TVWeek =

Canadian television magazine

TVWeek is a weekly local television entertainment news and listings magazine owned by Canada Wide Media Limited, which acquired the magazine in 1976. The magazine is generally sold in the Metro Vancouver area, and is generally slanted towards television and entertainment news and listings for the region.

TVWeek is based in Vancouver. The magazine once competed with the Canadian TV Guide, when the latter was still in publication.

Since 2001, Brent Furdyk has been the magazine's editor-in-chief.
