= Helicopter flight rescue system =

System to carry people below a helicopter in flight

2012 NSR Crown Mountain Rescue

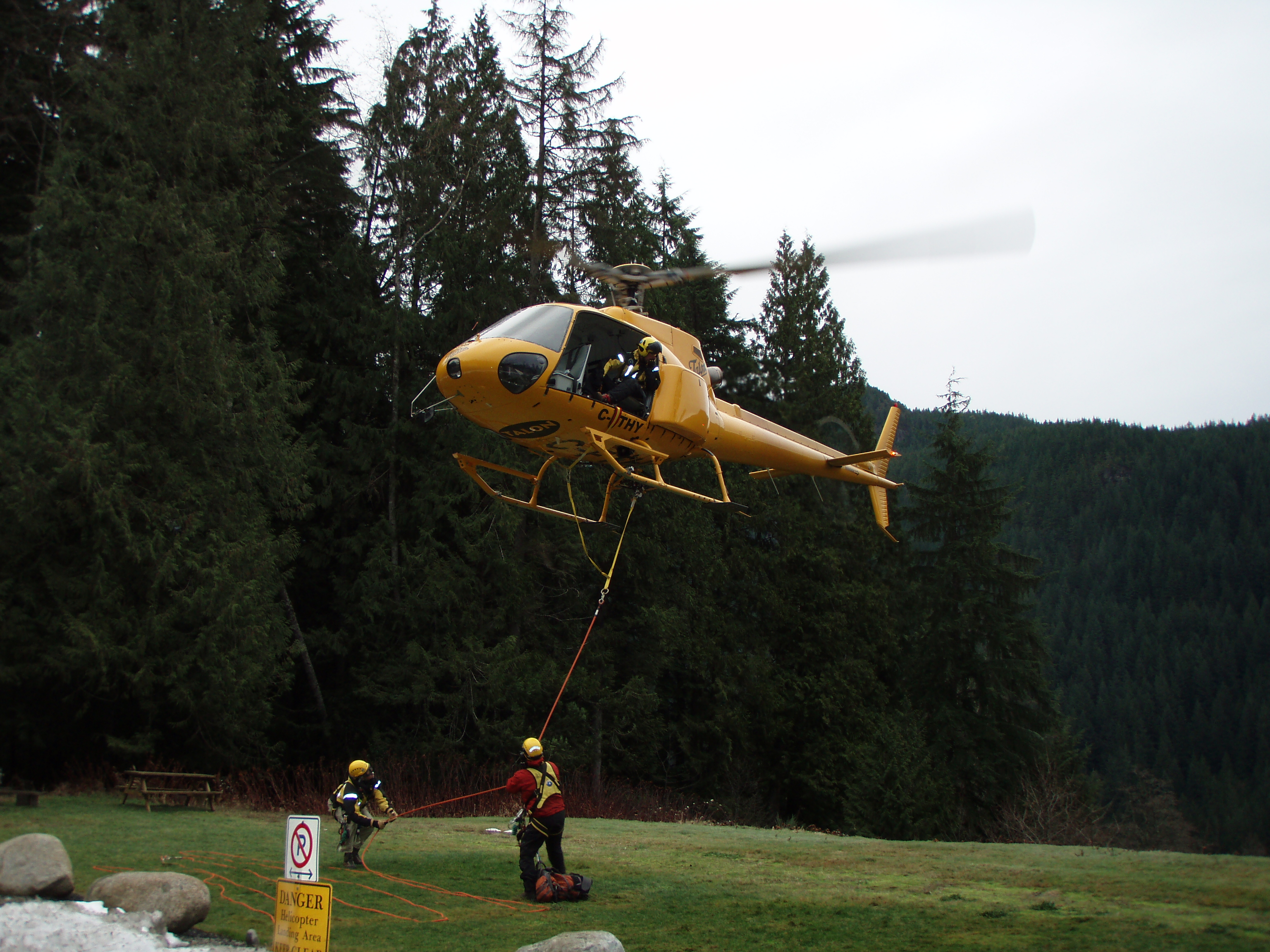
A rescue in progress

The helicopter flight rescue system (HFRS) is a helicopter insertion and extraction tool that utilizes a longline and personnel carrying device system (PCDS) to carry human loads below a helicopter in flight. These systems are often referred to as "long line", "short haul", Class D fixed line (CDFL), and other terms, and is similar to other helicopter long line systems in use throughout the world. By extending a rescuer below the aircraft and allowing the aircraft to remain clear of obstacles while a rescue is performed, a pilot can insert or extract rescuers and subjects in most types of terrain (slope angle, obstacles, and hazards permitting).

Under Canadian aviation regulations, HFRS falls under Class D operations which includes all human loads carried externally, commonly referred to as "human external cargo" (HEC). By regulation, air carriers, operations personnel, and essential aircrew conducting Class D operations are required to be extensively trained. There must also be a memorandum of understanding between the tasking agency and the air operator in order to ensure a good working relationship. In British Columbia, Emergency Management BC (EMBC) enables volunteer search and rescue societies to perform HFRS to conduct various rescue missions.

HFRS refers to the particular set of equipment approved by regulatory authority and sold as an integrated package or kit, suitable for use on a specific helicopter models and configurations. The system is modular and various components can be attached or detached as the need arises. Examples of modular components include a rescue basket, an "aerial rescue platform" (commonly known as a "Bouwman bag"), and various rescuer harnesses. The line length can be adjusted for various conditions such as tree canopy. A critical factor of these systems is a redundant method of connection between the longline and the helicopter that is intended to prevent inadvertent load release while still allowing for intentional release. This redundancy comes in two basic forms, a belly band, or dual hook. Both systems provide a second attachment point that can be released by the pilot (or assistant on board) in the event of a bona fide emergency requiring the jettisoning of the load.

A similar technique is used by linemen when constructing or maintaining power lines, and by maritime pilots between ship and shore.

== In British Columbia ==
HFRS was pioneered in Canada by Parks Canada, who performed the first rescues using the long line system in the 1960s. From there, the system became commercialized, and available to industrial and search and rescue teams outside of the Parks Canada Safety Program. One of the earliest SAR teams in Canada to adopt the commercial system was North Shore Rescue, and was eventually followed by other teams with high call volumes, and mountainous terrain such as Golden SAR, Nelson SAR and Squamish SAR. These organizations recognized a need to move beyond reliance on conventional hover entry-exit techniques (still widely used). The system has proved to be safe, and cost effective, and now constitutes part of the search and rescue safety plans within the province of BC, with over 15 teams currently using the technique.

This kind of aerial maneuver originated in the Swiss Alps. In 1970, a mountain guide with Air Zermatt performed the first longline mountain rescue on the North face of the Eiger. This mission forever changed mountain rescue operations

== Components ==
The HFRS has multiple components which ultimately safely suspend a rescuer under the helicopter (extended below the skids) with two distinct actions required to release the load, and load bearing redundancy. The components include:

Component	Description
Dual hook	A second cargo hook (sometime two hooks replacing the existing cargo hook) that is fitted to the aircraft to provide the redundancy the system requires. The complete system allows for a pilot to release each hook independently by one of two methods of release.
Belly band	A strap which is fitted through the cabin of the aircraft (encircling the aircraft structure) that provides a secondary point of attachment and release. This adds the redundancy the system requires. Release is achieved with an integrated quick release device, similar to that used on parachutes. Some systems are designed such that the pilot cannot reach the release mechanism from their seat and therefore a second person able to release the system is required.
Y-lanyard	A Y-lanyard connects the two aircraft attachment points to the main load line and is designed to retain connection between the main load line and the aircraft in the event that one of the hooks is inadvertently released.
Main load line	A main load line is a low-stretch aeronautically approved rope used to suspend a load under an aircraft. This line can be of varying lengths or combined segments depending on the needs of the operation.
Flight harness	A flight harness is used for the carriage of trained personnel (rescuers). The harness allows for secure comfortable flight and maximum mobility. In most cases this is a full-body style harness and can vary from specifically designed harnesses to off the shelf harnesses commonly used by workers working at height.
Rescue harness	A rescue harness is used for the carriage of an untrained person (typically subject or victim in need of rescue). The harness can be rapidly applied to a person and then attached to the main load line. Variations: screamer suit, Evac harness, helitack hotseat, Pitagor Evac triangle, air rescue vest.
Stretcher carriage device	A stretcher carriage device is used for carriage of an injured subject unable to use a rescue harness (due to the nature of injury or ailment). The subject is (usually) secured to a stretcher and the stretcher is placed and secured inside the device. The device is then attached to the main load line. Variations: Bauman bag, aerial platform bag, helitack airbag, air rescue extraction system, aerial rescue platform, Sked stretcher.

== Pictures ==
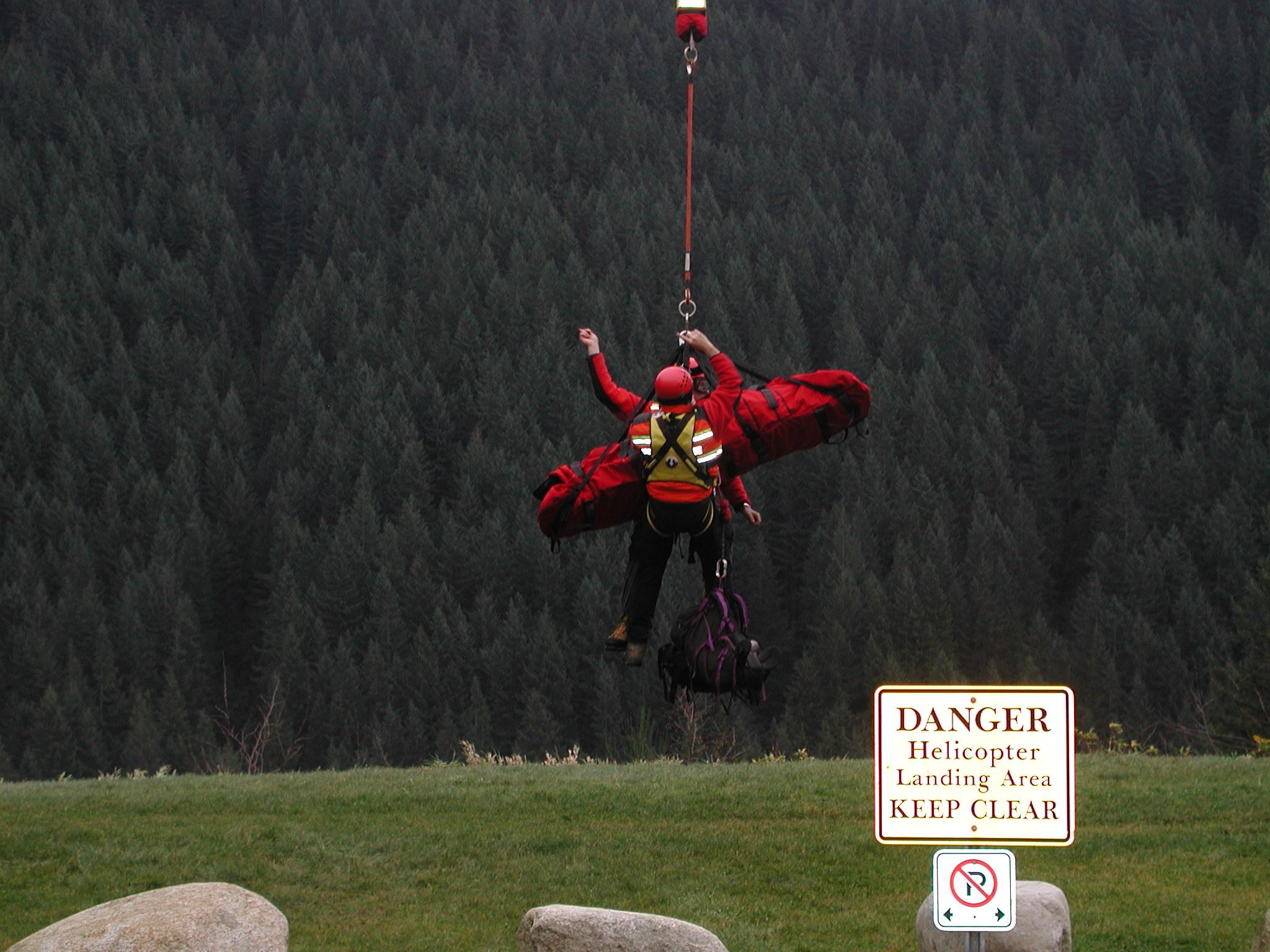
HFRS technicians with North Shore Rescue training

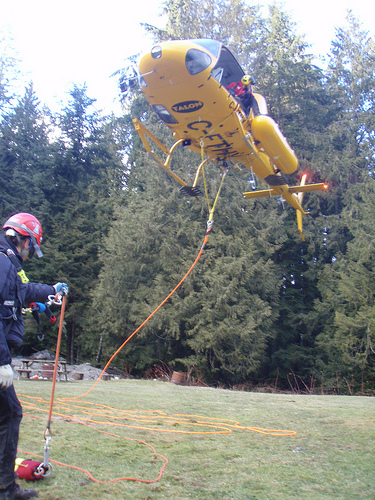
The carriage system that suspends the rescuer underneath the helicopter

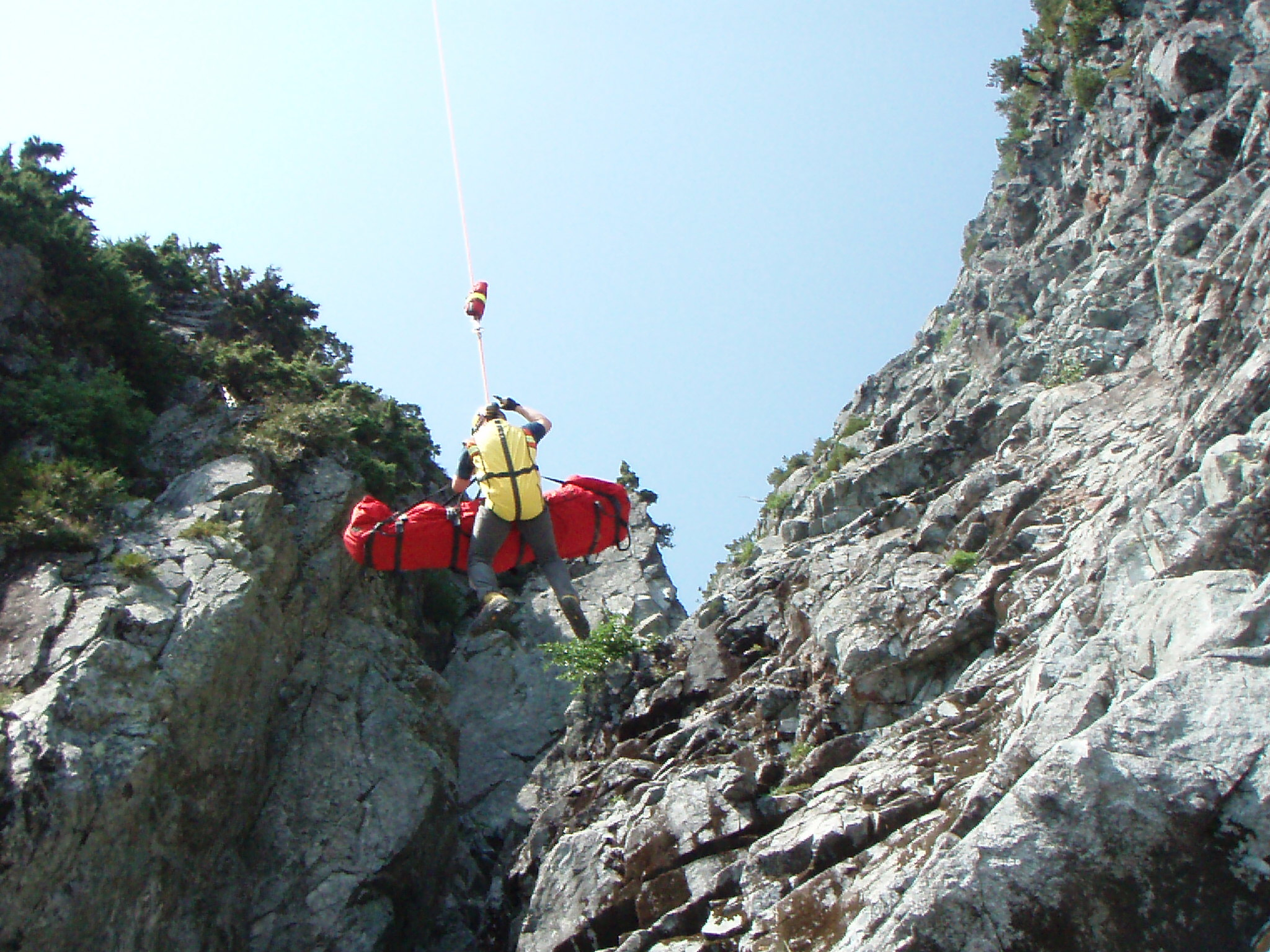
HFRS system used by North Shore Rescue to evacuate seriously injured climber.

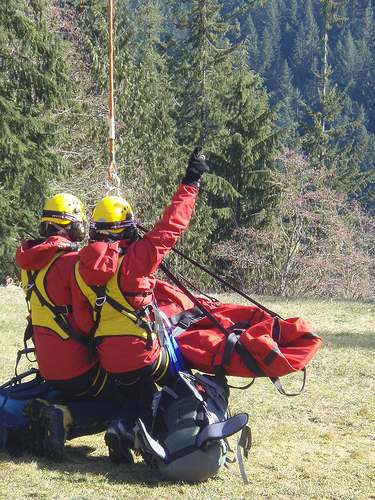
HFRS technicians preparing for takeoff in tandem with an aerial rescue platform (used to evacuate injured subjects)

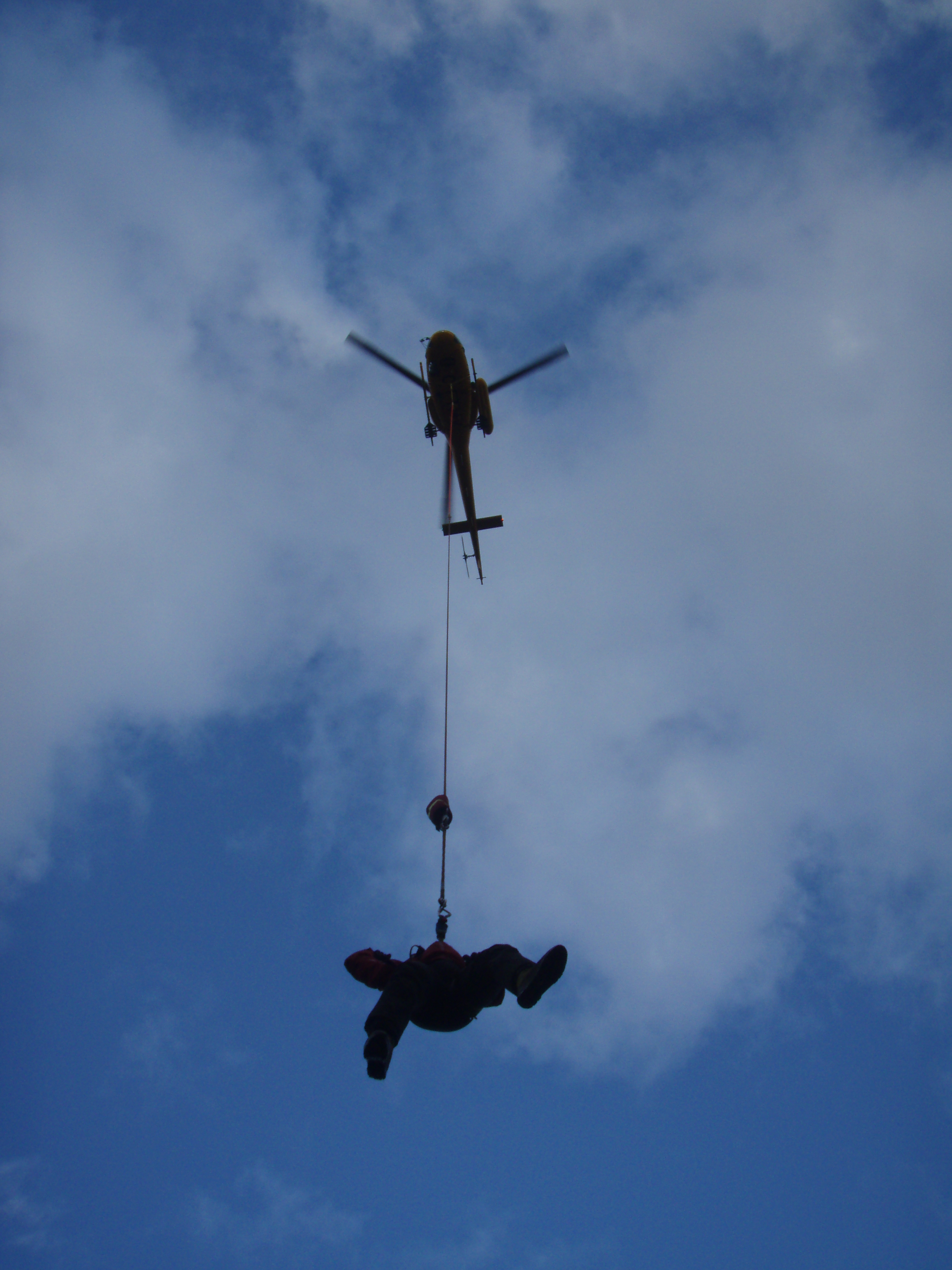
North Shore Rescue HFRS technician performing a flight evolution

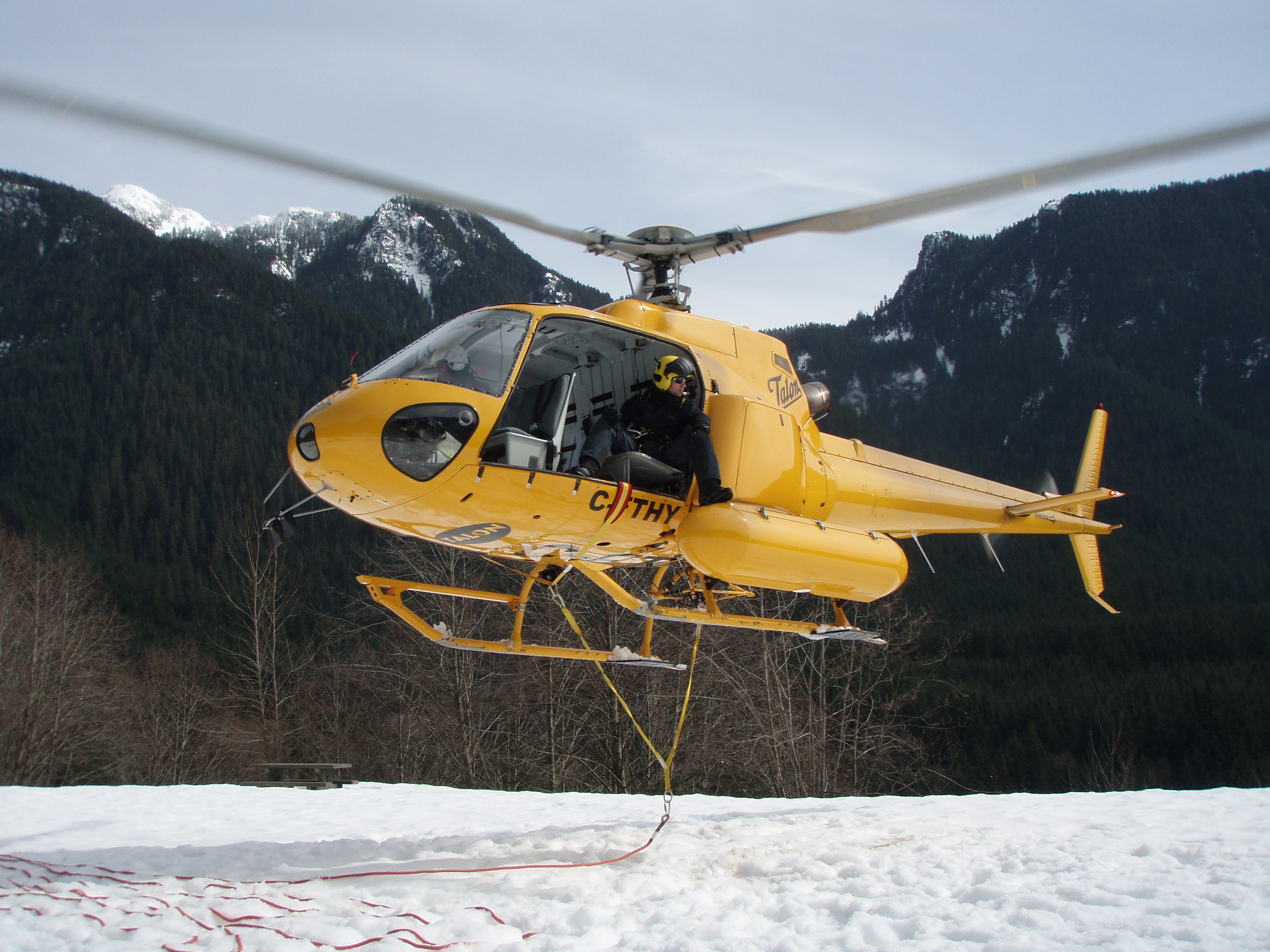
The spotter position, responsible for watching the load and releasing it an emergency

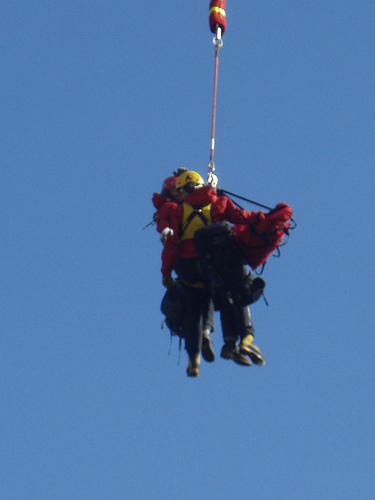
HFRS technicians landing in tandem with the aerial rescue platform

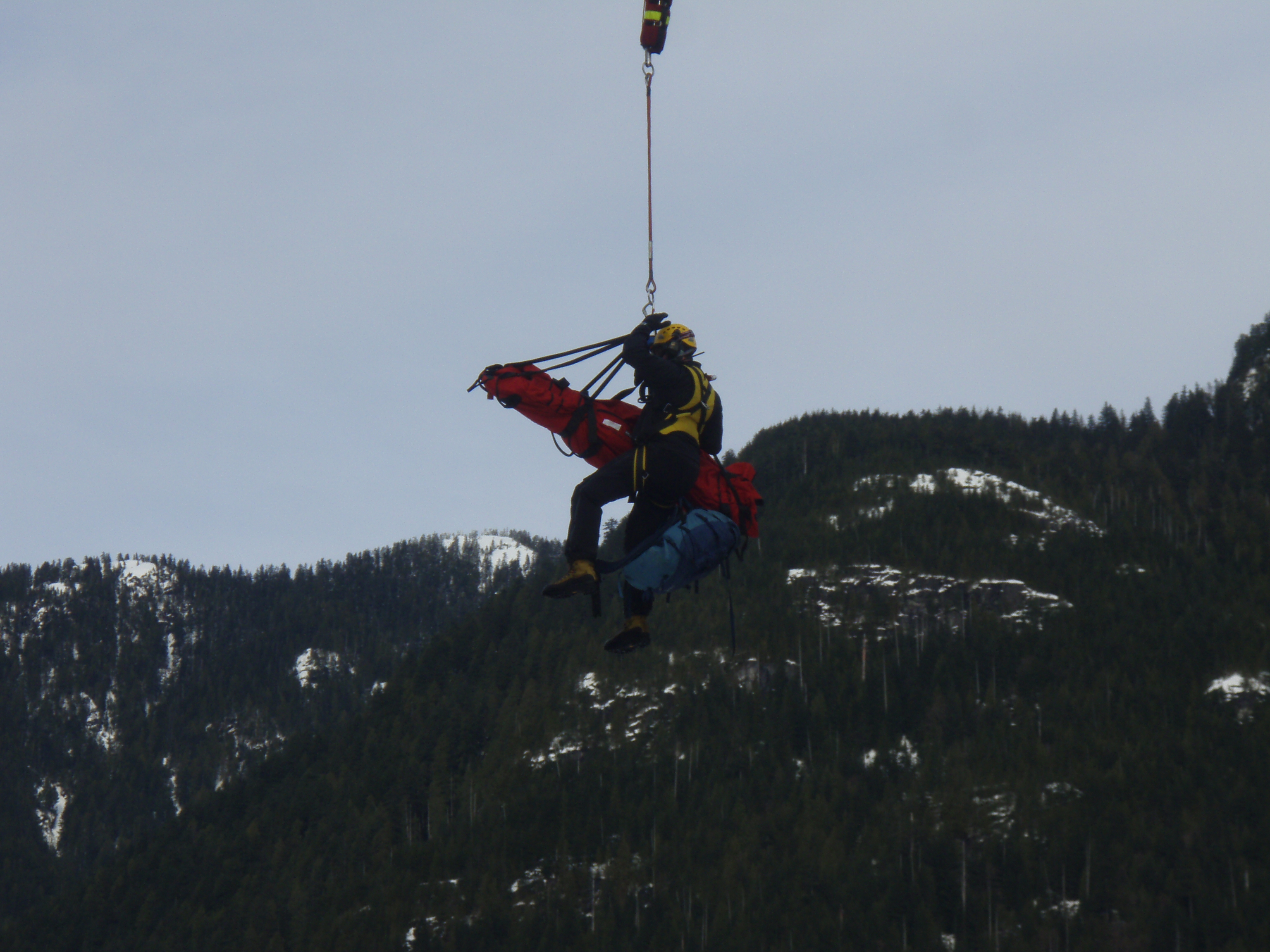
HFRS technician landing with the aerial rescue platform
