= CBU-FM =

CBC Music radio station in Vancouver, Canada

- Vancouver, British Columbia; Canada
- Broadcast area: British Columbia; Yukon: Dawson City, Whitehorse, Yellowknife
- Frequency: 105.7 MHz

Programming
- Format: Adult Contemporary/Public music
- Network: CBC Music

Ownership
- Owner: Canadian Broadcasting Corporation
- Sister stations: CBU, CBU-2-FM, CBUF-FM, CBUX-FM, CBUT-DT, CBUFT-DT

History
- First air date: December 12, 1947
- Call sign meaning: Canadian Broadcasting Corporation Vancouver (U)

Technical information
- Licensing authority: CRTC
- Class: C
- ERP: 31,733 watts (average); 95,800 watts (peak)
- HAAT: 610 metres (2,000 ft)
- Transmitter coordinates: 49.353574°N 122.956696°W

Links
- Webcast: Listen live
- Website: www.cbc.ca/news/canada/british-columbia

CBU-FM (105.7 MHz) is a non-commercial public radio station in Vancouver, British Columbia. It is owned by the Canadian Broadcasting Corporation and it carries its CBC Music network. The studios and offices are in the CBC Regional Broadcast Centre at 700 Hamilton Street in Downtown Vancouver.

CBU-FM is a Class C station and the oldest FM station in British Columbia. It has an effective radiated power (ERP) of 31,733 watts average (95,800 watts peak). The transmitter tower is atop Mount Seymour in the District of North Vancouver. Broadcast relay stations carry CBU-FM programming around British Columbia, as well as Dawson City, Whitehorse and Yellowknife.

== History ==
The station signed on the air on December 12, 1947, as an FM simulcast of Vancouver's original CBC AM station, which had the call sign CBR. It was rebranded as CBU-FM in 1952 when the Vancouver AM station was renamed. Because it was so far west, it was not part of the CBC's original FM network in 1960. However, by the 1964 relaunch of the CBC FM network, CBU-FM was part of the chain.

As with most CBC Music stations, there is no Vancouver-specific programming on the station apart from short weather updates. However, Saturday Afternoon at the Opera and In Concert, both hosted by Bill Richardson, currently originate from Vancouver for the entire network.

== Rebroadcasters ==
Rebroadcasters of CBU-FM
City of licence	Identifier	Frequency	RECNet	CRTC Decision	Notes
Chilliwack	CBU-FM-7	99.9 FM	Query	2004-403	49°6′34.92″N 121°50′52.80″W
Kamloops	CBU-FM-4	95.3 FM	Query		50°40′14.88″N 120°23′56.40″W
Kelowna	CBU-FM-3	89.7 FM	Query		49°58′0.12″N 119°31′44.40″W
Metchosin-Sooke	CBU-FM-2	105.1 FM	Query	89-557	48°24′7.92″N 123°34′26.40″W
Prince George	CBU-FM-5	90.3 FM	Query	2003-259	53°54′11.88″N 122°42′14.40″W
Quesnel	CBU-FM-6	106.9 FM	Query	2003-466	52°52′55.92″N 122°20′13.20″W
Victoria	CBU-FM-1	92.1 FM	Query	89-557	48°45′56.16″N 123°30′39.60″W

=== Community-owned rebroadcasters ===
City of licence	Identifier	Frequency	RECNet	CRTC Decision	Notes
Fort St. James	VF2101	101.9 FM	Query		54°26′35.88″N 124°13′30″W
Fraser Lake	VF2476	95.1 FM	Query	98-210	54°1′59.88″N 124°37′44.40″W
Houston	CKEH-FM	104.7 FM	Query	97-548	54°26′30.12″N 126°39′32.40″W
Logan Lake	VF2343	89.3 FM	Query	2000-272	50°30′3.96″N 120°48′50.40″W
Riley Creek	VF2098	98.7 FM	Query	99-44	50°36′52.92″N 121°52′48″W
Smithers	CKEW-FM	88.1 FM	Query	92-710	54°46′18.84″N 127°14′2.40″W
Valemount	VF2710	107.5	Query		52°50′30.12″N 119°15′28.80″W

=== Territories ===
City of licence	Identifier	Frequency	Power	Class	RECNet	CRTC Decision	Notes
Dawson City, Yukon	CBDN-FM	104.9 FM	413 watts	A	Query	2007-76	64°3′28.08″N 139°25′1.20″W
Whitehorse, Yukon	CBU-FM-8	104.5 FM	240 watts	B	Query	2004-175	60°39′33.84″N 134°53′2.40″W
Yellowknife, Northwest Territories	CBNY-FM	95.3 FM	114 watts	A1	Query	2005-224	62°26′48.12″N 114°21′36″W

CBU-FM-8 Whitehorse was originally known as CFWH-FM until 2009. CBNY-FM was known as CFYK-FM until June 3, 2013.
