= CBU (AM) =

CBC Radio One station in Vancouver, Canada

- Vancouver, British Columbia; Canada
- Broadcast area: British Columbia South Coast
- Frequency: 690 kHz
- Branding: CBC Radio One

Programming
- Format: Public radio and talk
- Network: CBC Radio One

Ownership
- Owner: Canadian Broadcasting Corporation
- Sister stations: CBU-FM, CBUF-FM, CBUX-FM, CBUT-DT, CBUFT-DT

History
- First air date: 1925
- Former call signs: CNRV (1925–1933); CRCV (1933–1936); CBR (1936–1951)
- Former frequencies: 1100 kHz (1925–1941); 1130 kHz (1941–1952)
- Call sign meaning: Canadian Broadcasting Corporation Vancouver

Technical information
- Licensing authority: CRTC
- Class: B
- Power: 25,000 watts
- Transmitter coordinates: 49.138744°N 123.198774°W
- Repeater: 88.1 CBU-2-FM (Vancouver)

Links
- Webcast: Listen Live
- Website: www.cbc.ca/news/canada/british-columbia

CBU (690 AM) is a Canadian non-commercial radio station licensed to Vancouver, British Columbia. It carries the programming of the CBC Radio One network. 690 AM is a clear channel frequency; the station is additionally relayed over Vancouver rebroadcaster CBU-2-FM (88.1 FM); CBU's newscasts and local shows are also heard on a chain of CBC stations around the Lower Mainland.

CBU's studios and offices are in the CBC Regional Broadcast Centre at 700 Hamilton Street in Downtown Vancouver. The AM transmitter is in the Steveston section of Richmond and the FM transmitter is on Mount Seymour.

== History ==
=== CNRV, CRCV, CBR ===
The station was launched in 1925. The original call sign was CNRV, using the slogan "The Voice of the Pacific." It broadcast on 1100 AM and was owned by the Canadian National Railway radio network. CNRV was acquired by the Canadian Radio Broadcasting Commission in 1933, becoming CRCV. In 1936, the CBC was created, taking over the CRBC's operations, and CRCV became CBR.

The transmitter was located on No. 4 Road in Richmond. This site was in use from 1938 to 1976.

The station moved to 1130 in 1941 after the enactment of the North American Regional Broadcasting Agreement (NARBA). In 1947, an FM simulcast was launched on 105.7 MHz. Distinct programming on the FM station was aired for the first time in 1964 when it joined the "CBC FM Network."

=== CBU ===
The frequency was moved to 690 AM in 1952 when the call sign was changed to its current CBU. In 1967, a new transmitter was erected in Steveston, on the shoreline along the Strait of Georgia. The station began broadcasting at 50,000 watts, the highest power authorized by the Canadian Radio-television and Telecommunications Commission (CRTC), allowing it to be heard throughout the Metro Vancouver Regional District and around the British Columbia Coast.

Among Radio One stations on the AM dial around Canada, CBU covers the largest area of population, since Montreal and Toronto are served by FM stations. CBM Montreal moved to CBME-FM in 1998, and CBL Toronto moved to CBLA-FM in 1999.

=== FM simulcast ===
In early 2008, the CRTC approved CBU's application for a new simulcast of its programming on the FM band. On October 10, 2008, CBU began testing its FM simulcast on 88.1 FM as CBU-2-FM with an effective radiated power of 19,500 watts, and it officially signed on soon after. Around the same time, the CBC also applied to broadcast on separate transmitters into Nanaimo, as well as the Sunshine Coast, with the intent to shut down the AM transmitter on 690 kHz if approved. The CRTC denied these other two transmitters due to the lack of available frequencies in the region.

In 2011, the CBC applied to the CRTC to increase the coverage area of CBU-2-FM's transmitter. The CBC proposed increasing the height of the antenna and raising the ERP to 36,900 watts (97,600 watts maximum). The ability to increase the signal coverage area was made possible when CHEK-DT in Victoria moved from VHF TV channel 6 to 49, as part of the over-the-air digital television transition. (TV channel 6 is heard on the FM band at 87.75, which puts it close on the dial to 88.1, the frequency for CBU-2-FM.) This CBC transmitter application was approved September 13, 2012.

=== Fire damages AM transmitter ===
In November 2018, CBU reduced its AM transmitter power from 50,000 to 25,000 watts. A fire at the Steveston transmitting facilities destroyed part of the station’s equipment in 2017. It was decided repairs to restore the full 50,000 watts would have been too costly.

=== HD Radio ===
CBU-2-FM transmits using HD Radio technology on 88.1 MHz. As of April 2022, this signal provides simulcasts of CBU-FM on digital subchannel HD2 and CBCV-FM on subchannel HD3.

== Shortwave relay ==
In 1941, CBR established a shortwave relay for remote areas of British Columbia using the call sign CBRX and operating on a frequency of 6.16 MHz (in the 49m band) with a power of 150 watts. The call sign changed to CBUX in 1952 when the AM station became CBU.

In 1965, the call sign changed to CKZU, recognizing that the ITU prefix CB was not assigned to Canada, but to Chile. The station was given permission to increase its power to 1,000 watts in 1986. The transmitter was adjacent to CBU's AM transmitter. The 2017 fire that destroyed part of the AM transmitter also damaged the shortwave broadcasting equipment.

In February 2017, the CBC announced that CKZU was unlikely to return to shortwave. The CBC stated that the transmitter was in a state of disrepair with no replacement parts available due to aging equipment. Purchasing a new transmitter would be too costly due to the minimal number of listeners who tune into the facility.

== Local programming ==
CBU's local programs are The Early Edition, hosted by Stephen Quinn, in the morning; and On the Coast, hosted by Gloria Macarenko, in the afternoon.

CBU also originates the lunch-hour show BC Today, hosted by Michelle Eliot and simulcast over CBUT-DT, as well as the weekend programs North By Northwest, hosted by Margaret Gallagher, in the morning; and Hot Air on Saturday afternoons. These shows (except for The Early Edition and On the Coast) are broadcast province-wide to Radio One's stations in Victoria, Kelowna, Kamloops, Prince Rupert and Prince George, as well as their respective rebroadcasters.

== Transmitters ==
Rebroadcasters of CBU
| City of licence | Identifier | Frequency | Power | Class | RECNet | CRTC Decision | Notes |
|---|---|---|---|---|---|---|---|
| Abbotsford | CBU-1-FM | 88.5 FM | 7400 watts | B1 | Query | 2007-348 2010-298 | 49°3′8″N 122°14′58″W |
| Chilliwack | CBYF-FM | 91.7 FM | 500 watts | A | Query | | 49°6′35″N 121°50′52″W |
| Harrison Hot Springs | CBYH-FM | 96.7 FM | 90 watts | A1 | Query | | 49°17′37″N 121°46′40″W |
| Hope | CBUE-FM | 101.7 FM | 105 watts | A1 | Query | | 49°23′14″N 121°25′21″W |
| Pemberton | CBU-3-FM | 91.5 FM | 262 watts | A | Query | | 50°19′39″N 122°49′20″W |
| Squamish | CBRU-FM | 98.3 FM | 3,000 watts | A | Query | 84-282 2006-275 2002-432 | 49°46′24″N 123°7′44″W |
| Vancouver | CBU-2-FM | 88.1 FM | 99,432 watts | C | Query | | 49°21′13″N 122°57′25″W |
| Whistler | CBYW-FM | 100.1 FM | 500 watts | A | Query | | 50°4′45″N 123°1′4″W |

CBU's signal on 690 AM also can be heard in Nanaimo and Gibsons.

== Notable staff ==
- Gloria Macarenko, host of weekday afternoon program On the Coast
- Anne Petrie, former host of CBU radio program 3's Company
