= The Story from Here =

The Story from Here is a Canadian radio program on CBC Radio One, which presents a weekly compilation of human interest stories and interviews from the network's various local and regional programs. The program's production location and host formerly rotated every few months to one of the local stations, but as of 2014 the program is permanently produced in Vancouver and hosted by Gloria Macarenko.
