= CBUF-FM =

Public radio station in Vancouver, Canada

- Vancouver, British Columbia; Canada
- Broadcast area: British Columbia; Whitehorse, Yukon
- Frequency: 97.7 MHz
- Branding: Ici Radio-Canada Première

Programming
- Format: Public radio and talk

Ownership
- Owner: Canadian Broadcasting Corporation
- Sister stations: CBU, CBUX-FM, CBU-FM, CBUT-DT, CBUFT-DT

History
- First air date: December 1, 1967
- Call sign meaning: Canadian Broadcasting Corporation Vancouver (U) French

Technical information
- Licensing authority: CRTC
- Class: C
- ERP: 29,000 watts; (95,800 watts maximum)
- HAAT: 610 metres (2,000 ft)
- Transmitter coordinates: 49.353574°N 122.956696°W

Links
- Website: ici.radio-canada.ca/ohdio/premiere

CBUF-FM (97.7 MHz) is a French-language non-commercial public radio station in Vancouver, British Columbia. It broadcasts Radio-Canada's Ici Radio-Canada Première network around Greater Vancouver and on a chain of rebroadcasters around British Columbia. CBUF-FM carries news and talk shows with some music programming.

It signed on the air on December 1, 1967; CBUF-FM was the first French-language Radio-Canada station west of Ontario. Its studios and offices are in the CBC Regional Broadcast Centre on Hamilton Street in Downtown Vancouver, while its transmitter tower is atop Mount Seymour.

CBUF also serves as the Première outlet for the Yukon, by way of a locally owned repeater in Whitehorse.

== Programming ==
The station's current local programs are Phare Ouest, weekday mornings from 6 a.m. to 9 a.m. and Boulevard du Pacifique weekday afternoons, 3:30 p.m. to 6 p.m. CBUF-FM also produces the Saturday morning program, Culture et confiture from 7 a.m. to 11 a.m.

On holidays, CKSB-10-FM produces holiday morning program for western Canada, Les matins de l'Ouest. Le retour de l'Ouest produced by Alberta's CHFA-FM, replaces regional drive programming on Première outlets in western Canada. During summer months, CBUF-FM produces Le monde chez nous a documentary series that is heard on Saturday mornings from 10 a.m. to 11 a.m.

== Transmitters ==
Rebroadcasters of CBUF-FM
City of licence	Identifier	Frequency	Power	Class	RECNet	CRTC Decision	Notes
Chilliwack	CBUF-FM-1	102.1	81 watts	A	Query		49°6′34.92″N 121°50′52.80″W
Dawson Creek	CBUF-FM-7	93.7	70 watts	A1	Query		55°46′58.08″N 120°12′50.40″W
Kamloops	CBUF-FM-6	96.5	4,750 watts	B	Query		50°40′14.88″N 120°23′56.40″W
Kelowna	CBUF-FM-2	90.5	2,700 watts	B	Query		49°58′0.12″N 119°31′44.40″W
Kitimat	CBUF-FM-5	105.1	285 watts	A	Query		54°3′14.04″N 128°38′6″W
Port Alberni	CBUF-FM-8	94.9	348 watts	A	Query		49°14′27.96″N 124°47′9.60″W
Prince George	CBUF-FM-4	95.5	130 watts	A1	Query		53°54′11.88″N 122°42′14.40″W
Terrace	CBUF-FM-3	96.9	225 watts	B	Query		54°31′4.08″N 128°28′22.80″W
Victoria	CBUF-FM-9	99.7	1,200 watts	A	Query	2003-147	48°30′19.08″N 123°28′26.40″W
Whistler	CBUF-FM-10	103.1	500 watts	A	Query	2008-17	50°4′44.04″N 123°0′54″W
Whitehorse, Yukon	CFWY-FM	102.1	200 watts	B	Query	2003-534	60°39′33.84″N 134°53′2.40″W; Owned by Association Franco-Yukonnaise
