= CBC Regional Broadcast Centre Vancouver =

Canadian media production facility

CBC Regional Broadcast Centre
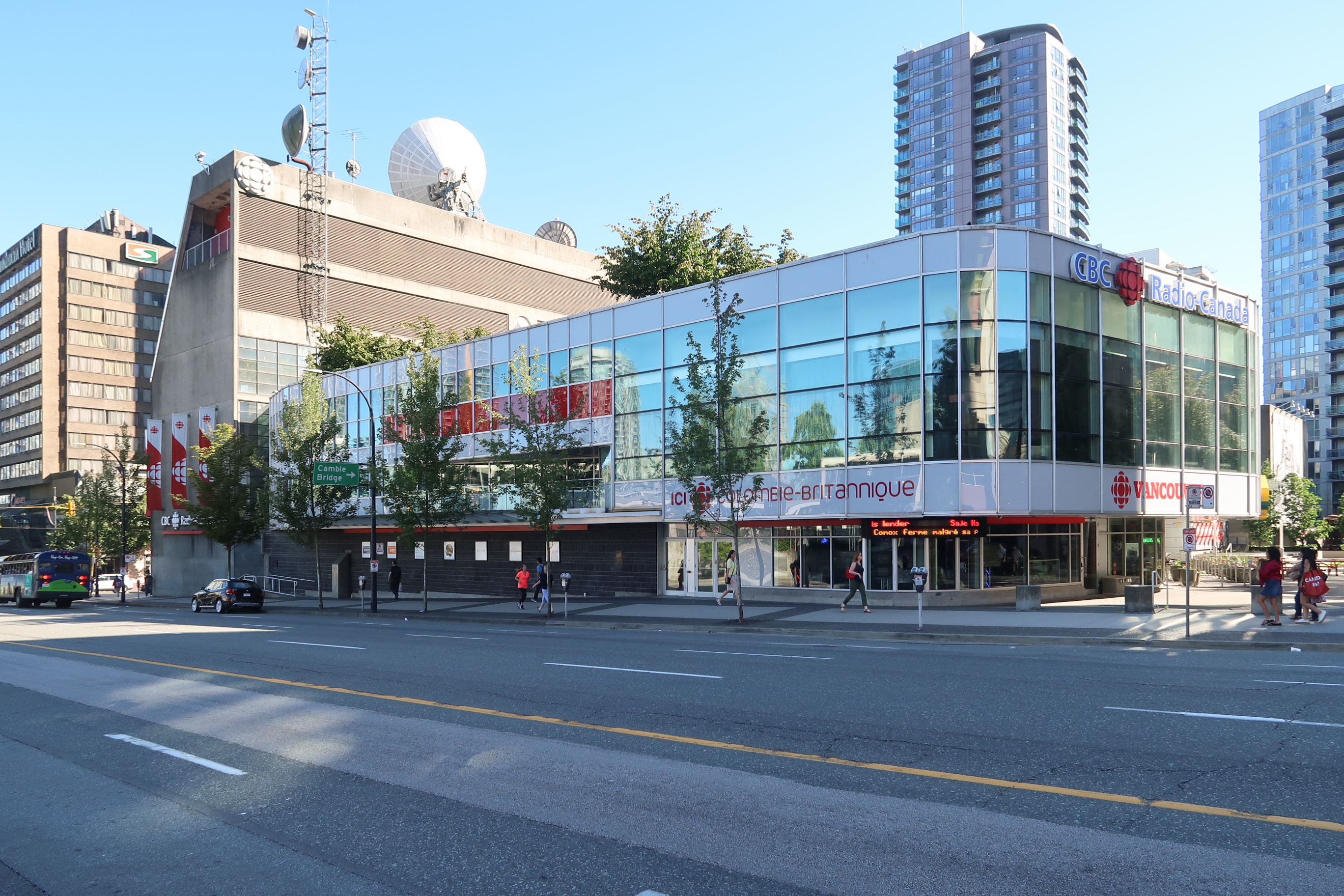
- Broadcast Centre in 2018
- Alternative names: Vancouver Broadcast Centre

General information
- Status: Completed
- Type: Production centre
- Location: 700 Hamilton Street; Vancouver, British Columbia; V6B 2R5
- Coordinates: 49.27912°N 123.11452°W
- Current tenants: Vancouver International Jazz Festival; Vancouver International Children's Festival; Vancouver Folk Music Festival
- Completed: 1975
- Renovated: 2009
- Owner: Canadian Broadcasting Corporation

Design and construction
- Architect: Paul Merrick
- Architecture firm: Merrick Architecture

Website
- www.cbc.ca/productionfacilities/m_vancouver

The CBC Regional Broadcast Centre, also known as the Vancouver Broadcast Centre, is an office and studio complex located in Vancouver, British Columbia, Canada. The centre houses the Canadian Broadcasting Corporation's radio and television facilities for the city. It is the second largest CBC production facility in English Canada, the third-largest at CBC, and the fourth-largest overall, after Toronto's Canadian Broadcasting Centre, Ottawa’s CBC Ottawa Production Centre and Montreal's Maison Radio-Canada. The building was designed by Paul Merrick for Merrick Architecture and built in 1975.

The building underwent significant renovations starting in 2006, which were completed in 2009. The expanded facility included community space to house the offices of the Vancouver International Jazz Festival, the Vancouver International Children's Festival and the Vancouver Folk Music Festival, as well as a 4,000-square-foot (370 m^{2}) performance studio similar to Toronto's Glenn Gould Studio.

In addition to Vancouver's local CBC broadcast stations (CBU, CBU-FM, CBUF-FM, CBUX-FM, CBUT-DT, CBUFT-DT), the national satellite radio network CBC Radio 3 operates from the Vancouver building. It also serves as one of the originating studios for the nightly national newscast The National.
