= CBUX-FM =

Ici Musique station in Vancouver, Canada

- Vancouver, British Columbia; Canada
- Broadcast area: Greater Vancouver; Greater Victoria
- Frequency: 90.9 MHz
- Branding: Ici Musique

Programming
- Language: French
- Format: Adult album alternative, Public Music

Ownership
- Owner: Canadian Broadcasting Corporation
- Sister stations: CBU, CBU-FM, CBUF-FM, CBUT-DT, CBUFT-DT

History
- First air date: September 5, 2002
- Call sign meaning: Canadian Broadcasting Corporation Vancouver (U)

Technical information
- Licensing authority: CRTC
- Class: C1
- ERP: 1,280 watts; 2,790 watts maximum
- HAAT: 567.2 metres (1,861 ft)
- Transmitter coordinates: 49.353574°N 122.956696°W

Links
- Website: ICI Musique

CBUX-FM (90.9 MHz) is a non-commercial French-language radio station, which broadcasts the SRC's Ici Musique network in Vancouver, British Columbia. It plays a mix of Adult Album Alternative, Jazz and Classical music with news updates.

The station broadcasts from the CBC Regional Broadcast Centre on Hamilton Street in Downtown Vancouver, while its transmitter is atop Mount Seymour in the District of North Vancouver. It also has a rebroadcaster on 88.9 FM in Victoria, British Columbia, which has the call sign CBUX-FM-1.

== History ==
The station signed on the air on September 5, 2002, at first carrying the Radio-Canada FM network live, even though Vancouver is three time zones away from Montreal.

In fall 2010, Espace musique stations in Western Canada began to air the network schedule on tape delay as appropriate for their respective time zones, in line with Radio-Canada's other terrestrial networks. Hence network programs now air on CBUX three hours after they air on Ici Musique stations in Quebec, Ontario and Atlantic Canada. Much of the daytime programming was devolved to local stations. On CBUX, Monique Polloni hosted from 9:00 a.m. to noon, followed by Célyne Gagnon until 3:00 p.m.

In addition, André Rhéaume hosts a world music program originating from CBUX which airs across the network on Wednesday and Thursday nights, from 10:00 p.m. to 1:00 a.m. local time.

Prior to fall 2010, all Espace Musique stations carried the entire network schedule without any recorded delays for time zone differences. During this era, CBUX was a partial exception: Rhéaume's program, which at the time was a two-hour jazz program which aired Monday-Thursday at 5:00 p.m. local time, followed by concerts at 7:00. This was the reverse of the order on most stations (concerts at 8:00 ET, jazz at 10:00 ET).

During the 2010 Winter Olympics, CBUX broke away from the national Espace musique schedule to broadcast a special radio service titled la radio culturelle, focusing on various cultural aspects of the games for French-language listeners.

== Transmitters ==
Rebroadcasters of CBUX-FM
City of licence	Identifier	Frequency	Power	Class	RECNet	CRTC Decision	Notes
Victoria	CBUX-FM-1	88.9 FM	6,700 watts	C1	Query	2002-339	48°35′39.84″N 123°32′42″W
