= List of radio stations in Prince Edward Island =

The following is a list of radio stations in the Canadian province of Prince Edward Island, as of 2024.

Call sign	Frequency	City of Licence	Owner	Format
CIRB-FM	93.9 FM	Borden	Information Radio/Strait Crossing Bridge Limited	tourist information
CBAF-FM-15	88.1 FM	Charlottetown	Ici Radio-Canada Première	public news/talk (French)
CBAX-FM-1	88.9 FM	Charlottetown	Ici Musique	public music (French)
CIOG-FM	91.3 FM	Charlottetown	International Harvesters for Christ Evangelistic Association	Christian radio
CHLQ-FM	93.1 FM	Charlottetown	Maritime Broadcasting System	classic rock
CFCY-FM	95.1 FM	Charlottetown	Maritime Broadcasting System	country
CBCT-FM	96.1 FM	Charlottetown	CBC Radio One	public news/talk
CHTN-FM	100.3 FM	Charlottetown	Stingray Digital	Classic hits
CBCH-FM	104.7 FM	Charlottetown	CBC Music	public music
CKQK-FM	105.5 FM	Charlottetown	Stingray Digital	contemporary hit radio
CBCT-FM-2	92.3 FM	Elmira	CBC Radio One	public news/talk
CHTN-FM-1	99.9 FM	Elmira	Stingray Digital	Classic hits
CKQK-FM-1	103.7 FM	Elmira	Stingray Digital	contemporary hit radio
CBPP	1490 AM	Prince Edward Island National Park	CBC/Parks Canada	tourist/park information
CBPP-1	1280 AM	Prince Edward Island National Park	CBC/Parks Canada	tourist/park information
CHTN-FM-2	89.9 FM	St. Edward	Stingray Digital	Classic hits
CKQK-FM-2	91.1 FM	St. Edward	Stingray Digital	contemporary hit radio
CBAF-FM-20	97.5 FM	St. Edward	Ici Radio-Canada Première	public news/talk (French)
CBCT-FM-1	101.1 FM	St. Edward	CBC Radio One	public news/talk
CIOG-FM-1	92.5 FM	Summerside	International Harvesters for Christ Evangelistic Association	Christian radio
CJRW-FM	102.1 FM	Summerside	Maritime Broadcasting System	Adult contemporary
CBAF-FM-19	106.9 FM	Urbainville	Ici Radio-Canada Première	public news/talk (French)

== See also ==
- Lists of radio stations in North and Central America
