= Media in Charlottetown =

This is a list of media in Charlottetown, Prince Edward Island, Canada.

== Radio ==
Frequency	Call sign	Branding	Format	Owner	Notes
FM 88.1	CBAF-FM-15	Ici Radio-Canada Première	news/talk	Canadian Broadcasting Corporation	French
FM 88.9	CBAX-FM-1	Ici Musique	public music	Canadian Broadcasting Corporation	French
FM 90.3	CIMN-FM		campus radio	University of Prince Edward Island	not currently broadcasting
FM 91.3	CIOG-FM		Christian radio	International Harvesters for Christ Evangelistic Association	
FM 93.1	CHLQ-FM	Max 93.1	mainstream rock	Maritime Broadcasting System	
FM 95.1	CFCY-FM	95.1 CFCY	country music	Maritime Broadcasting System	
FM 96.1	CBCT-FM	CBC Radio One	news/talk	Canadian Broadcasting Corporation	
FM 100.3	CHTN-FM	Ocean 100	classic hits	Stingray Radio	
FM 104.7	CBCH-FM	CBC Music	public music	Canadian Broadcasting Corporation	
FM 105.5	CKQK-FM	HOT 105.5	contemporary hit radio	Stingray Radio	

== Television ==
OTA virtual channel (PSIP)	OTA actual channel	EastLink Cable	Call sign	Network	Notes
8.1	8 (VHF)	9	CKCW-DT-1	CTV	Rebroadcaster of CKCW-DT (Moncton, NB)
13.1	13 (VHF)	11	CBCT-DT	CBC Television	
42.1	42 (UHF)	6	CHNB-DT-14	Global	Rebroadcaster of CHNB-DT (Saint John, NB)

== Newspapers and magazines ==
- The Guardian - daily
- The Northern Star (Queens County community newspaper)
- The Buzz (province-wide independent arts/entertainment)
- The Cadre (UPEI student paper)
- The Surveyor (Holland College student paper)
- The Eastern Graphic (Kings County weekly newspaper)
- PEI Living Magazine (province-wide independent glossy lifestyle magazine)
