= Churchill, Prince Edward Island =

Community in Prince Edward Island, Canada

Coordinates: 46°13′0.4″N 63°20′7.9″W

Churchill is a community in the Canadian province of Prince Edward Island. The community was named for Winston Churchill. It is located in the township of Lot 65, Queens County immediately west of New Haven.

Churchill is located in the Bonshaw Hills, a high land in the centre of the province. Strathgartney Hill separates the community from Bonshaw to the west.

== Transmitters ==
The Strathgartney Hill is the location of several radio and television broadcasters, which serve the portion of central Prince Edward Island that includes Charlottetown and Summerside.

These are mounted on the province's largest transmitting tower, which is owned by the Canadian Broadcasting Corporation and include:

Public television

- CBC Television's CBCT
- SRC's CBAFT

Public radio

- CBC Radio One's CBCT-FM
- CBC Radio 2's CBH-FM
- Première Chaîne's CBAF-FM-15
- Espace musique's CBAX-FM

Commercial radio (as of 2006)

- CKQK-FM
- CHTN-FM
