= CBC Halifax =

CBC Halifax refers to:

- CBHA-FM, CBC Radio One on 90.5 FM
- CBH-FM, CBC Radio 2 on 102.7 FM
- CBHT-DT, CBC Television on channel 3

SRC Halifax refers to:

- CBAF-FM-5, Première Chaîne on 92.3 FM
- CBAX-FM, Espace musique on 91.5 FM
- CBHFT, Télévision de Radio-Canada on channel 13, rebroadcaster of CBAFT
