= CBC Moncton =

CBC Moncton refers to:

- CBAM-FM, CBC Radio One on 106.1 FM
- CBA-FM, CBC Radio 2 on 95.5 FM, rebroadcasts CBH-FM
- CBAT-TV-2, CBC Television on channel 7, rebroadcasts CBAT-TV

SRC Moncton refers to:

- CBAF-FM, Ici Radio-Canada Première on 88.5 FM
- CBAL-FM, Ici Musique on 98.3 FM
- CBAFT-DT, Ici Radio-Canada Télé on channel 11
