= CBC St. John's =

CBC St. John's refers to:

- CBN, CBC Radio One on 640 AM
- CBN-FM, CBC Radio 2 on 106.9 FM
- CBNT, CBC Television on channel 8

SRC Saint-Jean refers to:

- CBAF-FM-17, Première Chaîne on 105.9 FM, rebroadcasts CBAF-FM
- CBAX-FM-2, Espace Musique on 101.9 FM, rebroadcasts CBAX-FM
- CBFJ-TV, Télévision de Radio-Canada on channel 4, rebroadcasts CBAFT
