= CFCY =

CFCY may refer to:

- CFCY-FM, a radio station (95.1 FM) licensed to Charlottetown, Prince Edward Island, Canada
- CBCT (TV), a television station (channel 13) licensed to Charlottetown, Prince Edward Island, Canada, which held the call sign CFCY-TV from 1956 to 1968
