= CBCT =

CBCT may refer to:

- Cone beam computed tomography
  - Helical cone beam computed tomography
- Broadcasting stations:
  - CBCT-DT, a television station (channel 13) licensed to Charlottetown, Prince Edward Island, Canada
  - CBCT-FM, a radio station (96.1 FM) licensed to Charlottetown, Prince Edward Island, Canada
