= Information Morning =

CBC Radio One program for mainland Nova Scotia

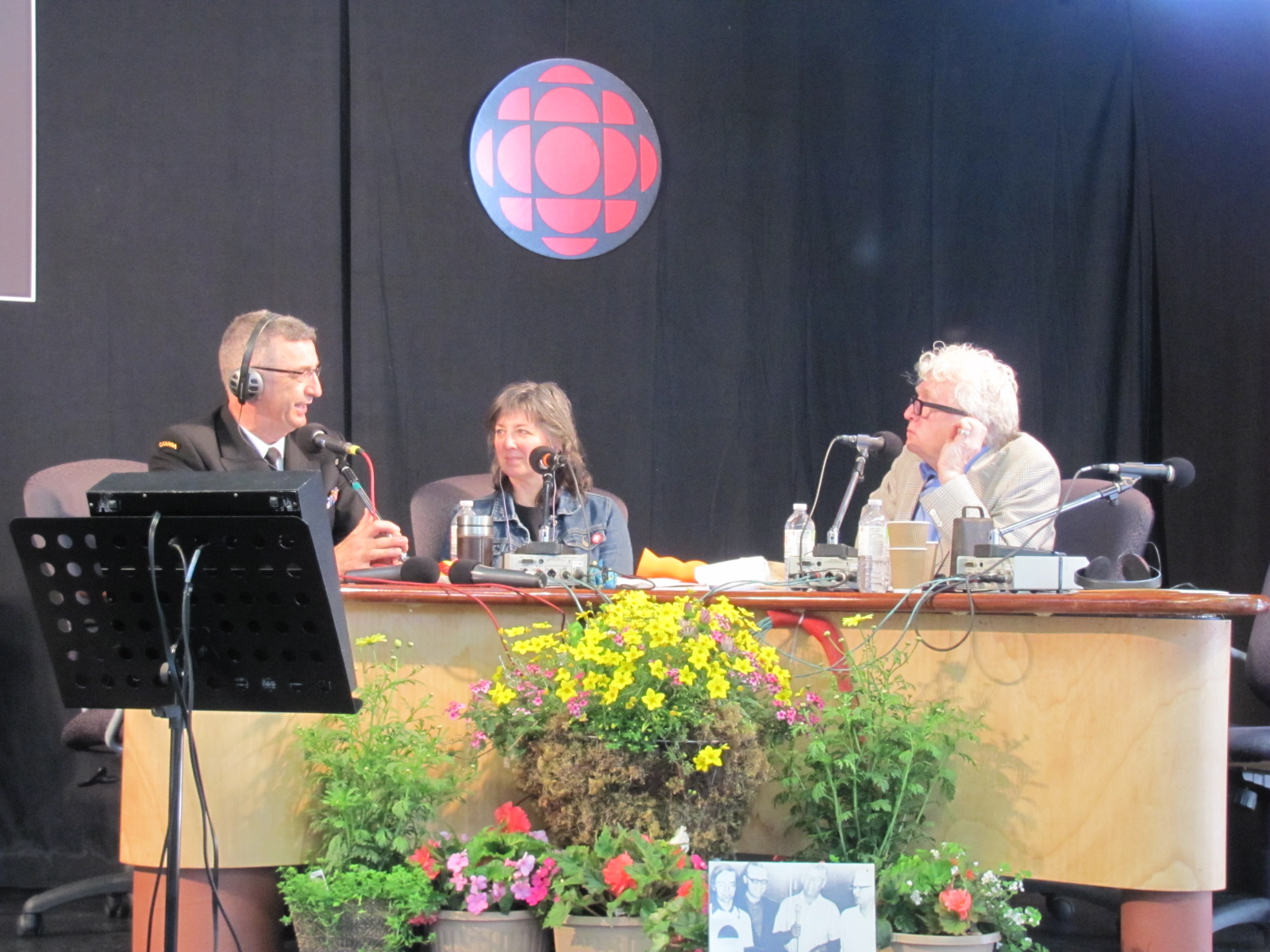
- Genre: Current Affairs
- Running time: 157 min. weekdays, 6:00-8:37 A.M.
- Country of origin: Canada
- Home station: CBHA-FM
- Hosted by: Portia Clark and Louise Renault
- Original release: June 1, 1970 – present
- Website: www.cbc.ca/informationmorningns
- Podcast: www.cbc.ca/radio/podcasts/nova-scotia/ns-information-morning/

Information Morning is CBC Radio One's local morning show program for mainland Nova Scotia. It is produced out of the studios of CBHA-FM in Halifax and is simulcast on all CBC Radio One transmitters on mainland Nova Scotia.

== History ==
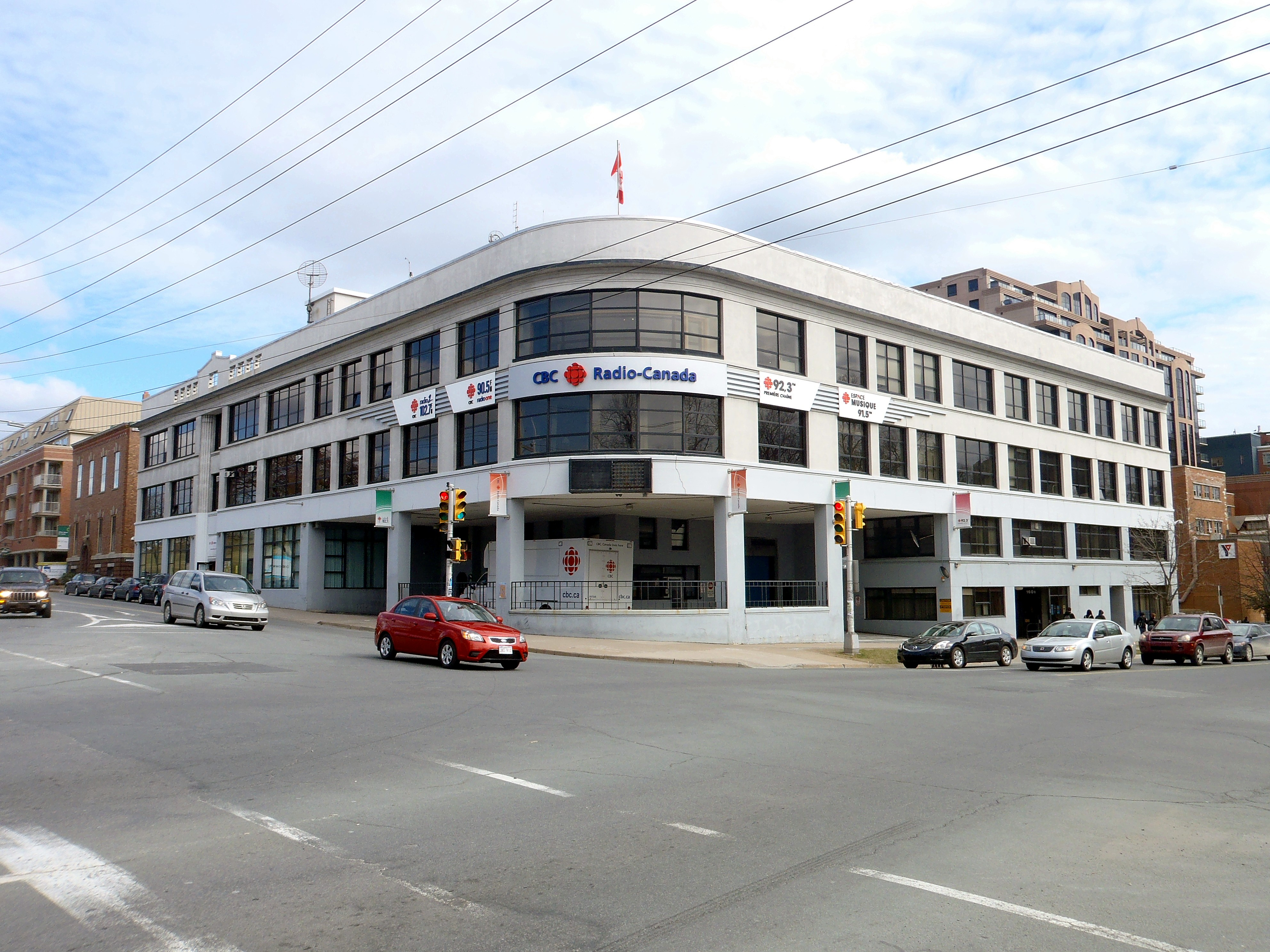
The Halifax CBC Radio Building, home to Information Morning from 1970 to 2014

Information Morning was first broadcast on June 1, 1970. The original format of the morning current affairs show was a "fast-paced, tightly made omnibus of news, weather, commentary, reviews and interviews," with the rumble of a distant teletype in the background. The Dartmouth Free Press's Stefan Haley called it well-done, intense and "hell on a hangover." It was part of the "Radio Revolution" at CBC Radio which started in the late 1960s as the CBC sought more ambitious, live coverage of news and current affairs including listeners as well as experts, on shows such as As It Happens. This change was embraced by CBC regional morning shows which developed three hours of live radio combining "survival information", about news, weather and traffic, with interviews and documentaries about local and national issues. Information Morning was the second regional CBC show in Canada to launch the new morning format, after CBC Winnipeg. The show tripled CBC Radio's morning audience in Halifax in one year going from seven per cent to 20 per cent and attracted coverage in Time magazine. The first Information Morning host was Bob Oxley; with news by Frank Cameron and Brian Bullock; sports by George Young; and weather by Reid Dexter. In 1971, Don "Trigger" Tremaine became a host with Gerry Fogarty as sportscaster. In 1976 Don Connolly joined Don Tremaine as co-host, establishing a popular era of serious interviews balanced with "kitchen table" banter known to some as the "Two Dons". Don Tremaine retired in 1987 and was replaced by Joan Melanson. Elizabeth Logan served as co-host from 1991 to 2010. The show broadcast from the historic art deco Halifax CBC Radio Building until 2014 when the building was sold to a developer for demolition and the show moved to the new CBC Nova Scotia studios on 7067 Chebucto Road.

== Ratings ==
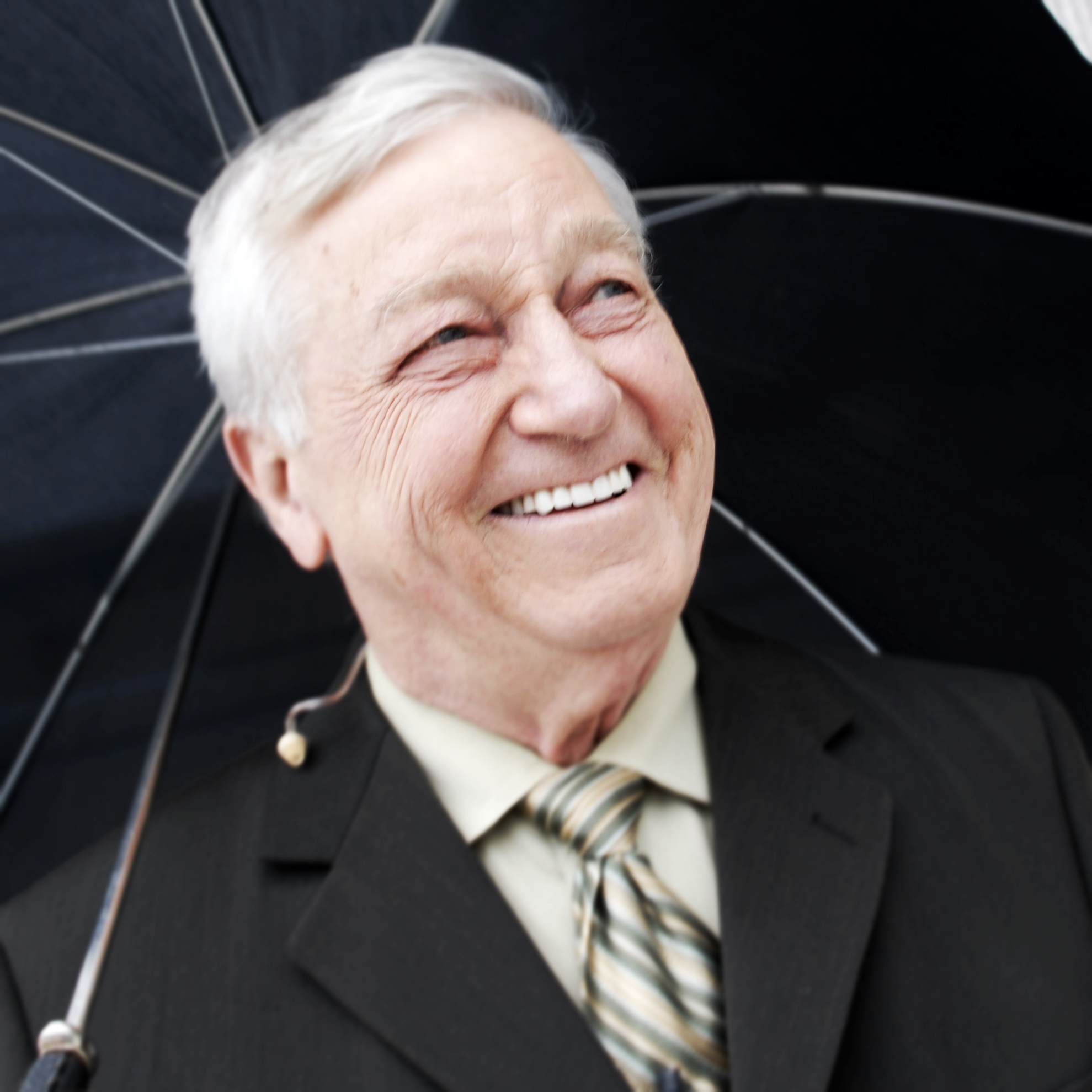
The show featured long-time weatherman Peter Coade until 2016

Information Morning has often enjoyed the largest morning radio audience in Nova Scotia, although the show's ratings dipped to 2nd and third place in the 1980s in the wake of host changes and a national strike at CBC Radio in 1981. However, the show climbed back to No. 1 in the overall Halifax radio audience by 1990 and has been at the top of the ratings across most parts of the province while remaining the number one morning show in Halifax.

== Current format ==
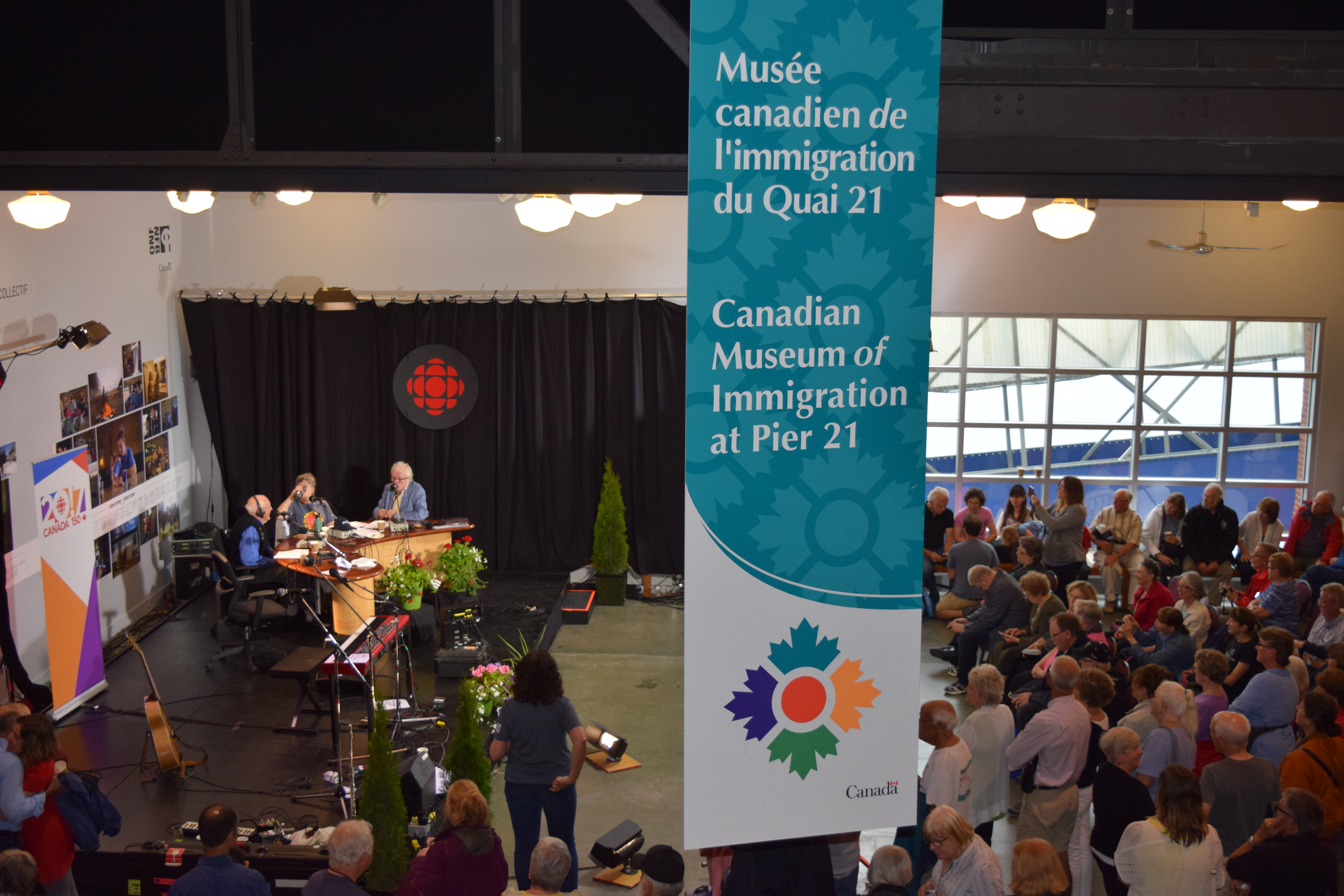
Information Morning birthday show special broadcast at the Canadian Museum of Immigration at Pier 21, 2017

Information Morning is broadcast live from 6:00 am to 8:37 am. Interviews are mixed with the national CBC Radio News on the hour and local news on the half-hour along with weather and sports. The show regularly goes on the road to broadcast from location at communities around Nova Scotia. Information Morning did a pioneering location broadcast on September 11, 2014, when the show was broadcast from the remote Sable Island, the first live radio broadcast from the island famous for its shipwrecks and wild horses. The show also conducts an annual fundraising campaign for the Feed Nova Scotia food bank through the "Share the View" art calendar. On June 2, 1975, Information Morning began an annual tradition of a public "birthday show" at the Halifax waterfront which usually attracts a large live audience. The 16th Birthday party was held at the Halifax Sheraton. The show currently features co-hosts Portia Clark and Louise Renault, with sportscaster John Hancock and meteorologist Brennan Allen, who in December 2016 replaced Peter Coade who retired in September. Allen left in December 2017 to work for Environment Canada, and was eventually replaced by meteorologist Tina Simpkin on January 2, 2019. On November 20, 2017, Don Connolly announced that he would retire, ending 42 years with a last show on January 26, 2018. Nova Scotia native Portia Clark, a former co-host of Edmonton AM, became the new host in April, 2018. In August 2020, long time culture reporter Tara Thorne was fired for a tweet concerning the Liberal Premier's family (and a personal opinion) on her personal Twitter account.

== Information Morning in other areas ==
The Information Morning name is also used for morning programs on CBC Radio One outlets in CBI Sydney, CBZF-FM Fredericton, CBAM-FM Moncton and Saint John CBD-FM. However, despite the usage of the same name in these cities, the actual programming is locally produced in each region, and not related to Information Morning in Halifax.

== See also ==
- Maritime Noon
