= CBCT-FM =

CBC Radio One station on Prince Edward Island

- Charlottetown, Prince Edward Island; Canada
- Broadcast area: Prince Edward Island
- Frequency: 96.1 MHz

Programming
- Format: Public Radio - News - Talk
- Network: CBC Radio One

Ownership
- Owner: Canadian Broadcasting Corporation
- Sister stations: CBAF-FM-15, CBAX-FM-1, CBCH-FM, CBCT-DT

History
- First air date: 1977
- Former frequencies: 96.9 MHz (1977–1985)
- Call sign meaning: Canadian Broadcasting Corporation Charlottetown

Technical information
- Class: C
- ERP: 100,000 watts
- HAAT: 239 metres (784 ft)

Links
- Website: CBC Prince Edward Island

CBCT-FM (96.1 MHz) is a Canadian non-commercial public radio station airing a news-talk radio format. It is the CBC Radio One station for all of Prince Edward Island, with studios and offices on University Avenue in Charlottetown.

CBCT-FM has an effective radiated power (ERP) of 100,000 watts, the maximum for most Canadian FM stations. The transmitter is on a CBC-owned tower on Strathgartney Hill near Prince Edward Island Route 1 in Churchill, about 15 kilometres (9.3 mi) west of Charlottetown. Repeater stations are in Elmira and St. Edward.

== Programming ==
Two local programs are produced by CBCT-FM on weekday morning and afternoon drive times. Island Morning with Mitch Cormier is the wake-up show and Mainstreet with Steve Bruce is heard on the drive home. At 12 p.m. on weekdays, Maritime Noon airs from CBHA-FM Halifax, and heard on all CBC Radio One stations in Nova Scotia, New Brunswick and Prince Edward Island. On Saturday and Sunday, Bill Roach at CBHA-FM hosts Weekend Mornings.

== History ==
CBCT-FM was launched in 1977 on 96.9 MHz. Prior to its launch, CBC Radio programming aired on private affiliate CFCY (630 AM), as well as a repeater of CBA Moncton that broadcast at low power on 103.1 FM. In 1985, CBCT-FM's frequency was changed to 96.1.

While most CBC Radio One stations trace their histories to an AM radio station, CBCT-FM has always broadcast on the FM band in Charlottetown.

== Transmitters ==
Rebroadcasters of CBCT-FM
City of licence	Identifier	Frequency	Power	Class	RECNet	Notes
Elmira	CBCT-FM-2	92.3 FM	3150 watts	A	Query	46°25′24.96″N 62°5′26.88″W
St. Edward	CBCT-FM-1	101.1 FM	6500 watts	B1	Query	46°53′34.08″N 64°8′53.16″W
