= Journey Into Melody =

- Genre: Music
- Country of origin: Canada
- Original language: English
- No. of seasons: 1
- No. of episodes: 5

Production
- Production location: Halifax

Original release
- Network: CBC Television
- Release: 1 June – 29 June 1958

Journey Into Melody is a Canadian music television miniseries that aired on CBC Television in 1958.

== Premise ==
The music series was broadcast live from CBC's Halifax studios. It featured singer Bernard Johnson in the role of a travel clerk who dreams of visiting other places and times. For example, the second episode featured selected songs of Vienna at the beginning of the 20th century.

Series regulars included the Armadale Chorus and a 24-member orchestra led by Gordon MacPherson. Dance routines featured on the series were choreographed by Gunter Buchta.

== Scheduling ==
This half-hour series was broadcast Sundays at 5:30 p.m. from 1 to 29 June 1958.
