= CBPP =

CBPP may refer to:

- CBPP, a radio station in Prince Edward Island, Canada
- Contagious bovine pleuropneumonia, a lung disease
- Commons-based peer production
- Center on Budget and Policy Priorities
- Cholesterol-binding pancreatic proteinase, an enzyme
