= Keith Rogers =

Canadian radio executive (1892–1954)

Keith Sinclair Rogers (1892–1954) was a Canadian radio pioneer and founder of CFCY radio in Charlottetown, Prince Edward Island. Rogers began his radio interest as a boy in his father's home experimenting with wireless devices he had built at age 15. He was active in the local militia and involved with use of wireless devices for military communications as early as 1911.

He had an ongoing affiliation with the #12 Signaling Section currently known as 36 Signal Regiment (Canada), eventually succeeding his father William Keir Rogers as lieutenant colonel, but devoted himself to the development of commercial radio as a viable business entity. He signed on a 10-watt station, 10AS, from his living room in 1924. On August 10, 1925, Rogers was informed that a commercial license had been issued to him (the first commercial license in Eastern Canada) for a station that became CFCY. After achieving success in radio he was preparing to launch television on Prince Edward Island, prior to his death in 1954. His family carried out his plan with the launch of CFCY-TV on July 1, 1956. CFCY-TV which had been a CBC affiliate was sold to the CBC in 1968. Radio station CFCY which had been a locally owned CBC affiliate was sold to the Maritime Broadcasting System in 1969 and operated as a private broadcasting station. CBC establishing a full radio presence on PEI in 1977 with the launch of CBCT-FM.

In 2002 Keith Sinclair Rogers was inducted into the Junior Achievement Prince Edward Island Business Hall of Fame. The citation indicated that, "Rogers was a great leader in the communications and entertainment industries and an important personality in the cultural and economic development of Prince Edward Island."
