= Maritime Noon =

- Country of origin: Canada
- Home station: CBHA-FM
- Hosted by: Bob Murphy
- Original release: 1987

Maritime Noon is CBC Radio One's local noon-hour program for the Maritime provinces (New Brunswick, Nova Scotia and Prince Edward Island). It is produced out of the studios of CBHA-FM in Halifax and is simulcast on all CBC Radio One transmitters in the Maritimes. It originally broadcast from the CBC Radio Building in downtown Halifax, but moved along with the CBC's other Halifax operations to a new studio on Halifax's West End in 2014.

A two-hour version of the show with a different format was hosted by Costas Halavrezos from 1987 to 2010. Various interim hosts filled the slot until 2011, when Norma Lee MacLeod, former anchor at CBHT, was named Halavrezos' permanent successor. McLeod retired in 2018 and was succeeded by current host Bob Murphy, a longtime Atlantic-based CBC reporter.

== See also ==
- Information Morning
