= Sharon Dunn =

Canadian journalist

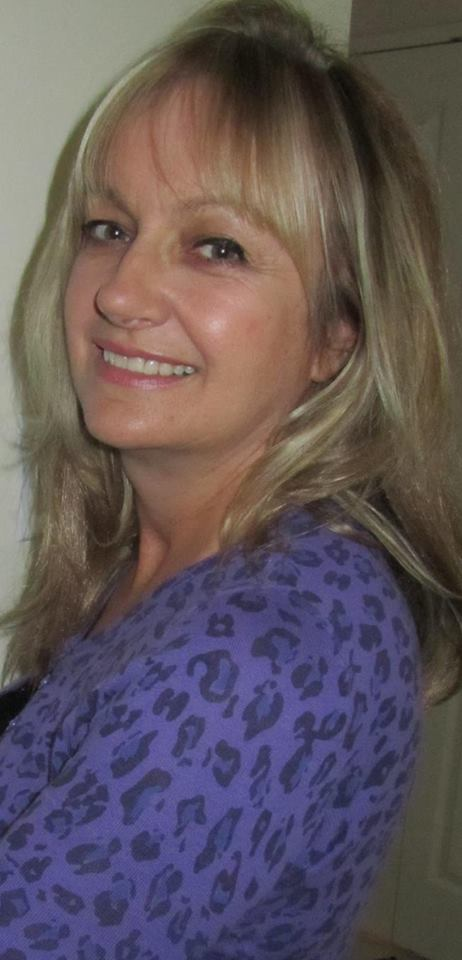
- Education: Dalhousie University
- Occupations: Journalist, writer
- Employer(s): CJCB-TV; CBC Halifax; CBLT (CBC Toronto); National Post
- Known for: Television news anchor; columnist

Sharon Dunn (born in Sydney, Nova Scotia is a Canadian journalist. She began her career at CJCB-TV in Sydney and later moved to Halifax's local CBC TV station to anchor their supper-hour news program. In the early 1980s, she became one of CBC Toronto's main news anchors. After leaving television journalism, she wrote for Maclean's, the National Post and the New York Times.

== Early life and education ==
Dunn was born and raised in Sydney, Nova Scotia, Canada. She attended Holy Angels High school, where she served as President of the Student Council, and received the Birks Medal for Leadership in student affairs, and later graduated from Dalhousie University in Halifax.

== Career ==
Dunn began her broadcasting career at CJCB-TV in Sydney, Nova Scotia, where she worked as a weather presenter. She later joined CBC Halifax as a TV news anchor and subsequently moved to CBLT in Toronto, where she was the anchor of the 6 o'clock CBC TV news program, then called Newshour.

After leaving broadcasting, Dunn worked as a columnist for the National Post and contributed as a freelance writer to various publications, including Modern Love, New York Times as well as NYT Syndication. Her article for Maclean's on non-surgical scoliosis treatment, titled “Amazing Brace,” received attention in public discussions of the subject. In 2024, she wrote a personal essay for the National Post about her breast cancer diagnosis, titled “I Have Breast Cancer. So What?”

== Personal life ==
Dunn was married to racehorse breeder John Sikura until his death in 1994, and they have two sons. At the turn of the century, she was in a relationship with the Ontario premier, Mike Harris. She is currently a writer living in Toronto, Ontario.
