= CJRW-FM =

Radio station in Summerside, Prince Edward Island

Coordinates: 46°20′25″N 63°25′25″W

- Summerside, Prince Edward Island; Canada
- Frequency: 102.1 MHz
- Branding: 102 Spud FM

Programming
- Format: Adult contemporary

Ownership
- Owner: Maritime Broadcasting System
- Sister stations: CFCY-FM, CHLQ-FM

History
- First air date: 1927
- Former call signs: CHGS (1927–1948)
- Former frequencies: 1120 kHz (1927–1934); 1450 kHz (1934–1941); 1480 kHz (1941–1948); 1240 kHz (1948–1999)

Technical information
- Class: B
- ERP: 11,000 watts average 50,000 watts peak Horizontal polarization only
- HAAT: 128.4 metres (421 ft)

Links
- Webcast: Listen Live
- Website: www.spud.fm

CJRW-FM is a Canadian radio station broadcasting at 102.1 FM in Summerside, Prince Edward Island owned & operated by the Maritime Broadcasting System. The station plays an adult contemporary format branded on-air as 102 Spud FM. CJRW is the only radio station in Prince Edward Island that is not being licensed to Charlottetown.

== History ==
The station was launched in 1927 as CHGS originally broadcasting at 1120 on the AM dial. In 1934, the station moved to 1450, then to 1480 in 1941, and then to its final AM frequency at 1240 in 1948. The station also adopted its current call letters at the time.

In November 1999, CJRW officially made its move to the FM band at 102.1 MHz. After the switch to FM, the station became known as C102 with a country format. In 2002, Gulf Broadcasting Company, which was owned by Paul Schuman was sold to the Maritime Broadcasting System.

Originating SPUD logo used from 2007 until the current SPUD 102 used present

In fall 2006, the station changed its format to classic rock as 102.1 Spud FM. In August 2007, the station changed its format to classic hits but kept the same branding. In August 2013, the station changed its format to adult contemporary and re-branded itself as Spud 102 FM.

The station employed local personalities such as Mike Gallant (former city councillor), Dave Peppin, B.J. Arsenault, John Perry, Lowell Huestis, Roger Ahern, Mike Surette and John Burk. Paul M Schurman was a producer, host and announcer in many capacities, including popular Sunday sports show "Sports Round-up". Paul has recently re-joined the station as its imaging voice. CBC network reporter James Murray worked there while he was in high school in the 1980s.

== See also ==
- CFCY-FM
- CHLQ-FM
- CHTN-FM and CKQK-FM - owned by the Stingray Group
