= Saint Pierre and Miquelon La Première (television) =

Saint-Pierre, Saint Pierre and Miquelon; France
- Channels: Digital: 1 (UHF) SPM Telecom (cable): 11 Globaltel (IPTV): 4 Shaw Direct (satellite): 782 Videotron (cable): 50 Cogeco (cable): 203
- Branding: Saint Pierre & Miquelon La Première

Programming
- Affiliations: La Première

Ownership
- Owner: France Télévisions

History
- First air date: April 20, 1967; 58 years ago
- Former affiliations: RFO

Technical information
- Licensing authority: ARCEP

Links
- Website: SPM La Première

Saint Pierre and Miquelon La Première, or SPM La Première (French pronunciation: [sɛ̃-pjɛre-mikəlõ la pʁəmjɛʁ], lit. 'Saint Pierre and Miquelon the First'), is an La Première station in Saint-Pierre, Saint Pierre and Miquelon, France, serving the Saint Pierre and Miquelon archipelago (channel 1, FQN call sign). It is a local French public television channel from France Télévisions. It is also the only local channel in this French overseas territory, as no other channel exists in the archipelago.

In 2020, the channel's total budget is 11.9 million euros and it employs 85.5 full-time staff, including 19 journalists.

The channel has also been available in Canada by satellite via Shaw Direct (channel no. 782) and by cable on the digital cable networks of Videotron (channel no. 50) and Cogeco (channel no. 203) since 1998, despite opposition from the private Quebec network TVA.

As of 10 July 2010, it is no longer available on the Bell Satellite TV satellite package (channel 147), following a unilateral commercial decision.

== History ==
Television was born in Saint-Pierre-et-Miquelon on 20 April 1967, with the first broadcasts by the Office de Radiodiffusion Télévision Française (ORTF). The station's technicians and journalists had to cope with the archipelago's capricious weather conditions, and were given very little resources to do so.

Following the break-up of the ORTF on 31 December 1974, and the creation of the new national program company France Régions 3 (FR3), which controls all regional radio and TV channels, the station became FR3 Saint Pierre and Miquelon on 6 January 1975, and switched to color.

On 31 December 1982, FR3 Saint Pierre and Miquelon changed its name to RFO Saint Pierre and Miquelon, following the creation of the national programming company RFO (Radio Télévision Française d'Outre-Mer) by transferring FR3's overseas activities. Television advertising was authorized on 1 February 1984.

From 1988 to 2010, a second terrestrial television channel, RFO 2, is broadcast. RFO Saint-Pierre-et-Miquelon was then renamed RFO 1. The station was managed by journalist Alain Quintrie from 1989.

Télé Saint Pierre and Miquelon was finally created on 1 February 1999, when RFO was transformed into Réseau France Outre-mer. The channel has a decentralized bureau in Miquelon.

In addition to TV5 Québec Canada, Télé Saint Pierre and Miquelon also enables French television programs to reach North America; the channel also acts as a relay between the French-speaking populations of Newfoundland, Nova Scotia, Quebec and New Brunswick and the French of the archipelago. For this reason, on 20 May 2010, the CBC/Radio-Canada and France Télévisions signed an exchange agreement between the local stations of CBAFT-DT (Radio-Canada Télévision Acadie, branded as ICI Acadie) and RFO Saint-Pierre-et-Miquelon to promote each of the territories of these two very close communities. This partnership is already in place in practice, as Saint Pierre and Miquelon La Première regularly broadcasts Le Téléjournal Acadie on its airwaves, and CBAFT-DT is already present in SPM Telecom's cable channel line-up.

Audiovisual reform law no. 2004-669 of 9 July 2004 integrates the program company Réseau France Outre-mer into the public audiovisual group France Télévisions, to which Télé Saint-Pierre-et-Miquelon now belongs. On 12 October 2010, its chairman, Rémy Pflimlin, announced that Réseau France Outre-mer would be renamed Outre-Mer 1re network to coincide with the launch of DTT in the French overseas territories. All the network's TV channels changed their names on 30 November 2010, when DTT went live, and Télé Saint Pierre and Miquelon became Saint Pierre and Miquelon 1ère. The name change refers to the channel's leading position in its broadcasting territory, as well as its top position on the remote control and its numbering in line with the other France Télévisions Group channels. On 1 January 2018, following a lawsuit by the cable channel Paris Première, owned by Groupe M6, Saint Pierre and Miquelon 1re became Saint Pierre and Miquelon La Première.

Saint-Pierre-et-Miquelon La Première moves to high definition (HD) on satellite on 15 January 2020 and on DTT on 8 September 2020.

On 7 April 2025, in the midst of the second Trump administration's announcement of tariffs on countries that have a trade surplus with the United States, of which Saint-Pierre and Miquelon is the most affected territory in the world along with Lesotho, several English-language newspapers such as Canada's The Globe and Mail and India's The Economic Times speculated that a parody report on the French public television channel Saint-Pierre and Miquelon La Première might be the cause of the trade dispute between the archipelago and the United States. The report, which turned out to be an April Fool's joke, claimed that the French Ministry of Armed Forces had launched a project to build a new military weapons factory to produce CAESAR guns in the archipelago.

== Corporate identity ==
La Première network logo.

The logo of the Office de radiodiffusion-télévision française (ORTF) Saint-Pierre-et-Miquelon is made up of the four letters of the acronym placed horizontally on three ellipses, with the letter "O" at its center forming the fourth ellipse, evoking radio waves, the solar system or the path of an electron in a closed universe, below which is inscribed the word Television. The opening and closing callsigns of ORTF Saint-Pierre-et-Miquelon animate a tangle of ellipses on a starry background, the first arranged to form the channel's logo, the second retracting to form a disappearing star, like an upside-down big bang.

On 6 January 1975, like all FR3 regional stations, FR3 Saint-Pierre-et-Miquelon adopted the new look of the third national channel, whose call sign featured the nine overseas stations and mainland France, with music composed by Francis Lai.

Following its creation on 31 December 1982, the new national program company RFO adopted its own visual identity, highlighting its global dimension in its logo and the technological advance of its satellite broadcasting in its on-air opening. The logo changed again in 1993, taking its tripartite rectangular shape from that of TF1, but adopting three new colors – green for nature, orange for the earth and the sun, and blue for the sea – which would remain the channel's until 2005. On 1 February 1999, with the creation of country channels, Télé Saint-Pierre-et-Miquelon was given a customized look to showcase its landscapes.

On 23 March 2005, like RFO, Télé Saint-Pierre-et-Miquelon adopted the global identity of the France Télévisions group, which it joined in the summer of 2004, using the same color code as the France Ô channel, orange and white, but arranged in two trapezoids. For its transition to DTT on 30 November 2010, the channel was renamed "1re" in reference to its leading position in its broadcasting territory, and adopted the same visual identity as the other France Télévisions Group channels, with a yellow trapezoid referring to the sun in the French overseas territories. The logo was changed again in early 2018.

== Organisation ==
Saint-Pierre-et-Miquelon La Première is the television arm of the Saint-Pierre-et-Miquelon La Première community media center, part of France Télévisions' La Première network.

=== Managers ===
Regional Directors:

- Alain Quintrie: 1989 – ?
- Jean-François Moënnan: ? – 4 September 2005
- Laurence Mayerfeld: 5 September 2005 – 09/2008
- Gérard Christian Hoarau: 09/2008 – 01/2010
- Jean-Jacques Agostini: 02/2010 06/2012
- Yves Rambeau: 08/2012
- Gilles Derouet: 02/2020–

Program Directors:

- Jean-Philippe Lemee: 2003 – 31 January 2005
- Jean-Jacques Agostini
- Gilles Dérouet

Editors-in-chief:

- Albert-Max Briand: 1988 – 1990
- Jacques Barret: 1992 – 1995
- Laurence Mayerfeld
- Gonzague de La Bourdonnaye: 2004–2005
- Muriel Tauzia
- Phillippe Sans: 2023–

=== Budget ===
Saint-Pierre-et-Miquelon La Première has a budget of 7.5 million euros, paid for by France Télévisions, over 90% of which comes from the licence fee and French government contributions to France Télévisions. Like all channels in the public broadcasting group, Saint-Pierre-et-Miquelon La Première is authorized to broadcast advertising between 6 a.m. and 8 pm, from which it also derives part of its resources, capped at 10% so as not to destroy competition.

=== Headquarters ===
Saint-Pierre-et-Miquelon La Première's head office and television and radio studios are located in the Zazpiak building at 14 rue Gloanec in Saint-Pierre.

Logo of ICI Radio-Canada Acadie (CBAFT-DT).

Saint-Pierre-et-Miquelon La Première's missions are to produce local programs and to forge cooperative links with Canadian television networks (in particular, ICI Radio-Canada Télé), and internationally through magazine co-productions and France Ô.

=== Shows ===
- Le Journal: a daily twenty-five-minute French-language newscast presented by the company's journalists, broadcast every evening at 8:00 pm and featuring the main local news stories, as well as a summary of national and international events.
- Le Journal de l'Acadie: rebroadcast of ICI Radio-Canada Acadie's Téléjournal Acadie, Monday to Friday at midnight.
- À la une: debate program on social issues presented by Claire Arrossaména.
- Pô d'doute: program devoted to youth.
- Le Roi Du Bocal: 26-minute show presented by Annaïg Morazé. Two contestants face off in this general knowledge game (questions of all kinds and questions about the Saint-Pierre-et-Miquelon archipelago).

== Broadcast ==
For 44 years, the public television channel was broadcast on the analog VHF and UHF SÉCAM K' network via three TDF transmitters, all of which were switched off at around 10 a.m. on 27 September 2011, the date of Saint-Pierre-et-Miquelon's definitive switchover to all-digital terrestrial broadcasting.

Saint-Pierre-et-Miquelon La Première is broadcast in the territorial collectivity of Saint-Pierre-et-Miquelon on the first channel of DTT multiplex ROM1 via three TDF transmitters (Saint-Pierre-Cap à l'Aigle on channel 37 and Phare de Galantry on channel 35, and Miquelon-Langlade-Pointe au Cheval on channel 41) at UHF PAL MPEG-4 standard and in 16:9 format in 1080i (HD). Initially scheduled for 30 November 2010, digital terrestrial broadcasting of Saint-Pierre-et-Miquelon La Première had to be postponed to early 2011 to enable the implementation of a Viaccess signal encryption system, so that Canadian cable operators could not take over the France Télévisions and Arte channels without the agreement of the rights holders. To receive DTT, TV sets and adapters must have a slot for a CI or CI+ standard Viaccess card reader, which must include VIACCESS 3.0 decoding software. These readers are available on the island in a package including the ROM1 card (Réseau Outre-mer 1 Saint-Pierre-et-Miquelon) and Freebox TV.

Saint-Pierre-et-Miquelon La Première is also broadcast on SPM Telecom's cable network.

The channel has also been available in Canada by satellite via Shaw Direct (channel no. 782) and by cable on the digital cable networks of Videotron (channel no. 50) and Cogeco (channel no. 203) since 1998, despite opposition from the private Quebec network TVA. As of 10 July 2010, it is no longer available on the Bell Satellite TV satellite package (channel 147), following a unilateral commercial decision.

The channel broadcasts in HD only on DTT and satellite, and in SD on other channels.

== See also ==
- Saint Pierre and Miquelon La Première (radio)
- La Première
- France Télévisions
