= Current affairs (news format) =

Genre of broadcast journalism

Current affairs is a genre of broadcast journalism in which major news stories are discussed at length in a timely manner.

This differs from regular news broadcasts that place emphasis on news reports presented for simple presentation as soon as possible, often with a minimum of analysis. It is also different from the news magazine show format in that events are discussed immediately.

The UK's BBC programmes, such as This World, Panorama, Real Story, BBC Scotland Investigates, Spotlight, Week In Week Out, and Inside Out, fit the definition.

In Canada, CBC Radio produces a number of current affairs shows both nationally, such as The Current and As It Happens, as well as regionally with morning current affairs shows such as Information Morning — a focus the radio network developed in the 1970s as a way to recapture audiences from television.

In Australia, the aptly named A Current Affair, developed by the Nine Network in the 1970s, focuses on community issues not usually discussed by major news bulletins. Recurring stories include: hoons, dodgy tradies, neighbours from hell, and corruption. They also run numerous stories about local legends as well as various lifestyle tips. Today Tonight, produced by the Seven Network from 1995 to 2019, was also similar in format, covering stories comparable to that of ACA.

Additionally, newspapers such as the Private Eye, The Economist, Monocle, The Spectator, The Week, The Oldie, Investors Chronicle, Prospect, MoneyWeek, New Statesman, Time, Fortune, BBC History Magazine, and History Today, are all sometimes referred to as current affairs magazines.

== See also ==
- News broadcasting
