= CHTN-FM =

Radio station in Charlottetown, Prince Edward Island

Coordinates: 46°12′44″N 63°20′29″W

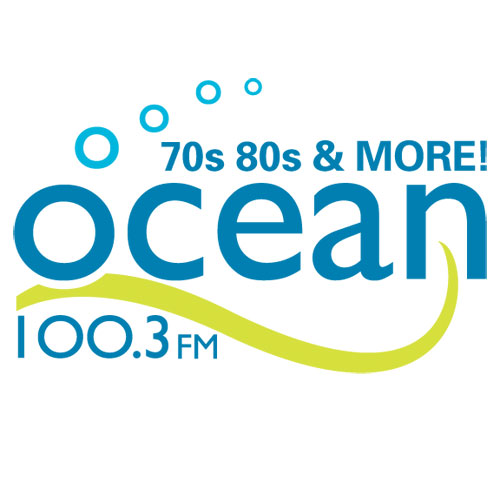
- Charlottetown, Prince Edward Island; Canada
- Frequency: 100.3 MHz
- Branding: Ocean 100

Programming
- Format: Classic hits

Ownership
- Owner: Stingray Group
- Sister stations: CKQK-FM

History
- First air date: December 25, 1974
- Former frequencies: 1190 kHz (AM) (1974–1987); 720 kHz (1987–2006)
- Call sign meaning: "Charlottetown"

Technical information
- Class: C1
- ERP: 33 kW average 88 kW peak Horizontal polarization only
- HAAT: 212.6 metres (698 ft)

Links
- Webcast: Listen live
- Website: ocean100.com

CHTN-FM is a Canadian radio station broadcasting in Charlottetown, Prince Edward Island, at 100.3 FM with a classic hits format branded as Ocean 100. The station is owned by the Stingray Group which also owns sister station CKQK-FM. CHTN's studios & offices are located at 176 Great George Street in Downtown Charlottetown. The station also plays Christmas music for much of November and December.

The station was launched on December 25, 1974, originally broadcasting from a bungalow on North River Road at 1190 AM before moving to 720 which was approved in 1987 to eliminate the nighttime interference from WOWO, out of Fort Wayne, Indiana.

In the early 1990s, Newcap entered into a shared-facilities partnership with Maritime Broadcasting System Ltd, the owner of the competing CFCY and CHLQ-FM. Part of the agreement with MBS saw CHTN move to exclusively offer a popular oldies format. CHTN consolidated its broadcasting facilities with MBS for several years at 141 Kent St., and later on the Charlottetown waterfront, until 2005 when the federal regulator, the Canadian Radio-television and Telecommunications Commission (CRTC), ordered the broadcasters to operate separately. This precipitated a move by Newcap to surrender its AM licence and apply for its current FM frequency of 100.3, as well as open a new sister station, CKQK-FM.

CHTN officially moved to its current frequency and format on July 5, 2006 at 8:05 a.m. It was simulcast on its AM frequency for three months before the AM transmitter was shut down. The first song played was "Start Me Up" by The Rolling Stones. The broadcast staff at the time were; Kirk & Kerri-Wynne (Mornings), Corey Tremere (mid-days), Gerard Murphy (Afternoons) and Gregg MacEwen (Evenings).

== Transmitters ==
An application to add rebroadcasters at Elmira and St. Edward was approved by the CRTC on January 19, 2009. The extender transmitters went on the air March 2, 2010. A free celebration pancake breakfast, with the morning show hosts on location in Tignish and Souris took place on Friday, March 5, 2010.

Rebroadcasters of CHTN-FM
| City of licence | Identifier | Frequency | Power | Class |
|---|---|---|---|---|
| Elmira | CHTN-FM-1 | 99.9 FM | 990 watts | A |
| St. Edward | CHTN-FM-2 | 89.9 FM | 1,600 watts | A |
