= Peter Coade =

Canadian meteorologist and weather presenter (1942–2025)

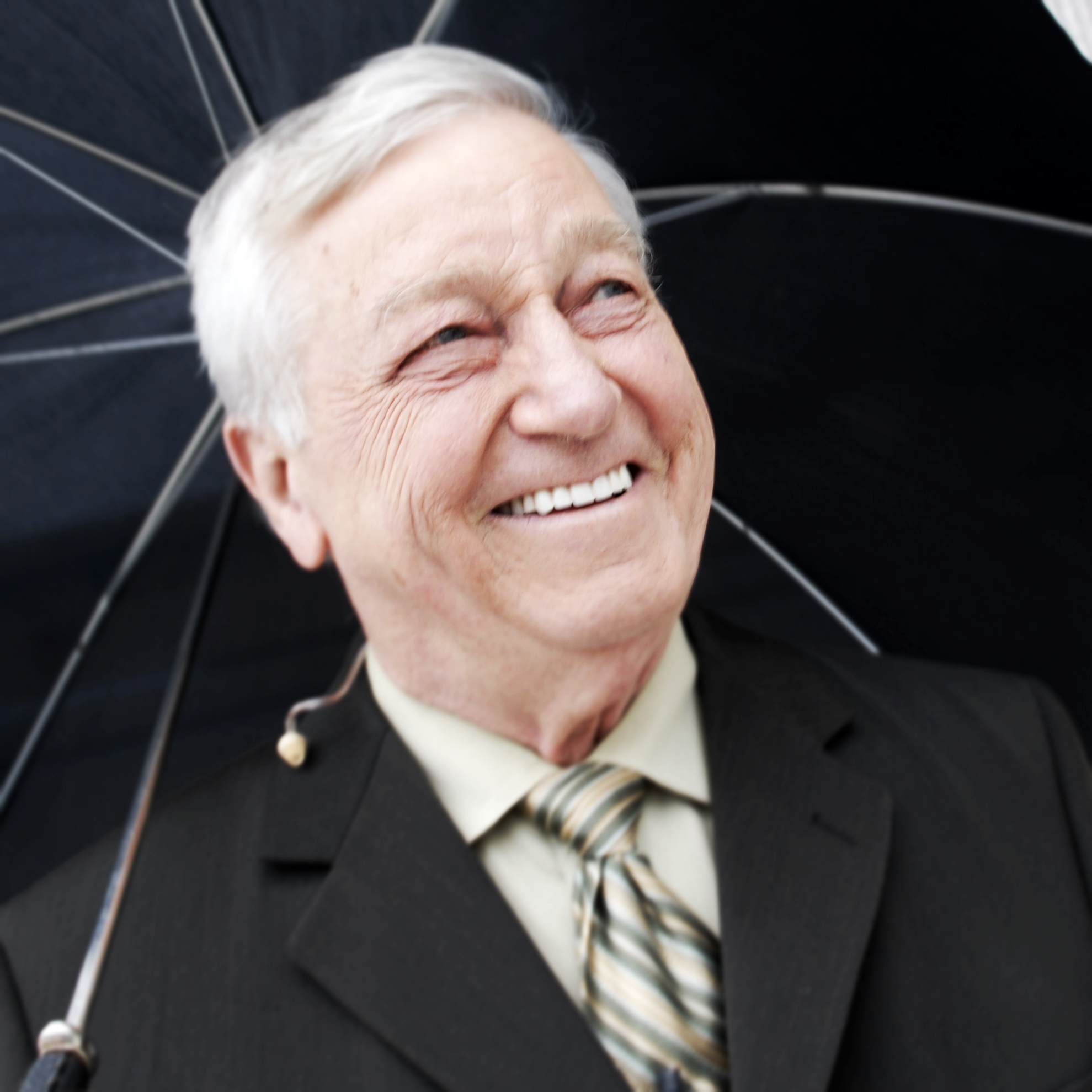
- Coade in 2016
- Born: September 9, 1942; Halifax, Nova Scotia, Canada
- Died: May 3, 2025 (aged 82); Windsor, Nova Scotia, Canada
- Occupations: Meteorologist, television and radio weather presenter
- Known for: Holding the previous Guinness World Record title for the longest television meteorologist and presenter from 1962 until 2013

Peter Coade (September 9, 1942 – May 3, 2025) was a Canadian meteorologist and television and radio weather presenter. In 2013, he was certified by the Guinness World Records as having had the longest career of any weather broadcaster―50 years, 8 months and 21 days―having started in 1962 and continuing until 2013. He held this record until 2016, when American meteorologist Dick Goddard, a weather broadcaster from Cleveland, broke it.

== Career ==
Coade was born in north-end Halifax, Nova Scotia, one of five children of pharmacist Vincent Coade and his wife, Jessie (Preston) Coade, the first female sports journalist for the Halifax Herald. Sometimes interviewing sailors aboard vessels in port, she became known as "Messdeck Annie".

While in high school, Coade job-shadowed the popular Halifax weather presenter Rube Hornstein, appearing with Hornstein on television, but it would be several years before he became an on-air weather broadcaster himself. He was hired by the Meteorological Service of Canada in 1962 as a meteorological technician where he received on-the-job training in meteorology. Postings with the department included Truro, Goose Bay, and Toronto. He began his broadcast career while in Goose Bay in 1967, providing the nightly weather forecasts for the local CBC affiliate CFLA-TV, which was broadcast to US troops in an agreement with the US Air Force.

About 1970, he and his family moved to Toronto where he continued with Environment Canada as a spokesman, meanwhile also serving as staff weather presenter for radio station CFRB. While in Toronto, he was also the official "meteorologist" for the Canadian International Air Show. In 1990, he returned to Halifax where he began a seventeen-year tenure as the evening weatherman for ATV's Live at Five (1998–2007) and the Atlantic Satellite Network. He left ATV when he reached mandatory retirement age in 2007 and immediately re-joined CBC where he continued to forecast the weather for the CBC evening news. On December 3, 2012, he became CBC Radio One's morning "meteorologist", providing weather presentation for six CBC radio stations within the three Maritime provinces, including Information Morning in Halifax.

Coade's career record surpassed that of fellow Canadian Dave Devall of CTV Toronto who retired from his 48-year career in 2009. His Guinness Book of Records citation read: "The longest career as a weather forecaster is 50 years, 8 months and 21 days, and was achieved by Peter Coade (Canada) at CBC Halifax, Nova Scotia, Canada from October 1, 1962 to June 21, 2013". This was subsequently surpassed by Dick Goddard.

He retired on September 30, 2016.

== Death ==
Coade died on May 3, 2025, after a lengthy hospitalization. He was 82.
