= CBAM-FM =

CBC Radio One station in New Brunswick, Canada

- Moncton, New Brunswick; Canada
- Broadcast area: Eastern New Brunswick
- Frequency: 106.1 MHz

Programming
- Format: Public radio; news-talk
- Network: CBC Radio One

Ownership
- Owner: Canadian Broadcasting Corporation
- Sister stations: CBA-FM, CBAF-FM, CBAFT-DT, CBAT-DT

History
- First air date: April 8, 1939
- Former call signs: CBA (1939–2008)
- Former frequencies: 1050 kHz (AM) (1939–1941); 1070 kHz (1941–2008)
- Call sign meaning: Canadian Broadcasting Corporation Atlantic Moncton

Technical information
- Class: C1
- ERP: 69,500 watts horizontal polarization; 34,300 watts vertical polarization
- HAAT: 211 metres (692 ft)

Links
- Website: CBC New Brunswick

CBAM-FM (106.1 MHz) is a public, non-commercial radio station in Moncton, New Brunswick, Canada. It is the local Radio One station of the Canadian Broadcasting Corporation. The studios and offices are at 165 Main Street, in a building known as Ici Acadie, along with facilities for co-owned CBA-FM, CBAF-FM, CBAFT-DT and CBAT-DT.

CBAM-FM is a Class C1 station. It has an effective radiated power (ERP) of 69,500 watts horizontal polarization and 34,300 watts vertical polarization. The transmitter tower is on Timberline Road near Whitfield Trites Road in Moncton.

== Programming ==
CBAM-FM has a local wake-up news and interview program, "Information Morning Moncton" with Jonna Brewer from 6 to 8:30 weekdays. It shares a weekday afternoon show with other CBC Radio One stations in New Brunswick, "Shift". From Halifax, it shares a midday magazine show on weekdays, "Maritime Noon", as well as some weekend shows and newscasts.

Every November, CBAM-FM hosts a local radiothon for the Dr. Georges-L. Dumont Hospital Foundation, with proceeds going to the Tree of Hope Campaign. This radiothon airs only on CBAM-FM.

== History ==
=== CRCA ===
The Canadian Radio Broadcasting Commission owned and operated a station in Moncton under the call sign CRCA, which had previously been CNR Radio station CNRA. The station was taken off the air in on October 31, 1933. Plans were made for the construction of a more powerful transmitter in nearby Sackville that would cover the Maritime provinces.

The CRBC was closed down in 1936 and replaced by the CBC, which inherited the project. It took another three years for the CBC to establish radio service in the area.

=== CBA ===
The new station signed on as CBA on April 8, 1939. It was a 50,000-watt Class I-B station at 1050 AM. CBA was the CBC's clear-channel outlet for the Maritime provinces, heard in the daytime over much of New Brunswick, Nova Scotia, and Prince Edward Island, and at night audible over much of Eastern Canada and the Northeastern United States.

As a result of the North American Regional Broadcasting Agreement treaty (NARBA), it moved to 1070 AM on March 29, 1941, sharing that clear-channel frequency with Los Angeles's KNX. The original city of licence was Sackville, the location of the transmitter site. The city of licence was later changed to Moncton in 1968 when the CBA transmitter, one 460-foot (140 m) tower, moved to Dover Road in the rural community of Fox Creek near Moncton. In the 1950s and 1960s, CBA's studios were located on St. George Street in Moncton.

In September 1970, CBA and its French-language counterparts CBAF and CBAFT were given approval to relocate their studios and offices in a new complex at 250 Archibald Street, now known as University Avenue.

=== Move to 106.1 FM ===
On January 8, 2007, the Canadian Radio-television and Telecommunications Commission (CRTC) approved the station's proposed move to 106.1 FM. Since CBA-FM was already the call sign of the local CBC Radio 2 transmitter, CBA adopted the CBAM-FM call sign. The engineers were at the AM transmitter site on Dover Road in Dieppe to say goodbye to the old AM signal that signed off for good on the morning of April 7, 2008, shortly after the 8:30 CBC news. CBA was the last AM station in eastern New Brunswick, and the CBC wanted to stop a drop in market share.

CBAM was the former call sign of a defunct CBC low-power AM transmitter in Edmundston, which converted to FM as CBAN-FM, an FM rebroadcaster of CBZF-FM in Fredericton.

The original CBA transmitter site at the Tantramar Marshes near Sackville continued to broadcast Radio Canada International around the world on shortwave radio as well as relay broadcasts for several foreign shortwave broadcasters. For the purposes of CRTC licensing, the Sackville complex was designated under the call letters CKCX. The shortwave site discontinued broadcasts on December 1, 2012, after which its facilities were dismantled.

== Staff ==
=== Current staff ===
- Jonna Brewer - Host, Information Morning
- Karin Reid LeBlanc - Executive Producer, Moncton
- Vanessa Blanch - Morning news editor, CBC News
- Shane Magee - reporter, CBC News
- Kate Letterick - reporter, CBC News

=== Former staff ===
- Jo-Ann Roberts - co-host of Information Morning (currently at CBCV-FM Victoria)
- Brent Taylor - co-host of Information Morning (now retired)
- Rhonda Whittaker - host of Information Morning
- Rhonda Day - co-host of Mainstreet (1985–1986)
- Dave MacDonald - host, Information Morning

== Rebroadcasters ==
CBAM-FM has the following rebroadcasters:

Rebroadcasters of CBAM-FM
City of licence	Identifier	Frequency	RECNet	CRTC Decision	Notes
Neguac-Allardville	CBAA-FM	97.9 FM	Query		47°22′39″N 65°26′21.12″W
Campbellton	CBAE-FM	90.5 FM	Query		48°4′58.08″N 66°34′50.16″W; Transmitter site in Quebec
Sackville	CBAM-FM-1	105.7 FM	Query	CRTC 2010-67	45°54′32.04″N 64°23′6″W

On October 25, 2013, the CRTC approved the CBC's application to relocate the facilities of CBAM-FM-1 Sackville to a new transmission site south of Ogden Mill; this was due to the closure of the CBC's shortwave facilities, where the local repeater was also located.
