= CKQK-FM =

Radio station in Charlottetown, Prince Edward Island

Coordinates: 46°12′44″N 63°20′29″W

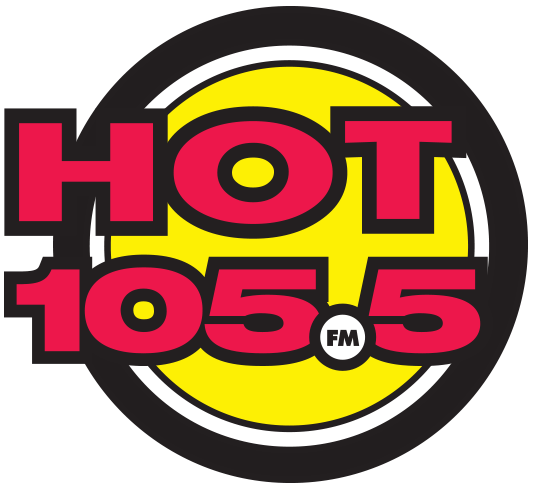
- Charlottetown, Prince Edward Island; Canada
- Frequency: 105.5 MHz
- Branding: Hot 105.5

Programming
- Format: Contemporary hit radio

Ownership
- Owner: Stingray Group
- Sister stations: CHTN-FM

History
- First air date: July 25, 2006

Technical information
- Class: C1
- ERP: 33,000 watts (average); 88,000 watts (peak) horizontal polarization only
- HAAT: 212.6 metres (698 ft)

Links
- Webcast: Listen live
- Website: hot1055fm.com

CKQK-FM is a radio station broadcasting at 105.5 FM in Charlottetown, Prince Edward Island, Canada with a contemporary hit radio format branded on-air as Hot 105.5. The station is owned by the Stingray Group which also owns sister station CHTN-FM. CKQK's studios & offices are located at 176 Great George Street in the downtown Charlottetown area.

On July 11, 2006 Newcap received approval from the Canadian Radio-television and Telecommunications Commission (CRTC) to operate a new FM radio station at Charlottetown.

The station launched on July 25, 2006 under an active rock format branded as K-Rock 105.5 but was re-branded under a new format on January 12, 2012, with the station's last song AC/DC's "Thunderstruck," being abruptly cut mid-way at 1:05 PM (AST) in favour of a lengthy launch montage that was then followed by the first song under the new format being Flo Rida's "Good Feeling." CKQK's current logo and presentation is being patterned after its sister station CIHT-FM in Ottawa.

On November 13, 2008, CKQK applied to add a new FM transmitter at Elmira and another at St. Edward. The application was approved on January 19, 2009. Based on the current format, CKQK currently competes with the Summerside-based CJRW-FM (with a standard AC format).

Rebroadcasters of CKQK-FM
City of licence	Identifier	Frequency	RECNet
Elmira	CKQK-FM-1	103.7 FM	Query
St. Edward	CKQK-FM-2	91.1 FM	Query
