= CBHT-DT =

Television station in Nova Scotia, Canada

- Halifax, Nova Scotia; Canada
- Channels: Digital: 32 (UHF); Virtual: 3
- Branding: CBC Nova Scotia

Programming
- Affiliations: 3.1: CBC Television

Ownership
- Owner: Canadian Broadcasting Corporation
- Sister stations: CBH-FM, CBHA-FM, CBAFT-DT

History
- First air date: December 20, 1954
- Former call signs: CBHT (1954–2011)
- Former channel numbers: Analogue: 3 (VHF, 1954–2011); Digital: 39 (UHF)
- Call sign meaning: CBC Halifax Television

Technical information
- Licensing authority: CRTC
- ERP: 82.62 kW
- HAAT: 261 m (856 ft)
- Transmitter coordinates: 44°39′3″N 63°39′25″W

Links
- Website: CBC Nova Scotia

CBHT-DT (channel 3) is a CBC Television station in Halifax, Nova Scotia, Canada. The station's studios are located on Chebucto Road in Halifax, and its transmitter is located on Washmill Lake Drive (near Bently Drive) on the city's west side.

CBHT-DT serves as CBC's Atlantic Time Zone flagship station. The station broadcasts the network's schedule in local time, except during live events. (Note: If a viewer has a digital cable box or satellite receiver, the CBHT feed shows regular network programming an hour before the Toronto feed, and four hours before the Vancouver feed, and is sometimes referred to as "time-shifting" by cable and satellite operators.) CBHT also became Cape Breton Island's CBC station, when CBIT-TV was closed in 2012 as part of the CBC's digital transition.

== History ==
CBHT started broadcasting on December 20, 1954, using temporary studios at College Street School. In October 1956, CBHT moved into a brand-new 57,000-square-foot (5,295 m^{2}) facility on Bell Road. It entered CBC's microwave network in 1958, and began colour programming in 1966. CBHT eventually covered all of Nova Scotia with rebroadcast transmitters. The tower in the Halifax area on Geizer's Hill (called the CBC tower) is also used by CTV's CJCH-TV, Global's CIHF-TV, most local FM broadcast radio stations and other services. On August 31, 2011, the transition to digital terrestrial over-the-air broadcasting was complete when the station's analog transmitter was permanently shut down, ceasing broadcasts on analog VHF channel 3, and began broadcasting on digital UHF channel 39 (virtual 3.1).

In November 2014, CBHT moved to a new 44,000-square-foot (4,088 m^{2}) facility on Chebucto Road in Halifax, located inside a former Hudson's Bay department store, joined by CBC's Halifax radio stations, which had previously been located in the CBC Radio Building. Originally, plans called for the new facility to completely replace the larger Bell Road studios, which were to close at the end of the 2014–15 television season. Despite this, Studio 1 at Bell Road remained in operation for some time, accommodating productions which were too complex to be produced at Chebucto Road, particularly This Hour Has 22 Minutes. The Bell Road Studio building was finally demolished in November 2020 as part of the Queen Elizabeth II Health Sciences Centre redevelopment project.

=== CBIT-TV ===
On September 26, 1972, CBHT began broadcast operations for a branch station in Sydney, covering all of Cape Breton Island, and parts of eastern Nova Scotia, called CBIT-TV; its call sign meant "Cape Breton Island Television". It was forced to start operating the new station when CHUM Limited purchased the original local station CJCB-TV, the first television station in Nova Scotia, and switched its affiliation to the CTV Television Network on that date. CBIT broadcast on terrestrial channel 5 and local cable channel 3. CBIT had its own newscast – Cape Breton Report – until December 1990. The CBC suffered major cutbacks at the time in terms of staff and funding that eliminated local suppertime news broadcasts in small markets across the country, turning CBIT into just a news bureau feeding the regional production hub in Halifax. Cape Breton Report was cancelled and replaced with CBHT's First Edition. Since then, CBIT was CBHT's full-time repeater station in the Cape Breton market. As part of the CBC's transition to digital transmission, over 600 analogue transmitters were turned off across the country on July 31, 2012. CBIT was shut down on July 31, 2012 — along with the rest of CBHT's repeaters — resulting in CBC Television abandoning over-the-air service in those Cape Breton and mainland Nova Scotia markets.

== Studios at Bell Road ==
- Studio 1 – 4,800 square feet (446 m^{2}) – Constructed in 1993, this was for many years the only dedicated non-news multi-camera television production studio in Atlantic Canada. The studio was also used for non-CBC productions, such as the sketch-comedy show That's So Weird!. The studio was fully equipped for HD production using Hitachi SK-3200 cameras, and though originally scheduled to close at the conclusion of the 2014–15 television season, it remained in operation for several additional years, hosting This Hour Has 22 Minutes during the main television season, and the multi-camera dramatic anthology series Studio Black! during the summer. The studio hosted its final event, the taping of the season finale of 22 Minutes, in February 2020. Production of 22 Minutes moved to a new multicamera production studio created as part of the Light House Arts Centre complex in downtown Halifax.
- Studio 2 – 2,400 square feet (223 m^{2}) – This smaller studio was opened in 1956, and for decades was CBHT's only production studio, used for drama, comedy, variety, and news programming. After the opening of Studio 1, it became a dedicated studio for CBHT's news programming. It was closed in November 2014, when the news division moved to CBC Halifax's new studios on Chebucto Road.

== Studios at Chebucto Road ==
- Studio 50 – Used for CBHT's television news broadcasts.
- Studio 51 – Used for CBHT's television weather reports.
- Studio 60 – 2,500 square feet (232 m^{2}) – Multipurpose television and radio production studio, capable of handling multi-camera television shows or radio productions. The nationally televised competition series Short Film Face Off is taped here, as well as several other local and national programs.

== Productions ==
The station has been responsible for the production of numerous regional and national programs, including the long-running This Hour Has 22 Minutes (1992–present). Other national programs produced at CBHT have included Don Messer's Jubilee, Singalong Jubilee, Countrytime, Take Time With Noel Harrison, Street Cents, and Mary Walsh: Open Book. Notable regional programs have included Switchback, and Land and Sea.

=== News programming ===
Former logo used for news programming, 2015–2019

News programming has been a major component of the station's efforts since its founding. CBHT airs a 60-minute Nova Scotia newscast each weekday starting at 6 p.m. In addition, it airs regional (includes Cape Breton, New Brunswick, Prince Edward Island, and Newfoundland and Labrador) newscasts at 11 p.m. on weeknights and Sundays, and at 7 p.m. on Saturday evenings.

In 2000, its local newscast, First Edition, was cancelled and replaced with Canada Now, anchored in Halifax by Norma Lee MacLeod. The latest version of the newscast for Nova Scotia is called CBC Nova Scotia News, hosted by Tom Murphy, Amy Smith and Ryan Snoddon.

=== Former on-air staff ===
- Peter Coade
- Sharon Dunn
- Ian Hanomansing
- Linden MacIntyre

== Transmitters ==
CBHT had over 30 analog television rebroadcasters in several Nova Scotian communities such as Sydney and Truro. Due to federal funding reductions to the CBC, in April 2012, the CBC responded with substantial budget cuts, which included shutting down CBC's and Radio-Canada's remaining analog transmitters on July 31, 2012. None of CBC or Radio-Canada's television rebroadcasters were converted to digital.

=== Post-shutdown coverage in Newfoundland and Labrador ===
As a result of the closedown of the repeater network, some cable systems in Newfoundland and Labrador owned by Eastlink replaced the province's regional CBC outlet, CBNT-DT, with CBHT, due to what Eastlink claimed were "technical issues" involving CBNT.
