= CBC Radio Building =

Demolished office building in Canada

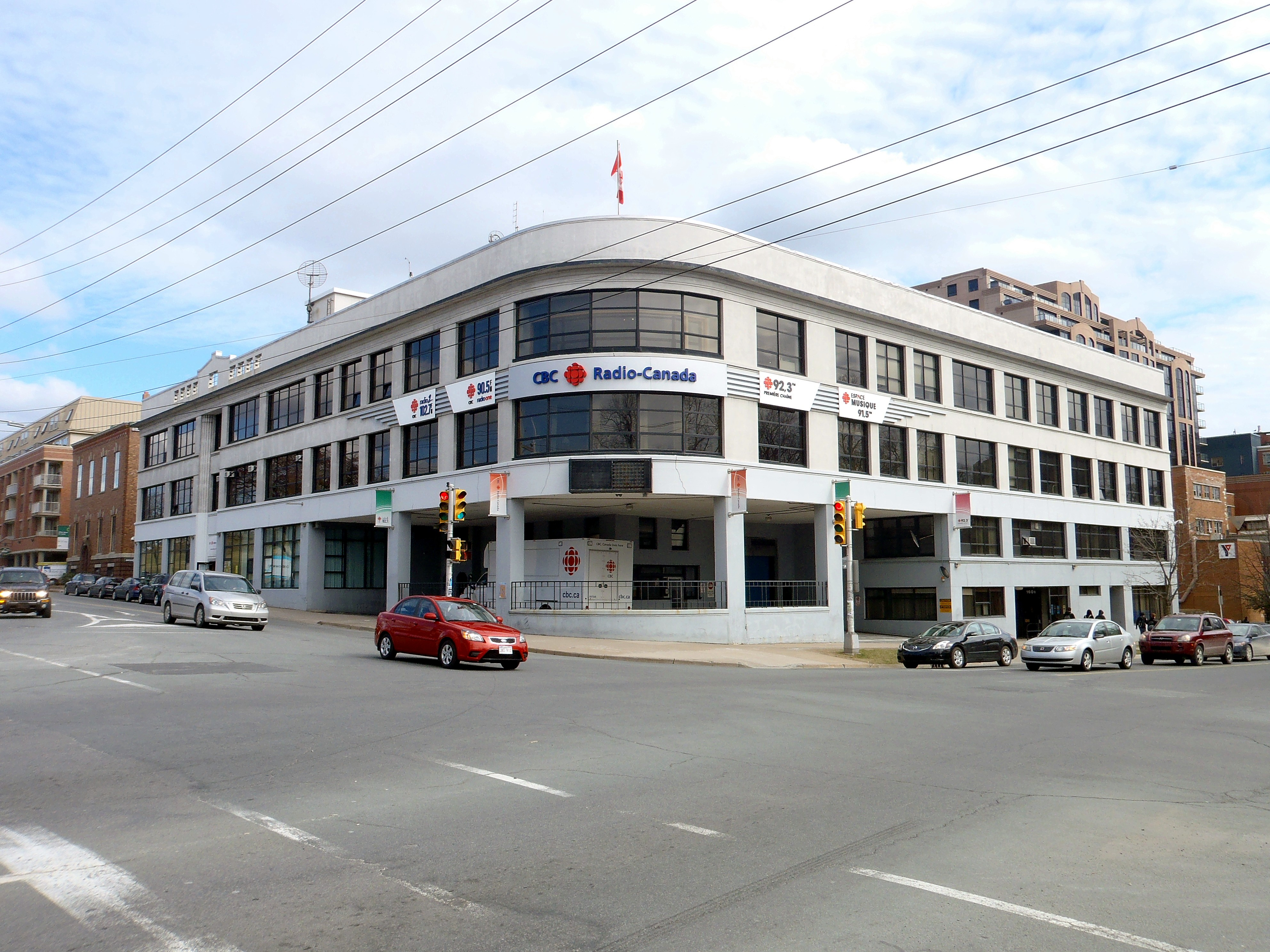
- The building seen in 2012
- Interactive map of the CBC Radio Building area
- Alternative names: United Services Building, F.C. Manning Building

General information
- Status: Demolished
- Architectural style: Streamline Moderne
- Location: Halifax, Nova Scotia, 5600 Sackville Street
- Coordinates: 44°38′36″N 63°34′54″W
- Completed: 1933
- Demolished: 2016

Technical details
- Structural system: Reinforced concrete
- Floor count: 4

Design and construction
- Architect: Sydney Perry Dumaresq

The CBC Radio Building was a landmark Streamline Moderne-style office building located in Halifax, Nova Scotia overlooking the Halifax Citadel and Halifax Public Gardens which served as the home of CBC Radio in Nova Scotia from 1944 to 2014.

== Origins ==
The building was made for Fred C. Manning, a Nova Scotia businessman who built a chain of gas stations and car dealerships during the 1920s and 30s known as the United Service Corporation. Completed in 1933, it originally served as a car dealership, gas station and Manning's head office. Sydney Perry Dumaresq, one of a family of famous Nova Scotian architects, designed the building in the Streamline Moderne-style, a 1930s variation of Art Deco known for its elegant curves and often associated with transportation facilities of the era. In order to maximize the use of the corner property, parking was provided on the roof of the building, with access via a specially built elevator.

== CBC Radio ==
In 1944, the CBC Radio station CBHA and other CBC services in Nova Scotia moved into the building installing their transmission tower on the roof in the first few years. CBC studios soon grew to occupy more of the building which came to serve as home to English CBC Radio One station CBHA-FM and Radio Two station CBH-FM as well as radio administration and various arts programs. The Canadian humourist Max Ferguson began his CBC career in the building in 1946, creating the character "Rawhide" to host a morning country and western show that soon became a satirical hit. After renting for many years, the CBC purchased the building in 1981. However, in the wake of staff reductions and programming cuts, the CBC sold the building in 2014 as part of plans to consolidate television and radio in a new facility on 7067 Chebucto Road in the Armdale neighbourhood of Halifax's West End.

== Arts space ==
In addition to its role as the Halifax home of CBC Radio, the building also offered free space to a wide range of arts organizations, playing a vital role in the growth of the province's cultural scene. The offices of the classical music organizations Debut Atlantic and the St. Cecilia Concert Series were housed there at the invitation of then-regional radio director Bill Donovan. in 1993, the building also became home to the Atlantic Film Festival at the invitation of then-CBC Television director Fred Mattocks, following the festival's loss of office space at the National Film Board of Canada's centre on Barrington Street, which was destroyed by fire in 1991. Other arts organizations with space at the building included the Centre for Art Tapes, the Atlantic Filmmakers Cooperative, the Linda Joy Media Arts Society, the Moving Images Group, Shortworks, and dance groups Mocean Dance and Live Art Dance.

== Demolition ==
CBC broadcast its final shows from the building in November 2014. The building was purchased by Southwest Developments who began demolition on it in March 2016. The former site of the CBC building and the adjacent YMCA are now the location of two 13-storey residential buildings.
