= CBAF-FM =

Ici Radio-Canada Première station in New Brunswick

- Moncton, New Brunswick; Canada
- Broadcast area: New Brunswick
- Frequency: 88.5 MHz
- Branding: Ici Radio-Canada Première

Programming
- Language: French
- Format: News/Talk

Ownership
- Owner: Canadian Broadcasting Corporation
- Sister stations: CBAM-FM, CBAFT-DT

History
- First air date: February 20, 1954
- Former frequencies: 1300 kHz (AM) (1954–1988)
- Call sign meaning: Canadian Broadcasting Corporation Atlantic French

Technical information
- Class: C1
- ERP: 50,000 watts horizontal polarization 21,000 watts vertical polarization
- HAAT: 211 metres (692 ft)
- Transmitter coordinates: 46°08′37″N 64°54′06″W

Links
- Website: Ici Radio-Canada Première

CBAF-FM (88.5 MHz) is a French-language public Canadian radio station located in Moncton, New Brunswick. The station has a commercial-free news/talk format and is the flagship station of the Ici Radio-Canada Première network for Atlantic Canada. CBAF is owned and operated by the Canadian Broadcasting Corporation.

CBAF was launched in 1954, the first French-language radio station for the Moncton area at 1300 kHz. In 1980, the station was granted a rebroadcaster on FM at 88.5 MHz, to offset AM radio reception problems in the Moncton area. The CBC operated both transmitters until 1988, when the AM transmitter signed off and the FM transmitter became the station's primary frequency.

== History ==
The construction of a new CBC station in Moncton was started in 1953 at an expected cost of $450,000.

CBAF went on the air on February 20, 1954. Studios and offices were then located at St. George Street in the former Assomption Building, a four-storey structure built in 1955 by the Société l'Assomption (the former Assomption Building is not the current Place Assomption on Main Street in Moncton). Today known as the Maison Commerce House, it overlooks St. George and Archibald Streets. The premiere French-language radio station for the Atlantic region, CBAF offered programming from the CBC's French-language network headquarters in Montreal, Quebec.

In 1957, CBAF had a radiated power of 5,000 watts and used a single directional antenna pattern. The transmitter was located in the nearby village of Saint Anselme. In 1968, a regional French-language production centre was set up at the Moncton studios.

In 1970, CBAF, with its Radio-Canada television station CBAFT, and English-language counterpart CBA, relocated to their new studios and offices on Archibald Street (today known as University Avenue) beside the Hôtel-Dieu de l'Assomption Hospital, which was renamed the Dr. Georges-L. Dumont Regional Hospital by the Government of New Brunswick in 1967.

On April 10, 1980, FM rebroadcaster CBAF-26-FM (88.5 MHz) signed on in Moncton to duplicate the programming of CBAF. The duplicate channel was needed in order to offset severe night-time coverage deficiencies of the AM signal and to improve the reception of the station in outlying areas. CBAF was to have gone silent by November 1, 1985, but the CBC kept it going until the plug was finally pulled in 1988. In the end, CBAF operated on 1300 kHz with a power of 5,000 watts (single directional pattern). CBAF-26-FM operated on 88.5 MHz with an effective radiated power of 50,000 watts. The FM repeater became CBAF-FM, following the closure of the AM signal.

The Radio-Canada network was renamed "Première Chaîne" on September 1, 1997, later becoming "Ici Radio-Canada Première" in August 2013.

== Rebroadcasters ==
Rebroadcasters of CBAF-FM
City of licence	Identifier	Frequency	Power	Class	RECNet	CRTC Decision	Notes
Allardville	CBAF-FM-2	105.7 FM	60,400 watts	C1	Query		47°22′39″N 65°26′21.12″W
Bon Accord	CBAF-FM-21	91.7 FM	20,900 watts	C	Query		46°38′57.84″N 67°35′33″W
Campbellton	CBAF-FM-3	91.5 FM	2,400 watts	B	Query		48°4′58.08″N 66°34′50.16″W; Transmitter site in Quebec
Edmundston	CBAF-FM-4	100.3 FM	20,935 watts	B	Query		47°23′21.12″N 68°18′57.96″W
Kedgwick	CBAF-FM-23	98.1 FM	50 watts	LP	Query	2014-9	47°38′54.96″N 67°21′6.12″W
Grande-Anse	CBAF-FM-18	90.3 FM	930 watts	A	Query		47°49′0.84″N 65°8′49.92″W
Saint John	CBAF-FM-1	102.3 FM	84,000 watts	C	Query		45°28′40.08″N 66°14′3.84″W; Also serves Fredericton
Saint-Quentin	CBAF-FM-22	91.1 FM	50 watts	LP	Query	2014-9	47°30′43.92″N 67°23′43.08″W

On July 25, 2013, the CBC filed and application to the CRTC to convert CBAF-21 Saint-Quentin from 1230 kHz to 91.1 MHz; this was approved January 10, 2014.

On August 15, 2013, the CBC filed and application to the CRTC to convert CBAF-20 Kedgwick from 990 kHz to 98.1 MHz. this was approved January 10, 2014.

=== Former rebroadcasters ===
CBAF-FM-5 in Halifax and CBAF-FM-15 in Charlottetown were once satellites of CBAF, but are now stations in their own right despite retaining rebroadcaster-like callsigns. CBAF-FM-5 and CBAF-FM-15 officially became separately licensed in 1987 and 1994 respectively.
