= CBHA-FM =

CBC Radio One station in Halifax, Nova Scotia

- Halifax, Nova Scotia; Canada
- Broadcast area: Mainland Nova Scotia
- Frequency: 90.5 MHz
- Branding: CBC Radio One

Programming
- Format: News/Talk

Ownership
- Owner: Canadian Broadcasting Corporation
- Sister stations: CBH-FM, CBHT-DT

History
- First air date: September 1944
- Former call signs: CBH (1944–1989)
- Former frequencies: 1240 kHz (1944–1948); 1330 kHz (1948–1960); 1340 kHz (1960–1963); 860 kHz (1963–1989)
- Call sign meaning: Canadian Broadcasting Corporation Halifax

Technical information
- Class: C
- ERP: 91,000 watts (horizontal polarization only)
- HAAT: 230.5 metres (756 ft)

Links
- Website: CBC Nova Scotia

CBHA-FM is a Canadian radio station. It is the CBC Radio One affiliate in Halifax, Nova Scotia, broadcasting at 90.5 MHz. It is the flagship CBC Radio One station for the Maritime provinces. CBHA's studios are located on 7067 Chebucto Road in Halifax, while its transmitter is located on Washmill Lake Drive in Clayton Park.

== History ==
The station was launched in 1944 on 1240 AM with the call sign CBH. Prior to its launch, CBC Radio programming aired on private affiliate CHNS and its shortwave relay CHNX 6.13 MHz (in the 49m band). CBH's initial power was only 100 watts and remained at that level for 18 years. In 1947, the station moved to the CBC Radio Building at 5600 Sackville Street. In 1948, the frequency was changed to 1330, and then to 1340 in 1960. In 1963, the station moved to 860 and boosted its power to 10,000 watts.

However, CBH had to conform its nighttime signal to protect clear-channel sister station CJBC in Toronto, rendering it practically unlistenable at night in some parts of Halifax. To solve this problem, an FM rebroadcaster, CBHA-FM, was established on 90.5 FM in 1977. While it was only intended to be temporary, the CBC was unable to obtain the funding necessary to upgrade CBH's AM signal. On October 1, 1989, the AM station was shut down, and CBHA became the main CBC station in Halifax.

== Local programming ==
The station's local programs are Information Morning and Main Street, hosted by Jeff Douglas, in the afternoon. Additionally, it produces several programs that air across the Maritimes, including the weekday noon-hour regional program Maritime Noon and the regional weekend programs Weekend Mornings, Maritime Magazine, Atlantic Airwaves and Maritime Connection.

Shows are produced at studios in the CBC Radio Building at the intersection of Bell Road, Sackville Street, and South Park Street in Halifax. The station serves the Nova Scotia mainland through a network of rebroadcast transmitters, whose schedule is identical to the signal out of Halifax, with the exception of a regional program weekday afternoons from 3:00 to 4:00. The main transmitter in Halifax, as well as the rebroadcaster in Sheet Harbour, air an additional hour of "Main Street" during this time.

== Transmitters ==
Rebroadcasters of CBHA-FM
City of licence	Identifier	Frequency	Power	Class	RECNet	CRTC Decision	Notes
Liverpool	CBHL-FM	97.1 FM	6,400 watts	B	Query		44°4′1.92″N 64°43′0.84″W
Middleton	CBHM-FM	106.5 FM	93,400 watts	C	Query		45°4′45.12″N 64°48′51.12″W
Mulgrave	CBHB-FM	106.7 FM	93,400 watts	C	Query		45°35′56.04″N 61°24′43.92″W
New Glasgow	CBHN-FM	89.5 FM	1,200 watts	A	Query		45°32′2.04″N 62°38′8.88″W
Sheet Harbour	CBAZ-FM	97.3 FM	9,345 watts	B	Query	85-518	44°55′32.88″N 62°30′1.08″W
Shelburne	CBAP-FM	100.3 FM	1,250 watts	A	Query	88-644	43°46′35.04″N 65°18′25.92″W
Truro	CBHC-FM	89.1 FM	1,170 watts	A	Query		45°27′0″N 63°17′22.92″W
Yarmouth	CBHY-FM	92.1 FM	94,300 watts	B	Query		43°55′58.08″N 66°6′6.12″W

On December 10, 2018, the Canadian Radio-television and Telecommunications Commission (CRTC) approved the CBC's application to operate a new FM transmitter in Digby at 107.1 MHz (channel 296A) with an effective radiated power of 420 watts (non-directional antenna with an effective height of antenna above average terrain of 256.6 metres). The callsign for the new FM transmitter at Digby is CBHA-FM-1 and rebroadcasts the programming of CBHA. However, the station cannot be found in ISED Canada's spectrum database, suggesting that it is silent.
