= CBCT-DT =

Television station in Charlottetown

- Charlottetown, Prince Edward Island; Canada
- Channels: Digital: 13 (VHF); Virtual: 13
- Branding: CBC Prince Edward Island (general); CBC Compass (newscasts)

Programming
- Affiliations: 13.1: CBC Television

Ownership
- Owner: Canadian Broadcasting Corporation
- Sister stations: CBCT-FM, CBCH-FM, CBAFT-DT

History
- First air date: July 1, 1956
- Former call signs: CFCY-TV (1956–1968); CBCT (1968–2011)
- Former channel numbers: Analogue: 13 (VHF, 1956–2011)
- Call sign meaning: CBC Charlottetown Television

Technical information
- Licensing authority: CRTC
- ERP: 13.03 kW
- HAAT: 268.8 m (882 ft)
- Transmitter coordinates: 46°12′44″N 63°20′30″W
- Translator(s): see § Transmitters

Links
- Website: CBC Prince Edward Island

CBCT-DT (channel 13) is a CBC Television station in Charlottetown, Prince Edward Island, Canada. The station's studios are located on University Avenue in Charlottetown, and its transmitter is located on Route 1 near Bonshaw. It is the only full-fledged television station based in Prince Edward Island; all other television service in the province is provided by repeaters of stations from New Brunswick.

== History ==
CBCT first went on the air on July 1, 1956, as CFCY-TV, under the ownership of the Rogers family and their company, Island Broadcasting, along with CFCY radio (AM 630, now FM 95.1). Family patriarch Col. Keith Rogers had begun laying the groundwork to bring television to PEI earlier in the decade, but died two years before channel 13 went on the air. His widow Flora Rogers, daughter Betty Rogers Large and son-in-law Bob Large took over his dream and signed on the station as a Dominion Day present to Prince Edward Island.

By the late 1960s, it was obvious that PEI's population was too small to warrant a second full-fledged television station. With this in mind, CJCH-TV in Halifax made plans to set up a rebroadcaster in hopes of bringing CTV to the island. The Rogers feared that they would not be able to compete with CTV, and sold CFCY-TV to the CBC in 1968. The CBC closed on the purchase on August 1 of that year and changed its calls to CBCT. As it turned out, CBCT would remain the only television station in the province until CKCW-TV in Moncton set up a rebroadcaster in Charlottetown in 1972.

== News programming ==
The flagship local newscast, CBC News: Compass, is anchored by Louise Martin, and enjoys very high ratings throughout Prince Edward Island. As the only PEI-specific newscast in the province, it consistently outdraws CTV's local newscasts in the ratings by a wide margin. The program airs each weeknight from 6 to 7 p.m.

In addition to Compass, CBCT also co-produces and simulcasts pan-regional newscasts for the Maritimes. Atlantic Tonight at 11 (Sunday–Friday) and Atlantic Tonight Saturday (7 p.m., Saturday) are broadcast from CBHT-DT in Halifax and are also seen on CBAT-DT in Fredericton and CBNT-DT in St. John's.

== Transmitters ==
CBCT had two analogue rebroadcasters located in St. Edward and Elmira.

Due to federal funding reductions to the CBC, in April 2012, the CBC responded with substantial budget cuts, which included shutting down CBC's and Radio-Canada's remaining analogue transmitters on July 31, 2012. However, due to the extremely high penetration of cable and satellite in the province, actual loss of access to CBC programming in the province was limited.

=== Former transmitters ===
City of license	Callsign	Channel	ERP
CBCT-1	St. Edward	4	258 watts
CBCT-2	Elmira	11	462 watts
