= St. Edward, Prince Edward Island =

Locality in Prince Edward Island, Canada

Coordinates: 46°52′44.5″N 64°10′58″W

St. Edward is a locality in the Canadian province of Prince Edward Island, located in Lot 2 of Prince County, northwest of Alberton.

St. Edward is the community of license for several radio and television rebroadcasters, which serve the portion of western Prince Edward Island lying outside the broadcast range of the stations' transmitters in Charlottetown. These include CBC Television's CBCT, CBC Radio One's CBCT-FM, CTV's CKCW, SRC's CBAFT and Première Chaîne's CBAF-FM-15.
