= Elmira, Prince Edward Island =

Elmira
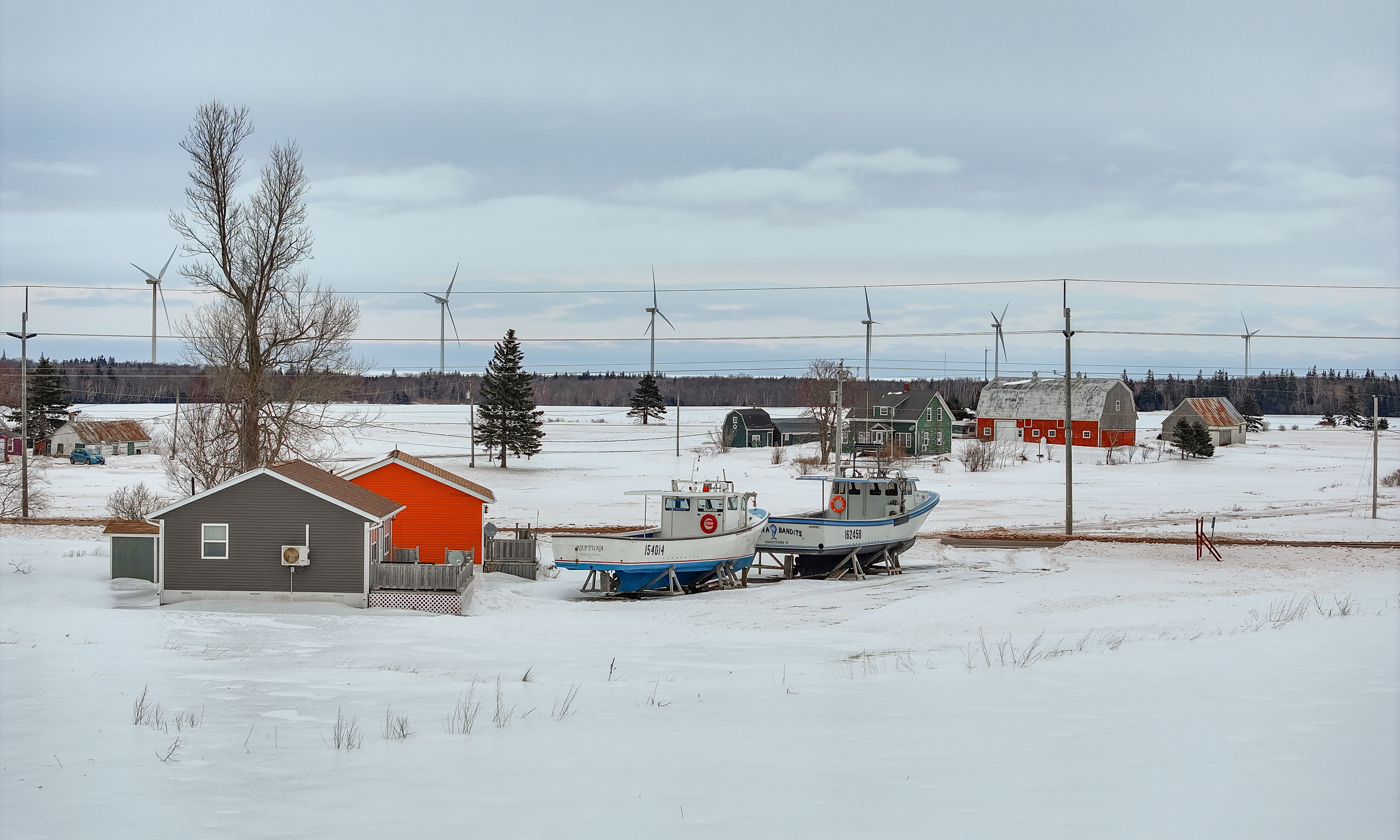
- Elmira in 2025

- Location of Elmira in Prince Edward Island
- Coordinates: 46°26′20.1″N 62°3′57.9″W
- Country: Canada
- Province: Prince Edward Island
- County: Kings County

Elmira is a community in the Canadian province of Prince Edward Island, located in Lot 47 of Kings County, northeast of Souris.

CBC Television's CBCT and CBC Radio One's CBCT-FM maintain rebroadcasters at Elmira to serve the portion of eastern Prince Edward Island which lies outside the broadcast range of those stations' main transmitters in Charlottetown.

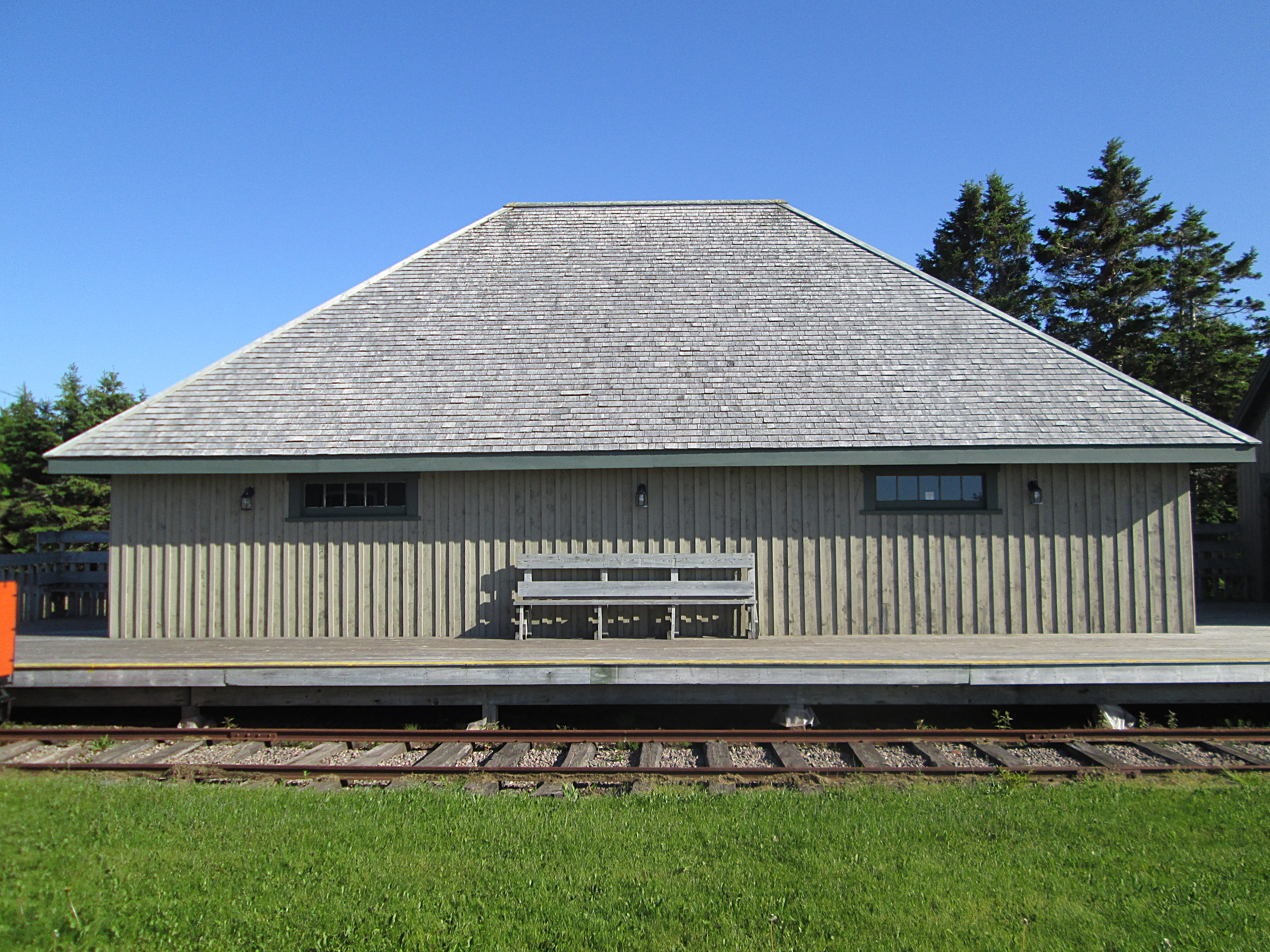
Elmira Railway Museum

== Elmira Railway Museum ==
Opened in the former Prince Edward Island Railway station in 1975, it no longer has any rolling stock displayed by mid 2000s but acquired CN caboose 78431 in 2009.

== Eastern Kings wind farm ==
Eastern Kings is a wind farm located at Souris-Elmira, PEI, Canada. It was completed on January 22, 2007, and it is owned and operated by PEI Energy Corporation.

The wind farm consists of ten Vestas V90 wind turbines 3 MW. Annual production will be 90-95 million kilowatt hours. The average house uses about 8,000 kilowatt hours of electricity annually so the wind farm will produce enough electricity to power about 12,000 homes. The Eastern Kings Wind Farm was projected to supply about 7.5% of PEI's electricity and displace 75,000 tonnes of greenhouse gases per year. The project capital cost was approximately $47 million.
