= CHLQ-FM =

Radio station in Charlottetown, Prince Edward Island

Coordinates: 46°16′5″N 63°20′30″W

- Charlottetown, Prince Edward Island; Canada
- Frequency: 93.1 MHz
- Branding: Max 93.1

Programming
- Format: Mainstream rock
- Affiliations: Charlottetown Islanders

Ownership
- Owner: Maritime Broadcasting System
- Sister stations: CFCY-FM, CJRW-FM

History
- First air date: March 1982

Technical information
- Class: C1
- ERP: 75,000 watts Horizontal polarization only
- HAAT: 253 metres (830 ft)

Links
- Webcast: Listen Live
- Website: Max931.ca

CHLQ-FM is a Canadian radio station broadcasting at 93.1 FM in Charlottetown, Prince Edward Island. The station is owned by the Maritime Broadcasting System and currently broadcasts a mainstream rock format branded on-air as Max 93.1. The station has been on the air since March 1982.

== As Max 93.1 ==
On July 16, 2012, CHLQ-FM switched from adult contemporary/classic hits (Magic 93) to mainstream rock (Q93).

As of early 2017, the Morning Show portion of the program has been renamed from "The Q Morning Crew with Paul and Anne" to "The Unbalanced Breakfast with Joee Adams".

On April 1, 2022, Q93 rebranded to Max 93.1, while maintaining a mainstream rock format.

== Former Logos ==
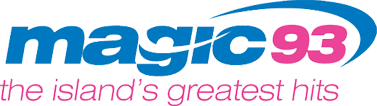
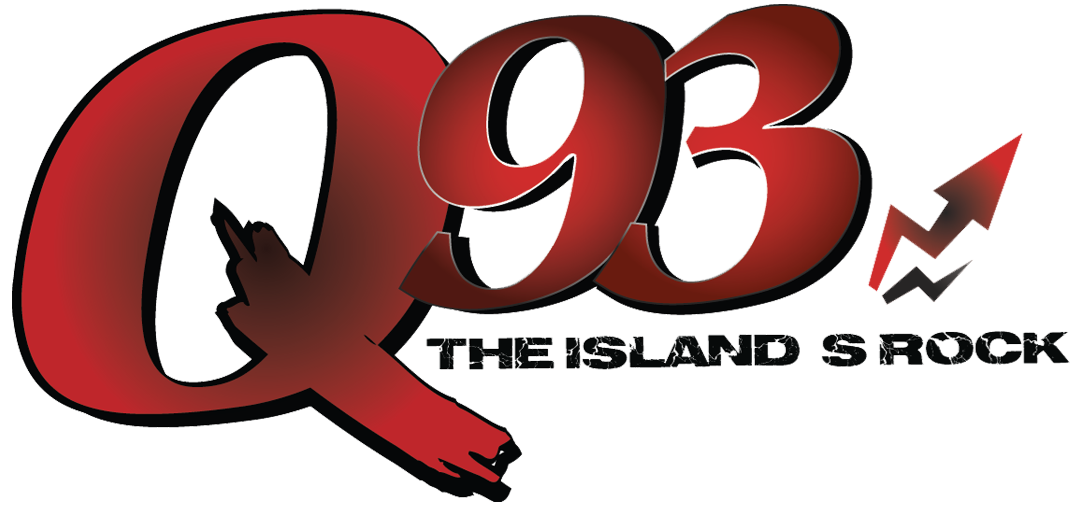

== See also ==
- CFCY-FM
- CJRW-FM
