= CBAFT-DT =

Television station in New Brunswick, Canada

- Moncton, New Brunswick; Canada
- Channels: Digital: 11 (VHF); Virtual: 11
- Branding: ICI Acadie

Programming
- Affiliations: 11.1: Ici Radio-Canada Télé

Ownership
- Owner: Société Radio-Canada
- Sister stations: CBAF-FM, CBAX-FM, CBAT-DT, CBCT-DT, CBHT-DT, CBNT-DT

History
- First air date: December 21, 1959
- Former call signs: CBAFT (1959–2011)
- Former channel numbers: Analog: 11 (VHF, 1959–2011)
- Call sign meaning: CBC Atlantic Français Télévision

Technical information
- Licensing authority: CRTC
- ERP: 17.65 kW
- HAAT: 227.5 m (746 ft)
- Transmitter coordinates: 46°8′37″N 64°54′8″W

Links
- Website: ICI Acadie

CBAFT-DT (channel 11) is an Ici Radio-Canada Télé owned-and-operated station in Moncton, New Brunswick, Canada, serving Acadians in the Maritimes and Franco-Newfoundlanders in Newfoundland and Labrador. It is part of a twinstick with Fredericton-based CBC Television station CBAT-DT (channel 4). CBAFT-DT's studios are located on Main Street in Moncton, adjacent to the Dieppe border and the CF Champlain shopping centre, and its transmitter is located on Timberline Road in Moncton.

Prior to September 2, 2008, the station was known as Télévision de Radio-Canada Atlantique. It was rebranded to Télévision de Radio-Canada Acadie and later ICI Acadie as part of the public broadcaster's efforts to better reflect the region it serves.

== Overview ==
The station was launched at 6:25 p.m. on December 21, 1959, from Moncton on channel 11. The station slowly added rebroadcasters, such as one serving Fredericton and Saint John in 1973 on channel 5. Radio-Canada later converted CJBR-TV-1 Edmundston, a retransmitter of a former affiliate in Rimouski, Quebec on channel 13, to a rebroadcaster of CBAFT.

The station operates additional news bureaus in Edmundston, Bathurst, Caraquet, Fredericton and Saint John; Halifax, Nova Scotia; St. John's, Newfoundland and Labrador; and Charlottetown, Prince Edward Island.

Unlike all other Radio-Canada stations, programming in the Atlantic region airs one hour later than its scheduled time in the rest of Canada; this noted by the phrase Une heure plus tard dans les Maritimes, present on nearly all Radio-Canada network promos. (Due to Newfoundland's small Francophone population, the correct time for programs there is only noted on local promos.)

== Local programming ==
- Le Téléjournal/Acadie, formerly Le Téléjournal/Atlantique, daily newscast airing every day at 6:00 p.m. AT. Janique LeBlanc anchors the program from Monday to Thursday. Karine Godin anchors from Friday to Sunday.
- Luc et Luc (December 2007–), a talk show hosted by comedian Luc LeBlanc. The program is recorded from the Théâtre l'Escaouette in Moncton.

=== Exchange agreement with RFO, then La Première ===
Saint Pierre and Miquelon La Première

In May 2010, it was announced that CBAFT will be exchanging news stories and reporters with Télé Saint-Pierre-et-Miquelon (call sign: FQN), the RFO outlet for the French overseas collectivity of Saint Pierre and Miquelon, in an agreement made with France Télévisions, the public broadcaster that oversees RFO (since renamed La Première, with the local affiliate called Saint Pierre and Miquelon La Première). In addition, Télé Saint-Pierre-et-Miquelon will also broadcast Le Téléjournal/Acadie to local viewers there, as well as on France Ô, which showcases RFO programming for viewers in Metropolitan France. In consequence, due to Télé Saint-Pierre-et-Miquelon's availability on Canadian cable and satellite, the program will be available to viewers across Canada as well. This exchange was following the arrival of the aerial TNT digital television service to Saint Pierre and Miquelon, which offers only RFO and Metropolitan France channels, unlike the local cable system, which offers Canadian and American channels, including CBAFT.

== Transmitters ==
CBAFT had 21 analog television rebroadcasters throughout the Maritimes.

Due to federal funding reductions to the CBC, in April 2012, the CBC responded with substantial budget cuts, which included shutting down CBC's and Radio-Canada's remaining analog transmitters on July 31, 2012. None of CBC or Radio-Canada's rebroadcasters were converted to digital.

Transmitters in mandatory markets were required to go digital or be taken off the air by the transition deadline of August 31, 2011. The CBC decided that none of its rebroadcasters would switch to digital. The following CBAFT rebroadcasters were in mandatory markets:

- CBAFT-1 and CBAFT-10 Fredericton, NB (CBAFT-1 served Kings County and Saint John, while CBAFT-10 offered city-grade coverage to Fredericton)
- CBFJ-TV St John's, NL
- CBHFT Halifax, NS
- CBAFT-5 Charlottetown, PE

On August 16, 2011, the CRTC granted the CBC permission to continue operating 22 repeaters in mandatory markets, including the above, in analog until August 31, 2012, by which time they must either convert to digital or shut down.

=== Former transmitters ===
==== New Brunswick ====
Call sign	City of licence	Channel	ERP (W)	Notes
CBAFT-1	Fredericton (Saint John)	5 (VHF)	60,000	
CBAFT-2	Edmundston (Madawaska, Maine, U.S.)	13 (VHF)	36,000	
CBAFT-3	Allardville	3 (VHF)	9,400	
CBAFT-4	Grand Falls/Grand Sault	12 (VHF)	36,000	
CBAFT-7	Campbellton	9 (VHF)	100,800	
CBAFT-8	St-Quentin	21 (UHF)	579	
CBAFT-9	Kedgwick	44 (UHF)		
CBAFT-10	Fredericton	19 (UHF)	7,800	

==== Newfoundland and Labrador ====
Call sign	City of licence	Channel	ERP (W)	Notes
CBFJ-TV	St. John's	4 (VHF)	291	Formerly CBNFT

==== Nova Scotia ====
Call sign	City of licence	Channel	ERP (W)	Notes
CBHFT	Halifax	13 (VHF)	4	Was the parent transmitter for Nova Scotia's Radio-Canada service as a separate station.
CBHFT-1	Yarmouth	3 (VHF)	19	
CBHFT-2	Mulgrave	7 (VHF)	106,000	
CBHFT-3	Sydney	13 (VHF)	4,500	
CBHFT-4	Cheticamp	10 (VHF)	7,900	
CBHFT-5	Middleton	46 (UHF)	120,000	
CBHFT-6	Digby	58 (UHF)	3	
CBHFT-7	New Glasgow	15 (UHF)	6,400	
CBHFT-8	Weymouth	34 (UHF)	100	

==== Prince Edward Island ====
Call sign	City of licence	Channel	ERP (W)	Notes
CBAFT-5	Charlottetown	31 (UHF)	28,000	
CBAFT-6	St. Edward	9 (VHF)	100	
