= CBAF-FM-15 =

Ici Radio-Canada Premiere station in Prince Edward Island

- Charlottetown, Prince Edward Island; Canada
- Broadcast area: Prince Edward Island
- Frequency: 88.1 MHz

Programming
- Format: News/Talk
- Network: Ici Radio-Canada Première

Ownership
- Owner: Canadian Broadcasting Corporation

History
- First air date: Late 1970s (as a CBAF repeater); 1994 (as a separate station)
- Call sign meaning: Canadian Broadcasting Corporation Atlantic French

Technical information
- Licensing authority: CRTC
- Class: C
- ERP: 30,164 watts average 88,000 watts peak horizontal polarization only
- HAAT: 199 metres (653 ft)

Links
- Website: ici.radio-canada.ca/premiere

CBAF-FM-15 is a French language Canadian radio station located in Charlottetown, Prince Edward Island.

Owned and operated by the (government-owned) Canadian Broadcasting Corporation (French: Société Radio-Canada), it broadcasts on 88.1 MHz using a directional antenna with an average effective radiated power of 30,164 watts and a peak effective radiated power of 88,000 watts (class C).

The station has an ad-free news/talk format and is part of the Ici Radio-Canada Première network, which operates across Canada. Like all Première stations, but unlike most FM stations, it broadcasts in mono.

The station signed on sometime in the late 1970s as a rebroadcaster of CBAF in Moncton. On October 3, 1983, a first radio show was produced for the Island from Moncton (La marée de l'Île, hosted by Maurice Arsenault). In 1994, it officially became a separate station, though it still has rebroadcaster-like calls.

The station has its own morning drive show, produced in Charlottetown since September 1, 1996. Denis Duchesne is the host of Le Réveil, Monday to Friday from 6 to 9 a.m. The rest of its programming is a simulcast of CBAF-FM-5 from Halifax, Nova Scotia.

On November 21, 2005, the CRTC granted CBAF-FM-15 to operate rebroadcasters in St. Edward and Urbainville to serve areas on the fringe of the primary transmitter's signal.

CBAF-FM-15 was originally identified as CBAF-29-FM; the call sign change took effect on September 1, 1989, as the old 1300 kHz signal of CBAF was shut down.

== Transmitters ==
Rebroadcasters of CBAF-FM-15
City of licence	Identifier	Frequency	Power	Class	RECNet	CRTC Decision	Notes
St. Edward	CBAF-FM-20	97.5 FM	1880 watts	B1	Query	2005-546	46°53′34.08″N 64°8′53.16″W
Urbainville	CBAF-FM-19	106.9 FM	173 watts	A1	Query	2005-545	46°27′37.08″N 64°3′10.08″W
