= CFCY-FM =

Radio station in Prince Edward Island, Canada

Coordinates: 46°12′44″N 63°20′29″W

- Charlottetown, Prince Edward Island; Canada
- Frequency: 95.1 MHz (FM)
- Branding: 95.1 CFCY

Programming
- Format: Country
- Affiliations: CBC (1936–1977)

Ownership
- Owner: Maritime Broadcasting System
- Sister stations: CHLQ-FM, CJRW-FM

History
- First air date: September 1925 (experimental as 10AS, 1924–1925)
- Former frequencies: 250 metres (1924–1925); 960 kHz (1925–1931); 580 AM (1931–1933); 630 AM (1933–2006)

Technical information
- Class: C1
- ERP: 100,000 watts Horizontal polarization only
- HAAT: 253 metres (830 ft)

Links
- Webcast: Listen Live
- Website: cfcy.fm

CFCY-FM is a Canadian radio station broadcasting at 95.1 FM in Charlottetown, Prince Edward Island, with a country format branded on-air as 95.1 CFCY. The station is owned and operated by the Maritime Broadcasting System.

== History ==
The station was first launched by radio pioneer Keith Rogers on August 15, 1924 as 10AS on 250 meters. In 1925, the station was granted a full license as CFCY, broadcasting at 960 AM. It is among the oldest radio stations in Canada. In 1931, it moved to 580 AM, and then to its final AM frequency at 630 in 1933.

Originally known as "The Friendly Voice of the Maritimes", the location in the centre of the Gulf of St. Lawrence allowed CFCY's 5,000-watt daytime signal to reach portions of Newfoundland and Labrador, Quebec and New England as well as most of the Maritime provinces.

The station has roots in traditional country music, bringing "Don Messer" to national recognition throughout the 1940s and 1950s. National broadcasts over the CBC network from CFCY led to the Messer group gaining stature as the "most popular group in Canada during the mid-20th century", eventually helping the group make their successful jump from radio to television.

Rogers wanted to expand into television, but died in 1954. His company, Island Broadcasting, passed on to his family including his widow Flora, and daughter Betty Rogers Large as well as son-in-law Bob Large. They brought television to the Island when CFCY-TV launched on July 1, 1956.

The CFCY stations were both CBC affiliates. However, in 1969, CFCY-TV was sold directly to the CBC as CBCT-TV.

After celebrating 50 years of broadcasting in 1974, The radio station stopped being a CBC affiliate in 1977, when the company opened CBCT-FM in Charlottetown; at that time, Island Broadcasting was renamed Eastern Broadcasting. Despite ending its CBC affiliation, the station continued to keep some content from CBC Radio until 1983, when the station began running an adult contemporary music format. During that span, the station was sold to Maritime Broadcasting in 1986.

As a change from the varied mix of music, a weekly community feature, "Farm Radio Forum", was produced by the Prince Edward Island Federation of Agriculture. The staff would also interview tourist as they waited for the ferry after visiting the Island. The station's format saw very little competition until the arrival of FM radio which led to rebranding in a country music format in 1996.

On March 24, 2006, approval from the CRTC was given for CFCY to switch over to the FM band. In September 2006, CFCY made its switch to FM with permission to simulcast the new station on the old 630 AM signal for 90 days and to cease operations on the AM signal afterwards.

In December 2006, the audio feed for CFCY at 630 has ceased operations. However, an open carrier remained on the air at 630 AM which had some wondering if it was CFCY or a pirate taking over the FM frequency. No link was established between this open carrier at 630 AM and the mysterious toned-down stations being widely recognizable throughout North America in late November. In January 2007, it was finally realized that the CFCY AM transmitter simply had not been turned off.

== People ==
On-air personalities are Adam Ramsay (Mornings), Jon Matthews (Afternoons), and Darren MacPherson (Saturday Night Hoedown). Announcers from the recent past include Chris Pride, Kris MacDonald, Alex Firth, Stephanie Davey, Paul Alan, Rebecca Black, and Nick Young.

Loman McAulay was one of many people who had lengthy careers with the station, from the 1940s until his death in 1987. Betty Rogers Large spent over 60 years at the station in various capacities—one of the longest careers in Canadian broadcasting history. She first appeared on-air in 1925 at age 12. Her history of broadcasting on PEI, "Out of Thin Air", was published in 1989.

Some other notable long term on-air personalities from years past are Colin McAulay, Jim "Jimbo" Cross, JP Gaudet, Dave Holland, Rick Green, Bill MacEwen and his son Gregg MacEwen, Paul Alan, Mike Brooks, Lee Drake and Chris "Punch" Andrews.

== See also ==
- CHLQ-FM
- CJRW-FM
