= CBAX-FM =

Radio station in Halifax, Nova Scotia, Canada

- Halifax, Nova Scotia; Canada
- Broadcast area: Halifax metropolitan area
- Frequency: 91.5 MHz

Programming
- Format: Public Music
- Network: Ici Musique

Ownership
- Owner: Canadian Broadcasting Corporation

History
- First air date: 2002
- Call sign meaning: Canadian Broadcasting Corporation Atlantic X

Technical information
- ERP: 77,500 watts (horizontal polarization)
- HAAT: 224.1 metres (735 ft)

Links
- Website: ICI Musique

CBAX-FM is a Canadian radio station, which broadcasts Radio-Canada's Ici Musique network at 91.5 FM in Halifax, Nova Scotia. It was launched in 2002. CBAX's studios are located on Chebucto Road in Halifax, while its transmitter is located on Washmill Lake Drive in Clayton Park.

== Transmitters ==
The CBC also received approval to add transmitters in the following communities:

Rebroadcasters of CBAX-FM
City of licence	Identifier	Frequency	Power	Class	RECNet	CRTC Decision	Notes
Charlottetown, Prince Edward Island	CBAX-FM-1	88.9 FM	32,850 watts	C	Query		46°12′43.92″N 63°20′30.12″W
St. John's, Newfoundland and Labrador (Note: In the 1980s, the 101.9 frequency was assigned to the CKO network, which folded in 1989 before the St. John's station had a chance to open.)	CBAX-FM-2	101.9 FM	90,200 watts	C	Query		47°32′3.84″N 52°47′21.12″W
Yarmouth, Nova Scotia	CBAX-FM-3	106.1 FM	20,500 watts	C	Query	Broadcasting Decision CRTC 2005-450	43°55′58.08″N 66°6′6.12″W
