= CBH-FM =

Radio station in Halifax, Nova Scotia, Canada

- Halifax, Nova Scotia; Canada
- Broadcast area: Halifax Regional Municipality
- Frequency: 102.7 MHz

Programming
- Format: Adult contemporary; AAA; Classical; Jazz; Public broadcasting
- Network: CBC Music

Ownership
- Owner: Canadian Broadcasting Corporation
- Sister stations: CBHA-FM, CBHT-DT

History
- First air date: June 1, 1975
- Call sign meaning: Canadian Broadcasting Corporation Halifax

Technical information
- Licensing authority: CRTC
- Class: C
- ERP: 92,000 watts (horiz.); 0 watts (vert.)
- HAAT: 217.5 metres (714 ft)
- Transmitter coordinates: 44°39′3.6″N 63°39′28.8″W

Links
- Website: cbc.ca/ns

CBH-FM (102.7 FM) is a non-commercial radio station licensed to Halifax, Nova Scotia, Canada. The station was launched on June 1, 1975, and is the CBC Music outlet for Nova Scotia, New Brunswick and Prince Edward Island. CBH-FM's studios are at 7067 Chebucto Road in Halifax, while its transmitter is on Washmill Lake Drive in Clayton Park.

CBH-FM has been the originating station of one local program, Connections with Olga Milosevich. The final episode of Connections aired on June 22, 2012. The program highlighted upcoming cultural events in the Maritimes as well as a wide range of music from the region. This program was able to air primarily because of a gap on the national CBC Music schedule in Atlantic Canada, since some Saturday afternoon network programs are timed to air live in both the Atlantic and Eastern time zones. CBN-FM in St. John's, Newfoundland and Labrador is the only other station to air local programming of this type, however in that case the program is shared with the local CBC Radio One station, whereas Connections was exclusive to CBC Music.

== Rebroadcasters ==
CBH-FM has rebroadcast transmitters in the following communities in Nova Scotia:

Rebroadcasters of CBH-FM
City of licence	Identifier	Frequency	RECNet	CRTC Decision	Notes
Middleton	CBH-FM-1	93.3 FM	Query	88-445	45°4′45.12″N 64°48′51.12″W
Mulgrave	CBH-FM-2	103.1 FM	Query	2001-494	45°35′56.04″N 61°24′43.92″W

CBH-FM also has rebroadcast transmitters around the Maritime Provinces:

Rebroadcasters of CBH-FM
City of licence	Identifier	Frequency	RECNet	CRTC Decision	Notes
Moncton, New Brunswick	CBA-FM	95.5 FM	Query		46°8′36.96″N 64°54′7.92″W
Saint John/Fredericton, New Brunswick	CBZ-FM	101.5 FM	Query		45°28′40.08″N 66°14′3.84″W
Charlottetown, Prince Edward Island	CBCH-FM	104.7 FM	Query	94-759	46°12′43.92″N 63°20′30.12″W
