= List of defunct Canadian television stations =

This is a list of defunct Canadian television stations.

== Defunct Canadian television stations ==
- CBEFT
- CBKST
- CBNLT
- CBYT (TV)
- CFCL-TV
- CFFB-TV
- CFKL-TV
- CFLA-TV
- CFVO-TV
- CFWH-TV
- CHAB-TV
- CHAK-TV
- CHAT-TV
- CHCA-TV
- CHNB-TV
- CHOY-TV
- CITL-DT
- CJBN-TV
- CJFB-TV
- CJIC-TV
- CJSS-TV
- CKBI-TV
- CKNC-TV
- CKNX-TV
- CKOS-TV
- CKRN-DT
- CKRT-DT
- CKSA-DT
- CKX-TV
- CKXT-DT
- PersonaTV – In Persona's largest markets in Ontario, the primary community channel was branded as Persona News #, where # refers to the channel's placement on the cable dial. Such channels were rebranded as Persona News in 2007.
- VE9EC

== See also ==
- List of Canadian specialty channels
- List of Canadian television channels
- List of Canadian television networks
- List of defunct CBC and Radio-Canada television transmitters
- Lists of television stations in North America
- List of television stations in Canada by call sign
