= List of former CBUT-DT transmitters =

This is a list of former CBUT-TV transmitters that were used by the Canadian Broadcasting Corporation to expand the coverage area of a station to include remote rural areas throughout the Canadian province of British Columbia. These transmitters served as rebroadcasters of CBUT's main signal that originates from Vancouver. Due to budget cuts, the CBC decommissioned these transmitters, along with its other 600+ over-the-air analogue television transmission network on July 31, 2012.

Unless otherwise specified, these transmitters have all gone off the air on July 31, 2012.

== Former rebroadcasters ==
=== CBUT Vancouver ===
Callsigns	City of license	Channel	ERP	Notes
CBUT-1	Courtenay	9 (VHF)	625 watts	Began operation June 1962
CBUT-2	Chilliwack	3 (VHF)	590 watts	Began operation May 12, 1966
CBUT-3	Port Alberni	4 (VHF)	10 watts	Began operation December 10, 1966
CBUT-4	Bowen Island	13 (VHF)	10 watts	Began operation in mid-1967
CBUT-5	Squamish	11 (VHF)	5 watts	Began operation in mid-1967
CBUT-6	Hope	7 (VHF)	10 watts	
CBUT-7	Ucluelet	7 (VHF)	54.5 watts	
CBUT-8	Campbell River	3 (VHF)		
CBUT-10	Sayward	4 (VHF)	28 watts	
CBUT-12	Gold River	7 (VHF)	10 watts	
CBUT-13	Woss Camp	12 (VHF)	155 watts	
CBUT-14	Tahsis	9 (VHF)	8.6 watts	
CBUT-16	Alert Bay	11 (VHF)	30.3 watts	
CBUT-17	Port Alice	10 (VHF)	77.4 watts	
CBUT-18	Port McNeill	2 (VHF)	27 watts	
CBUT-19	Port Hardy	6 (VHF)	29.2 watts	
CBUT-20	Coal Harbour	8 (VHF)	7.3 watts	
CBUT-22	Tofino	10 (VHF)	8.9 watts	
CBUT-23	Harrison Hot Springs	13 (VHF)	30 watts	
CBUT-25	Chilliwack	36 (UHF)	5 watts	
CBUT-26	Ruby Creek	25 (UHF)	5 watts	
CBUT-27	Mount McDonald	59 (UHF)	48 watts	
CBUT-28	Sooke	3 (VHF)	5 watts	
CBUT-30	Phoenix	15	740 watts	
CBUT-31	Greenwood	31 (UHF)	60 watts	
CBUT-32	Midway	7 (VHF)	22 watts	
CBUT-33	Rock Creek	33 (UHF)	100 watts	
CBUT-34	Brackendale	35 (UHF)	5 watts	
CBUT-35	Sechelt	18	875 watts	
CBUT-36	Madeira Park	31 (UHF)	334 watts	
CBUT-37	Grand Forks	5 (VHF)	60 watts	
CBUT-38	Kelowna	45 (UHF)		Launched in 2005 after the CBC ended its affiliation with CHBC-TV.
CBUT-39	Braeloch	15 (UHF)		Launched in 2005 after the CBC ended its affiliation with CHBC-TV.
CBUT-40	Penticton	17 (UHF)		Launched in 2005 after the CBC ended its affiliation with CHBC-TV.
CBUT-41	Vernon	18 (UHF)		Launched in 2005 after the CBC ended its affiliation with CHBC-TV.
CBUT-42	Oliver	6 (VHF)		Launched in 2005 after the CBC ended its affiliation with CHBC-TV.
CBUT-43	Salmon Arm	3 (VHF)		Launched in 2005 after the CBC ended its affiliation with CHBC-TV.
CBUT-44	Enderby	26 (UHF)		Launched in 2005 after the CBC ended its affiliation with CHBC-TV.
CBUT-46	Revelstoke	11 (VHF)		Launched after the CBC ended its affiliation with CHBC-TV.

=== CBUAT ===
Callsigns	City of license	Channel	ERP	Notes
CBUAT	Trail	11 (VHF)	3,340 watts	Began operation November 3, 1960
CBUAT-1	Nelson	9 (VHF)	940 watts	Began operation November 26, 1960
CBUAT-2	Castlegar	3 (VHF)	10 watts	Began operation on January 31, 1964
CBUAT-3	Fruitvale	9 (VHF)	85 watts	Began operation July 1967
CBUAT-5	Salmo	10 (VHF)	5 watts	Began operation July 1967
CBUAT-7	Christina Lake	13 (VHF)	110 watts	

=== CBUBT ===
Callsigns	City of license	Channel	ERP	Notes
CBUBT	Cranbrook	10	1,100 watts	Began operation August 6, 1962
CBUBT-1	Canal Flats	12 (VHF)	510 watts	Began operation August 6, 1962
CBUBT-2	Golden	13 (VHF)	11,400 watts	
CBUBT-3	Invermere	2 (VHF)	8.9 watts	
CBUBT-4	Donald Station	3 (VHF)	6 watts	
CBUBT-5	Radium Hot Springs	17 (VHF)	79 watts	
CBUBT-6	Spillimacheen	69 (UHF)	1,640 watts	Began operation February 3, 1973.
CBUBT-7	Cranbrook	10 (VHF)	900 watts	
CBUBT-8	Fernie	21 (VHF)	29.5 watts	
CBUBT-9	Fernie	8 (VHF)	58.5 watts	
CBUBT-10	Sparwood	11 (VHF)		
CBUBT-13	Field	11 (VHF)	30 watts	
CBUBT-14	Moyie	6 (VHF)	76.5 watts	

=== CBUCT ===
Callsigns	City of license	Channel	ERP	Notes
CBUCT	Nelson	9 (VHF)	940 watts	
CBUCT-1	Crawford Bay	5 (VHF)	842 watts	
CBUCT-2	Creston	3 (VHF)	142 watts	
CBUCT-3	Winlaw	12 (VHF)	45 watts	
CBUCT-4	Crescent Valley	33 (UHF)	180 watts	
CBUCT-5	Slocan	39 (UHF)	214.2 watts	
CBUCT-6	New Denver	17 (UHF)	696 watts	

=== CBUHT ===
Callsigns	City of license	Channel	ERP	Notes
CBUHT-1	Purden Lake	10 (VHF)	194 watts	
CBUHT-3	McBride	6 (VHF)	24 watts	
CBUHT-4	Tete Jaune	10	21 watts	
CBUHT-5	Valemount	12 (VHF)	112 watts	

=== CBUIT ===
Callsigns	City of license	Channel	ERP	Notes
CBUIT-1	Bella Bella	13 (VHF)	10 watts	
CBUIT-3	Bella Coola	7 (VHF)	10 watts	
CBUIT-4	Hagensborg	11 (VHF)	10 watts	

=== CBCB-TV ===
Callsigns	City of license	Channel	ERP	Notes
CBCB-TV-1	Vanderhoof	18 (UHF)	10 watts	Originally a repeater of now-CityTV affiliate CKPG-TV in Prince George when it was a private CBC affiliate; became a CBUT repeater in 2008 when CKPG joined the CH television system.
CBCB-TV-2	Fort Fraser	13 (VHF)	35 watts	Originally a repeater of now-CityTV affiliate CKPG-TV in Prince George when it was a private CBC affiliate; became a CBUT repeater in 2008 when CKPG joined the CH television system.
CBCB-TV-3	Fort St. James	7 (VHF)	5 watts	Originally a repeater of now-CityTV affiliate CKPG-TV in Prince George when it was a private CBC affiliate; became a CBUT repeater in 2008 when CKPG joined the CH television system.

=== CBCD-TV ===
Callsigns	City of license	Channel	ERP	Notes
CBCD-TV-1	Pouce Coupe	7 (VHF)	10 watts	Originally a repeater of present-day CTV2 affiliate CJDC-TV in Dawson Creek. This rebroadcaster was CBC owned, but it repeated CJDC during its tenure as a private CBC affiliate.
CBCD-TV-2	Chetwynd	7 (VHF)	16 watts	Originally a repeater of present-day CTV2 affiliate CJDC-TV in Dawson Creek. This rebroadcaster was CBC owned, but it repeated CJDC during its tenure as a private CBC affiliate.
CBCD-TV-3	Fort St. John	9 (VHF)	180 watts	Originally a repeater of CJDC-TV in Dawson Creek. This rebroadcaster was CBC owned, but it repeated a private CBC affiliate. In December 2017, this transmitter was acquired by Bell Media and reactivated as CJDC-TV-1 to repeat CTV2 programming from CJDC.
CBCD-TV-4	Taylor	12 (VHF)	10 watts	

=== CBCY-TV ===
Callsigns	City of license	Channel	ERP	Notes
CBCY-TV	Houston	2 (VHF)	98 watts	Originally CBCH-TV-1, a repeater of CFTK-TV in Terrace.
CBCY-TV-1	Burns Lake	4 (VHF)	117 watts	Formerly CBCH-TV-2
CBCY-TV-2	Smithers	5 (VHF)	27 watts	Formerly CBCH-TV-3; acquired by Bell Media in 2017 and reactivated as CFTK-TV-2, a repeater of CFTK-TV/Terrace
CBCY-TV-3	Moricetown	4 (VHF)	10 watts	Formerly CBCH-TV-4

=== Other CBUT satellites in British Columbia ===
Callsigns	City of license	Channel	ERP	Notes
CBCG-TV	Princeton	6 (VHF)	5 watts	Formerly CBCV-TV
CBCJ-TV	Blue River	7 (VHF)	10 watts	
CBUDT	Bonnington Falls	13 (VHF)	22 watts	
CBUGT	Fort Nelson	8 (VHF)	50 watts	
CBUO-TV	Bamfield	4 (VHF)	10 watts	
CBUPT	Pemberton	4 (VHF)	41 watts	
CBUWT	Whistler	13	107 watts	

=== CBUT programming on CBC North stations ===
From 1973 on, through the facilities of the Anik Telecommunications Satellite, these transmitters in the Northwest Territories, along with the repeaters of CFYK-TV/Yellowknife, Northwest Territories, and the now-defunct CFWH-TV/Whitehorse, Yukon and CHAK-TV in Inuvik, Northwest Territories, aired some of CBUT's programming as part of the CBC North television service transmitters, originally known as the Frontier Package.

These rebrodcasters, and those of CFYK, CFWH and CHAK received the network feed from CBUT.

Callsigns	City of license	Channel	ERP	Notes
CBEDT	Coppermine	9	10 watts	Existed until 2011
CBEBT	Pine Point	4 (VHF)	3,000 watts	Began broadcasting as CBTE-TV on August 8, 1969
CBELT	Pond Inlet	9 (VHF)	10 watts	

Additionally, prior to 1982, repeater stations CBKAT in Uranium City, Saskatchewan, and CHFC-TV in Churchill, Manitoba, aired some of CBUT's programs on their signals as they were originally part of CBC North. CHFC later became a repeater of CBWT/Winnipeg in 1980, while CBKAT became a repeater of CBKST/Saskatoon in 1982.

== See also ==
- List of former rebroadcasters of CFWH-TV
- List of former rebroadcasters of CFYK-DT
- List of defunct CBC and Radio-Canada television transmitters
