= 1991 in Canadian television =

This is a list of Canadian television related events from 1991.

== Events ==
Date	Event
March 3	12th Genie Awards
March 3	Juno Awards of 1991
March 26	Babar begins airing in the Republic of Ireland on RTÉ Two (as Network 2) as part of the long running children's block The Den.
June 6	The long running music video series for children Hit List starts on YTV.
September 2	Popular British children's stop motion animated series Postman Pat begins transmitting in Canada for the very first time ever on the family cable television network YTV with the series airing on Mondays, Wednesdays and Fridays. Charlie Chalk another stop motion animated series produced by Woodland Animations (the company that used to make Postman Pat) will also begin airing in Canada on YTV on the same week airing on Tuesdays and Thursdays.
September 3	The hit children's series that introduces Thomas the Tank Engine & Friends to the US, Shining Time Station begins airing in Canada for the very first time with the show airing on YTV, thus making it the very first television channel to air the American spin-off of Thomas in Canada.
December 7	A Bunch of Munsch premieres on CTV with a winter special, "Thomas' Snowsuit/50 Below Zero". based on the children's books by the American–Canadian children's author Robert Munsch.
December 19	Australian children's television series Johnson and Friends begins its first ever airing on Canadian television. The series will start its first television broadcasting transmission on Knowledge Network in British Columbia.

=== Debuts ===
Show	Station	Premiere Date
Scales of Justice	CBC Television	January 6
Wil Cwac Cwac	Knowledge Network	January 12
Hillside	YTV	February 3
Fly by Night	CBC Television	April 4
Hit List	YTV	June 6
Eureeka's Castle	Knowledge Network	September 2
The Zone	YTV	September 2
Postman Pat	YTV	September 2
Charlie Chalk	YTV	September 3
Shining Time Station	YTV	September 3
Northwood	CBC Television	September 11
Acting Crazy	Global	September 30
Bookmice	TVOntario	October 1
African Skies	Family	October 11
A Bunch of Munsch	CTV	December 7
Johnson and Friends	Knowledge Network	December 19
The Red Green Show	Global/CBC Television	Unknown

=== Changes of network affiliation ===
Show	Moved from	Moved to
Eureeka's Castle	Knowledge Network	TVOntario
Fireman Sam	Knowledge Network	TVOntario

=== Ending this year ===
Show	Station	Cancelled
Degrassi High	CBC Television	January 28
My Secret Identity	CTV	May 25
Wide World of Sports	CTV	September 28
The Comedy Mill	CHCH-TV	Unknown

== Television shows ==
=== 1950s ===
- Country Canada (1954–2007)
- Hockey Night in Canada (1952–present)
- The National (1954–present).
- Front Page Challenge (1957–1995)

=== 1960s ===
- CTV National News (1961–present)
- Land and Sea (1964–present)
- Man Alive (1967–2000)
- Mr. Dressup (1967–1996)
- The Nature of Things (1960–present, scientific documentary series)
- Question Period (1967–present, news program)
- The Tommy Hunter Show (1965–1992)
- W-FIVE (1966–present, newsmagazine program)

=== 1970s ===
- Canada AM (1972–present, news program)
- the fifth estate (1975–present, newsmagazine program)
- Marketplace (1972–present, newsmagazine program)
- Polka Dot Door (1971-1993)
- 100 Huntley Street (1977–present, religious program)

=== 1980s ===
- Adrienne Clarkson Presents (1988–1999)
- CityLine (1987–present, news program)
- CODCO (1987–1993)
- Fashion File (1989–2009)
- Fred Penner's Place (1985–1997)
- Good Rockin' Tonite (1989–1992)
- Katts and Dog (1988–1993)
- The Kids in the Hall (1989–1994)
- The Journal (1982–1992)
- Just For Laughs (1988–present)
- Midday (1985–2000)
- On the Road Again (1987–2007)
- The Raccoons (1985–1992)
- Road to Avonlea (1989–1996)
- Street Legal (1987–1994)
- Under the Umbrella Tree (1986–1993)
- Venture (1985–2007)
- Video Hits (1984–1993)

=== 1990s ===
- Are You Afraid of the Dark? (1990–1996)
- E.N.G. (1990–1994)
- Material World (1990–1993)
- Neon Rider (1990–1995)

== Television stations ==
=== Debuts ===
Date	Market	Station	Channel	Affiliation	Notes/References
March 11	Victoria, British Columbia	Hansard TV	(cable-only)	Independent	Launched as the broadcaster of the Legislative Assembly of British Columbia, available province-wide
Unknown	Halifax, Nova Scotia	Legislative Television	(cable-only)	Government-access Independent	A province-wide broadcaster of the Legislative Assembly of Nova Scotia
Unknown	Saskatchewan Communications Network (SCN)	(cable-only)	A province-wide educational independent television service		

=== Closures ===
Date	Market	Station	Channel	Affiliation	Notes
January 1	Sydney, Nova Scotia	CBIT-TV	5	CBC (O&O)	Became a rebroadcaster of CBHT-TV/Halifax, permanent shut down on July 31, 2012.
February 22	Labrador City, Newfoundland and Labrador	CBNLT	13	CBC (O&O)	Became a rebroadcaster of St. John's-based CBNT-TV, permanent shut down on July 31, 2012.
October 8	Happy Valley-Goose Bay, Newfoundland and Labrador	CFLA-TV	8	CBC (O&O)	Became a rebroadcaster of St. John's-based CBNT-TV, permanent shut down on July 31, 2012.
Unknown	Schefferville, Quebec	CFKL-TV	7	CBC/Radio-Canada	Became CBSET-1, a rebroadcaster of CBSET/Sept-Îles, a semi-satellite of CBMT/Montreal; permanent shut down on July 31, 2012.

== Births ==
Date	Name	Notability
May 6	Shamier Anderson	Actor

== See also ==
- 1991 in Canada
- List of Canadian films of 1991
