= List of radio stations in Nunavut =

The following is a list of radio stations in Nunavut as of 2024.

Stations in Nunavut with call letters beginning with CB and those using call letters CFFB are owned and operated by the Canadian Broadcasting Corporation. The others are owned and operated by local community groups, with the exception of CIQA-FM Iqaluit, the Weatheradio Canada station operated by Environment and Climate Change Canada for the area, and CKIQ-FM and CKGC-FM in Iqaluit, the only commercial radio stations in Nunavut.

Call sign	Frequency	City of Licence	Owner	Format	Notes
CKAB-FM	107.1 FM	Arctic Bay	Atta Suvaguq Society	public news/talk	community-owned CBC North rebroadcaster
CBIG-FM	105.1 FM	Arviat	CBC North	public news/talk	
CKQN-FM	99.3 FM	Baker Lake	Qamanittuap Naaluataa Society	public news/talk	community-owned CBC North rebroadcaster
CFBI-FM	97.7 FM	Cambridge Bay	Cambridge Bay Communications Society	community radio	
CFFB-1-FM	101.9 FM	Cambridge Bay	CBC North	public news/talk	Iqaluit feed
CBIN-FM	105.1 FM	Cambridge Bay	CBC North	public news/talk	Inuvik feed
CICH-FM	93.3 FM	Chesterfield Inlet	Chesterfield Inlet Radio Society	community radio	
CFCI-FM	107.1 FM	Chesterfield Inlet		public news/talk	community-owned CBC North rebroadcaster
CJCR-FM	107.1 FM	Clyde River	Arkunnirmiut Broadcasting Society	public news/talk	community-owned CBC North rebroadcaster
CJZS-FM	107.1 FM	Coral Harbour		public news/talk	community-owned CBC North rebroadcaster
CBIA	640 AM	Gjoa Haven	CBC North	public news/talk	
CFGF-FM	107.1 FM	Grise Fiord		public news/talk	community-owned CBC North rebroadcaster
CBII-FM	105.1 FM	Igloolik	CBC North	public news/talk	
CFFB	1230 AM	Iqaluit	CBC North	public news/talk	
CBM-FM-3	88.3 FM	Iqaluit	CBC Music	public music	
CFFB	91.1 FM	Iqaluit	CBC North	public news/talk	nested FM rebroadcaster
CIQA-FM	93.3 FM	Iqaluit	Weatheradio Canada	weather alerts	
VF2433	97.7 FM	Iqaluit	John Howard Society of Nunavut		
CKIQ-FM	99.9 FM	Iqaluit	Northern Lights Entertainment Inc.	community radio	
CKGC-FM	103.5 FM	Iqaluit	Northern Lights Entertainment Inc.	classic hits	
CFRT-FM	107.3 FM	Iqaluit	Association des francophones du Nunavut	community radio (French)	
No Call Sign	107.1 FM	Kimmirut		public news/talk	community-owned CBC North rebroadcaster
CBIH-FM	105.1 FM	Kinngait	CBC North	public news/talk	
CFPB-FM	107.1 FM	Kugaaruk	Hamlet of Kugaaruk	public news/talk	community-owned CBC North rebroadcaster
CKUG-FM	88.7 FM	Kugluktuk	Kugluktuk Radio Society	community radio	
CFFB-2-FM	101.9 FM	Kugluktuk	CBC North	public news/talk	Iqaluit feed
CBIO-FM	105.1 FM	Kugluktuk	CBC North	public news/talk	Inuvik feed
VF2061	106.1 FM	Nanisivik		public news/talk	Community no longer exists as mine site closed. Community-owned CBC North rebroadcaster
CINJ-FM	90.1 FM	Naujaat			
VF2046	107.1 FM	Naujaat		public news/talk	community-owned CBC North rebroadcaster
CBIJ-FM	105.1 FM	Pangnirtung	CBC North	public news/talk	
CBIK-FM	105.1 FM	Pond Inlet	CBC North	public news/talk	
No Call Sign	107.1 FM	Qikiqtarjuaq		public news/talk	community-owned CBC North rebroadcaster
CHAR-FM	92.7 FM	Rankin Inlet	James Sandy		
VF2410	97.9 FM	Rankin Inlet	Municipality of Rankin Inlet		
CBQR-FM	105.1 FM	Rankin Inlet	CBC North	public news/talk	
CBIL-FM	105.1 FM	Resolute	CBC North	public news/talk	
CKSN-FM	106.1 FM	Sanikiluaq		public news/talk	community-owned CBC North rebroadcaster
CHYH-FM	90.3 FM	Taloyoak			
CBIQ-FM	105.1 FM	Taloyoak	CBC North	public news/talk	
CKWC-FM	106.1 FM	Whale Cove	Hamlet of Whale Cove	public news/talk	community-owned CBC North rebroadcaster

== See also ==
- Lists of radio stations in North and Central America
