= CFFB =

CFFB may refer to:

- CFFB (AM), a radio station (1230 AM) licensed to Iqaluit, Nunavut, Canada
- CFFB-TV, a former television station (channel 8) licensed to Iqaluit, Nunavut, Canada
