= List of defunct CBC Television and Ici Radio-Canada Télé transmitters =

This is a list of former CBC Television/Ici Radio-Canada Télé transmitters across Canada that were used by the Canadian Broadcasting Corporation. Due to budget cuts, the CBC decommissioned its 620 over-the-air analogue television transmitters on July 31, 2012.

City of License | Network | Callsign | Channel

== Alberta ==
- Athabasca CBC CBXT-1 8
- Banff CBC CBRT-1 5
- Beaverlodge CBC CBXAT-14 4
- Bellevue CBC CBRT-10 57
- Bonnyville SRC CBXFT-1 6
- Burmis CBC CBRT-8 47
- Calgary SRC CBRFT 16
- Cardston CBC CBRT-12 6
- Chateh CBC CBXAT-7 5
- Coleman CBC CBRT-11 17
- Coronation CBC CBXT-14 10
- Coutts/Milk River CBC CBRT-16 4
- Cowley CBC CBRT-15 27
- Daysland CBC CBXT-11 40
- Drumheller CBC CBRT-14 3
- Drumheller CBRT-2 6
- Etzikom CBC CBCA-TV-1 12
- Falher SRC CBXFT-2 6
- Forestburg CBC CBXT-12 52
- Fort Chipewyan CBC CBXBT 10
- Fort McMurray CBC CBXT-6 9
- Fort McMurray SRC CBXFT-6 12
- Fort Vermilion CBC CBXAT-5 11
- Fox Creek CBC CBXT-7 5
- Fox Lake CBC CBXAT-10 9
- Grande Prairie CBC CBXAT 10
- Grande Prairie SRC CBXFT-8 19
- Harvie Heights CBC CBRT-13 22
- High Level CBC CBXAT-4 8
- High Prairie CBC CBXAT-2 2
- Hinton CBC CBXT-3 8
- Hinton SRC CBXFT-7 3
- Jasper CBC CBXT-4 5
- Jean D'Or CBC CBXAT-9 13
- Lac La Biche CBC CBXT-5 10
- Lake Louise CBC CBRT-4 12
- Lethbridge CBC CBRT-6 10
- Lethbridge SRC CBXFT-3 23
- Manning CBC CBXAT-3 12
- Medicine Hat SRC CBXFT-11 34
- Paddle Prairie CBC CBXAT-6 9
- Peace River CBC CBXAT-1 7
- Peace River SRC CBXFT-5 9
- Pincher Creek CBC CBRT-9 15
- Plamondon/Lac Labich CBC CBXT-8 4
- Plamondon/Lac Labich SRC CBXFT-9 22
- Rainbow Lake CBC CBXAT-8 11
- Red Deer CBC CBXT-13 22
- Red Deer SRC CBXFT-4 31
- Rosemary CBC CBRT-5 11
- Slave Lake CBC CBXAT-11 11
- Wabasca CBC CBXAT-12 7
- Waterton Park CBC CBRT-7 4
- Whitecourt CBC CBXT-2 9

== British Columbia ==
- Alert Bay CBC CBUT-16 11
- Bamfield CBC CBUO-TV 4
- Bella Bella CBC CBUIT-1 13
- Bella Coola CBC CBUIT-3 7
- Blue River CBC CBUJ-TV 7
- Bonnington Falls CBC CBUDT 13
- Bowen Island CBC CBUT-4 13
- Braeloch CBC CBUT-39 15
- Burns Lake CBC CBCY-TV-1 4
- Campbell River CBC CBUT-8 3
- Canal Flats CBC CBUBT-1 12
- Castlegar CBC CBUAT-2 3
- Chetwynd CBC CBCD-TV-2 7
- Chilliwack CBC CBUT-2 3
- Chilliwack CBUT-25 36
- Chilliwack SRC CBUFT-6 14
- Christina Lake CBC CBUAT-7 13
- Coal Harbour CBC CBUT-20 8
- Cranbrook CBC CBUBT-7 10
- Crawford Bay CBC CBUCT-1 5
- Crescent Valley CBC CBUCT-4 33
- Creston CBC CBUCT-2 3
- Dawson Creek SRC CBUFT-5 33
- Donald CBC CBUBT-4 3
- Enderby CBC CBUT-44 26
- Fernie CBC CBUBT-8 21
- Fernie CBUBT-9 8
- Field CBC CBUBT-13 11
- Fort Nelson CBC CBUGT 8
- Fort St John CBC CBCD-TV-3 9
- Fruitvale CBC CBUAT-3 9
- Gold River CBC CBUT-12 7
- Golden CBC CBUBT-2 13
- Grand Forks CBC CBUT-37 5
- Greenwood CBC CBUT-31 31
- Hagensborg CBC CBUIT-4 11
- Harrison Hot Spring CBC CBUT-23 13
- Hope CBC CBUT-6 9
- Houston CBC CBCY-TV 2
- Invermere CBC CBUBT-3 2
- Kamloops SRC CBUFT-2 50
- Kelowna CBC CBUT-38 45
- Kelowna SRC CBUFT-1 21
- Kitimat SRC CBUFT-7 8
- Madeira Park CBC CBUT-36 31
- Mcbride CBC CBUHT-3 6
- Midway CBC CBUT-32 7
- Moricetown CBC CBCY-TV-3 4
- Moyie CBC CBUBT-14 6
- Nelson CBC CBUCT 9
- New Denver CBC CBUCT-6 17
- Osoyoos CBC CBUT-42 6
- Pemberton CBC CBUPT 4
- Penticton CBC CBUT-40 17
- Phoenix CBC CBUT-30 15
- Port Alberni CBC CBUT-3 4
- Port Alice CBC CBUT-17 10
- Port Hardy CBC CBUT-19 6
- Port Mcneill CBC CBUT-18 2
- Pouce Coupe CBC CBCD-TV-1 7
- Prince George SRC CBUFT-4 4
- Princeton CBC CBRG-TV 6
- Purden Lake CBC CBUHT-1 10
- Radium Hot Springs CBC CBUBT-5 17
- Revelstoke CBC CBUT-46 11
- Rock Creek CBC CBUT-33 33
- Ruby Creek CBC CBUT-26 25
- Salmo CBC CBUAT-5 10
- Salmon Arm CBC CBUT-43 3
- Sayward CBC CBUT-10 4
- Sechelt CBC CBUT-35 18
- Slocan CBC CBUCT-5 39
- Smithers CBC CBCY-TV-2 5
- Sooke CBC CBUT-28 3
- Sparwood CBC CBUBT-10 11
- Squamish/Bracken CBC CBUT-5 11
- Squamish/Bracken CBUT-34 35
- Tahsis CBC CBUT-14 9
- Taylor CBC CBCD-TV-4 12
- Terrace SRC CBUFT-3 11
- Tete Jaune CBC CBUHT-4 10
- Tofino CBC CBUT-22 10
- Trail CBC CBUAT 11
- Ucluelet CBC CBUT-7 7
- Valemount CBC CBUHT-5 12
- Vernon CBC CBUT-41 18
- Whistler CBC CBUWT 13
- Winlaw CBC CBUCT-3 12
- Woss Camp CBC CBUT-13 12

== Manitoba ==
- Brandon SRC CBWFT-10 21
- Brochet CBC CBDE-TV 9
- Churchill CBC CHFC-TV 8
- Cross Lake CBC CBWNT 12
- Dauphin CBC CBWST 8
- Easterville CBC CBWHT-2 11
- Fairford CBC CBWGT-2 7
- Fisher Branch CBC CBWGT 10
- Flin Flon CBC CBWBT 10
- Flin Flon SRC CBWFT-2 3
- Gillam CBC CBWLT 8
- Gods Lake Narrows CBC CBWXT 13
- Grand Rapids CBC CBWHT 8
- Jackhead CBC CBWGT-1 5
- Lac Du Bonnet CBC CBWT-2 4
- Leaf Rapids CBC CBWQT 13
- Little Grand Rapids CBC CBWZT 9
- Lynn Lake CBC CBWRT 8
- Mafeking CBC CBWYT 2
- Manigotagan CBC CBWGT-3 22
- Mccusker Lake CBC CBWUT 10
- Moose Lake CBC CBWIT-1 9
- Nelson House CBC CBWPT 11
- Norway House CBC CBWOT 9
- Oak Lake SRC CBWFT-12 32
- Oxford House CBC CBWVT 8
- Pine Falls SRC CBWFT-6 11
- Piney CBC CBWT-3 29
- Poplar River CBC CBDI-TV 13
- Pukatawagan CBC CBWBT-1 11
- Shamattawa CBC CBDG-TV 9
- Snow Lake CBC CBWKT 8
- South Indian Lake CBC CBWQT-1 10
- Ste Rose Du Lac SRC CBWFT-4 3
- St-Lazare SRC CBWFT-3 13
- The Pas CBC CBWIT 7
- The Pas SRC CBWFT-1 6
- Thompson CBC CBWTT 7
- Thompson SRC CBWFT-5 5
- Waasagomach CBC CBWWT 9
- Wabowden CBC CBWMT 10

== New Brunswick ==
- Allardville SRC CBAFT-3 3
- Boiestown CBC CBAT-TV-6 13
- Bon Accord CBC CBAT-TV-1 6
- Campbellton CBC CBAT-TV-4 4
- Campbellton SRC CBAFT-7 9
- Doaktown CBC CBAT-TV-5 8
- Edmundston SRC CBAFT-2 13
- Fredericton SRC CBAFT-1 5
- Fredericton CBAFT-10 19
- Grand Falls SRC CBAFT-4 12
- Kedgwick SRC CBAFT-9 44
- Miramichi CBC CBAT-TV-3 6
- Moncton CBC CBAT-TV-2 7
- Saint John CBC CBAT-TV 4
- St-Quentin SRC CBAFT-8 21

== Newfoundland and Labrador ==
- Baie Verte CBC CBNAT-1 3
- Baie Verte CBNAT-24 12
- Bay L'Argent CBC CBNT-27 8
- Belleoram CBC CBNT-23 7
- Bonne Bay CBC CBYT-3 2
- Brent's Cove CBC CBNAT-18 10
- Buchans CBC CBNAT-2 13
- Carmanville CBC CBNAT-7 7
- Cartwright CBC CBNT-21 9
- Churchill Falls CBC CBNLT-1 9
- Churchill Falls SRC CBFT-11 13
- Clarenville CBC CBNT-10 7
- Coachman's Cove CBC CBNAT-16 8
- Conche CBC CBNAT-8 12
- Corner Brook CBC CBYT 5
- Cow Head CBC CBYT-6 8
- Deer Lake CBC CBYAT 12
- Elliston CBC CBNT-7 4
- Fermeuse CBC CBNT-5 11
- Ferryland CBC CBNT-38 4
- Fleur De Lys CBC CBNAT-20 5
- Fogo Island CBC CBNAT-6 2
- Fortune CBC CBNT-33 9
- Fox Harbour CBC CBNAT-10 7
- Gambo CBC CBNT-14 8
- Gillams CBC CBYT-12 13
- Glovertown CBC CBNT-13 3
- Goose Bay CBC CFLA-TV 8
- Grand Falls CBC CBNAT 11
- Hampden CBC CBNAT-23 13
- Harbour Breton CBC CBNT-22 13
- Harbour Le Cou CBC CBYT-10 5
- Harbour Mille CBC CBNT-29 13
- Harbour Round CBC CBNAT-19 12
- Hawke's Bay CBC CBYT-9 4
- Hermitage CBC CBNT-24 4
- Hickman's Harbour CBC CBNT-18 4
- Hopedale CBC CBNHT 9
- Irishtown CBC CBYT-2 7
- La Scie CBC CBNAT-21 9
- Labrador City CBC CBNLT 13
- Labrador City SRC CBFT-12 11
- Lamaline CBC CBNT-35 18
- Lark Harbour CBC CBYT-13 3
- Lawn CBC CBNT-36 6
- Little Heart's Ease CBC CBNT-8 11
- Lord's Cove CBC CBNT-34 9
- Lumsden CBC CBNT-20 12
- Makkovik CBC CBNMT 9
- Marystown CBC CBNT-3 5
- Millertown CBC CBNAT-5 9
- Ming's Bight CBC CBNAT-14 10
- Mt. St Margaret CBC CBNAT-9 9
- Musgrave Harbour CBC CBNAT-11 9
- Musgravetown CBC CBNT-17 9
- Nain CBC CBNBT 9
- North West Brook CBC CBNT-11 4
- Pacquet CBC CBNAT-17 6
- Petty Harbour CBC CBNT-37 13
- Placentia CBC CBNT-2 12
- Port Au Port SRC CBFNT 13
- Port Aux Basques CBC CBYT-4 3
- Port Blandford CBC CBNT-32 2
- Port Hope Simpson CBC CBNAT-12 12
- Port Rexton CBC CBNT-1 13
- Portland Creek CBC CBYT-8 13
- Postville CBC CBNPT 9
- Ramea CBC CBNT-25 13
- Random Island CBC CBNT-19 43
- Riverhead CBC CBNT-40 16
- Roddickton CBC CBNAT-22 11
- Rose Blanche CBC CBYT-11 9
- Seal Cove CBC CBNAT-15 7
- Springdale CBC CBNAT-13 13
- St Alban's CBC CBNT-4 9
- St Andrew's CBC CBYT-5 6
- St Anthony CBC CBNAT-4 6
- St Bernard's CBC CBNT-30 6
- St Jones Within CBC CBNT-12 9
- St Lawrence CBC CBNT-28 12
- St Mary's CBC CBNT-6 10
- St Vincent's CBC CBNT-26 7
- St. John's SRC CBFJ-TV 4
- Stephenville CBC CBYT-1 8
- Sunnyside CBC CBNT-41 9
- Swift Current CBC CBNT-31 5
- Trepassey CBC CBNT-39 4
- Trinity CBC CBNT-16 2
- Trout River CBC CBYT-7 13
- Wellington CBC CBNT-15 24
- Wesleyville CBC CBNT-9 5
- York Harbour CBC CBYT-14 12

== Nova Scotia ==
- Aspen CBC CBHT-14 5
- Bay St Lawrence CBC CBIT-17 13
- Blue Mountain CBC CBHT-18 5
- Caledonia CBC CBHT-9 2
- Cheticamp CBC CBIT-2 2
- Cheticamp SRC CBHFT-4 10
- Country Harbour CBC CBHT-15 6
- Digby CBC CBHT-7 52
- Digby SRC CBHFT-6 58
- Dingwall CBC CBIT-16 12
- Garden Of Eden CBC CBHT-19 17
- Goshen CBC CBHT-13 2
- Halifax SRC CBHFT 13
- Ingonish CBC CBIT-15 2
- Inverness CBC CBIT-19 8
- Liverpool CBC CBHT-1 12
- Lochaber CBC CBHT-12 33
- Mabou CBC CBIT-4 10
- Margaree CBC CBIT-5 11
- Middle River CBC CBIT-20 9
- Middleton CBC CBHT-6 8
- Middleton SRC CBHFT-5 46
- Mulgrave CBC CBHT-11 12
- Mulgrave SRC CBHFT-2 7
- New Glasgow CBC CBHT-5 4
- New Glasgow SRC CBHFT-7 15
- North East Margaree CBC CBIT-6 13
- Pleasant Bay CBC CBIT-3 8
- Sheet Harbour CBC CBHT-4 11
- Shelburne CBC CBHT-2 7
- Sherbrooke CBC CBHT-16 4
- Sunnybrae CBC CBHT-17 6
- Sydney CBC CBIT 5
- Sydney SRC CBHFT-3 13
- Truro CBC CBHT-8 55
- Weymouth CBC CBHT-10 24
- Weymouth SRC CBHFT-8 34
- Whycocomagh CBC CBIT-18 10
- Yarmouth CBC CBHT-3 11
- Yarmouth SRC CBHFT-1 3

== Northwest Territories ==
- Aklavik CBC CBEX-TV 13
- Deline CBC CBETT 9
- Fort Good Hope CBC CBEST 9
- Fort Mcpherson CBC CHAK-TV-1 13
- Fort Providence CBC CBEBT-3 13
- Fort Resolution CBC CBEV-TV 9
- Fort Simpson CBC CBEGT 9
- Fort Smith CBC CBEAT 8
- Hay River CBC CBEBT-1 7
- Inuvik CBC CHAK-TV 6
- Norman Wells CBC CBEDT 9
- Rae-Edzo CBC CFYK-TV-1 10
- Tuktoyaktuk CBC CBEPT 8

== Nunavut ==
- Arviat CBC CBEHT 9
- Baker Lake CBC CBEIT 9
- Cambridge Bay CBC CBENT 9
- Cape Dorset CBC CBEJT 9
- Gjoa Haven CBC CBERT 9
- Igloolik CBC CBII-TV 9
- Iqaluit CBC CFFB-TV 8
- Kugluktuk CBC CBEOT 9
- Pangnirtung CBC CBEKT 9
- Pond Inlet CBC CBELT 9
- Rankin Inlet CBC CBECT 9
- Resolute CBC CBEMT 9
- Taloyoak CBC CBEQT 9

== Ontario ==
- Armstrong CBC CBLIT 10
- Atikokan CBC CBWCT-1 7
- Attawapiskat CBC CBLET 12
- Barry's Bay CBC CBOT-2 19
- Beardmore CBC CBLAT-5 9
- Belleville SRC CBLFT-13 15
- Big Trout Lake CBC CBWT-1 13
- Chapleau CBC CBCU-TV 7
- Chapleau SRC CBLFT-22 13
- Chatham CBC CBLN-TV-3 64
- Chatham SRC CBLFT-10 48
- Dryden CBC CBWDT 9
- Dryden SRC CBWFT-9 6
- Dubreuilville SRC CBLFT-24 11
- Ear Falls CBC CBWJT 13
- Elliot Lake CBC CBEC-TV 7
- Elliot Lake SRC CBLFT-6 12
- Espanola SRC CBLFT-7 4
- Fort Albany CBC CBLDT 8
- Fort Frances CBC CBWCT 5
- Fort Frances SRC CBWFT-11 15
- Fort Hope CBC CBLHT 12
- Foymount CBC CBOT-1 14
- Fraserdale CBC CBLCT 7
- Geraldton CBC CBLGT 13
- Geraldton SRC CBLFT-26 7
- Gogama SRC CBLFT-21 12
- Hearst CBC CBCC-TV 5
- Hearst SRC CBLFT-5 7
- Hornepayne CBC CBLAT-6 13
- Huntsville CBC CBLT-TV-2 8
- Ignace CBC CBWDT-2 13
- Kapuskasing CBC CBLT-9 2
- Kapuskasing SRC CBLFT-4 12
- Kearns CBC CBLT-8 2
- Kenora CBC CBWAT 8
- Kenora SRC CBWFT-7 2
- Kingston SRC CBLFT-14 32
- Kitchener CBC CBLN-TV-1 56
- Kitchener SRC CBLFT-8 61
- Little Current CBC CBCE-TV 16
- London CBC CBLN-TV 40
- London SRC CBLFT-9 53
- Manitouwadge CBC CBLAT-1 8
- Manitouwadge SRC CBLFT-25 15
- Marathon CBC CBLAT-4 11
- Mattawa SRC CBLFT-27 26
- Maynooth CBC CBOT-4 51
- Mcarthur's Mills CBC CBOT-5 33
- Moosonee CBC CBCO-TV-1 9
- Nipigon CBC CBLK-TV 16
- Nipigon SRC CBLFT-19 26
- Normandale CBC CBLN-TV-6 44
- North Bay CBC CBLT-4 4
- Osnaburgh CBC CBWDT-4 13
- Parry Sound CBC CBLT-TV-3 18
- Pembroke CBC CBOT-6 3
- Penetanguishene SRC CBLFT-15 34
- Peterborough SRC CBLFT-12 44
- Pickle Lake CBC CBWDT-5 9
- Pikangikum CBC CBWDT-6 7
- Red Lake CBC CBWET 10
- Sandy Lake CBC CBWDT-7 10
- Sarnia-Oil Springs CBC CBLN-TV-2 34
- Sarnia-Oil Springs SRC CBLFT-17 17
- Sault Ste Marie CBC CBLT-5 5
- Sault Ste Marie SRC CBLFT-20 26
- Savant Lake CBC CBWDT-3 8
- Sioux Lookout CBC CBWDT-1 12
- Sioux Narrows CBC CBWAT-1 4
- Sturgeon Falls SRC CBLFT-1 7
- Sudbury CBC CBLT-6 9
- Sudbury SRC CBLFT-2 13
- Temagami CBC CBCQ-TV-1 15
- Thunder Bay SRC CBLFT-18 12
- Timmins CBC CBLT-7 6
- Timmins SRC CBLFT-3 9
- Wawa CBC CBLAT-3 9
- Wawa SRC CBLFT-23 16
- White River CBC CBLAT-2 12
- Whitney CBC CBOT-3 9
- Wiarton CBC CBLN-TV-5 20
- Windsor SRC CBEFT 35
- Wingham CBC CBLN-TV-4 45

== Prince Edward Island ==
- Charlottetown SRC CBAFT-5 31
- Elmira CBC CBCT-2 11
- St Edward CBC CBCT-1 4
- St Edward SRC CBAFT-6 9

== Quebec ==
- Aguanish SRC CBST-7 8
- Alma CBC CBJET-1 32
- Baie-Comeau CBC CBMIT 28
- Baie-Comeau SRC CBST-19 7
- Baie-Johan-Beetz SRC CBST-8 7
- Bearn/Fabre SRC CKRN-TV-3 3
- Beauceville SRC CBVT-6 6
- Blanc-Sablon CBC CBMST 5
- Blanc-Sablon SRC CBST-17 3
- Cap-Chat SRC CBGAT-6 2
- Carleton SRC CBGAT-14 2
- Causapscal SRC CBGAT-5 9
- Chandler CBC CBVB-TV 23
- Chandler SRC CBGAT-15 8
- Chapais SRC CBFAT-1 12
- Chapeau SRC CBOFT-1 11
- Chibougamau CBC CBMCT 4
- Chibougamau SRC CBFAT 5
- Chisasibi CBC CBMGT 12
- Chisasibi SRC CBFGT 9
- Clermont SRC CBSAT 21
- Cloridorme SRC CBGAT-16 8
- Escuminac CBC CBVA-TV 18
- Fermont CBC CBMRT 9
- Fermont SRC CBFT-13 7
- Gaspe CBC CBVG-TV 18
- Gaspe SRC CBGAT-17 9
- Gethsemani SRC CBST-9 9
- Grande-Vallee SRC CBGAT-3 6
- Gros-Morne SRC CBGAT-9 4
- Harrington-Harbour CBC CBMUT 13
- Harrington-Harbour SRC CBST-11 8
- Havre-St-Pierre SRC CBST-1 12
- Ile du Havre Aubert SRC CBIMT-1 16
- Iles-de-la-Madeleine CBC CBMYT 7
- Iles-de-la-Madeleine SRC CBIMT 12
- Inukjuak CBC CBVI-TV 13
- Inukjuak SRC CBFI-TV 9
- Kuujjuaq CBC CBMQ-TV 12
- Kuujjuaq SRC CBFQ-TV 9
- Kuujjuarapik CBC CBMK-TV 12
- Kuujjuarapik SRC CBFK-TV 9
- La Tabatiere CBC CBMLT 10
- La Tabatiere SRC CBST-13 4
- La Tuque CBC CBMET 9
- La Tuque SRC CBFT-14 3
- Lac-Etchemin SRC CBVT-4 55
- Lac-Humqui SRC CBGAT-19 24
- Lac-Megantic SRC CBVT-3 12
- L'Anse-a-Valleau SRC CBGAT-18 10
- Les Mechins SRC CBGAT-23 10
- Longue-Pointe-De-Min SRC CBST-18 6
- Malartic CBC CBVD-TV 5
- Maniwaki CBC CBVU-TV 15
- Manouane SRC CBFT-5 5
- Marsoui SRC CBGAT-8 12
- Matane SRC CBGAT 6
- Mistassini (IR) CBC CBMDT 12
- Mistassini (IR) SRC CBFMT 9
- Mont-Climont SRC CBGAT-1 13
- Mont-Laurier SRC CBFT-2 3
- Mont-Louis SRC CBGAT-10 19
- Mont-Louis CBGAT-4 2
- Mont-St-Michel SRC CBFT-9 16
- Mont-Tremblant SRC CBFT-1 11
- Murdochville CBC CBMMT 21
- Murdochville SRC CBGAT-2 10
- New-Carlisle CBC CBVN-TV 45
- New-Richmond CBC CBVR-TV 27
- Notre-Dame-Des-Monts SRC CBSNT 40
- Notre-Dame-Du-Laus SRC CBOFT-3 10
- Obedjiwan SRC CBFT-6 10
- Old Fort Bay CBC CBMVT 13
- Old Fort Bay SRC CBST-15 7
- Parent SRC CBFT-4 12
- Perce CBC CBVP-TV 14
- Perce SRC CBGAT-20 11
- Port-Daniel CBC CBVF-TV 16
- Port-Daniel CBGAT-21 7
- Povungnituk CBC CBMO-TV 12
- Povungnituk SRC CBFP-TV 9
- Quebec CBC CBVE-TV 11
- Radisson SRC CBFRT 8
- Rapides-des-Joachims SRC CBOFT-2 8
- Riviere-A-Claude SRC CBGAT-13 4
- Riviere-Au-Renard SRC CBGAT-22 2
- Riviere-au-Tonnerre SRC CBST-6 7
- Riviere-St-Paul CBC CBMPT 11
- Riviere-St-Paul SRC CBST-16 21
- Saguenay CBC CBJET 58
- Salluit CBC CBVX-TV 12
- Salluit SRC CBFS-TV 9
- Schefferville CBC CBSET-1 7
- Schefferville SRC CBFT-8 9
- Sept-Iles CBC CBSET 3
- Sept-Iles SRC CBST 13
- Sherbrooke CBC CBMT-3 50
- St-Augustin CBC CBMXT 7
- St-Augustin SRC CBST-14 2
- Ste-Anne-des-Monts SRC CBGAT-11 8
- St-Fabien-de-Panet SRC CBVT-5 13
- St-Marc De Latour SRC CJBR-TV-1 9
- St-Michel-des-Saints SRC CBFT-3 7
- Stoneham SRC CBVT-8 44
- St-Pamphile SRC CBSPT 3
- St-Rene-de-Matane SRC CBGAT-7 30
- Temiscaming SRC CBFST-2 12
- Tete-A-La-Baleine SRC CBST-12 6
- Tewkesbury SRC CBVT-7 7
- Thetford-Mines CBC CBMT-4 32
- Thetford-Mines SRC CBVT-9 21
- Trois-Rivieres CBC CBMT-1 13
- Ville-Marie SRC CKRN-TV-2 6
- Wakeham CBC CBVH-TV 24
- Waskaganish CBC CBMHT 12
- Waskaganish SRC CBFHT 9
- Waswanipi CBC CBVW-TV 8
- Waswanipi SRC CBFV-TV 10
- Wemindji CBC CBMNT 12
- Wemindji SRC CBFWT 9
- Weymont SRC CBFT-7 6

== Saskatchewan ==
- Beauval CBC CBKBT 7
- Bellegarde SRC CBKFT-9 26
- Buffalo Narrows CBC CBKDT 11
- Cumberland House CBC CBWIT-2 9
- Cypress Hills CBC CBCP-TV-2 2
- Debden SRC CBKFT-3 22
- Fond Du Lac CBC CBKAT-2 10
- Fort Qu'Appelle CBC CBKT-3 4
- Gravelbourg CBC CBKGT 45
- Gravelbourg SRC CBKFT-6 39
- Greenwater Lake CBC CBKST-11 4
- Hudson Bay CBC CBKT-10 9
- Ile-Ó-la-Crosse CBC CBKCT 9
- Island Falls CBC CBWBT-2 7
- La Loche CBC CBKDT-2 13
- La Ronge CBC CBKST-2 12
- Leoville CBC CBKST-3 12
- Leoville SRC CBKFT-11 31
- Meadow Lake CBC CBCS-TV-1 8
- Montreal Lake CBC CBKST-5 11
- Moose Jaw CBC CBKT-1 4
- Moose Jaw SRC CBKFT-10 16
- Nipawin CBC CBKST-15 10
- Norquay CBC CBKT-9 13
- North Battleford CBC CBKST-10 7
- North Battleford SRC CBKFT-12 41
- Palmbere Lake CBC CBKDT-1 8
- Patuanak CBC CBKPT 5
- Pelican Narrows CBC CBWBT-3 5
- Pinehouse Lake CBC CBKST-6 10
- Ponteix CBC CBCP-TV-3 3
- Ponteix SRC CBKFT-7 22
- Prince Albert CBC CBKST-9 5
- Prince Albert SRC CBKFT-2 3
- Riverhurst CBC CBKT-5 10
- Saskatoon CBC CBKST 11
- Saskatoon SRC CBKFT-1 13
- Shaunavon CBC CBCP-TV-1 7
- Southend CBC CBKST-8 13
- Spiritwood CBC CBKST-13 2
- St Brieux SRC CBKFT-4 7
- Stanley Mission CBC CBKST-4 8
- Stony Rapids CBC CBKAT-3 7
- Stranraer CBC CBKST-1 9
- Swift Current CBC CBKT-4 5
- Uranium City CBC CBKAT 8
- Warmley CBC CBKT-7 3
- Willow Bunch CBC CBKT-2 10
- Willow Bunch SRC CBKFT-8 21
- Wynyard CBC CBKT-8 6
- Yorkton CBC CBKT-6 5
- Zenon Park SRC CBKFT-5 21

== Yukon ==
- Dawson CBC CBDDT 7
- Elsa CBC CBKHT-1 9
- Faro CBC CBDBT 8
- Mayo CBC CBKHT-2 7
- Watson Lake CBC CBDAT 8
- Whitehorse CBC CFWH-TV 6
- Whitehorse SRC CBFT-15 7
