= CBYT =

CBYT may refer to:

- CBYT (TV), a television rebroadcaster (channel 5) licensed to serve Corner Brook, Newfoundland and Labrador, Canada
- CBYT-FM, a radio retransmitter (104.5 FM) licensed to serve Campbell River, British Columbia, Canada
