= CFWH =

CFWH may refer to:

- CFWH-FM, a radio rebroadcaster (94.5 FM) licensed to Whitehorse, Yukon, Canada; also the former callsign for 104.5 FM in Whitehorse, now CBU-FM-8
- CFWH-TV, a defunct television station (channel 6) licensed to Whitehorse, Yukon, Canada
