= Maamuitaau =

Maamuitaau is a Canadian documentary television series, which has aired on the CBC North service in the Canadian Arctic since 1982. The first Cree language television show, the program airs news and documentary features on Cree culture and communities in the Baie-James region of Quebec.

The series also added a rebroadcast on APTN beginning in 1999.

The program's name means "Let's Get Together" in the Cree language.

== Awards ==
Award	Year	Category	Recipients	Result	Ref.
Gemini Awards	2011	Best Direction in a Documentary Series	Abhish S. Birla, "Song of the River"	Nominated	
Canadian Screen Awards	2025	Best News or Information Series		Nominated	
