= CBQR-FM =

CBC Radio One station in Nunavut, Canada

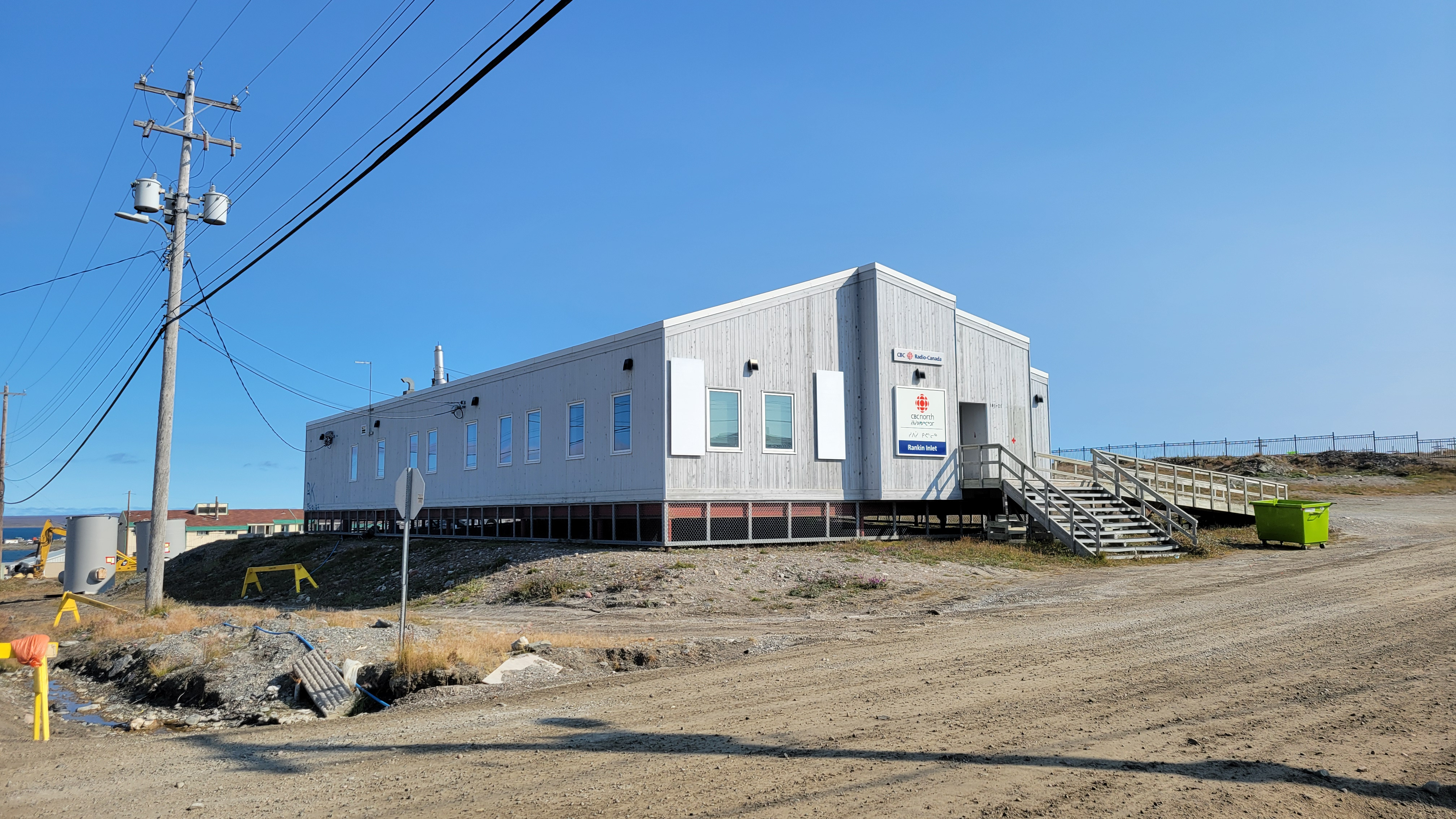
- Rankin Inlet, Nunavut; Canada
- Broadcast area: Kivalliq Region
- Frequency: 105.1 MHz
- Branding: CBC Radio One; CBC North

Programming
- Format: News/Talk

Ownership
- Owner: Canadian Broadcasting Corporation

History
- First air date: 1971
- Former call signs: CBQR (1971–1987)
- Former frequencies: 1110 kHz (1971–1973); 1160 kHz (1973–1987)
- Call sign meaning: Canadian Broadcasting Corporation Q Rankin Inlet

Technical information
- Class: A1
- ERP: 87 watts
- HAAT: 36.5 metres (120 ft)
- Transmitter coordinates: 62°48′27″N 092°04′36″W

Links
- Website: www.cbc.ca/news/canada/north

CBQR-FM is a Canadian radio station, broadcasting at 105.1 FM in Rankin Inlet, Nunavut. It is a station of the Canadian Broadcasting Corporation.

== History ==
The station launched in 1971 when it began broadcasting as CBQR on 1110 kHz. In 1973, CBQR moved to 1160 and remained on that frequency until it moved to 105.1 MHz in 1987.

== Local programming ==
CBQR-FM carries the Nunavut regional radio service of CBC North, much of which originates at CFFB Iqaluit. The afternoon program Tusaajaksat, which focuses on the Kivalliq Region, originates from CBQR. Some of the CBC North regional programs air in both English and Inuktitut, others are only in Inuktitut.

The station also differs significantly from the main CBC Radio One schedule. Qulliq airs until 9 a.m. Central Time and is followed by abbreviated broadcasts of The Current and q. In the afternoons, programming in Inuktitut, including Tausunni from Iqaluit and Tuttavik from the CBC North bureau in Kuujjuaq, Quebec, air in place of the national network programs.

Subsequently, in the evenings, the Inuktitut cultural magazines Ullumi Tusaqsauqaujut and Sinnaksautit air at 9 and 9:30 p.m. Central Time respectively; the Radio One schedule continues at 10 p.m.

== Rebroadcasters ==
Rebroadcasters of CBQR-FM
City of licence	Identifier	Frequency	Power	Class	RECNet	Notes
Arviat	CBIG-FM	105.1 FM	82 watts	A1	Query	61°6′24.84″N 94°3′38.88″W
Gjoa Haven	CBIA	640 AM	40 watts	LP	Query	68°37′36.12″N 95°52′21″W
Taloyoak	CBIQ-FM	105.1 FM	82 watts	A1	Query	69°32′2.04″N 93°33′2.16″W

On September 20, 2019, the CBC received approval to revoke the "originating station" broadcast licence for CBQR and its rebroadcasters. They now officially simulcast CFFB Iqaluit.

== See also ==
- CFFB
