= CFYK-DT =

Television station in Yellowknife

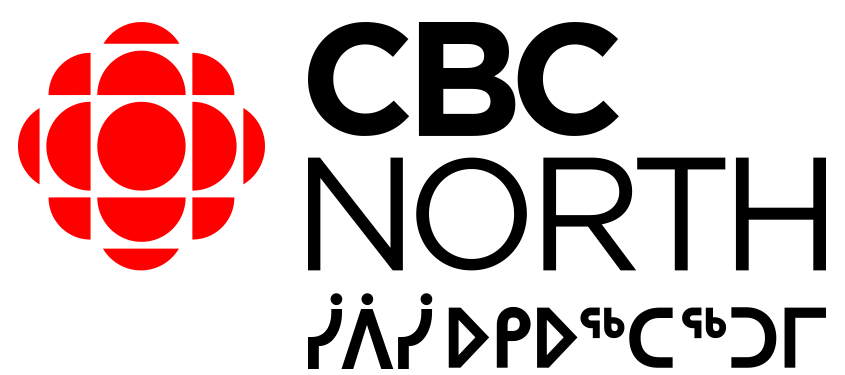
- Yellowknife, Northwest Territories; Canada
- Channels: Digital: 8 (VHF); Virtual: 8
- Branding: CBC North (general); CBC Northbeat (English newscast); CBC Igalaaq (Inuktitut newscast)

Programming
- Affiliations: 8.1: CBC Television

Ownership
- Owner: Canadian Broadcasting Corporation
- Sister stations: CFYK-FM, CFWH-FM, CFFB

History
- First air date: 1967
- Former channel numbers: Analog: 8 (VHF, 1967–2012)
- Call sign meaning: Canada's Finest Yellowknife

Technical information
- Licensing authority: CRTC
- ERP: 2.4 kW
- HAAT: 62.5 m (205 ft)
- Transmitter coordinates: 62°26′50″N 114°21′37″W

Links
- Website: CBC North

CFYK-DT (channel 8) is a CBC Television station in Yellowknife, Northwest Territories, Canada. It is the flagship station of the CBC North television service from the Canadian Broadcasting Corporation. CFYK-DT's studios are located on Forrest Drive in the Frame Lake neighborhood of south Yellowknife, and its transmitter is located atop Tin Can Hill southwest of the city.

== History ==
The station signed on in 1967 as the first television station in northern Canada, and the first station to be part of the CBC's Frontier Coverage Package; satellite delivery of colour television began in 1973.

Prior to 2011, the station was licensed by the Canadian Radio-television and Telecommunications Commission (CRTC) as a "radiocommunication distribution undertaking", meaning that for regulatory purposes it was not a true television station, but merely a transmitter that redistributed CBC North from satellite. The CRTC formally relicensed it as a full television station in February 2011.

CFYK-TV switched to digital broadcasting, flash cutting on VHF 8 (originally VHF 7) with virtual channel 8.1 on August 1, 2012. However, the CBC was not obligated to convert or close down this station, as no part of the Northwest Territories is designated as a mandatory market for digital conversion.

== Transmitters ==
CFYK had nine analog VHF television rebroadcasters in the Northwest Territories. Additionally, CFWH-TV in Whitehorse and CFFB-TV in Iqaluit, though operating as semi-satellites of CFYK with their own networks of rebroadcasters, were actually licensed as rebroadcasters of CFYK.

Due to federal funding reductions to the CBC, in April 2012, the CBC responded with substantial budget cuts, which included shutting down CBC's and Radio-Canada's remaining analog transmitters on July 31, 2012. None of CBC or Radio-Canada's rebroadcasters were converted to digital. The only known translators in Arctic Canada that are known to still be in service are owned and operated by local community groups or local governments. However, few residents actually lost access to CBC programming due to the extremely high penetration of cable and satellite, which is all but essential for acceptable television in much of the Arctic.

Former transmitters of CFYK-DT
Callsign	City of license	Channel
CBEX-TV	Aklavik	5
CBETT	Deline	9
CBEST	Fort Good Hope	9
CBEBT-3	Fort Providence	13
CBEV-TV	Fort Resolution	9
CBEGT	Fort Simpson	9
CBEAT (Note: Began broadcasting as CBTE-TV-4 on June 27, 1969.)	Fort Smith	8
CBEBT-1	Hay River	7
CBEDT	Norman Wells	9
CFYK-TV-1	Rae-Edzo	10
