= CBC North =

Radio and television services in Canada

CBC North; ICI Grand Nord; ᓰᐲᓰ ᐅᑭᐅᖅᑕᖅᑐᒥ; ᓰᐲᓰ ᒌᐌᑎᓅᑖᐦᒡ
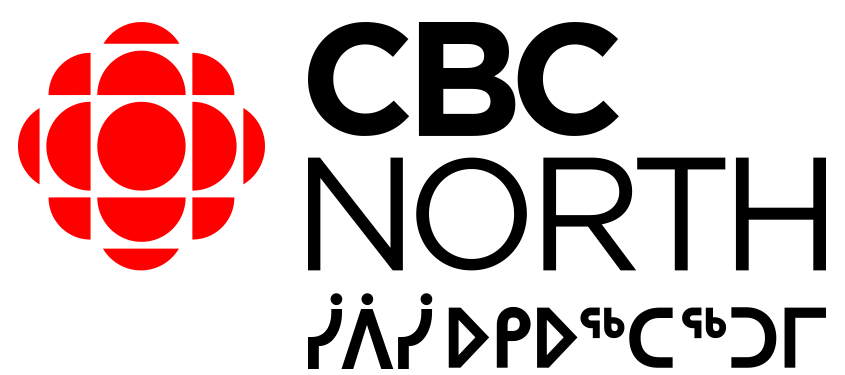

- Type: Broadcast radio network Television system
- Country: Canada
- Headquarters: Yellowknife, Northwest Territories
- Broadcast area: Northwest Territories, Nunavut, Yukon; Eeyou Istchee and Nunavik of Nord-du-Québec
- Owner: Canadian Broadcasting Corporation
- Key people: Mervin Brass, senior managing director
- Launch date: November 10, 1958; 67 years ago (radio); May 14, 1967; 59 years ago (television)
- Former names: CBC Northern Service
- Official website: CBC North

CBC North broadcast centres

CBC North (Inuktitut: ᓰᐲᓰ ᐅᑭᐅᖅᑕᖅᑐᒥ, romanized: SiiPiiSii Ukiuqtaqtumi, lit. 'CBC Northwest'; Cree: ᓰᐲᓰ ᒌᐌᑎᓅᑖᐦᒡ, romanized: SiiPiiSii Chiiwetinuutaahch; French: ICI Grand Nord) is the Canadian Broadcasting Corporation's radio and television service for the Northwest Territories, Nunavut, and Yukon of Northern Canada as well as Eeyou Istchee and Nunavik in the Nord-du-Québec region of Quebec.

== History ==
The genesis of CBC North began in 1923 when the Royal Canadian Corps of Signals established a radiotelegraph system linking Dawson City and Mayo in Yukon with Alaska, British Columbia, and Alberta. Other settlements in Northern Canada were soon connected, forming the Northwest Territories & Yukon (NWT&Y) Radio System.

While the original purpose of the NWT&Y Radio System was to provide a means of communication among military personnel and commercial interests in far-flung corners of remote Northern Canada, the system came to be used for the transmission of general information and entertainment to the civilian population as well. Over the subsequent three decades, this ancillary role of the NWT&Y Radio System led to the development of low-power AM community radio stations at sites where NWT&Y radiotelegraph stations were located.

Most of these radio stations were operated on a volunteer basis by members of the Canadian Armed Forces as well as civilians residing in the communities the stations served. In addition to local programming, the stations often aired recordings provided by the United States Armed Forces Radio Service—owing to the US military presence in several Arctic settlements at the time—and also a limited amount of CBC programming relayed via the NWT&Y Radio System.

In late 1952, the Armed Forces Radio Service ceased deliveries of programming to several of the radio stations. Efforts were then made to expand the reach of CBC programming in Northern Canada by utilizing the resources of the CBC's Troop Broadcast Service, which was originally developed to distribute recordings of CBC radio programming to Canadian military units stationed overseas.

The domestic distribution of CBC radio recordings began in January 1953 with CFGB in Goose Bay, Labrador (now Happy Valley-Goose Bay, Newfoundland and Labrador) receiving an initial shipment of 53 discs that would then be sent to CHFC in Churchill, Manitoba; and then to CFWH in Whitehorse, Yukon. The program was immediately popular and quickly expanded to include CFYT (Note: The present-day CFYT-FM in Dawson City was established in 1983 and—aside from the call letters—is unrelated to the original CFYT.) in Dawson City, Yukon; CHFN in Fort Nelson, British Columbia; and CHAK in Aklavik, Northwest Territories.

Having to be shipped from Montreal, where they were recorded, the discs proved to be too fragile, so were replaced by tapes in April 1953, along with a promise that stations would receive six hours of CBC programming each day.

By 1958, the Department of National Defence desired to reduce its role in maintaining broadcasting infrastructure in Northern Canada. Meanwhile, as an outgrowth of the 1957 Report of the Royal Commission on Broadcasting (also known as the Fowler Commission), the CBC proposed operating a "northern service" of up to twelve radio stations, in part by converting existing stations operated by volunteers into stations staffed by CBC employees. One of the primary reasons cited for the necessity of such a service was that radio listeners in the North could often more readily hear broadcasts from Radio Moscow and the Voice of America than from Canadian sources.

The CBC's proposal was presented to the Parliament of Canada and approved in June 1958. On November 10, 1958, the Northern Service came into being when the CBC formally took over the operations of CFWH in Whitehorse and made it a part of the Trans-Canada Network.

Over the next two years, the CBC would take over the operations of seven other stations, listed below in chronological order:

- CFYT – Dawson City, Yukon (November 13, 1958)
- CFYK – Yellowknife, Northwest Territories (December 13, 1958)
- CFGB – Goose Bay, Labrador (February 23, 1959)
- CBXH (Note: The CBXH call letters are now used in Alberta by a relay transmitter of CBX.) – Fort Smith, Northwest Territories (May 29, 1959)
- CFHR – Hay River, Northwest Territories (September 7, 1959)
- CHFC – Churchill, Manitoba (September 13, 1959)
- CHAK (Note: CHAK began broadcasting from Aklavik in 1947; upon being taken over by the CBC, the station’s studio and transmitter were moved to Inuvik.) – Inuvik, Northwest Territories (November 26, 1960)

Of the eight inaugural stations, studio facilities were retained only in Churchill, Goose Bay, Inuvik, Whitehorse, and Yellowknife. The Dawson City, Fort Smith, and Hay River stations were converted into unattended relay transmitters. Similar relays were built during 1959 at Fort Nelson in British Columbia and Watson Lake in Yukon. As the service took its present form, numerous additional relay transmitters would be added throughout its service area.

In conjunction with the CBC taking over the stations, delivery of programming slowly began to be transitioned away from tape recordings and toward direct links to the CBC network via an expanding Canadian National Telegraph (CNT) system, which, in 1959—under the authority of the Department of Transport—had become the successor of the NWT&Y Radio System. Additionally, shortwave broadcasting started to be used in 1960 when the CBC's shortwave transmitter complex in Sackville, New Brunswick, began airing programming specifically intended for Northern Canada.

The CBC constructed CFFB in Frobisher Bay, Northwest Territories (now Iqaluit, Nunavut), and began operations on February 5, 1961, adding it to the Northern Service. The new station had local programming in Inuktitut, English and French, as well as news and other programs from the CBC network.

Television became a component of the Northern Service in 1967 when the CBC introduced the Frontier Coverage Package, a service in which the CBC Delay Centre in Calgary would record onto videotape four hours daily of CBC Television programming and send the recordings to remote communities in Northern Canada for playback over local television facilities. The programming did not arrive at all facilities simultaneously, but was instead sent to one facility, which, after playback, would send it to another, and so on, until all facilities had gotten a chance to air it. This process meant that programming could be up to a month old by the time it aired. On May 14, 1967, CFYK-TV in Yellowknife became the first television station to partake in this service.

With the advent of the Anik series of satellites in 1973, the CBC began transmitting its television programming on satellite. For Northern Canada, this meant the ability to view the full CBC Television schedule live with the rest of Canada for the first time. The Frontier Coverage Package was discontinued, and all remote northern communities with a population of 500 or more were offered a live television relay transmitter as part of the CBC's Accelerated Coverage Plan of 1974. The governments of the Northwest Territories and Yukon would later supplement this plan by installing additional relay transmitters in communities of less than 500 people.

Radio was affected by the transition to satellite broadcasting as well, since a feed of CBC Radio originating in Toronto was carried via satellite for reception at local CBC production centres. By 1976, CFFB was utilizing this feed not only to obtain live CBC Radio programming, but also to distribute a separate satellite feed to eleven relay transmitters in Inuit Nunangat that combined the output from Toronto with CFFB's own local programming in Inuktitut and English.

For the first fifteen years of CBC North, most of the service's radio stations with studios produced very little of their own programming. Instead, regional programming targeting the North was largely produced in southern Canada, particularly Montreal. This gradually began to change in the 1970s following the Northern Broadcasting Plan of 1974, which outlined goals for the CBC to establish and grow local radio programming in Northern Canada, including programming in Indigenous languages. This goal was further reiterated with the Government of Canada's Northern Broadcasting Policy of 1983.

To facilitate increased local radio productions, a radio production centre was opened at CBQR in Rankin Inlet in 1979 to serve the Keewatin Region of the Northwest Territories (now mostly the Kivalliq Region of Nunavut). A similar centre was opened in Kuujjuaq, Quebec, in 1985 to serve Nunavik. By 1988, the CBC's production centres in the North were collectively producing 220 hours of regional radio programming per week, of which 100 hours were in seven Indigenous languages.

On television, the first CBC production centre inside the CBC North service area opened at CFYK-TV in Yellowknife in 1979, producing Our Ways, a monthly news magazine. An additional television production unit was established in Whitehorse in 1986, and in Iqaluit in 1987 when production of the weekly program Taqravut moved there.

The 1980s also saw the creation of new Indigenous-led broadcasting organizations in Northern Canada, some of which were permitted to use CBC North to broadcast their programming. For example, until the launch of Television Northern Canada in 1992, the Inuit Broadcasting Corporation aired programming during allocated time slots within the CBC North television schedule. On radio, programming from the James Bay Cree Communications Society and Taqramiut Nipingat aired on local CBC North relay transmitters and CKCX until the 2000s, when both organizations launched their own independent radio networks.

In 1992, after being located in Ottawa since the establishment of CBC North, the service's regional head office was moved to Yellowknife.

CKCX and its associated shortwave broadcasting facilities were shut down on December 1, 2012, following a significant budget cut to Radio Canada International, the operator of the facilities. To compensate for the loss of CBC North radio coverage this caused in northern Quebec, FM relay transmitters were installed in five communities of Nunavik, including the production centre of Kuujjuaq.

By 2018, CBC North was broadcasting 211 hours per week of regional programming, including 125 hours per week in eight Indigenous languages.

== Radio ==
As part of the CBC Radio One network, CBC North radio stations carry national programming in English along with regional and local programming in English, French, and the following eight Indigenous languages: Chipewyan, Cree (East Cree), North and South Slavey, Gwich'in, Inuktitut, Inuvialuktun, and Tlicho. The shows include news, weather, and entertainment, providing service to the many Indigenous people of Northern Canada whose first language is not English.

=== Nord-du-Québec ===
==== Nunavik ====
CFFB-FM-5
- Kuujjuaq, Quebec; Canada
- Broadcast area: Nunavik
- Frequency: 103.5 MHz
- Branding: CBC Radio One; CBC North

Programming
- Format: News/Talk

Ownership
- Owner: Canadian Broadcasting Corporation

History
- First air date: 2012

Technical information
- Class: LP
- ERP: 50 watts
- HAAT: 10 m (33 ft)
- Transmitter coordinates: 58°6′32.04″N 68°24′39.96″W

Links
- Website: www.cbc.ca/news/canada/north

In the Nunavik region of Northern Quebec, CBC North is heard on a single-frequency network of low-power FM transmitters whose main station is CFFB-FM-5 in Kuujjuaq. This network was established in 2012 to partially replace coverage lost when Taqramiut Nipingat converted its network of CBC North relay transmitters into an independent network and when shortwave broadcasts through CKCX ended.

These stations broadcast the same regional and local programing heard on CFFB in Nunavut, with the exception of the Sunday Request Show. Additionally, on weekday mornings, they broadcast a portion of Daybreak Montreal, produced in English at CBME-FM in Montreal, as well as a portion of Quebec AM, produced in English at CBVE-FM in Quebec City.

Rebroadcasters of CFFB-FM-5
City of licence	Identifier	Frequency	Power	RECNet	Notes
Inukjuak	CFFB-FM-6	103.5 FM	50 watts	Query	58°27′27″N 78°6′19.08″W
Kuujjuarapik	CFFB-FM-4	103.5 FM	50 watts	Query	55°16′46.92″N 77°45′3.96″W
Puvirnituq	CFFB-FM-8	103.5 FM	50 watts	Query	60°2′21.12″N 77°16′26.04″W
Salluit	CFFB-FM-7	103.5 FM	50 watts	Query	62°12′11.88″N 75°38′8.88″W

==== Eeyou Istchee ====
CBMP-FM
- Chisasibi, Quebec; Canada
- Broadcast area: Eeyou Istchee
- Frequency: 105.1 MHz
- Branding: CBC Radio One; CBC North

Programming
- Format: News/Talk

Ownership
- Owner: Canadian Broadcasting Corporation

History
- First air date: 2020

Technical information
- Class: A1
- ERP: 105 watts
- HAAT: 5 m (16 ft)
- Transmitter coordinates: 53°46′44.04″N 78°53′25.08″W

Links
- Website: www.cbc.ca/news/canada/north

In Eeyou Istchee, CBMP-FM in Chisasibi and its rebroadcasters primarily follow the schedule of CBVE-FM in Quebec City, but substitute three hours of programming in East Cree each weekday for programming in English. The Cree content consists of Winschgaoug ("get up") in the morning and afternoon and Eyou Dipajimoon ("Cree stories") at midday. Both programs are produced by the CBC North Cree unit in Montreal. Before 2020, these programs aired in this region on CBFG-FM, an Ici Radio-Canada Première station that also aired the now-cancelled regional French programs Soirée boréale and Boréal hebdo.

Rebroadcasters of CBMP-FM
City of licence	Identifier	Frequency	Power	RECNet	Notes
Mistissini	CBVS-FM	101.5 FM	77 watts	Query	50°25′0.84″N 73°52′22.08″W
Wemindji	CBMW-FM	105.1 FM	105 watts	Query	53°0′11.16″N 78°48′56.16″W
Waskaganish	CBMQ-FM	105.1 FM	112 watts	Query	51°29′12.12″N 78°44′44.88″W
Waswanipi	CBVW-FM	105.1 FM	106 watts	Query	49°41′40.92″N 75°58′6.96″W

=== Northwest Territories ===
In the Northwest Territories, there are two main stations: CFYK-FM in Yellowknife, serving the southeast, and CHAK in Inuvik, serving the northwest.

==== Yellowknife ====
Programming produced in English at CFYK-FM includes the weekday morning show The Trailbreaker and the weekday afternoon show Trail's End, both of which air throughout the Northwest Territories. Indigenous language productions on weekdays include Tide Godi ("great lake news") in Tlicho, Dehcho Dene in South Slavey, and Denesuline Yatia in Chipewyan. On Saturday afternoons, CFYK-FM produces Dene Yati, a summary of the week's news in multiple Indigenous languages.

==== Inuvik ====
CHAK produces the English language midday program Northwind on weekdays, airing throughout the Northwest Territories. Indingeous language productions on weekdays include Nantaii ("country road") in Gwich'in, Legot'sedeh ("locality and land") in North Slavey, and Tusaavik ("listening place") in Inuvialuktun. On Sunday afternoons, CHAK produces the Gwich'in language call-in show Voice of the Gwich'in, broadcasting it in both the Northwest Territories and Yukon.

=== Nunavut ===
The Nunavut service with its main station CFFB in Iqaluit is the only local or regional CBC Radio service which covers three time zones (Eastern, Central, and Mountain). On weekdays, CFFB produces Qulliq ("oil lamp") in the morning and Nipivut ("our voices") at midday. Both programs are bilingual, containing English and Inuktitut elements. Meanwhile, CBQR-FM in Rankin Inlet contributes the English and Inuktitut program Tusaajaksat ("things heard about") on weekday afternoons.

Programming solely in Inuktitut includes Tausunni ("smell of humans"), produced in Iqaluit on weekday afternoons, and Tuttavik ("place of encounter"), produced at CFFB-FM-5 in Kuujjuaq, Quebec (Nunavik), also on weekday afternoons. Unlike other stations within the CBC Radio One network, CFFB broadcasts regional programming on weekday evenings. This consists of the Indigenous storytelling programs Ullumi Tusaqsauqaujut ("heard today") and Sinnaksautit ("bedtimes").

On weekends, CFFB produces a regional morning program and a music request show, the Sunday Request Show.

=== Yukon ===
On weekdays, CFWH-FM in Whitehorse produces the morning show Yukon Morning, the midday show Midday Café, and the afternoon show Airplay. On weekends, it produces the morning show The Weekender, which also airs in the Northwest Territories. All four programs are in English.

From 5 to 6 p.m. on Saturdays, CBC Radio One airs a local arts programming block. CFWH-FM broadcasts Rencontres, a production in French made by volunteers at the Association franco-yukonnaise in Whitehorse. This program is broadcast through CFWH-FM for the benefit of Franco-Yukonnais outside of Whitehorse, as no other Yukon community is served by an Ici Radio-Canada Première relay transmitter or a local francophone community radio station. Whitehorse itself is served by CFWY-FM, owned by the Association franco-yukonnaise as a relay of CBUF-FM in Vancouver.

=== The Northern Messenger ===
Until the 1970s, the CBC Northern Service featured a mailbag program entitled The Northern Messenger. Letters were sent to CBC studios and read on air to listeners in far-flung settlements. The Northern Messenger functioned as a way to provide residents in remote locations with a means to communicate with friends and family in the south, especially during the winter months, as normal mail delivery was infrequent or non-existent and long-distance telephone networks had not yet reached the region.

The original Northern Messenger was produced by KDKA in Pittsburgh, Pennsylvania, and broadcast from 1923 to 1940 on its "Far Northern Service" shortwave radio simulcaster, 8XS (later known as W8XK and WPIT). Its intended audiences were Royal Canadian Mounted Police officers and other southerners stationed in the Canadian Arctic, to keep them in touch with events in the outside world. KDKA was owned and operated by Westinghouse Electric Corporation and the suggestion for Northern Messenger came from Canadian Westinghouse. The show was broadcast weekly from November to May, when normal mail delivery was unavailable.

On the suggestion of a commander of a British naval expedition based in Nain, Labrador, who wished for his men to receive messages from family and friends, the Canadian Radio Broadcasting Commission (CRBC) began its own version of the service in 1932 under the name Canadian Northern Messenger. Like its American cousin, it consisted of personal messages from friends and family around the world to RCMP officers, missionaries, trappers, doctors, nurses, and scientists as well as Cree and Inuit, and also ran from November to May. It was initially produced by CRCT in Toronto and carried on the CRBC's network of mediumwave and shortwave stations, including CRCX (Bowmanville, Ontario), CJRO/CJRX (Winnipeg), and VE9DN (Drummondville, Quebec). When the Canadian Broadcasting Corporation was formed as the successor to the CRBC, the program was continued by CBC Radio into the 1970s. During its first year, Canadian Northern Messenger relayed 1,754 messages, and would handle six times that many by its fourth year.

Beginning in the 1940s, Northern Messenger would be recorded and broadcast to the Yukon and Northwest Territories on Saturday nights over the NWT&Y Radio System as well as western CBC radio stations CBW Winnipeg, CBX Edmonton, and CBK in Saskatchewan. A rebroadcast would then be done eight days later over CBC's powerful Sackville Relay Station aimed at Labrador, northern Quebec, and the eastern Arctic.

Production of the program took place in Winnipeg in the 1950s and early 1960s, then from Montreal beginning in 1965, a move that also coincided with expanding the program into one that aired on shortwave every weekday throughout the entire year.

== Television ==
The CBC North television production centre and sole terrestrial television transmitter is at CFYK-DT (formerly CFYK-TV) in Yellowknife, with local news bureaus located in Iqaluit and Whitehorse.

Until July 31, 2012, CFFB-TV in Iqaluit, CFWH-TV in Whitehorse, and CHAK-TV in Inuvik operated in association with CFYK-TV. However, following a budget cut that went into effect on that date, the CBC shut down those three stations as well as more than 600 analog television relay transmitters throughout the whole of Canada. In the North, only CFYK-DT and any transmitters owned by local governments or community organizations remained in operation thereafter. Most viewers in the Arctic did not lose access to CBC programming because of the extremely high penetration of cable and satellite.

CFYK-DT broadcasts two half-hour regional newscasts on weekdays, CBC Northbeat (which is primarily presented in English, but also contains stories presented in Indigenous languages with English subtitles), and the Inuktitut-language Igalaaq (ᐃᒐᓛᖅ, "window"). Both programs replaced the previous weekly news magazines Focus North and Aqsarniit in 1995. Igalaaq was anchored by Rassi Nashalik until her retirement in 2014. Northbeat was the only local newscast in English not merged into Canada Now from 2000 to 2006.

In Cree, a current affairs program known as Maamuitaau (ᒫᒯᐄᑖᐤ, "let's get together", starting in 1982) airs on Sundays. This program and the regional newscasts were also broadcast on the Aboriginal Peoples Television Network before the creation of APTN National News.

Upon launch on satellite in 1973, there were two separate CBC North television feeds. CBHT in Halifax, and later CBNT in St. John's, provided an "eastern" feed on an Atlantic Time Zone schedule, while CBUT in Vancouver provided a "western" feed on a Pacific Time Zone schedule. These feeds also served as the master national network signals for CBC Television. Viewers in North America with C band receive-only satellite systems used to be able to receive the two unencrypted analog NTSC feeds until the early 2000s, when the CBC consolidated master control operations to Toronto and Montreal and transitioned to encrypted digital satellite transmissions. The western feed would then be discontinued altogether following the 2012 shutdown of all CBC-owned transmitters in the North except for CFYK-DT. The remaining feed for Yellowknife left C band satellite in 2018, by which time the CBC had connected its production centres to a fiber optic network and, after 45 years, stopped leasing satellite space from Telesat, the owner and operator of the Anik satellites.

== Recordings ==
The CBC Northern Service was a significant source of musical recordings of Inuit and First Nations artists in the 1970s and 1980s. After beginning Inuktitut- and Cree-language broadcasting in northern Quebec, the service saw the need for more musical content. However, initial recordings were done on cassettes, which were of little use to many of the broadcasting stations. The Northern Service began producing vinyl 45 RPM records in 1973. The first session produced singles by Charlie Panigoniak and Mark Etak. A 1975 session recorded singles by Sugluk, from Salluit, Quebec. In the late 1970s, the Northern Service's recording budget was increased, and artists were now flown in for professional recording sessions at the CBC's Montreal offices. Over 120 recordings were made in this period by artists including Morley Loon, William Tagoona, Willie Thrasher, and Alanis Obomsawin. In the mid-1980s, production was moved to Ottawa. The final sessions recorded by the service were in 1986.

Some of these recordings were remastered by Kevin "Sipreano" Howes for the 2014 compilation album Native North America, Vol. 1.
