= CFFB (AM) =

Radio station in Iqaluit, Nunavut, Canada

- Iqaluit, Nunavut; Canada
- Broadcast area: Nunavut
- Frequency: 1230 kHz

Programming
- Format: News/Talk
- Network: CBC Radio One; CBC North

Ownership
- Owner: Canadian Broadcasting Corporation
- Sister stations: CFYK-DT

History
- First air date: February 6, 1961
- Former frequencies: 1200 kHz (1961–1966)
- Call sign meaning: Canada's Finest Frobisher Bay

Technical information
- Class: B
- Power: 1,000 watts
- Transmitter coordinates: 63°44′51″N 068°30′33″W

CFFB is a Canadian radio station, broadcasting at 1230 AM. It operates a nested FM rebroadcasting transmitter, CFFB-FM-3 at 91.1 MHz in Iqaluit, Nunavut. The station broadcasts the programming of the CBC Radio One network, and serves as the regional network centre for Nunavut for the CBC North service.

The local station began broadcasting on February 6, 1961. According to the Canadian Communications Foundation, the station was operating on 1200 kHz by 1966, until the station was approved to move to 1210 in 1971 but was moved to its current frequency at 1230 instead. The FB in the call sign stands for Frobisher Bay, which was renamed Iqaluit in 1987. The station operates from the CBC Iqaluit studios on Queen Elizabeth II Way.

With the advent of the Anik A series of communications satellites in the 1970s, CFFB was transformed from a local station to the regional production centre for northern CBC stations serving Canada's Eastern Arctic. Satellite distribution and the installation of local radio transmitters in most Eastern Arctic communities in the mid-1970s brought Inuktitut and English radio programs produced in Iqaluit, along with network CBC Radio to most communities in what is now Nunavut.

CBC Music service is also provided in Iqaluit, broadcast at 88.3 FM with an effective radiated power of 800 watts. It provides a regular Eastern Time feed of the CBC Music network, with no local program origination. The CBC Music transmitter in Iqaluit is licensed as a rebroadcaster of CBM-FM in Montreal.

== Local programming ==
The Iqaluit station produces most of CBC Radio's regional programs in Nunavut, including Qulliq on weekday morning, the noon-hour program Nipivut, Tausunni in the afternoon, and Saturday AM and Sunday AM on weekend mornings. Other afternoon Inuktitut programs Tuttavik and Tusaajaksat originate in Kuujjuaq, Quebec and Rankin Inlet, Nunavut, respectively. Some of the network's local programs air in English and Inuktitut, while others air in Inuktitut only.

The station also differs significantly from the main CBC Radio One schedule. Qulliq airs from 6:30 a.m. to 9:37 a.m. Eastern Time, and is followed by abbreviated broadcasts of The Current and Q. In the afternoons, programming in Inuktitut, including Tausunni and Tuttavik, airs in place of the national network programs.

In the evenings, the Inuktitut cultural magazines Ullumi Tusaqsauqaujut and Sinnaksautit originate at the Iqaluit station, airing at 10 and 10:30 p.m. Eastern Time respectively; the Radio One schedule follows at 11 p.m.

The station airs a more extensive schedule of local programming than most CBC Radio stations. It does not produce a Saturday afternoon regional arts magazine series for the territory. Instead, it airs The True North Concert Series, a CBC North program featuring live music recorded across the three northern territories. It also carries a weekly music request program for youth on Sunday afternoons at 3pm Eastern Time.

== Rebroadcasters ==
CFFB is broadcast on the following CBC owned and operated transmitters:

Rebroadcasters of CFFB
City of licence	Identifier	Frequency	Power	RECNet	CRTC Decision	Notes
Baker Lake	CBQR-FM-1	99.3 FM	89 watts	Query	2015-498	64°19′4.08″N 96°0′3.96″W
Cambridge Bay	CFFB-1-FM	101.9 FM	110 watts	Query	99-22	69°7′14.16″N 105°2′13.20″W; CBC North service from CHAK available on 105.1 FM
Iqaluit	CFFB-FM-3	91.1 FM	179 watts	Query	2011-773	63°44′21.12″N 68°33′20.88″W
Kugluktuk	CFFB-2-FM	101.9 FM	110 watts	Query		67°49′36.84″N 115°4′55.20″W; CBC North service from CHAK available on 105.1 FM
Kinngait	CBIH-FM	105.1 FM	76 watts	Query		64°13′53.04″N 76°31′59.88″W
Igloolik	CBII-FM	105.1 FM	76 watts	Query		69°23′2.04″N 81°47′58.92″W
Pangnirtung	CBIJ-FM	105.1 FM	82 watts	Query		66°8′31.92″N 65°42′51.84″W
Pond Inlet	CBIK-FM	105.1 FM	82 watts	Query		72°41′2.04″N 77°57′56.88″W
Resolute	CBIL-FM	105.1 FM	86 watts	Query		74°41′56.04″N 94°52′42.96″W
Arctic Bay	CKAB-FM	107.1 FM	15 watts	Query		73°2′21.84″N 85°8′40.92″W; Community-owned
Clyde River	CJCR-FM	107.1 FM	17 watts	Query		70°28′1.92″N 68°30′55.08″W; Owned by Arkunnirmiut Broadcasting Society
Kattiniq, Quebec	VF2402	93.5 FM	106 watts	Query	2002-70	61°41′15.00″N 73°40′54.12″W; Community-owned
Kugaaruk	CFPB-FM	107.1 FM	12 watts	Query	94-913	68°32′3.12″N 89°49′37.92″W; Community-owned
Whale Cove	CKWC-FM	106.1 FM	8 watts	Query		62°10′17.04″N 92°34′40.08″W; Community-owned

CFFB is also heard as a wrap-around feed for CKHV in Happy Valley-Goose Bay, Newfoundland and Labrador. CKHV also has a low-power (LP) FM rebroadcaster in Nain operating at 99.9 MHz with the call sign CKOK-FM. This in-turn is also fed to various low-power community stations along the Northern coast of Labrador.

On October 11, 2011, the CBC applied to add a new FM transmitter at Iqaluit. This application received Canadian Radio-television and Telecommunications Commission approval on December 14, 2011 and the new transmitter will operate at 91.1 MHz.

On June 29, 2012, the CBC applied to add more FM transmitters in Inukjuak, Kuujjuaq, Kuujjuarapik and Puvirnituq, Quebec. All of these will broadcast on 103.5 MHz with 50 watts. On October 30, 2012, the CBC received CRTC approval to add new FM transmitters in the above-mentioned communities. The commission also revokes the broadcasting licence for CKCX Sackville, New Brunswick effective November 1, 2012.

On September 20, 2019, the CBC received approval to revoke the "originating station" broadcast licence for CBQR-FM Rankin Inlet and its rebroadcasters. These stations now officially simulcast CFFB.

On June 19, 2025, the CBC submitted an application to the CRTC to revoke the broadcasting licence for its English-language AM radio CBC Radio One programming CFFB (1230 kHz) Iqaluit. Once converted, the originating station would remain at 91.1 MHz (channel 216A) and would increase the effective radiated power (ERP) from 179 watts to 640 watts, decrease the effective height of the antenna above average terrain (EHAAT) from -37.4 metres to -41.9 metres, and change the existing coordinates of the transmitter site. On February 27, 2026, The CRTC approved the application by the CBC to convert CFFB to the FM band.
