= CBNLT =

Canadian television station (1965–2012)

- Labrador City, Newfoundland and Labrador; Canada
- Channels: Analog: 13 (VHF)
- Branding: CBC Television

Programming
- Affiliations: CBC

Ownership
- Owner: Canadian Broadcasting Corporation

History
- First air date: August 22, 1965
- Last air date: July 31, 2012
- Former call signs: CJCL-TV (1965–1973)
- Call sign meaning: CBC Newfoundland Labrador City Television

Technical information
- ERP: 1.34 kW
- HAAT: 4.1 m (13 ft)
- Transmitter coordinates: 52°56′51″N 66°55′0″W
- Translator(s): CBNLT-1 9 Churchill Falls

CBNLT (channel 13) was a CBC Television station in Labrador City, Newfoundland and Labrador, Canada. It was an analog semi-satellite of CBNT-DT in St. John's. Until 1985, it produced limited amounts of local programming. The station was founded by the Iron Ore Company of Canada Aviation, Limited, and was co-owned with nearby sister station CFKL-TV in Schefferville, Quebec (which later became CBSET-1, which repeated CBMT Montreal).

== History ==
=== 1970s ===
On July 28, 1970, the licences for the two stations (CJCL-TV and CFKL-TV) were renewed for only two years. The Iron Ore Company of Canada Aviation, Limited was considered ineligible to hold a broadcast television station licence, as 60% of the company's shares were owned by American companies. Although both stations were private CBC affiliates, they aired the whole CBC schedule on videotape. At the time, both stations were bilingual (English and French), with 73% of their programming in English, and the other 27% in French. Since it was considered very unlikely another company would be willing to buy these stations, their licences were renewed temporarily under the existing ownership.

On March 30, 1973, the Canadian Broadcasting Corporation was given approval to purchase CJCL and CFKL. CJCL would continue to operate as it did when it was a private affiliate: on channel 13, with an effective radiated power of 214 watts (video), and 43 watts audio, using a directional antenna. Full CBC network programming would now be received via satellite transmissions, instead of having videotapes flown in. CJCL became CBNLT.

=== 1980s ===
In 1985, the Canadian Radio-television and Telecommunications Commission (CRTC) considered an application to amend CBNLT's licence so it could receive all of its programming directly from CBNT in St. John's. This would relieve CBNLT of its requirement to provide local programming (such as news segments) for Labrador City. In the application, the CBC told the CRTC that it would close CBNLT's local studio to save money, effective March 31, 1985. This meant the station would cease production of its local public affairs and information programming, which aired 15 minutes per day, Monday to Friday. This programming had aired for over 10 years, and was inserted in the provincial weekday evening news program Here and Now. This closure also resulted in the elimination of roughly 230 minutes per week of public service announcements.

The CBC had proposed that a news reporter supported by a technical crew would prepare news stories regarding Labrador City and Western Labrador, and send the tapes directly to CBNT in St. John's (the master control facilities), where the program editor would select which material would be broadcast.

The CRTC had expressed serious concerns the following year that the CBC had discontinued the production of 75 minutes of local live television programming in Labrador City, as of March 31, 1985, without prior notification to the community of Labrador City, or authorization from the CRTC. Due to budget cuts, it was agreed that it would be unreasonable to expect the CBC to completely reinstate the former level of local origination at CBNLT. The station was told, however, to continue to originate programming from Labrador City. The CRTC maintained that the programs broadcast by CBNLT and CBNLT-1 (its broadcast translator in Churchill Falls on Channel 9, at 0.0089 kW) be received from studios located at Labrador City.

In 1987, the CBC had notified the CRTC that it intended to introduce regular weekday local newscasts on CBNLT as of August 4.

On September 13, 1988, CBMRT (channel 9, 0.089 kW) in Fermont, Quebec, was authorized to change its program source from CBMT in Montreal to CBNLT in Labrador City.

=== 1990s ===
On February 22, 1991, CBNLT-1 in Churchill Falls was authorized to change its program source from CBNLT Labrador City, to the CBC Television network feed received via satellite. It would also air local programs produced by CBNT St. John's. The CBC indicated the change was necessary because the Quebec North Shore and Labrador Railway Company Inc. would abandon its microwave facilities on February 9. These facilities provided the feed to Churchill Falls.

Also on this date, CBNLT and CFLA-TV Goose Bay became rebroadcasting transmitters of CBNT.

=== Closure of CBNLT ===
Due to budget cuts handed down on the CBC in April 2012, the CBC announced several austerity measures to keep the corporation solvent and in operation; these included the closure of the CBC and Radio-Canada's remaining analog transmitters, including CBNLT and CBNLT-1, which occurred on July 31, 2012.

== See also ==
- List of CBC television stations
