= CBYT (TV) =

Canadian television station (1959–2012)

Corner Brook, Newfoundland and Labrador; Canada
- Channels: Analog: 5 (VHF)
- Branding: CBC Television

Programming
- Affiliations: CBC

Ownership
- Owner: Canadian Broadcasting Corporation
- Sister stations: CBY

History
- First air date: June 17, 1959
- Last air date: July 31, 2012
- Call sign meaning: CBC Y Television

Technical information
- ERP: 15.7 kW
- HAAT: 149.4 m (490 ft)
- Transmitter coordinates: 48°56′2″N 57°57′57″W
- Translator(s): see § Transmitters

CBYT (channel 5, cable channel 4) was a CBC Television station in Corner Brook, Newfoundland and Labrador, Canada.

== History ==
CBYT launched as a full-fledged station on June 17, 1959, rebroadcasting the signal from CBHT in Halifax, Nova Scotia, until CBNT in St. John's launched in 1964. It was once a semi-satellite of CBNT, carrying a partially separate newscast and producing some programs of its own. However, at its closure, the station was a full rebroadcaster of CBNT, even carrying CBNT's commercials.

In 2002, CBYT ceased to exist as a separately licensed station; its transmitter was assigned to the licence of CBNT.

Due to budget cuts handed down on the CBC in April 2012, the CBC announced several austerity measures to keep the corporation solvent and in operation; this included the closure of the CBC and Radio-Canada's remaining analog transmitters, including CBYT and its transmitters, on July 31, 2012.

== Transmitters ==
Station	City of licence	Channel	ERP	HAAT	Transmitter coordinates
CBYT-1	Stephenville	8 (VHF)	48.23 kW	365.3 m	48°35′23″N 58°39′40″W
CBYT-2	Irishtown	7 (VHF)	0.008 kW	NA	48°59′0″N 57°55′56″W
CBYT-3	Bonne Bay	2 (VHF)	5.152 kW	33.4 m	49°33′12″N 57°53′20″W
CBYT-4	Port aux Basques	3 (VHF)	0.84 kW	57 m	47°34′49″N 59°8′42″W
CBYT-5	St. Andrew's	6 (VHF)	1 kW	35 m	47°48′12″N 59°17′20″W
CBYT-6	Cow Head	8 (VHF)	11.85 kW	62.8 m	49°55′11″N 57°48′54″W
CBYT-7	Trout River	13 (VHF)	0.009 kW	NA	49°28′40″N 58°7′58″W
CBYT-8	Portland Creek	13 (VHF)	10.332 kW	115.2 m	50°8′41″N 57°37′28″W
CBYT-9	Hawke's Bay	4 (VHF)	4.8 kW	65.6 m	50°38′58″N 57°17′47″W
CBYT-10	Harbour le Cou	5 (VHF)	0.001 kW	NA	47°37′20″N 58°41′4″W
CBYT-11	Rose Blanche	9 (VHF)	0.284 kW	-7.3 m	47°36′58″N 58°41′26″W
CBYT-12	Gillams	13 (VHF)	0.009 kW	NA	49°0′32″N 58°8′6″W
CBYT-13	Lark Harbour	3 (VHF)	0.009 kW	NA	49°6′12″N 58°22′52″W
CBYT-14	York Harbour	12 (VHF)	0.001 kW	NA	49°3′30″N 58°19′34″W
CBYAT	Deer Lake	12 (VHF)	1.84 kW	87.5 m	49°14′22″N 57°28′26″W
