= CFWH-TV =

Canadian television station (1968–2012)

- Whitehorse, Yukon; Canada
- Channels: Analog: 6 (VHF)
- Branding: CBC Television

Programming
- Affiliations: CBC

Ownership
- Owner: Canadian Broadcasting Corporation

History
- First air date: November 26, 1968
- Last air date: July 31, 2012
- Call sign meaning: "Canadian Forces Whitehorse" (derived from related radio station CFWH)

Technical information
- ERP: 0.798 kW
- HAAT: 420.5 m (1,380 ft)
- Transmitter coordinates: 60°39′34″N 134°53′4″W
- Translator(s): see § Transmitters

CFWH-TV (channel 6) was a CBC Television station in Whitehorse, Yukon, Canada. Commencing transmissions on November 26, 1968, it was one of ultimately six Frontier Coverage Package stations in the Yukon; satellite delivery of colour television began on February 5, 1973. It was a part of the CBC North television system.

Prior to the launch of CFWH-TV and for several years thereafter, Whitehorse's WHTV cable TV system (now part of Northwestel Cable) carried a mix of prerecorded CBC, CTV and syndicated programs on channel 4 on its system, offered up to two weeks after their initial broadcasts on stations in southern Canada.

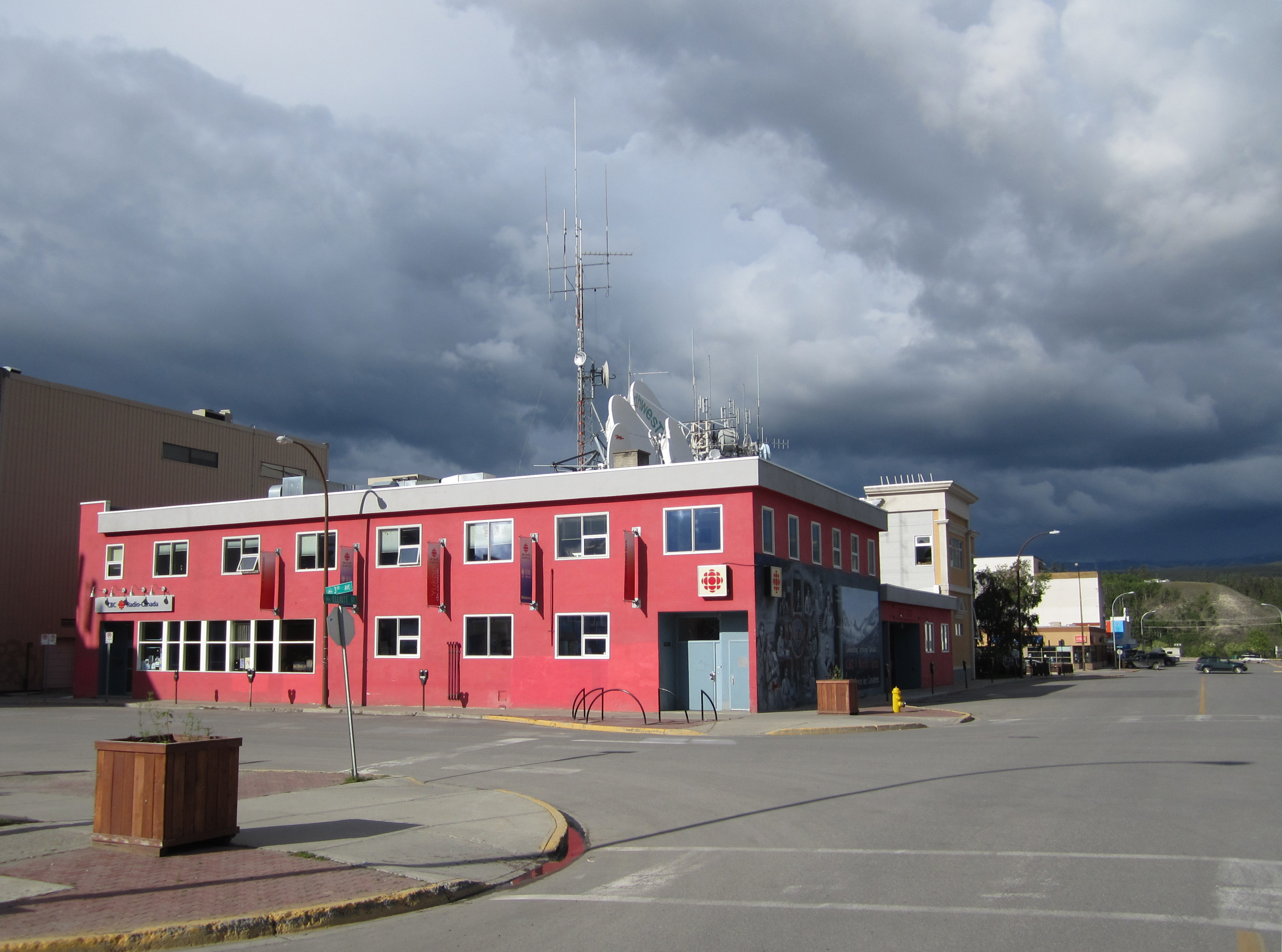
Building in Whitehorse

== History ==
During its life, CFWH-TV was always licensed as a repeater. For most of its existence, this station was part of a "radiocommunication distribution undertaking" that included CFYK-TV in Yellowknife and CFFB-TV in Iqaluit. The Canadian Radio-television and Telecommunications Commission (CRTC) did not license it as a television station, but merely as a transmitter to redistribute CBC North. In 2011, CFYK-TV was licensed as a full television station, with CFWH and CFFB as repeaters.

CFWH-TV was licensed as a rebroadcaster of CFYK-TV, even though it operated as a semi-satellite with its own network of rebroadcasters. As a result, CFWH-TV and its network of rebroadcasters was one of many CBC and Radio-Canada's remaining analogue transmitters closed on July 31, 2012, as part of several austerity measures announced in April 2012 to keep the corporation solvent and in operation. As a result, this leaves almost the entirety of the Yukon without any aerial CBC television service, the only exception being a community owned broadcaster in Upper Liard, CH2986 channel 9. However, few viewers in the Yukon actually lost access to CBC programming due to the extremely high penetration of cable and satellite, which have long been musts for acceptable television in this remote area.

CFYK still operates a Yukon bureau at the CBC's studio in Whitehorse.

== Transmitters ==
CFWH-TV had five over the air VHF analog rebroadcasters throughout the territory of Yukon before they were decommissioned on July 31, 2012.

| City of license | Callsign | Channel | ERP | Notes |
|---|---|---|---|---|
| Clinton Creek | CBDCT | 8 | 5 watts | Began operation as CBTE-TV-2 on July 28, 1969; defunct as of 1980 |
| Dawson City | CBDDT | 7 | 5 w | Began operation as CBTE-TV-3 on August 8, 1964 as a CBUT transmitter; became a CFWH transmitter by 1974 |
| Elsa | CBKHT-1 | 9 | 5 w | Began operation as CBTE-TV-5 on November 27, 1969 |
| Faro | CBDBT | 8 | 5 w | Began operation as CBTE-TV-6 on August 9, 1971 |
| Keno Hill | CBKHT | 13 | 10 w | Began broadcasting on November 27, 1973 |
| Mayo | CBKHT-2 | 7 | 5 w | |
| Watson Lake | CBDAT | 8 | 35 w | Began operation as CBTE-TV-1 on February 19, 1969 |

== See also ==
- CBC North
