= CHAK-TV =

Television station in Inuvik (1969–2012)

Inuvik, Northwest Territories; Canada
- Channels: Analog: 6 (VHF)
- Branding: CBC Television

Programming
- Affiliations: CBC

Ownership
- Owner: Canadian Broadcasting Corporation
- Sister stations: CHAK

History
- First air date: August 22, 1969
- Last air date: July 31, 2012; (42 years, 344 days)
- Call sign meaning: CH Aklavik

Technical information
- ERP: 0.236 kW
- HAAT: 135 m (443 ft)
- Transmitter coordinates: 68°21′46″N 133°41′53″W

CHAK-TV (channel 6) was a CBC Television station in Inuvik, Northwest Territories, Canada. The station was registered on May 16, 1968, to the Canadian Broadcasting Corporation to operate on channel 6, with an effective radiated power of 3,000 watts video and 300 watts audio. The antenna height (EHAAT) would be 394 feet. This station was part of the CBC's Frontier Coverage Package for northern communications.

CHAK-TV was also heard at 87.7 MHz on FM radios, though at a slightly lower volume than other FM stations - due to technical reasons.

== History ==
The station began broadcasting on August 22, 1969, and was associated with CHAK radio. In 1974, the station placed a broadcast translator in Fort McPherson (CHAK-TV-1) on channel 13, with an effective radiated power of 100 watts.

In 1985, some changes took place at CHAK-TV. July 3 saw a proposal to decrease power from 3,000 watts to 122 watts. During this time, the CRTC noted that CHAK-TV was originally licensed to serve both Inuvik, and nearby Aklavik, and to serve the town of Fort McPherson, via CHAK-TV-1. Since CHAK-TV-1 was being fed by satellite by this time, the CBC filed an application to place a new satellite-fed low-power transmitter at Aklavik (which would become CBEX-TV). This was approved by the CRTC on December 18. The CRTC saw that a reduction in power would not affect the station's coverage area in Inuvik, and noted that no changes would take effect until CBEX-TV was on the air. This was to ensure that Aklavik and area would not be deprived of CBC services.

On February 10, 1986, CBEX-TV in Aklavik took to the air on Channel 13, with an effective radiated power of 100 watts.

Due to budget cuts handed down on the CBC in April 2012, the CBC has announced several austerity measures to keep the corporation solvent and in operation; this included the closure of the CBC and Radio-Canada's remaining analog transmitters, including CHAK-TV and its rebroadcasters on July 31, 2012.

== Transmitters ==
CHAK had 3 analog television rebroadcasters located in Fort McPherson, Tuktoyaktuk and Aklavik. None of CBC or Radio-Canada's television rebroadcasters were converted to digital.

City of license	Callsign	Channel
Aklavik	CBEX-TV	13 (VHF)
Fort McPherson	CHAK-TV-1	13 (VHF)
Tuktoyaktuk	CBEPT	8 (VHF)

== See also ==
- CBC North
