= CFLA-TV =

Television station in Happy Valley-Goose Bay (1957–2012)

- Happy Valley-Goose Bay, Newfoundland and Labrador; Canada
- Channels: Analog: 8 (VHF)
- Branding: CBC Television

Programming
- Affiliations: CBC

Ownership
- Owner: Canadian Broadcasting Corporation

History
- First air date: 1957
- Last air date: July 31, 2012
- Former affiliations: AFRTS (secondary, 1957-1973)
- Call sign meaning: CF LAbrador

Technical information
- ERP: 9.63 kW
- HAAT: 206.1 m
- Transmitter coordinates: 53°17′57″N 60°32′12″W

CFLA-TV was the local CBC Television station in Happy Valley-Goose Bay, Newfoundland and Labrador, Canada. Although it started as a standalone station, by the time of its closure it was an analog rebroadcaster of CBNT, the CBC station in St. John's.

== History ==
=== 1950s to 1970s ===
The station was founded by the US Air Force in 1957 via a Canada-United States agreement. The station's licence was held by the CBC (making it a CBC owned and operated television station), but it was maintained and operated by the USAF. The station was broadcast on VHF Channel 8 with an effective radiated power of 348 watts video and 174 watts audio.

==== Operations ====
The studio was located in the basement of building S565. The transmitter, two studio cameras and switcher were Dage products. Telecine consisted of two 16mm RCA projectors and a 35mm slide projector. No videotape.

Leo Harvey was the CBC Mgt. Rep. and Capt. William James, base information officer, was the military supervisor.

The equipment for CFLA originally was located at Loring Air Force Base, Maine during 1954-56 due to the lack of commercial service in that area. The station was relocated to CFB Goose Bay once Presque Isle's WAGM began broadcasting on channel 8 in 1956.

=== 1970s to 2012 ===
In 1973, the USAF formally transferred operations to the CBC.

On March 1, 1988, the station's licence was renewed. The CRTC also noted that CFLA was basically a rebroadcast transmitter of CBNT St. John's, aside from 3 hours and 20 minutes of locally produced programming each week. Most of this programming was a ten-minute insert of the daily news and public affairs program Here and Now (from CBNT), and a 30-minute news and general interest program Coffee Break, which aired on weekday mornings.

Starting October 8, 1991, CFLA was given approval to decrease its ERP from 6,800 to 1,930 watts. With this change, a new antenna system was installed, and the station became a full-time rebroadcaster of CBNT.

Due to budget cuts handed down on the CBC in April 2012, the CBC has announced several austerity measures to keep the corporation solvent and in operation; this included the closure of the CBC and Radio-Canada's remaining analog transmitters, including CFLA, on July 31, 2012.
