= CFFB-TV =

Television station in Iqaluit (1972–2012)

Iqaluit, Nunavut; Canada
- Channels: Analog: 8 (VHF)
- Branding: CBC North

Programming
- Affiliations: CBC

Ownership
- Owner: Canadian Broadcasting Corporation

History
- First air date: February 1, 1972
- Last air date: July 31, 2012; (40 years, 181 days)
- Call sign meaning: Canada's Finest Frobisher Bay (former name of Iqaluit)

Technical information
- ERP: 0.01 kW
- HAAT: NA
- Transmitter coordinates: 63°44′21″N 68°33′21″W

CFFB-TV (channel 8) was a CBC Television transmitter in Iqaluit, Nunavut, Canada. It repeated the CBC North service, which consisted of the regular national CBC Television schedule in Mountain Time, with the addition of the northern news programs CBC Igalaaq in Inuktitut at 6 p.m. and 7:30 p.m. (Eastern Time) and CBC Northbeat in English at 8 p.m. (Eastern Time).

No television programs originated at CFFB-TV.

== History ==
During its life, CFFB-TV was always licensed as a repeater; in its last year before its closedown, it was licensed by the CRTC as a repeater of CFYK-TV in Yellowknife. As a result, CFFB and its network of rebroadcasters was one of many CBC and Radio-Canada's remaining analogue transmitters closed on July 31, 2012, as part of several austerity measures announced in April 2012 to keep the corporation solvent and in operation. As a result, this leaves almost the entirety of Nunavut without any terrestrial CBC television service, with only community-owned rebroadcasters of CFYK remaining in Arctic Bay, Clyde River, and Whale Cove, along with one carrying Radio-Canada's Montreal station CBFT-DT in Iqaluit. However, CFYK maintains a bureau at CFFB's former studios that produces Nunavut-focused stories for Igalaaq and Northbeat. Additionally, few viewers in Nunavut actually lost access to CBC programming due to the extremely high penetration of cable and satellite, a must for acceptable television in this remote area.

== Transmitters ==
Other communities in Nunavut received the same service, delivered to transmitters in the communities by satellite from the main CBC network.

CFFB-TV had 12 analog television re-transmitters throughout the territory of Nunavut.

None of CBC or Radio-Canada's television re-transmitters were converted to digital.

| City of license | Callsign | Channel |
|---|---|---|
| Arviat | CBEHT | 9 (VHF) |
| Baker Lake | CBEIT | 9 (VHF) |
| Cambridge Bay | CBENT | 9 (VHF) |
| Cape Dorset | CBEJT | 9 (VHF) |
| Gjoa Haven | CBERT | 9 (VHF) |
| Igloolik | CBII-TV | 9 (VHF) |
| Kugluktuk | CBEOT | 9 (VHF) |
| Pangnirtung | CBEKT | 9 (VHF) |
| Pond Inlet | CBELT | 9 (VHF) |
| Rankin Inlet | CBECT | 9 (VHF) |
| Resolute Bay | CBEMT | 9 (VHF) |
| Taloyoak | CBEQT | 9 (VHF) |

== See also ==
- CBC North
