= List of assets owned by Rogers Communications =

This is a list of assets currently owned by Rogers Communications Inc.

== Telecommunications ==
=== Rogers Cable Division ===
- Rogers Cable — both a cable television and internet service provider with about 2.25 million television customers, and over 930,000 internet subscribers, primarily in Southern & Eastern Ontario, New Brunswick (except in Sackville), and Newfoundland and Labrador.
  - Rogers TV — English-language network of community-oriented channels.
  - TV Rogers — French-language network of community-oriented channels.
- Source Cable — cable service in Hamilton, Ontario
- Sportsnet PPV — Pay-per-view service
- CPAC (66.75%) — specialty channel

=== Rogers Internet Division ===
- Rogers Hi-Speed Internet
- Rogers Telecom
  - Rogers Home Phone Service

=== Rogers Wireless Division ===
- Rogers Wireless
  - Rogers Hotspots (Rogers Open) — WiFi hotspot service installed in venues across Canada
- Fido Solutions
- Chatr

== Rogers Sports & Media ==
=== Conventional television ===
- Citytv
  - CITY - Toronto, Ontario (First aired 1972)
  - CKVU - Vancouver, British Columbia (O&O since 2002)
  - CKAL - Calgary, Alberta (O&O since 2005)
  - CKEM - Edmonton, Alberta (O&O since 2005)
  - CHMI - Winnipeg, Manitoba (O&O since 2005)
  - Citytv Saskatchewan - Regina & Saskatoon, Saskatchewan (O&O since 2012)
  - CJNT - Montreal, Quebec (O&O since 2012)
- OMNI Television
  - CFMT - Toronto, Ontario (First aired 1979)
  - CJMT - Toronto, Ontario (O&O since 2002)
  - CHNM - Vancouver, British Columbia (O&O since 2008)
  - CJCO - Calgary, Alberta (O&O since 2008)
  - CJEO - Edmonton, Alberta (O&O since 2008)

=== Specialty and Pay TV ===
Entertainment

- Licensed by The Walt Disney Company
  - FX (66.64%)
  - FXX (66.64%)

Lifestyle

- Licensed by NBCUniversal
  - Bravo
- Licensed by Skydance Corporation
  - Discovery Channel
  - Food Network
  - HGTV
  - Investigation Discovery
  - Magnolia Network
- TSC

News

- CityNews 24/7

Sports

- Sportsnet
  - Sportsnet 360
  - Sportsnet One
  - Sportsnet World

=== Television production ===
- Dome Productions (50%)

=== Groupe TVA ===
Rogers Communications owns 0.03% stake of Groupe TVA

- TVA
  - CFTM-DT - Montreal
  - CFCM-DT - Quebec City
  - CFER-DT - Rimouski
  - CHLT-DT - Sherbrooke
  - CHEM-DT - Trois-Rivières
  - CJPM-DT - Saguenay
- Addik — film and television series
- Canal Indigo — PPV movie service
- Le Canal Nouvelles — 24 hour news
- CASA — lifestyle and real estate
- Évasion — travel and adventure
- Prise 2 — retro film and television series
- QUB - public affairs and social issues, TV simulcast of Qub Radio
- Témoin — crime dramas and true crime
- TVA Sports — sports
- Zeste — food-related entertainment and lifestyle programming

=== Radio ===
City	Call Sign	Frequency	Branding	Format
Abbotsford	CKQC-FM	FM 107.1	107.1 Country	Country
Abbotsford	CKKS-FM-1	FM 92.5	KiSS Throwbacks	Classic Hits
Banff	CHFM-FM-1	FM 99.3	Star 95.9	Adult Contemporary
Banff	CJAQ-FM-1	FM 94.1	Jack 96.9	Adult Hits
Banff	CHMN-FM-1	FM 106.5	106.5 Mountain FM	Adult Contemporary
Calgary	CFAC	AM 960	Sportsnet 960 The Fan	Sports
Calgary	CFFR	AM 660	660 NewsRadio Calgary	News
Calgary	CHFM-FM	FM 95.9	Star 95.9	Adult Contemporary
Calgary	CJAQ-FM	FM96.9	Jack 96.9	Adult Hits
Canmore	CHMN-FM	FM106.5	106.5 Mountain FM	Adult Contemporary
Chilliwack	CKKS-FM	FM 107.5	KiSS Throwbacks	Classic Hits
Chilliwack	CKSR-FM	FM 98.3	Star 98.3	Adult Contemporary
Dartmouth	CFDR-FM	FM 92.9	Jack 92.9	Adult Hits
Edmonton	CHBN-FM	FM 91.7	KiSS 91.7	Contemporary Hits
Edmonton	CHDI-FM	FM 102.9	SONiC 102.9	Alternative Rock
Egmont	CIEG-FM	FM 107.5	107.5 Mountain FM	Adult Contemporary
Fort McMurray	CKYX-FM	FM 97.9	97.9 Rock	Rock
Fort McMurray	CJOK-FM	FM 93.3	93.3 Country	Country
Gibsons	CISC-FM	FM 107.5	107.5 Mountain FM	Adult Contemporary
Grande Prairie	CFGP-FM	FM 97.7	97.7 Rock	Rock
Halifax	CJNI-FM	FM 95.7	95.7 NewsRadio Halifax	News
Invermere	CJAQ-FM-2	FM 98.3	Jack 96.9	Adult Hits
Kingston	CIKR-FM	FM 105.7	K Rock 105.7	Rock
Kingston	CKXC-FM	FM 93.5	93.5 Country	Country
Kitchener	CHYM-FM	FM 96.7	CHYM 96.7	Adult Contemporary
Kitchener	CIKZ-FM	FM 106.7	106.7 Country	Country
Kitchener	CKGL	AM 570	570 NewsRadio Kitchener	News
Lethbridge	CFRV-FM	FM 107.7	KiSS 107.7	Contemporary Hits
Lethbridge	CJRX-FM	FM 106.7	106.7 Rock	Rock
London	CHST-FM	FM 102.3	Jack 102.3	Adult Hits
Medicine Hat	CKMH-FM	FM 105.3	105.3 Rock	Rock
Medicine Hat	CJCY-FM	FM 102.1	Jack 102.1	Adult Hits
North Bay	CHUR-FM	FM 100.5	KiSS 100.5	Contemporary Hits
North Bay	CKAT	AM 600	600 Country	Country
North Bay	CKFX-FM	FM 101.9	101.9 The Fox	Rock
Ottawa	CHEZ-FM	FM 106	CHEZ 106	Rock
Ottawa	CISS-FM	FM 105.3	KiSS 105.3	Contemporary Hits
Pemberton	CISP-FM	FM 104.5	104.5 Mountain FM	Adult Contemporary
Pender Harbour	CIPN-FM	FM 104.7	104.7 Mountain FM	Adult Contemporary
Sault Ste. Marie	CHAS-FM	FM 100.5	KiSS 100.5	Contemporary Hits
Sault Ste. Marie	CJQM-FM	FM 104.3	104.3 Country	Country
Sechelt	CFUN-FM	FM 104.7	104.7 Mountain FM	Adult Contemporary
Smiths Falls	CKBY-FM	FM 101.1	101.1 Country	Country
Squamish	CISQ-FM	FM 107.1	107.1 Mountain FM	Adult Contemporary
Sudbury	CJRQ-FM	FM 92.7	Q92	Rock
Sudbury	CJMX-FM	FM 105.3	KiSS 105.3	Contemporary Hits
Timmins	CJQQ-FM	FM 92.1	Q92	Rock
Timmins	CKGB-FM	FM 99.3	KiSS 99.3	Contemporary Hits
Toronto	CFTR	AM 680	680 NewsRadio Toronto	News
Toronto	CHFI-FM	FM 98.1 HD1	98.1 CHFI	Adult Contemporary
Toronto	CKIS-FM	FM 92.5	KiSS 92.5	Contemporary Hits
Toronto	CJCL	AM 590	Sportsnet 590 The Fan	Sports
Toronto	ROKT	FM 98.1 HD2	The Rocket	Mainstream Rock
Vancouver	CISL	AM 650	Sportsnet 650 Vancouver	Sports
Vancouver	CJAX-FM	FM 96.9	Jack 96.9	Adult Hits
Vancouver	CKWX	AM 1130	1130 NewsRadio Vancouver	News
Vancouver	CKKS-FM-2	FM 104.9	KiSS Throwbacks	Classic Hits
Victoria	CHTT-FM	FM 103.1	Jack 103.1	Adult Hits
Victoria	CIOC-FM	FM 98.5	Ocean 98.5	Adult Contemporary
Whistler	CISW-FM	FM 102.1	102.1 Mountain FM	Adult Contemporary
Winnipeg	CITI-FM	FM 92.1	92.1 CITI	Rock
Winnipeg	CKY-FM	FM 102.3	KiSS 102.3	Contemporary Hits

=== Podcasts ===
- Frequency Podcast Network
- Pacific Content

== Other Assets ==
- Rogers Bank
- Rogers Smart Home Monitoring

=== Sports Teams ===
- Maple Leaf Sports & Entertainment
  - Toronto Maple Leafs
  - Toronto Raptors
  - Toronto FC
  - Toronto Argonauts
  - Toronto Marlies
  - Raptors 905
  - Toronto FC II
  - TFC Academy
- Toronto Blue Jays

=== Stadiums ===
- Rogers Centre
- Rogers Arena

== Former Assets ==
- Hockey Night in Canada – Rogers-produced part-time television network airing on CBC Television stations
- Ignite SmartStream — a streaming platform from Rogers.
- Inukshuk Wireless (50%)
- Mobilicity — brand retired in 2016, customers moved to Chatr.
- Rogers Publishing — sold to St. Joseph Communications in 2019.
  - L'actualité médicale
  - L'actualité pharmaceutique
  - Canadian Business
  - Châtelaine
  - Chatelaine
  - The Directory of Restaurant & Fast Food Chains
  - The Directory of Retail Chains
  - Emballages, Les Nouvelles
  - Enfants Quebec
  - Flare
  - Gestion Santé
  - glow
  - glow health
  - Hello! Canada
  - LOU LOU (English)
  - LOU LOU (French)
  - Maclean's
  - Mère Nouvelle
  - Mon Enfant
  - MoneySense
  - The National List of Advertisers
  - Profit
  - Pure
  - Québec Pharmacie
  - Shopping Centre News’s
  - Today's Parent
- Rogers Video — video rental business (although some stores converted into Rogers Plus outlets)
- Shomi — video streaming service co-owned with Shaw Communications, shut down in 2016.
- Yoopa — children's programming
- YTV - co-owned with CUC Broadcasting/Shaw from 1988 to 1996

== See also ==
- List of who owns what
