= Kiss FM =

Kiss FM, Kiss Radio or variants may refer to:

== Asia-Oceania ==
=== Australia ===
- KIIS Network, a contemporary hit radio network
  - KIIS 101.1 Melbourne, Victoria
  - KIIS 106.5 Sydney, New South Wales
- Kiss FM Australia
  - Kiss 90 FM, an earlier aspirant community radio station
- Kiss FM (now Move FM) Lithgow, New South Wales

=== Other places in Asia-Oceania ===
- DWKI, Lucena, Quezon, Philippines, branded as 95.1 Kiss FM
- DYRD-FM, Tagbilaran, Bohol, Philippines, branded as 102.3 Kiss FM
- Kiss92 FM, Singapore
- Kiss FM (Sri Lanka)
- Kiss Radio Taiwan, the radio station playing Chinese music and some English top 40 songs
- Kiss-FM KOBE, Japan

== Europe ==
- 98.8 KISS FM Berlin, Germany
- Kiss (UK radio station), previously known as "Kiss 100" and "Kiss FM"
- Kiss 101, previously known as "Vibe 101", based in South Wales and Severn Estuary area, including Bristol
- Kiss 102, operated by Faze FM, based in Manchester - now part of the Capital brand
- Kiss 105, operated by Faze FM, based in Yorkshire - now part of the Capital brand
- Kiss 105-108, previously known as "Vibe 105-108", based in the East of England
- Kiss FM (Bosnia and Herzegovina), a Bosnian commercial station broadcasting from Kiseljak
- Kiss FM Chisinau, better known as "100.9FM", Moldovan branch of Kiss FM Romania
- Kiss FM (Finland), owned by SBS Broadcasting Group and now defunct
- Kiss FM (Portugal), radio station based in Algarve
- Kiss FM (Romania), a syndicated national Romanian radio network with headquarters in Bucharest
- Kiss FM (Spain); see List of radio stations in Spain
- Kiss FM (Ukraine); see List of radio stations in Ukraine
- Kiss FM (the Netherlands), based in Almere

== North America ==
=== Canada ===
- KISS-FM (brand), used in Canada by stations owned by Rogers Media
  - CHUR-FM, branded as "KiSS 100.5", in North Bay, Ontario
  - CISS-FM, branded as "KiSS 105.3", in Ottawa, Ontario
  - CHAS-FM, branded as "KiSS 100.5", in Sault Ste. Marie, Ontario
  - CJMX-FM, branded as "KiSS 105.3", in Sudbury, Ontario
  - CKGB-FM, branded as "KiSS 99.3", in Timmins, Ontario
  - CKIS-FM, branded as "KiSS 92.5", in Toronto, Ontario
  - CHFM-FM, formerly known as "KiSS 95.9", in Calgary, Alberta
  - CFRV-FM, branded as "KiSS 107.7", in Lethbridge, Alberta
  - CKY-FM, branded as "KiSS 102.3", in Winnipeg, Manitoba
  - CKKS-FM, formerly branded as "KiSS RADiO", in Chilliwack, British Columbia
  - CHTT-FM, formerly branded as "KiSS 103.1", in Victoria, British Columbia
  - CHBN-FM, branded as "KiSS 91.7", in Edmonton, Alberta
- CHMX-FM, formerly known as "Kiss 92 FM", in Regina, Saskatchewan (owned by Harvard Broadcasting)
- CKIZ-FM, formerly known as "107.5 Kiss FM", in Vernon, British Columbia (owned by Jim Pattison Group)

=== United States ===
- KISS-FM (brand), a brand name used by Top 40 stations, several of which owned by iHeartMedia
  - KHFI-FM, better known as "96.7 KISS-FM", in Austin, Texas
  - KHKS-FM, better known as "106.1 KISS-FM", in Dallas, Texas
  - KIIS-FM, also known as "102.7 KIIS-FM", Top 40 station (owned by iHeartMedia as its flagship "KISS-FM" brand)
  - KKDM, also known as "Kiss 1075", in Des Moines, Iowa
  - KSME, better known as "96.1 Kiss FM" in Greeley, Colorado
  - KUUL, also known as "101.3 KISS FM" in East Moline, Illinois
  - KWNW, branded as "101.9 Kiss FM"; licensed in Crawfordsville, Arkansas, and broadcasting in Memphis, Tennessee
  - KZZP, better known as "104.7 Kiss-FM", in Phoenix, Arizona
  - WAEV-FM, better known as "97.3 KISSFM", in Savannah, Georgia
  - WAKS, also known as "96.5 KISS-FM", in Cleveland, Ohio
  - WFKS, also known as "Kiss 95.1", in Melbourne, Florida
  - WKFS, also known as "Kiss 107", in Cincinnati, Ohio
  - WKSC-FM, also known as "103.5 KISS FM", in Chicago, Illinois
  - WKSS, also known as "Kiss 95.7", in Hartford, Connecticut
  - WKST-FM, also known as "96.1 Kiss", in Pittsburgh, Pennsylvania
  - WPIA, better known as "98.5 Kiss FM", in Peoria, Illinois (owned by Independence Media; uses the KISS FM logo under license from iHeartMedia)
  - WVKS, also known as "92.5 KISS-FM", in Toledo, Ohio
  - WXKS-FM, better known as "Kiss 108", in Boston - America's original KISS
- KCRS-FM "103-3 Kiss FM" in Midland/Odessa, Texas (owned by ICA)
- KISS-FM, "Kiss Rocks 99.5 FM", in San Antonio, Texas (owned by Cox Radio)
- KKSS "Kiss 97.3" in Santa Fe, New Mexico (owned by American General Media)
- KTRS-FM, better as "104.7 Kiss FM", in Casper, Wyoming (owned by Townsquare Media)
- KXSS-FM "96.9 Kiss-FM" in Amarillo, Texas (owned by Townsquare Media)
- KZII "102.5 Kiss-FM" in Lubbock, Texas (owned by Townsquare Media)
- WDMK, better known as "105.9 Kiss FM" in Detroit, Michigan (owned by Radio One)
- WKSE, "Kiss 98.5", in Buffalo, New York (owned by Audacy)
- WKSF, "99.9 Kiss Country" in Asheville, North Carolina (owned by iHeart)
- WMKS, formerly known as "100.3 Kiss FM" in High Point, North Carolina (owned by iHeartRadio)
- WNKS, "Kiss 95.1", in Charlotte, North Carolina, now WNLV
- WRKS (now WEPN), better known as "98.7 Kiss FM", former legendary soul and R&B station in New York City (owned by Emmis Communications)
- WSKU, better known as "105.5 Kiss-FM", in Utica, New York (owned by Roser Communications Network)
- WXSS, better known as "103.7 Kiss FM", in Milwaukee, Wisconsin (owned by Audacy)
- WLYK, known as "Kiss 102.7", in Cape Vincent, New York, targeting Kingston, Canada (owned by Rogers Media)
- KKST, known as "Kiss 98.7", in Alexandria, Louisiana (owned by Cenla Broadcasting)

=== Other places in North America ===
- 106.1 Kiss FM, George Town, Cayman Islands
- XEX-FM, formerly Kiss FM (1994), Mexico City, Mexico

== South America ==
- Kiss FM (Brazil), São Paulo-based rock radio
