= Media in North Bay, Ontario =

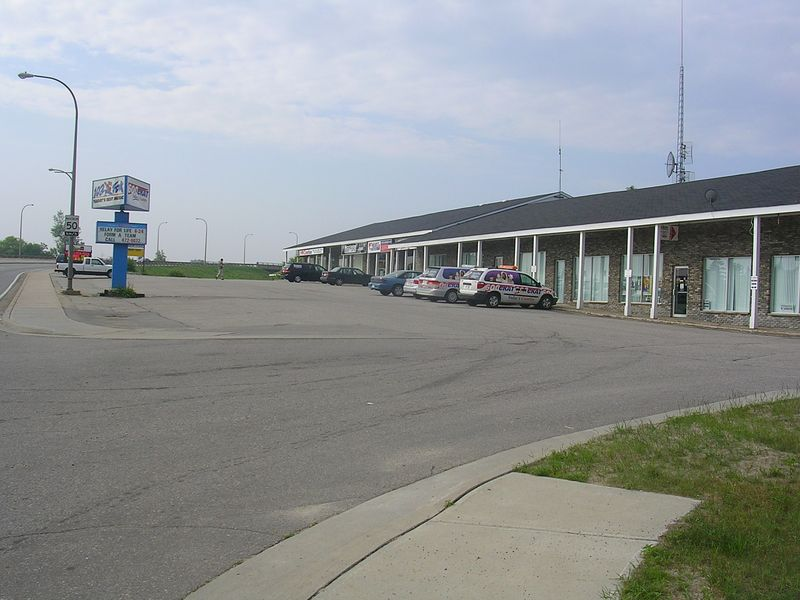
Three of North Bay's radio stations find their homes here: EZRock, The Fox and CKAT from circa. 2005

This is a list of media in North Bay, Ontario.

== Radio ==
Frequency	Call sign	Branding	Format	Owner	Notes
600 AM	CKAT	Country 600	country/news/sports	Rogers Radio	
90.5 FM	CFCH-FM	Country 90.5	country	Vista Radio	Launched June 15, 2021
95.1 FM	CBON-FM-17	Ici Radio-Canada Première	public news/talk	Canadian Broadcasting Corporation	French, rebroadcasts CBON-FM Sudbury
96.1 FM	CBCN-FM	CBC Radio One	public news/talk	Canadian Broadcasting Corporation	rebroadcasts CBCS-FM Sudbury
97.1 FM	CHYQ-FM	Le Loup FM	Hot adult contemporary	Le5 Communications	French; licensed to Sturgeon Falls
99.3 FM	CFSF-FM	Moose FM	adult contemporary	Vista Radio	licensed to Sturgeon Falls
100.5 FM	CHUR-FM	Kiss 100.5	hot adult contemporary	Rogers Radio	
101.9 FM	CKFX-FM	101.9 The Fox	active rock	Rogers Radio	
103.5 FM	CJTK-FM	KFM	Christian music	Harvest Ministries Sudbury	rebroadcasts CJTK-FM Sudbury with some local content
106.3 FM	CFXN-FM	Jet FM	classic hits	Vista Radio	

Canadore College operates a cable/internet only radio station, "Panther Radio" with the call sign CRFM.

=== Weatheradio ===
Frequency	Call Sign	Branding	Format	Owner	Notes
162.475 MHz	XLJ 893	Weatheradio Canada	Weather Alerts	Meteorological Service of Canada	

=== Defunct Radio Stations ===
Frequency	Call Sign	Notes
89.5 FM	CJTK-FM-1	Former repeater of CJTK-FM Sudbury Currently located at 103.5 FM with some local programming from a studio in North Bay
92.5 FM	CHIM-FM	Former rebroadcaster of CHIM-FM Timmins
93.5 FM	CFDN-FM	A local non-profit group previously held short-term licenses to broadcast special events programming in both North Bay and Sturgeon Falls on 93.5 FM with the call sign CFDN, but never launched a permanent station.
104.9 FM	CKTR-FM	Defunct tourist information & community radio station

== TV ==
North Bay is home to one television station which is locally licensed, CKNY-TV. However, that station effectively acts as a satellite of Sudbury's CICI-TV as part of the CTV Northern Ontario system — the station's only direct local production is a brief local news insert which airs as part of regional newscasts produced at the Sudbury station.

The city formerly also had its own CBC Television affiliate, CHNB-TV. However, that station was acquired directly by the CBC in 2002, and became a straight analogue rebroadcaster of CBLT-DT from Toronto; the repeater would close down on July 31, 2012, due to budget cuts.

The North Bay area is not designated as a mandatory market for digital television conversion, so the majority of stations broadcast in analogue.

In 2020, Industry Canada approved applications to convert CKNY-TV and CHCH-TV-6 signals to a digital format. Just after midnight on October 30, 2020, CTV North Bay channel 10 changed its signal frequency from analogue to digital. CHCH's transmission was temporarily off-the-air due to technical difficulties in December 2020, but resumed service to the North Bay community June 9, 2022. The signal remains in analogue.

OTA channel	OTA virtual channel (PSIP)	Cogeco Cable	Call sign	Network	Notes
12 (VHF)	10.1	9	CKNY-DT	CTV	De facto rebroadcaster of CICI-TV (Sudbury)
15 (UHF)	2.1	3	CFGC-DT-2	Global	Rebroadcaster of CIII-DT (Toronto)
32 (UHF)	32	11	CHCH-TV-6	Independent	Rebroadcaster of CHCH-DT (Hamilton)
–	–	12 (SD) & 700 (HD)	–	YourTV	Community channel for Cogeco subscribers.

== Print ==
The city's main newspapers are the North Bay Nugget, a daily, and the weekly North Bay Nipissing News

== Outdoor ==
Canada's largest outdoor advertising company, Pattison Outdoor Advertising, has a local office in North Bay.

== Internet ==
In part due to the news cutbacks at CTV Northern Ontario in the early 2000s, several web media outlets have also emerged to provide local news coverage to North Bay. These include BayToday, North Bay Nipissing News and NBTV, and alternative media outlets such as Solvent Magazine and North Bay Scene.
