= CKSO =

CKSO may refer to:

- CJRQ-FM, a radio station (92.7 FM) licensed to Sudbury, Ontario, Canada, which held the call sign CKSO from 1935 to 1990
- CIGM, a radio station (790 AM) licensed to Sudbury, Ontario, Canada, which held the call sign CKSO-FM from 1965 to 1977
- CICI-TV, a television station (channel 5) licensed to Sudbury, Ontario, Canada, which held the call sign CKSO-TV from 1953 to 1980
- CKSO-FM, a defunct radio station (101.1 FM) licensed to Sudbury, Ontario, Canada
