= CFCH =

CFCH may refer to:

- CKFX-FM, a radio station (101.9 FM) licensed to North Bay, Ontario, Canada, which held the call sign CFCH from 1922 (Iroquois Falls until the 1930s) to 1996
- CFCH-FM, a radio station (106.3 FM) licensed to North Bay, Ontario, Canada which held the call sign CFCH-FM for a brief period in the 1940s and 1950s
- CKNY-TV, a television station (channel 10) licensed to North Bay, Ontario, Canada, which held the call sign CFCH-TV from 1960 to 1970
- CFCH-FM, a defunct radio station (103.5 FM) licensed to Chase, British Columbia, Canada which held the call sign CFCH-FM from 2004 to 2014
- CFCH-FM, a current radio station (90.5 FM) licensed to North Bay, Ontario, Canada which signed on the air on June 15, 2021 bringing back the heritage CFCH call sign to North Bay as CFCH-FM
