= Q92 =

Q92 (or 92Q) may refer to:

== Radio stations ==
=== Canada ===
- CFQR-FM, in Montreal, Quebec (identified as Q92 from 1992 to 2009)
- CJRQ-FM, in Sudbury, Ontario
- CJQQ-FM, in Timmins, Ontario

=== United States ===
- KBLQ, in Logan, Utah
- KQRQ, in Rapid City, South Dakota
- KQRS-FM, in Minneapolis-St. Paul, Minnesota
- WDJQ, in Canton, Ohio
- WERQ-FM, in Baltimore, Maryland (as 92Q)
- WRNQ, in Poughkeepsie, New York
- WYRQ-FM, in Little Falls, Minnesota
- KQVT, in Victoria, Texas
- WKRK-FM, in Cleveland Heights, Ohio (identified as 92Q from 1985 to 1989)
- WMEQ-FM, in Menomonie, Wisconsin (identified as Q92 from 1980 to 1993)
- KACO, in Lawton, Oklahoma (identified as Q92 from 1984 to 1987)

== Other uses ==
- Al-Lail, a surah of the Quran
- French submarine Gustave Zédé (1913)
