= CIKR =

CIKR may refer to:

- CIKR-FM, "K-Rock 105.7", a radio station in Kingston, Ontario, Canada
- Critical Infrastructure and Key Resources, part of the United States National Response Framework
