= CHMT-FM =

Radio station in Timmins, Ontario

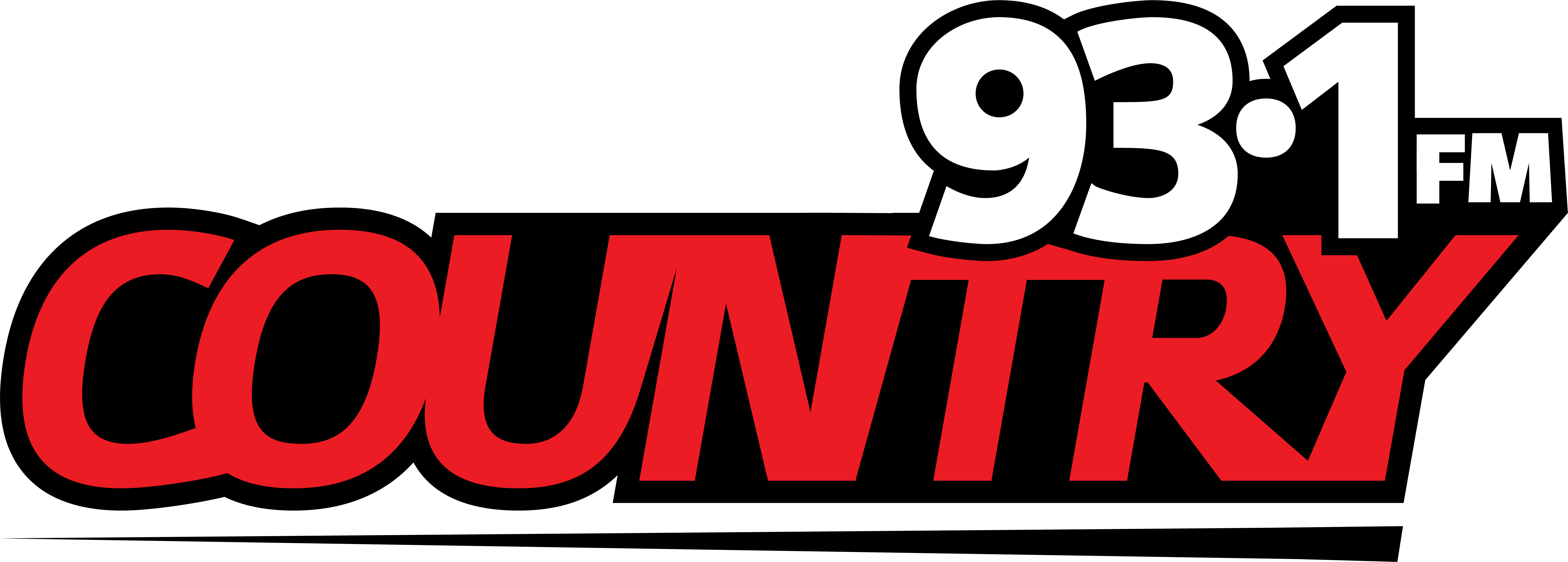
- Timmins, Ontario; Canada
- Frequency: 93.1 MHz
- Branding: Country 93.1

Programming
- Format: Country

Ownership
- Owner: Vista Broadcast Group

History
- First air date: February 9, 2001
- Call sign meaning: "Mix Timmins" (former branding and broadcast area)

Technical information
- Class: B1
- ERP: 16,400 watts
- HAAT: 95 metres (312 ft)
- Transmitter coordinates: 48°27′57″N 81°26′52″W

Links
- Webcast: Listen Live
- Website: mytimminsnow.com

CHMT-FM is a Canadian radio station, broadcasting at 93.1 FM in Timmins, Ontario, Canada. Owned by Vista Radio, it broadcasts a country format branded as Country 93.1.

== History ==
The Haliburton Broadcasting Group was licensed by the CRTC in February 2001 to open up a new English-language commercial FM radio station in Timmins.

The station originally launched in 2001 as an adult contemporary station, branded as Mix 93. Some current hot AC/CHR singles were dayparted into the evening and overnight periods. However, around the same time as CHMT's launch in 2001, Telemedia moved the competing CKGB to FM as well as flipping that station's format from country to AC.

CHMT briefly responded by playing at least one country song an hour; eventually, amid competition between the two stations for audience share and advertising revenue, CHMT adopted the "Moose FM" branding and a country format in 2002.

In 2005, Haliburton Broadcasting group received a license for a new FM radio station at 106.3 in North Bay, for which they proposed a format based on that of CHMT. The station launched in 2006 under the call letters CFXN.

On March 13, 2006, after a day of stunting with all-Shania Twain music, the station dropped country music for an adult hits format as The Moose 93.1 FM.

On April 5, 2011, Haliburton Broadcasting applied to the CRTC to increase CHMT-FM's signal from 3,600 to 16,400 watts, by increasing the effective height of antenna above average terrain from 75.8 to 95 metres, and by changing its class from A to B1. This was approved on June 3, 2011.

On April 23, 2012, Vista Broadcast Group, which owns a number of radio stations in western Canada, announced a deal to acquire Haliburton Broadcasting Group, in cooperation with Westerkirk Capital. The transaction was approved by the CRTC on October 19, 2012.

On May 20, 2022, at 8:00 a.m., the station flipped back to country, rebranding as Country 93.1. The first song played was "Play Something Country" by Brooks and Dunn.
