= CKLG-FM =

CKLG-FM may refer to:

- a rebroadcaster (107.5 FM) of CISQ-FM licensed to Egmont, British Columbia, Canada
- CFOX-FM, a radio station (99.3 FM) licensed to Vancouver, British Columbia, Canada, which held the call sign CKLG-FM from 1964 to 1979
- CJAX-FM, a radio station (96.9 FM) licensed to Vancouver, British Columbia, Canada, which held the call sign CKLG-FM from 2002 to 2014
