= CKFX-FM =

Radio station in North Bay, Ontario

Coordinates: 46°18′10″N 79°24′39″W

- North Bay, Ontario; Canada
- Broadcast area: Nipissing District
- Frequency: 101.9 MHz
- Branding: 101.9 The Fox

Programming
- Format: Mainstream rock

Ownership
- Owner: Rogers Radio; (Rogers Media, Inc.)
- Sister stations: CKAT, CHUR-FM

History
- First air date: 1922
- Former call signs: CFCH (1922–1996)
- Former frequencies: 930 kHz (AM) (1922–1941); 1230 kHz (1941–1942); 600 kHz (1942–1996)
- Call sign meaning: "Fox" (current branding)

Technical information
- Class: C
- ERP: 100,000 watts
- HAAT: 145 metres (476 ft)

Links
- Website: www.thefoxnorthbay.com

CKFX-FM (101.9 MHz) is a Canadian radio station in North Bay, Ontario. The station airs a mainstream rock format under the brand name 101.9 The Fox. The station uses the same general format as, and shares some programming with, CJRQ-FM in Sudbury and CJQQ-FM in Timmins.

== History ==
The station was originally launched in Iroquois Falls in 1922, as CFCH, a corporate communications service for lumber camps owned by Abitibi Power and Paper Company. It was subsequently acquired by Roy Thomson in 1930, and moved to North Bay. The station originally launched in North Bay at 930 on the AM dial, moving to 1230 in 1941 and then to 600 in 1942. CFCH was on the FM dial at 106.3 MHz for a brief period in the 1940s and 1950s. The 106.3 MHz frequency is now occupied by CFXN-FM.

In 1960, Thomson's Northern Broadcasting acquired the city's television station, CKGN, which also adopted the CFCH callsign. In 1976, Northern also acquired the FM station CKAT. Thomson subsequently sold Northern Broadcasting to a local business consortium in 1974. In 1980, the stations were sold to Telemedia.

CFCH was an affiliate of the Canadian Broadcasting Corporation's Trans-Canada Network and then of CBC Radio, until 1976 when CBCN-FM launched.

Over the years, CFCH went through a number of formats. In the 1980s, CFCH 600 was a Top 40 Hit Radio format, then changed to 'lite' rock in the early 1990s, and the short-lived news/talk in March 1996.

On August 16, 1996, Telemedia swapped the stations in a move similar to its 1990 switch involving CKSO and CIGM in Sudbury. Country music station CKAT took over CFCH's AM frequency, and CFCH moved to the FM station, adopted its current CKFX-FM callsign with a new rock music format and a new branding 102 FM The Fox. (The former CFCH callsign recently belonged to a radio station out in Chase, British Columbia. The heritage CFCH call sign returned in North Bay at a radio station (as CFCH-FM) that was launched by Vista Broadcast Group at 90.5 FM on June 15, 2021).

In 2002, Telemedia sold the stations to Standard Broadcasting, who shortly sold them to Rogers Communications.

In June 2013, Rogers Communications rebranded 102 FM The Fox to 101.9 The Fox and changing the slogan from "North Bay's Best Rock" to "World Class Rock."

On June 7, 2016, the station was rebranded 101.9 Rock.

CKFX and its co-branded sister stations in Sudbury and Timmins currently air a mixture of locally-hosted dayparts with syndicated programming, including the Brock & Dalby morning show from CIKR-FM Kingston, and the internationally syndicated Greg Beharrell Show in the evenings.

On June 28, 2024, Rogers dropped the 101.9 Rock branding and resurrected the original 1990s The Fox branding. Rogers had also resurrected the original 1990s brandings for CJQQ-FM Timmins (as Q92) and CJRQ-FM Sudbury (as Q92).

== Former logos ==
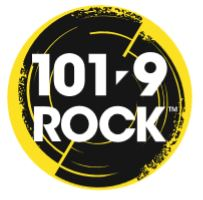
101.9 Rock logo from 2016–2024

== See also ==
- CFCH
