= EZ Rock =

Canadian radio network

- Type: Radio network
- Country: Canada

Programming
- Format: Adult contemporary

Ownership
- Owner: Bell Media (Bell Media Radio)

History
- Founded: by Telemedia
- Launch date: June 30, 1995
- Closed: May 18, 2021

Links
- Website: (see each station's articles)

EZ Rock was a brand of adult contemporary radio stations heard primarily in Canada. The branding was originally created by Telemedia in the mid-1990s for its AC stations, and based on the call sign of its former Toronto flagship CJEZ-FM (now adult hits-formatted CHBM-FM).

Via acquisitions, control of the "EZ Rock" brand passed from Telemedia to Astral Media and later Bell Media. By 2021, as the majority of its owned-and-operated stations had been shifted to one of Bell Media's other standardized station formats, such as Pure Country, Move Radio (AC, which replaced Ontario's final "EZ Rock" station CHRE-FM in St. Catharines, and Kelowna's CILK-FM), or Virgin Radio (CHR/Top 40), the only remaining "EZ Rock" stations were in British Columbia. On May 18, 2021, the final "EZ Rock" stations flipped to adult hits under Bell's "Bounce Radio" brand.

== History ==
Logo of the original EZ Rock station, CJEZ/Toronto

Ownership of the EZ Rock brand passed from Telemedia to Standard Broadcasting in 2002, to Astral Media in 2007, and to Bell Media in 2013.

On August 29, 2013, Rogers Media's "EZ Rock" stations in Northern Ontario switched to the company's standard "Kiss" brand (heard primarily on CHR stations); these stations were former Standard stations that were acquired by Rogers in 2002.

As of January 2021, the "EZ Rock" branding was mostly heard on Bell Media-owned stations in British Columbia making it the last Canadian province to use the "EZ Rock" branding since the other stations have rebranded to Move Radio. On May 18, 2021, Bell flipped all remaining "EZ Rock" stations to its new adult hits branding "Bounce Radio".

== Programming ==
The EZ Rock stations were generally programmed independently, although special Canadian content versions of shows such as Delilah and the John Tesh Radio Show were heard across the network. Several marketing stations like London and St. Catharines also heard is On Air with Ryan Seacrest and Rick Dees Weekly Top 40 as well. Some stations in smaller markets may also share voice-tracked programming in weekend and overnight slots.

== Former EZ Rock stations ==
All stations are owned by Bell Media Radio, unless otherwise specified.

=== Alberta ===
- Edmonton - CFMG-FM (identified as EZ Rock from 1990s until 2011)

=== British Columbia ===
- Summerland - CHOR-FM (identified as EZ Rock from June 17, 2010 until May 18, 2021)
- Penticton - CKOR (identified as EZ Rock from 1999 until May 18, 2021)
- Osoyoos - CJOR (identified as EZ Rock from until May 18, 2021)
- Salmon Arm - CKXR-FM (identified as EZ Rock from 1999 until May 18, 2021)
- Revelstoke - CKCR-FM (identified as EZ Rock from until May 18, 2021)
- Golden - CKGR-FM (identified as EZ Rock from until May 18, 2021)
- Trail - CJAT-FM (identified as EZ Rock from October 5, 2011 until May 18, 2021)
- Nelson - CKKC-FM (identified as EZ Rock from until May 18, 2021)
- Prince Rupert - CHTK-FM (identified as EZ Rock from October 2011 until May 18, 2021)
- Terrace - CFTK (identified as EZ Rock from October 2011 until May 18, 2021)
- Kitimat - CKTK-FM (identified as EZ Rock from October 2011 until May 18, 2021)
- Kelowna - CILK-FM (identified as EZ Rock from January 2011 until December 27, 2020)

=== New Brunswick ===
- Fredericton - CIBX-FM (identified as EZ Rock from 2000 until 2005)
- Woodstock - CJCJ-FM (identified as EZ Rock from 1999 until 2009)

=== Nova Scotia ===
- Truro - CKTO-FM (identified as EZ Rock from 2001 until 2002)

=== Ontario ===
- Orillia - CICX-FM (identified as EZ Rock from 1996 until 2002; former Standard/Rogers station owned by Larche Communications, but later sold to Bell Media)
- Ottawa - CJOT-FM (identified as EZ Rock from May 27, 2010 until June 30, 2011, former flagship station; now owned by Corus Radio)
- Toronto - CHBM-FM (identified as EZ Rock from 1995 until 2009 using the CJEZ-FM callsign, former flagship station; now owned by Stingray Group)
- London - CIQM-FM (identified as EZ Rock from 1996 until August 17, 2012)
- North Bay - CHUR-FM (identified as EZ Rock from 1999 until August 29, 2013; owned by Rogers Sports & Media)
- Sault Ste. Marie - CHAS-FM (identified as EZ Rock from 1999 until August 29, 2013; owned by Rogers Sports & Media)
- St. Catharines - CHRE-FM (identified as EZ Rock from 2001 until December 27, 2020; last Ontario station to use the brand)
- Sudbury - CJMX-FM (identified as EZ Rock from 1999 until August 29, 2013; owned by Rogers Sport & Media)
- Timmins - CKGB-FM (identified as EZ Rock from 2001 until August 29, 2013; owned by Rogers Sports & Media)
