= CHNO-FM =

Radio station in Sudbury, Ontario

Coordinates: 46.50737°N 80.94502°W

- Sudbury, Ontario; Canada
- Broadcast area: Greater Sudbury
- Frequency: 103.9 MHz
- Branding: Rewind 103.9

Programming
- Format: Classic hits

Ownership
- Owner: Stingray Radio
- Sister stations: CIGM-FM

History
- First air date: June 24, 1947
- Former frequencies: 1440 kHz (1947–1954); 900 kHz (1954–1969); 550 kHz (1969–2000)
- Call sign meaning: Northern Ontario (broadcast area)

Technical information
- Class: C1
- ERP: vertical polarization: 43,000 watts horizontal polarization: 100,000 watts
- HAAT: 150.2 metres (493 ft)

Links
- Webcast: Listen Live
- Website: rewind1039.ca

CHNO-FM is a Canadian radio station broadcasting at 103.9 FM in Sudbury, Ontario. Owned and operated by Stingray Radio, the station is branded on-air as Rewind 103.9 with a classic hits format.

== History ==
The station began broadcasting on June 24, 1947 on AM 1440. It was a bilingual radio station, airing programming in both English and French, and was an affiliate of both CBC Radio's Dominion Network and Radio-Canada. It was operated by Sudbury Broadcasting, a company owned by F. Baxter Ricard and his wife Alma Ricard, and was the first bilingual radio station in Canada outside of Quebec.

CHNO's studios and offices were located at 166 Elm Street West in Sudbury, while the RCA transmitter and two towers were situated in the McFarlane Lake district of Sudbury, along Burwash Road, on part of Lot 3, Concession 6, Broder Township.

In 1952, the station was the subject of controversy when Ricard refused to permit Local 598 of the International Union of Mine, Mill and Smelter Workers to purchase airtime on the station for a labour-oriented news program, on the grounds that the program represented "Communist propaganda". His objection had less to do with the program's spoken content and more to do with the host's choice of interstitial music between segments, including a song by Paul Robeson.

On November 9, 1954, CHNO moved to AM 900.

In 1957, Ricard opened CFBR on AM 550 as a full-time French-language station, and CHNO switched to full-time English. The licensing of CFBR, which took over the Radio-Canada affiliation from CHNO, made Sudbury Broadcasting the first commercial broadcaster in Canada licensed to operate two AM radio stations in the same city. In 1962, the station became independent following the dissolution of the Dominion Network. On December 31, 1969, CFBR and CHNO swapped frequencies, CHNO moving to 550 and CFBR taking over the 900 slot. On May 14, 1976, the CRTC denied an application by Sudbury Broadcasting Co. Ltd. to change CHNO's frequency from 550 kHz to 570 kHz.

In 1979, CHNO and CFBR moved out of their Elm Street building and moved to their new location at 295 Victoria Street in the old King George School building to accommodate a new FM station.

In 1980, Sudbury Broadcasting launched a new FM station CJMX. That same year, CHNO received approval to increase daytime power from 10,000 watts to 50,000 watts with the nighttime power to remain at 10,000 watts and would remain on 550 kHz. Also in 1980, Ricard also became a major shareholder in Mid-Canada Communications. Sudbury Broadcasting continued to operate independently, although it was eventually merged into Mid-Canada Radio in 1985. On January 3, 1990, the CRTC approved a corporate reorganization of a group of radio stations in northern Ontario, among them CHNO, CFBR and CJMX-FM into a new company “Ottawa Valley Broadcasting Company Limited.” On July 26, 1990, Mid-Canada sold the stations to Pelmorex. Following this sale, CFBR adopted the new call letters CHYC.

In the 1970s and 1980s, CHNO was Northern Ontario's most listened-to and most influential radio station, broadcasting a Top 40 format branded as 55 CHNO, Rock Radio CHNO 55, "Sudbury's Best Rock", and "Sudbury's Hit Music Leader", NO55 (pronounced "N-oh fifty-five"). However, the 1990 launch of CJRQ ended CHNO's dominance, and on July 6, 1992 at 6:00 AM, CHNO flipped to an oldies format as Oldies 55. After struggling through a variety of formats, including classic rock as AM 55 The Crusher in 1994, country and talk in 1995 and 1996, the station reverted to oldies in 1997. Former program director Scott Jackson, now the manager of CJLF-FM in Barrie, has stated that CHNO and CJMX were the most neglected stations in the entire Pelmorex corporate family during the time that he worked there, despite being the network's nominal flagships. Also in 1997, CHNO, CHYC and CJMX-FM moved out of their 295 Victoria Street building into a new location at 493-B Barrydowne Road, where CHNO still remains to this day.

In 1998, Pelmorex sold CJMX to Telemedia. The following year, Pelmorex sold CHNO and CHYC to Haliburton Broadcasting Group.

=== Switch to FM ===
Haliburton applied to the CRTC to move both CHNO and CHYC to FM, which was approved on August 31, 1999. In November 1999, CHNO dropped its oldies format and adopted its new CHR/Top 40 format and Z103 branding on the old AM frequency a few months before the station made its official move to FM. CHNO began testing its 103.9 FM signal just days before officially launching on February 3, 2000. The FM and AM signals aired simultaneously for a few weeks, and on February 29, the AM signal was closed permanently.

The station was originally licensed to broadcast at 100 kWs, but because of transmitter interference to the Greater Sudbury Airport the station's license was permanently amended to 11 kilowatts.

As "Z103", the station recovered significantly in the local BBM ratings, jumping to a 22.1 per cent share of the local radio audience in 2000 from just 7.3 per cent in the 1999 ratings book.

As a Top 40 station, Z103 hosted live-to-air programs from area nightclubs in the city, as well as syndicated shows such as the Rick Dees Weekly Top 40, American Top 40 and Canadian Hit 30 Countdown. Positioning slogans during the Top 40 period included "Sudbury's Best Music", "Today's Best Music" and "Sudbury's #1 Hit Music Station."

On November 9, 2001, Haliburton sold CHNO to Newcap Broadcasting. Despite no longer having common ownership, however, CHYC and CHNO continued to operate from the same studio facility at 493 Barrydowne Road in Sudbury until 2009.

Newcap and Rogers Media soon entered into a joint sales agreement, under which Rogers held responsibility for advertising sales on CHNO as well as on its own CJRQ, CIGM and CJMX. In 2002, however, Friends of Canadian Broadcasting filed a brief with the CRTC opposing the station's license renewal — FCB took the position that in practice, the agreement was extending well beyond advertising sales and into both program production and news gathering, and thus constituted an illegal de facto local management agreement. On January 31, 2005, the CRTC disallowed the agreement, ruling in its license renewals for the four stations that the agreement must be terminated no later than May 31 of that year.

== Big Daddy ==
At 12:00 AM on January 1, 2006, with little or no warning, the station flipped to a variety hits format branded as Big Daddy 103.9 with slogan "Playing Anything", ending another era of Top 40 music in the Sudbury market. The last song on "Z" was "Lose Yourself" by Eminem, while the first song on "Big Daddy" was "Start Me Up" by The Rolling Stones. General manager Darlene Palmer said the station wanted to offer Sudbury "music you can dance to, sing to, date to, divorce to." Some promotional bumpers for the station featured a stiff-voiced character representing "Big Daddy" himself. The stiff-voiced character was replaced by a new one around the middle of 2008.

In the first quarter BBM ratings for 2006, CHNO's first ratings book under the Big Daddy format, the station regained the #1 status in the Sudbury market for the first time since 1990. However, the move was controversial with some of the station's prior listeners, and in July 2006, just seven months after flipping CHNO to the adult hits format, Newcap applied to the CRTC for a new contemporary hit radio station in the Sudbury market. In the application, Newcap stated that its market research found that a contemporary hit radio station could only be profitable in the market as one station within an ownership cluster, and not as a standalone entity. However, the application was denied by the CRTC on July 12, 2007.

The denial of the proposed CHR/Top 40 station also became controversial, in part because the station that was licensed, CICS-FM, duplicated the format of an existing station in the market, Rogers' CIGM. In July 2008, however, Newcap announced a deal to acquire CIGM from Rogers in exchange for CFDR in Halifax. Both CIGM and CFDR were the sole remaining AM stations in their respective markets, and in both cases the current owner already had the maximum permitted number of FM stations in the applicable market, whereas the acquirer only had a single FM station. Both companies applied to move the stations to FM as part of the trade. This deal was approved on November 24, 2008.

On June 25, 2009, Newcap received approval from the CRTC to increase CHNO-FM's effected radiated power from 11,000 watts to 100,000 watts, to increase the station's antenna height and to relocate the transmitter. On August 17, 2009, the station increased their power to 100,000 watts the same day CHNO-FM's sister station CIGM-FM began on-air tests at 93.5 FM.

== 2010 Format Change ==
On May 21, 2010, at 12:00 AM without warning, the station dropped adult hits and switched to its current classic hits format as Rewind 103.9, playing 1960s, 1970s, 1980s and 1990s music with the slogan "Sudbury's Greatest Hits". The first song after the change was Bob Seger's "Old Time Rock and Roll". In 2011, CHNO-FM aired syndicated programs such as the 1970s reruns of American Top 40 with Casey Kasem, the Classic Countdown with Dick Bartley and the Donny Osmond show. The syndicated daily radio show, Daily Dees, hosted by Rick Dees was heard each weeknight. The station, like most classic hits stations, has evolved to playing more 80's and 90's and currently uses the slogan "70's, 80's and More!".

Despite the different branding, the station is closely aligned with Stingray's Boom FM-branded stations, with similar logo designs and partial sharing of programs and personalities.

== Former Logo ==
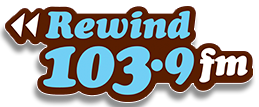
