= CHAS-FM =

Radio station in Sault Ste. Marie, Ontario

Coordinates: 46°35′40″N 84°21′00″W

- Sault Ste. Marie, Ontario; Canada
- Broadcast area: Algoma District; Chippewa County, Michigan
- Frequency: 100.5 MHz
- Branding: KiSS 100.5

Programming
- Format: Hot adult contemporary

Ownership
- Owner: Rogers Radio; (Rogers Media, Inc.)
- Sister stations: CJQM-FM

History
- First air date: May 15, 1964
- Former call signs: CJIC-FM (1964–1977)

Technical information
- Licensing authority: CRTC
- Class: C
- ERP: 13,900 watts
- HAAT: 125 metres (410 ft)

Links
- Webcast: Listen Live
- Website: kisssoo.com

CHAS-FM (100.5 MHz) is a radio station licensed to and serving Sault Ste. Marie, Ontario, Canada. Owned and operated by Rogers Radio, a division of Rogers Sports & Media, the station broadcasts a hot adult contemporary format branded as Kiss 100.5.

== History ==
The station was originally launched by Highland Broadcasting on May 15, 1964 as CJIC-FM, a sister station to CJIC and CJIC-TV. In 1976, the stations briefly became the property of Huron Broadcasting, retained the television station but sold the radio stations to Gilder Broadcasting under concentration of media ownership rules. With the TV and radio stations no longer having common ownership, the radio stations adopted the new callsigns and signed on as CFYN (for the AM station) and CHAS on February 1, 1977.

The original on air schedule of CHAS included Berg Neuman from 6:00 - 10:00 a.m., CBC Radio's Morningside from 10:00 a.m. - noon, Brian W. Martin from noon - 2:00 p.m., Fred Edwards from 2:00 - 6:00 p.m., Tony Marziale from 6:00 – 10:00 p.m., CBC Radio's The World at Ten and Mostly Music from 10:00 p.m. - midnight and "The Incredible Rod Wayne" from midnight – 6:00 a.m. The station dropped its CBC programming after CBSM was launched in 1981.

In 1985, CFYN and CHAS were sold to Telemedia. Telemedia refined the "Beautiful Music" format of CHAS, incorporating elements of the "Music of Your Life" format to create a hybrid that was targeted mainly at the 45 plus listener.

As the influence of Sault Ste. Marie, Michigan's WYSS attracted more of the Ontario audience, pressure to follow suit grew. CHAS evolved to a younger sound, moving the format to adult contemporary and adopting Lite 100.5 as the station's branding, later changing to Mix 100.

By the early 1990s, the Sault Ste. Marie area's economic circumstances combined with diminishing audiences on both of the city's Canadian commercial AM stations severely curtailed the profitability of Telemedia's Soo radio operations, prompting Telemedia to enter into a local management agreement (LMA) with Pelmorex, retaining ownership of CHAS but giving Pelmorex the management rights; the companies' Sault AM signals (Telemedia's CFYN and Pelmorex's CKCY) would be turned off as part of the deal. The arrangement, one of the first LMAs in the Canadian radio industry, took effect on August 31, 1992, with CHAS moving into CJQM-FM's studios at 642 Great Northern Road, where the two stations remain to this day. The deal also saw all but 3 CHAS staffers being laid off: Marlene Yanni would stay on as sales representative, while James Warner-Smith would become program director; Gino Cavallo was offered the news/sports director position, but instead accepted a public relations and play-by-play position with the Sault Ste. Marie Greyhounds hockey club. Several former CKCY staffers would join CHAS, including Frank Raven, Scott Turnbull, the late John Campbell, the late John Murtha, the late Mitch Drolet and the late Dan Bonk.

CHAS continued to broadcast for the next seven years as "Mix 100". Among the benchmarks of that time for the station, were reaching a weekly audience of 30,000 listeners and negotiating the broadcast rights for all Greyhounds home and away games away from the Sault Ste. Marie, Michigan-based WKNW.

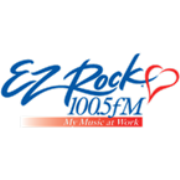
Former "EZ Rock" logo (1999–2013)

In 1999, Telemedia bought CJQM from Pelmorex, assuming full control of both CJQM and CHAS. At this point, CHAS and 3 other Telemedia-owned stations in Northern Ontario adopted the "EZ Rock" format and branding patterned after Standard Broadcasting's CJEZ-FM in Toronto. Standard Broadcasting would acquire several Telemedia-owned stations in 2002; CHAS and CJQM were among those stations, but they would be sold to Rogers Radio almost immediately.

On July 4, 2011, CHAS altered its musical format, keeping the "EZ Rock" branding but presenting a more contemporary version of its AC Mainstream Plus blend. With this shift, the station cancelled 'The 80's Lunch program and Sunday at the '70s. Solid Gold Saturday Night was replaced by The Saturday Night Show, a program featuring music from the 1970s to present. Scott Turnbull remains as host. The station also adopted a new logo as well as the positioning statement "Today's Best Music".

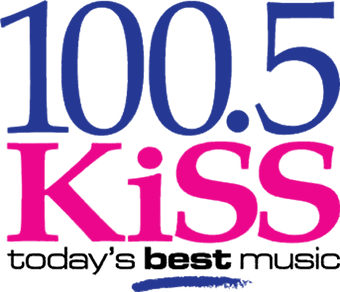
Former "Kiss" logo (2013–2017)

CHAS, as noted above, was one of four EZ Rock-branded stations owned and operated by Rogers Media, all of which are located in Northern Ontario (the others being CKGB-FM Timmins, CHUR-FM North Bay, and CJMX-FM Sudbury). With the June 2013 acquisition by Bell Media Radio of Astral Media, which owned the "EZ Rock" trademark in Canada, Rogers would seek new branding for all 4 of its EZ Rock stations; on August 29, 2013, CHAS and its "EZ Rock" stations all adopted the "Kiss" branding, with no other discernible on-air changes.

As of the fall of 2019, CHAS-FM and the other "KISS" stations had returned to a mainstream adult contemporary direction with a playlist spanning the 1980s to today's hits.

In 2020, CHAS changed its moniker to "The New KiSS 100.5", but kept the same slogan and format. The station began carrying the Roz and Mocha Show from CKIS-FM Toronto which also airs on other Rogers-owned "Kiss" stations across Canada.
