= CFCH-FM (British Columbia) =

Former radio station in British Columbia, Canada

- Chase, British Columbia; Canada
- Frequency: 103.5 MHz

Ownership
- Owner: Chase and District Community Radio Society

History
- First air date: 2005
- Last air date: August 31, 2014

Technical information
- ERP: 4.7 watts
- Transmitter coordinates: 50°49′N 119°41′W

CFCH-FM was a Canadian community radio station that broadcast at 103.5 FM in Chase, British Columbia, last owned by the Chase and District Community Radio Society.

== History ==
On October 6, 2004, the CRTC approved the Chase and District Lions Community Club's application to operate an English-language developmental community FM radio station, broadcasting at 103.5 MHz with an effective radiated power of 4.7 watts. The station commenced broadcasting in 2005. Ownership was transferred to the Chase and District Community Radio Society in 2007.

On August 1, 2008, the CRTC approved the radio society's application for a regular, English-language, low-power Type B community FM radio station at 103.5 MHz (channel 278LP) with an effective radiated power of 19.7 watts.

CFCH-FM ceased broadcasting on August 31, 2014, due to lack of community support. The society's request to the CRTC to revoke its broadcasting license was approved on October 14, 2014.

== Call sign ==
CFCH was the call sign used by a radio station in North Bay, Ontario, known today as CKFX-FM. On May 25, 2020, Vista Radio, which owns CFXN-FM, was approved to operate a new FM radio station in North Bay and has reused the CFCH-FM call sign since June 15, 2021.

== See also ==
- RWSfm 103.3: Former Lions radio station in England
