= CJMX-FM =

Radio station in Sudbury, Ontario

Coordinates: 46°30′03″N 81°01′12″W

- Sudbury, Ontario; Canada
- Broadcast area: Greater Sudbury
- Frequency: 105.3 MHz
- Branding: KiSS 105.3

Programming
- Format: Hot adult contemporary

Ownership
- Owner: Rogers Radio; (Rogers Media, Inc.)
- Sister stations: CJRQ-FM

History
- First air date: October 13, 1980
- Call sign meaning: "Mix" (former branding)

Technical information
- Class: C
- ERP: 100,000 watts
- HAAT: 285 metres (935 ft)

Links
- Website: kisssudbury.com

CJMX-FM (105.3 MHz) is a Canadian radio station, which broadcasts a hot adult contemporary format in Sudbury, Ontario. The station uses the on-air brand KiSS 105.3. The station is owned by Rogers Radio, a division of Rogers Sports & Media.

== History ==
On April 12, 1979, the CRTC approved an application by the Sudbury Broadcasting Company Limited to operate a new English language FM radio station at Sudbury, Ontario on the frequency 105.3 MHz with an effective radiated power of 100,000 watts.

CJMX was established on October 13, 1980 by F. Baxter Ricard and Alma Ricard, the owners of Sudbury's CHNO and CFBR. CJMX's studios were located in the old King George School building at 295 Victoria Street until 1997. Its transmitter site was shared with CICI-TV and CIGM-FM near Huron Street in Sudbury.

In the 1980s the station aired a beautiful music/easy listening format that was branded as CJMX Stereo 105 and FM 105 CJMX. The stations became part of Mid-Canada Radio in 1985, and were then sold to the Pelmorex Radio Network in 1990. Pelmorex's ownership of the stations was controversial, as most of their programming was delivered by satellite from a facility in Mississauga. Under Pelmorex's ownership, the station was branded as Mix 105, and aired a more hot adult contemporary format.

After a change in CRTC media ownership rules, Pelmorex sold CJMX to Telemedia, the owner of CJRQ and CIGM, in 1998. In late April 1999, shortly after the Telemedia purchase was finalized, CJMX dropped its hot AC format in favour of a soft AC format with the "EZ Rock" branding and moved from the 493B Barrydowne studios to 880 LaSalle Boulevard Telemedia studios to join with sister stations CIGM and CJRQ-FM. Prior to the change to "EZ Rock", CJMX aired the syndicated countdown show Rick Dees Weekly Top 40 on Saturday afternoons from June 1998, until its last airing on February 13, 1999. The station had also aired satellite programming by Pelmorex radio. Pelmorex subsequently sold its other stations (CHNO and CHYC) in Sudbury to Haliburton Broadcasting Group.

In the late 1990s and early 2000s, CJMX overtook former ratings leader CJRQ in the market, based in part on actively promoting itself as a station suitable for workplace listening. In 2006, however, it lost that status to a resurgent CHNO after the latter station flipped to an adult hits format. Telemedia was acquired by Standard Broadcasting in 2002, but Standard sold the "EZ Rock" stations in Northern Ontario to Rogers before the main acquisition had closed and received regulatory approval.

Under Rogers ownership in 2002, the station laid off several employees, including Dave Lindsay, afternoon drive time disc jockey and president of Communications, Energy and Paperworkers Union Local 725-M, which represented staff at CJMX and CHNO. Lindsay was replaced in the shift by program director Mike Allard. It was alleged in the press that Lindsay may have been targeted as a union leader, and the layoff was contested; eventually, Lindsay returned to the afternoon shift.

In late October 2004, a fire damaged a transmission line at the transmitter that knocked CJMX off the air for 25 hours. A replacement antenna was brought in from Thunder Bay to get the station back on the air. The station went back to its regular 100 kW power months after the fire.

In 2009, CJMX's sister station CIGM was sold to Newcap Broadcasting, then moved to the FM dial in August that same year.

In July 2011, the station altered its musical format to present a more contemporary version of its AC Mainstream Plus blend. With this shift, the station cancelled The 80's Lunch program and Sunday at the 70's. Solid Gold Saturday Night was replaced by The Saturday Night Show, a program featuring music from the 70s to present. Scott Turnbull remains as host. The station also adopted a new logo as well as the positioning statement "Today's Best Music".

By January 2012, more hot adult contemporary and rhythmic contemporary hits were added to the playlist; however, the station is still a Canadian adult contemporary reporter per Mediabase & Nielsen BDS. This was in order to compete up against CHR/Top 40 station CIGM-FM and lessen the competition with Newcap Broadcasting classic hits station CHNO-FM. The station also unveiled the HitStorm countdown, based out of Toronto's CKIS-FM. In addition, most of the 80s hits were reduced, all pre-1979 hits faded and has also retained the "EZ Rock" branding. By June 2012, the station dropped the entire 80s library and most of pre-2000 music from its playlist, making it one of the few AC stations to not follow the adult contemporary pattern. On June 27, 2012, the station was moved to the Nielsen BDS Canadian hot AC panel, but Mediabase still reported the station on the Canadian AC panel (until July 20, 2012) and per parent Rogers Radio & RadioStationWorld.com, still describes the station as an AC. Rival CHYC-FM airs a French hot AC format with some English hits mixed in.

On August 7, 2012, Rogers received approval to change the authorized contours of the radio programming undertakings CJRQ-FM and CJMX Sudbury, in order to change the polarization of CJRQ's antenna, and to increase CJMX's effective height of antenna above average terrain from 227.5 to 285 metres.

CJMX was one of four "EZ Rock" stations owned and operated by Rogers Media, all of which are located in Northern Ontario (the others being CKGB-FM Timmins, CHUR-FM North Bay, and CHAS-FM Sault Ste. Marie). On August 29, 2013, all of the "EZ Rock" stations were rebranded to "Kiss", discarding the "EZ Rock" branding owned by Bell Media.

On May 24, 2015, Rich Griffin, the morning host on CJMX died of a brain aneurysm at the age of 52. Griffin recently celebrated 14 years as a morning show host for CJMX in April. A moment of silence was held on all Sudbury radio stations at 9:00am EDT, May 25, 2015.

== Former logos ==
MIX 105 logo used for CJMX in the 1990s until 1999

EZ Rock logo used from 1999 to 2011

== Notes ==
On January 3, 1990, the CRTC approved a corporate reorganization of the group of radio stations in northern Ontario, among them CHNO, CFBR and CJMX-FM into a new company “Ottawa Valley Broadcasting Co. Ltd.”
