= CKAT =

Radio station in North Bay, Ontario

Coordinates: 46°10′45″N 79°27′48″W

- North Bay, Ontario; Canada
- Broadcast area: Nipissing District
- Frequency: 600 kHz
- Branding: Country 600

Programming
- Format: Full service country music
- Affiliations: Toronto Blue Jays Radio Network

Ownership
- Owner: Rogers Radio; (Rogers Media, Inc.)
- Sister stations: CKFX-FM, CHUR-FM

History
- First air date: 1967 (FM); 1996 (AM)
- Former frequencies: 93.7 MHz (FM) (1967–1979); 101.9 MHz (1979–1996)

Technical information
- Class: B
- Power: 10,000 watts day 5,000 watts night

Links
- Website: www.seekyoursounds.com/radio/country600

CKAT (600 AM) is a Canadian radio station in North Bay, Ontario. The station, owned by Rogers Radio, a division of Rogers Sports & Media, airs a country, news and sports format.

== History ==
The station originally launched in 1967 at 93.7 FM, and was acquired by Northern Broadcasting, the owners of CFCH.

In 1979, CKAT adopted a country format and moved to 101.9 FM. In 1980, CKAT and CFCH were sold to Telemedia.

In 1996, Telemedia swapped the stations in a move similar to its 1990 switch involving CKSO and CIGM in Sudbury. CKAT took over CFCH's AM frequency, and CFCH moved to the FM station and adopted the new callsign CKFX.

In 2002, Telemedia sold the stations to Standard Broadcasting, who shortly sold them to Rogers.

In fall 2005, CKAT and CIGM underwent a format change, with country music cut back (although not entirely eliminated) in favour of increased news and sports programming. Since the change, both stations used the following slogans such as "Today's Country", "News Leader" and "Sports Leader".

The station's general manager is Peter McKeown, a former morning man for many years on CHUR and CKAT.

In 2009, CKAT's sister station CIGM in Sudbury (under the ownership of Rogers Media) was acquired by Newcap Radio and then converted the station to the FM dial. CKAT is currently one of the last high-powered commercial AM radio stations operating in Northern Ontario.

On July 2, 2013, at 3:00 pm, Rogers dropped the AM 600 CKAT branding with slogan "North Bay's News Leader/Today's Country" and rebranded CKAT as Country 600.

On June 15, 2021, Vista Radio, an unrelated company to CKAT launched a new FM radio station with the return of the heritage CFCH call sign in North Bay airing a country music format as Country 90.5. The launch of the new CFCH-FM makes it the second country music radio station in the North Bay market with a similar branding to Rogers' CKAT Country 600.

== Former logos ==
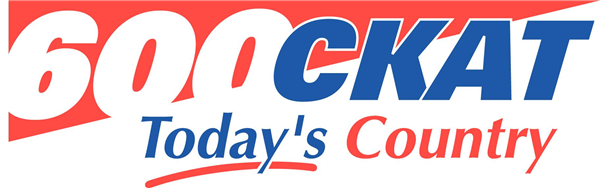
Previous 600 CKAT logo used until 2013

Alternate logo
