= CIGM-FM =

Radio station in Sudbury, Ontario

Coordinates: 46°25′29″N 81°00′53″W

- Sudbury, Ontario; Canada
- Broadcast area: Greater Sudbury
- Frequency: 93.5 MHz
- Branding: Hot 93.5

Programming
- Format: Contemporary hit radio

Ownership
- Owner: Stingray Group
- Sister stations: CHNO-FM

History
- First air date: 1965
- Former call signs: CKSO-FM (1965–1978); CIGM (1978–2009)
- Former frequencies: 92.7 MHz (1965–1990); 790 kHz (1990–2009)
- Call sign meaning: George Miller (One of the early partners in the Sudbury radio station business)

Technical information
- Class: C1
- ERP: 43,000 watts Vertical; 100,000 watts Horizontal
- HAAT: 150.2 metres (493 ft)

Links
- Website: hot935.ca

CIGM-FM is a Canadian radio station, which broadcasts in Sudbury, Ontario. The station airs a Contemporary hit radio format at 93.5 MHz on the FM dial with the branding Hot 93.5. The station is owned and operated by Stingray Group.

== History ==
The station first aired at 92.7 FM in 1965, with the call letters CKSO-FM, airing a more extensive schedule of CBC Radio programming than its AM sister station CKSO. It adopted the CIGM calls and a country format in 1978, after CBC Radio was granted a license for its own O&O station, CBCS-FM.

CIGM and CKSO were owned by Cambrian Broadcasting. The GM in the station's call sign was chosen by 1978 to honour George Miller, one of the founding investors in the company. Miller died in 1977.

As part of Cambrian's sale of CKSO-TV to Mid-Canada Communications in 1979/1980, the company's shareholders dissolved Cambrian and reincorporated themselves as a new company, called United Broadcasting, which retained ownership of the radio stations. In 1986, United Broadcasting sold CKSO and CIGM to Telemedia.

On March 16, 1990, the CRTC approved Telemedia Communications Ontario Inc.'s application to amend the Promise of Performance for CIGM by changing the music format from Group III (Country and Country-Oriented) to Group IV (40% Pop and Rock-Softer; 60% Pop and Rock-Harder). Two months later, on May 18, 1990, CKSO and CIGM swapped frequencies. CIGM moved to CKSO's 790 slot on the AM dial, and CKSO took on the new call letters CJRQ and CIGM's 92.7 FM frequency. After the 1990 swap, the CKSO call sign no longer existed in the Sudbury area until an unrelated Christian music radio station (as CKSO-FM) began test transmissions in late 2002.

In 2002, Telemedia was purchased by Standard Broadcasting. Shortly afterward, Standard sold CJRQ, CIGM and CJMX to Rogers Radio.

In fall 2005, CIGM and sister station CKAT in North Bay underwent a format change, with country music cut back, although not entirely eliminated, in favour of increased news and sports programming. After the change, both stations used slogans such as "Today's Country", "News Leader" and "Sports Leader".

=== Newcap acquisition ===
In July 2008, Rogers announced it would trade CIGM to Newcap Broadcasting in exchange for Halifax AM station CFDR. Both stations were the sole remaining AM stations in their respective markets, and in both cases the original owner already had the maximum permitted number of FM stations in the applicable market, whereas the acquirer only had a single FM station. Both companies applied to move the stations to FM as part of the trade. Newcap applied to convert CIGM to 93.5 MHz with an effective radiated power of 100,000 watts.

The applications were approved on November 24. The purchase made CIGM a sister station to Newcap's CHNO-FM.

After longtime CIGM morning man Scott Overton's employment with the station was discontinued by Rogers during the ownership transition, he wrote a letter to the Sudbury Star and Northern Life thanking the station's audience for its loyalty and indicating that the station's "long history as a country station will apparently end within the next few months." In early 2009, a number of staff at CIGM were laid off, including the news director. Notably, Newcap had applied for a new CHR/Top 40 station in the round of CRTC license hearings that resulted in the launch of CICS-FM, a competing country music station owned by Larche Communications.

In late July 2009, CIGM's website went offline with a message advising listeners to check out the EZ Rock website, the former sister station of CIGM.

=== Switch back to FM ===
Logo used during the "Kung Pao 93.5" stunting in August 2009.

On August 17, 2009, CIGM began broadcasting on 93.5 MHz, stunting with a 10-minute test broadcast with mostly classic rock music (including a clip of "Radio Ga Ga" by Queen), including clips from television theme shows (such as Seinfeld and The Flintstones), random clips of other songs, some nature sounds, and sound effects, as well as advising listeners to tune in on August 20 at 10:00 a.m. — at which time the station switched stunts to a Chinese pop music format branded as Kung Pao 93.5, which was actually mostly Chinese classical instrumentals, with a few pop songs in rotation. The same stunt format was also aired by WVHT in Norfolk, Virginia for four days in April 2009. Notably, CIGM's website during the stunt was identical to the one that had been used by WVHT during its stunt — with the exception that the name of one of the station's fictional personalities was changed to "Felony Doll", a pun on the name of CJRQ morning host Mellaney Dahl.

At midnight on August 24, AM 790 finished its last country song, "There She Goes" by Sudbury native Gil Grand, followed by an announcement:

It's been 32 years since CIGM was born. Since 1977, we've been proudly playing country music for Greater Sudbury. On behalf of everyone who has worked here over these many years, we'd like to say thanks to the loyal country fans who have shared a great journey, but the memories will last forever.

Immediately after the announcement, the station aired a steady 394.5 Hz audio tone which lasted until the simulcasting of the new programming heard on 93.5 FM began on the morning of the 24th.

The station officially launched as Hot 93.5 on August 25 at 12:00 p.m. after a stunt of a clock ticking. The first song on "Hot" was "I Gotta Feeling" by The Black Eyed Peas, which started off 10,000 songs in a row commercial free; this ended on September 21, 2009, when regular programming began. This is the first time Sudbury has had a CHR/Top 40 station since sister CHNO-FM flipped formats to adult hits on January 1, 2006. On September 26, 2009, CIGM began airing syndicated countdown shows such as the Canadian Top 20 with Jimmy T, American Top 40 with Ryan Seacrest, Canadian Hit 30 Countdown and Rick Dees Weekly Top 40. The station also includes On Air with Ryan Seacrest which runs weekdays.

On September 30, 2009, at about 5:00 p.m., the old 50,000 watt AM 790 transmitter was turned off, ending nearly 75 years of AM broadcasting in Sudbury, being the last AM radio station outlet in the city.

The Sudbury Wolves games, which were formerly aired on CIGM, moved to CJTK-FM for the 2009-2010 Ontario Hockey League season.

According to the fall 2011 BBM ratings at Milkman Unlimited dated December 1, 2011, CIGM achieved the #1 status in Greater Sudbury among adults 25-54. Since the station signed on in 2009, the station is still branded as The New Hot 93.5.

On February 23, 2013, the Rick Dees Weekly Top 40, which was carried on both Saturday and Sundays every weekend, was replaced by Hollywood Hamilton's Weekend Top 30.
