= CHMN-FM =

Radio station in Canmore, Alberta, Canada

Coordinates: 51.089°N 115.354°W

- Canmore, Alberta; Canada
- Broadcast area: Canmore and Banff
- Frequency: 106.5 MHz
- Branding: 106.5 Mountain FM

Programming
- Format: Adult contemporary; Christmas music (November-January)
- Affiliations: Canmore Eagles

Ownership
- Owner: Rogers Radio; (Rogers Media, Inc.)

History
- First air date: September 1983
- Former call signs: CFHC (1983–1997); CJMT-FM
- Former frequencies: 1450 kHz (1983–1997)
- Call sign meaning: "Mountain"

Technical information
- Class: A
- ERP: 510 watts average 1,200 watts peak
- HAAT: −467.6 metres (−1,534 ft)

Links
- Webcast: Listen Live
- Website: mountainfm.ca

CHMN-FM (106.5 MHz) is a Canadian radio station serving the Bow Valley and airs an adult contemporary format under the name 106.5 Mountain FM.

== History ==
The station began broadcasting in 1983 as CFHC on the AM band at 1450 kHz in Canmore and CFHC-1 at 1340 kHz in Banff. CFHC was a semi-satellite of sister station CFAC in Calgary until 1992.

CFHC has been through different ownerships and programming. On July 10, 1997, CFHC was given approval from the CRTC to convert to the FM band to 106.5 MHz in Canmore, becoming CHMN-FM, with a rebroadcast transmitter on the same frequency at 106.5 FM in Banff (CHMN-FM-1). After the station moved to the FM band, the old AM signals were discontinued.

Both transmitters were briefly known as CJMT-FM until it was changed back to its current call sign CHMN.

On November 20, 2000, the CRTC approved an application by Rogers Broadcasting Ltd. to increase effective radiated power for CJMT-FM Canmore from 360 watts to 510 watts.

On March 15, 2019, the CRTC approved Rogers' application to upgrade technical changes for rebroadcaster CHMN-FM-1 Banff.
