= KISS-FM (brand) =

Brand of FM radio stations

KISS-FM is the brand name of a Top 40 music format heard on FM radio stations in many cities in the United States and overseas. iHeartMedia claims ownership of the KISS-FM brand in the United States and operates most KISS-FM formatted stations there, though not KISS-FM in San Antonio, Texas, or KISS-FM America on TuneIn.

== Origin and history ==
In the late 1970s, many US radio stations began calling themselves "Kiss". Among these was KIIS-FM in Los Angeles, which adopted that call sign in 1975 when it became a sister station to KIIS (AM) — whose call sign comes not from the word "Kiss" but rather its dial position at 1150, with the letters "I" and "S" being the letters most closely resembling 1 and 5, respectively. Gannett, which owned the station, filed a federal trademark registration for "KIIS" in 1986, which has passed on to subsequent owners of the station. In 1997, Country Club Communications registered the only current federal trademark for "KISS FM" (which has since also been assigned to iHeartMedia); the logo registered then included a stylized pair of lips.

Numerous other stations using "Kiss" as (part of) a service mark were acquired over the course of Clear Channel's growth, among them WXKS-FM in Boston and WKSS in Hartford, Connecticut; however, other stations calling themselves "Kiss" which predated the "KISS FM" trademark were not acquired, such as Beasley Broadcast Group's WNKS in Charlotte. Furthermore, not all Clear Channel "Kiss" stations use the national brand; WXKS-FM has never used "KISS FM", maintaining its "Kiss 108" identity from 1979. At least one station that used a non-Clear Channel-related "Kiss" branding, WWKS in Pittsburgh, would eventually be acquired by Clear Channel itself, although that station (now WXDX-FM) would flip to a modern rock format long before being acquired by Clear Channel.

The process of bringing the KISS format to cities beyond Los Angeles was begun by Randy Michaels' Jacor Communications before Clear Channel bought it in 1999. Michaels, later Clear Channel's chief executive officer, and brand manager Todd Shannon likened the KISS model to McDonald's. "When you see the KIIS ball logo, there's no mistaking what you're going to get. It's a Top 40 product, but they're all localized inside," Shannon said in 2002.

KISS programming contains voice-tracked segments, music, and commercials that are broadcast nationwide across its stations. Despite having many consistencies, the brand's programming differs slightly based on regional demographics. Brand manager Diana Laird explained that the KISS station in Santa Barbara, California (KIST-FM, now defunct), for example, plays far more hip hop and dance music than the mainstream pop music that is heard in Boise, Idaho (KSAS-FM). But KISS listeners in Boise and in Medford, Oregon (KIFS), have identical playlists because their demographics are similar. Similarly, the top five most-played artists for the week ending October 20, 2002, on Chicago's KISS station (WKSC-FM) included Cam'ron, Eminem, and Justin Timberlake, while the same list at Dallas' KISS station (KHKS) featured Kelly Clarkson, John Mayer, and Creed.

On July 24, 2006, Statesville, North Carolina's heritage country station WFMX was moved to Clemmons, a suburb of Winston-Salem, and flipped to soft R&B as WMKS, the second "Kiss" to feature a soft-R&B format, after then-WKUS in Norfolk, Virginia. WKUS would eventually change formats and move to another frequency, while the former WFMX is today WVBZ (105.7 Man Up). The WMKS call sign had moved to sister frequency 100.3 in High Point in 2014 in a frequency swap that saw the "Kiss" name revived on the stronger of the two signals and with a contemporary hit radio (CHR) format.

On November 17, 2006, Clear Channel announced that the company intended to be sold to a group of private equity firms. Clear Channel announced on the same day its intent to sell off many radio stations in smaller radio markets, including some KISS-FM formatted stations. As of March 2007, KISS-FM branded stations formerly owned by Clear Channel that have retained the KISS brand include WDKS in Evansville, Indiana and KTRS-FM in Casper, Wyoming.

On December 15, 2008, Clear Channel reached an agreement to acquire five CBS Radio stations, one of them being KBKS (106.1 Kiss FM) in Seattle. In return, CBS would acquire two Clear Channel stations in Houston as an effort to expand its focus on the larger markets.

== Conflict and controversy ==
Clear Channel has pursued legal claims against some station owners using branding similar to KISS-FM. Some stations have dropped KISS branding as a result. Examples:

- On May 15, 1999, Radio One station WENZ in Cleveland—acquired in a divestiture from Clear Channel—changed its format from modern rock to mainstream urban, changed its branding to "Kiss 107.9", and intended to change its call letters to reflect the change in format and brand. One week later, Clear Channel flipped recently acquired WZLE in Lorain, Ohio, to CHR as "Kiss 104.9" and issued a cease and desist order against Radio One claiming full rights to the "Kiss" brand in Ohio. Radio One rebranded WENZ as "Z-107.9", a reference to the WENZ call letters, on September 1, 1999, ending the dispute; WZLE itself then changed its call letters to WAKS.
- In 2001, Clear Channel went to federal court to force American General Media (AGM) to give up the "Kiss" slogan that was used as the on-air moniker for Rhythmic Top 40 station KISV in Bakersfield, California. Clear Channel wanted to use the slogan for its then-recent acquisition KKXX in 2000. AGM argued they had the rights to the "Kiss" slogan three years before Clear Channel came to Bakersfield; Clear Channel said otherwise and claimed AGM used it without permission.

== List of "KISS-FM" stations ==
iHeartMedia, Inc./Clear Channel Owned "KISS FM" branded Stations
Callsign	Frequency	Band	City	State	Format
WQRV-HD2*	100.3-2	FM	Huntsville	Alabama	CHR
W293AH	106.5	FM	Huntsville	Alabama	WQRV-HD2 relay
WRKH-HD2*	96.1-2	FM	Mobile	Alabama	CHR
W258AY	99.5	FM	Mobile	Alabama	WRKH-HD2 relay
KZZP	104.7	FM	Phoenix	Arizona	CHR
KSSN	95.7	FM	Little Rock	Arkansas	Country
KVVS**	105.5	FM	Lancaster	California	CHR
KIIS-FM	102.7	FM	Los Angeles	California	CHR
KZIS	107.9	FM	Sacramento	California	Hot AC
KSME	96.1	FM	Fort Collins	Colorado	CHR
WKSS	95.7	FM	Hartford	Connecticut	CHR
WKSL	97.9	FM	Jacksonville	Florida	CHR
WFKS	95.1	FM	Melbourne	Florida	CHR
WSDV	1450	AM	Sarasota	Florida	Hot AC
W280EV	103.9	FM	Sarasota	Florida	WSDV relay
WGMY	107.1	FM	Tallahassee	Florida	CHR
WKSP	96.3	FM	Augusta	Georgia	Urban AC
WMRZ	98.1	FM	Albany	Georgia	Urban AC
WAEV	97.3	FM	Savannah	Georgia	CHR
WKSC-FM	103.5	FM	Chicago	Illinois	CHR
KKSY-FM	96.5	FM	Cedar Rapids	Iowa	Country
KUUL	101.3	FM	Davenport	Iowa	CHR
KKDM	107.5	FM	Des Moines	Iowa	CHR
KSFT-FM	107.1	FM	Sioux City	Iowa	CHR
WKZP	95.9	FM	Salisbury–Ocean City	Maryland	CHR
WXKS-FM	107.9	FM	Boston	Massachusetts	CHR
KISO	96.1	FM	Omaha	Nebraska	CHR
WKKF-FM	102.3	FM	Ballston Spa	New York	CHR
WPKF	96.1	FM	Poughkeepsie	New York	CHR
WKGS	106.7	FM	Rochester	New York	CHR
WKSF	99.9	FM	Asheville	North Carolina	Country
WAKS	96.5	FM	Akron–Cleveland	Ohio	CHR
WKFS	107.1	FM	Cincinnati	Ohio	Gold based CHR
WBKS	93.9	FM	Lima	Ohio	CHR
WVKS	92.5	FM	Toledo	Ohio	CHR
WKST-FM	96.1	FM	Pittsburgh	Pennsylvania	CHR
WKSB	102.7	FM	Williamsport	Pennsylvania	AC
WEGR	102.7	FM	Memphis	Tennessee	Hot AC
KHFI-FM	96.7	FM	Austin	Texas	CHR
KKMY	104.5	FM	Beaumont	Texas	Rhythmic CHR
KVJM	103.1	FM	Bryan–College Station	Texas	CHR
KHKS	106.1	FM	Dallas–Fort Worth	Texas	CHR
KHKZ/KQXX-FM	105.5/106.3	FM	San Benito–Mission	Texas	Hot AC
WKSI-FM	98.3	FM	Winchester	Virginia	CHR
KISC	98.1	FM	Spokane	Washington	AC
WVKF	95.7	FM	Shadyside, Ohio–Wheeling	West Virginia	CHR

Non-iHeartMedia, Inc./Clear Channel Affiliated "KISS-FM" Stations
Station	Frequency	Owner	Region	Format
KEKS	103.1	MyTown Media	Emporia, Kansas	CHR
KELI	98.7	Townsquare Media	San Angelo, Texas	CHR
KISX	107.3	Townsquare Media	Tyler/Longview, Texas	Urban AC
KKSW	105.9	Great Plains Media	Lawrence/Topeka/Kansas City, Kansas	CHR
KSAS-FM	103.5	Townsquare Media	Boise, Idaho	CHR
KSKS	93.7	Cumulus Media	Fresno, California	Country
KTRS-FM	104.7	Townsquare Media	Casper, Wyoming	CHR
WKSZ/WKZY	95.9/92.9	Woodward Communications, Inc.	Green Bay/Appleton-Oshkosh, Wisconsin	CHR
KCRS-FM	103.3	ICA Broadcasting	Odessa/Midland, Texas	CHR
KSII	93.1	Townsquare Media	El Paso, Texas	Hot AC
KZII-FM	102.5	Townsquare Media	Lubbock, Texas	CHR
KKSS	97.3	American General Media	Santa Fe, New Mexico	Rhythmic CHR
KXNC	104.7	MyTown Media	Ness City, Kansas	CHR
KXSS-FM	96.9	Townsquare Media	Amarillo, Texas	CHR
KISS-FM	99.5	Cox Media Group	San Antonio, Texas	Rock
KISN	96.7	Townsquare Media	Bozeman, Montana	CHR
KSSM	103.1	Townsquare Media	Copperas Cove, Texas	Urban AC
KYIS	98.9	Cumulus Media	Oklahoma City, Oklahoma	Hot AC
WALR-FM	104.1	Cox Media Group	Atlanta, Georgia	Urban AC
WDKS	106.1	Townsquare Media	Evansville, Indiana	CHR
WBHK-FM	98.7	SummitMedia	Birmingham, Alabama	Urban AC
WDMK	105.9	Beasley Broadcast Group	Detroit, Michigan	Urban AC
WKIS	99.9	Audacy, Inc.	Miami, Florida	Country
WKJS/WKJM	99.3/105.7	Urban One	Richmond/Petersburg, Virginia	Urban AC
WKSE	98.5	Audacy, Inc.	Buffalo, New York	CHR
WKSO	97.3	First Natchez Radio Group	Natchez, Mississippi	CHR
WKZA	106.9	MediaOne Radio Group	Jamestown, New York	Oldies
WLXC	103.1	Cumulus Media	Columbia, South Carolina	Urban AC
WPIA/WHPI	98.5/96.5	Advanced Media Partners, LLC	Peoria, Illinois	CHR
WXSS-FM	103.7	Audacy, Inc.	Milwaukee, Wisconsin	CHR
WWFA	102.7	George S. Flinn, Jr.	Florence-Muscle Shoals, Alabama	CHR
WCKS	102.7	Graddick Communications	Carrollton, Georgia	CHR
WXXS	102.3	Radio New England Broadcasting, LLC	St. Johnsbury, Vermont	Hot AC
WYKS	105.3	Gillen Broadcasting Corporation	Gainesville, Florida	CHR
WKXJ	103.7	Audacy, Inc.	Chattanooga, Tennessee	CHR
WSKS/WSKU	97.9/105.5	Roser Communications	Utica, New York	CHR
WDAI	98.5	Cumulus Media	Myrtle Beach, South Carolina	Urban

== Kiss FM in Europe ==
The Kiss FM name has been widely used both by licensed and pirate stations in several European countries including Ireland, the United Kingdom, France, Italy, Poland, Ukraine, Romania, Moldova, Iceland, Greece, Spain, Sweden, Berlin, Germany and The Netherlands. KISSFM Portugal (Licensed) and Broadcasts on 101.2 FM around Portugal as is owned by Global Diffusion.

In the United Kingdom, Kiss, formerly known as Kiss FM, has become one of the biggest radio brands/networks. It started as an illegal station in 1985 but relaunched legally in 1990.

In Greece, KISSFM broadcasts from its home in Athens on DAB, FM and online to the Country and its islands. KISSFM Greece is Greece's only English speaking radio station and launched June 1, 2020.

== Kiss FM in Brazil ==
There is a Kiss FM in São Paulo, Brazil, that plays classic rock. It can be heard at 92.5 MHz. Kiss FM 92.5 (Wikipedia - Portuguese)

== Kiss FM in Canada ==
Kiss
- CHBN-FM logo
- Country: Canada

Programming
- Format: Top 40 (CHR)

Ownership
- Owner: Rogers Sports & Media

History
- Launch date: February 26, 1999

In Canada, Rogers Sports & Media uses the "Kiss" brand for its Top 40 (CHR) stations. CKIZ-FM in Vernon, British Columbia, sold to Jim Pattison Broadcasting Group in 2010, kept the Kiss-FM brand until 2017.

CKIS-FM has historically been Toronto's KISS FM station; however, for several years in the first decade of the millennium, the station instead followed the famous Jack FM adult hits format. The Jack format was dropped in the middle of 2009, and KISS FM has since returned to the station, which carries a Top 40 (CHR) format.

The other Canadian station in a prominent market is CISS-FM in Ottawa. It is better known as "105.3 KiSS FM" and has a hot adult contemporary format. The call sign, CISS, was once used by CKIS-FM before it made the switch to Jack FM in June 2003.

On August 29, 2013, all four "EZ Rock"-branded Hot AC stations owned and operated by Rogers, CJMX-FM Sudbury, CKGB-FM Timmins, CHUR-FM North Bay, and CHAS-FM Sault Ste. Marie, rebranded to Rogers' own "KiSS" branding, discarding the "EZ Rock" branding that is currently owned by competing broadcaster Bell Media.

On September 12, 2013, Rogers switched WLYK, a radio station targeting Kingston, Ontario, from Adult Contemporary into a Top 40 station and rebranded it from "102.7 The Lake" to "KiSS 102.7". In 2023, WLYK dropped the "Kiss" branding.

On December 26, 2013, Rogers flip CHFM-FM, a radio station in Calgary, from Adult Contemporary into a Top 40 station and rebranded it from "Lite 95.9" to "KiSS 95.9".

On February 13, 2015, Rogers re-branded 102.3 Clear FM in Winnipeg, Manitoba as "KiSS 102.3", without any change in format or personnel. The re-branding aligns CKY with other KiSS-branded Hot AC stations operated by Rogers.

On February 23, 2015, Rogers re-branded SONiC Nation in Chilliwack, British Columbia/Abbotsford, British Columbia/Vancouver, British Columbia as "KiSS RADiO", without any change in format or personnel. The re-branding aligns CKKS-FM with other KiSS-branded Hot AC stations operated by Rogers, in 2022, Roger’s Media re-branded KiSS to SONiC, with a format and personnel change. On June 19, 2025, Rogers rebranded CKKS to KiSS Throwbacks featuring hits from the 90s and 2000s. On September 14, 2026, Rogers returned CKKS back to a CHR format branded as KiSS West Coast.

On February 25, 2015, Rogers re-branded 103.1 Jack FM in Victoria, British Columbia as "KiSS 103.1" from Jack FM Brand, "playing what we want" format into a Top 40. The re-branding aligns CHTT with other KiSS-branded Hot AC stations operated by Rogers.

On September 2, 2016, Rogers re-branded CFRV-FM, 107.7 The River, in Lethbridge, Alberta as "KiSS 107.7" to reflect the stations Hot AC sound.

On February 24, 2017, Rogers re-branded CHBN-FM in Edmonton, Alberta as "KiSS 91.7".

== Kiss FM in Australia ==
Midwest Radio Network introduced the Kiss FM brand into Australia when it launched Kiss FM 95.3 in 1997. The 95.3 frequency was subsequently reclaimed by the Australian broadcasting regulator and auctioned off for $106 million in exchange for allowing Midwest to extend its service area into the Blue Mountains of New South Wales. At that time Kiss FM 95.3 became Kiss 107.9. In 2011 the station's name was changed to Move FM.

The Australian Radio Network (ARN) launched the KIIS brand in Australia in January 2014, after rebranding their failing Sydney station Mix 106.5. ARN, partially owned by Clear Channel at the time, poached top rating breakfast duo Kyle and Jackie O from rival 2Day FM, and launched the new positioning and music format on January 20, 2014. In the first survey following the switch, Kyle & Jackie O added 6 percentage points to the timeslot to become equal first FM breakfast with sister-station 101.7 WSFM.

In November 2014, ARN announced it was rebranding its Melbourne Mix FM station to KIIS 101.1. At the same time, the station announced a new national drive show featuring former Nova 100 breakfast team Dave "Hughesy" Hughes and Kate Langbroek. ARN also rebranded the rest of the Mix Network as the KIIS Network, retaining each station's existing name, but changing the logo to the distinctive KIIS lips.

Kiss FM Australia is a Melbourne-based narrowcast radio station for the dance music community that was established in 2005. It broadcasts on 87.6, 87.8, 87.9 and 88.0 FM to Melbourne, broader Victoria state and Queensland via Orbit FM. It is considered part of the FM 876 Network. When ARN launched the KIIS brand in Australia, they faced a legal challenge from the management of Kiss FM. By February 2015, both parties had reached an agreement to co-exist.
