= CFCH-FM =

Radio station in North Bay, Ontario, Canada

Coordinates: 46°18′10″N 79°24′39″W

- North Bay, Ontario; Canada
- Broadcast area: Nipissing District
- Frequency: 90.5 MHz
- Branding: Country 90.5

Programming
- Format: Country

Ownership
- Owner: Vista Radio
- Sister stations: CFXN-FM

History
- First air date: June 15, 2021

Technical information
- Class: C1
- ERP: 45,800 W
- HAAT: 145.5 metres (477 ft)

Links
- Website: mynorthbaynow.com/on-air/cfch/

CFCH-FM (90.5 FM) is a Canadian radio station in North Bay, Ontario. Owned by Vista Radio, it broadcasts a country format branded as Country 90.5.

== History ==
In September 2018, the CRTC issued a call for applications for a new commercial FM station serving North Bay. Among the applicants was Vista Radio, owner of CFXN-FM, who proposed a station that would carry an oldies format on 90.5 FM, with an effective radiated power of 45,800 watts. On May 25, 2020, the CRTC approved the application by Vista Radio.

In June 2020, Vista announced that it had acquired the heritage callsign CFCH, which once belonged to what is now Rogers-owned CKFX-FM. Vista Radio's owner Sherry Brydson is a granddaughter of CFCH's original owner Roy Thomson, and she described the station as being established in Thomson's legacy. From 2005 to 2014, the CFCH callsign was previously used at an unrelated radio station in Chase, British Columbia.

On June 15, 2021, at 7:15 am ET, CFCH-FM officially launched with a country music format as Country 90.5; its first song was "Outlaws & Outsiders" by North Bay native Cory Marks. Former CHUR-FM morning host Kevin Oschefski joined the new station as its morning host. The new station competes primarily with Rogers' 600 CKAT (which had taken over the original CFCH's AM 600 frequency after it moved to 101.9 FM as CKFX in the 1990s).

The launch of Vista Radio's new Country 90.5 also makes Rogers Media's CKAT the second country radio station in the North Bay market with the similar branding of CKAT's Country 600.
