= Telemedia =

Former Canadian media company

Telemedia Inc.
- Type: Public
- Industry: Media
- Founded: 1968
- Founder: Philippe de Gaspé Beaubien
- Defunct: 2002
- Successors: Standard Broadcasting, Later Astral Media, then Bell Media
- Headquarters: 1 Place Ville Marie, Suite 3333, Montreal, Quebec, Canada
- Key people: Philippe de Gaspé Beaubien, CEO
- Owner: Philippe de Gaspé Beaubien
- Divisions: Radio broadcasting, Magazine publishing

Telemedia was a Canadian media company, which had holdings in radio, television and magazine publishing.

The company was launched in 1968 by Philippe de Gaspé Beaubien, when he purchased CKAC in Montreal from Power Corporation of Canada. CKAC remained the company's radio flagship for its entire existence.

Telemedia was held privately until it became publicly traded in the late 1980s.

Telemedia's magazine assets, including Canadian Living, Harrowsmith, Homemakers and the Canadian editions of TV Guide and Elle, were sold to Transcontinental Media in 2000. Standard Broadcasting subsequently acquired Telemedia's broadcasting assets in 2002, and sold some of them in turn to Rogers Communications and Newcap Broadcasting.

In 2007, Astral Media acquired the rest of Telemedia's Southern Ontario/British Columbia operations through the acquisition of Standard Broadcasting. In 2013, Bell Media acquired Astral Media and the telemedia radio stations. From 2013-2024, Bell Media owned most of the Telemedia Stations, however in 2024 as part of a corporate restructuring, Bell Media sold off a bunch of radio stations to new owners. Today, the ownership of Telemedia stations are scattered everywhere to new owners.

== Stations acquired by Standard ==
Through later transactions, almost all of these stations are now owned by Bell Media.

=== Ontario ===
- Hamilton - CHAM, CKLH, CKOC
- London - CKSL, CJBK, CJBX, CIQM
- Pembroke - CHVR
- St. Catharines - CHRE, CHTZ, CKTB
- Toronto - CHBM, CKFM, CFRB

=== British Columbia ===
- Dawson Creek - CJDC, CJDC-TV
- Fort Nelson - CKRX
- Fort St. John - CKNL, CHRX
- Golden - CKGR
- Kelowna - CKBL, CHSU
- Kitimat - CKTK
- Nelson - CKKC
- Osoyoos - CJOR
- Penticton - CJMG, CKOR
- Prince Rupert - CHTK
- Princeton - CIOR
- Revelstoke - CKCR
- Salmon Arm - CKXR
- Summerland - CHOR
- Terrace - CFTK, CFTK-TV, CJFW
- Trail - CJAT
- Vernon - CICF

=== Alberta ===
- Edmonton - CFMG

== Stations acquired by Rogers ==
All of the stations that were acquired by Rogers are located in Ontario. Two of the stations have since been sold to other companies.

- North Bay - CHUR, CKAT, CKFX
- Sault Ste. Marie - CHAS, CJQM
- Sudbury - CJMX, CJRQ
- Timmins - CJQQ, CKGB
- Toronto - CJCL

=== Former stations ===
Stations formerly owned by Rogers have now since been sold to other companies:

- Sudbury - CIGM
- Orillia - CICX

== Stations acquired by Newcap ==
Although Newcap acquired the majority interest in these stations, all of which are in Alberta, Standard Broadcasting retained a 23.66% share. All are now wholly owned by Newcap.

- Athabasca - CKBA
- Blairmore - CJPR
- Brooks - CIBQ
- Calgary - CIQX ^{1}
- Drumheller - CKDQ
- Edson - CFXE
- Grand Centre - CJCM
- High Prairie - CKVH
- Hinton - CIYR
- St. Paul - CHLW
- Slave Lake - CKWA
- Stettler - CKSQ
- Wainwright - CKKY
- Westlock - CFOK
- Wetaskiwin - CKJR

NOTES: ^{1} Telemedia held the license for this station, which had not yet launched at the time of its acquisition.

== Stations in Quebec and Atlantic/ Stations Acquired by Astral Media ==
All Telemedia stations in Quebec and in the atlantic were acquired by Astral Media, although the Radiomédia network of mainly AM stations became a 50/50 joint venture between Astral Media and Standard Broadcasting. Corus Entertainment acquired Radiomédia by 2005 in exchange for Corus's smaller FM stations in Quebec. Astral re-entered the AM business in Quebec by 2007, when Standard Broadcasting exited the terrestrial broadcasting business as Astral acquired the stations. Today, All of the stations that were Acquired by Astral Media except for Radiomédia are now owned by Bell Media.

=== Atlantic ===
- Bathurst - CKBC-FM
- Fredericton - CFXY-FM, CIBX-FM, CKHJ
- Grand Falls - CIKX-FM
- Woodstock - CJCJ-FM
- Truro - CKTO-FM, CKTY-FM

=== RockDétente ===
- CFIX-FM 96.9, Saguenay
- CHEY-FM 94.7, Trois-Rivières / Mauricie
- CIMF-FM 94.9, Gatineau / Outaouais
- CITE-FM 107.3, Montreal
- CITE-FM-1 102.7, Sherbrooke / Estrie
- CITF-FM 107.5, Quebec City

=== Radiomédia ===
- CKRS 590, Saguenay
- CHLN 550, Trois-Rivières / Mauricie
- CJRC 1150, Gatineau / Outaouais
- CKAC 730, Montreal
- CHLT 630, Sherbrooke / Estrie
- CHRC 800, Quebec City

=== English Radio Station ===
- CKTS 900, Sherbrooke
