= Rogers Radio =

Canadian radio broadcasting company

- Type: Division
- Industry: Broadcasting
- Founded: 1960; 66 years ago
- Founder: Edward S. Rogers Jr.
- Headquarters: 1 Mount Pleasant Road, Toronto, Ontario, Canada
- Area served: Canada
- Services: Radio broadcasting
- Parent: Rogers Sports & Media
- Website: www.rogerssportsandmedia.com/radio/

Rogers Radio is the radio broadcasting division of Rogers Sports & Media, a subsidiary of Rogers Communications. The division operates commercial radio stations in Alberta, British Columbia, Manitoba, Nova Scotia and Ontario, as well as associated digital audio and podcast properties.

Rogers' radio business traces its origins to Ted Rogers' acquisition of Toronto FM station CHFI-FM in 1960. As of July 2026, following a series of station closures and divestitures, Rogers said it continued to own and operate 44 radio stations in nearly 30 communities across Canada.

Rogers Radio operates stations under brands including Jack FM, KiSS, Sportsnet Radio, NewsRadio, Country, Rock, SONiC and Mountain FM, along with local station brands.

== History ==
Rogers' radio operations began with Ted Rogers' purchase of CHFI-FM in Toronto in 1960. The company later expanded through acquisitions of radio stations and station groups across Canada.

In October 2023, Rogers discontinued its CityNews radio service in Ottawa and returned the licence for CIWW to the Canadian Radio-television and Telecommunications Commission (CRTC). In 2025, the CRTC approved the sale of CKOT-FM and CJDL-FM in Tillsonburg and CJET-FM in Smiths Falls to My Broadcasting Corporation.

On July 7, 2026, Rogers Sports & Media announced that it was cutting 230 positions and closing six radio stations: CKWX and CISL in Vancouver, CFFR and CFAC in Calgary, CJNI-FM in Halifax and CKGL in Kitchener. The company attributed the closures to declining audience and revenue trends and said the affected licences would be returned to the CRTC. Rogers said radio production of Vancouver Canucks games would move to another Rogers-owned station in Vancouver, while the company would stop producing Calgary Flames radio broadcasts.

== List of stations ==
=== Current stations ===
City	Call Sign	Frequency	Band	Branding	Format
Abbotsford	CKQC-FM	107.1	FM	107.1 Country	Country
Abbotsford	CKKS-FM-1	92.5	FM	KiSS West Coast	Hot Adult Contemporary
Banff	CHFM-FM-1	99.3	FM	Star 95.9	Adult Contemporary
Banff	CJAQ-FM-1	94.1	FM	Jack 96.9	Adult Hits
Banff	CHMN-FM-1	106.5	FM	106.5 Mountain FM	Adult Contemporary
Calgary	CHFM-FM	95.9	FM	Star 95.9	Adult Contemporary
Calgary	CJAQ-FM	96.9	FM	Jack 96.9	Adult Hits
Canmore	CHMN-FM	106.5	FM	106.5 Mountain FM	Adult Contemporary
Chilliwack	CKKS-FM	107.5	FM	KiSS West Coast	Hot Adult Contemporary
Chilliwack	CKSR-FM	98.3	FM	Star 98.3	Adult Contemporary
Edmonton	CHBN-FM	91.7	FM	KiSS 91.7	Hot Adult Contemporary
Edmonton	CHDI-FM	102.9	FM	SONiC 102.9	Alternative Rock
Egmont	CIEG-FM	107.5	FM	107.5 Mountain FM	Adult Contemporary
Fort McMurray	CKYX-FM	97.9	FM	97.9 Rock	Rock
Fort McMurray	CJOK-FM	93.3	FM	93.3 Country	Country
Gibsons	CISC-FM	107.5	FM	107.5 Mountain FM	Adult Contemporary
Grande Prairie	CFGP-FM	97.7	FM	97.7 Rock	Rock
Invermere	CJAQ-FM-2	98.3	FM	Jack 96.9	Adult Hits
Halifax	CFLT-FM	92.9	FM	Jack 92.9	Adult Hits
Kingston	CIKR-FM	105.7	FM	K Rock 105.7	Rock
Kingston	CKXC-FM	93.5	FM	93.5 Country	Country
Kitchener	CHYM-FM	96.7	FM	CHYM 96.7	Adult Contemporary
Kitchener	CIKZ-FM	106.7	FM	106.7 Country	Country
Lethbridge	CFRV-FM	107.7	FM	KiSS 107.7	Hot Adult Contemporary
Lethbridge	CJRX-FM	106.7	FM	106.7 Rock	Rock
London	CHST-FM	102.3	FM	Jack 102.3	Adult Hits
Medicine Hat	CKMH-FM	105.3	FM	105.3 Rock	Rock
Medicine Hat	CJCY-FM	102.1	FM	Jack 102.1	Adult Hits
North Bay	CHUR-FM	100.5	FM	KiSS 100.5	Hot Adult Contemporary
North Bay	CKAT	600	AM	600 Country	Country
North Bay	CKFX-FM	101.9	FM	101.9 The Fox	Rock
Ottawa	CHEZ-FM	106	FM	CHEZ 106	Rock
Ottawa	CISS-FM	105.3	FM	KiSS 105.3	Hot Adult Contemporary
Pemberton	CISP-FM	104.5	FM	104.5 Mountain FM	Adult Contemporary
Pender Harbour	CIPN-FM	104.7	FM	104.7 Mountain FM	Adult Contemporary
Sault Ste. Marie	CHAS-FM	100.5	FM	KiSS 100.5	Hot Adult Contemporary
Sault Ste. Marie	CJQM-FM	104.3	FM	104.3 Country	Country
Sechelt	CFUN-FM	104.7	FM	104.7 Mountain FM	Adult Contemporary
Smiths Falls	CKBY-FM	101.1	FM	101.1 Country	Country
Squamish	CISQ-FM	107.1	FM	107.1 Mountain FM	Adult Contemporary
Sudbury	CJRQ-FM	92.7	FM	Q92	Rock
Sudbury	CJMX-FM	105.3	FM	KiSS 105.3	Hot Adult Contemporary
Timmins	CJQQ-FM	92.1	FM	Q92	Rock
Timmins	CKGB-FM	99.3	FM	KiSS 99.3	Hot Adult Contemporary
Toronto	CFTR	680	AM	680 NewsRadio Toronto	News
Toronto	CHFI-FM	98.1 HD1	FM	98.1 CHFI	Adult Contemporary
Toronto	CKIS-FM	92.5	FM	KiSS 92.5	Hot Adult Contemporary
Toronto	CJCL	590	AM	Sportsnet 590 The Fan	Sports
Vancouver	CJAX-FM	96.9	FM	Jack 96.9	Adult Hits
Vancouver	CKKS-FM-2	104.9	FM	KiSS West Coast	Hot Adult Contemporary
Victoria	CHTT-FM	103.1	FM	Jack 103.1	Adult Hits
Victoria	CIOC-FM	98.5	FM	Ocean 98.5	Adult Contemporary
Whistler	CISW-FM	102.1	FM	102.1 Mountain FM	Adult Contemporary
Winnipeg	CITI-FM	92.1	FM	92.1 CITI	Rock
Winnipeg	CKY-FM	102.3	FM	KiSS 102.3	Hot Adult Contemporary
Source: Seekr

=== Former stations ===
City of licence	Call sign	Frequency	Band	Years owned	Fate
Calgary	CFFR	660	AM	1999–2026	Ceased operations; licence to be returned to the CRTC.
Calgary	CFAC	960	AM	1989–2026	Ceased operations; licence to be returned to the CRTC.
Cape Vincent, New York	WLYK	102.7	FM	2008–2023	Rogers owned a 20% interest in the American border station serving the Kingston, Ontario market and managed the station until the interest was sold to principals of My Broadcasting Corporation.
Edmonton	CKER-FM	107.7	FM	2006–2020	Sold to Akash Broadcasting Inc.
Halifax, Nova Scotia	CJNI-FM	95.7	FM	2005–2026	Ceased operations; licence to be returned to the CRTC.
Kitchener, Ontario	CKGL	570	AM	1994–2026	Ceased operations; licence to be returned to the CRTC.
Moncton	CKNI-FM	91.9	FM	2004–2014	Sold to Acadia Broadcasting.
Ottawa	CIWW	1310	AM	1994–2023	Ceased operations; licence revoked at Rogers' request.
Saint John	CHNI-FM	88.9	FM	2004–2013	Sold to Newcap Radio.
Sault Ste. Marie	CIRS	530	AM	2002–2010	Low-power tourist information station; went dark in 2010.
Orillia, Ontario	CICX-FM	105.9	FM	2002–2007	Sold to Larche Communications; later acquired by Bell Media.
Smiths Falls	CJET-FM	92.3	FM	1999–2025	Sold to My Broadcasting Corporation.
Tillsonburg, Ontario	CKOT-FM	101.3	FM	2016–2025	Sold to My Broadcasting Corporation.
Tillsonburg, Ontario	CJDL-FM	107.3	FM	2016–2025	Sold to My Broadcasting Corporation.
Vancouver	CKWX	1130	AM	1988–2026	Ceased operations; licence to be returned to the CRTC.
Vancouver	CISL	650	AM	2017–2026	Ceased operations; licence to be returned to the CRTC.
