= CJCY-FM =

Radio station in Medicine Hat

Coordinates: 50°02′46″N 110°37′08″W

- Medicine Hat, Alberta; Canada
- Frequency: 102.1 MHz
- Branding: Jack 102.1

Programming
- Format: Adult hits

Ownership
- Owner: Rogers Radio
- Sister stations: CKMH-FM

History
- First air date: May 23, 2008

Technical information
- Class: B
- ERP: 17,000 watts vertical 40,000 watts horizontal
- HAAT: 77.5 meters (254 ft)

Links
- Website: jack1021.com

CJCY-FM (102.1 MHz, Jack 102.1) is a radio station in Medicine Hat, Alberta. Owned by Rogers Radio, a division of Rogers Sports & Media, it broadcasts an adult hits format under the "Jack" branding.

== History ==
Former logo as Classic Hits 102.1 CJCY

The station was licensed by the Canadian Radio-television and Telecommunications Commission in 2007, and officially launched on May 23, 2008.

The CJCY callsign was once used by another radio station in Medicine Hat, now called CFMY, from 1982 to 1998. That station has no ownership association with the current CJCY.

In January 2018, the station announced its sale to Rogers Media. The sale to Rogers was approved in early summer of 2018, and CJCY transitioned to Rogers, including moving into the Rogers building, in August of that year.

In January 2021, the station flipped to adult hits using Rogers' standard "Jack" branding.
