= CJQQ-FM =

Radio station in Timmins, Ontario

Coordinates: 48°28′12″N 81°17′49″W

- Timmins, Ontario; Canada
- Frequency: 92.1 MHz
- Branding: Q92

Programming
- Format: Mainstream rock

Ownership
- Owner: Rogers Media; (Rogers Media, Inc.)
- Sister stations: CKGB-FM

History
- First air date: 1948
- Former call signs: CKGB-FM (1948–1976); CFTI-FM (1976–1992)
- Call sign meaning: "Q" (current branding)

Technical information
- Class: C
- ERP: 40,000 watts horizontal polarization only
- HAAT: 162 metres (531 ft)

Links
- Website: www.q92timmins.com

CJQQ-FM is a Canadian radio station, broadcasting at 92.1 FM in Timmins, Ontario. The station broadcasts a mainstream rock format as Q92.

== History ==
The station was originally launched in 1948 by Roy Thomson as CKGB-FM, a simulcast of AM sister station CKGB's CBC Trans-Canada Network programming. Thomson sold the stations in 1972, and the FM station adopted the callsign CFTI-FM in 1976. The stations were subsequently acquired by Telemedia in 1980.

In 1984, CFTI was authorized to drop its CBC Radio affiliation as network service was now available in the area from CBC-owned CBCJ-FM.

In 1992, Telemedia adopted the station's branding (as Q92), callsign CJQQ and format, which had been successful on Telemedia's CJRQ in Sudbury.

In 2002, Standard Broadcasting purchased Telemedia, and sold all of Telemedia's Northern Ontario stations to Rogers Media.

On June 7, 2016, CJQQ-FM rebranded the station as 92.1 Rock. The station uses the same general format as, and shares some programming with, CJRQ-FM in Sudbury and CKFX-FM in North Bay. The stations currently air a mixture of locally-hosted dayparts with syndicated programming, including the Brock & Dalby morning show from CIKR-FM Kingston, and the internationally syndicated Greg Beharrell Show in the evenings.

On June 28, 2024, Rogers dropped the 92.1 Rock branding and resurrected the original 1990s Q92 branding. Rogers had also resurrected the original 1990s brandings for CJRQ-FM Sudbury (as Q92) and CKFX-FM North Bay (as 101.9 The Fox).
