= CKSO-FM =

Former radio station in Sudbury, Ontario

- Sudbury, Ontario; Canada
- Frequency: 101.1 MHz

Programming
- Format: Christian music

Ownership
- Owner: David Jackson

History
- First air date: 2002
- Last air date: 2006

Technical information
- Class: LP
- ERP: 50,000 watts

CKSO-FM was a Christian music station, which broadcast at 101.1 FM in Sudbury, Ontario in the mid-2000s.

On January 26, 2001, David Jackson (OBCI) applied to operate a new English language Christian music FM radio station in Sudbury. The new station would operate at 94.3 MHz (channel 232LP) with an effective radiated power of 50 watts. The frequency was later changed to 101.1 MHz (channel 266LP)

On September 5, 2001, a group led by David Jackson was given approval to operate a new Christian music FM radio station at 101.1 FM. According to an interview with the community newspaper Northern Life, Jackson chose the CKSO call letters because of their historical significance in the Sudbury area; in addition to CIGM-FM, which was known as CKSO-FM from 1965 to 1977, the call letters were also once used by an AM radio station (now CJRQ) and a television station (now CICI) in the city.

On October 8, 2002, the group asked for and was granted an extension to the deadline to commence operations. The station began airing test transmissions on December 2, 2002.

Undated, CKSO-FM was branded as 101.1 The Rock.

Although the station's website remained operational until early 2009, the Canadian Communications Foundation website reports that the station left the air in 2006. The licence, when issued, was to expire on August 31, 2008 — as of that date, however, no renewal application had been filed with the CRTC, and Jackson has not filed an application for a new license as of 2015. The radio station never relaunched.
