= CKMH-FM =

Radio station in Medicine Hat, Alberta

- Medicine Hat, Alberta; Canada
- Frequency: 105.3 MHz
- Branding: 105.3 Rock

Programming
- Format: Classic rock

Ownership
- Owner: Rogers Radio; (Rogers Media, Inc.)
- Sister stations: CJCY-FM

History
- First air date: February 25, 2008
- Call sign meaning: Canada Knows Medicine Hat

Technical information
- Class: C1
- ERP: 100,000 watts
- Transmitter coordinates: 49.997°N 110.644°W

Links
- Website: 1053rock.ca

CKMH-FM (105.3 MHz) is a Canadian radio station that broadcasts a classic rock format in Medicine Hat, Alberta. The station is branded as 105.3 Rock and is currently owned by Rogers Radio, a division of Rogers Sports & Media.

The station was licensed by the Canadian Radio-television and Telecommunications Commission in 2007. After beginning on-air testing on January 29, 2008, CKMH signed on February 25, 2008 at 1:05 PM.
