= CJRQ-FM =

Radio station in Sudbury, Ontario

Coordinates: 46°30′03″N 81°01′12″W

- Sudbury, Ontario; Canada
- Broadcast area: Greater Sudbury
- Frequency: 92.7 MHz
- Branding: Q92

Programming
- Format: Mainstream rock

Ownership
- Owner: Rogers Radio; (Rogers Media, Inc.)
- Sister stations: CJMX-FM

History
- First air date: 1935
- Former call signs: CKSO (1935–1990)
- Former frequencies: 780 kHz (1935–1941); 790 kHz (1941–1990)
- Call sign meaning: "Rock Q" (current branding)

Technical information
- Class: C
- ERP: 100,000 watts
- HAAT: 285 metres (935 ft)

Links
- Website: www.q92sudbury.com

CJRQ-FM (92.7 MHz) is a Canadian radio station, which broadcasts in Sudbury, Ontario. The station uses the on-air brand Q92. The station airs a mainstream rock format and is owned by Rogers Radio, a division of Rogers Sports & Media.

The station first aired as CJRQ-FM in 1990. From 1935 to 1990, it was an AM station, airing under the call letters CKSO.

== History ==
=== CKSO ===
The station was launched in 1935 under the ownership of W. E. Mason, the owner and publisher of the Sudbury Star. CKSO's original frequency was at 780 kHz, until it moved to 790 kHz in 1941. For much of its history, the station was an affiliate of the CBC's Trans-Canada Network. CKSO was the first commercial radio station in northern Ontario.

Following Mason's death in 1948, ownership was passed to a charitable foundation set up by his estate, with the Sudbury Memorial Hospital as the primary beneficiary. The station was acquired by Sudbury businessmen George Miller, Jim Cooper and Bill Plaunt in 1950; the same trio subsequently launched CKSO-TV, the city's first television station, in 1953.

In 1976, 790 CKSO received approval to increase their power from 10,000 watts day and 5,000 watts night to 50,000 watts full-time. Following the power increase, the station's AM signal could be heard as far away as Europe and some areas of the United States during the nighttime hours.

CKSO disaffiliated from CBC Radio in 1978 after CBCS-FM signed on.

CKSO and sister station CIGM were by this time owned by Cambrian Broadcasting, who sold them to United Broadcasting in 1979 as part of the corporate restructuring that created Mid-Canada Communications as the new holder of the CKSO-TV license.

In 1986, United sold CKSO and CIGM to Telemedia.

In the 1980s, the station aired an adult contemporary format, distinguishing itself from competitor CHNO's more youth-oriented Top 40/CHR format. During this era, the station used brandings such as Radio 79 CKSO, Music Radio CKSO and Favourite Hits AM 790.

=== Conversion to CJRQ-FM ===
On March 16, 1990, the CRTC approved Telemedia Communications Ontario Inc.'s application to amend the Promise of Performance for CIGM-FM by changing the music format from Group III (Country and Country-Oriented) to Group IV (40% Pop and Rock-Softer; 60% Pop and Rock-Harder). Two months later on May 18, 1990, CKSO and CIGM swapped frequencies. CIGM moved to CKSO's 790 slot on the AM band, and CKSO took on the new call letters CJRQ and CIGM's 92.7 FM frequency. The new rock format signed on as Q92.

After the 1990 swap, the CKSO call sign no longer existed in the Sudbury area until CKSO-FM, a Christian music station which had no ownership affiliation with CJRQ, signed on in 2003.

While CKSO had been a perennial second in the radio ratings against CHNO, CJRQ quickly became the most-listened to radio station in Northern Ontario, and retained that status until the late 1990s, when CJMX's adult contemporary format overtook CJRQ in the ratings. The station took its biggest ratings hit after CHNO converted to the FM band in 2000, dropping to 22.9 per cent of the radio audience in 2000 from 30.9 per cent in 1999.

In 1997, the station was censured by the Canadian Broadcast Standards Council over a 1995 broadcast. The station aired a daily programming feature in which it asked a daily poll question on an issue in the news, and subsequently broadcast a selection of listener comments; the CBSC complaint pertained to a question about whether the Ontario Health Insurance Plan should cover sex-reassignment surgery for transgender residents of the province, and one listener comment that was broadcast was singled out as especially homophobic and transphobic.

In 1999, Telemedia acquired CJMX from the Pelmorex Radio Network as well. In 2002, Telemedia was purchased by Standard Broadcasting. Shortly afterward, Standard sold CJRQ, CIGM and CJMX to Rogers Communications.

In 2009, CJRQ's longtime sister station AM 790 CIGM was sold to Newcap Broadcasting and moved to the FM dial in August that same year.

On June 7, 2016, Q92 was rebranded as 92.7 Rock retaining the slogan and rock format. This was the first time CJRQ rebranded since the station signed on as "Q92" on May 18, 1990.

The station uses the same general format as, and shares some programming with, CKFX-FM in North Bay and CJQQ-FM in Timmins. The stations currently air a mixture of locally hosted dayparts with syndicated programming, including the Brock & Dalby morning show from CIKR-FM Kingston, and the internationally syndicated Greg Beharrell Show in the evenings.

On June 28, 2024, Rogers dropped the 92.7 Rock branding and resurrected the original 1990s Q92 branding. Rogers had also resurrected the original 1990s brandings for CJQQ-FM Timmins (as Q92) and CKFX-FM North Bay (as 101.9 The Fox).

== Former logos ==
Q92 logo from 1990's-2016

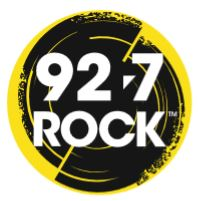
92.7 Rock logo 2016–2024

== Notes ==
C.K.S.O. Road near McFarlane Lake off Highway 69, was named after the radio station, CKSO, as the station's transmitter was formerly located on that road.

In 2004, Doug McCann a former broadcaster at CKSO created a website, and later a Facebook page to keep in touch with the people he worked with at CKSO and providing historical information on the station. In 2021, McCann also published a book about The Story of the Birth of Broadcasting in Sudbury.
