= CKGB-FM =

Radio station in Timmins, Ontario

Coordinates: 48°28′12″N 81°17′49″W

- Timmins, Ontario; Canada
- Broadcast area: Timmins
- Frequency: 99.3 MHz
- Branding: KiSS 99.3

Programming
- Format: Hot adult contemporary

Ownership
- Owner: Rogers Radio; (Rogers Media, Inc.)
- Sister stations: CJQQ-FM

History
- First air date: August 15, 1933
- Former frequencies: 1420 kHz (1933–1939); 1440 kHz (1939-1941); 1470 kHz (1941); 680 kHz (1941–1984); 750 kHz (1984–2001)
- Call sign meaning: "Gold Belt"

Technical information
- Class: C
- ERP: 40,000 watts horizontal polarization only
- HAAT: 162 metres (531 ft)

Links
- Website: kisstimmins.com

CKGB-FM (99.3 MHz) is a Canadian radio station that broadcasts a hot adult contemporary format in Timmins, Ontario. The station uses the on-air brand KiSS 99.3 and is owned by Rogers Radio, a division of Rogers Sports & Media.

== History ==
The station was launched in late 1933 by young Northern Ontario media entrepreneur Roy Thomson, who would later become the owner of The Times of London. Thomson acquired the Timmins Daily Press in 1934, and the newspaper and radio station shared a building and ownership for many years. In the 1940s and 1950s, CKGB was operating on 94.5 FM as CKRT-FM, until it was shut down. The station broadcast on AM from its inception, periodically changing frequencies until its last AM home at 750 in 1984, and adopting a country format in 1990. Coincidentally, Thompson hired Jack Kent Cooke to be a sales rep in the hungry 1930s. He went on to own the Los Angeles Kings hockey franchise. The station was an affiliate of CBC Radio's Trans-Canada Network until 1962 and then the CBC Radio network. In 1984, CKGB was authorized to drop its CBC affiliation as network service was now available in the area from CBC-owned CBCJ-FM.

In 2001, the station received CRTC approval to move to the FM dial, retaining its legendary call letters as CKGB-FM but taking on the "EZ Rock" brand and adult contemporary format, giving the small Timmins radio market its first direct competition, as the Haliburton Broadcasting Group-owned CHMT-FM had launched as AC/CHR hybrid just a few months before. Less than a year after EZ Rock's Timmins launch, CHMT flipped to fill the void in country radio as Moose FM.

In July 2011, the station altered its musical format to present a more contemporary version of its AC Mainstream Plus blend. With this shift, the station cancelled The '80s Lunch program and Sunday at the '70s Solid Gold Saturday Night was replaced by The Saturday Night Show, a program featuring music from the 1970s to present. Scott Turnbull remains as host. The station also adopted a new logo as well as the positioning statement, "Today's Best Music".

CKGB was one of four EZ Rock-branded stations owned and operated by Rogers Media, all of which are located in Northern Ontario (the others being CJMX-FM Sudbury, CHUR-FM North Bay, and CHAS-FM Sault Ste. Marie); as of July 2013, Rogers is in the process of rebranding all 4 stations, and is entertaining listener input through surveys on the stations' websites and through social media. On August 29, 2013, all "EZ Rock" stations rebranded to "Kiss", discarding the "EZ Rock" branding now owned by Bell Media.

In 2020, CKGB changed its moniker to "The New KiSS 99.3", but kept the same slogan and format. The station began carrying the Roz and Mocha Show from CKIS-FM Toronto which also airs on other Rogers-owned "Kiss" stations across Canada.

== Contributions to Canadian Music ==
Canadian country musician Stompin' Tom Connors recorded his first 45-RPM singles at the CKGB radio station in the mid-1960s. They were pressed by Quality Records in Toronto, and paid for (and sold) by Tom personally. Each of these singles features the CKGB logo.

== Logos ==
EZ Rock Timmins logo used from 2001-2011.
