= CISQ-FM =

Radio station in Squamish–Whistler, British Columbia

- Squamish, British Columbia; Canada
- Broadcast area: Squamish, Whistler, Pemberton, Sunshine Coast
- Frequency: 107.1 MHz
- Branding: Mountain FM

Programming
- Format: Adult contemporary

Ownership
- Owner: Rogers Radio; (Rogers Media, Inc.)

History
- First air date: November 30, 1981
- Former frequencies: 104.9 MHz (1982–1987); 98.3 MHz (1987); 104.7 MHz (1987–1988)
- Call sign meaning: SQ for Squamish

Technical information
- Class: B
- ERP: 30,000 watts
- HAAT: -533.6 m
- Transmitter coordinates: 49°42′30″N 123°08′04″W
- Repeaters: CISW-FM 102.1 Whistler; CISP-FM 104.5 Pemberton; CIPN-FM 104.7 Pender Harbour; CFUN-FM 104.7 Sechelt; CISC-FM 107.5 Gibsons; CIEG-FM 107.5 Egmont

Links
- Webcast: Listen Live
- Website: mountainfm.com

CISQ-FM (107.1 MHz) is a radio station owned by Rogers Radio, a division of Rogers Sports & Media, and operating in southwestern British Columbia. It broadcasts at 107.1 MHz in Squamish and 102.1 MHz in Whistler. It broadcasts an adult contemporary format branded as Mountain FM.

== History ==
The station was founded in 1981 by Mountain Broadcasting, which was sold to Selkirk Communications in January 1989. Selkirk, in turn, was sold to Maclean-Hunter in September 1989, and CISQ was resold to Rogers Communications as part of the purchase. The station was relaunched with an adult contemporary format on August 29, 2003. The format was later changed again in 2010.

CISQ-FM has gone through a number of frequency changes. Since the launch in 1982, the station originally began broadcasting at 104.9 FM. In 1987, CISQ moved from 104.9 to 98.3 FM and to 104.7 FM the same year. In 1988, CISQ settled to its current frequency at 107.1 FM.

== Rebroadcasters ==
Rebroadcasters of CISQ-FM
City of licence	Identifier	Frequency	Power	Class	RECNet	CRTC Decision
Whistler	CISW-FM	102.1 FM	1000 watts	A	Query	
Pemberton	CISP-FM	104.5 FM	400 watts	A	Query	
Pender Harbour	CIPN-FM	104.7 FM	350 watts		Query	84-76687-329
Sechelt	CFUN-FM	104.7 FM	350 watts	A	Query	84-76585-814
Gibsons	CISC-FM	107.5 FM	4600 watts	B	Query	
Egmont	CIEG-FM	107.5 FM	50 watts		Query	86-85

On May 22, 2013, the CRTC approved Rogers' application to relocate CISW-FM Whistler from its current location to a CBC-owned tower in Whistler. This relocation will result in a decrease in the average effective radiated power (ERP) from 586 to 474 watts (directional antenna with a decrease in the maximum ERP from 1,430 to 1,000 watts) as well as an increase in the effective height of antenna above average terrain from -306.2 metres to -238.3 metres.

In August 2014, CIEG-FM in Egmont was renamed to CKLG-FM in order to rename the call sign of a Rogers-owned station in Vancouver. Then in March 2015, Rogers switched the call sign of CKKS-FM in Sechelt to CFUN-FM for a Rogers-owned station serving Metro Vancouver and the Fraser Valley.
