= CHUR-FM =

Radio station in North Bay, Ontario

Coordinates: 46°18′10″N 79°24′39″W

- North Bay, Ontario; Canada
- Broadcast area: Nipissing District
- Frequency: 100.5 MHz
- Branding: KiSS 100.5

Programming
- Format: Hot adult contemporary

Ownership
- Owner: Rogers Radio; (Rogers Media, Inc.)
- Sister stations: CKAT, CKFX-FM

History
- First air date: 1984
- Former frequencies: 1110 kHz (1984–1985); 840 kHz (1985–1996)

Technical information
- Class: C1
- ERP: 100,000 watts
- HAAT: 145.5 metres (477 ft)

Links
- Website: kissnorthbay.com

CHUR-FM (100.5 MHz) is a Canadian radio station, which broadcasts a hot adult contemporary format in North Bay, Ontario. The station uses the on-air brand KiSS 100.5.

== History ==
The station was launched in 1984 by Gateway City Broadcasting, at 1110 AM. It was subsequently acquired in 1985 by Mid-Canada Radio, who also changed the station's frequency to 840 AM. In 1990, the station was acquired by the Pelmorex Radio Network.

During the 1980s, CHUR was a AC/Top 40 music station, until it went oldies as Oldies 840 on September 4, 1992, and adult contemporary Mix 840 in March 1994.

In 1994, Pelmorex received CRTC approval to convert CHUR from the AM band to the FM band at 100.5 MHz; converted the station to FM on February 2, 1996; and sold it to Telemedia in 1999. Under Telemedia's ownership, the station dropped the hot ac Mix 100 branding and adopted the "EZ Rock" brand.

In 2002, Telemedia was acquired by Standard Broadcasting, and CHUR was one of the stations sold by Standard to Rogers Radio.

In July 2010, the station altered its musical format to present a more contemporary version of its AC Mainstream Plus blend more in line with the Hot AC version of American Top 40 with Ryan Seacrest. With this shift, the station cancelled The 80's Lunch program and Sunday at the 70's. Solid Gold Saturday Night was replaced by AT40. In July 2011, the station adopted a new logo as well as the slogan "Today's Best Music".

By January 2012, more hot adult contemporary and rhythmic contemporary hits were added to the playlist. The station also unveiled the HitStorm countdown, based out of Toronto's CKIS-FM. In March 2012, all of the Rogers-owned "EZ Rock" stations in Northern Ontario started to air the Top 20 Most Wanted, a countdown show produced by CJMX-FM in Sudbury. By June 2012, the station dropped the entire 1980s library and most pre-2000 music from its playlist, making it one of the few AC stations to not follow the adult contemporary pattern.

CHUR was one of four EZ Rock-branded stations owned and operated by Rogers Media, all of which are located in Northern Ontario (the others being CJMX-FM Sudbury, CHAS-FM Sault Ste. Marie, and CKGB-FM Timmins). On August 29, 2013, all four "EZ Rock" stations rebranded to "Kiss", discarding the "EZ Rock" branding now owned by Bell Media Radio.

In 2020, CHUR changed its moniker to "The New KiSS 100.5", but kept the same slogan and format. The station began carrying the Roz and Mocha Show from CKIS-FM Toronto which also airs on other Rogers-owned "Kiss" stations across Canada.
