= CIKR-FM =

Radio station in Kingston, Ontario

Coordinates: 44°10′02″N 76°25′39″W

- Kingston, Ontario; Canada
- Broadcast area: Eastern Ontario
- Frequency: 105.7 MHz
- Branding: K-Rock 105.7

Programming
- Format: Active rock

Ownership
- Owner: Rogers Radio; (Rogers Media, Inc.)
- Sister stations: CKXC-FM

History
- First air date: March 19, 2001
- Call sign meaning: Canadian Independent Kingston-Rock

Technical information
- Class: C1
- ERP: 24,000 watts (average ERP); 50,000 watts (peak ERP)
- HAAT: 247.9 metres (813 ft)

Links
- Website: krock1057.ca

CIKR-FM (105.7 MHz) is a Canadian radio station in Kingston, Ontario owned by Rogers Radio, a division of Rogers Sports & Media. The station broadcasts an active rock format branded as K-Rock 105.7.

== History ==
Former logo until 2024

The station was originally owned by K-Rock 105.7 Inc., consisting of John P. Wright (60%), Douglas Kirk (15%), and Rogers Radio (25%). The same ownership group also launched CKXC-FM in early 2008, and formerly operated WLYK in the nearby American community of Cape Vincent, New York through a local marketing agreement.

On September 21, 2000, the partnership received approval from the CRTC to operate a new English-language FM radio programming undertaking at Kingston. The station was launched at 4 p.m. on March 19, 2001, by Wright, formerly the general manager of competing stations CKLC and CFLY. It was the first new radio station to be launched in Kingston since 1953. The first song played on "K-Rock" was "Courage" by The Tragically Hip.

On February 6, 2008, K-Rock purchased the naming rights to the K-Rock Centre for 10 years at $3.3 million.

In late November 2008, Rogers announced it would acquire the remainder of the K-Rock partnership, pending CRTC approval. Its application was approved by the CRTC on May 4, 2009.

On May 31, 2010, former morning show host and program director Glenn "G" Williams died after a two-year battle with ALS at age 42.

In June 2012, popular radio hosts Humble & Fred joined the station to fill-in as hosts of the morning show for the summer. In February 2013, long-time K-Rock announcer "Big" Kris Bawden (now heard on CHEZ-FM in Ottawa) returned to the station to host the morning show with co-host Boomer.

The station's regular playlist and most of their programming schedule are also heard on Rogers' rock-formatted stations in Northern Ontario, including CJRQ-FM in Sudbury, CJQQ-FM in Timmins, CKFX-FM in North Bay, and CJQM-FM in Sault Ste. Marie. This includes their morning drive program The Brock & Dalby Show (hosted by Brock Lewis and Drew Dalby) and weekday afternoon/Classic Rock Sunday DJ Lew MacDonald, all based out of CIKR.
