= CFXN-FM =

Radio station in North Bay, Ontario, Canada

Coordinates: 46°18′10″N 79°24′39″W

- North Bay, Ontario; Canada
- Broadcast area: Nipissing District
- Frequency: 106.3 MHz
- Branding: 106.3 Jet FM

Programming
- Format: Classic hits

Ownership
- Owner: Vista Radio
- Sister stations: CFCH-FM

History
- First air date: July 12, 2006

Technical information
- Class: B1
- ERP: 10 kW
- HAAT: 145.4 metres (477 ft)

Links
- Webcast: Listen Live
- Website: mynorthbaynow.com

CFXN-FM, is a Canadian radio station, that airs a classic hits format at 106.3 FM in North Bay, Ontario. The station is branded as 106.3 Jet FM. The station plays a variety of current, recent and older hits. It is positioned between the city's top 40 and hard rock stations.

The station was licensed on the basis of a proposal to air a country format similar to that of the co-owned CHMT in Timmins. Instead, North Bay's CFXN broadcast an adult hits format from startup in 2006 as 106.3 Moose FM until changing to a light AC format in February, 2012, then to variety hits in April 2013. The new format of Biggest Variety stands alone as an option for 25- to 54-year-old listeners in the market.

Originally owned by Haliburton Broadcasting Group, the station was licensed by the CRTC in 2005. As of 2012 the station is owned by the Vista Broadcast Group.

On October 29, 2019, Vista applied to operate a new FM radio station in North Bay. The new station would operate at 90.5 MHz making it a sister station to CFXN-FM. Vista received CRTC approval to operate a new oldies radio station at North Bay on May 25, 2020. The call sign will be CFCH which are heritage calls for North Bay once belonging to what is now CKFX. Vista launched CFCH-FM at 90.5 MHz on June 15, 2021 with country music.

On June 7, 2023, the station rebranded as 106.3 Jet FM with a classic hits format.

== Former logos ==
106.3 Moose FM logo used from 2006 to 2023
