= Greg Beharrell =

Canadian radio personality

Greg Beharrell is a Canadian radio personality, who has hosted the internationally syndicated The Greg Beharrell Show since 2020.

Originally from London, Ontario, he was educated at the University of Western Ontario. He started his career as a technician for London's talk radio station CFPL, before debuting as an on-air personality on sister station CFPL-FM. He then spent a number of years as a host on CFEX-FM in Calgary, Alberta, before joining CFNY-FM in Toronto, Ontario, in 2013. After about a year on the evening shift at CFNY, he moved to mornings in March 2014 as cohost with Dominik Diamond and Josie Dye; however, the new program lasted only a few months due to poor listener reaction, and by July Beharrell had been reassigned as the afternoon drive host on CFOX-FM in Vancouver, British Columbia.

In 2015 he joined KITS in San Francisco, California, remaining with the station until joining KLOS in Los Angeles in 2017. Although now based in the United States, he was still heard in some Canadian radio markets as a voice-tracking host, including as the imaging voice for all of Canada's Jack FM-branded radio stations. In 2021 he won a Canadian Radio Award as Best Imaging Voice, Large Market for his Jack FM work.

His syndicated show was launched in 2020 through YEA Networks, and has since been picked up by many rock-formatted radio stations in both the United States and Canada. The program is recorded by Beharrell as a mixture of standard radio jock talk and comedy segments, but allows individual stations to program their own musical selections and schedule the program wherever they want, and has thus been marketed to rock stations regardless of their formatting as classic, modern, mainstream or active rock.
