= CKIS-FM =

Contemporary hit radio station in Toronto

Coordinates: 43°38′56″N 79°22′54″W

- Toronto, Ontario; Canada
- Broadcast area: Greater Toronto Area
- Frequency: 92.5 MHz (HD Radio)
- Branding: KiSS 92.5

Programming
- Language: English
- Format: Contemporary hit radio
- Subchannels: HD2: CFTR simulcast HD3: CJCL simulcast

Ownership
- Owner: Rogers Radio; (Rogers Media, Inc.)
- Sister stations: CFTR; CHFI-FM; CJCL; CFMT-DT; CITY-DT; CJMT-DT

History
- First air date: January 26, 1993
- Former call signs: CISS-FM (1993–2003); CJAQ-FM (2003–2009)
- Call sign meaning: "Kiss" (branding)

Technical information
- Licensing authority: CRTC
- Class: B
- ERP: 4,700 watts average 13,000 watts peak
- HAAT: 287.8 meters (944 ft)

Links
- Webcast: Listen live
- Website: www.kiss925.com

CKIS-FM (92.5 FM, Kiss 92.5) is a radio station in Toronto, Ontario, Canada. Owned by Rogers Radio, a division of Rogers Sports & Media, the station broadcasts a contemporary hit radio format.

The station was founded on January 26, 1993, as CISS-FM under the ownership of Rawlco Communications, and initially aired a "New Country" format. CISS was acquired by Rogers Communications on February 26, 1999, and was rebranded first as Power 92, then Kiss 92.5 as a Top 40 station, but the station was renamed to 92.5 Jack FM on June 4, 2003, with the call letters CJAQ-FM under an adult hits format before abandoning the concept in 2006, and played classic rock music. The current iteration of "Kiss" was relaunched on June 5, 2009.

CKIS studios are located at the Rogers Building at Bloor and Jarvis Streets in the northeastern corner of downtown Toronto, while its transmitter is located atop First Canadian Place.

CKIS can be heard as far north as Barrie, as far south as Niagara Falls, as far west as Kitchener, and as far east as Bowmanville.

== History ==
=== The beginning and Country music (1989–1999) ===
On July 31, 1989, the Canadian Radio-television and Telecommunications Commission (CRTC) announced a call for applications to license a new FM station on the 92.5 frequency, which was believed to be the last available FM frequency in the Toronto market. On August 8, 1990, Rawlco Communications was awarded a licence from the CRTC for a new FM radio station. The format chosen to air on the frequency was country music that would target an audience ranging from 25–54 years of age. Rawlco planned on changing frequencies for the station to 99.1 FM, which was formerly the home of CKO-FM-1, but cancelled the plan after the CRTC denied this. On January 26, 1993, at 1 p.m., singer Anne Murray pressed the button to launch the station, with the CISS-FM call letters and CISS-FM 92.5 (pronounced "kiss") branding.

The station's licensing by the Canadian Radio-television and Telecommunications Commission had been controversial, because the CRTC had passed over an application by Milestone Radio for an urban music station, which would have been a new format in the Toronto market, in favour of Rawlco's application. Milestone's second attempt at an urban station was also passed over in favour of CBLA-FM; the company finally won a licence on its third attempt, and launched CFXJ-FM in 2001.

=== First "Kiss" era (1999–2003) ===
Rogers Communications announced a deal to buy the station in February 1999. The deal would not be completed until August, but immediately after the deal was announced, Rogers took control of the station's programming by way of a local management agreement or LMA (at the time, LMAs were not actively regulated by the CRTC). Without much warning, on February 5, at 7:30 p.m., the station flipped formats to contemporary hit radio and changed monikers to Power 92, becoming the first city-grade Top 40 station to serve Toronto since the demise of CHOG in October 1995. The final song on "CISS" was "The Dance" by Garth Brooks, while the first song on "Power" was "Doo Wop (That Thing)" by Lauryn Hill.

The station's on-air staff was immediately let go. Some reports at the time indicated the staff had been taken out to a meal at a restaurant nearby, then returned to the station to find they were no longer allowed in. In a conversation recollecting the incident 23 years later, Mike Richards indicated that the staff had been invited to a fine dining restaurant and were expecting a meal but, after a lengthy delay, they were instead handed their layoff notices in one of the dining rooms. When the station flipped to Power, the station attracted adverse attention from the operators of CKDX, then a dance music station branded as Power 88.5 in Newmarket, north of Toronto, and from Corus Entertainment, which owned several "Power" stations in western Canada at the time, and who had taken steps towards potentially turning their Toronto rock music station CILQ-FM in a new direction as Power 107. On February 26, the station rebranded as Kiss 92 FM. The station would later rebrand as Kiss 92.5.

In its early days, the station also aired imaging material in which an announcer pronounced the name of the city "Toe-ron-toe", widely considered a mispronunciation of Toronto. New material was soon substituted.

Thanks to former CRTC content regulations on FM radio, CISS was the first, and remained the only, Top 40 station on FM licensed to the City of Toronto in the late 1990s and early 2000s (the closest formatted station in the market, CIDC-FM, which airs a rhythmic contemporary format, is licensed to Orangeville, and is a rimshot from the northwestern portion of the market). The station rode a wave of popularity for pop music acts like Backstreet Boys and 'NSYNC, and often seemed to supertarget a primary market of young teenage or preteen girls. In addition, CISS was more rhythmic-leaning than most Top 40 stations due to the market not having an urban or rhythmic station until 2001, when CFXJ-FM signed on the air with an urban contemporary format.

Station personalities included Jay Michaels, first paired with Daryn Jones as "Mad Dog and Daryn" and then with Billie Holiday in mornings as Mad Dog and Billie (frequently accompanied by voice actress Stephanie Beard as "Suga BayBee"), Kris James (a re-hired veteran of the country format, and temporarily the CHR format's first morning host) middays, Tarzan Dan afternoons, Cory Kimm and Taylor Kaye evenings, and Slim hosting "Slim Jams", a slow jam/R&B program in overnights.

By 2002, somewhat ironically, the station moved to take CFXJ's turf with a complete shift to a rhythmic contemporary format billed as "Toronto's Hip Hop and R&B". The station hired local urban flavoured talent DJX and Haddy, Axel, Kwame, DJ Baby Yu and RG.

=== Jack FM (2003–2009) ===
On June 4, 2003, at 4:07 p.m., the station flipped to the "Jack FM" branding and the adult hits format, which had proved quite successful on Rogers-owned stations in Calgary and Vancouver. The station would adopt the CJAQ-FM call letters in February 2004 (with CISS being moved to a Rogers-owned station in Ottawa). The station experienced a ratings drop after the flip, most likely because of the popularity of the previous format. However, once the station established itself, the station gained a boost in the ratings.

When it first launched, "Jack" operated without disc jockeys in an effort to establish the "Playing What We Want" concept which was new to Toronto. Though DJs were introduced within weeks of the debut, the station would become Canada's first DJ-free station in late September 2005. At the time, station GM/program director Pat Cardinal cited the move was "a result of listener feedback. The audience has been telling us that they want no DJs on Jack. They want more music." In November 2005, Cardinal defended his decision in an interview with Michael Hainsworth of Report on Business Television and stated why he doesn't see commercial-free iPods and satellite radio as a threat to a non-DJ format. Despite the move, the station's ratings would dive from a 4.1 share in 2005 to the 2.3 share range in 2006.

Pat Cardinal would be replaced as GM/PD in June 2006 by Steve Kennedy, who had experience with the "Jack" format in Calgary. The previous month, the "Jack" playlist would be adjusted to mainstream rock, with the station dropping most pop songs in an effort to compete against Corus-owned stations CILQ-FM and CFNY-FM. The move put a dent in the music variety that is a hallmark of the "Jack" format and its "playing what we want" slogan (which CJAQ still used at the time and would not replace until March 2008, when it adopted the slogan "Toronto's Best Rock Variety"). The move to rock would further hamper CJAQ's overall share in the Toronto radio market (down 17%), even in the male target demographic (down 14%).

On December 11, 2006, CJAQ abandoned its DJ-free format when they launched a new morning show featuring Ben McVie and Kerry Gray, the former morning team at CJDV-FM in Kitchener. DJs would surface on other dayparts on December 12, including Jeff Chalmers and Samantha Stevens. Ben and Kerry were eventually fired on August 16, 2007, and replaced by Jeff Chalmers and Larissa Primeau. Chalmers and Primeau were dismissed in September 2008, and replaced by Carly Klassen and Jeff Brown. (Brown, the former PD of CHEZ-FM in Ottawa, replaced Steve Kennedy as PD on July 4, 2007, when Rogers market manager Sandy Sanderson became GM). Brown and Klassen would be holding down both the morning and afternoon drive slots by May 2009, one month after "Jack FM" registered a dismal 2.0 share in the BBM ratings results for the Toronto market.

=== Second "Kiss" era (2009–present) ===
At 3 p.m. on June 5, 2009 (one day after the 6th anniversary of Jack's launch), after playing "Boy Inside the Man" by Tom Cochrane & Red Rider, the station reverted to contemporary hit radio as KiSS 92.5. KiSS started with a stretch of 10,000 songs without commercial or DJ interruption, beginning with "Boom Boom Pow" by The Black Eyed Peas. KiSS (which would eventually swap the CJAQ-FM call sign for Calgary's CKIS-FM) features a music playlist consisting mainly of pop, hip-hop and R&B music; the station often avoids rock music, though it does include some Canadian rock artists to meet Canadian content regulations. CKIS competes head-on with Toronto area stations CKFM-FM, CIDC-FM (which airs a rhythmic contemporary format, and is based in the suburbs), as well as, to a lesser extent, Toronto hot adult contemporary station CHUM-FM, and Top 40 station WKSE in Buffalo.

It was announced on July 8, 2009, that ET Canada's Roz Weston will be hosting the new morning show, along with Mocha, formerly of CKBT-FM in Kitchener. Both were formerly co-hosts and producers of Mad Dog & Billie during the station's first Top 40 incarnation. Maurie Sherman (Damnit Maurie) joined the show as Senior Producer/Reporter in March 2011.

Beginning in January 2010, CKIS would offer "Commercial Free Mondays", a campaign patterned after many Top 40 stations across the United States, and offer hourly prize giveaways. (CKIS followed Edmonton's CHBN-FM as the second station in Canada to offer a whole day commercial-free; KiSS competitor CIDC-FM would follow suit one month later with a promotion they label as "The Zone", also on Mondays. The promotion label was dropped on May 13, 2011, to avoid confusion with the block aired on YTV).

In 2013, the station's DJ Clymaxxx and Mocha won their second consecutive Stylus Award for "Radio Mixshow DJs of the Year" for Set It Off.

== HD Radio ==
In April 2016, the CRTC granted approval for CKIS to utilize HD Radio operations. On June 27, CKIS added simulcasts of CFTR and CJCL on their HD2 and HD3 sub-channels, respectively.
