= Slaight Communications =

Canadian radio broadcasting company

- Type: Private
- Industry: Media
- Founded: 1925; 101 years ago (Standard Radio Manufacturing Corporation); 1929; 97 years ago (Rogers Majestic Corporation Limited); 1941; 85 years ago (Standard Radio Limited, renamed Standard Broadcasting 1966); 1985; 41 years ago (acquired and merged into Slaight Broadcasting)
- Founder: J. Allan Slaight
- Headquarters: 22 St. Clair Avenue East, Toronto, Ontario, Canada
- Key people: J. Allan Slaight (CEO 1985-2000); Gary Slaight (CEO 2000-present)
- Divisions: radio broadcasting

Slaight Communications is a Canadian radio broadcasting company. The company was formed as Slaight Broadcasting in 1971, when owner J. Allan Slaight acquired CFGM in Richmond Hill. Slaight later also acquired CFOX in Montreal and CHOK in Sarnia, and launched CILQ in Toronto.

The company later sold off all of its original assets, and continued to operate its radio holdings through the Standard Broadcasting division after Slaight bought out that company in 1985. As Standard, it remained the largest privately owned multimedia company in Canada until it sold its radio and TV broadcasting assets to Astral Media in 2007. Today, all of Standard Radio stations are either owned by Bell Media or Stingray Radio.

The company continues to operate holdings in non-traditional broadcast platforms such as satellite radio and Internet radio. Slaight also continues to hold minority investments in three other small radio station groups.

== Standard Broadcasting ==
Standard Broadcasting was founded as Standard Radio Manufacturing in 1925 by Edward S. Rogers, Sr., but soon became known as Rogers Vacuum Tube Company and later became the Rogers Majestic Corporation Limited. Rogers launched what would become radio station CFRB in 1927 in order to demonstrate a batteryless alternating current radio receiver he had invented.

In 1929 Standard Radio Manufacturing Corporation was renamed as Rogers Majestic Corporation Limited

The broadcasting division of the company was renamed Standard Radio Limited in 1941 when the Rogers family sold off the assets of Rogers Majestic two years after the death of Edward Rogers. The Rogers family would later re-enter the broadcasting business in 1960 in a form of Aldred-Rogers Broadcasting, the company founded by Edward's son, Ted Rogers, which later became Rogers Communications.

In 1945, Standard Radio was purchased by Argus Corporation and in 1966 Standard Radio Limited was renamed Standard Broadcasting. Argus was acquired by Conrad Black and his brother in 1978. Argus subsequently sold Standard to Slaight in 1985 and merged into Slaight Broadcasting.

=== Standard Broadcast News ===
Standard Broadcasting operated a national radio news service known initially as Standard Radio News and later as Standard Broadcast News (SBN). The service developed from the news operations of CFRB in Toronto and CJAD in Montreal. Lyman Potts of CFRB established a system through which participating stations could receive recorded news reports and actualities by telephone line. The service drew on material from CFRB and CJAD's parliamentary bureau in Ottawa, participating Canadian radio stations and NBC Radio News. It initially served stations in 13 Canadian cities and later expanded to 27.

The service competed with The Canadian Press's Broadcast News and other private radio news networks. During the late 1970s, Standard Radio News was renamed Standard Broadcast News in anticipation of expanding its service to television stations, although the television venture did not develop. By the 1980s, Standard Broadcast News and Broadcast News had emerged as the principal national news services supplying private Canadian radio stations.

SBN distributed daily audio news feeds to subscribing stations. Recordings preserved by Library and Archives Canada document the service's daily feeds during the 1980s. Its material was also supplied in wire form for use in local newscasts.

After NBC Radio News, SBN's principal international news supplier, ceased operations in 1990, Standard obtained Canadian rights to CBS Radio News. By the early 1990s, SBN was providing material to more than 100 radio stations. The cost of maintaining the national service increasingly fell on Standard Broadcasting, however, and by 1994 the company was subsidizing it by more than $1 million annually. Standard consequently ended service to outside subscribers and retained the news operation primarily for its own stations.

== Merged operations ==
As Standard, the company under Slaight operated 82 radio stations in English Canada and two television stations in northern British Columbia. It also owned a significant minority interest in the radio station operators Milestone Radio, Haliburton Broadcasting Group and 3937844 Canada Inc. in Canada, and Martz Communications Group in the US. The company also operated divisions in e-commerce, videotape and DVD distribution, retail marketing and audio and video post-production, and was the primary shareholder in the satellite radio provider Sirius Canada.

In 2006, the company announced an initial public offering via an income trust; these plans were later cancelled due to "market conditions". On February 23, 2007, Astral Media announced that it had signed a letter of intent and had entered into exclusive negotiations regarding the acquisition of "substantially all of the assets" of Standard. A formal agreement was later announced, with the proposed transaction being approved by the CRTC on September 28, 2007. Astral would eventually be taken over by Bell Media on July 5, 2013.

Astral did not acquire Standard's Internet and satellite radio assets, nor its minority interests in various other radio stations. The transaction was finalized on October 29, 2007, and Standard changed its name to Slaight Communications the following day.

== Current assets ==
After selling its Standard Radio assets to Astral Media in October 2007, Slaight Communications remained the owner and operator of Internet radio portal Iceberg Radio, which was subsequently also sold to Astral in a separate transaction. The company is still a partner, along with Canadian Satellite Radio Holdings, Sirius XM Radio and the Canadian Broadcasting Corporation, in SiriusXM Canada.

The company also retained its minority shares in the Haliburton, Milestone and Martz radio groups, although all three groups have since sold off many or all of their assets as well.

Standard's minority share in 3937844 Canada was also not transferred to Astral, but was wholly acquired by its majority owner, Newcap Broadcasting, in a separate transaction which also took place in 2007.

In 2010, the company invested in Mediazoic, a webcasting software project.

Slaight Communications owns a 7.19% stake in Fight Holdings, a minority partner in Anthem Sports & Entertainment.
