= CKKW-FM =

Radio station in Kitchener, Ontario

Coordinates: 43°24′15″N 80°38′04″W

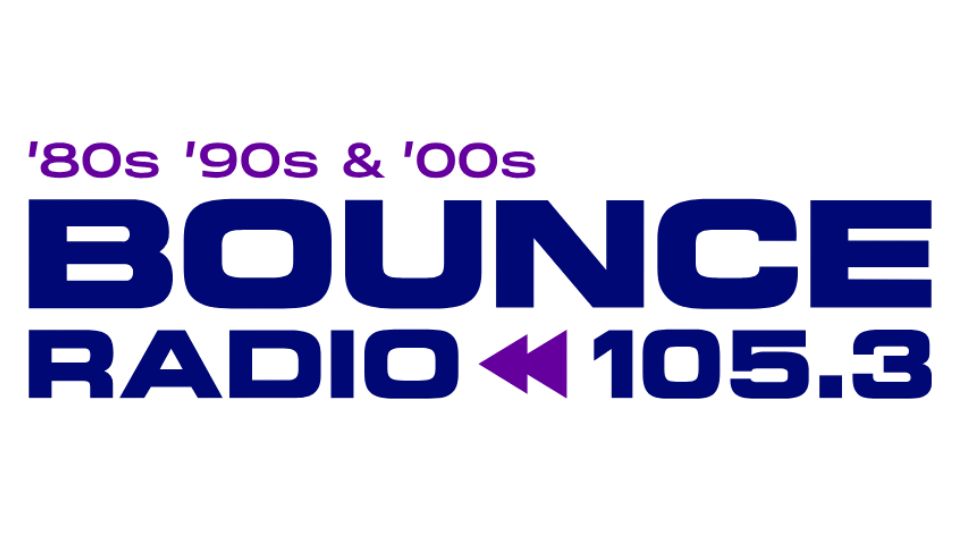
- Kitchener, Ontario; Canada
- Broadcast area: Waterloo Region
- Frequency: 105.3 MHz
- Branding: Bounce 105.3

Programming
- Format: Adult hits
- Affiliations: Premiere Networks

Ownership
- Owner: Bell Media; (Bell Media Radio)
- Sister stations: CFCA-FM, CKCO-DT

History
- First air date: 1949
- Former call signs: CFCA-FM (1949–2026)
- Former frequencies: 106.1 MHz (1949–1951)
- Call sign meaning: Kitchener-Waterloo (broadcast area)

Technical information
- Licensing authority: CRTC
- Class: C1
- ERP: 100,000 watts
- HAAT: 250 metres (820 ft)

Links
- Webcast: Listen live (via iHeartRadio)
- Website: bounceradio.ca/kitchener-waterloo/

CKKW-FM is a Canadian radio station broadcasting at 105.3 FM in Kitchener, Ontario. The station currently plays an adult hits format branded as Bounce 105.3.

CKKW's studios and offices are located in Waterloo, and their transmitter is on Baden Hill (also known as the Baden Tower), just west of the Kitchener city limits.

== History ==
Originally as CFCA, the station was first launched on 106.1 FM in 1949 by local broadcaster Carl Pollock. It was the first FM radio station in Canada to operate independently, without an AM sister station. Due to the limited audience reach of FM radio at the time, however, the station left the air in 1951. Pollock subsequently launched television station CKCO-TV in 1954 and AM radio station CKKW in 1959, and then relaunched CFCA in 1967 as an easy listening station. Pollock's broadcast holdings became part of Electrohome in 1970.

CFCA and CKKW were tentatively sold in 1992 to a local consortium consisting of Jack Schoone, a former local radio announcer, and Irving Zucker, a former owner of competing stations CKGL and CHYM-FM, but the deal fell through and the stations were instead acquired by CHUM Radio in 1993. By then the station had migrated from its beautiful music/easy listening sound to a brighter adult contemporary format.

=== Kool FM (1994–2016) ===
On August 12, 1994 at Noon, CFCA flipped to classic rock as 105.3 Kool FM.

During the early 2000s, the station added pop/rock songs into their playlist, and shifted towards Hot AC, but retained the rock lean and the "Kool FM" moniker.

CTVglobemedia became the stations' owner when it acquired CHUM Radio in 2007, and is currently owned by Bell Media since 2011.

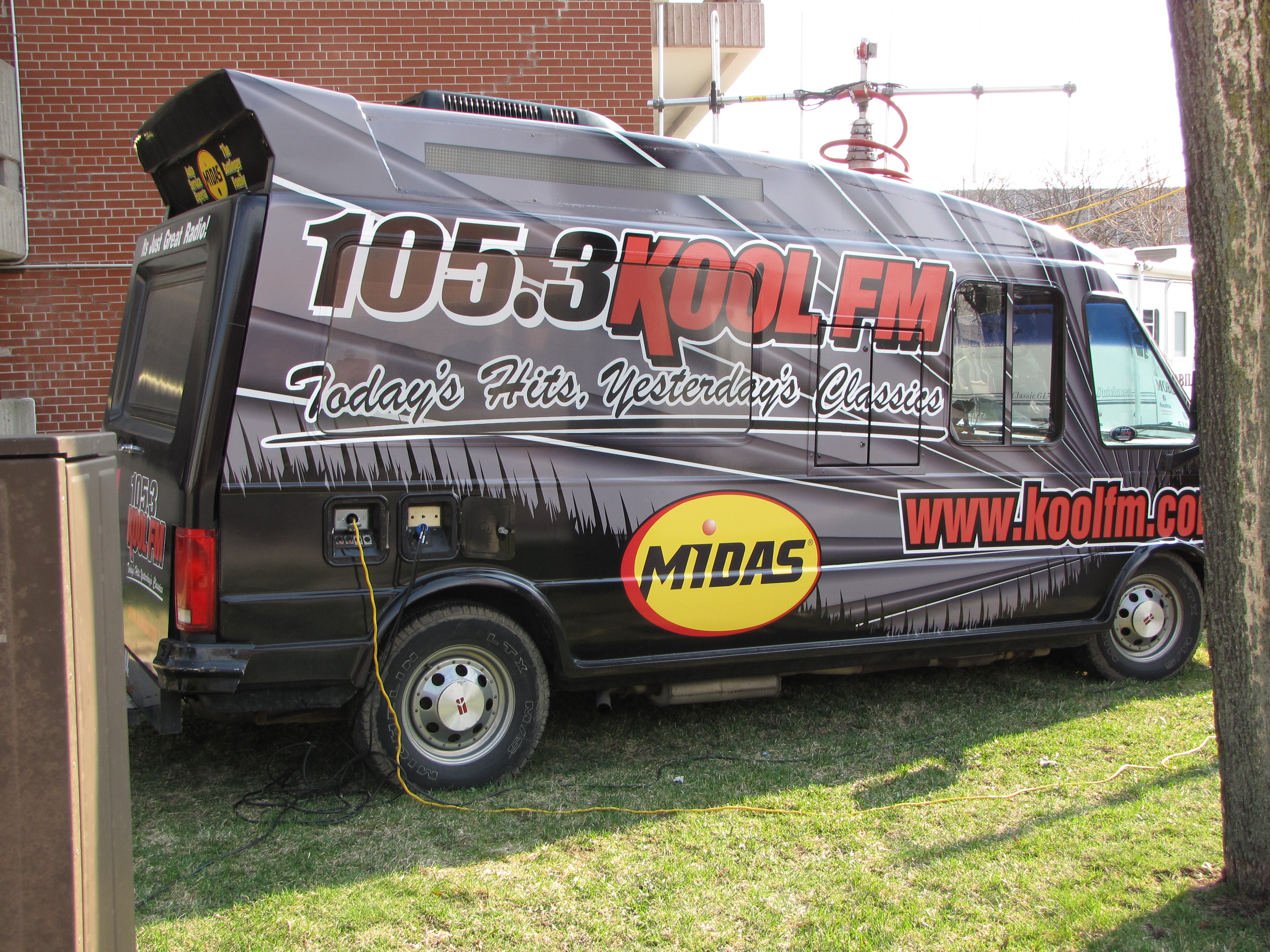
View of one of the Kool FM remote vehicles

In 2012, CFCA was slightly rebranded as Kool 105.3, with a new logo and a new slogan "Today's Best Variety".

=== Virgin Radio (2016–2026) ===
Former "Virgin" logo (2019–2026)

On July 26, 2016, CFCA began stunting with Christmas music, while teasing a change to come that Friday (July 29) at Noon. At that time, CFCA flipped to Top 40/CHR, branded as 105.3 Virgin Radio, making CFCA the 8th station in Canada to utilize the "Virgin Radio" branding. (At the same time as CFCA's flip, CJCH-FM in Halifax rebranded to "Virgin".) The first song on "Virgin" (as well as Halifax's "Virgin") was "This Is What You Came For" by Calvin Harris and Rihanna.

=== Bounce Radio (2026–present) ===
On July 23, 2026, Bell Media announced a frequency swap for the Virgin Radio and Bounce networks in the Kitchener-Waterloo market, taking effect on July 28 (a day before the official 10th anniversary of Virgin Radio's debut on the 105.3 frequency). CFCA would, at that time, take on CKKW-FM (99.5)'s adult hits format as Bounce 105.3, while CKKW will assume 105.3's previous CHR format as 99.5 Virgin Radio. The move marks a downgrade in signal in Kitchener for Virgin Radio, and a corresponding upgrade in signal for Bounce; Bounce host Angie Hill noted the 105.3 facility reaches as far as Owen Sound and Toronto, while the majority of listeners to Virgin on 105.3 were in and around Kitchener and will be adequately served by 99.5. Virgin Radio is also available in nearby markets via CIQM-FM (97.5) London and CKFM-FM (99.9) Toronto, whereas Bounce has no other coverage in the immediate region.

On July 28, 2026, at the said time, the station picked up CKKW’s adult hits format as "Bounce 105.3" and the call letters. The first song played on "Bounce" was "Start Me Up" by the English rock band The Rolling Stones, the first song played on the station as "Kool FM" in 1994.

This move effectively brings the Bounce branding back to the Owen Sound and Hamilton areas after CJOS-FM and CKLH-FM were sold in 2025.
