= CKCO-DT =

Television station in Kitchener, Ontario

- Kitchener, Ontario; Canada
- Channels: Digital: 13 (VHF); Virtual: 13
- Branding: CTV Kitchener

Programming
- Affiliations: 13.1: CTV

Ownership
- Owner: Bell Media Inc.
- Sister stations: TV: CFPL-DT, CHWI-DT; Radio: CKKW-FM, CFCA-FM

History
- First air date: March 1, 1954
- Former call signs: CKCO-TV (1954–2011)
- Former channel numbers: Analog: 13 (VHF, 1954–2011)
- Former affiliations: CBC (1954–1963)
- Call sign meaning: Covering Kitchener & Central Ontario

Technical information
- Licensing authority: CRTC
- ERP: 12 kW
- HAAT: 291.9 m (958 ft)
- Transmitter coordinates: 43°24′17″N 80°38′5″W

Links
- Website: CTV Kitchener

CKCO-DT (channel 13) is a television station in Kitchener, Ontario, Canada, owned and operated by the CTV Television Network, a division of Bell Media. It is sister to London-based CTV2 outlet CFPL-DT (channel 10), although the two stations maintain separate operations. CKCO-DT's studios are located on King Street East on the south side of Kitchener, and its transmitter is located at Baden Tower between Snyders Road East and Highway 7 in Baden, just west of the Kitchener city limits.

== History ==
CKCO-TV's logo under BBS affiliation, used from 1994 to 1997. The logo featured multicoloured rings around the "BBS" acronym, adapted from CFTO's logo. Although under the ownership of Electrohome, the station still adopted the BBS logo. Other BBS stations used a similar logo, the only difference being the call signs. The previous CKCO logo was dropped in 1994 which featured a horse-drawn Conestoga wagon and the Electrohome logo. Fifty percent of CKCO was bought by Baton in 1996 and one year later, Baton assumed full control of CKCO. The CKCO logo remained until 1997, when it was dropped in favour of a logo featuring "CKCO" in gold lettering and the CTV logo.

The station first signed on the air at 6 p.m. on March 1, 1954. Its signal transmitted from the Baden Tower (a transmitter on Baden Hill), near Baden, just west of Kitchener. The transmitter has become one of the most identifiable landmarks in the area. Originally, like all privately owned television stations in Canada from 1953 to 1959, CKCO was an affiliate of the CBC; it became an affiliate of CTV in 1963. The station increased its transmitter power in the early 1960s to reach London, from which Kitchener then received CBC affiliate programs on CFPL-TV.

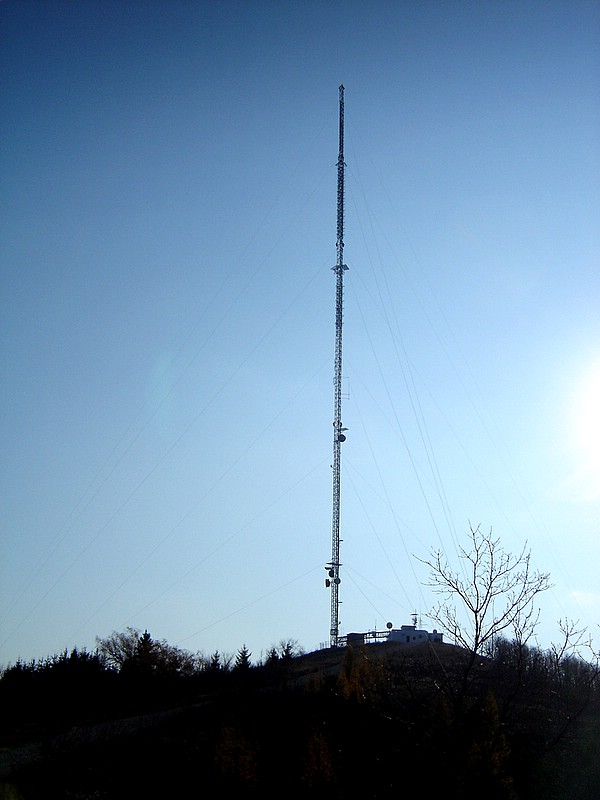
CKCO's transmission tower on Baden Hill

CKCO was originally owned by Central Ontario Television, a consortium that included the Famous Players theatre chain (now owned by Cineplex Entertainment) and businessman Carl Arthur Pollock, president of the family-owned television manufacturer Electrohome, although his broadcast holdings – which also included radio stations CFCA-FM and CKKW – were operated by a separate company. At one time, CKCO was owned by CAP Communications, whose name was taken from Pollock's initials; a corporate reorganization in 1970 placed the stations directly under the ownership of Electrohome, which also acquired control of CKCO when Canadian broadcasting laws required domestic ownership of stations, ending the involvement of American-owned Famous Players, which at the time was owned by Paramount Pictures' parent company Gulf + Western (the latter was acquired by the original Viacom). CKCO would become the first station in Canada to provide closed captioning for all of its local newscasts, in 1988.

In the 1990s, Baton Broadcasting had owned competing local stations in southwestern Ontario (CFPL-TV in London, CHWI-TV in Windsor, CKNX-TV in Wingham). A deal between Electrohome and Baton in 1996 resulted in each company owning 50% of these stations, as well as CKCO-TV, among other Canadian stations. The following year, another deal gave Baton control over CKCO-TV, while CHUM Limited took control over the other southwestern Ontario stations (which presently operate as owned-and-operated stations of the CTV Two television system). CTVglobemedia reacquired CFPL, CHWI, and CKNX in 2007 as a result of a takeover of CHUM Limited.

In 1998, Baton changed its name to CTV Inc. after becoming the sole owner of CTV, ending the decades of cooperative ownership of the network. In 2000, BCE purchased CTV Inc. and combined it with NetStar Communications and The Globe and Mail into Bell Globemedia. The company changed its name in 2007 to CTVglobemedia after BCE reduced its ownership interest. In September 2010, BCE re-acquired full ownership of CTV Inc., which changed its name once again to Bell Media in 2011 when the acquisition was finalized.

On October 3, 2005, CKCO ceased identifying by its call letters, adopting the local brand "CTV Southwestern Ontario", with its newscasts rebranding from CKCO News to CTV News. The local brand reflected the fact that, at that time, the station provided some coverage of news in areas southwest of Waterloo Region. While it remains the CTV main-network station for all of Southwestern Ontario, CKCO has since refocused its news-gathering resources exclusively on Waterloo Region and the Guelph area, avoiding direct competition with its sister CTV Two stations in other parts of southwestern Ontario for local news coverage. In early April 2012, presumably to end any confusion about its mandate, the station changed its on-air branding to "CTV Kitchener".

== Programming ==
Before CKCO was a CTV owned-and-operated station, the station produced considerably more local non-news programming:

- Canadian Bandstand (1958–1974), resembling American Bandstand in some respects. Hosts included Wally Crouter, Gary McLaren, Ron Hill, Reg Sellner, Peter Emmerson and Grant (Grantly) Hoffman.
- Bowling for Dollars (c. 1970s–1992)
- Camp Cariboo (1985–1989)
- Romper Room, a children's program, was broadcast nationally on CTV from the mid-1960s to 1992
- Polka Time (originally Gemütlichkeit), hosted by Grammy Award winning polka musician Walter Ostanek
- Sunday AM
- Provincewide, anchored by award-winning journalist Daiene Vernile. (1985–2014)
- Tree House, a Catholic Christian children's program (1972–1990)
- Several programs hosted by Big Al, including the noon-time Big Al's Cartoon Capers, Big Al's Talent Showcase, and Big Al's Ranch Party in the late afternoon
- The Johnnie Walters Show was a daily hourlong morning show hosted by Johnnie Walters featuring guests, an exercise segment, horoscopes, and a cooking segment from the mid-1970s and early 1980s. It replaced an earlier show hosted by Walters, Horoscope Dollars, featuring Walters calling area residents at random with a question, the correct answer to which depended on them viewing that particular show. Some of the most entertaining moments came during the time spent dialing and waiting for numbers to connect, as he engaged in informal banter with offscreen crew and organist Pat Ludwig.
- Trivia Company featured Johnnie Walters and ran from 1983 to 1988. This half-hour show was done in a game show format, and featured Walters taking a mobile unit on the street asking various people trivia questions for cash prizes. The show was revived from 1992 to 1994 by CFPL-TV in London and then CFTO-TV in Toronto.

The station continues to produce a limited amount of local programming in addition to its local newscasts. CKCO presently broadcasts church services each Sunday morning at 10 a.m. from two Kitchener area churches: St. Andrew's Presbyterian Church and St. Peters Lutheran Church, which are alternated each week. CKCO serves as the flagship station for CTV's broadcasts of the Kitchener-Waterloo Oktoberfest parade, which is held each Thanksgiving Day in the Twin Cities.

=== Newscasts and other local programming ===
CKCO-DT presently broadcasts 15 hours of locally produced newscasts each week (with three hours each weekday). Prior to 1998, when Baton Broadcasting rebranded all the CTV stations identically, CKCO's newscast was called CKCO Action News. In the past, the station's newscasts were branded as Scan NewsHour and Ontario Report.

The station operates a news bureau in Chatham, Ontario, and also had a bureau in Windsor at the corner of Park Street and Victoria Avenue, on the ground floor of the Victoria Park Place apartments. This bureau was shut down in 1994, shortly after the launch of independent station/semi-BBS affiliate CHWI. The spot was abandoned for several years, still showing the faded "CKCO-TV 42" banners atop its storefront for a few years (it is now home to a convenience store).

News veterans who had their start at the station include Jeff Hutcheson, Lisa LaFlamme and Ron Johnston. Bill Inkol was a long-time sportscaster not only for the station, but often for CTV's national sports broadcasts. He was also a host of Bowling for Dollars. "Big Al" ("Al" Elwood Jones) was the long-time host of after-school Big Al's Ranch Party, Big Al's Talent Showcase, Big Al's Cartoon Capers, Big Al and the Flintstones, as well as other children's programs at the station.

Oopsy the Clown, a children's performer portrayed by St. Thomas native Bob McNea (1929–2005), moved to CKCO after appearing for several years on Detroit NBC affiliate WWJ-TV (now WDIV-TV), where he served as Detroit's "Bozo the Clown". During the 1970s, it was found that the cartoons seen on Bozo were too violent and WWJ executives offered Bob the opportunity to create a new clown show. During a Bozo episode it was announced that Bozo was leaving television to go back and join the circus. He phoned his clown cousin "Oopsy" and during a split screen conversation (with Bob playing both Bozo and Oopsy) Oopsy agreed to replace him. The Oopsy the Clown Show aired for a while on WWJ as McNea decided to move back to Canada and join CKCO-TV.

Gary McLaren worked in the station's news department for 39 years from 1957 to 1996, spending most of that time in an on-air role, and also hosted Canadian Bandstand in the 1960s and the weekend newsmagazine show Sunday AM. Daiene Vernile anchored and produced the weekly program Provincewide from 1985 until April 2014, making it the longest continuously running, locally produced newsmagazine program in Canada. Other personalities during the station's history included local daytime show hosts such as Elaine Cole, Betty Thompson and Johnnie Walters. Thompson was also a long-time host of Romper Room. Bob Bratina hosted Polka Time with Walter Ostanek and replaced "Big Al" as host of Talent Showcase prior to Oopsy the Clown and his talent show Big Top Talent.

CKCO was known for many years for the red jackets worn by news anchors on their newscasts, a practice that began in 1967 with the emergence of colour television and continued until 1989. On August 18, 2012, the Saturday edition of CTV News at Six was expanded to one hour replacing The Beat. On April 20, 2014, the Sunday edition of CTV News at Six was also expanded to an hour replacing the long-running show Provincewide.

From January 2017, local news was presented in 16:9 SD. On September 18, 2017, CTV Kitchener launched its own edition of CTV News at Five. Bell Media initially announced that high-definition production of CTV News Kitchener would commence on September 25. However, the launch date was delayed to October 2, with CTV News at Noon being the first local newscast to be presented in high-definition from the CTV Kitchener studios.

CKCO's noon and weekend newscasts were cancelled on February 8, 2024, as part of nationwide programming cuts by Bell Media.

== Technical information ==
=== Subchannel ===
Subchannel of CKCO-DT
Subchannel	Res.	Short name	Programming
13.1	1080i	CKCO	CTV

=== Analog-to-digital conversion ===
As part of Canada's transition to digital television, CKCO flash-cut to digital on August 31, 2011. While originally allocated channel 7 for its digital signal, CKCO-DT was established on channel 13 instead in order to avoid interference with the digital signal of Buffalo, New York's WBBZ-TV.

=== Former rebroadcasters ===
CKCO was also previously seen in the Bruce Peninsula and Georgian Bay region on channel 2 from the CKCO-TV-2 transmitter at Wiarton, which began operation in 1971.

CKCO-TV-2 was on a long list of CTV rebroadcasters nationwide that was set to shut down on or before August 31, 2009, as part of a political dispute with Canadian authorities on paid fee-for-carriage requirements for cable television operators. A subsequent change in ownership assigned full control of CTVglobemedia to Bell Media; as a result, CKCO-TV-2 remained in normal licensed broadcast operation.

In February 2014, CKCO-TV-2 was shut down as a result of a power failure combined with a property dispute with a neighbouring landowner, which blocked service vans from driving up to the site to make repairs, forcing technicians to walk through fields in snowshoes in cold winter weather. A diesel generator kept the transmitter in operation in the short term, but it would later fail, with the ongoing property dispute blocking efforts to repair that as well. Bell Media applied to surrender its license for CKCO-TV-2 to the CRTC in August 2014, after CKCO received fewer than thirty calls from viewers and advertisers regarding the outage, as well as the fact that the transmitter cost six times more to run than the amount taken in.

CKCO-TV logo from 1977, indicating the Sarnia channel 42 transmitter

In addition to the Baden tower, CKCO was served in the Sarnia area by rebroadcaster CKCO-TV-3, on UHF channel 42. This transmitter, actually located at Oil Springs, was established on May 16, 1975, and commenced broadcasts on November 5 of that year. The station was available over-the-air and on cable in extreme eastern and southeastern Michigan in such towns as Port Huron and St. Clair Shores, and appeared in Detroit-area television listings. The station targeted Sarnia, Chatham, and most of Lambton and Kent counties. CKCO continues to be carried in these areas, along with Windsor and Essex County on Cogeco Cable on channel 13 (SD only; HDTV is provided in these areas by sister station CFTO).

Programming on CKCO-TV-3 was originally the same as the main CKCO signal, except for local inserts during newscasts and local commercials. In 2009, it was announced that CKCO-TV-3 was scheduled to cease producing distinct local programming by August 31 of that year, but expected to continue operations as a rebroadcaster. As of September 2009, CKCO-TV-3 ceased airing alternate local programming for the Sarnia and Chatham area and became a direct simulcast of CKCO-DT.

On July 30, 2019, Bell Media was granted permission to close down CKCO-TV-3 as part of Broadcasting Decision CRTC 2019-268. This transmitter was shut down on May 2, 2020.

Prior to 1999, the station also broadcast on channel 11 to Muskoka and Parry Sound from the CKCO-TV-4 transmitter at Dwight, near Huntsville. This transmitter first signed on the air on February 25, 1976. In 1999, that transmitter began relaying the signal of CKNY-TV in North Bay; it has since become a rebroadcaster of Sudbury's CICI.
