= CKMP =

CKMP may refer to:

- CKMP, a political party in Turkey
- CKMP-FM, a radio station (90.3 FM) licensed to Calgary, Alberta, Canada
- CICZ-FM, a radio station (104.1 FM) licensed to Midland, Ontario, Canada, which held the call sign CKMP from 1959 to 1994
