= CFCA-FM =

Radio station in Kitchener, Ontario

Coordinates: 43°24′13″N 80°31′54″W

- Kitchener, Ontario; Canada
- Broadcast area: Waterloo Region
- Frequency: 99.5 MHz (HD Radio)
- Branding: 99.5 Virgin Radio

Programming
- Format: Contemporary hit radio
- Subchannels: HD2: Pure Country

Ownership
- Owner: Bell Media
- Sister stations: CKKW-FM, CKCO-DT

History
- First air date: July 30, 1959
- Former call signs: CKKW (1959–2009); CKKW-FM (2009–2026)
- Former frequencies: 1320 kHz (1959–1975); 1090 kHz (1975–2009)
- Call sign meaning: "Carl A Pollock"

Technical information
- Licensing authority: CRTC
- Class: B1
- ERP: 1,700 watts (average); 4,300 watts (peak)
- HAAT: 110 metres (360 ft)

Links
- Webcast: Listen live (via iHeartRadio)
- Website: virginradio.ca/kitchener/

CFCA-FM (99.5 FM) is a commercial radio station in Kitchener, Ontario, serving the Waterloo Region. It is owned by Bell Media and airs an contemporary hit radio format branded as 99.5 Virgin Radio. The studios and offices are on King Street East, off Ontario Highway 8, in Kitchener.

CFCA-FM has an effective radiated power (ERP) of 1,700 watts (4,300 watts peak). The transmitter is located off Ottawa Street South near Trussler Park in Kitchener. CFCA-FM broadcasts using HD Radio technology. The HD2 subchannel carries the "Pure Country" radio network.

== History ==
=== 1090 AM ===
CKKW signed on the air on July 30, 1959. It began as an AM station, broadcasting on 1320 kilocycles. It moved to 1090 AM in 1975, powered at 10,000 watts, using a directional antenna. For most of its time on the AM band, CKKW aired a full service, middle of the road format of adult popular music, news and sports. In February 1984, CKKW began broadcasting in AM stereo, using the Motorola C-Quam format.

CKKW was originally owned by Carl Pollock and later becoming a subsidiary of his company Electrohome. CHUM Limited acquired CKKW in 1993. On February 11, 1994, CKKW dropped their then-Top 40 format and flipped to oldies as Oldies 1090. This was maintained until 2009, except for a brief period from 2001 to 2002 when it was part of CHUM's short-lived sports radio network, The Team.

=== Move to FM ===
On April 10, 2008, CKKW applied to the Canadian Radio-television and Telecommunications Commission to convert the station to the FM band at 99.5 MHz. The application indicated that CKKW would keep its oldies format after the switch. The application was approved on October 3, 2008.

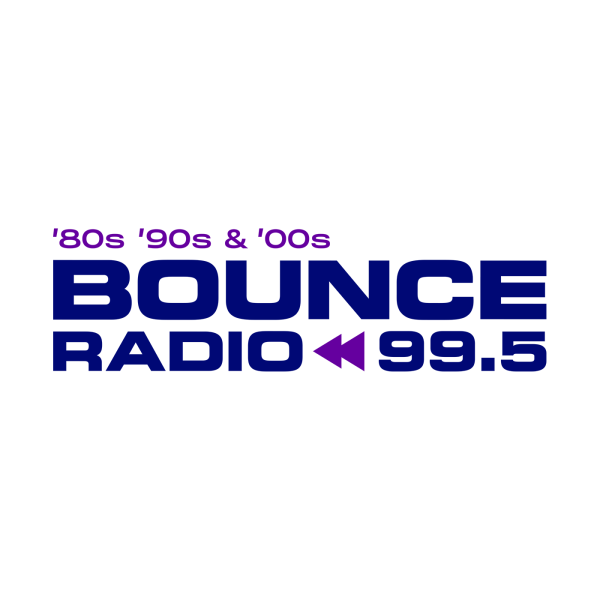
Former logo as "Bounce 99.5" used from 2021–2026

The flip, which occurred on January 6, 2009, resulted in a continuation of the oldies format as KFUN 99.5. Although the station was allowed to simulcast at 1090 AM until April 6 of that year, the AM signal was likely shut down on January 16. The old AM towers were taken down in March. CKKW later flipped to adult hits, but kept the same call sign and branding.

As part of a mass format reorganization by Bell Media, on May 18, 2021, CKKW rebranded as Bounce 99.5.

On July 23, 2026, Bell Media announced a frequency swap for the Virgin Radio and Bounce networks in the Kitchener-Waterloo market, taking effect on July 28. CKKW will take on CFCA-FM (105.3)'s contemporary hit radio format as 99.5 Virgin Radio, while the higher-powered CFCA will assume 99.5's adult hits programming as Bounce 105.3. Bounce host Angie Hill noted the 105.3 facility reaches as far as Owen Sound and Toronto, extending the Bounce brand's reach, while the majority of listeners to Virgin on 105.3 were in and around Kitchener and will be adequately served by 99.5. On July 28, 2026, at the said time, the station picked up CFCA’s contemporary hit radio format as "99.5 Virgin Radio". The first song aired as "Virgin" was Pink Pony Club by Chappell Roan. The station also obtained the CFCA call letters.
