= Betty Thompson =

Canadian television personality (1934–1994)

- Born: 1934; Walkerton, Ontario, Canada
- Died: 1994 (aged 59–60)
- Cause of death: Breast cancer
- Education: Ryerson Polytechnical Institute
- Occupation: Television presenter
- Employer: CKCO-TV

Betty Thompson (1934–1994) was a Canadian television presenter who spent most of her career at CKCO-TV in Kitchener, Ontario. She was seen throughout Canada as host of CTV's version of Romper Room, a children's programme produced at CKCO's studios.

She was born in Walkerton, Ontario, raised in Peterborough, Ontario and studied broadcasting at Ryerson Polytechnical Institute. She was married twice and had three daughters, Susan, Patricia and Judith.

The annual Betty Thompson Golf Classic began in 1992 as a financial support for breast cancer education and research. She would die from this disease in 1994, four years after diagnosis. During her lifetime, Thompson would contribute to many charitable and community causes, particularly in Kitchener and its region. The causes included Oktoberfest and Big Sisters.

During the four years she suffered from cancer, she openly discussed her disease, and was an advocate for its treatment. The Betty Thompson Youth Centre, which opened in 1996 and has been run by Lutherwood since late 2000, is named after her.

== Career ==
Betty began her career at CKCO in 1956, following graduation from Ryerson. Initially she was hired to write commercials which were performed live. After leaving the station for a teaching career, she returned in 1971. In 1972–1975 she became the first host of national edition of Romper Room as "Miss Betty" airing on the CTV Television Network, she returned in 1992 for a 20th anniversary special. She also hosted other shows such as Ladies First, The Flower Spot, Be My Guest, Tempo Ontario, Betty and Friends, numerous magazine shows, parades, and appeared at the Canadian National Exhibition. In 1992 she became the station's community relations coordinator.

== Recognition ==
- 1990: Kitchener Mayor's Dinner Honouree
- --: Rotary Club of Kitchener Paul Harris Fellow
- 1991: Kitchener-Waterloo Citizen of the Year by the twin-cities' Junior Chamber of Commerce
- 1992: Kitchener-Waterloo Cancer Society's fund raising campaign honorary chair
- 1995: Waterloo Region Hall of Fame Inductee
- 2007: Waterloo 150 Project - "Profiles of the Past, Present and Future: Waterloo at 150"
