= KICX =

KICX may refer to:

- KICX-FM 96.1, a radio station in McCook, Nebraska, United States
- CICS-FM 91.7, a radio station in Sudbury, Ontario, Canada that uses "KICX" as a branding
