= Larche Communications =

Canadian media company

Larche Communications was a Canadian media company, which operated four radio stations in the province of Ontario. The company was named for its president, Paul Larche.

Based in Midland, the company began in 1997 when it acquired CICZ-FM in Midland. Larche later expanded to Waterloo when it was licensed to open a new station, CIKZ. The company later entered an agreement with Rogers Media in 2007, selling CIKZ to that company in exchange for CICX-FM in Orillia.

Larche's application for a new radio station in Sudbury was also approved by the CRTC on July 12, 2007. This station, CICS-FM, officially launched on August 18, 2008. On May 9, 2008, the company was also given CRTC authorization to launch a rock-formatted station in Owen Sound on 92.3 FM.

On November 13, 2008, Larche applied for two new FM radio stations, a hot adult contemporary station in Orillia and a country music station to serve the Bracebridge/Gravenhurst area. The CRTC denied both applications from Larche Communications to operate new radio stations in Orillia, Bracebridge and Gravenhurst, however, an application from another company received approval to operate a new FM station in Orillia on June 1, 2009.

On August 9, 2017, Bell Media announced that it would acquire Larche Communications' stations, pending CRTC approval. Bell Media received approval from the CRTC on February 14, 2018.

== Stations ==
- Midland - CICZ-FM
- Orillia - CICX-FM
- Owen Sound - CJOS-FM
- Sudbury - CICS-FM
