= Jacqueline Milczarek =

Canadian news anchor

Jacqueline Milczarek was a Canadian news anchor for CTV News Channel broadcasting on weekend afternoons. She started working for CTV News in 2007. Before she joined CTV News, Milczarek was a reporter and part-time anchor to Global TV's First National with Peter Kent, as well as at Windsor, Ontario's CHWI-TV when it launched in 1993. She has earned two RTNDA Awards for coverage of Pope John Paul's visit to Canada during the World Youth Day in 2002 as well as for a story about a man who recovered from a coma. Milczarek graduated from Ryerson Polytechnical Institute.
