= John A. Pollock (businessman) =

Canadian businessman (1936–2026)

- Born: 18 January 1936; Kitchener, Ontario
- Died: 12 January 2026 (aged 89)
- Education: University of Toronto (BASc '59); Harvard University (MBA '62)
- Spouse: Joyce Mary Smethurst (m. 1963)
- Father: Carl Pollock

John Albon Pollock (18 January 1936 – 12 January 2026) was a Canadian businessman who was the president of his family's company, Electrohome, from 1972 to 2008. He also was the seventh chancellor of Wilfrid Laurier University, and he held this position from March 31, 2008 to October 28, 2011.

== Early life and career ==
Pollock was born and raised in Kitchener, Ontario, Canada, obtaining a Bachelor of Applied Science degree from the University of Toronto, where he was President of the Alpha Delta Phi fraternity and a Masters of Business Administration from Harvard University. He has also received Honorary Doctor of Laws degrees from both Wilfrid Laurier University and the University of Waterloo.

In 1972, he succeeded his father, Carl A. Pollock, as president of Electrohome, a Kitchener, Ontario-based electronics company founded by his grandfather Arthur Bell Pollock in 1907. Electrohome was widely known as the Canadian equivalent of US companies like General Electric and RCA. Pollock led the company into developing a number of different electronics products, both consumer and industrial, including specialized data displays for the New York Stock Exchange, large-screen projection televisions, reverse osmosis/ultrafiltration systems, and, in the late 1970s and 1980s, custom monitors for many leading video games manufacturers including Atari and Sega. The company also had brief ventures in satellite television receivers and videotex hardware. In 1996, Pollock merged the Electrohome owned CKCO-TV, the first TV station in Kitchener-Waterloo, the company's other broadcasting properties, and holdings in CTV, with Baton Broadcasting. In 1997, Electrohome sold its interest in CTV and all broadcast holdings to Baton for cash and shares worth $270 Million Canadian dollars. Baton changed its name to CTV Television Network a year later, and it has been the top rated Canadian television network since 2002. Under Pollock, Electrohome's most successful products were a line of industrial display projectors that evolved from single CRT monochrome data projectors into stereoscopic virtual reality projectors and digital movie theater projectors, based on the Texas Instruments Digital Light Processing technology. In 1999, Electrohome sold the projection systems division to Christie Digital, a leading film projector manufacturer. Electrohome was eventually dissolved in an orderly wind down in late 2008.

Pollock served on the boards of numerous companies including Thyssenkrupp Budd Canada Inc., Canadian General-Tower Ltd. and S.C. Johnson and Son Ltd. He was also active in many non-profit organizations, serving as a trustee with the Art Gallery of Ontario and as a board member with Cambridge Memorial Hospital, the Grand River Conservation Foundation and Junior Achievement of the Region of Waterloo. He was a member of the Advisory Board of the University of Western Ontario, the board of directors of the University of Waterloo, the Science Council of Canada and the Trillium Foundation of Ontario. He has also served as chairman of the Kitchener-Waterloo Art Gallery and St. John's-Kilmarnock School, a private school serving the Waterloo Region area.

== Personal life and death ==
Pollock and his wife Joyce had four children. He died on January 12, 2026, at the age of 89.
