= Camp Cariboo =

Canadian children's television series

- Genre: Children's
- Directed by: John Matlock and Paul Francescutti
- Presented by: Tom Knowlton; Mark Baldwin
- Opening theme: "The Cariboo Boogie"
- Country of origin: Canada
- No. of seasons: 5

Production
- Producer: Janis Nostbakken
- Production locations: Kitchener, Ontario, Canada

Original release
- Network: CTV
- Release: 1986 – 1989

Camp Cariboo is a Canadian children's television program that aired on several CTV stations from 1986 to 1989. The show is best known for its rerun stint on YTV from September 2, 1989 to August 15, 1997.

== Premise ==
Camp Cariboo grew out of the summer camping experiences of Tom Knowlton and Mark Baldwin, as well as the producer and co-creator Janis Nostbakken and directors John Matlock and Paul Francescutti. The series was produced at CKCO-TV in Kitchener, Ontario, and filmed in part on location in Ontario Camping Association camps. Hosted by Tom and Mark, each show featured real kids along with a variety of short skits, riddles, songs and stories, all portrayed in the setting of a fictional summer camp. Viewers took part by sending in their jokes, riddles and challenges that were shared during mail call time in the camp office.

An audio CD called "I Love Camp Cariboo" has been produced by the Cariboo team and is available on iTunes.

== Main characters ==
Tom and Mark were the main characters of the show. Most episodes featured the two in interactive songs and sketches with kid-campers and in how-tos and comedy bits. Tom and Mark had alter-egos, "The Keeners", a couple of ageless campers so intent on coming back to camp each year that Tom and Mark gave them their moniker. In reality, the clips were in fast motion so that their voices would sound higher. The Keeners appeared in segments sharing camping tips taken to extremes and punctuated by one-liner jokes and groaners. Their popular theme song, I've Got a Head Like a Ping-Pong Ball, became a cult hit and a generation of kids grew up reciting the Cariboo credo: "We'll follow the path where the cariboo walked, Our cariboo headgear is off, on, locked!" The coveted eyes-and-antlers ball caps worn by the Keeners were featured in an exhibit at the Waterloo Region Museum. Another regular character was Uncle Wes (played by Tom) in a segment called "Woodsy Wisdom". Wes would usually make appearances around the camp fire telling old stories and offering camping advice.

== Reception ==
The series was developed in close collaboration with kids from the Kitchener-Toronto region and pilot-tested before the final magazine-show format was decided upon. Positive feedback from audiences and critics on the first series of shows led to production of four more seasons. Camp Cariboo was honoured with four national television awards: two CanPro Gold Awards and two awards from The Children's Broadcast Institute (now Youth Media Alliance YMA).
