= CHWI-DT =

Television station in Wheatley, Ontario

- Wheatley–Windsor, Ontario; Canada
- City: Wheatley, Ontario
- Channels: Digital: 16 (UHF); Virtual: 16
- Branding: CTV2 Windsor; CTV News Windsor

Programming
- Affiliations: 16.1/26.1: CTV2

Ownership
- Owner: Bell Media Inc.
- Sister stations: CKLW, CIMX-FM, CIDR-FM

History
- First air date: October 18, 1993
- Former channel numbers: Analog: 16 (UHF, 1993–2011); Digital: 26 (UHF, 2011–2019)
- Former affiliations: Independent (1993–1998)
- Call sign meaning: Chatham and Windsor

Technical information
- Licensing authority: CRTC
- ERP: CHWI-DT: 3.4 kW; CHWI-DT-60: 0.162 kW
- HAAT: CHWI-DT: 168.2 m (552 ft); CHWI-DT-60: 89 m (292 ft)
- Transmitter coordinates: CHWI-DT: 42°08′33″N 82°26′51″W; CHWI-DT-60: 42°18′58″N 83°2′24″W
- Translator(s): CHWI-DT-60 26.1 (RF 17) Windsor

Links
- Website: CTV2 Windsor

CHWI-DT (channel 16) is a television station licensed to Wheatley, Ontario, Canada, broadcasting CTV2 programming to the Windsor area. Owned and operated by Bell Media, the station has studios at the Bell Canada Building on Goyeau Street in downtown Windsor with a secondary office on Keil Drive South in Chatham; its primary transmitter is located on Zion Road (between Concession Line Roads 4 and 5) in Chatham, with a rebroadcaster atop Victoria Park Place in downtown Windsor.

CHWI was built by Baton Broadcasting in 1993 following its purchase of CFPL-TV in London. Signing on October 18, 1993, it provided Windsor its first dedicated local TV newscasts since 1990, though the newscasts were presented from London. The main transmitter, sited near Wheatley to avoid programming restrictions related to Windsor's proximity with Detroit, was supplemented with a rebroadcaster in downtown Windsor in 1995. As Baton sought to control the CTV Television Network, it traded CHWI-TV and other stations to CHUM Limited in 1997. Beginning the next year, the station was branded The New WI as part of CHUM's NewNet regional system, which mostly consisted of secondary stations in Ontario. Its local newscasts came to dominate the ratings in Windsor, particularly after a 1999 strike at CBC station CBET-TV.

NewNet was renamed A-Channel in 2005 and then A in 2008 after its purchase by CTVglobemedia, predecessor to Bell Media. Citing a difficult economic environment and federal refusal to let TV stations charge cable systems for carriage, CTV declared its intention to shut CHWI-TV down in 2009 but reversed its decision in light of increased federal support and lobbying by local politicians. A was renamed CTV Two in 2011, with its local newscasts coming under the CTV News banner. The station offers weeknight newscasts covering Windsor and Chatham.

== The Baton years ==
In May 1992, Baton Broadcasting agreed to purchase two television stations in southwestern Ontario: CFPL-TV in London and CKNX-TV in Wingham from The Blackburn Group. For Baton, the transaction gave the company additional regional muscle as it sought to compete with the Global Television Network. Three months later, Baton applied to the Canadian Radio-television and Telecommunications Commission (CRTC) to build a third television station, primarily a rebroadcaster of CFPL-TV, near Wheatley to serve Windsor and Chatham. The new Wheatley transmitter, on channel 16, would air up to 6 1/2 hours of locally oriented programming a week, including a local newscast, produced from London for the Windsor–Chatham area. The new station, given the call sign CHWI-TV, would be an affiliate of Baton's regional Ontario Network Television system and carry Toronto Blue Jays baseball. This influenced the decision to set up the main transmitter at Wheatley, which was outside the 80-kilometre (50 mi) protection radius from Detroit where the Detroit Tigers had blackout rights; CBET (channel 9), located in Windsor proper, was affected by the blackout rules.

The news component was the portion that attracted the most interest. Windsor had been without a local television newscast since December 1990, when the Canadian Broadcasting Corporation (CBC) discontinued the local news on CBET. In a letter to the CRTC, Windsor mayor Mike Hurst supported the Baton bid; though he expressed concern over the signal strength that CHWI-TV would provide Windsor from Wheatley, he called it a starting point for the restoration of local television news service. The local programming proposed by Baton included a 6 p.m. newscast on weeknights; a half-hour news and community affairs program in midday; and two weekly public affairs shows.

The CRTC approved the construction of CHWI-TV on January 26, 1993, days after the Wheatley transmitter site was approved by Romney Township officials; Baton promised to have the station operational by January 1994. For the company, it was a return to Windsor; Baton had been forced to sell channel 9, previously private commercial station CKLW-TV, to the CBC in 1975, but held on to the CKLW radio stations until 1985. In spite of the 1994 projections, Baton was able to speed up construction. Transmitter testing began September 1, providing Windsor with a similar picture quality to the Global repeater at Stevenson, and a Grade-A contour in areas such as Chatham and Leamington.

CHWI-TV logo from 1993 to 1994. The trillium symbol was also rolled out at CFPL-TV and CKNX-TV and symbolized the three stations.

CHWI-TV began broadcasting on October 18, 1993. The local newscasts at 6 and 11 p.m., originally titled News Now like that of CFPL-TV, debuted the same day from a separate studio in London. In Windsor, the station had offices at Goyeau Street and Riverside Drive, housing a studio for inserts into the newscasts, and 14 people in the newsroom, plus two more in Chatham. In its first ratings survey, CHWI's News Now came in third, just behind CBET with the news from CKCO in Kitchener. CKCO, which had been the main source of television news coverage about Windsor after the 1990 CBET cuts and maintained a news bureau there, soon cut back its presence in light of the entrance of CHWI, the 1994 relaunch of local news by CBET, and a cooperative ad sales relationship between Baton and the CBC; in late 1995, the news bureau was closed altogether. By late 1994, CHWI was second at 6 p.m. to the CBC Toronto early evening news, and by early 1997 it had almost as many viewers as CBET's 5:30 p.m. Windsor Evening News.

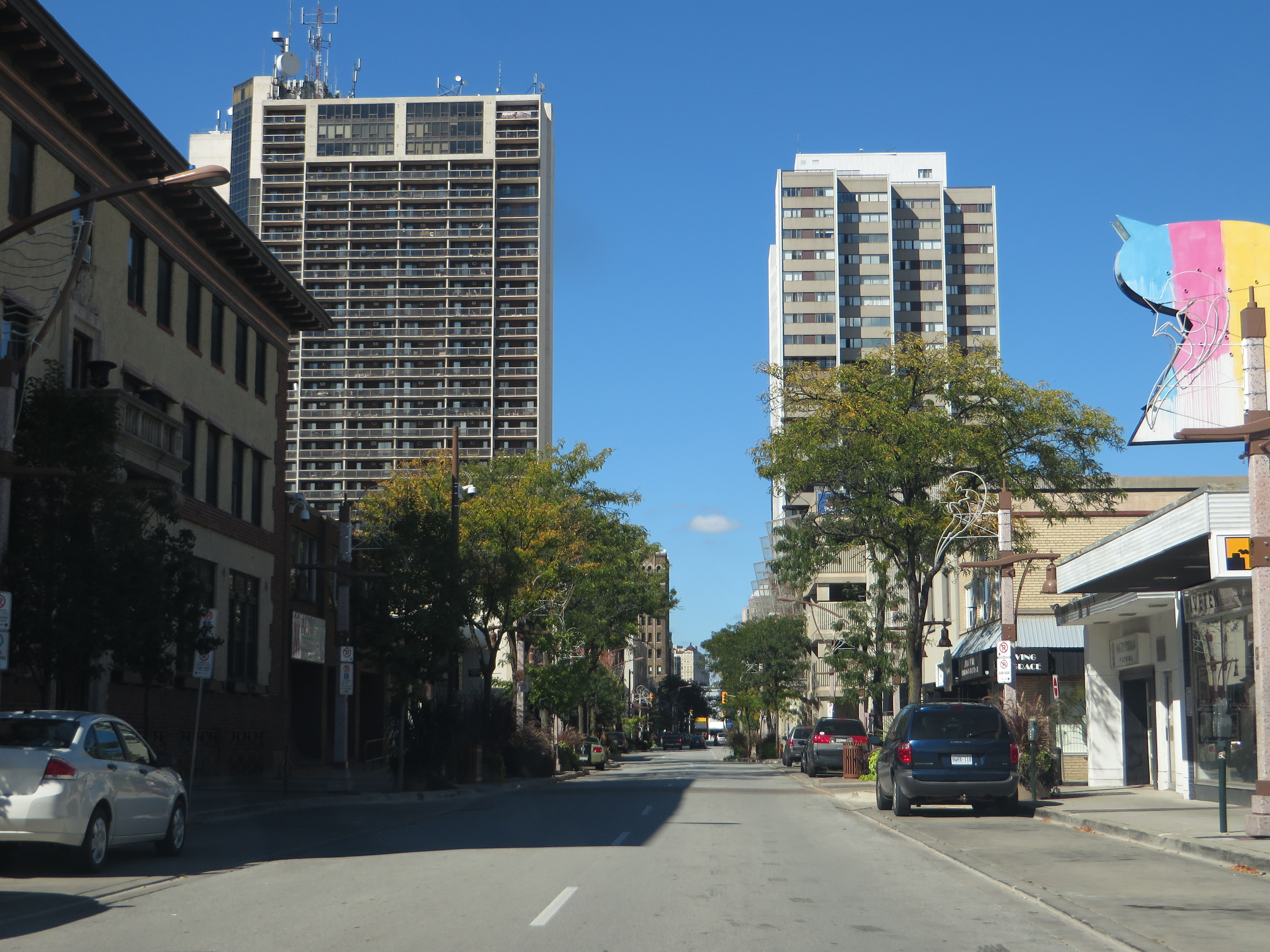
Victoria Park Place (left) has housed CHWI's Windsor retransmitter since 1995.

Reception from the Wheatley transmitter site proved to be an issue in the Windsor city centre, and many television antennas in this area were aimed northwest toward Southfield, Michigan, where most Detroit TV stations have their towers. In August 1994, Baton applied to the CRTC for authority to build a rebroadcaster on channel 6 atop the Victoria Park Place condominium, which already housed the microwave transmission link between Windsor and London. The proposed service was directional toward the southeast to avoid signal coverage in Detroit. The new transmitter went on—using channel 60 instead of 6—on July 26, 1995, providing the core Windsor area with coverage despite an effective radiated power of 580 watts. Later, in 2000, the Windsor transmitter was authorized to increase its power tenfold to 5,800 watts.

In 1997, Baton conducted a round of layoffs at its Ontario stations. Three employees were dismissed at CHWI-TV, while the station lost its shared midday show with CFPL.

== CHUM ownership: The New WI and A-Channel ==
CHWI's logo as "The New WI", used from 1997 to 2005

Through the mid-1990s, Baton Broadcasting worked to consolidate its control of the CTV Television Network. On February 25, 1997, it exchanged television stations with CHUM Limited. With its acquisition of ATV, it gained majority control of CTV. In exchange, CHUM received a series of secondary stations in Ontario that were redundant to the CTV network: CFPL-TV, CKNX-TV, CHWI-TV, and CHRO-TV serving Pembroke and Ottawa. It expected the stations to fit well with CKVR-TV "The New VR" in Barrie as well as with all four private radio stations in Windsor, which it owned. The makeover of CHWI-TV began in September 1997, when CFPL, CKNX, and CHWI adopted CHUM's primetime schedule and began gradually altering their local programming over a two-month period. The 6 p.m. News Now was joined by a new regional 5:30 newscast, First Look, while late night sportscasts were reformatted in a style reminiscent of CHUM-owned Citytv's news. Newscasts were a particular point of emphasis for improvement in the reformatting of the stations. In September 1998, the three stations were rebranded, with CHWI becoming "The New WI" and CHUM promising that someday its newscast would originate from Windsor, not London.

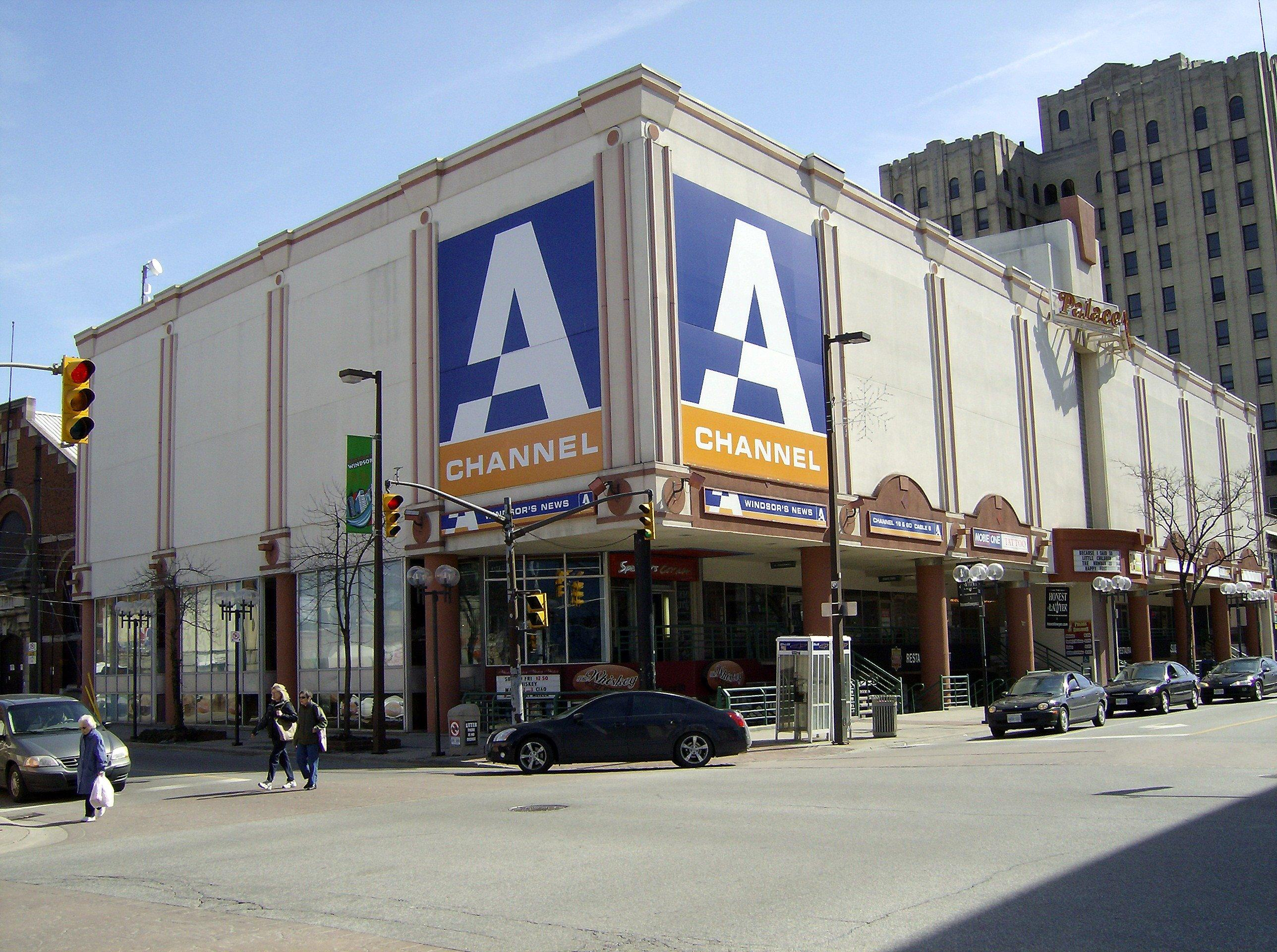
CHWI's downtown studio at Ouellette Avenue (seen here in 2007, after the rebrand to A-Channel) was used from 1999 to 2013.

On September 1, 1999, CHWI relocated from its original studios at Riverside and Goyeau to a higher-visibility downtown location at 300 Ouellette Avenue, occupying a former Laurentian Bank. A month later, it and CFPL debuted a shared morning show, New Day, with roughly half the program originating from Windsor and the other half from London. New Day debuted to an average audience of 500 but grew that to 2,800 within a year.

CBET endured a technician's strike in February and March 1999 and did not have local news for two months; channel 9's audience fell by nearly 40 percent, and CHWI made significant ratings inroads, particularly in Windsor itself, to become southwestern Ontario's most-watched local newscast. Even though CBET moved its local news to 6 p.m. in October 2000 when Canada Now debuted, by 2005 CHWI had twice as many viewers in the same time slot. In June 2003, the news portion of CHWI's newscasts began to originate from Windsor, though weather and sports continued to be presented from London.

As a result of CHUM's acquisition of Craig Media (and its rebranding of a series of stations in Western Canada as Citytv stations on the same day), the NewNet stations (including CHWI-TV) were rebranded as A-Channel in August 2005. This allowed for increased cross-promotion and brand sharing.

== CTV ownership ==
On July 12, 2006, Bell Globemedia (later known as CTVglobemedia and now Bell Media) announced plans to take over CHUM Limited for CA$1.7 billion. On June 8, 2007, the CRTC announced its approval of CTVglobemedia's purchase of CHUM Limited, but the commission added a condition that CTVglobemedia must sell off CHUM's Citytv stations to another buyer while allowing it to retain the A-Channel stations. Speculation of a rebrand for the A-Channel group followed the purchase, and in 2008, the system was renamed A.

=== Closure threat ===
Less than a year after the rebrand, CTV announced its intention to shut down CHWI-TV and CKNX-TV when their licence terms expired at the end of August 2009. Calling them the two smallest A stations, CTVglobemedia leadership cited the impacts of the 2008 financial crisis and the CRTC's decision not to allow a fee-for-carriage policy by which local stations could charge cable systems for the right to provide their signals. Even though both stations were losing money for CTV—in the case of CHWI-TV, it had run deficits for ten years—CTV had been reluctant to shutter the Windsor station because of its strong local news ratings. The news was very poorly received by Windsor viewers; Bruce Demara of The Toronto Star called the decision "puzzling", citing CHWI's news ratings dominance. Local, provincial, and federal politicians representing Windsor, from the Windsor City Council and provincial MPs Sandra Pupatello and Dwight Duncan to federal MPs Brian Masse and Joe Comartin, lobbied CTVglobemedia to keep CHWI on the air, citing the unique circumstances in Windsor television and the predominance of American media in the market.

It appeared for a time that a sale would keep the station on the air. Shaw Communications agreed on April 30, 2009, to buy CHWI-TV, CKNX-TV, and CKX-TV in Brandon, Manitoba, for one dollar each, pending CRTC approval. However, Shaw backed out of the transaction on June 30, 2009—reportedly after reviewing the financial details of the properties to be acquired—once again putting the stations' futures in doubt. On July 6, 2009, the CRTC announced decisions to bolster the availability of local program funding and consider a fee-for-carriage model, prompting CTVglobemedia to "review" its plans for CHWI. Two days later, CTV announced the station would remain on the air for at least another year, making CHWI-TV the only station to fully survive the cuts as CKNX-TV was converted to rebroadcast CFPL-TV.

=== Bell Media era ===
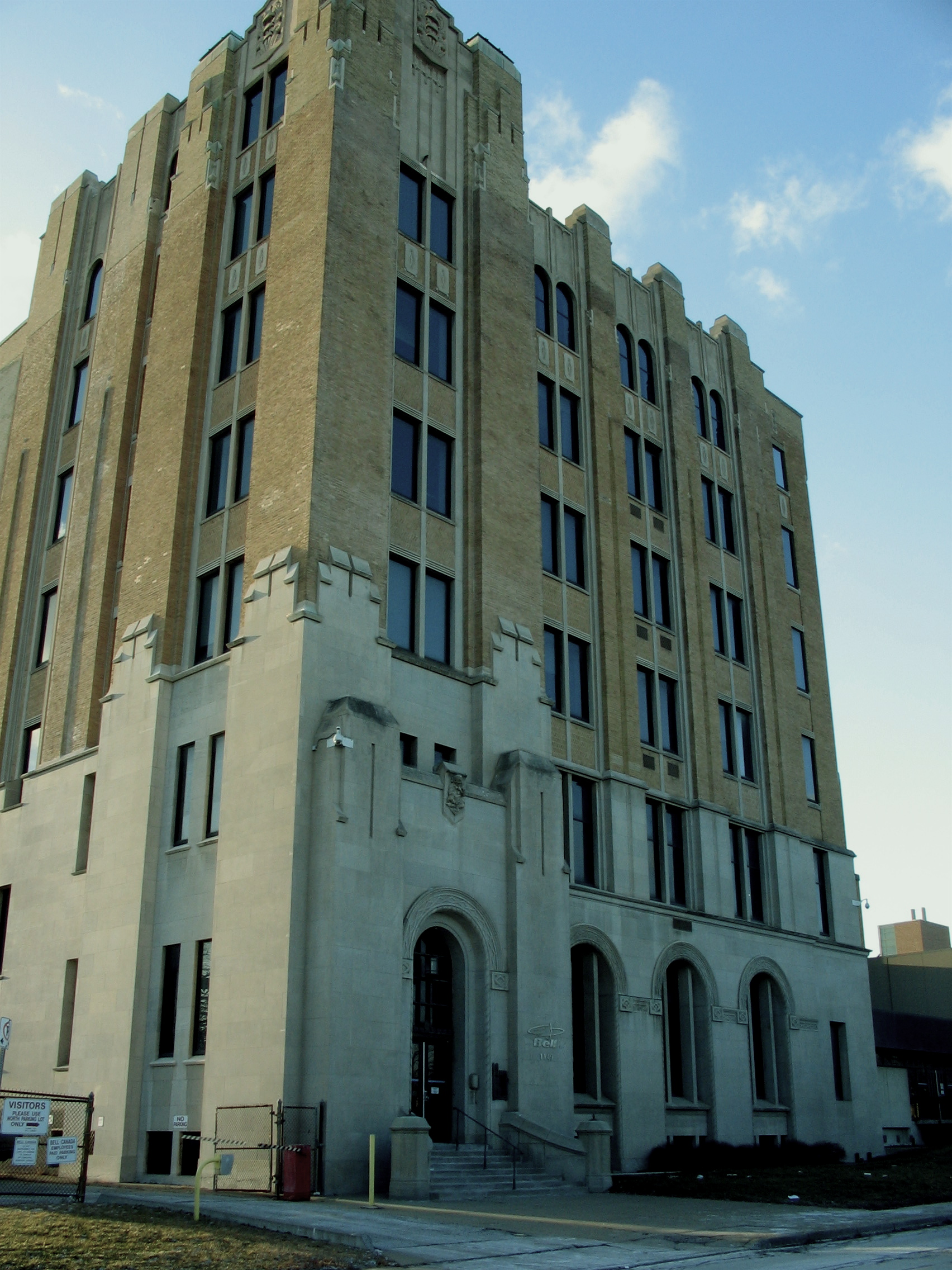
The Bell Canada Building has housed CHWI-DT and its sister radio stations since 2014.

In 2011, Bell Canada acquired full control of CTVglobemedia and restructured the company as Bell Media. One month later, Bell revealed that the A system, including CHWI, would be relaunched as CTV Two beginning with the 2011–12 television season. Alongside the relaunch came the rebranding of CHWI's newscasts as CTV News Windsor and the establishment of a high-definition feed for its new digital signal.

In April 2013, Bell Media announced that the station would move to newly constructed facilities at the Bell Canada Building on Goyeau Street; the move came shortly after the Windsor Star newspaper moved into offices elsewhere in the Ouellette Street structure and increased utilization of the 1923-vintage structure, which had two empty floors. After relocating, CHWI began producing local 6 p.m. weekend newscasts in January 2014, replacing regional newscasts produced by CFPL. These were scrapped in February 2024 as part of a nearly network-wide discontinuation of weekend newscasts.

== Notable on-air staff ==
- Jacqueline Milczarek — reporter
- Catherine Herridge — reporter, 1993–1995

== Technical information ==
Transmitter locations for CHWI-DT and rebroadcaster CHWI-DT-60.; CHWI-DT 16.1 Wheatley, ON (originating station); CHWI-DT-60 26.1 Windsor, ON (rebroadcaster)

CHWI-DT is broadcast from two transmitters: a primary transmitter near Wheatley, Ontario, that covers Chatham-Kent and most of rural Essex County and a rebroadcaster in downtown Windsor.

On August 31, 2011, when Canadian television stations in CRTC-designated mandatory markets transitioned from analog to digital broadcasts, CHWI-TV flash cut its digital signal into operation, using its former UHF analog channels 16 and 26. The Windsor transmitter had just been switched from channel 60 the previous January in order to clear the upper UHF band.

As part of the 600 MHz spectrum auction mandated by the U.S. Federal Communications Commission and Innovation, Science and Economic Development Canada, on April 29, 2019, CHWI-DT-60 moved from channel 26 to channel 17.

Subchannel of CHWI-DT and CHWI-DT-60
| Subchannel | Res. | Short name | Programming |
|---|---|---|---|
| 16.1; 26.1 | 1080i | CHWI | CTV2 |
