= CICS-FM =

Radio station in Sudbury, Ontario

Coordinates: 46°30′14″N 80°58′04″W

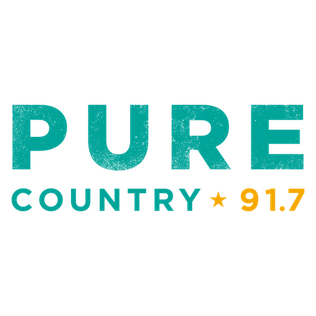
- Sudbury, Ontario; Canada
- Broadcast area: Greater Sudbury
- Frequency: 91.7 MHz
- Branding: Pure Country 91.7

Programming
- Format: Country
- Affiliations: Premiere Networks

Ownership
- Owner: Bell Media; (Bell Media Radio)
- Sister stations: CICI-TV

History
- First air date: August 18, 2008
- Call sign meaning: Play on the word "Kicks" (former branding)

Technical information
- Class: B
- ERP: 50,000 watts
- HAAT: 120.9 metres (397 ft)

Links
- Webcast: Listen Live
- Website: purecountry.ca/sudbury

CICS-FM is a Canadian radio station, which broadcasts at 91.7 FM in Sudbury, Ontario. The station airs a country format, branded as Pure Country 91.7. The studio and offices are located at 699 Frood Road in Sudbury, and the station transmits a 50,000 watt signal from the CBC tower.

== History ==
Originally owned by Larche Communications, the station was licensed by the CRTC on July 12, 2007. The format and KICX 91.7 branding were patterned on Larche's existing CICZ-FM in Midland, although CICZ's format and brand were moved to sister station CICX-FM in Orillia before CICS was launched.

The station began on-air testing periods without audio in late spring 2008, and officially began testing with country music on the morning of July 28. On August 18 at 7 a.m. ET, the station officially launched as KICX 91.7. The KICX-FM morning show hosts Luke and Shannon kicked it off that morning with the song "Play Something Country" by Brooks and Dunn.

On August 10, 2017, Bell Media announced that it would acquire CICS. Bell Media received approval from the CRTC on February 14, 2018.

On May 28, 2019, as part of a country-wide format reorganization by Bell, CICS rebranded as Pure Country 91.7.

In May 2022, CICS-FM moved from its 60 Elm Street studios in downtown Sudbury where it was launched in 2008 to its new location at 699 Frood Road in the CTV Northern Ontario building with television sister station CICI-TV.

== Technical issues ==
CICS-FM may receive some interference from a 100 kW FM signal, WCML-FM in Alpena, Michigan. Although Sudbury is well outside of WCML's normal broadcast range, due to tropospheric ducting over Lake Huron the signal has sometimes reached the Sudbury area strongly enough to be in almost crystal clear FM stereo.

== Former logos ==
Logo used for CICS-FM from 2008 to August 2016
