= CJOS-FM (Saskatchewan) =

Former radio station in Caronport, Saskatchewan

Defunct
- Caronport, Saskatchewan; Canada
- Frequency: 92.7 MHz

Programming
- Format: Christian campus radio

Ownership
- Owner: Briercrest Bible College

History
- First air date: 1995
- Last air date: April 25, 2006

CJOS-FM was a Canadian radio station, which aired at 92.7 FM in Caronport, Saskatchewan. Owned and operated by Briercrest Bible College, the station aired a predominantly Christian campus radio format.

The station launched at 92.7 FM in 1995.

CJOS-FM had license renewals in 2001 and 2005.

On April 25, 2006, CJOS-FM ceased broadcasting and relinquished its license on May 17, 2006.

The CJOS-FM callsign currently belongs to a radio station in Owen Sound, Ontario that was launched in 2010.
