= CICX-FM =

Radio station in Orillia, Ontario

Coordinates: 44°32′03″N 79°39′48″W

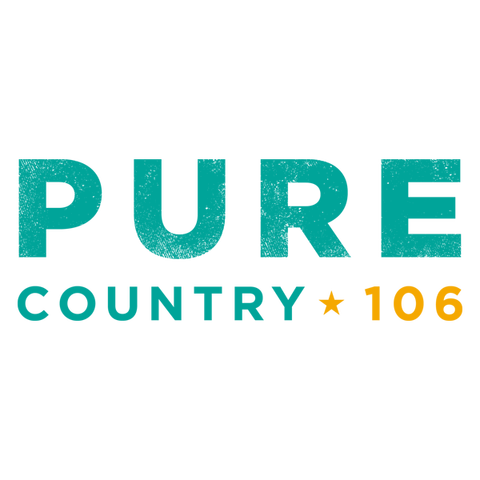
- Orillia, Ontario; Canada
- Broadcast area: Central Ontario
- Frequency: 105.9 MHz
- Branding: Pure Country 106

Programming
- Format: Country
- Affiliations: Premiere Networks

Ownership
- Owner: Bell Media

History
- First air date: 1943
- Former call signs: CFPS (1943–1945); CFOR (1945–1993)
- Former frequencies: 1450 kHz (1943–1954); 1570 kHz (1954–1993)
- Call sign meaning: sounds like "Kicks" (former branding)

Technical information
- Class: B
- ERP: 10,600 watts average 20,000 watts peak
- HAAT: 214 m (702 ft)

Links
- Webcast: Listen Live
- Website: iheartradio.ca/purecountry/central-ontario

CICX-FM (105.9 MHz) is a radio station in Orillia, Ontario. Owned by Bell Media, it broadcasts a country format branded as Pure Country 106. The studio and office is located in Orillia while its transmitter is located near The Horseshoe Valley.

== History ==
The station was originally launched in 1943, broadcasting at 1450 AM in Nobel, with the call sign CFPS. Following the end of World War II, the station's owner, Gordon Ellesworth Smith, wanted to affiliate the station with CBC Radio's Dominion Network, but without a feed line to get CBC programming to the station, this was not possible in Nobel, so in the summer of 1945, the station was shut down and moved to Orillia, where it relaunched on September 3 as 1450 CFOR. The station joined the Dominion Network the following year.

In 1954, the station moved to 1570 AM.

In 1957, a fire destroyed the station's transmitter building, but with help from other broadcasters, the station was back on the air within a day. Later that year, the station increased its signal power to 10,000 watts daytime and 5,000 watts nighttime. Bob Hope, who was in Toronto performing at the Canadian National Exhibition, visited CFOR on September 4 of that year to officially launch the station's new transmitter.

The Dominion Network dissolved in 1962 and the station's affiliation transferred to the main CBC Radio network. In 1964, the station dropped its CBC affiliation, and was sold to a consortium that included Maclean-Hunter. In 1967, Maclean-Hunter became the station's sole owner. In 1976, the station was reacquired by local owners, who in turn sold it to Telemedia in 1980.

In 1993, the station moved to 105.9 MHz, adopting its current call sign and a country format. The former CFOR call letters now belong to an FM radio station in Maniwaki, Quebec. Prior to CFOR's move to 105.9 (as CICX) in 1993, the 105.9 frequency was occupied by a CBC Radio transmitter, known as CBCO, which moved to its current frequency.

In 1996, the station switched to an adult contemporary format using the "EZ Rock" brand.

In 2002, when Telemedia was acquired by Standard Broadcasting, CICX was one of the stations Standard immediately resold to Rogers Communications. With the transaction, Rogers switched the station's branding to 105.9 Lite FM. In August 2003, Rogers switched the station to an adult hits format as Jack FM.

On June 4, 2007, Larche Communications announced a deal with Rogers to acquire CICX in exchange for Larche's existing CIKZ-FM in Waterloo. The transaction, which was approved by the CRTC on December 24, 2007, reunited CICX with its onetime sister station CICZ-FM in nearby Midland.

On March 3, 2008, CICX dropped the Jack FM format and branding, picking up the KICX format from CICZ, and CICZ flipped to a rock format. On May 21, 2008, the station was given approval to change its authorized contours by decreasing the average effective radiated power from 43,000 watts to 10,600 watts, by increasing the effective antenna height and by relocating the antenna.

The station now shares its format and branding with CICS-FM in Sudbury, a station launched by Larche in August 2008.

Former KICX 106 logo

On August 9, 2017, Bell Media announced that it would acquire CICX-FM. Bell Media received approval from the CRTC on February 14, 2018.

On May 28, 2019, the station was renamed Pure Country 106 as part of a nationwide rebranding.
