= CIKZ-FM =

Radio station in Kitchener, Ontario

Coordinates: 43°27′0″N 80°36′7″W

- Kitchener, Ontario; Canada
- Broadcast area: Waterloo Region
- Frequency: 106.7 MHz
- Branding: Country 106.7

Programming
- Format: Country

Ownership
- Owner: Rogers Radio; (Rogers Media, Inc.)
- Sister stations: CHYM-FM

History
- First air date: February 6, 2004
- Former frequencies: 99.5 MHz (2004–2005)
- Call sign meaning: Play on the word "kicks" (former branding)

Technical information
- Class: B1
- ERP: 1,700 watts (5,000 watts maximum)
- HAAT: 200.3 metres (657 ft)

Links
- Website: country1067.com

CIKZ-FM (106.7 MHz) is a commercial radio station in Kitchener, Ontario, Canada. The station airs a country format branded as Country 106.7 and is owned by Rogers Radio, a division of Rogers Sports & Media, which also owns sister stations CHYM-FM and CKGL. CIKZ's studios are at The Boardwalk in Kitchener.

CIKZ has an effective radiated power (ERP) of 1,700 watts (5,000 watts maximum). The transmitter is on Wilby Road near Wilmot Line in Wilmot.

== History ==
CIKZ was licensed to Larche Communications, the station's original owner, by the Canadian Radio-Television and Telecommunications Commission in 2003. It began broadcasting on February 6, 2004, on 99.5 MHz. However, the station later changed to 106.7 MHz in 2005, due to interference from WDCX-FM in Buffalo.

On June 4, 2007, Larche announced a deal to sell CIKZ to Rogers in exchange for CICX-FM in Orillia. The deal, which was approved by the Canadian Radio-television and Telecommunications Commission (CRTC) on December 24, 2007, placed CIKZ in its Kitchener cluster, along with Rogers' existing CKGL and CHYM-FM.

On January 28, 2008, the station modified its on-air identity to reflect the new ownership. This included some of the on-air personalities and its web site, as well as the adjustment of its branding and logo from KICX (the spelling used by Larche) to KIX. Shortly thereafter, Rogers moved the station's studios, previously in Waterloo, to the Rogers facility in downtown Kitchener.

"KIX 106.7" logo used until 2013

On May 30, 2013, the station was rebranded as Country 106.7, as part of Rogers' rebranding of its country-formatted stations to a unified brand.
