= CHYM-FM =

Radio station in Kitchener, Ontario

Coordinates: 43°24′15″N 80°38′04″W

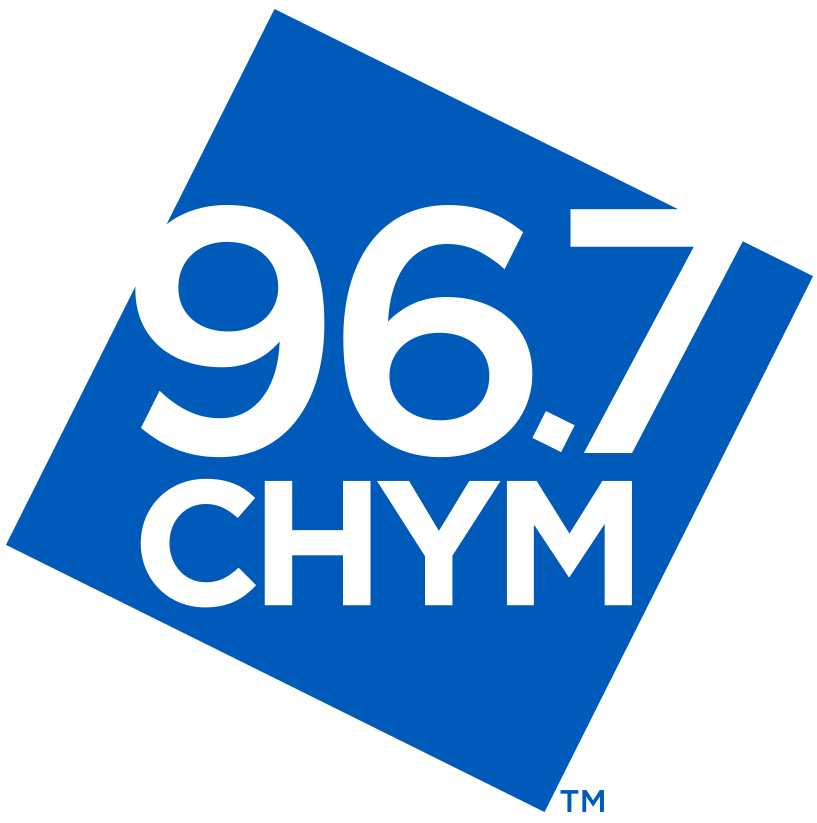
- Kitchener, Ontario; Canada
- Broadcast area: Waterloo Region
- Frequency: 96.7 MHz
- Branding: CHYM 96.7

Programming
- Format: Adult contemporary; Christmas music (Nov-Dec)

Ownership
- Owner: Rogers Radio; (Rogers Media, Inc.)
- Sister stations: CIKZ-FM

History
- First air date: 1929
- Former call signs: CKCR (1929–1965); CHYM (1965–1992)
- Former frequencies: 645 kHz (1929–1934); 1510 kHz (1934–1941); 1490 kHz (1941–1976); 570 kHz (1976–1992)
- Call sign meaning: The word chime

Technical information
- Licensing authority: CRTC
- Class: C1
- ERP: 80,000 watts
- HAAT: 250 metres (820 ft)

Links
- Website: chymfm.com

CHYM-FM (96.7 MHz) is a Canadian radio station in Kitchener, Ontario. The station currently airs an adult contemporary music format using its on-air brand name as CHYM 96.7 and is owned by Rogers Radio, a division of Rogers Sports & Media.

CHYM's studios are at The Boardwalk, while its transmitter is on Baden Hill also known as the Baden Tower, just west of the Kitchener city limits.

== History ==
CHYM-FM logo until 2011

The station was originally launched in 1929 as AM 645 CKCR. The station's frequency moved to 1510 in 1934. In 1949, FM sister station CKCR-FM was launched.

The stations were affiliates of CBC Radio until 1966 and with CBC's Dominion Network from 1949 until 1960.

In 1965, the stations were acquired by Great Lakes Broadcasting, a consortium that included Maclean-Hunter. Both stations changed their callsigns to CHYM (pronounced as "chime") that year. In 1972, the FM outlet's callsign was changed again, to CKGL (evidently for "Kitchener, Great Lakes").

In 1982, Maclean-Hunter took over full ownership of the stations.

The CHYM and CKGL intellectual units (call signs, branding, and programming, but not the licences themselves) swapped frequencies on September 4, 1992, at 8:00 a.m., with CHYM moving to the FM band. (CRTC approval was required, but only as a format swap between the existing stations at 570 and 96.7 as required under the regulations at the time, not a formal exchange of frequencies) The stations became part of Rogers in 1994 when that company acquired Maclean-Hunter.

In 2011, CHYM slightly changed its branding from 96.7 CHYM FM to CHYM 96.7. The station also changed its slogan from "Today's Lite Rock" to "Today's Best Music".

In the summer 2016, Rogers relocated the studios of CHYM, CIKZ-FM and CKGL to "The Boardwalk" near Ira Needles Boulevard and University Avenue. Prior to the move, their studios were located at 305 King Street West in Downtown Kitchener.
