= Carl Pollock =

Canadian businessman (1903–1978)

- Born: 16 September 1903; Berlin, Ontario
- Died: 16 August 1978 (aged 74); Bracebridge, Ontario
- Education: University of Toronto (BSc '26); Oxford University
- Spouse: Helen Isabel Chestnut (m. 1929)

Carl Arthur Pollock OC (16 September 1903 – 16 August 1978) was a Canadian businessman. Born in Kitchener, Ontario, graduated from the University of Toronto in electrical engineering. A scholarship from the Massey Foundation financed two years at Oxford University, England. At university he showed exceptional talent in track and rowing.

He taught for a short time at the University of Toronto, but his father's illness led him to choose a career in business and industry at the Kitchener electronics firm his father founded in 1907, Electrohome. Pollock joined the firm in 1930, was president from 1951 to 1972, and oversaw the most successful years of Electrohome's history. During the decades to follow, Electrohome produced many different consumer products, including furniture, electric motors, small appliances, and most importantly, radios and televisions. By 1965, Electrohome products were being sold in 23 countries. Total sales in 1968 were $44.5 million. By end of the decade, Electrohome was the second largest employer in the Kitchener-Waterloo area, and colour television was the company's largest single product line. In fact, Electrohome engineered, designed, and manufactured the only Canadian colour television receiver.

He was also the founder of several media outlets in Kitchener, including CKKW, CFCA and CKCO.

Pollock was a member of the National Design Council and in 1963 he became president of the Canadian Manufacturers' Association. He was convinced that Canadian technology and industry would take no second place. His own firm led in introducing several firsts in the electronics field.

In 1975, he was made an Officer of the Order of Canada "for his many services to industry, particularly in the field of electronics and for a variety of community activities." He was a founder of the University of Waterloo, chairperson of the board of governors for eleven years and chancellor from 1975 to 1978. He was a founder of the Stratford Festival of Canada and supported musical groups, including the Kitchener-Waterloo Symphony Orchestra.

His son John A. Pollock took over the role of 3rd generation president of Electrohome in 1972, and led the company into a number of different electronics businesses, primarily industrial. The most successful products during this period was a line of data, video, and graphics projectors. Electrohome eventually was dissolved in an orderly wind down in late 2008.

At University of Waterloo, the engineering building CPH (Carl Pollock Hall) is named after him.

== See also ==
- List of University of Waterloo people

Academic offices
Preceded by Ira G. Needles	Chancellor of the University of Waterloo; 1975–1978	Succeeded by Josef Kates
