= Kitchener–Waterloo Oktoberfest =

Annual nine-day festival in Kitchener–Waterloo, Ontario

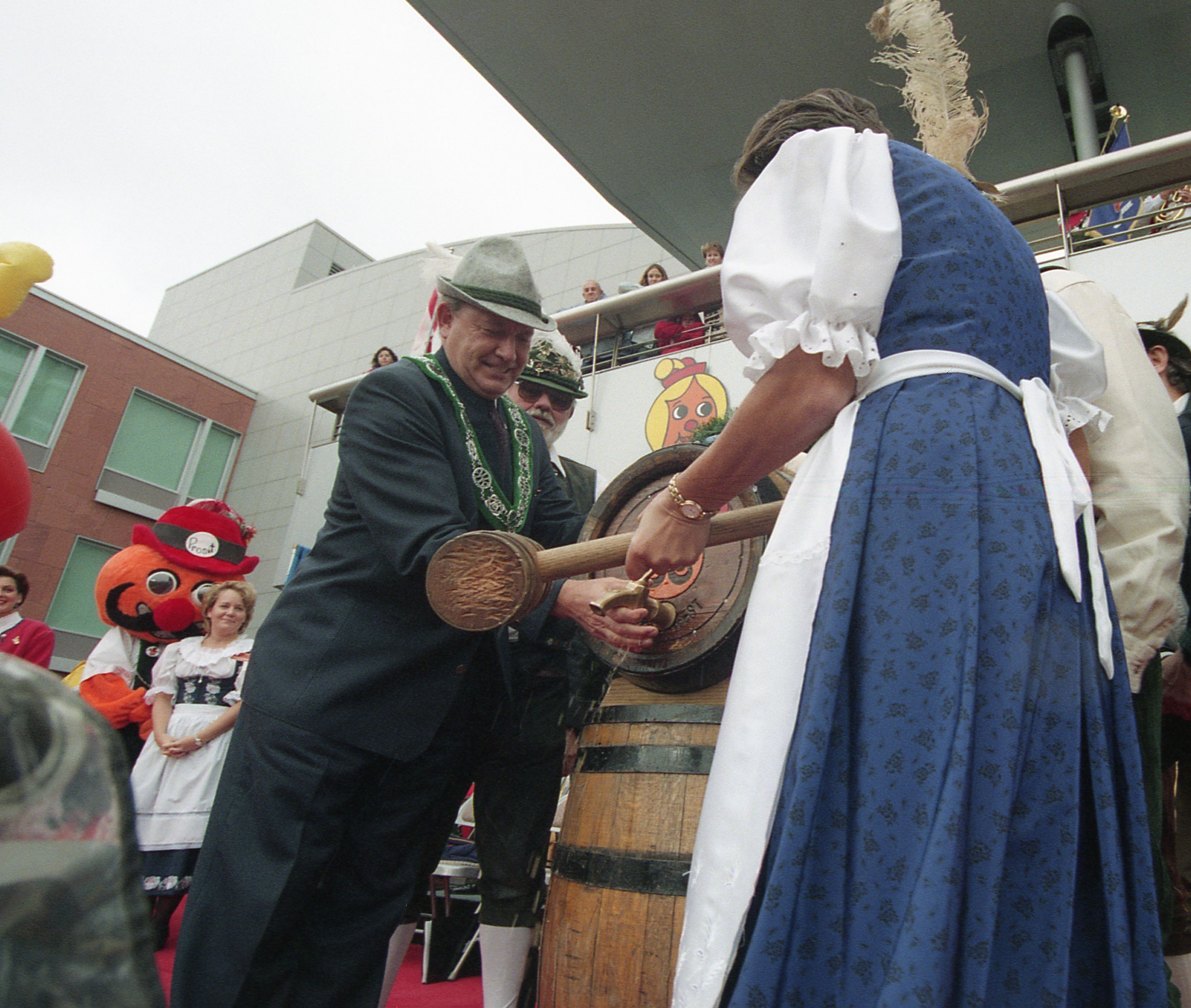
- Elizabeth Witmer MPP taps keg to open Oktoberfest (October 11, 1996)
- Frequency: Annually, surrounding Canadian Thanksgiving
- Locations: Kitchener–Waterloo, Ontario
- Country: Canada
- Years active: 57
- Inaugurated: October 14, 1969
- Attendance: 700,000
- Website: www.oktoberfest.ca

Kitchener–Waterloo Oktoberfest is a festival in the twin cities of Kitchener–Waterloo, Ontario, Canada. Based on the original German Oktoberfest, it is billed as Canada's Greatest Bavarian Festival, and one of the largest Oktoberfests in the world. It is held every October, starting on the Friday before Canadian Thanksgiving and running until the Saturday after. Estimates indicate that the event attracts roughly 700,000 visitors to Waterloo Region, Ontario every year.

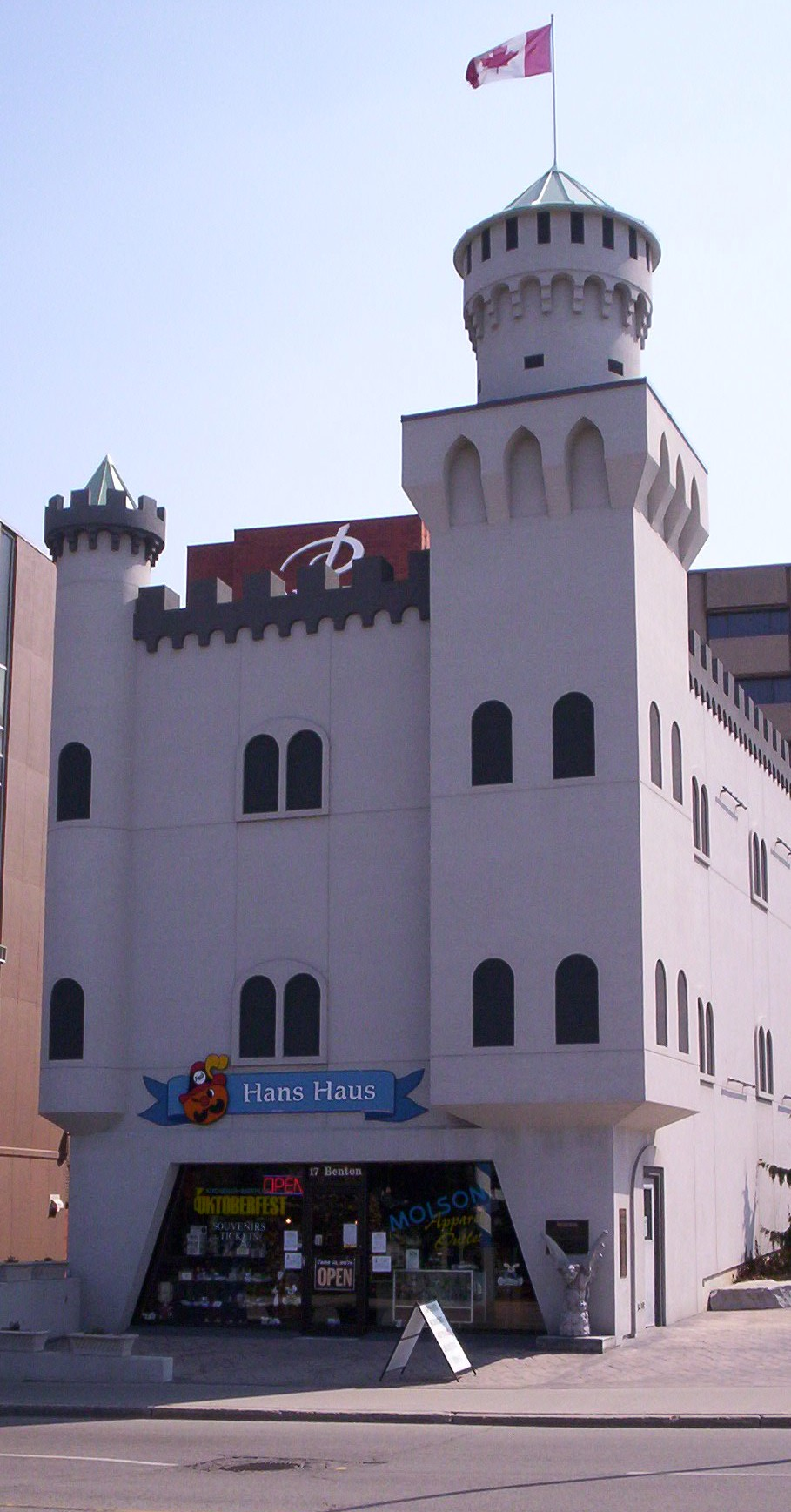
Former Administrative building and gift shop

While its best-known draws are the beer-based celebrations, other cultural and entertainment attractions also fill the week. The most well known is the parade held on Thanksgiving Day; as the only major parade on Canadian Thanksgiving, it is televised throughout Canada and portions of the northern United States on CTV. During the 2016 Oktoberfest parade, an estimated 150,000 people lined the streets along the route.

The twin cities and the surrounding areas of Waterloo Region have a long history of German roots; Kitchener was formerly named Berlin. Many of the Canadians of German ethnicity reside in or near these municipalities. Many still speak German as well. A common phrase at the celebrations is Gemütlichkeit, German for congeniality, or warm friendliness. This word is even programmed into the bus route displays, so during Oktoberfest it will show the route and Gemütlichkeit, or Willkommen.

The festival's mascot is Onkel Hans, a rotund man in Bavarian dress with a thick moustache, lederhosen, and a traditional felt hat with tassel. His graphical image shows him holding a beer stein in one hand, and a sausage (in a roll) in the other. A lesser-known icon is his counterpart Tante Frieda, a similarly stout woman wearing a dirndl.

Another icon of the festival is Miss Oktoberfest. This position was formerly selected in a televised beauty pageant, the applicant coming from across Waterloo Region. The position is now selected by a closed committee of judges from a panel of local applicants; community involvement and personal character form the main criteria under the new system.

== History ==
=== The Early Years: 1967-1969 ===
In 1967, communities across Canada celebrated their Centennial Anniversary with a variety of festivals. The federal government provided funding for these events, including Expo’67 in Montreal. Kitchener-Waterloo was no different in its quest to hold a public event that would increase tourism to the area. Starting in 1967, the community tried a total of three different events as it looked for a more permanent festival. Between the years 1967–1969, the region tested events such as a Heritage Festival, Winterfest and Oktoberfest. The success of each event was monitored and evaluated as they decided what festival would be used going forward. Due to unstable weather patterns, people planning Winterfest found this event to be unreliable and it was quickly removed from the list. The Heritage Festival was removed from the list as too many communities had this event, the region was looking for an event that made them stand out.

The first Oktoberfest event took place in 1967 with events held from October 11 to 14th. Festivities took place at the Concordia Club in Kitchener and drew a crowd of 2,000 people. The event included opening ceremonies with a keg-tapping, dancing, food and beer. In 1969, Kitchener Chamber of Commerce requested that Concordia Club allow the city to run the event for that year on a trial basis. Although the event only turned a profit of $703.73, Oktoberfest was selected as the ongoing event as it showed great potential for future events.

Another long-standing tradition that started in 1967 was that Oktoberfest would be a benefit to the community. In 1967, the first donation of $3,200 was donated to Big Brothers of Waterloo Region. In recent years Oktoberfest does a variety of fundraising for various causes.

=== Kitchener - Waterloo Oktoberfest Inc: 1970 ===
On December 29, 1970, K-W Oktoberfest Inc. was formed switching control of the festival from the city of Kitchener and Waterloo, to a private business to ensure the success of the event. The objectives for this board was simple. First, to evolve the event into something that supported the community and its values. Secondly, to increase tourism to Kitchener, Waterloo and the surrounding area.

The First Board of Directors: Archie Gillies, Barry Bernstein, Lawrence Bingeman, P. Hubert, Jonas Bingeman, Herb Schneider, Jack Bishop, Bob Wagner, Darwin Clay, Mike Walters, Werner Metzger, Mike Hoesch, Dick Hermansen, Paul Weiner, Richard Nausser, Fred Ryan, Carl Hesse, Bryce Ruhnke, Owen Lackenbauer, Norman Schneider and J.R Zuber.

Original Objectives in 1970: the following list is from

- To promote, support, co-ordinate and project the festival of Oktoberfest within the cities of Kitchener and Waterloo and the surrounding area during the month of October.
- To unite all organizations, ethnic clubs, institutions and professions in the Kitchener-Waterloo area in the promotion of Oktoberfest.
- To manufacture, import, buy, sell, license and develop wares, goods, articles and symbols that are required in the advancement, celebration and promotion of Oktoberfest.
- To conduct contests and competitions in the various sports and other activities during the celebration of Oktoberfest.
- To conduct and promote a beauty pageant for the title of “Miss Oktoberfest”
- To bring the attention of the general public to the culture, history, background and origin of the German people residing in the Kitchener-Waterloo area. To promote tourism and to advance and secure the interest in the community and to preserve an accurate history, background and development of the community.
- To promote good will and understanding in the spirit of fellowship and brotherhood of all inhabitants of the Kitchener-Waterloo area.
- To provide improved opportunities and facilities in the Kitchener-Waterloo area for the purpose of celebrating Oktoberfest and to ensure that high standards are maintained and to acquire, purchase, lease lands and buildings for such purposes.
- To do all such things as are incidental or conductive to the attainment of the above objects and to encourage the inhabitants, visitors and guest to participate in the spirit and intent of Oktoberfest.

=== Oktoberfest Controversy Since 1967 ===
1970 Annual Poster: The 1970 event poster, or “The Million Dollar Poster” as it is now known, became the centre of attention during the 1970 festival. LLBO commissioner Mackey ordered posters removed from public streets and declared that they could only be posted in drinking establishments. The issue was that the posters featured the word ‘beer’ and included a picture of a woman holding mugs of frothy beer. Although this was promotional advertising for the event, it was seen as advertising promoting drinking. Event organizers at the time had been worried that the lack of advertising would have a negative effect on the festival. Due to national coverage of the story about the posters, it increased knowledge of the event.

1971-1972 Glenbriar Incident: During the 1971 festival it was expected that there would be a net profit of $84,700, leaving the festival with a surplus budget of $8,745.67. The expected profit included an assumption that the Heidelberg Haus would bring in a surplus of $7,000 based on the previous year's performance. As the event closed and the accounting began, it became obvious that something was wrong, as the event was showing an operating loss of $17,704. The issue was traced back to underperformance at the Heidelberg Haus that showed a $7,000 loss instead of a profit. The issue became worse for K-W Oktoberfest when their office's lease was canceled due to financial reasons. This was quickly solved as Waterloo Town Square offered office space to the organizers.

The financial issue was solved in the spring of 1972. The 4 German clubs and Bingeman Park Farms all contributed an additional $4,000 each to bring the event into a financial surplus for the 1971 event. The money was charged bank interest rates and also required K-W Oktoberfest to complete an audit of Heilberg Haus to understand what went wrong.

1974 Opening Ceremonies: In 1974 there was controversy surrounding the keg-tapping, related to what permission was required and who was able to give it to them. Kitchener Mayor Sid McLennan and Regional Chair Jack Young proceeding with the keg-tapping without issue. In 1975, the event was canceled due to a new law put in place by the Liquor Board. A new law was in place for the 1976 festival and the event once again signaled the start of Oktoberfest. 1975 was the only year in Oktoberfest history that the keg-tapping did not signal the start of the event.

2019 Reset Needed for Oktoberfest :2019-2020 President Tim Beckett stated that the festival was in need of a reset. Beckett felt that a reset was needed to ensure the success of Oktoberfest for another 50 years. Beckett stated that the event needs to return to a destination festival. Beckett would like to see the event attract people not just locally, however, at a national and international level.

2020 Virtual Oktoberfest: Live concerts were scrapped caused by the COVID-19 pandemic, so virtual concerts were held in their place.

=== Oktoberfest President Since 1967 ===
- 1969-1971 - Darwin Clay
- 1972-1976 - Jack Bishop
- 1977-1978 - Charles E. Greb
- 1979-1980 - Bill Stewart
- 1981-1982 - William E. Renaud
- 1983-1984 - William Henderson
- 1985-1986 - Jack Peterson
- 1987-1988 - Guenter Jessat
- 1989-1990 - Carol Sherban
- 1991-1992 - Glen Walker
- 1993-1994 - Donald Nurse
- 1995-1996 - Don Craig
- 1997-1998 - Peter Eichinger
- 1999-2000 - August Sherban
- 2001-2002 - Lois Peterson
- 2003-2004 - Don Willcox
- 2005-2006 - Henning Grumme
- 2007-2008 - Mark Kreller
- 2009-2010 - Paul Buttinger
- 2011-2012 - Vic Degutis
- 2013-2014 - Harry Vogt
- 2015-2016 - Alfred Lowrick
- 2017-2018 - Margo Jones
- 2019-2020 - Tim Beckett
- 2021-2024 - Allan Cayenne

== Clubs and Festhalls ==
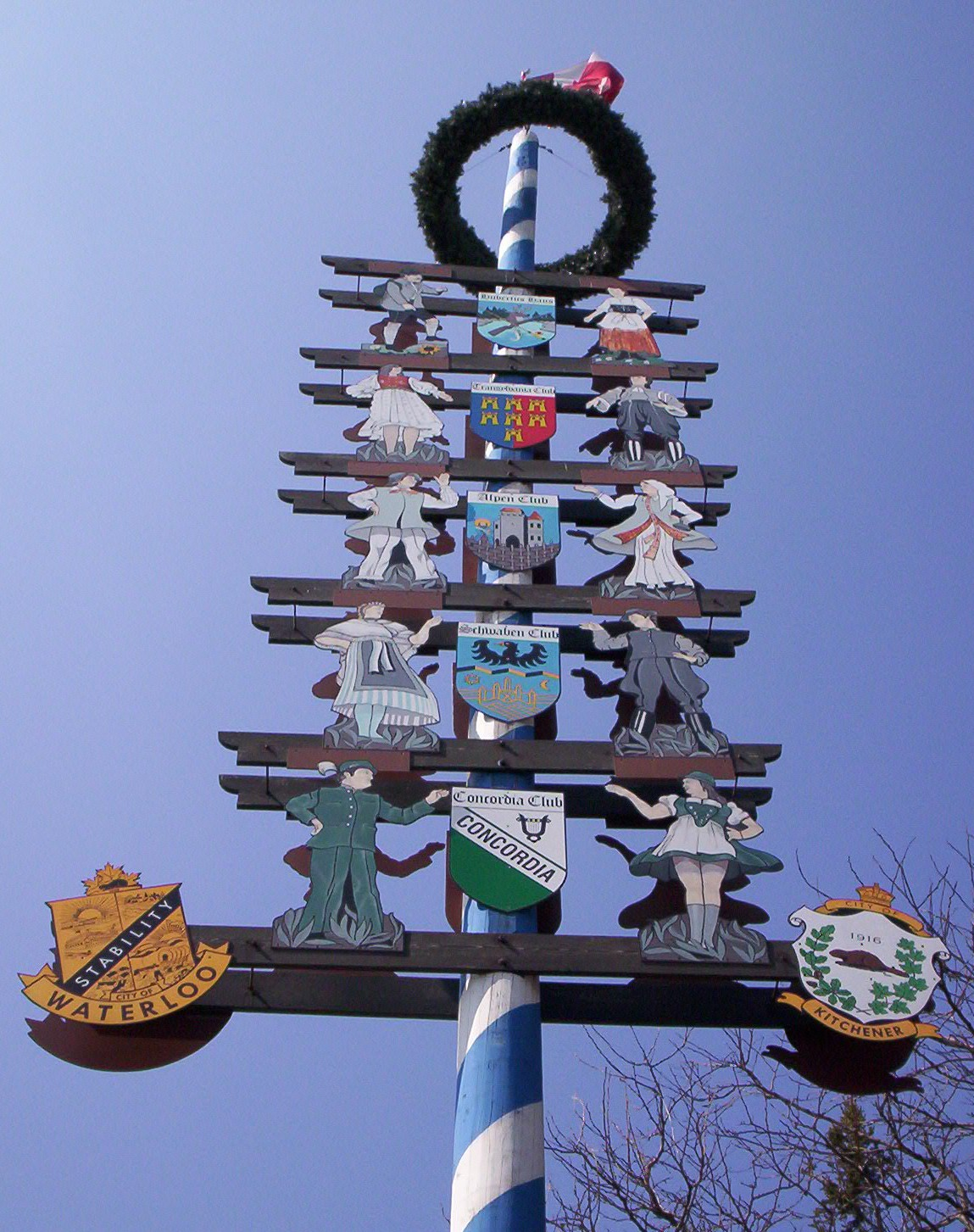
A maypole depicting the crests of the German clubs was designed and painted by Kitchener artist Otto Werner.

Many celebrations in the festival take place in Festhallen; these venues serve beer (Molson Coors Brewing Company is the exclusive corporate sponsor) and traditional foods, and host traditional dancing and music, particularly polkas. The major festhalls are operated by the German clubs based in the cities:

- The Alpine Club of Kitchener.
- The Concordia Club of Kitchener, the largest ethnic German club in Canada.
- Hubertushaus, operated by the German–Canadian Hunting & Fishing Club of Mannheim.
- The Schwaben Club of Kitchener.
- The Transylvania Club of Kitchener.

Other festhalls and biergartens are operated out of existing bars, clubs, and other venues in the cities, which take on Germanic names (such as Karlsberghaus, Altes Muenchen Haus, and Ruedesheimer Garten) for the festival events. In 2010, festhalls opened for the first time in Cambridge and Elmira.

== Events ==
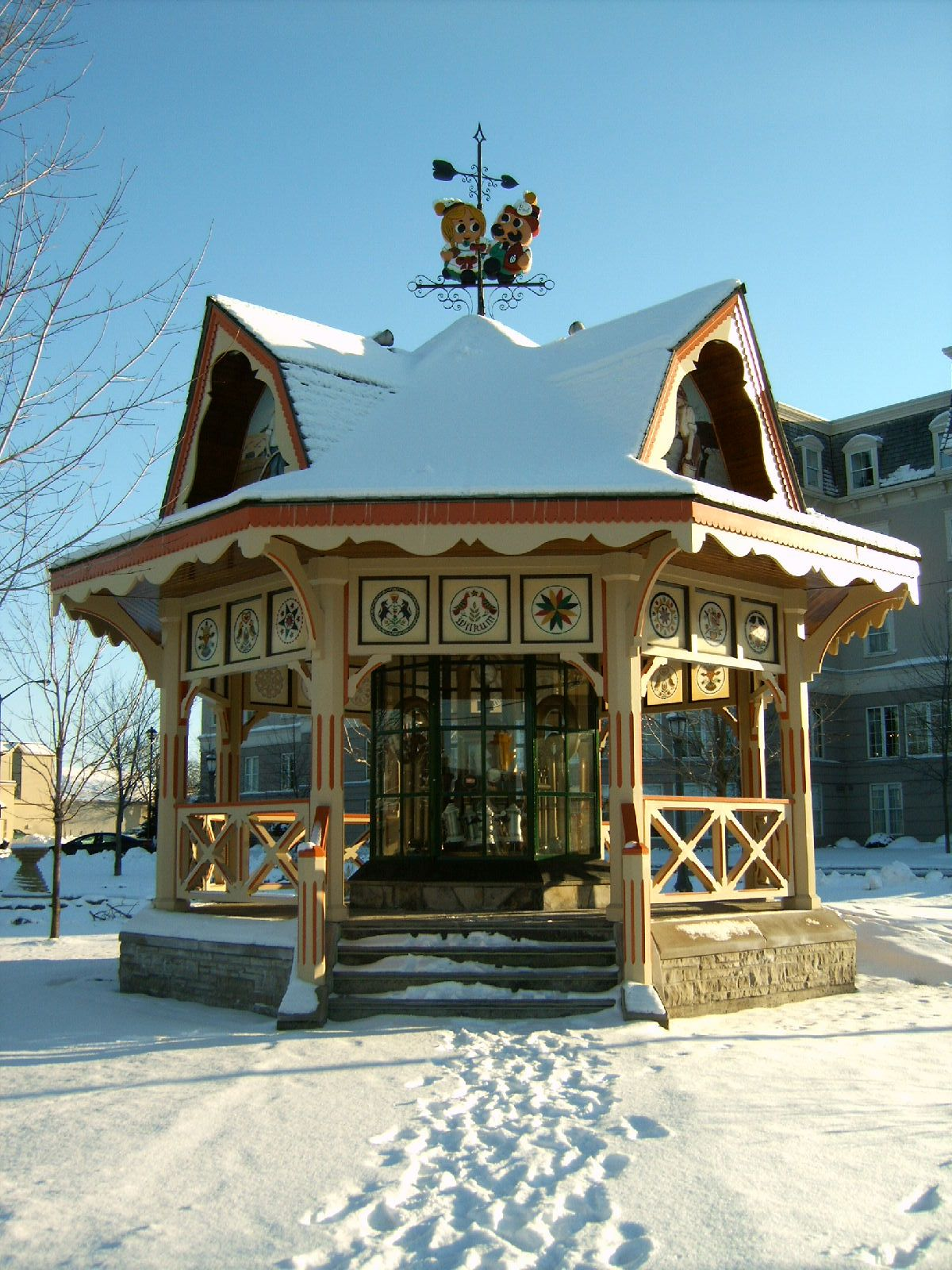
The Oktoberfest Timeteller, a traditional display in Waterloo. Based on traditional Pennsylvania Dutch and local Mennonite Hex designs, the 24 Hex symbols under the eaves of the Timeteller were designed and painted by Kitchener artist Otto Werner.

Nightly ticketed events take place at festhalls across the region based on the traditional concept of Oktoberfest. Throughout the week the following single events take place and have become an important part of the overall festival.

=== Opening ceremonies ===
These include an official keg-tapping to start the festival; at Wilkommen Platz, downtown Kitchener (before 2019 at Kitchener City Hall) (Friday)

=== Pancake breakfast ===
Free breakfast for all comers, in Uptown Waterloo (Saturday)

=== Barrel Race ===
Keg-rolling race in Uptown (Saturday)

=== Oktoberfest 5K Fun Run ===
A family oriented Turkey Trot down the parade route right before the Thanksgiving Day parade. (Monday)

=== Oktoberfest Parade ===
Including bands, traditional dancers, floats and revelry, down King Street in both cities; broadcast nationally by CTV (Thanksgiving Monday) and local radio coverage is provided by CKGL.

During the 2016 Oktoberfest parade, an estimated 150,000 people lined the streets along the route.

=== Miss Oktoberfest ===
The Miss Oktoberfest Pageant started in 1969 and was held at the German Club in Kitchener. The first year the winner took part in local festivities. (cite 40, 36) In 1970, the format was changed, and the winner of Miss Oktoberfest would then compete for Miss Canada. In 1971, the winner of Miss Oktoberfest Donna Sawicky, went on to win Miss Canada. Sending Miss Oktoberfest on to Miss Canada Pageant increased national knowledge of K-W Oktoberfest.

In 2003, Miss Oktoberfest Pageant was cancelled due to the cost of hotels and flights. The same year, The Miss Oktoberfest Ball started with the criteria of participants being from an 80 kilometres (49.7 mi) radius. Miss Oktoberfest is now selected by a panel, selection criteria are based on community involvement and other activities.

For the first time in 17 years, no pageant is planned in 2020. This time the pandemic was the cause.

=== Festhall Single Night Events ===
- University Nights – a night for local University students run by the local Sigma Chi fraternities. Buses run all night from University Avenue in Waterloo to the Kitchener Memorial Auditorium, where the event takes place. Traditionally, Wilfrid Laurier University's night is on Thursday and University of Waterloo's is on the Friday of the second weekend, however both nights attract students from both schools, as well as other nearby colleges.
- Rocktoberfest – major concert featuring rock acts, as well as more traditional music; Queensmount Arena (Altes Muenchen Haus), Kitchener (Sunday)

== Relevance ==
Although it is marketed as a German festival, some do not consider Oktoberfest to be indicative of German culture in general. "The fact is, Oktoberfest in Germany is a very localized festival. It really is a Munich festival. ... [Oktoberfest in Kitchener] celebrates only a "tiny aspect" of German culture [Bavarian]", according to German studies professor James Skidmore of the University of Waterloo.

== See also ==
- Beer festival
