= Electrohome =

Canadian electronics company (1933–2009)

- Formerly: Dominion Electrohome Industries, Limited (1933–1967)
- Industry: Electronics
- Founded: 1 April 1933
- Defunct: 20 May 2009
- Fate: Sold off in parts
- Headquarters: 809 Wellington Street North, Kitchener, Ontario

Electrohome Limited was Canada's largest manufacturer of television sets (TVs) from 1949 to 1987. The company was also involved in television broadcasting, and was a leader in data, video, graphics displays and projectors.

From 1984 to 1999, Electrohome-branded TVs were produced under licence by Mitsubishi Electric, and from 1999 to 2007 by Jutan (distributed by Canadian distributor Citizen Electronics).

The company underwent an orderly wind-up in late 2008. In February 2010, the Electrohome brand was acquired by Bluetronics Group a division of Circus World Displays Limited (CWD).

== History ==
In 1907, Arthur Bell Pollock founded Pollock Manufacturing Co. Ltd., after winning a coin flip with his wife. The Kitchener, Ontario company manufactured the first phonographs in Canada. In the 1920s and 30s the company branched out into other consumer goods such as records, radios, furniture, and was the largest Canadian maker of electric fans. In 1933 the company name became Dominion Electrohome Industries Ltd. and the Electrohome brand was introduced for products ranging from heaters to food mixers.

With the outbreak of World War II, however, everything changed. Electrohome devoted 99% of its production to the war effort. It manufactured wooden aircraft elements including wings, munitions components, and communications equipment, including a radio transmitter for the Royal Canadian Air Force. After the war, Electrohome ranked as a nationally known and important company with 1,400 employees geared to meet the demands of the post-war economy. The war enabled the company to acquire new equipment, more production capacity and a wider range of skills. There was also a perception that Electrohome could be a major player on the Canadian national electronics scene.

The company began manufacturing and selling television sets in 1949, competing with companies such as Northern Electric and Canadian General Electric for a share of the Canadian market. Electrohome developed its reputation with large console model TV sets made with real hardwood cases.

In 1954, Carl Arthur Pollock, son of the company's founder, led Electrohome in joining the Famous Players theatre chain to launch Kitchener-Waterloo's first television station, CKCO-TV, as a CBC Television affiliate. It joined CTV in 1964. Electrohome assumed full control of CKCO in 1970 when broadcasting laws substantially reduced the amount of foreign ownership in Canadian media (Famous Players was controlled by Paramount Pictures).

In the 1960s, Electrohome continued to manufacture consumer products including organs, radios, console stereos, speakers, high fidelity tube amplifiers, and televisions, as it became the first Canadian company to make colour television sets. By 1965, Electrohome products were being sold in 23 countries. Total sales in 1968 were $44.5 million. Over the years the company had ten manufacturing plants and two administrative offices in the Kitchener-Waterloo area.

In 1972, John A. Pollock, grandson of the company founder, became the third generation president of Electrohome. By this time Electrohome was widely known as the Canadian equivalent of US companies like General Electric or RCA. Pollock led the company into a number of different electronics ventures and products, both consumer and industrial. Electrohome's most successful products during this period were a line of display projectors that evolved from single CRT monochrome data projectors into stereoscopic virtual reality projectors and digital movie theater projectors, based on the Texas Instruments Digital Light Processing technology.

In 1984, suffering from years of competition with Sony and other Japanese television makers, Electrohome ceased production of TV sets, and licensed the brand name to Mitsubishi Electric. In 1988, Electrohome purchased a second television station, CFRN-TV in Edmonton.

In 1995, Electrohome and Baton Broadcasting entered a partnership, sharing ownership of CKCO, CFRN, CFCN-TV in Calgary, CFPL-TV in London, CHWI-TV in Wheatley and CKNX-TV in Wingham. The following year, the partnership was reorganized: Baton took over full ownership of all of the stations – and with it, controlling interest in CTV. In return, Electrohome received cash and shares in Baton worth $270 Million Canadian, which changed its name to CTV Inc. a year later. Since 2002 CTV has been the top rated Canadian TV network.

In 1999, Electrohome sold the projection systems division to Christie Digital, a leading film projector manufacturer.

In 1999, Electrohome switched licensees, dropping Mitsubishi Electric and allowing Canadian distributor Citizen Electronics (Jutan) to market TVs and DVD players under the Electrohome brand name.

On March 5, 2007, the Redmond Group of Companies announced the purchase of Electrohome brands effective January 1, 2008. Later that month, on March 27, Synnex announced the purchase of the Redmond Group Electrohome assets.

In January 2008, Electrohome announced the sale of all of its trademarks to Synnex Corporation. Electrohome now derived most of its income from its licensing, minor stock holdings in Mechdyne/Fakespace Systems which provides visualization solutions for data analysis, and owns digital cinema firm Immersion Studios.

The company began an orderly wind-up in late 2008. In February 2010, the Electrohome brand was acquired by Bluetronics Group, a division of Circus World Displays Limited (CWD). Also included in the purchase were the rights to Magnasonic, Secureguard and Citizen (Canada only) brands, amongst many others. Based in Niagara Falls, Canada, CWD also owns and operates other brands including Fluance, Nyrius, Levana, SVAT, Defender and Pure Therapy.

== Plant 4 ==
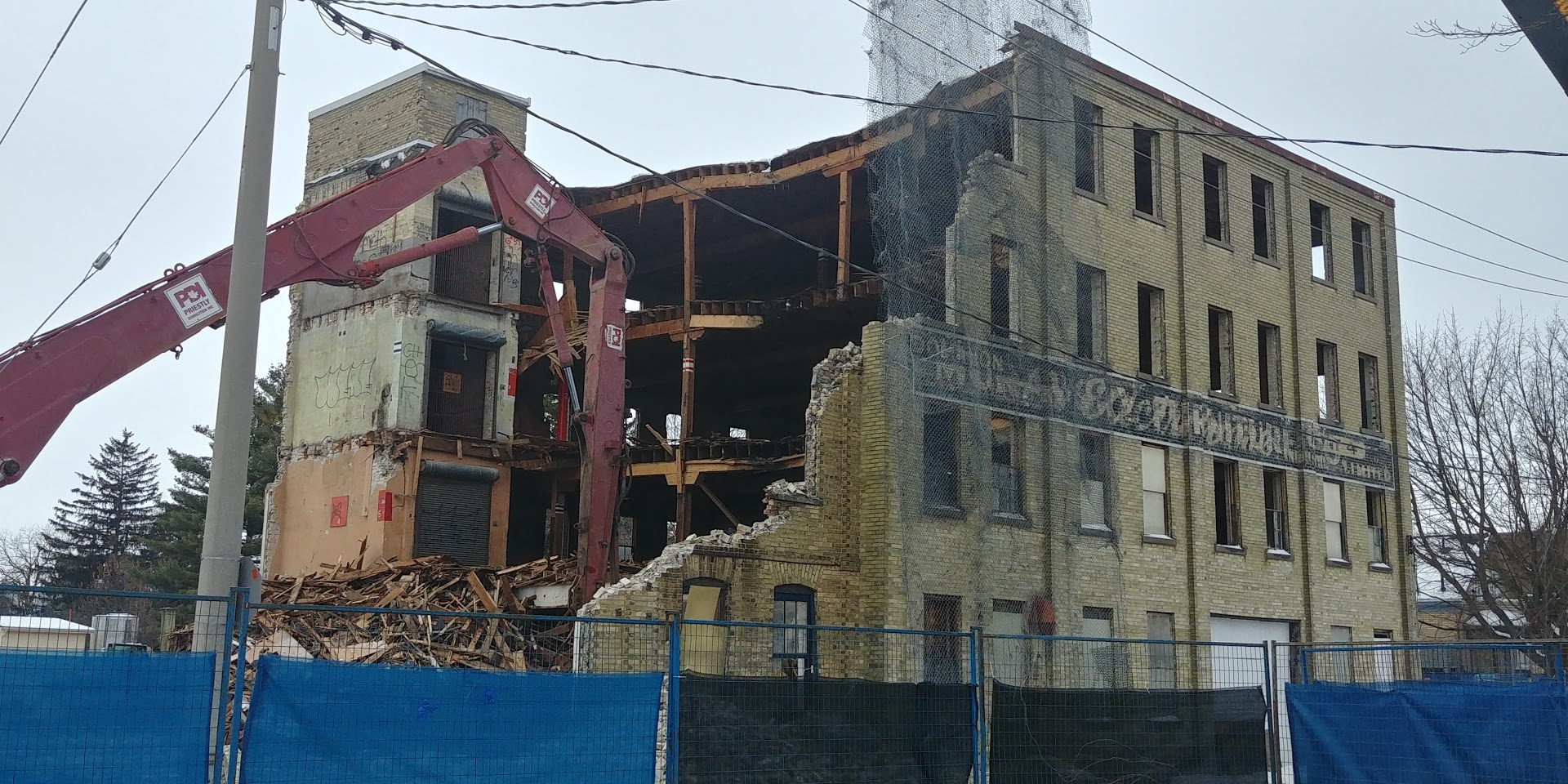
View of the 152 Shanley Street factory being demolished in January 2020.

Electrohome Plant 4 was located at 152 Shanley Street in Kitchener. Built in 1898, it was originally a factory for the Diamond (or L. C. Klippert) Furniture Company, run by industrialist Leander Klippert. The company only lasted until 1902, and the factory sat vacant until 1905, when it became occupied by the Walker Bin and Store Fixture Company. Walker's was run by William McCuaig until 1912, then Oliver Kinzie. The company produced a variety of retail store furniture such as store counters, wall bins, floor racks, and display units. In 1928, Walker's was taken over by a larger American furniture concern, Jones Brothers, which operated the factory until 1931 when production ended due to the Great Depression.

The building was yet again disused until 1934, when brothers J. Hogarth and J. North Kennedy operated a fine bedroom and dining room furniture manufacturing company, Kennedy's, out of the building. However, the company was short-lived, and the building was once again vacant from 1935 to mid-1937, when it was taken over by Murawsky's Furniture.

Martin Murawsky was a Polish immigrant who had arrived in Kitchener as a child in 1876. With his sons, he had operated his own company, Murawsky's Furniture, out of a plant at 152 Victoria Street, near Park Street. They would operate the Shanley Street plant for sixteen years, until Murawsky's, by then run by Martin's sons, decided to focus on chair manufacturing and pivot toward the rapidly growing retail industry. As a result, they sold the Shanley Street plant to Dominion Electrohome.

Electrohome initially used the plant to manufacture its Deilcraft brand of furniture, but by the mid-1950s was also using it for lighting and heating appliance manufacturing, as well as storage. The company sold the building in 1968 to Morval Durofoam Products. Morval occupied the site until around 1980, where it manufactured plastic and foam products for auto interiors, as well as specialty packaging products. After this, the plant was sold to its final major occupant, Art Rite Advertising, which used the site until 1991.

In the years afterward, the Ontario Ministry of the Environment became aware that the property was heavily contaminated with various metals, petroleum hydrocarbons, volatile organic compounds (VOCs), and trichloroethylene (TCE), a toxic industrial solvent. This would prove to be the century-old factory's undoing. For the next few decades, parties ranging from local residents to various government bodies worked toward environmental remediation of the site and the possibility of redevelopment, with or without the original factory structure. In 2007, the Ministry of the Environment issued a cleanup order, but the property's owner, an absentee numbered company, failed to do so, to undertake basic property maintenance, or even to pay municipal property taxes. In 2011, the City of Kitchener attempted a tax sale of the property after visible deterioration of the brick facade was observed. This was unsuccessful, and followed in 2018 by a second attempt, with the price being dropped to around $450,000. By 2019, the city had written off much of the back taxes owed for the property, and issued an order to have an engineer evaluate whether the factory building was still structurally sound. In late 2019, the property was purchased by a Toronto-based developer, which announced plans to demolish the plant and build a mixed-use development on the site, which would incorporate aspects of the original structure. Demolition began in January 2020.

== See also ==
- List of television manufacturers
- Bell Media
