= CJOS-FM =

Radio station in Owen Sound

Coordinates: 44°30′44″N 80°57′13″W

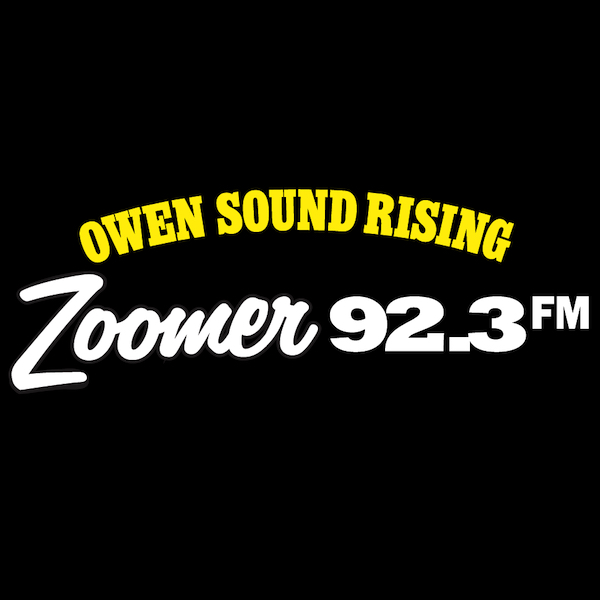
- Owen Sound, Ontario; Canada
- Broadcast area: Owen Sound
- Frequency: 92.3 MHz
- Branding: Zoomer 92.3

Programming
- Format: Oldies

Ownership
- Owner: ZoomerMedia

History
- First air date: July 26, 2010
- Call sign meaning: OS for Owen Sound

Technical information
- Class: B
- ERP: 9,400 watts
- HAAT: 214 metres (702 ft)

Links
- Website: zoomerfm.ca

CJOS-FM (92.3 FM, "Zoomer 92.3") is a radio station in Owen Sound, Ontario. Owned by ZoomerMedia, the station carries an oldies format.

== History ==
On May 9, 2008, Larche Communications received approval from the CRTC to operate a new FM radio station at 92.3 MHz in Owen Sound. The CJOS call sign formerly belonged to a religious station in Caronport, Saskatchewan, which ceased broadcasting in 2006.

On June 9, 2010, CJOS received CRTC approval to decrease their effective radiated power from 20,000 watts to 9,400 watts. The station officially signed on the air with a mix of rock music and classic hits as 92.3 The Dock on July 26, 2010.

On August 9, 2017, Bell Media announced that it would acquire CJOS from Larche Communications. Bell Media received approval from the CRTC on February 14, 2018.

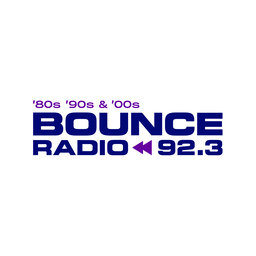
Logo as "Bounce 92.3" used from 2021–2025

As part of a mass format reorganization by Bell Media, on May 18, 2021, CJOS dropped its 92.3 The Dock branding, shifted to adult hits, and adopted the Bounce branding.

On February 8, 2024, Bell announced that it would sell CJOS to ZoomerMedia, as part of a reorganization of its radio division. The CRTC approved the sale on December 12, 2024.

On April 2, 2025, ZoomerMedia flipped CJOS to oldies as "Zoomer 92.3", with a new lineup maintaining some of the station's existing personalities (including morning hosts Ted Easton and Diana Meder) and adding new specialty programming.
