= Baden Hill =

Baden Hills
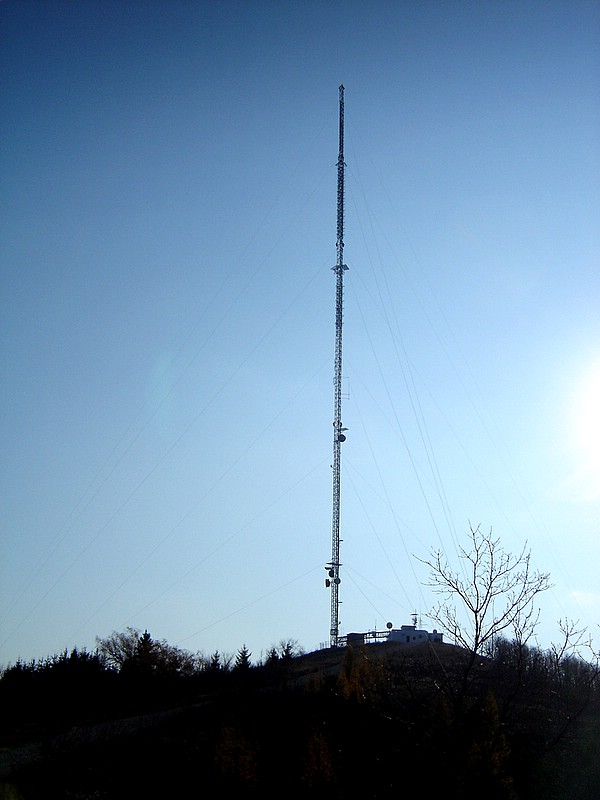
- CKCO Baden Tower Ontario

Highest point
- Peak: eastmost hill
- Elevation: 354 m (1,161 ft)
- Coordinates: 43°24′17″N 80°38′05″W

Geography
- Location within Ontario
- Country: Canada
- Province: Ontario
- Regional Municipality: Waterloo
- Municipalities: Wilmot; Baden
- Range coordinates: 43°24′13″N 80°38′17″W

Geology
- Orogeny: Laurentide Ice Sheet
- Rock age: Pleistocene - Last glacial period
- Rock type(s): kame hills in a sand plain and kame moraine complex Mesic, sandy-loam upland forest soils

The Baden Hills are four glacier-made kames near the community of Baden in the Township of Wilmot, Ontario, Canada. Because of their elevation, up to 434 metres (1,424 ft), they have been used for radio and TV transmission towers, most notably Baden Tower on the highest and eastmost hill that hosts the antennas for Kitchener's CKCO-DT. They can be seen from practically anywhere in Wilmot Township.

== History ==
A large village was present on the side of the Baden Hills during the Late Woodland period.
