= CKGL =

Radio station in Kitchener, Ontario (1949–2026)

Coordinates: 43°17′25″N 80°21′09″W

- Final CKGL logo from 2025 to 2026.
- Kitchener, Ontario; Canada
- Broadcast area: Waterloo Region
- Frequency: 570 kHz
- Branding: 570 NewsRadio Kitchener

Programming
- Format: Defunct (was News - Talk - Sports)
- Affiliations: CityNews; The Canadian Press; ABC News Radio; Associated Press; Bloomberg Radio; Kitchener Rangers; Toronto Blue Jays; Hamilton Tiger-Cats; Westwood One Sports

Ownership
- Owner: Rogers Radio; (Rogers Media, Inc.)
- Sister stations: CIKZ-FM, CHYM-FM

History
- First air date: 1949
- Last air date: July 7, 2026
- Former call signs: CKCR-FM (1949–1965); CHYM-FM (1965–1972); CKGL-FM (1972–1992)
- Former frequencies: 96.7 MHz (1949–1992)
- Call sign meaning: Kitchener Great Lakes Broadcasting Company (former owner)

Technical information
- Licensing authority: CRTC
- Class: B
- Power: 10,000 watts

Links
- Website: kitchener.citynews.ca/

CKGL (570 AM) was a Canadian radio station in Kitchener, Ontario, serving the Waterloo Region. It aired an news/talk/sports radio format branded on-air as 570 NewsRadio Kitchener. The station was owned by Rogers Radio, a division of Rogers Sports & Media, with studios on The Boardwalk off Ira Needles Boulevard.

CKGL broadcast at 10,000 watts. To protect other stations on 570 AM from interference, it used a directional antenna with a five-tower array. The transmitter was off Brant-Waterloo Road in North Dumfries, about 20 kilometres (12 miles) south of Kitchener.

== Programming ==
On weekdays, CKGL had all-news blocks in morning and afternoon drive times. In late mornings, Mike Farwell hosted a local talk and interview show, followed by the nationally syndicated Now You Know with Rob Snow. On weekday evenings, daytime shows were repeated and Westwood One Sports ran overnight. Kitchener today with Brian Bourke also had a show that ran until February 2022. It was on Weekdays from 12-3 Temporarily after that, Producer Paulie & Brittney hosted before it was Mike Farwell from 9-3

CKGL carried professional baseball, football and hockey games. It was a network affiliate of the Toronto Blue Jays Radio Network and of the Hamilton Tiger-Cats Audio Network. The station also broadcast Kitchener Rangers games of the Ontario Hockey League.

== History ==
=== Early years ===
The station was launched in 1949 on the FM dial. It was heard on 96.7 MHz and its call sign was CKCR-FM. Few people owned FM receivers in that era, so it mostly simulcast the programming of sister station 1490 CKCR.

CKGL 96.7 logo

In 1965, the stations were acquired by Great Lakes Broadcasting, a consortium that included the publishing company Maclean-Hunter. Both stations changed their call signs to CHYM (pronounced as "chime") that year. Among the disc jockeys heard on CHYM were Gene Scott, Vic Thomas, Sandy Hoyt, Keith Sterling, and Larry Shannon.

Original CKGL 570 logo

=== Easy listening ===
In the late 1960s, the Canadian government was encouraging FM stations to offer distinct programming from their AM counterparts. An easy listening format was launched on CHYM-FM in 1968.

In 1972, the FM outlet's call letters changed again, to CKGL (evidently for "Kitchener, Great Lakes"). In 1982, Maclean-Hunter took over full ownership of the stations. The format on the FM station flipped to country music. The AM station remained full service adult contemporary.

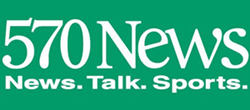
Original 570 News logo

=== AM-FM switch ===
Management decided the country music programming should be on the AM station and the AC format should go on the FM station. The CHYM and CKGL intellectual units (call signs, branding, and programming, but not the licences themselves) swapped frequencies on September 4, 1992, at 8:00 a.m. CKGL moved to the AM band and CHYM moved to the FM band.

CRTC approval was required. But it was treated as only a format swap between the existing stations at 570 and 96.7, not a formal exchange of frequencies.

=== Rogers Communications ===
The stations became part of Rogers Communications in 1994 when that company acquired Maclean-Hunter. Through the 1990s, CKGL added more talk programming and reduced the amount of music it played. On June 19, 1997, CKGL completed its transition and became a news-talk station. In late 2005, CKGL adopted an all-news format for the morning and afternoon drive time slots.

In 2007, CKGL won the RTNDA Edward R. Murrow Award for "Best Newscast". The winning newscast aired Friday October 6, 2006 at 7 AM and highlighted RIM co-CEO Jim Balsillie's intent to buy the Pittsburgh Penguins. CKGL had a reporter live in Pittsburgh when Balsillie made the announcement.

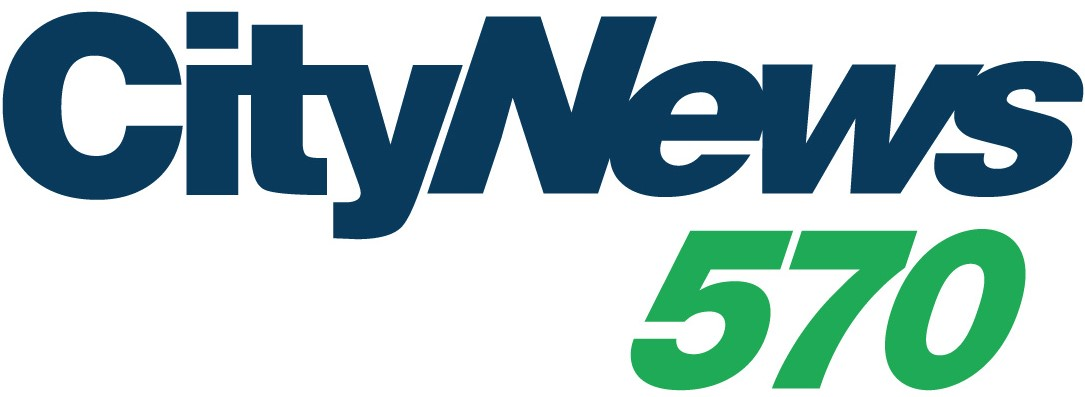
Logo from 2021 until 2024

In June 2021, Rogers announced that it would rebrand CKGL and its other all-news and news-talk radio stations under the CityNews brand beginning October 18, 2021. The broadcast signal of Citytv's Toronto flagship station reaches Waterloo Region and is also available on cable, satellite, and fibre TV services, but Citytv Toronto does not cover local news in the Kitchener-Waterloo market.

On July 7, 2026 Rogers announced that CKGL had shut down as one of six radio station closures in various locations across the country, with the licence being returned to the CRTC.
