= Victoria Park Place =

Building in Windsor, Ontario, Canada

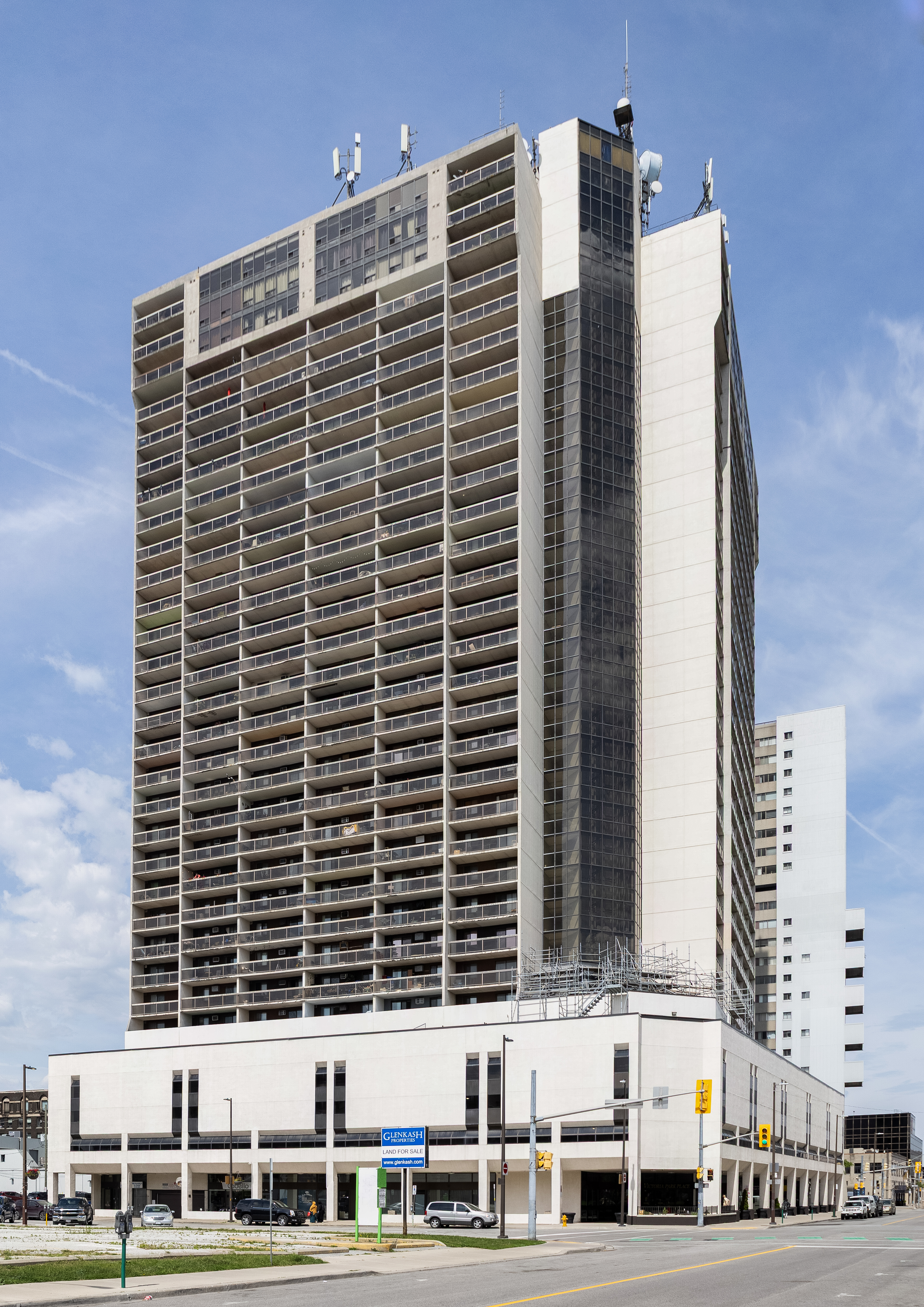
Victoria Park Place

Victoria Park Place in Windsor is the second tallest building in Ontario, measuring 88.7 m (291 ft) and featuring 31 floors. Its construction was completed in 1979. The building is constructed with reinforced concrete and concrete planks, giving it a distinctive "L" shape. It is located at the corner of Park Street and Victoria Avenue in downtown Windsor, on the site of the former Norton Palmer Hotel.
