= CICZ-FM =

Radio station in Midland, Ontario

Coordinates: 44°31′55″N 79°39′44″W

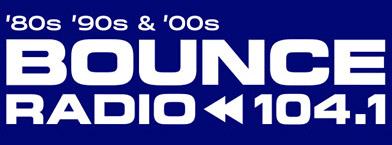
- Midland, Ontario; Canada
- Broadcast area: Central Ontario
- Frequency: 104.1 MHz
- Branding: Bounce 104.1

Programming
- Format: Adult hits

Ownership
- Owner: Bell Media

History
- First air date: July 1, 1959
- Former call signs: CKMP (1959–1994)
- Former frequencies: 1230 kHz (1959–1994)
- Call sign meaning: Station branded as "KICX FM" with CICX-FM in Orillia

Technical information
- Class: B
- ERP: 9,354 watts average 20,000 watts peak
- HAAT: 236.7 metres (777 ft)

Links
- Webcast: Listen Live
- Website: iheartradio.ca/bounce/simcoe-county

CICZ-FM is a Canadian radio station, broadcasting at 104.1 FM in Midland, Ontario. The station, owned by Bell Media, airs an adult hits format branded as Bounce 104.1.

== History ==
Midland-Penetang Broadcasting Ltd. opened CKMP 1230 AM on July 1, 1959, with studios at 196 Dominion Avenue in Downtown Midland. The "MP" in the call letters was for the towns of Midland and Penetanguishene. CKMP was home to many well-known announcers, including Jim Van Horne, Brian Henderson, Dan McLean and Ken Rowland.

On December 13, 1984, the CRTC approved a number of applications for a number of AM radio stations across Ontario including CKMP Midland to increase their nighttime power from 250 watts to 1,000 watts.

The studios moved in 1990 to a new facility on Cranston Crescent off Highway 12 in Midland, in a facility that also housed Telemedia's community newspapers. On June 3, 1992, CKMP was given permission to rebroadcast the programming of co-owned CFOR in Orillia between 1:00 and 6:00 a.m. (with local inserts). When the simulcast began, CKMP's format changed from AC gold to country.

CKMP moved to 104.1 FM in 1994, changing call letters to CICZ-FM, while CFOR became CICX-FM, broadcasting at 105.9 FM. Both stations were branded as KICX-FM, sharing announcers and programming for much of their daily schedule. This arrangement continued until CICX switched to the "EZ Rock" format in 1996.

Larche Communications purchased CICZ from Telemedia in 1997, and acquired CICX from Rogers Communications in 2007.

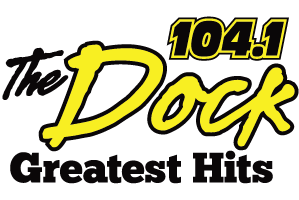
Former "Dock" logo until 2021

On March 3, 2008, Larche moved the country format to CICX, replacing the Orillia station's former "Jack FM" format, and adopted the classic rock format on CICZ. Most recently, the station adopted a classic hits format as 104.1 The Dock.

In July 2011, Larche Communications applied to increase CICZ-FM's power from 9,354 watts (20,000 watts Max. ERP) to 33,500 watts (100,000 watts Max. ERP). This application was denied on June 4, 2012.

On August 9, 2017, Bell Media announced that it would acquire CICZ. Bell Media received approval from the CRTC on February 14, 2018.

As part of a mass format reorganization by Bell Media, on May 18, 2021, CICZ shifted to adult hits, and adopted the Bounce branding.
