= Media in Greater Sudbury =

This is a list of media outlets in the city of Greater Sudbury, Ontario, Canada.

As the largest city in Northeastern Ontario, Greater Sudbury is the region's primary media centre. Due to the relatively small size of the region's individual media markets, most of the region is served at least partially by Sudbury-based media — CICI-TV produces almost all local programming on the CTV Northern Ontario system, and the CBC Radio stations CBCS-FM and CBON-FM broadcast to the entire region through extensive rebroadcaster networks. As well, some of the commercial radio stations in Northeastern Ontario's smaller cities simulcast programming produced by sister stations in Sudbury for at least a portion of their programming schedules, particularly in weekend and evening slots.

As of 2009, all radio stations in Sudbury currently operate on the FM dial. Sudbury's last AM radio station, 790 CIGM, turned off its transmitter on September 30, 2009, ending more than 70 years of AM radio broadcasting in the city.

== History ==
Sudbury was home to several notable broadcasting firsts in Canada.

CICI-TV, which launched in 1953 with the call sign CKSO, was the first television station in Canada not directly owned and operated by the Canadian Broadcasting Corporation. It was also one of the first television stations in Canada to broadcast in colour, as well as the first television station in Canada to hire a woman, Judy Jacobson, as a weather presenter.

CHNO went to air in 1947 as the first bilingual radio station in Canada outside of Quebec. Its owner, F. Baxter Ricard, subsequently became the first commercial broadcaster in Canada licensed to operate two AM radio stations in the same city when he opened CFBR in 1957.

== Radio ==
Frequency	Call sign	Branding	Format	Owner	Notes
90.1 FM	CBBS-FM	CBC Music	public music	Canadian Broadcasting Corporation	
90.9 FM	CBBX-FM	Ici Musique	public music	Canadian Broadcasting Corporation	French
91.7 FM	CICS-FM	Pure Country 91.7	country	Bell Media Radio	
92.7 FM	CJRQ-FM	Q92	active rock	Rogers Radio	
93.5 FM	CIGM-FM	Hot 93.5	contemporary hit radio	Stingray Group	Formerly aired on AM 790; converted to FM in 2009.
95.5 FM	CJTK-FM	KFM	Christian music	Eternacom	
96.7 FM	CKLU-FM	CKLU	campus radio	Laurentian University	
98.1 FM	CBON-FM	Ici Radio-Canada Première	public news/talk	Canadian Broadcasting Corporation	French
98.9 FM	CHYC-FM	Le Loup 98.9	hot adult contemporary	Le5 Communications	French. Formerly aired on AM 900; converted to FM in 2000.
99.9 FM	CBCS-FM	CBC Radio One	public news/talk	Canadian Broadcasting Corporation	
101.7 FM	CKJC-FM		tourist information	1158556 Ontario Ltd. (Roger de Brabant)	
103.9 FM	CHNO-FM	Rewind 103.9	classic hits	Stingray Group	Formerly aired on AM 550; converted to FM in 2000.
105.3 FM	CJMX-FM	Kiss 105.3	hot adult contemporary	Rogers Radio	

=== Defunct stations ===
- CKBB (2001–2005)
- CKSO (2002–2006; not to be confused with earlier stations which are still in operation under different call signs)

=== Early radio in Sudbury ===
CKSO radio signed on as Sudbury's first radio station in 1935, but prior to CKSO's sign-on in the 1930s there was a radio station named CFCR under the name of the licensee "Laurentide Air Service, Ltd.", operating on the frequency of 410 metres as of 1924. As of date, there's unknown historical information on this radio station, when it began broadcasting or ceased broadcasting, however, according to the Canadian Communications Foundation page, it's believed the station began broadcasting in 1923 up until around 1925.

=== Out-of-market radio ===
The out-of-market CKNR from Elliot Lake, CJJM from Espanola and CFRM and CHAW from Northeastern Manitoulin and the Islands can be heard in parts of the city, particularly in the western half of Walden.

In 2008, CFRM applied to the Canadian Radio-television and Telecommunications Commission to add a rebroadcaster in Sudbury, citing that this "would allow Sudbury residents who own property on Manitoulin Island to stay connected by providing them with important information relating to local weather, marine and road reports and events specific to Manitoulin." That application was denied by the CRTC on April 29, 2008.

CBCS, CBON and CJTK have repeaters in Espanola and on Manitoulin Island. Most of the city's commercial radio stations, however, are able to serve this region directly from their Sudbury transmitters, due to their higher effective radiated power.

== Television ==
The city is served by only one conventional broadcast station which originates programming locally. The remainder are rebroadcasters of stations from other markets.

Greater Sudbury did not fall into the category of major broadcasting markets, which was the benchmark for the CRTC to force broadcasters to convert to digital on August 31, 2011.

OTA channel	Channel Type	Cable channel	Call sign	Network	Notes
5	Analogue	4	CICI-TV	CTV	flagship of CTV Northern Ontario
11-1	Digital	3	CFGC-DT	Global	rebroadcasts CIII-DT Toronto
41	Analogue	6	CHCH-TV-4	independent	rebroadcasts CHCH-DT Hamilton

=== Defunct television stations ===
On August 1, 2012, the CBC, TVOntario and TFO networks shut down their analogue OTA rebroadcasters. Below is the list of transmitters affected by the shutdown. In all cases, the local cable company continues to carry the originating signal on the same channel.

OTA channel	Cable channel	Call sign	Network	Notes
9	8	CBLT-6	CBC	formerly CKNC-TV, rebroadcast CBLT-DT Toronto
13	12	CBLFT-2	Radio-Canada	rebroadcast CBLFT-DT Toronto
19	2	CICO-TV-19	TVOntario	local relay
25	7	CHLF-TV	TFO	originates from Toronto

=== Cable ===
The cable television provider in the city is EastLink (formerly Northern Cable). The city's community channel is branded as EastLink TV. EastLink also produces a separate channel for real estate and advertising listings, branded as Home & Market Television, on cable channel 13.

American network affiliates available on cable in Sudbury come from Detroit (WDIV/NBC, WXYZ/ABC, WWJ/CBS, WJBK/FOX) and Buffalo (WNED/PBS).

Due to the region's large francophone population, Sudbury is one of the few cities in Ontario whose cable provider carries an affiliate of the Quebec television network Noovo, which has only voluntary carriage rights outside of Quebec, as part of its basic cable package. In most of Ontario, that network is distributed only as part of a subscription digital cable package.

== Print ==
Sudbury's daily newspaper is the Sudbury Star, owned by Postmedia.

A twice-weekly community newspaper, Northern Life, was launched in the 1970s by Laurentian Media Group. It remained in operation as a print title until 2020, when it was acquired by Village Media; the new owners have ceased publication of the paper edition, but its website Sudbury.com remains in operation as a digital-only publication similar to Village Media's existing community news websites. The acquisition also included the magazine Northern Ontario Business.

There are also student newspapers at the city's postsecondary institutions: Lambda and L'Orignal déchaîné at Laurentian University, The Shield at Cambrian College and L'Étudiant at Collège Boréal.

Sudbury Coffee News is a restaurant publication delivered to restaurants, coffee shops, hotels and other establishments in the Sudbury area.

In the early 1960s, the city saw a "newspaper war" between two startup weekly newspapers, the Sudbury Sun and the Sudbury Scene. The Sun, a publication of Northland Publishers, was out of business by 1962, and filed a competition lawsuit against the Scene, a division of Thomson Corporation which owned the Sudbury Star at the time, alleging that the Scene had deliberately undercut the Sun's advertising rates to protect Thomson's monopoly on English-language periodical publication in the city. The federal trade practices commission ruled in Thomson's favour.

A francophone community paper, Le Voyageur, is published weekly. One of the longest-running Franco-Ontarian newspapers, L'Ami du peuple, was published in Sudbury weekly from 1942 to 1968. Le Voyageur commenced publishing shortly after L'Ami du peuple ceased.

Sudbury is also, along with Thunder Bay, one of the major centres of Finnish-Canadian settlement. An important historical Finnish newspaper, Vapaus, was published from 1917 to 1974. Arvo Vaara, an early editor of the newspaper, was convicted in 1929 on charges of sedition and libel after purportedly publishing unpatriotic remarks against King George V.

== Internet ==
In early 2005, an internet newspaper was launched as Sudbury News Now, delivering local information, such as news, weather and sports. It also included breaking news updates, but was discontinued less than a year later.

Northern Life and EastLink were partners in Sudbury24.ca, an online video community which combined news reports from EastLink TV with user-created video content. That service is not currently in operation.
