= CBC Sudbury =

CBC Sudbury refers to:

- CBCS-FM, CBC Radio One on 99.9 FM
- CBBS-FM, CBC Radio 2 on 90.1 FM
- CBLT-6 (formerly CKNC-TV), CBC Television on channel 9, rebroadcasts CBLT

SRC Sudbury refers to:

- CBON-FM, Première Chaîne on 98.1 FM
- CBBX-FM, Espace Musique on 90.9 FM
- CBLFT-2, Télévision de Radio-Canada on channel 13, rebroadcasts CBLFT
