= 2day FM (disambiguation) =

2Day FM 104.1 (2DAY) is a radio station in Sydney, New South Wales, Australia.

2day FM or Today FM may also refer to:

- Hit Network, formerly the Today Network, a network of radio stations flagshipped by 2Day FM
- 2day FM (Fiji), a radio station in Fiji
- CJED-FM 105.1 and CFLZ-FM 101.1, radio stations in the Niagara Region of Ontario, Canada that use the 2day FM branding
- Today FM, a radio network in Ireland
- Today FM (New Zealand), a defunct radio network in New Zealand
- Today (BBC Radio 4), a radio programme on BBC Radio 4
