= CKEY =

CKEY may refer to:

- CKEY-FM, a low-powered tourist information radio station (98.5 FM) licensed to Barrie, Ontario, Canada
- CFLZ-FM, a radio station (101.1 FM) licensed to Fort Erie, Ontario, Canada, which held the call sign CKEY-FM from 1991 to 2011
- CHKT, a radio station (1430 AM) licensed to Toronto, Ontario, Canada, which held the call sign CKEY from 1945 to 1991
