= CBCU =

CBCU may refer to:

- CBCU-FM, a radio rebroadcaster (89.9 FM) licensed to Chapleau, Ontario, Canada, rebroadcasting CBCS-FM
- CBCU-TV, a television retransmitter (channel 7) licensed to Chapleau, Ontario, Canada, retransmitting CBLT
