= CBCE =

CBCE may refer to:

- CBCE-FM, a radio station (97.5 FM) licensed to Little Current, Ontario, Canada
- CBCE-TV, a television station (channel 16) licensed to Little Current
