= Le5 =

Le5 may refer to:

- LE-5, a model of liquid rocket engine
- Le5 Communications, a Canadian radio broadcasting company
- LE5 Engine, model number of a 2.4 L General Motors Ecotec Internal Combustion Engine
