= CFIF-FM =

Radio station in Ontario, Canada

Coordinates: 48°45′31″N 80°41′08″W

- Iroquois Falls, Ontario; Canada
- Broadcast area: Cochrane area
- Frequency: 101.1 MHz
- Branding: Moose FM

Programming
- Language: English
- Format: Adult contemporary

Ownership
- Owner: Vista Broadcast Group
- Sister stations: CHPB-FM

History
- First air date: September 28, 1998; 28 years ago
- Former frequencies: 104.9 MHz (1998–2000)
- Call sign meaning: Iroquois Falls

Technical information
- Class: LP
- ERP: 33 watts Vertical Polarization Only
- HAAT: 32 metres (105 ft)

Links
- Website: mycochranenow.com

CFIF-FM is a Canadian radio station, which broadcasts at 101.1 FM in Iroquois Falls, Ontario. The station airs an adult contemporary format branded as Moose FM.

The station received approval from the Canadian Radio-television and Telecommunications Commission (CRTC) to operate a new low-power English language FM radio programming at Iroquois Falls on September 28, 1998, which was launched in 1998 by Tri-Tel Communications as CJWL-FM at 104.9 FM, and moved to its current frequency at 101.1 FM in 2000. The frequency change from 104.9 MHz to 101.1 MHz would eliminate the interference from CBON-FM-21 at 104.9 MHz in Gogama.

In 2003, CJWL and its sister station CHPB-FM in Cochrane were purchased by their owner, Haliburton Broadcasting Group.

Haliburton changed the station's callsign to CFIF-FM in 2005, enabling Evanov Radio Group to take over the old callsign for its own new CJWL-FM in Ottawa. The "IF" in the CFIF-FM callsign stands for Iroquois Falls.

On April 23, 2012 Vista Broadcast Group, which owns a number of radio stations in western Canada, announced a deal to acquire Haliburton Broadcasting, in cooperation with Westerkirk Capital. The transaction was approved by the CRTC on October 19, 2012.

Current operation status of CFIF is unknown. It is believed that CFIF is a rebroadcaster of CHPB-FM.
