= CHYK-FM =

Radio station in Timmins, Ontario

Coordinates: 48°27′57″N 81°26′52″W

- Timmins, Ontario; Canada
- Frequency: 104.1 MHz
- Branding: Le Loup 104.1

Programming
- Language: French
- Format: Hot adult contemporary

Ownership
- Owner: Le5 Communications
- Sister stations: CHYC-FM, CHYQ-FM

History
- First air date: December 23, 1951
- Former call signs: CFCL (1952–1990); CKOY (1990–2000)
- Former frequencies: 580 kHz (1951–1957); 620 kHz (1957–1999)
- Call sign meaning: pronounced like the French word "chic"

Technical information
- Class: A
- ERP: 3,500 watts
- HAAT: 76 metres (249 ft)

Links
- Website: leloupfm.com/timmins

CHYK-FM is a Canadian radio station, which broadcasts at 104.1 FM in Timmins, Ontario. It broadcasts a francophone hot adult contemporary format for the city's Franco-Ontarian community. It is owned by Le5 Communications, and branded as Le Loup 104.1.

CHYK and its sister stations CHYC-FM in Sudbury and CHYQ-FM in West Nipissing are the only francophone commercial stations programmed entirely in Ontario. Apart from commercials and local weather updates, the three stations now simulcast the same programming at virtually all times; although all three stations formerly produced their own individual morning shows and then each hosted a later daypart within a shared broadcast schedule for the remainder of the day, all of the stations are now programmed from Sudbury.

== History ==
The station was originally established on December 23, 1951, by J. Conrad Lavigne, with the callsign CFCL at 580 kHz. CFCL was Ontario's first French language radio station. It operated as a private affiliate of Radio-Canada's French radio network. CFLH in Hearst began broadcasting the same year. In 1956, Lavigne also established CFCL-TV, a private CBC Television affiliate, in the city.

In 1957, CFLK began broadcasting at 1230 kHz in Kapuskasing. In 1960, CFCL in Timmins moved from 580 kHz to 620 kHz.

On July 28, 1975, Lavigne was denied an application to change CFCL's frequency from 620 to 850 kHz with an increase in night-time power from 5,000 to 10,000 watts, with daytime power remaining at 10,000 watts. The station would have switched from different day and night patterns to directional at night only, to protect Class-A clear-channel station KOA in Denver. The partner application to use the 620 kHz frequency in Sudbury with 10,000 watts day and 5,000 watts night (single directional pattern) was also denied.

In 1979, Lavigne again attempted to change CFCL's frequency and launch a new station in Sudbury. The application, which was identical to the one filed in 1975, was yet again denied. That year, competing broadcasters CKAP Kapuskasing (which had proposed a rebroadcast station in Timmins on 1450 kHz with 10,000 watts day and 5,000 watts at night) and Lavigne and Cambrian Broadcasting (competing for a license for a new AM station at 730 kHz with 10,000 watts in North Bay) also had their applications denied on April 12, 1979.

In 1980, Lavigne's broadcast holdings were eventually merged into the Mid-Canada Communications system. When that company acquired several other radio stations in 1985, CFCL became a commercial station as part of the Mid-Canada Radio network, and disaffiliated from Radio-Canada.

On December 13, 1984, the CRTC approved a number of applications for a number of AM radio stations across Ontario including CFLH Hearst to increase their nighttime power from 250 watts to 1,000 watts.

Mid-Canada Radio was sold to the Pelmorex Radio Network in 1990. Because the radio and television station no longer had common ownership, the radio station's callsign was subsequently changed to CKOY. CFLH (1340 kHz) in Hearst later adopted the call sign CHOH, and was converted to 92.9 MHz in 1995, while CFLK in Kapuskasing adopted the call sign CHYK.

Pelmorex, in turn, sold its stations to the Haliburton Broadcasting Group in 1999. CKOY was converted to 104.1 FM, and took over the CHYK callsign from its rebroadcaster in Kapuskasing. The Kapuskasing (AM 1230 kHz) rebroadcaster was in turn converted to FM 93.7 MHz in 2003 and later adopted its current callsign CHYX-FM.

In 2008, Haliburton announced a deal to sell the CHYC stations to Le5 Communications, a firm owned by Sudbury lawyer Paul Lefebvre. This deal was approved by the CRTC on October 31, 2008. Le5 Communications rebranded the station as Le Loup in early 2009.

In 2010, Le5 Communications also launched the weekly community newspaper L'Express de Timmins.

On March 2, 2012, Le5 Communications received approval from the CRTC to change the authorized contours of the station's rebroadcaster in Hearst, by changing the antenna radiation pattern from directional to non-directional, increasing the average effective radiated power (ERP) from 140 to 172 watts (maximum ERP from 140 to 221 watts), decreasing the effective height of antenna above average terrain from 56.6 to 43 metres and relocating the antenna site.

In 2016, Le5 Communications announced that it was closing the station's transmitters in Hearst and Kapuskasing.

A historical plaque in the city's Mattagami Park commemorates the station's historic role in the local Franco-Ontarian community.

== Former Transmitters ==
Former rebroadcasters of CHYK-FM Timmins that were shut down in 2016.

Rebroadcasters of CHYK-FM
City of licence	Identifier	Frequency	Power	Class	RECNet
Hearst	CHYK-FM-3	92.9 FM	140 watts	A1	Query
Kapuskasing	CHYX-FM	93.7 FM	3400 watts	A	Query
