= CFBG-FM =

Radio station in Bracebridge, Ontario

Coordinates: 45.04541°N 79.32651°W

- Bracebridge, Ontario; Canada
- Broadcast area: Muskoka
- Frequency: 99.5 MHz (FM)
- Branding: 99.5 Moose FM

Programming
- Format: Hot adult contemporary

Ownership
- Owner: Vista Radio

History
- First air date: 1987
- Former frequencies: 100.9 MHz (1988–2002)
- Call sign meaning: CFBG = CFBracebridge/Gravenhurst

Technical information
- Class: B
- ERP: 12 kW
- HAAT: 85.5 meters (281 ft)

Links
- Website: mymuskokanow.com

CFBG-FM is a hot adult contemporary radio station broadcasting at 99.5 FM in Bracebridge, Ontario and is owned by the Vista Broadcast Group.

Compared to Huntsville's CFBK-FM, which has a massive coverage area around Muskoka and beyond, CFBG runs at a relatively low power from a short transmitter. Its reliable signal only covers Gravenhurst/Bracebridge and the surrounding area, extending to Huntsville in the north and Orillia in the south. In the southernmost area of its coverage area, the signal is often impacted from co-channel interference from WDCX in Buffalo, New York, which broadcasts on the same frequency.

== History ==
ThIt's signal only reliability covers Gravenhurst,eBracebridge, and the surrounding station originally Huntsville in the North, and Orillia in the south. In the southern edge of its coverage area, CFBG suffers from began broadcasting at 100.9 FM in 1988, however, in the CRTC decision, the proposed frequency was 107.7 MHz. The station was originally operated by a partnership between Telemedia and local company Muskoka-Parry Sound Broadcasting, the owner of CFBK-FM in Huntsville. During this era, CFBG aired a mix of locally produced programming and simulcasting of CFBK.

CFBG was acquired by Haliburton Broadcasting Group in 1997. The station moved to its current frequency at 99.5 FM in 2002 with the on-air branding 99.5 Moose FM.

On April 23, 2012, Vista Broadcast Group, which owns a number of radio stations in western Canada, announced a deal to acquire Haliburton Broadcasting, in cooperation with Westerkirk Capital. The transaction was approved by the CRTC on October 19, 2012.
