= CHYQ-FM =

Radio station in West Nipissing, Ontario

- West Nipissing, Ontario; Canada
- Broadcast area: Nipissing District
- Frequency: 97.1 MHz
- Branding: Le Loup 97.1

Programming
- Language: French
- Format: Hot adult contemporary

Ownership
- Owner: Le5 Communications
- Sister stations: CHYK-FM, CHYC-FM

History
- First air date: February 6, 2014
- Call sign meaning: an available call sign that could be pronounced like the French word "chic"

Technical information
- Class: B1
- ERP: 6,500 watts
- HAAT: 45.7 metres (150 ft)

Links
- Website: leloupfm.com/nipissing/

CHYQ-FM is a Canadian radio station, which broadcasts at 97.1 FM in West Nipissing, Ontario. It broadcasts a francophone hot adult contemporary format for the local Franco-Ontarian community. It is owned by Le5 Communications, and branded as Le Loup 97.1.

CHYQ and its sister stations CHYK-FM in Timmins and CHYC-FM in Sudbury are the only francophone commercial stations programmed entirely in Ontario. Apart from commercials and local weather updates, the three stations now simulcast the same programming at virtually all times; although all three stations formerly produced their own individual morning shows and then each hosted a later daypart within a shared broadcast schedule for the remainder of the day, all of the stations are now programmed from Sudbury.

== History ==
On August 4, 2010, Le5 Communications filed an application with the CRTC to launch the station. The company received license approval on January 6, 2011.

Prior to the launch of CHYQ, the region's francophone audience was served solely by CFSF-FM, which aired a bilingual format featuring programming in both English and French. A local non-profit group previously held short-term licenses to broadcast special events programming in the region on 93.5 FM with the call sign CFDN, but never launched a permanent station.

CHYQ was the first commercial French-language radio station licensed in Ontario since the launch of CHYC's original AM incarnation, CFBR, in 1957; apart from the three Le5 stations, all other French radio stations in Ontario are non-commercial outlets owned by non-profit community radio groups or Radio-Canada.

On November 15, 2013, Le5 received approval from the CRTC to extend the time limit to January 6, 2015, to commence the operation of the French-language commercial FM station in Nipissing, Ontario. This was the final extension to be granted by the commission.

On December 3, 2013, the station began on air testing lasting until February 5, 2014. The station officially launched at 7 a.m. on February 6, 2014.

On July 16, 2014, the CRTC approved Le5's application to change the authorized contours of CHYQ‑FM by changing the radiation pattern of the antenna from directional to non-directional, by decreasing the average effective radiated power (ERP) of the transmitter from 47,100 to 6,500 watts (maximum ERP from 77,600 to 6,500 watts) and by decreasing the effective height of antenna above average terrain from 136.2 to 45.7 meters. The station's class will change from C1 to B1.
