= CJFB =

The call sign CJFB may represent:

- CJFB Performance Award, a popular film and musical award ceremony held annually in Bangladesh
- CJFB-FM 105.5 FM, a radio station in Bolton, Ontario, Canada
- CJFB-TV channel 5, a television station in Swift Current, Saskatchewan, Canada that operated from 1957 to 2002
