= CJRN =

Former radio station in Niagara Falls, Ontario, Canada

- Niagara Falls, Ontario; Canada
- Broadcast area: Niagara Region
- Frequency: 710 kHz
- Branding: Tourist Information Radio

Programming
- Format: Travelers' information station

Ownership
- Owner: CJRN 710 Inc.

History
- First air date: 1947
- Last air date: November 30, 2012
- Former call signs: CHVC (1947-1964)
- Former frequencies: 1600 kHz (1947-1970)
- Call sign meaning: Radio Niagara

Technical information
- Class: B
- Power: 5,000 watts

CJRN was an AM radio station in Niagara Falls, Ontario, Canada, which aired on 710 kHz. The "RN" in the call is for Radio Niagara.

The station was launched in 1947 by local businessman B. H. Bedford, operating on AM 1600 with the callsign CHVC. The station's studios were originally located under the Rainbow Bridge.

The station was acquired by Radio Niagara in 1964, and adopted the CJRN calls that year. Radio Niagara moved the station's studios to Clifton Hill in 1965. In 1970, the station moved to its final 710 kHz frequency, and in 1978, Radio Niagara was acquired by local businessman Keith Dancy. In 1986, Dancy also opened CJFT in Fort Erie.

From 1984 to 1992, Buffalo Sabres play-by-play co-announcer Rick Jeanneret hosted a popular morning show on the station. He ended the show after the retirement of Ted Darling made Jeanneret the full-time announcer for the team.

In 1988, CJRN received CRTC approval to increase day power to 10,000 watts; night power would remain 5,000 watts.

Dancy died in 2001, and ownership of the stations was assumed by Niagara Broadcasting. Later that year CJRN, formerly an oldies station, adopted a tourism info format that had previously aired on what previously had been temporary FM station CFLZ-FM, a format similar to the travelers' information stations in the United States.

On August 21, 2009, the CRTC approved an application by Radio 710 AM Inc. for authority to acquire from CJRN 710 Inc.

Because of the format flip, CJRN inherited the onerous restrictions that CFLZ had been required to honor, which severely limited the content that CJRN was allowed to broadcast (the restrictions went so far as to disallow broadcasting of out-of-town sports scores, one of the "violations" of the terms of license cited when the station's license was eventually revoked). These restrictions proved unworkable. The station's licence renewal application was denied by the CRTC on October 10, 2012 due to the station being unable to adhere to those restrictions. As a result, CJRN ceased broadcasting on November 30, 2012.

== Other programming ==
In addition to its regular schedule of tourist information programming, CJRN acted as the radio broadcast home for the sports teams of Buffalo, New York's Canisius College, including men's and women's basketball and hockey. Those broadcasts have since moved to WWWS. It was also the home of Buffalo Blizzard indoor soccer in the 90s when the team was active.
