= CKYY-FM =

Country music radio station in Welland, Ontario, Canada

Coordinates: 42.94747°N 79.27073°W

- Welland, Ontario; Canada
- Broadcast area: Niagara Region
- Frequency: 89.1 MHz
- Branding: Niagara's New Country 89.1

Programming
- Format: Country
- Affiliations: Niagara IceDogs, Niagara River Lions

Ownership
- Owner: My Broadcasting Corporation
- Sister stations: CIXL-FM

History
- First air date: February 20, 2015

Technical information
- Class: A
- ERP: 564 watts average 3,100 watts peak horizontal & vertical polarization
- HAAT: 130.5 metres (428 ft)

Links
- Webcast: Listen Live
- Website: country89.com

CKYY-FM (89.1 FM, "Niagara's New Country 89.1") is a radio station licensed to Welland, Ontario. Owned by My Broadcasting Corporation, it broadcasts a country music format serving Niagara Region.

Its studios and offices are located on Forks Road on the Port Colborne—Welland border. CKYY-FM has an effective radiated power (ERP) of 564 watts average, with a peak of 3,100 watts. The tower has a height above average terrain (HAAT) of 130.5 meters (428 ft). CKYY-FM uses a directional antenna to avoid its signal from interfering with stations in the U.S. The transmitter is located on Matthews Road in Welland .

== History ==
The station's founders received approval from the Canadian Radio-television and Telecommunications Commission (CRTC) on June 26, 2014, to construct a new English-language commercial FM station. The station signed on the air on February 20, 2015.

Previous logo

On May 10, 2019, Stingray Group announced its intent to acquire CKYY and CIXL-FM. However, the sale fell through, and on August 5, 2022, R.B. Communications announced that it would instead sell CIXL and CKYY to My Broadcasting Corporation. The sale was approved by the CRTC on September 20, 2022.
