= Suzanne Rochon-Burnett =

- Born: March 10, 1935; Sainte-Adèle, Quebec, Canada
- Died: March 4, 2006 (aged 70)
- Occupation: business woman
- Awards: Order of Canada; Order of Ontario

Suzanne Rochon-Burnett, CM OOnt (March 10, 1935 – March 4, 2006) was a Canadian Métis businesswoman.

== Biography ==
Born in Sainte-Adèle, Quebec, she was the first aboriginal person in Canada to own and operate a private commercial radio station, Welland, Ontario's SPIRIT 91.7 (now CIXL-FM).

In 1965, she married Gordon W. Burnett. They had one child, Michèle-Élise.

== Lifetime achievements ==
Rochon-Burnett has been involved in several communication and social causes. She became an ambassador for French music from Quebec and France when Chanson à la française was broadcast on 21 stations in Ontario in the late 1970s after years of experience in the media all over the world. Songwriters were charmed by her unique style and elegance when she interviewed them in English.

She was among the first to support Native artists in Ontario, including David General, Vince Bomberry, Shirley Cheechoo and Carl Beam.

She established a special policy at TVOntario for Aboriginal programming and set up a Native scholarship at Brock University in St. Catharines.

== Awards and honours ==
In 2002, she was made a member of the Order of Canada. She was also awarded the Order of Ontario. In 2006, she was inducted into the Canadian Council for Aboriginal Business's Hall of Fame.

== See also ==
- Notable Aboriginal people of Canada
