= Joco Communications =

Joco Communications was a small Canadian radio broadcasting company, which operated radio stations in Sturgeon Falls and Espanola, Ontario. The company's name derives from the name of its founder and president, Joseph Cormier.

== History ==
Joco Communications was incorporated in 2003 when Cormier was granted a license to open CFSF-FM in Sturgeon Falls. The company was granted a second license in 2007 to operate a station in Espanola.

The company also applied for a new FM radio station in Sudbury in 2007, although this application was denied.

On November 13, 2008 the company applied to operate a new radio station in Gravenhurst. This application was denied on June 1, 2009.

On May 20, 2010, the CRTC received an application by the Haliburton Broadcasting Group to acquire Joco's CJJM-FM in Espanola and received approval on August 12, 2010. In September 2010, Joco Communications announced a tentative deal to sell CFSF-FM in Sturgeon Falls to the Haliburton Broadcasting Group, which received CRTC approval on February 21, 2011.

After selling the two stations, Cormier ran as the Liberal candidate for Nickel Belt in the 2011 election, but lost to incumbent Claude Gravelle.

== Formats ==
CFSF-FM Sturgeon Falls aired a variety of programming, including CHR, country and classic rock programs, in both English and French, while CJJM-FM in Espanola aired a similar format exclusively in English. Both stations were branded as Joco Radio.

== Former stations ==
- Sturgeon Falls - CFSF-FM
- Espanola - CJJM-FM
