= Alma Ricard =

Canadian businesswoman (1906–2003)

Alma Ricard OC, née Vézina (October 4, 1906 – June 2, 2003) was a Canadian broadcaster and philanthropist. A partner with her husband F. Baxter Ricard in his broadcasting holdings, including Northern Cable and Mid-Canada Communications, after her husband's death in 1993 she became a prominent donor to institutional and educational charities.

== Background ==
Born in Montreal, she moved to Sudbury in 1931 after accepting a job as a secretary at the hardware store operated by Baxter Ricard's father Félix. She later married Baxter Ricard, and the couple took over the hardware store before moving into broadcasting with the launch of CHNO in 1947. Their broadcast holdings later expanded to include CFBR in 1957, Northern Cable in the early 1970s, and CJMX-FM and the MCTV television system in 1980; they were also shareholders in the Toronto-area cable and broadcasting company CUC Broadcasting. She also served on Sudbury's municipal urban planning committee, and on the board of directors of the Sudbury General Hospital.

== Philanthropy ==
Beginning in 1990, the Ricards began selling off their broadcast holdings, with the television stations acquired by Baton Broadcasting and the radio stations acquired by Pelmorex. The Ricards had no children to inherit their wealth, and began to plan a charitable foundation, which was formally launched after Baxter's death as the Fondation Baxter & Alma Ricard.

The foundation's beneficiaries included Cambrian College, Laurentian University and the Sudbury General Hospital, although her donation to the hospital — which had been earmarked for the purchase of an MRI machine — was withdrawn after the government of Mike Harris announced that the hospital would be merged into the Sudbury Regional Hospital and the MRI machine would be delivered to the formerly competing Laurentian Hospital instead.

Ricard also donated $1 million to St. Michael's Hospital in Toronto for a study on the health impacts of inner city poverty; the hospital created the Baxter and Alma Ricard Chair in Inner City Health in 1998.

In 1998, Ricard made her largest philanthropic donation, giving $23 million to create the Fondation Baxter & Alma Ricard fellowship fund for French Canadian students in university graduate studies. The fund remains in operation today.

In 1999, she endowed a research chair in neurosurgery at the University of Toronto.

== Honours ==
She was granted an honorary doctorate by Laurentian University in 1997. She later received another honorary doctorate from the University of Ottawa.

In 1999, she was inducted into the Order of La Pléiade.

In 2000, Ricard was named an Officer of the Order of Canada, in honor of both her philanthropic work and her longtime history of community involvement. As Ricard was in poor health and unable to travel to Ottawa for her induction, Governor General Adrienne Clarkson personally travelled to Sudbury in 2002 to present Ricard with the honour.

== Death ==
Ricard died on June 2, 2003, in Sudbury, aged 96. Her funeral was held at the city's Sainte-Anne-des-Pins church, and was attended by dignitaries including businessman Paul Desmarais and former Governor General Roméo LeBlanc.
