= CFGM-FM =

Former radio station in Caledon, Ontario, Canada

- Caledon, Ontario; Canada
- Frequency: 102.7 MHz (FM)
- Branding: The View

Programming
- Format: Adult contemporary

Ownership
- Owner: Vista Broadcast Group

History
- First air date: October 15, 2007
- Last air date: May 4, 2015

Technical information
- Transmitter coordinates: 43.87302°N 79.73058°W

CFGM-FM was a Canadian radio station, which aired at 102.7 MHz (FM) in Caledon, Ontario. Originally licensed in 2007 to broadcast a tourist information format, it expanded into a commercial adult contemporary music station in 2009, but was discontinued in 2015 when its owner merged its operations with nearby sister station CJFB-FM.

== History ==
In 2007, Rick Sargent submitted two applications to the Canadian Radio-Television and Telecommunications Commission for low-power stations in Caledon and Bolton; the Bolton station, CJFB-FM, would offer a music format, while the Caledon station, CFGM-FM, would broadcast tourist information. Both licenses were approved on October 15, 2007. After just a few months in operation, however, Sargent applied to convert CFGM-FM into a rebroadcaster of CJFB-FM. That application was denied on July 31, 2008.

On January 29, 2009, Sargent applied for a licence to convert CFGM into a music station, which would offer an adult contemporary format. The station received CRTC approval on June 17, 2009. In August 2009, the station was rebranded as The View.

On March 14, 2012, the CRTC approved an application by Haliburton Broadcasting Group to acquire the stations. On April 23, 2012 Vista Broadcast Group, which owns a number of radio stations in western Canada, announced a deal to acquire Haliburton Broadcasting, in cooperation with Westerkirk Capital. The transaction was approved by the CRTC on October 19, 2012.

On May 4, 2015, Vista received approval from the CRTC to change the frequency of CJFB-FM from 105.5 to 102.7 MHz, along with an adjustment of authorized contours and transmitter power. As an adjunct to that station's changes, Vista submitted a separate application to revoke the licence for CFGM-FM.

The CRTC approved Vista Radio's application to revoke CFGM-FM's broadcasting license on April 10, 2024.
