= CKLP-FM =

Radio station in Parry Sound, Ontario

Coordinates: 45°23′24″N 80°02′20″W

- Parry Sound, Ontario; Canada
- Frequency: 103.3 MHz
- Branding: Moose FM

Programming
- Format: Adult hits

Ownership
- Owner: Vista Broadcast Group

History
- First air date: 1958
- Former frequencies: 1340 kHz (AM) (1958–1986)
- Call sign meaning: Lakeland Playland

Technical information
- Class: B
- ERP: 46.6 kW
- HAAT: 126.5 metres (415 ft)

Links
- Webcast: Listen Live
- Website: myparrysoundnow.com

CKLP-FM is a Canadian radio station, broadcasting at 103.3 FM in Parry Sound, Ontario. Owned by Vista Broadcast Group, the station airs an adult hits format branded as Moose FM.

== History ==
The station was launched by Muskoka-Parry Sound Broadcasting in 1958, airing on AM 1340 as a rebroadcaster of Huntsville's CKAR. In 1976, both stations were sold to Eastern Broadcasting. The following year, Eastern adopted the new call sign CFBQ and launched some local programming on the Parry Sound transmitter.

In 1986, the station was sold to Playland Broadcasting, moving to its current FM frequency, adopting its current call sign and being branded as LP103.

The station was a private affiliate of CBC Radio until 1993, when the CBC added a rebroadcaster of CBL in Parry Sound.

The station was acquired by Haliburton in 2001. The current slogan/branding of CKLP is Moose FM.

On April 23, 2012 Vista Broadcast Group, which owns a number of radio stations in western Canada, announced a deal to acquire Haliburton Broadcasting Group, in cooperation with Westerkirk Capital. The transaction was approved by the CRTC on October 19, 2012.
