= CJED-FM =

Radio station in Niagara Falls, Ontario

Coordinates: 43°05′05″N 79°04′45″W

- Niagara Falls, Ontario; Canada
- Broadcast area: Niagara Region, Western New York
- Frequency: 105.1 MHz
- Branding: 105.1 The River

Programming
- Format: Hot adult contemporary
- Affiliations: Compass Media Networks

Ownership
- Owner: Byrnes Communications Inc
- Sister stations: CFLZ-FM

History
- First air date: 1992
- Former call signs: CFLZ-FM (1992–2011)
- Former frequencies: 91.9 MHz (1992–1998)
- Call sign meaning: Station branded as "Ed FM"

Technical information
- Class: B
- Power: 4,000 watts average 15,000 watts peak vertical polarization only
- HAAT: 127.9 metres (420 ft)

Links
- Webcast: Listen Live
- Website: 105theriver.ca

CJED-FM (105.1 MHz) is a radio station in Niagara Falls, Ontario, Canada and targeting the Greater Niagara Falls area, including the Niagara Region in Ontario and the Buffalo-Niagara Falls metropolitan area in New York. The station operates a hot adult contemporary format branded as 105.1 The River. CJED's studios are located on Ontario Avenue in Niagara Falls. Initially the transmitter was located on the Skylon Tower next to Niagara Falls, but it was later moved to a new site in Thorold.

== History ==
=== Early years (1992–2011) ===
The station was originally launched in 1992 by Keith Dancy, the owner of AM radio station CJRN, as a tourist information station broadcasting at 91.9 FM with an effective radiated power of just 8 watts. The station operated under a series of short-term special events licenses, each initially covering either the summer tourist season or Niagara Falls' annual Winter Festival of Lights. The station's short-term licenses were granted as follows: May 29-October 31, 1992, November 25, 1992 – January 17, 1993, May 3-October 31, 1993, December 23, 1993 – January 31, 1995, April 7, 1995 – January 31, 1996, June 17, 1996 – January 31, 1997 and January 30, 1997 – August 31, 1998.

In 1998, the station moved to its current frequency after the adjacent 91.7 was awarded to CHOW-FM in Welland. Later that year, the station was granted its first long-term license, covering the period from 1998 to 2005.

In 2001, CFLZ and CJRN exchanged formats. CJRN took over the tourist information programming, and CFLZ adopted CJRN's music programming. The following year, CFLZ flipped formats with CKEY-FM, adopting its current adult contemporary format as CKEY, which is closer to the Buffalo market, became an urban CHR station.

In 2004, CFLZ-FM increased their power from 406 watts to 7,200 watts and in 2006, CFLZ-FM decreased power from 7,200 watts to 4,000 watts.

In 2010, the Haliburton Broadcasting Group applied to buy CKEY-FM and sister station CFLZ-FM. The transaction received approval on June 8, 2011.

=== ED FM (2011–2013) ===
On August 24, 2011, after playing Take Me to the River by Talking Heads (also the first song on "The River" when it was launched on CKEY-FM in 1997), CFLZ dropped the hot adult contemporary format and began a two-hour stunt of Christmas music. After this, CFLZ adopted a variety hits format as 105.1 ED FM. In late 2011, the station adopted its current CJED-FM call letters. Sister station CKEY-FM's call letters were replaced with CFLZ-FM.

On April 23, 2012, Vista Broadcast Group, which owns a number of radio stations in western Canada, announced a deal to acquire Haliburton Broadcasting, in cooperation with Westerkirk Capital. The transaction was approved by the CRTC on October 19, 2012.

=== 2Day FM (2013–2018) ===
Logo while simulcasting CFLZ-FM

On September 19, 2013, CJED dropped its adult hits format and branding and began stunting with Christmas music. The next day, at Noon, 105.1 flipped to CHR/Top 40, branded as 2Day FM 105.1/101.1 and began simulcasting its sister station CFLZ-FM.

On December 8, 2014, the CRTC denied an application by Vista Broadcast Group to amend the license of its sister station CFLZ-FM. It cited the company for being in non-compliance with various licensing conditions including deploying CJED-FM as a full-time rebroadcast transmitter without prior approval of the commission. New conditions were placed upon the licensee. Both stations went silent shortly thereafter and returned to air on December 19, 2014, apparently continuing to utilize CJED-FM for simulcasting.

The simulcast ended on July 15, 2016, when CFLZ flipped to adult hits as Juice FM. 2Day FM remained on CJED.

=== The River (2018–present) ===
On January 15, 2018, Byrnes Communications acquired CJED-FM and sister station CFLZ-FM with approval from the CRTC.

Byrnes Communications officially took over CJED on February 1, 2018.

On March 1, 2018, the station switched to an adult contemporary format as 105.1 The River, returning to the format and brand it had carried from 2002 to 2011.

In February 2020, Byrnes announced that it would enter into an advertising sales partnership with Radio One Buffalo—owner of oldies station WECK—to sell advertising for CFLZ and CJED in Buffalo.

As of March 2025, "The River" has taken a more dance-oriented approach to its programming as it seeks to serve a region that consumes similarly formatted radio stations from Toronto and Buffalo.
