= CHGK-FM =

Radio station in Stratford, Ontario

Coordinates: 43°20′13″N 81°00′12″W

- Stratford, Ontario; Canada
- Broadcast area: Southwestern Ontario
- Frequency: 107.7 MHz
- Branding: 107.7 2day FM

Programming
- Format: Hot adult contemporary

Ownership
- Owner: Vista Radio
- Sister stations: CJCS-FM

History
- First air date: September 2, 2003

Technical information
- Class: A
- ERP: 6 kW
- HAAT: 84.7 metres (278 ft)

Links
- Website: 1077 2dayfm

CHGK-FM is a Canadian radio station in Stratford, Ontario with a hot adult contemporary format at 107.7 FM, branded as 107.7 2day FM. CHGK's studios are located at 376 Romeo Street South in Stratford while its transmitter is located on Line 29 just south of Stratford.

== History ==
On December 18, 2002, Raedio Inc. received CRTC approval to operate a new FM radio station in Stratford Ontario.

On September 2, 2003, CHGK began broadcasting as MIX 107.7 FM originally with an Adult contemporary music format and with the slogan "The perfect mix without the hard edge". and was owned by Raedio Inc. CHGK has a sister station, CJCS, that has been broadcasting since 1928.

Former MIX 107.7 FM Logo used until April 2011

In September 2010, Raedio Inc. announced a deal, to sell the station to Haliburton Broadcasting Group which was approved by the CRTC on February 21, 2011.

In spring 2011, Haliburton Broadcasting Group rebranded the station as FM 107.7, Stratford's Lite Favorites retaining the Adult contemporary format.

On April 23, 2012, Vista Broadcast Group, which owns a number of radio stations in Western Canada, announced a deal to acquire Haliburton Broadcasting Group, in cooperation with Westerkirk Capital. The transaction was approved by the CRTC on October 19, 2012.

On September 3, 2014, the station switched to a Hot AC format and was renamed 107.7 2day FM.
