= CFZN-FM =

Radio station in Haliburton, Ontario

Coordinates: 45°07′00″N 78°29′57″W

- Haliburton, Ontario; Canada
- Broadcast area: Haliburton County
- Frequency: 93.5 MHz
- Branding: 93.5 Moose FM

Programming
- Language: English
- Format: Adult hits

Ownership
- Owner: Vista Broadcast Group

History
- First air date: 2005

Technical information
- Class: B1
- ERP: 6 kW; Horizontal Polarization only
- HAAT: 133.2 metres (437 ft)

Links
- Webcast: Listen Live
- Website: myhaliburtonnow.com

CFZN-FM is a Canadian radio station with an adult hits format broadcasting at 93.5 FM in Haliburton, Ontario, and is owned by the Vista Broadcast Group. It was founded by the Haliburton Broadcasting Group. The station uses an on-air branding as 93.5 Moose FM.

CFZN began broadcasting in 2006 after it was given approval by the CRTC on October 13, 2005.

On April 23, 2012, Vista Broadcast Group, which owns a number of radio stations in western Canada, announced a deal to acquire Haliburton Broadcasting Group, in cooperation with Westerkirk Capital. The transaction was approved by the CRTC on October 19, 2012.
