= Haliburton Broadcasting Group =

Canadian broadcast group

- Company type: Private
- Industry: radio broadcasting
- Defunct: 2012
- Fate: acquired by Vista Broadcast Group
- Headquarters: Toronto, Ontario, Canada
- Key people: Christopher Grossman, president
- Owner: Beaumaris Group (70.1%); Slaight Communications (29.9%)
- Website: Haliburton Broadcasting Group

The Haliburton Broadcasting Group was a Canadian group of FM radio stations, located primarily in smaller markets in Ontario. The company was purchased by Vista Broadcast Group in 2012.

== History ==
The company was named for the Haliburton region in Central Ontario, where majority owner and president Christopher Grossman, a longtime radio sales manager, trainer and executive, was also a hotelier before purchasing his first radio station, CFBG in Bracebridge, in 1997.

HBG expanded greatly into Northern Ontario in 1999 by acquiring several stations from the Pelmorex Radio Network. In 2004, they also acquired CKNR in Elliot Lake, a station which had also once been part of Pelmorex but was sold to North Channel Broadcasting in 1996.

At its peak the company owned 24 English stations, mostly branded Moose FM. Some other stations such as CFBK-FM Huntsville use other brandings. They were generally formatted with adult contemporary or hot adult contemporary music; "Moose FM" Timmins was a country station before moving to adult hits. The company also formerly operated two French stations, branded as CHYC (pronounced like the French word chic), over a number of transmitters, but these were sold to Le5 Communications in 2008.

Haliburton's head office was in Toronto, Ontario, although most of its operations were based in Haliburton. Toronto-based Slaight Communications owned a significant minority interest in the group, which was not included in that company's 2007 sale of most of its broadcasting assets to Astral Media.

In 2006 and 2007, the company also expanded into Southwestern Ontario for the first time, launching a new station in Kincardine as a partial owner, and acquiring an existing station in Haldimand.

On May 20, 2010, Haliburton applied to the CRTC to acquire CJJM-FM in Espanola, which was owned by Joco Communications and received approval on August 12, 2010. Formerly branded as Joco Radio, the station was rebranded as Moose FM in September 2010. The company also announced subsequent deals to acquire CJJM's former sister station CFSF-FM in Sturgeon Falls, as well as CJCS and CHGK-FM in Stratford; these transactions were approved by the CRTC on February 21, 2011.

In late 2010, the company applied to buy two Niagara Falls radio stations, CKEY-FM and CFLZ-FM. Haliburton received approval on June 8, 2011.

On April 23, 2012 Vista Broadcast Group, which owns 38 radio stations in western Canada, announced a deal to acquire Haliburton Broadcasting, in cooperation with Westerkirk Capital, for $32.34 million. The transaction was approved by the CRTC on October 19, 2012.

In 2021, Grossman began a new company, Local Radio Lab, acquiring several Ontario stations owned by My Broadcasting Corporation.

== Strategy and competition ==
Haliburton's strategy has been based on the conversion of former AM radio stations to FM, adoption of generally more contemporary-oriented music formats, modest staffing levels, and economies of scale through shared voice tracking, production and advertising sales across the regional group.

CHNO in Sudbury was an AM oldies station when Haliburton acquired it from Pelmorex; a stipulation in the CRTC's approval of the transaction allowed it to move to FM. In 2000, it relaunched at 103.9 as a CHR/Top 40 station branded as Z103. After a short time, it was sold in 2001 to the larger Newcap Broadcasting for significantly more than it had been acquired for. The CRTC, wary of potential "license trafficking," accepted the sale on the grounds that Haliburton had been losing money with CHNO, and would reinvest the proceeds into its contemporaneous purchase of CKLP in Parry Sound.

CHMT in Timmins launched in 2001 as an adult contemporary station as Mix 93, but soon faltered under competition from CKGB, formerly an AM country station which adopted the "EZ Rock" adult contemporary brand and moved to FM shortly after CHMT launched. CHMT flipped to country about a year later, and eventually relented as had CHNO, abandoning its own sales staff and sharing sales with the two Rogers Media stations in Timmins.

On March 17, 2005, the CRTC published notice of an application Haliburton filed in 2004 to launch an FM country station in North Bay, which was approved on August 11, 2005. However, the North Bay station launched as an adult hits format in the summer of 2006, instead of the country music format the station originally proposed.

On April 7, 2005, they published notice of an application also filed in 2004 to launch an FM "adult contemporary rock" station in Haliburton itself. This license was also subsequently granted, and the station launched in 2006.

On August 4, 2010, Haliburton applied to operate a new FM radio station in Barry's Bay to operate at 106.5 MHz with an adult contemporary format. Haliburton received CRTC approval on January 12, 2011.

On December 13, 2010, Haliburton applied to operate a new FM radio station in Kemptville. The new station will operate on 97.5 MHz with an adult contemporary format. Haliburton received CRTC approval on April 21, 2011.

On May 19, 2011, Haliburton applied to operate a new FM radio station in Prescott. The new station would operate at 107.9 MHz with a hot adult contemporary format. Haliburton received CRTC approval on November 10, 2011.

On November 9, 2011, Haliburton submitted applications to the CRTC to acquire CJFB-FM in Bolton and CFGM-FM in Caledon. This was approved on March 14, 2012.

== Sale of holdings ==
In May 2008, Haliburton announced a deal to sell the CHYC stations to Le5 Communications, a firm owned by Sudbury lawyer Paul Lefebvre, for a purchase price of $425,000. The deal was approved by the CRTC on October 31, 2008.

On July 28, 2008, HBG announced that it had sold 12 stations to Newcap Broadcasting, subject to CRTC approval, for a price of $18.95 million. The Kincardine and Haldimand stations were not part of the deal, and their status was not disclosed at the time of the Newcap announcement. Newcap's formal application to acquire the stations was published for public hearings by the CRTC on November 13, 2008, but was subsequently withdrawn in January 2009. Newcap CEO Rob Steele indicated that in light of the credit market crisis, the company did not feel that it was the right time to increase its debt load.

In February 2009, Haliburton was part of a tentative deal to sell CIYN in Kincardine to My Broadcasting Corporation.

On October 19, 2012, the CRTC approved Vista Broadcast Group's application for authority to acquire Haliburton's AM and FM radio stations located in Ontario.

== Stations ==
At the time of Haliburton's acquisition by Vista in 2012, the company owned the following stations:

- Bancroft - CHMS-FM
- Barry's Bay - CHBY-FM
- Bolton - CJFB-FM
- Bracebridge - CFBG-FM
- Caledon - CFGM-FM
- Cochrane - CHPB-FM
- Elliot Lake - CKNR-FM
- Espanola - CJJM-FM
- Fort Erie - CFLZ-FM
- Haldimand - CKJN-FM
- Haliburton - CFZN-FM
- Huntsville - CFBK-FM
- Iroquois Falls - CFIF-FM
- Kapuskasing - CKAP-FM
- Kemptville - CKVV-FM
- Niagara Falls - CJED-FM
- North Bay - CFXN-FM
- Parry Sound - CKLP-FM
- Prescott - CKPP-FM
- Stratford - CJCS-FM, CHGK-FM
- Sturgeon Falls - CFSF-FM
- Timmins - CHMT-FM

=== Former stations ===
The following stations were owned by Haliburton in the past, but were sold to other owners prior to the company's final acquisition:

- Kincardine - CIYN-FM (sold to My Broadcasting Corporation in 2009)
- Sudbury - CHNO-FM (sold to Newcap Broadcasting in 2001), CHYC-FM (sold to Le5 Communications in 2008)
- Timmins - CHYK-FM (sold to Le5 Communications in 2008)
