= CHOW-FM =

Radio station in Amos, Quebec

Coordinates: 48°25′43″N 78°07′47″W

Amos, Quebec; Canada
- Frequency: 105.3 kHz
- Branding: Radio Boréale 105.3

Programming
- Language: French
- Format: Community radio

Ownership
- Owner: Radio Boréale

History
- First air date: 2009

Technical information
- Class: B
- ERP: 13.253 kW average 32.186 kW peak
- HAAT: 106.3 metres (349 ft)

Links
- Webcast: Listen Live
- Website: radioboreale.com

CHOW-FM is a Québécois radio station, which broadcasts a community radio format branded as Radio Boréale on 105.3 FM in Amos, Quebec.

Licensed by the Canadian Radio-television and Telecommunications Commission in October 2007, the station was scheduled to launch in 2008, but it officially began broadcasting in 2009. CHOW is owned by Radio Boréale.

The callsign CHOW was previously used by a radio station in Welland, Ontario from 1957 to 2005, now known as CIXL-FM.

On October 29, 2009, CHOW received CRTC approval to increase transmitter power from 5,376 watts to 17,787 watts.

The station is a member of the Association des radiodiffuseurs communautaires du Québec.

== Transmitters ==
On July 22, 2020, Radio Boreale submitted two applications to add two new FM transmitters to serve La Sarre at 106.1 MHz and Rouyn-Noranda at 104.9 MHz. On December 5, 2022, Radio Boréale resubmitted applications to add new FM transmitters at 106.1 MHz in La Sarre and 104.9 MHz in Rouyn-Noranda. On September 20, 2023, both applications by Radio Boréale to add new FM transmitters to serve La Sarre at 106.1 MHz and Rouyn-Noranda at 104.9 MHz were denied by the CRTC.
