= CHPB-FM =

Radio station in Cochrane, Ontario

Coordinates: 49°03′47″N 81°01′31″W

- Cochrane, Ontario; Canada
- Frequency: 98.1 MHz
- Branding: 98.1 Moose FM

Programming
- Format: Adult contemporary

Ownership
- Owner: Vista Broadcast Group
- Sister stations: CFIF-FM

History
- First air date: November 19, 2003

Technical information
- Class: LP
- ERP: 50 watts
- HAAT: 19 metres (62 ft)

Links
- Webcast: Listen Live
- Website: mycochranenow.com

CHPB-FM is a Canadian adult contemporary radio station broadcasting at 98.1 MHz on the FM dial in Cochrane, Ontario.

The station began broadcasting in 2003 under the ownership of Tri-Tel Communications. On November 19, 2003, the Haliburton Broadcasting Group was given approval to acquire CHPB-FM from Tri-Tel.

CHPB-FM is a sister station of CFIF-FM in Iroquois Falls. The station airs an adult contemporary format branded as 98.1 Moose FM.

On April 23, 2012 Vista Broadcast Group, which owns a number of radio stations in western Canada, announced a deal to acquire Haliburton Broadcasting Group, in cooperation with Westerkirk Capital. The transaction was approved by the CRTC on October 19, 2012.
