= CJCS-FM =

Radio station in Stratford, Ontario

Coordinates: 43.36637°N 80.96359°W

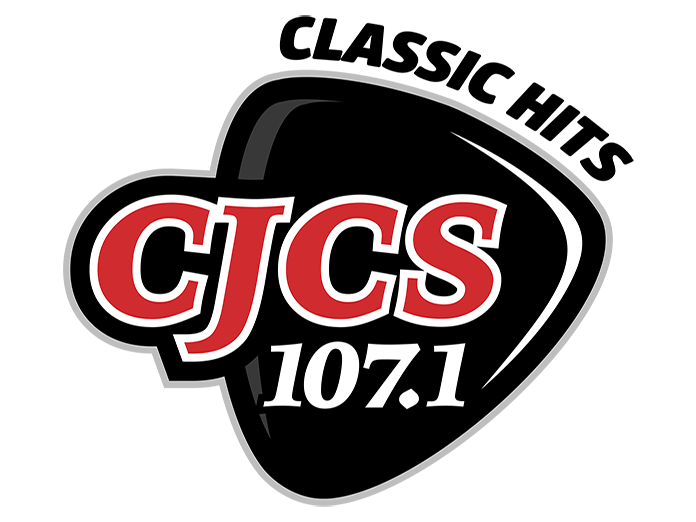
- Stratford, Ontario; Canada
- Broadcast area: Southwestern Ontario
- Frequency: 107.1 MHz
- Branding: 107.1 CJCS

Programming
- Format: Classic hits/Variety Hits

Ownership
- Owner: Vista Radio
- Sister stations: CHGK-FM

History
- First air date: 1928
- Former call signs: 10AK (1928–1935)
- Former frequencies: 1200 AM (1933–1936); 1210 AM (1936–1941); 1240 AM (1941–2017)

Technical information
- Class: A
- ERP: 900 watts average; 4,000 watts peak
- HAAT: 32.6 metres (107 ft)

Links
- Webcast: Listen Live
- Website: mystratfordnow.com/on-air/cjcs

CJCS-FM is a Canadian radio station in Stratford, Ontario broadcasting at 107.1 FM with a classic hits/variety hits format branded as 107.1 CJCS. The station is owned by Vista Radio. CJCS also broadcasts Toronto Blue Jays games.

The station, known as 10AK began broadcasting in 1928 as an amateur station at 250 metres. In 1933, the station changed to 1200 kHz, moved to 1210 in 1936 and then moved to 1240 on March 29, 1941. 10AK switched to its present callsign CJCS in 1935.

Lloyd Robertson, Bob Bratina and Tony Parsons all started their respective broadcasting careers at this station.

Over the years since the station began broadcasting in 1928, CJCS went through a number of different ownerships.

On May 11, 1990, the CRTC denied an application by Telemedia Communications to convert CJCS to 104.1 MHz.

On June 25, 1997, Raedio Inc., received approval from the Canadian Radio-television and Telecommunications Commission to acquire CJCS from Telemedia Communications.

CJCS was owned by Raedio Inc. and opened up a new FM sister station CHGK-FM on September 2, 2003.

In September 2010, Raedio Inc. announced a tentative deal, pending CRTC approval, to sell the station to Haliburton Broadcasting Group which received CRTC approval on February 21, 2011.

On April 23, 2012 Vista Broadcast Group, which owns a number of radio stations in western Canada, announced a deal to acquire Haliburton Broadcasting, in cooperation with Westerkirk Capital. The transaction was approved by the CRTC on October 19, 2012.

On January 23, 2015, Vista applied with the CRTC to convert CJCS to FM with an average effective radiated power (ERP) of 900 watts (maximum ERP of 4,000 watts with an effective height of antenna above average terrain of 32.6 metres). The application was approved on August 10, 2015.

On August 3, 2017, CJCS officially moved to 107.1 FM and relaunched as 107.1 Juice FM.

Due to its low ERP, CJCS-FM has co-channel interference with CILQ-FM in Toronto, Ontario which has a higher ERP.

On July 7, 2022, the station changed back to its old brand name, 107.1 CJCS.
