= L'Ami du peuple (Canadian newspaper) =

20th-century French-language newspaper in Canada

L'Ami du peuple was a French language weekly newspaper, published in Sudbury, Ontario from 1942 to 1968. Founded by Camille Lemieux and Arthur Charette, the newspaper covered local and national news, and discussed labour union and other issues of interest to Franco-Ontarians in the Sudbury area.

Charette left after the first year of operation; Lemieux continued to publish the newspaper until his death in 1955, when ownership was taken over by his widow Yvonne. The paper faced competition both from the Ottawa newspaper Le Droit, which made a short-lived attempt to expand into Northern Ontario in the 1960s, and from L'Information, the monthly French publication of the Roman Catholic Diocese of Sault Sainte Marie, Ontario. Several times in the 1950s and 1960s, due to financial constraints the paper published editions which repeated all of the same journalistic content as the previous week's issue, with only the date in the masthead changed. By 1968 the paper was nearly bankrupt, and Yvonne Lemieux sold it for just one dollar to the Centre des jeunes de Sudbury, which ceased general commercial distribution and converted the publication into its internal monthly newsletter.

Following the newspaper's demise, the new community newspaper Le Voyageur was launched the same year.
