= CIXL-FM =

Coordinates: 43°00′24″N 79°10′30″W

- Welland, Ontario; Canada
- Broadcast area: Niagara Region
- Frequency: 91.7 MHz
- Branding: Classic Rock 91.7 Giant FM

Programming
- Format: Classic rock
- Affiliations: Niagara IceDogs, Niagara River Lions

Ownership
- Owner: My Broadcasting Corporation; (CIXL-FM Welland)
- Sister stations: CKYY-FM

History
- First air date: June 4, 1957
- Former call signs: CHOW (1957–2005)
- Former frequencies: 1470 kHz (1957–1999)
- Call sign meaning: XL for "extra large", a synonym of station's "Giant" branding

Technical information
- Class: B
- ERP: 27,420 watts average vertical & horizontal polarization
- HAAT: 150 metres (490 ft)

Links
- Webcast: Listen live
- Website: giantfm.com

CIXL-FM is a Canadian radio station, broadcasting in Welland, Ontario. It uses the on-air brand name Classic Rock 91.7 Giant FM, and broadcasts a classic rock format at 91.7 MHz. It is one of the few commercial FM radio stations on its frequency that can be heard in the United States, where frequencies between 88.1 and 91.9 MHz are set aside for noncommercial stations (a stipulation not required in Canada, CIXL's originating country). CIXL's geographical position puts it in direct competition with Buffalo's WGRF, along with CFLZ-FM in Fort Erie and the CN Tower-transmitting CHBM-FM from Toronto.

Giant FM's studios are located on Forks Road on the Port Colborne–Welland line, with its transmitter located on Matthews Road in Welland.

== History ==
The station originally owned by Gordon W. Burnett's "Wellport Broadcasting Ltd." and was launched in June 1957 as CHOW (known on-air as "C-How,") located at 1470 kHz on the AM dial. A daytimer when it was originally launched, the station began offering nighttime service within a few months. It offered an easy listening format until 1975, when it switched to country.

In 1990, the CRTC denied Wellport Broadcasting's application for a new FM station at Port Colborne. Instead, a licence was given to CJFT in Fort Erie so that it could move to the FM band. In 1992, the CRTC once again denied Wellport's application for a new FM radio station at Port Colborne.

In 1994, the station was purchased by Suzanne Rochon-Burnett through numbered company 1019415 Ontario Inc., the first aboriginal woman in Canada to own a commercial radio station. Rochon-Burnett was later named to the Order of Canada. The station moved to 91.7 FM in 1999. and was rebranded as Spirit 91.7. In 1998, the station received CRTC approval to relocate CHOW-FM's transmitter and decreasing the effective radiated power from 27,420 watts to 25,000 watts.

The station was purchased by David Holgate in 2004. The following year, CHOW switched to an adult hits format, adopting its the CIXL call sign and branding. In late August 2008, the station adopted its current classic rock format, but retained the "Giant FM" branding. The call sign CHOW was recycled to "Radio Boréal", in Amos, Quebec. It was later given permission to increase ERP to 27,420 watts, once again.

On December 9, 2013, R.B Communications Ltd., the owner of CIXL, submitted an application to operate a new country music station at Welland at 89.1 MHz. The new station received CRTC approval on June 26, 2014.

On May 10, 2019, Stingray Group announced its purchase of R.B. Communications' two stations. The sale has since fallen through, and Wellport Broadcasting remains owner, for the time being. In 2022, Wellport announced a new deal to sell CIXL and CKYY to My Broadcasting Corporation.

On September 20, 2022, the CRTC approved the change of ownership from R.B. Communications Ltd. to My Broadcasting Corporation. The Giant FM name was expanded to Brockville on March 24, 2025, following My Broadcasting's purchase of CJPT 103.7, then later to Tilsonburg following the purchase of CKOT 101.3.

In April 2026, the station's morning host Darlene Check launched Darlene's School of Rock, a weekend show profiling the history of classic rock which also airs all of on My Broadcasting's other Giant FM-branded stations.
