= Northern Cable =

Northern Cable was a Canadian cable television provider, which operated from 1975 to 1998.

The company, based in Sudbury, Ontario, served most of the Northeastern Ontario region. Although CUC Broadcasting was the largest single shareholder, the company was structured to maintain corporate control within the region. F. Baxter Ricard, the largest local shareholder, was the company's chairman, with his wife Alma Ricard and cofounder Norman Bradley as the other primary shareholders.

The company was one of ten bidders for the original cable license to serve Sudbury, alongside competitors such as Maclean-Hunter, Bushnell Communications, Jarmain Teleservices, Trans-Video, Malo-Hosken, Cambrian Broadcasting, City Cablecasting and Huneault Cablecasting.

The company was also the primary shareholder in the region's MCTV and Mid-Canada Radio systems.

By 1989, the company was sending signals that due to Baxter Ricard's age and declining health and a developing ownership challenge at CUC, it was opening itself up to acquisition by larger companies, hiring business consultancy Thorne Ernst & Whinney to solicit bids. Bradley tentatively bought out CUC's shares in the company in 1989, with the deal to be financed by selling off the company's broadcast holdings. The deal also halted a pending application by the company to expand CHRO-TV, its station in Pembroke, into the larger Ottawa market.

In 1990, Northern sold MCTV to Baton Broadcasting, and Mid-Canada Radio to Pelmorex. In 1993, shortly after Baxter Ricard's death, Northern was acquired by CF Cable, although Northern remained a separate division of the company. The deal made CF Cable the fifth-largest cable operator in Canada.

In 1997, CF Cable sold its cable operations to Vidéotron. Northern Cable was sold the following year to Regional Cablesystems, which folded the company into its own operations and branding. Regional subsequently became Persona Communications in 2001, and Persona in turn was sold to EastLink in 2007. EastLink has, however, kept Northern Cable's former head office in Sudbury open as its divisional office for operations in Ontario.
