= CJJM-FM =

Coordinates: 46.2630°N 81.7670°W

- Espanola, Ontario; Canada
- Frequency: 99.3 MHz
- Branding: 99.3 Moose FM

Programming
- Format: Adult contemporary

Ownership
- Owner: Vista Broadcast Group

History
- First air date: 2008

Technical information
- Class: A
- ERP: vertical polarization only:.794 kWs average 1.41 kWs peak
- HAAT: 32.5 metres (107 ft)

Links
- Website: myespanolanow.com

CJJM-FM is a Canadian radio station, broadcasting at 99.3 FM in Espanola, Ontario. The station currently airs an adult contemporary format and is branded on-air as 99.3 Moose FM. The station is owned by Vista Radio.

== History ==
Originally owned by Joco Communications, the station was licensed by the CRTC on July 19, 2007.

CJJM began testing at 99.3 FM in late 2007 and officially began broadcasting in spring 2008. The station offered an adult contemporary/classic hits format with some specialty programming, similar to the format of Joco's CFSF-FM in Sturgeon Falls. However, unlike CFSF's bilingual format, CJJM broadcasts exclusively in English.

The launch of CJJM-FM 99.3 in Espanola is the areas first local FM radio station since an unrelated radio station CKNS AM 930 Espanola left the air in 1997 to be replaced by CKNR-FM Elliot Lake.

In May 2010, an application by Haliburton Broadcasting Group to acquire the station was received by the CRTC. This application was approved on August 12 of that year. Formerly branded as Joco Radio, the station was rebranded to 99.3 Moose FM in September 2010 with an adult hits format including some current hits. Joco subsequently sold CFSF-FM to Haliburton to a separate transaction in late 2010.

On April 23, 2012 Vista Broadcast Group, which owns a number of radio stations in western Canada, announced a deal to acquire Haliburton Broadcasting, in cooperation with Westerkirk Capital. The transaction was approved by the CRTC on October 19, 2012.
