= CHYC-FM =

Radio station in Sudbury, Ontario

Coordinates: 46°31′24″N 80°59′59″W

- Sudbury, Ontario; Canada
- Broadcast area: Greater Sudbury
- Frequency: 98.9 MHz
- Branding: Le Loup 98.9

Programming
- Format: Hot adult contemporary (French)

Ownership
- Owner: Le5 Communications
- Sister stations: CHYK-FM, CHYQ-FM

History
- First air date: December 8, 1957
- Former call signs: CFBR (1957–1990)
- Former frequencies: 550 kHz (1957–1969); 900 kHz (1969–2000)
- Call sign meaning: pronounced like the French word "chic"

Technical information
- Class: B1
- ERP: 4,620 watts
- HAAT: 181.9 metres (597 ft)

Links
- Website: leloupfm.com

CHYC-FM is a Canadian radio station, which broadcasts at 98.9 FM in Sudbury, Ontario. It broadcasts a francophone hot adult contemporary format for the city's Franco-Ontarian community. It is owned by Le5 Communications, and branded as Le Loup 98.9.

CHYC and its sister stations CHYK-FM in Timmins and CHYQ-FM in West Nipissing are the only francophone commercial stations programmed entirely in Ontario. Apart from commercials and local weather updates, the three stations now simulcast the same programming at virtually all times; although all three stations formerly produced their own individual morning shows and then each hosted a later daypart within a shared broadcast schedule for the remainder of the day, all of the stations are now programmed from Sudbury.

== History ==
The station first aired on December 8, 1957 as 550 AM CFBR, a sister station to CHNO and a private affiliate of Radio-Canada. CHNO had previously been a bilingual station; when CFBR went to air, CHNO became full-time English. The "FBR" in the station's callsign stood for F. Baxter Ricard, who owned the stations with his wife Alma Ricard. The licensing of CFBR, which took over the Radio-Canada affiliation from CHNO, made Ricard the first commercial broadcaster in Canada licensed to operate two AM radio stations in the same city.

In 1969, CFBR and CHNO swapped frequencies. CHNO took over the 550 AM signal, and CFBR moved to 900. CFBR remained a Radio-Canada affiliate until the launch of CBON in 1978, and adopted a pop standards format thereafter. After losing the Radio-Canada affiliation, for a time the station's remaining audience was so small that its co-ownership with CHNO, the city's dominant English radio station at the time, was the only thing keeping it afloat.

In 1985, Ricard sold CFBR, CHNO and CJMX to Mid-Canada Radio, although as a minority shareholder in that company he retained a partial ownership stake.

On January 3, 1990, the CRTC approved a corporate reorganization of the group of radio stations in northern Ontario, among them CHNO, CFBR and CJMX-FM into a new company “Ottawa Valley Broadcasting Co. Ltd.”

The station adopted its current call sign and format in 1990, after the three stations were acquired by Pelmorex Radio Network. Pelmorex sold the stations in 1998, when Telemedia acquired CJMX, and 1999, when Haliburton Broadcasting Group acquired CHYC and CHNO. Haliburton subsequently converted both stations to FM after receiving approval from the CRTC on August 31, 1999. In 2000, the stations first aired on FM and discontinued their old AM signals. CHYC moved to 98.9 FM in early 2000 and simulcast on AM 900, until it left the air on March 31 of that year after the licensee resolved a technical problem relating to the implementation of the new FM transmitter.

During CHYC's (formerly CFBR) existence on AM 900, the station had suffered some co-channel interference during the nighttime hours from 900 CHML Hamilton, making it unlistenable in the areas of Greater Sudbury including the outlying areas. CHYC never applied for any signal upgrades or frequency changes on the AM band until its move to FM 98.9 in 2000.

Haliburton subsequently sold CHNO to Newcap Broadcasting in 2001. Despite no longer having common ownership, CHYC and CHNO continued to operate from the same studio facility at 493 Barrydowne Road in Sudbury.

In 2008, Haliburton announced a deal to sell the CHYC stations to Le5 Communications, a firm owned by Sudbury lawyer Paul Lefebvre. This deal was approved by the CRTC on October 31, 2008.

Le5 Communications rebranded the station as Le Loup 98.9 in early 2009, and moved the station to new studios at 100 Brian McKee Lane in downtown Sudbury. Musician and actor Stéphane Paquette also joined the station as an afternoon host. He has since been succeeded in the afternoon slot by Dayv Poulin, his former bandmate in Les Chaizes Muzikales.

In 2011, Le5 Communications filed an application to change the station's authorized signal contours by increasing the effective radiated power from 1,400 to 4,620 watts (from class A to class B1) and by increasing the effective height of the antenna above average terrain from 165.3 to 181.9 metres). The CRTC approved Le5's application on September 28, 2011.

The company also purchased Sudbury's existing francophone community newspaper Le Voyageur in 2011.

Undated, CHYC-FM moved into their new studios at 336 Pine Street in Sudbury.

== Rebroadcasters ==
A community group in Chapleau, Formation Plus, holds an independent license to rebroadcast the signal of CHYC. This transmitter operates on 95.9 FM in Chapleau with the call sign CHAP-FM.
