= CJFB-FM =

Radio station in Bolton, Ontario

- Bolton, Ontario; Canada
- Broadcast area: Caledon
- Frequency: 102.7 MHz
- Branding: 102.7 Indie FM

Programming
- Format: Adult contemporary/adult album alternative

Ownership
- Owner: Local Radio Lab Inc.

History
- First air date: 2008
- Former frequencies: 105.5 MHz (2008–2015)

Technical information
- Licensing authority: CRTC
- Class: A
- ERP: 1,100 watts
- HAAT: 7 metres (23 ft)
- Transmitter coordinates: 43°52′46″N 79°44′18″W

Links
- Website: boltonnow.ca

CJFB-FM is a Canadian radio station that broadcasts a hybrid adult contemporary/adult album alternative format on 102.7 FM in Bolton, Ontario. The station is branded as 102.7 Indie FM.

== History ==
Rick Sargent, the owner of the station, was given approval by the Canadian Radio-television and Telecommunications Commission (CRTC) on October 15, 2007 to broadcast on the frequency 105.5 FM at Bolton. The new station will offer an eclectic adult contemporary music format that will feature pop, rock, country, folk, blues, jazz and classical music including local, Canadian, and emerging artists. CJFB-FM was also a community radio/tourist information station.

The station was branded as B105.5 or The B.

CJFB-FM's former logo as B105.5 from 2008 to 2012(?)

On April 9, 2008, the station submitted an application to convert CFGM-FM 102.7 in Caledon to a rebroadcaster of CJFB-FM. That application was denied on July 31, 2008.

On March 14, 2012, the CRTC approved the application by Haliburton Broadcasting Group Inc. for authority to acquire from Rick Sargent the assets of CJFB-FM and CFGM-FM, and for broadcasting licenses to continue the operation of the stations.

On April 23, 2012 Vista Broadcast Group, which owns a number of radio stations in western Canada, announced a deal to acquire Haliburton Broadcasting, in cooperation with Westerkirk Capital. The transaction was approved by the CRTC on October 19, 2012.

On May 4, 2015, Vista received approval from the CRTC to change the frequency of CJFB-FM to 102.7 MHz. The CRTC also approved a change the station's authorized contours by increasing the average effective radiated power (ERP) from 50 to 1,565 watts (maximum ERP from 50 to 4,000 watts), changing the antenna's radiation pattern from non-directional to directional and decreasing its effective height above average terrain (EHAAT) from 15.7 to -22 metres. Vista has also submitted a separate application to revoke the licence for CFGM-FM 102.7 MHz.

Vista Radio received extensions from the CRTC to April 15, 2020 and was given a third, and final, extension to October 15, 2020 to relocate CFJB-FM from 105.5 MHz to 102.7 MHz, and increase power from 50 to 1,100 watts.

CJFB-FM's former logo as 102.7 Moose FM from 2021 to 2025

In August 2021, Vista began on-air testing of the new signal, with an intent to re-launch CJFB-FM with a new format in September. On September 3, Vista relaunched CJFB-FM on its new signal as 102.7 Moose FM, adopting an adult hits format.

In 2024, Local Radio Lab announced an agreement to purchase the station pending CRTC approval. The application was approved on April 14, 2025.

CJFB-FM's former logo as FM 102 Bolton from May 2025 to December 2025

On May 27, 2025, Local Radio Lab rebranded CJFB to FM 102 Bolton with an Adult contemporary format.

On December 1, 2025, Local Radio Lab rebranded the station to a hybrid adult contemporary and adult album alternative format. The branding "102.7 Indie FM" is similar to sister station CIND-FM Indie88 in Toronto, though the stations run distinct music playlists.
