= CFBK-FM =

Radio station in Huntsville, Ontario

Coordinates: 45°19′44″N 78°57′55″W

- Huntsville, Ontario; Canada
- Broadcast area: Muskoka
- Frequency: 105.5 MHz
- Branding: 105.5 Moose FM

Programming
- Format: Adult hits

Ownership
- Owner: Vista Broadcast Group

History
- First air date: 1958
- Former frequencies: 590 kHz (AM) (1958–1961); 630 kHz (1961–1987)

Technical information
- Class: B
- ERP: 43,400 watts
- HAAT: 147 m

Links
- Webcast: Listen Live
- Website: mymuskokanow.com

CFBK-FM is a Canadian radio station that airs at 105.5 FM in Huntsville, Ontario with an adult hits format branded as 105.5 Moose FM.

CFBK can be heard as far north as North Bay, as far south as Washago, as far east as Bancroft, and as far west as Parry Sound. CFBK could be heard as far south as Innisfil in previous years, but it has been significantly impacted in the south due to interference from CIUX-FM, which began broadcasting in Uxbridge on the same frequency in 2015.

CFBK began broadcasting in 1958 as CKAR on the AM band at 590 kHz with a repeater in Parry Sound known as CKAR-1. In 1961, CKAR moved to 630 kHz and in 1977 became CFBK. In September 1987, the station converted to the FM band at 105.5 MHz and the old AM 630 frequency left the air for good on December 31 the same year.

CKAR was a former callsign of a radio station in Oshawa, known today as CKDO, and the CKAR callsign currently belongs to a community radio station in Huntsville known as Hunters Bay Radio 88.7 FM and a defunct television station in Armstrong, known as CHFD-TV.

Formerly owned by Muskoka-Parry Sound Broadcasting, the station's acquisition by Haliburton Broadcasting Group was approved by the CRTC on February 21, 2008.

CFBK's branding was 105.5 More-FM and changed to the 105.5 Moose FM branding after the acquisition by the Haliburton Broadcasting Group in 2008 and then changed to The New 105.5 FM, Muskoka's Lite Favourites with a new high-powered signal in April 2010. They were rebranded once again as 105.5 Moose FM in March 2013. In May 2014, the station changed their format to "World Class Rock". In 2015, the station changed to adult hits with "Huntsville's Biggest Variety" retaining the "Moose FM" branding.

On May 1, 2008, CFBK-FM applied to the CRTC to increase its effective radiated power from 5,000 watts to 43,400 watts and received CRTC approval on June 1, 2009.

On April 23, 2012, Vista Broadcast Group, which owns a number of radio stations in western Canada, announced a deal to acquire Haliburton Broadcasting Group, in cooperation with Westerkirk Capital. The transaction was approved by the CRTC on October 19, 2012.
