= CFSF-FM =

Radio station in Sturgeon Falls, Ontario, Canada

Coordinates: 46°22′29″N 79°55′28″W

- Sturgeon Falls, Ontario; Canada
- Broadcast area: West Nipissing
- Frequency: 99.3 MHz
- Branding: 99.3 Moose FM

Programming
- Format: Adult contemporary

Ownership
- Owner: Vista Broadcast Group

History
- First air date: 2003
- Call sign meaning: Coming From Sturgeon Falls

Technical information
- Class: A
- ERP: vertical polarization only: 1,350 watts
- HAAT: 48.5 metres (159 ft)

Links
- Webcast: Listen Live
- Website: mywestnipissingnow.com

CFSF-FM is a Canadian radio station, broadcasting at 99.3 FM in Sturgeon Falls, Ontario. The station airs an adult contemporary format branded on-air as 99.3 Moose FM. The station is owned by Vista Radio.

== History ==
On February 14, 2003, Joco Communications was given approval by the CRTC for a new FM radio service to serve the community of Sturgeon Falls. Under Joco Communications ownership, the station was branded as Joco Radio. The station began broadcasting in April 2003 with its studios located at 12006 Highway 17, Unit 7, in Sturgeon Falls. In 2005, the station was given approval to increase power to serve all of the Municipality of West Nipissing and outlying communities.

As the only commercial station in a small bilingual community, the station aired a variety of programming, including CHR, country and classic rock programs, in both English and French.

In September 2010, Joco Communications announced a tentative deal to sell the station to Haliburton Broadcasting Group, which received CRTC approval on February 21, 2011. Joco had already sold CFSF's former sister station CJJM-FM in Espanola to Haliburton earlier in the year.

In March 2011, the station was rebranded to Moose FM and adopted an adult contemporary format.

On April 23, 2012, Vista Broadcast Group, which owns a number of radio stations in western Canada, announced a deal to acquire Haliburton Broadcasting, in cooperation with Westerkirk Capital. The transaction was approved by the CRTC on October 19, 2012.

On May 11, 2012, the station changed the format and the slogan from "West Nipissing's Lite Favorite" to "Today's Hits and Yesterday's favorites".

In July 2014, the station was rebranded and changed its format from adult contemporary to a variety hits format.

In 2016, the station's studio at 204 King Street was damaged in a fire. Station staff were able to recover some of the station's equipment, and the station was back on the air later the same day from a temporary setup at the transmitter site.

Following a fire at 204 King Street, the 99.3 Moose FM studios moved to a new location at Unit 1, 159 Main Street in Sturgeon Falls.
