= F. Baxter Ricard =

Canadian media executive (1905–1993)

Félix Baxter Ricard (1905 – 1993) was a Canadian media proprietor.

Born in 1905 in Verner, Ontario, he moved to Sudbury in childhood with his father Félix Ricard, who became a hardware merchant in the city and a longtime trustee on the French-language school board. He married Alma Ricard in adulthood, and the couple took over management and operation of the store until moving into broadcasting.

In 1947, Ricard obtained a radio licence to establish CHNO in Sudbury, Ontario, the first bilingual radio station in Canada outside of Quebec. Ten years later, in 1957, he became the first commercial radio broadcaster in Canada licensed to operate two AM stations in the same city. CHNO became an all-English station, and Ricard's new CFBR became the new French outlet. A third station, CJMX, was established on FM in 1980.

In 1972, Baxter also launched Northern Cable, a cable television service for Northern Ontario. In 1980, Northern Cable became the major shareholder in MCTV, when Cambrian Broadcasting and J. Conrad Lavigne's broadcast holdings were merged for financial reasons.

Due to the CRTC's rules at the time on concentration of media ownership, Ricard's radio stations continued to operate as a separate corporation from Ricard's shares in MCTV, although they were later merged through Mid-Canada Radio in 1985. In 1990, Ricard's media holdings were sold off in a series of transactions: MCTV was acquired by Baton Broadcasting, Mid-Canada Radio was sold to Pelmorex, becoming the Pelmorex Radio Network, and Northern Cable was sold to CF Cable.

Ricard was also involved in the community as chairman of the Sudbury General Hospital board, as chairman of the city's 1960s urban renewal project to revitalize Downtown Sudbury, and as president of the local chamber of commerce and the local chapter of the Kiwanis Club. In 1980, he received a public service award from the Central Canada Broadcasters' Association, and in 1987 was awarded an honorary doctorate by Laurentian University. In 1990, he was named entrepreneur of the year by the Northern Ontario Business Awards.

Ricard died in Sudbury in 1993. Following his death, his widow Alma became a prominent philanthropist, and was inducted into the Order of Canada in 2000.

In 1999, he was posthumously inducted into the Canadian Association of Broadcasters Hall of Fame.
