= CFLZ-FM =

Radio station in Fort Erie, Ontario, Canada

Coordinates: 42°54′00″N 78°57′08″W

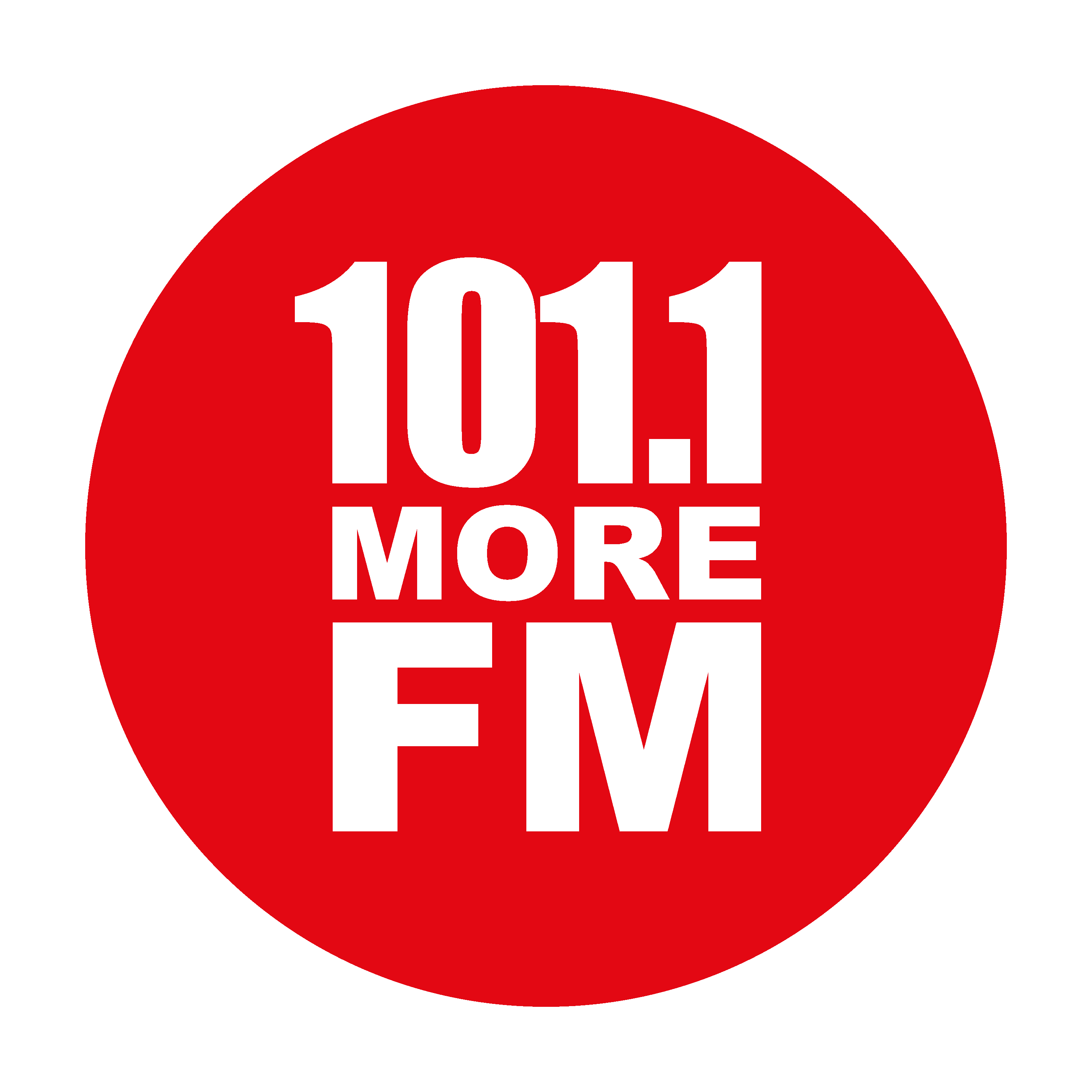
- Fort Erie, Ontario; Canada
- Broadcast area: Niagara Region, Western New York
- Frequency: 101.1 MHz
- Branding: 101.1 More FM

Programming
- Format: Adult hits

Ownership
- Owner: Byrnes Communications Inc.
- Sister stations: CJED-FM

History
- First air date: July 1, 1986
- Former call signs: CJFT (1986–1991); CKEY-FM (1991–2011)
- Former frequencies: 530 kHz (1986–1991)
- Call sign meaning: FLZ for "Falls", as in Niagara Falls

Technical information
- Class: B
- ERP: 50,000 watts
- HAAT: 76.5 metres (251 ft)

Links
- Webcast: Listen Live
- Website: 101morefm.ca

CFLZ-FM (101.1 MHz) is a commercial radio station in Fort Erie, Ontario, Canada, serving the Niagara Region and the Buffalo-Niagara Falls metropolitan area. It is owned by Byrnes Communications and it broadcasts an adult hits format, known as 101.1 More FM. CFLZ's studios and offices are on Ontario Avenue in Niagara Falls.

CFLZ-FM has an effective radiated power (ERP) of 50,000 watts. The transmitter is on Kraft Road in Fort Erie, near Ontario Highway 3.

== History ==
=== CJFT and CKEY-FM ===
The station was launched on July 1 (Canada Day), 1986, at 5:30 p.m. as AM 530 CJFT, playing a Top 40 format. Afternoon drive personality Alan Chonka signed CJFT on the air. It moved to FM in 1991, adopted the CKEY-FM call letters, and flipped to adult standards. (from 1945 to 1991, CKEY was the callsign of an AM radio station in Toronto, which now airs Chinese programming as Fairchild Radio affiliate CHKT.)

On August 26, 1994, at noon, the station switched to alternative rock as FM 101 The Planet. By 1996, the station shifted to dance music (similar to CING-FM in nearby Hamilton) while retaining the "Planet" moniker. It was an affiliate of "Pirate Radio" with Chris Sheppard.

On August 21, 1996, the Canadian Radio-television and Telecommunications Commission (CRTC) approved CJRN 710 Inc.'s application to increase CKEY-FM transmitter from 8,670 watts to 19,700 watts. The Commission also approved the application to amend the broadcasting licence for CKEY-FM by authorizing the licensee to add a transmitter at St. Catharines, operating on frequency 101.1 MHz (channel 266A) with an effective radiated power of 150 watts with a callsign CKEY-FM-1. The Commission notes that this transmitter has been operating on an experimental basis for some time and is a co-channel, synchronous repeater of CKEY-FM Fort Erie.

On November 14, 1997, the dance format was dropped in favour of a modern AC format (which later shifted to Hot AC), branded as The River. In 2001, a change of ownership of CJRN, CKEY-FM and CFLZ-FM to the Niagara Broadcasting Corporation was approved. The company would now be owned by several members of the Dancy family. On September 6, 2002, at 6 am, the Hot AC format moved to sister station CFLZ-FM, and CKEY adopted a rhythmic contemporary format branded as Wild 101

CKEY-FM had a joint sales agreement (JSA) with the U.S.-based radio broadcaster Citadel Broadcasting, under which it solicited advertising sales in the Buffalo, New York market (as part of its local cluster of stations) under a revenue sharing agreement. An intervention against the renewal of CKEY's licence was filed by a representative of a competing station in Buffalo, who accused the station of being programmed by Citadel in violation of CRTC regulations (which require all broadcast undertakings to be "operated in fact by the licensee itself"). CKEY stated that it also contracted some of Citadel's Buffalo personnel to produce programming overseen by its local staff, and denied that Citadel had assumed all of the station's operations.

The CRTC found that the JSA was in fact limited to advertising sales services paid for by the station, and that Citadel was not outright operating the station. However, the CRTC did take issue with the amount of locally-oriented news and information that the station was broadcasting.

=== Top 40 ===
By 2005, the station moved to its current Top 40 format, and later on, the station changed its branding to Z101 on April 1, 2007. It was the only "Wild"-branded station in Canada. On December 19, 2005, the CRTC approved the transfer of ownership and control of CJRN 710 Inc. (CJRN Niagara Falls, CKEY-FM Fort Erie and CKEY-FM-1 St. Catharines) from Niagara Broadcasting Corp. (controlled by David Dancy) to Northguard Capital Corp. (owned and controlled by Andrew Ferri). This approval also covered the transfer to Northguard of 788813 Ontario Inc. (CFLZ-FM Niagara Falls), once it became a wholly owned subsidiary of CJRN 710 Inc. Northguard would then amalgamate both entities to continue the operation of the undertakings under the name, CJRN 710 Inc. 2005-1146-1 (December 19, 2005)

The CRTC has continued to express concern with CKEY's programming, calling attention in particular to the station's seeming failure to comply with its licence condition requiring a minimum three hours per week of locally oriented news programming. In its 2007 licence renewal, the station was only granted a two-year licence period.

=== Z-101 ===
CFLZ-FM-era Z101.1 logo

CKEY was a reporter to the American Rhythmic Top 40 panel on Mediabase and Nielsen BDS (and also reported on the Canadian top 40 panel on Nielsen BDS), but in 2005, CKEY-FM moved to the American Top 40 panel on Mediabase and Nielsen BDS. The station has continued to lean rhythmic even after shifting to mainstream top 40. Another station, CKBT-FM in Kitchener (which debuted as Rhythmic Top 40 in 2004, only to go top 40 in 2007), retains the rhythmic lean. Just like similar stations CIDC-FM-Toronto and CKHZ-FM-Halifax, the station pronounces it "Zee" instead of "Zed". In the case of CFLZ, the station is most likely using the American pronunciation due to the station primarily serving Buffalo at this time (but would later shift its focus to the Niagara Region).

In 2010, the Haliburton Broadcasting Group applied to buy CKEY-FM and sister station CFLZ-FM. The transaction received approval on June 8, 2011.

On August 24, 2011, the station dropped the rhythmic lean entirely and adopted a more mainstream playlist. The station also unveiled a new logo, and will continue to report as CHR per Mediabase and Nielsen BDS. As of November 2011, CKEY was moved to the Mediabase Canadian CHR panel from the U.S. CHR panel as it still reports as a Buffalo station, but it must register as a St. Catharines station.

In late 2011, the station adopted the CFLZ-FM callsign which had been used by its sister station, now known as CJED-FM. As the station's signal has always targeted the Buffalo market and does not fully cover the Niagara Region, the station applied to the CRTC and received approval to deploy a co-channel repeater (CFLZ-FM-1) that is located in south St. Catharines.

On April 23, 2012, Vista Broadcast Group, which owns a number of radio stations in western Canada, announced an agreement to acquire the station and CJED-FM from Haliburton Broadcasting, in cooperation with Westerkirk Capital. The transaction was approved by the CRTC on October 19, 2012.

As a result of ongoing issues with the St. Catharines repeater causing interference, Vista had filed an application with the CRTC to take it off the air and remove it from the licence.

=== 2Day FM ===
Logo as 2Day FM, 2013–2016

On September 20, 2013, at noon, after playing "This Is What It Feels Like" by Armin van Buuren, CFLZ shifted its brand to the 2Day FM brand, simulcasting with sister station CJED-FM. The first song on "2Day" was "Blurred Lines" by Robin Thicke.

In May 2014, the licence for CFLZ-FM's repeater (CFLZ-FM-1 101.1 MHz) in St. Catharines was revoked. Vista says the transmitter was shut down last September.

Logo while branded as "Juice FM"

On April 30, 2014, Vista filed an application with the CRTC to amend the station's broadcasting licence. On December 8, 2014, the CRTC denied the application and cited Vista for being in non-compliance with various conditions of the licence including converting the station to a full-time rebroadcasting transmitter for CJED-FM without prior approval by the commission. New conditions were placed upon the licensee. CFLZ-FM was taken off the air shortly thereafter. It was returned to air on December 19, 2014, apparently continuing to simulcast to CJED-FM.

=== Juice FM ===
On July 15, 2016, at 6:13 am, CFLZ discontinued simulcasting CJED-FM and switched to Vista Radio's "Juice" format, broadcasting an adult hits format consisting of hits from the 1980s to today. On January 15, 2018, Byrnes Communications Inc. acquired CFLZ and sister station CJED-FM with approval from the CRTC. Byrnes Communications took control of CFLZ on February 1, 2018.

=== More FM ===
On March 1, 2018, the station re-branded as 101.1 More FM, playing songs from the 1970s, 1980s and 1990s. Because of the station's programming, CFLZ competes with WHTT-FM, WBUF and WGRF in Buffalo and CIXL-FM in Welland.

In September 2019, CFLZ announced that their signal might be temporarily weakened due to transmitter work. The work would be done to improve the present transmitter and allow CFLZ to broadcast at 50,000 Watts full-time. At the time of the announcement, the only "50,000 Watters" in the area were CHTZ-FM and CHRE-FM.

In February 2020, Byrnes announced that it would enter into an advertising sales partnership with Radio One Buffalo—owner of oldies station WECK—to sell advertising for CFLZ and CJED in Buffalo.
