= Le Voyageur =

Canadian newspaper in Ontario

- Type: Weekly newspaper
- Owner(s): Le5 Communications
- Publisher: Paul Lefebvre
- Editor: Julien Cayouette
- Founded: June 12, 1968
- Headquarters: Sudbury, Ontario
- Website: www.levoyageur.ca

Le Voyageur is a weekly community newspaper in Greater Sudbury, Ontario, serving the city's Franco-Ontarian community.

== History ==
The newspaper was launched on June 12, 1968, shortly after the demise of the region's earlier francophone community newspaper L'Ami du peuple, and is distributed throughout Northeastern Ontario.

In 2008, the paper hosted the national conference of the Association de la presse francophone du Canada. In 2009, the paper expanded its web presence to publish daily news updates. Then-editor Pascale Castonguay was also selected by the Alliance des radios communautaires du Canada and the Association de la presse francophone du Canada as a correspondent covering the 2010 Winter Olympics for over 250 francophone newspapers and radio stations across Canada.

In 2011, the paper was purchased from its prior owners, Carole Dubé and Réjean Grenier, by Le5 Communications, the owner of the city's francophone radio station CHYC-FM. The transaction also made it a sister publication to L'Express de Timmins, which was launched by Le5 in 2010.

In 2013, Le5 merged the two publications into an expanded region-wide newspaper, covering Sudbury, Timmins, Chapleau, Wawa, Cochrane, Iroquois Falls, Kapuskasing, Hearst, West Nipissing, French River and the Timiskaming region, under the banner Le Voyageur — La voix du Nord.

== See also ==
- List of newspapers in Canada
