= Le5 Communications =

Canadian media company

- Company type: Private
- Industry: Media
- Founded: Sudbury, Ontario (2008)
- Headquarters: Sudbury, Ontario
- Key people: Paul Lefebvre; President / CEO
- Products: Broadcasting, publishing

Le5 Communications is a Canadian media company. Based in Sudbury, Ontario, the company operates radio stations and newspapers in the Northeastern Ontario region. The company operates the only francophone commercial radio stations in Ontario which originate their own programming; with the exception of one station in Eastern Ontario which primarily rebroadcasts a station from Montreal with only a few hours per week of original programming, all other francophone stations in the province are public or community radio stations operated by non-profit groups or Radio-Canada.

Owned and operated by Paul Lefebvre, at the time a lawyer with the Sudbury firm of Weaver, Simmons, the company was incorporated in 2008 after Lefebvre reached a deal with Haliburton Broadcasting Group to acquire the company's francophone radio stations in Sudbury and Timmins for $425,000. The deal was approved by the CRTC on October 31, 2008.

The company's name is a pun on Lefebvre's surname. If the numeral 5 is pronounced as in English (i.e. "five" rather than "cinq"), the company's name is very close to the French pronunciation of Lefebvre.

== History ==
Although originally established by separate owners in the 1950s, CHYC-FM in Sudbury and CHYK-FM in Timmins had been under common ownership since their acquisition by Mid-Canada Radio in 1985. The stations were acquired by the Pelmorex Radio Network in 1990, and subsequently by Haliburton in 1999, before Le5 acquired the stations in 2008.

On August 4, 2010, Le5 Communications applied to operate a new French-language FM radio station in West Nipissing, operating at 97.1 MHz with an adult pop-music format. The company received approval to operate the new station on January 6, 2011.

On March 28, 2015, Lefebvre was chosen as the Liberal Party of Canada's candidate for the Sudbury riding in the 2015 federal election. He won the seat in the 2015 election. The company subsequently operated in a blind trust, for compliance with parliamentary conflict of interest regulations.

== Holdings ==
=== Radio ===
- Sudbury - CHYC-FM
- Timmins - CHYK-FM
- West Nipissing - CHYQ-FM

All three stations are branded as Le Loup, and air common programming for the most part. Each station formerly produced its own distinct morning show, but for the remainder of the day each station was the host studio to at least one daypart within a shared region-wide simulcast, though the three stations aired separate identifications and commercials. Programming has since been centralized so that all three stations now broadcast virtually identical programming at all times, predominantly produced in Sudbury except for some syndicated programming; as of 2020, the only locally targeted programming that remains separate on the three stations is local weather updates.

The Timmins station CHYK-FM formerly operated rebroadcasters in Kapuskasing and Hearst, which were decommissioned in 2016, and a community group holds a separate license to rebroadcast the Sudbury station in Chapleau.

=== Newspapers ===
The company launched L'Express de Timmins, a weekly francophone community newspaper in Timmins, in 2010. In 2011, it also purchased Sudbury's existing francophone community newspaper Le Voyageur. In 2013, L'Express de Timmins and Le Voyageur merged to form Le Voyageur La voix du Nord, with expanded coverage throughout the Northeastern Ontario region.

== Controversy ==
Although it was not opposed to Le5's application to take over ownership of CHYC, Le Voyageur (which was still owned by a different company at that time) published an editorial in 2008 criticizing the CRTC for its handling of the application process. The paper took issue with the fact that the CRTC's original notice of hearing was not published in any of the region's local media, but only in the Ottawa newspaper Le Droit, a publication with very limited readership in the Sudbury or Timmins areas — thereby giving the region's Franco-Ontarian community little notice of either the pending transaction or the deadlines for reviewing and submitting comments regarding the application.
