= CBBX-FM =

Radio station in Sudbury, Ontario, Canada

- Sudbury, Ontario; Canada
- Broadcast area: Northeastern Ontario
- Frequency: 90.9 MHz

Programming
- Language: French
- Format: Public Music
- Network: Ici Musique

Ownership
- Owner: Société Radio-Canada
- Sister stations: CBON-FM, CBBS-FM, CBCS-FM

History
- First air date: April 20, 2001
- Call sign meaning: Canadian Broadcasting Corporation BX

Technical information
- Class: B
- ERP: 50,000 watts
- HAAT: 120.9 metres (397 ft)
- Transmitter coordinates: 46°30′14″N 80°58′03″W

Links
- Website: ICI Musique

CBBX-FM is a Canadian radio station. It broadcasts the Société Radio-Canada's Ici Musique network at 90.9 FM in Sudbury, Ontario.

== History ==
The station was originally licensed by the CRTC in 1984. However, due to financial constraints at the CBC, the station was never launched, and the CBC was forced in 1991 to surrender all of its non-operating licenses. Some sources may incorrectly cite the station's call sign as CBOS-FM, the call sign that was assigned to the unlaunched 1984 license.

The CBC subsequently applied for a new license, which was awarded in 2000. The station went on the air on April 20, 2001, approximately one month after the launch of CBC Radio 2's CBBS-FM.

On June 29, 2007, the CBC was given approval to add a rebroadcaster of CBBX in Timmins on 105.7 MHz. As of 2015, however, the Timmins transmitter has not been launched, and due to recent funding cutbacks at the CBC its launch appears unlikely. On March 30, 2015, Eternacom, the owners of the Christian radio station CJTK-FM Sudbury, received CRTC approval to add a new FM transmitter at Timmins to operate at 105.5 MHz, which is first-adjacent to the unbuilt rebroadcaster of CBBX-FM.

In long-term expansion plans that the CBC has filed with the CRTC, the station was also slated to add rebroadcasters in Hearst, Kapuskasing and North Bay, although no firm timeframe for this service expansion has been announced.
