= CBON-FM =

Radio station in Sudbury, Ontario, Canada

- Sudbury, Ontario; Canada
- Broadcast area: Northern Ontario
- Frequency: 98.1 MHz

Programming
- Format: News-Talk
- Network: Ici Radio-Canada Première

Ownership
- Owner: Canadian Broadcasting Corporation
- Sister stations: CBBS-FM, CBBX-FM, CBCS-FM

History
- First air date: July 21, 1978
- Call sign meaning: Canadian Broadcasting Corporation Ontario Nord; call sign is pronounced as c'est bon ("it's good")

Technical information
- Class: B
- ERP: 50,000 watts
- HAAT: 120.9 metres (397 ft)

Links
- Website: Ici Radio-Canada Première

CBON-FM (98.1 MHz) is a non-commercial French-language public radio station in Sudbury, Ontario. It airs the programming of Société Radio-Canada's Ici Radio-Canada Première network. The station also serves much of Northern Ontario through a network of relay transmitters.

== History ==
On July 28, 1975, the Canadian Broadcasting Corporation received approval from the Canadian Radio-television and Telecommunications Commission (CRTC) to operate a new French-language FM station at Sudbury, on the frequency 98.1 MHz.

Prior to the station's launch in 1978, Radio-Canada programming was carried on private network affiliate CFBR. The CRTC decision authorizing the launch of CBON-FM in fact encouraged, but did not direct, Radio-Canada to retain an AM frequency for its news/talk radio network, and to reserve CBON-FM for its music network. However, the station launched in 1978 as an affiliate of the news/talk network after the CBC was unable to negotiate an agreement with F. Baxter Ricard to directly acquire CFBR. Prior to CBON-FM's sign-on, CJBC Toronto was simulcast on most of the rebroadcast transmitters across northern Ontario.

Radio-Canada's music network was not available in the city until the launch of CBBX-FM in 2001, although from 1984 to 1991 the CBC held an unused license to launch that station.

== Programming ==
The station's regional morning program is Le matin du Nord, weekdays from 6 a.m. to 9 a.m., and its regional afternoon program is Jonction 11-17, weekdays from 3:30 p.m. to 6 p.m. On Saturday mornings, the station airs the province-wide morning program À échelle humaine, also heard on CJBC, as well as CBEF in Windsor.

On all public holidays,Pas comme d'habitude from CJBC Toronto is heard province-wide (except Ottawa) from 3 p.m. to 6 p.m. On some holidays, Y'a pas deux matins pareils from CJBC or Le matin du Nord from CBON airs on both stations, but on some others holidays, both stations air their local shows as usual or both stations air Matins sans frontières from CBEF Windsor.

Denis St-Jules was a longtime host of local programming on the station from its inception in 1978 until his retirement in 2008.

== Transmitters ==
Rebroadcasters of CBON-FM
City of licence	Identifier	Frequency	Power	Class	RECNet	CRTC Decision	Notes
Blind River	CBON-6	1010 AM	40 watts	LP	Query	2017-245	46°11′22.92″N 82°57′54″W
Chapleau	CBON-FM-28	91.9 FM	345 watts	A	Query	86-733	47°51′2.16″N 83°25′19.92″W
Dubreuilville	CBON-FM-11	97.9 FM	50 watts	LP	Query	89-763	48°20′48.84″N 84°32′31.92″W
Elliot Lake	CBON-FM-5	101.7 FM	2,640 watts	B	Query	88-641	46°23′17.16″N 82°37′12″W
Espanola	CBON-FM-7	94.9 FM	520 watts	A	Query	88-643	46°19′21″N 81°47′53.88″W
Geraldton	CBON-FM-22	93.7 FM	6,400 watts	B	Query		49°43′46.92″N 86°43′55.92″W
Gogama	CBON-FM-21	104.9 FM	6,900 watts	B	Query		47°48′56.16″N 81°35′45.96″W
Hearst	CBON-FM-26	90.3 FM	8,340 watts	B1	Query	85-1279	49°38′47.04″N 83°30′33.12″W
Kapuskasing	CBON-FM-24	90.7 FM	43,900 watts	B	Query		49°17′47.04″N 82°11′8.88″W
Kirkland Lake	CBON-FM-1	93.7 FM	2,650 watts	A	Query	96-780	48°4′23.16″N 80°0′33.12″W
Manitouwadge	CBON-FM-23	96.9 FM	143 watts	A	Query		49°8′16.08″N 85°50′13.92″W
Marathon	CBON-FM-29	102.3 FM	2023 watts	B	Query	2007-390	48°45′11.16″N 86°34′53.04″W
Mattawa	CBON-12	1090 AM	40 watts	LP	Query	70-174 (page 199) July 24, 1970	46°18′48.96″N 78°43′17.04″W
Nipigon	CBON-FM-19	97.3 FM	2,000 watts	B	Query		48°58′18.12″N 88°18′24.12″W
North Bay	CBON-FM-17	95.1 FM	100,000 watts	C	Query		46°18′12.96″N 79°24′30.96″W
Sault Ste. Marie	CBON-FM-18	88.1 FM	3,590 watts	B	Query		46°35′44.16″N 84°16′54.84″W
Temiskaming Shores	CBON-FM-2	99.7 FM	780 watts	A	Query	96-781	47°22′33.96″N 79°40′30″W
Thunder Bay	CBON-FM-20	89.3 FM	27,400 watts	B	Query		48°33′2.16″N 89°13′24.96″W
Timmins	CBON-FM-25	97.1 FM	44,800 watts	B	Query	82-356 (page 31) April 26, 1982	48°28′14.16″N 81°17′48.12″W
Wawa	CBON-FM-27	90.7 FM	890 watts	A	Query	85-1278	48°1′13.08″N 84°45′3.96″W

=== AM to FM and technical information ===
On February 28, 2017, the CBC submitted an application to convert CBON-6 1010 to 98.5 MHz. The callsign CBON-FM-6 was chosen for the new FM transmitter. The CRTC approved the CBC's application to move CBON-6 to 98.5 MHz on July 11, 2017. ISED Canada's records, however, state that the station remains on AM.

In 2017, the CBC surrendered its licence for the low-power AM rebroadcaster CBON-10 1110 Matachewan. This makes CBON-12 Mattawa one of the last remaining low-power AM transmitters to rebroadcast CBON-FM Sudbury. No plans have been announced to either convert the Mattawa transmitter to the FM band or shutdown completely.

On August 19, 2021, the CRTC approved the CBC's application to increase the average effective radiated power (ERP) for CBON-FM-5 at 101.7 MHz Elliot Lake from 1,000 to 7,245 watts (maximum ERP from 2,640 to 17,622 watts), increasing the effective height of the antenna above average terrain from 141.0 to 165.3 metres.

On October 6, 2026, the CRTC approved an application by the CBC to delete the low-power rebroadcasting AM transmitter, CBON-6 (1010 kHz) at Blind River. The FM signal of CBON-FM-5 heard at 101.7 MHz in Elliot Lake currently provides adequate coverage to the Blind River area previously served by the low-power AM transmitter, CBON-6 Blind River.
