= CBBS-FM =

Radio station in Sudbury, Ontario, Canada

- Sudbury, Ontario; Canada
- Broadcast area: Greater Sudbury
- Frequency: 90.1 MHz

Programming
- Language: English
- Format: Adult contemporary/Public music
- Network: CBC Music

Ownership
- Owner: Canadian Broadcasting Corporation
- Sister stations: CBCS-FM, CBBX-FM, CBON-FM

History
- First air date: March 29, 2001
- Call sign meaning: Canadian Broadcasting Corporation B Sudbury

Technical information
- Class: B
- ERP: 50 kW
- HAAT: 120.9 metres (397 ft)
- Transmitter coordinates: 46.5039°N 80.9675°W

Links
- Website: CBC Sudbury

CBBS-FM is a Canadian radio station, which broadcasts the Canadian Broadcasting Corporation's CBC Music network on 90.1 FM in Sudbury, Ontario.

The station was originally licensed by the CRTC in 1984. However, due to financial constraints at the CBC, the station was never launched, and the CBC was forced in 1991 to surrender all of its non-operating licenses. The license surrender left Sudbury as one of the largest cities in all of Canada not served by the CBC's music network.

The CBC subsequently applied for a new license, which was awarded in 2000, and the station launched on March 29, 2001. The network's Take Five, hosted by Shelley Solmes, broadcast from the Art Gallery of Sudbury the day of the station's launch.

== Transmitters ==
At present, the station only broadcasts in Sudbury. In long-term expansion plans that the CBC has filed with the CRTC, the station was slated to add rebroadcasters in Elliot Lake, Iron Bridge, Kapuskasing, Little Current, North Bay, Sault Ste. Marie, Temiskaming Shores, Timmins and Wawa; however, no firm timeframe for this service expansion has been announced.
