= CBCS-FM =

CBC Radio One station in Ontario, Canada

- Sudbury, Ontario; Canada
- Broadcast area: Northeastern Ontario
- Frequency: 99.9 MHz

Programming
- Language: English
- Format: News/Talk
- Network: CBC Radio One

Ownership
- Owner: Canadian Broadcasting Corporation
- Sister stations: CBBS-FM, CBBX-FM, CBON-FM

History
- First air date: May 5, 1978
- Call sign meaning: Canadian Broadcasting Corporation Sudbury

Technical information
- Class: B
- ERP: 50,000 watts
- HAAT: 120.9 metres (397 ft)
- Transmitter coordinates: 46°30′14″N 80°58′03″W

Links
- Website: CBC Sudbury

CBCS-FM is a Canadian radio station. It is the CBC Radio One station in Sudbury, Ontario, broadcasting at 99.9 FM, and serves all of Northeastern Ontario through its network of relay transmitters. The station's studio is located at the CBC/Radio-Canada facilities at 43 Elm Street in Sudbury.

== History ==
On July 28, 1975, the Canadian Broadcasting Corporation received approval from the CRTC to operate a new English-language FM station at Sudbury, Ontario. The proposed frequency was 97.1 MHz (later read 99.9 MHz when launched).

The station was launched on May 5, 1978 on 99.9 MHz. Prior to its launch, CBC Radio programming aired on private affiliates CKSO and CKSO-FM.

The CRTC decision authorizing the launch of CBCS in fact encouraged, but did not direct, the CBC to retain an AM frequency for CBC Radio, and to reserve CBCS for its CBC Stereo network. However, the station launched in 1978 as an affiliate of the talk network after the CBC was unable to negotiate an agreement with Cambrian Broadcasting to directly acquire CKSO.

The CBC later applied for a second license for its Stereo network, which was granted in 1984. However, that station remain unlaunched throughout the 1980s, and the CBC was forced in 1991 to surrender all of its non-operating licenses. Consequently, CBC Radio 2 service was not available in the city until the launch of CBBS-FM in 2001.

In the CBC's service reductions announced in March 2009, CBCS was slated to lose half of its existing staff. Several hundred people attended a rally at the city's Tom Davies Square on April 5 to protest the cutbacks, with participants including federal MPs Glenn Thibeault, Claude Gravelle and Charlie Angus, and musicians Kevin Closs and Stéphane Paquette.

In September 2014, the station announced that it would move in late 2015 from 15 Mackenzie Street, where it had been located since its launch in 1978, to a new leased studio and office space on Elm Street. The move was completed in December 2015. The CBC had an open house in September 2016. The former studio on Mackenzie Street was then rented out to Siena Films as the police station in the 2017 drama series Cardinal.

== Local programming ==
The station's local programs are Morning North, hosted by Markus Schwabe, and Up North, hosted by Jonathan Pinto, in the afternoon. In May 2009, Morning North won the Radio and Television News Directors Association's Peter Gzowski Award for Best Information Radio Program in Central Canada, and in June 2009, the program won the award for all of Canada.

The CBC announced in August 2014 that Up North, which premiered on August 11, would replace the former afternoon program Points North. The new program extends its coverage to all of Northern Ontario, also replacing Voyage North on CBQT-FM in Thunder Bay.

Former Points North host Dan Lessard retired from the program in June 2010. He was replaced by Jason Turnbull, who served as host of Points North, and then of Up North, until leaving the station in 2018 to take a job in media relations with Health Sciences North. Turnbull, in turn, was succeeded by Waubgeshig Rice, who hosted the show until leaving the CBC in May 2020. Jonathan Pinto was named the new host of the program, effective September 2020.

In the CBC's proposed new regional programming strategy released in 2005, North Bay was scheduled to receive its own local news bureau, although North Bay would continue to receive CBCS' local programming apart from news updates. As of 2024, however, no separate local news service has been launched in North Bay.

== Rebroadcasters ==
Rebroadcasters of CBCS-FM
City of licence	Identifier	Frequency	Power	Class	RECNet	CRTC Decision	Notes
Attawapiskat	CBCA-FM	101.5 FM	34 watts	A1	Query		52°55′35.04″N 82°25′23.88″W
Britt	CBEZ-FM	107.7 FM	49 watts	LP	Query	91-60	45°45′54″N 80°33′55.08″W
Chapleau	CBCU-FM	89.9 FM	345 watts	A	Query	86-732	47°51′2.16″N 83°25′19.92″W
Elk Lake	CBCG-FM	89.7 FM	116 watts	A1	Query	84-574	47°43′9.84″N 80°19′55.92″W
Elliot Lake	CBEC-FM	90.3 FM	264 watts	A	Query	88-865	46°23′17.16″N 82°37′12″W
Foleyet	CBLF	1450 AM	40 watts	LP	Query		48°14′16.08″N 82°26′4.92″W
Fort Albany	CBCI-FM	102.3 FM	2,400 watts	A	Query		52°12′27″N 81°41′17.88″W
Hearst	CBCC-FM	91.9 FM	8,340 watts	B1	Query		49°38′47.04″N 83°30′33.12″W
Kapuskasing	CBOK-FM	105.1 FM	43,900 watts	B	Query		49°17′47.04″N 82°11′8.88″W
Kirkland Lake	CBCR-FM	90.3 FM	2,650 watts	A	Query	84-575	48°4′23.16″N 80°0′33.12″W
Little Current	CBCE-FM	97.5 FM	21,000 watts	B	Query	82-304 (page 6)	45°56′0.96″N 81°59′31.92″W
Mattawa	CBLO	1240 AM	40 watts	LP	Query	70-173	46°18′48.96″N 78°43′17.04″W
Moosonee	CBEY-FM	99.9 FM	135 watts	A1	Query	2016-233	51°16′31.08″N 80°38′56.04″W
North Bay	CBCN-FM	96.1 FM	100,000 watts	C	Query		46°18′12.96″N 79°24′30.96″W
Sault Ste. Marie	CBSM-FM	89.5 FM	46,000 watts	B	Query		46°35′44.16″N 84°16′54.84″W
Temagami	CBCS-FM-1	106.1 FM	50 watts	LP	Query	2014-570	47°4′8.04″N 79°47′16.08″W
Temiskaming Shores	CBCY-FM	102.3 FM	780 watts	A	Query	96-723	47°22′33.96″N 79°40′30″W
Timmins	CBCJ-FM	96.1 FM	44,800 watts	B	Query	82-357 (page 31 and 32) April 26, 1982	48°28′14.16″N 81°17′48.12″W
Wawa	CBLJ-FM	88.3 FM	4,807 watts	B1	Query		48°1′13.08″N 84°45′3.96″W

=== AM to FM and technical information ===
On June 15, 1982, the CRTC approved the CBC's application to change CBOK-FM's frequency in Kapuskasing from 89.7 MHz to 105.1 MHz. On the same date, the CRTC also approved a change of frequency for CBCC-FM Hearst from 91.7 MHz to 91.9 MHz.

On January 22, 1985, the CRTC approved the CBC's application to move CBLQ Latchford (Temiskaming Shores) from 1450 kHz to 750 kHz. The change to 750 kHz in Latchford was never implemented, due to possible interference from CKGB Timmins, which had moved to 750 kHz in 1984. CBLQ remained on 1450 in Latchford until it moved to 102.3 MHz on the FM band in 1996 as CBCY-FM.

On October 25, 2013, the CRTC approved the CBC's application to decrease the power of CBLJ-FM from 50,000 watts to 4,807 watts, combined with an increase in the effective height of antenna above average terrain (EHAAT) from 114.6 to 132.6 metres.

On July 4, 2014, the CBC submitted an application to convert CBEU 1340 to the FM band, which received CRTC approval on November 4, 2014. Temagami's FM transmitter signed on at 106.1 MHz in late 2014 with its new callsign, CBCS-FM-1.

On February 26, 2016, the CBC submitted an application to convert CBEY 1340 to the FM band. Its proposed callsign will be CBEY-FM. On June 20, 2016, the CRTC approved the CBC's application to operate an FM rebroadcasting transmitter in Moosonee to replace its existing low-power AM transmitter CBEY. The new transmitter will operate at 99.9 MHz with an effective radiated power of 135 watts (non-directional antenna with an effective height of antenna above average terrain of 8.97 metres).

On March 9, 2016, the CBC received CRTC approval to change CBCG-FM's transmitter class from low power to regular power A1, increasing the effective radiated power from 8 to 115.7 watts and decreasing the effective height of antenna above average terrain from 71.5 to 54.3 metres.

On August 19, 2021, the CRTC approved the CBC's application to increase the average effective radiated power (ERP) for CBEC-FM at 90.3 MHz Elliot Lake from 103 to 1,065 watts (maximum ERP from 264 to 2,725 watts), increasing the effective height of the antenna above average terrain from 141.0 to 165.3 metres.

Transmitters CBLF 1450 Foleyet and CBLO 1240 Mattawa are the last two CBC low power AM transmitters to rebroadcast CBCS-FM Sudbury. No plans have been announced to either convert them to the FM band or shut them down completely.
