= Northern Ontario =

Primary Region in Ontario, Canada

Coordinates: 50°N 86°W

- Primary region
- ██ Statistical area (geographic area north of French River) ██ Extended administrative area
- Country: Canada
- Province: Ontario

Area
  - Total: 806,707.51 km^{2} (311,471.51 sq mi)

Population (2021)
  - Total: 789,519
  - Density: 0.98/km^{2} (2.5/sq mi)
- Largest city: Greater Sudbury; 166,044 (2021)
- Highest point: Ishpatina Ridge (693 m)
- Longest river: Albany River (980 km)
- Government of Ontario List of MPs: Charlie Angus; Patty Hajdu; Carol Hughes; Viviane Lapointe; Eric Melillo; Anthony Rota; Marcus Powlowski; Jim Belanger; Terry Sheehan; List of MPPs: Gilles Bisson; Guy Bourgouin; Vic Fedeli; France Gélinas; Michael Gravelle; Sol Mamakwa; Michael Mantha; Judith Monteith-Farrell; Greg Rickford; Ross Romano; John Vanthof; Jamie West

Northern Ontario is a primary geographic and quasi-administrative region of the Canadian province of Ontario, the other primary region being Southern Ontario. Most of the core geographic region is located on part of the Superior Geological Province of the Canadian Shield, a vast rocky plateau located mainly north of Lake Huron (including Georgian Bay), the French River, Lake Nipissing, and the Mattawa River. The statistical region extends south of the Mattawa River to include all of the District of Nipissing. The southern section of this district lies on part of the Grenville Geological Province of the Shield which occupies the transitional area between Northern and Southern Ontario.

The extended federal and provincial quasi-administrative regions of Northern Ontario have their own boundaries even further south in the transitional area that vary according to their respective government policies and requirements. Ontario government departments and agencies such as the Growth Plan for Northern Ontario and the Northern Ontario Heritage Fund Corporation define Northern Ontario as all areas north of, and including, the districts of Parry Sound and Nipissing for political purposes, and the federal but not the provincial government also includes the district of Muskoka.

The statistical region has a land area of 806,000 km^{2} (311,000 sq mi) and constitutes 88 percent of the land area of Ontario, but with just 780,000 people, it contains only about six percent of the province's population. The climate is characterized by extremes of temperature, with very cold winters and hot summers. The principal industries are mining, forestry, and hydroelectricity.

For some purposes, Northern Ontario is further subdivided into Northeastern and Northwestern Ontario. When the region is divided in that way, the three westernmost districts (Rainy River, Kenora and Thunder Bay) constitute Northwestern Ontario, and the other districts constitute Northeastern Ontario. Northeastern Ontario contains two thirds of Northern Ontario's population.

In the early 20th century, Northern Ontario was often called "New Ontario", although that name has fallen into disuse because of its colonial connotations. (In French, however, the region may still be referred to as Nouvel-Ontario, although le Nord de l'Ontario and Ontario-Nord are now more commonly used.)

== Territorial evolution ==
Those areas which formed part of New France in the Pays d'en Haut, essentially the watersheds of the Ottawa River, Lake Huron and Lake Superior, had been acquired by the British by the Treaty of Paris (1763) and became part of Upper Canada in 1791, and then the Province of Canada between 1840 and 1867.

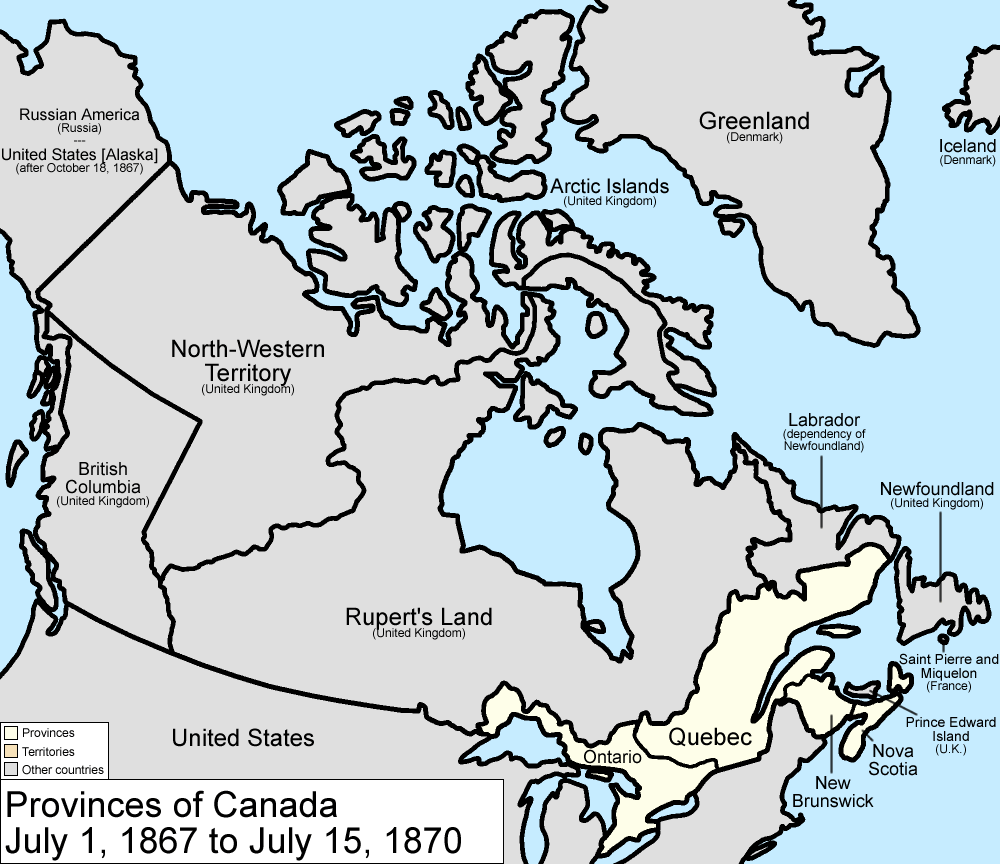
Canadian provincial boundaries in 1867

At the time of Canadian Confederation in 1867, the portion of Northern Ontario lying south of the Laurentian Divide was part of Ontario, whilst the portion north of the divide was part of the separate British territory of Rupert's Land. The province's boundaries were provisionally expanded northward and westward in 1874, whilst the Lake of the Woods region remained subject to a boundary dispute between Ontario and Manitoba. The region was confirmed as belonging to Ontario by decision of the Judicial Committee of the Privy Council in 1884, and confirmed by the Canada (Ontario Boundary) Act, 1889 of the Parliament of the United Kingdom, which set the province's new northern boundary at the Albany River.

The remaining northernmost portion of the province, from the Albany River to Hudson Bay, was transferred to the province from the Northwest Territories by the Parliament of Canada in the Ontario Boundaries Extension Act, 1912. This region was originally established as the District of Patricia, but was merged into the Kenora District in 1937.

== Judicial and administrative divisions ==
The Province of Canada began creating judicial districts in sparsely populated Northern Ontario with the establishment of Algoma District and Nipissing District in 1858. These districts had no municipal function; they were created for the provision of judicial and administrative services from the district seat. Nipissing had no district seat until 1895. Up until that date, registry office and higher court services were available at Pembroke in Renfrew County. Nipissing Stipendiary Magistrate and land registrar William Doran established his residence at North Bay in 1885. Following the hotly contested district town election in 1895, North Bay earned the right to become the district seat in the new Provisional District of Nipissing. After the creation of the province of Ontario in 1867, the first district to be established was Thunder Bay in 1871 which until then had formed part of Algoma District. The Ontario government was reluctant to establish new districts in the north, partly because the northern and western boundaries of Ontario were in dispute after Confederation. Ontario's right to Northwestern Ontario was determined by the Judicial Committee of the Privy Council in 1884 and confirmed by the Canada (Ontario Boundary) Act, 1889 of the Parliament of the United Kingdom. By 1899 there were seven northern districts: Algoma, Manitoulin, Muskoka, Nipissing, Parry Sound, Rainy River, and Thunder Bay. Five more northern districts were created between 1907 and 1922: Cochrane, Kenora, Sudbury, Temiskaming and Patricia. The Patricia District was then merged into the Kenora District in 1927.

Unlike the counties and regional municipalities of Southern Ontario, which have a government and administrative structure and jurisdiction over specified government services, a district lacks that level of administration. Districts are too sparsely populated to maintain a county government system, so many district-based services are provided directly by the provincial government. For example, districts have provincially maintained secondary highways instead of county roads.

Statistically, the districts in Northern Ontario (which appear in red on the location map) are Rainy River, Kenora, Thunder Bay, Cochrane, Timiskaming, Algoma, Sudbury, Nipissing and Manitoulin. The single-tier municipality of Greater Sudbury — which is not politically part of the District of Sudbury — is the only census division in Northern Ontario where county-level services are offered by a local government rather than the province.

A portion of the Nipissing District which lies south of the geographic dividing line between Northern and Southern Ontario is considered administratively and statistically part of Northern Ontario because of its status as part of Nipissing. As well, for administrative purposes, the districts of Muskoka and Parry Sound are sometimes treated as part of Northern Ontario even though they are geographically in Southern or Central Ontario. In 2004, finance minister Greg Sorbara removed Muskoka from the jurisdictional area of the Ministry of Northern Development and Mines and the Northern Ontario Heritage Fund, to which it had been added in 2000 by his predecessor Ernie Eves, but the province continues to treat Parry Sound as a Northern Ontario division under both programs. The federal government continues to retain both more southerly districts in the service area of FedNor.

All of Northeastern Ontario is within the Eastern (UTC −5) time zone; Northwestern Ontario is split between the Eastern and Central (UTC −6) time zones.

== Communities ==
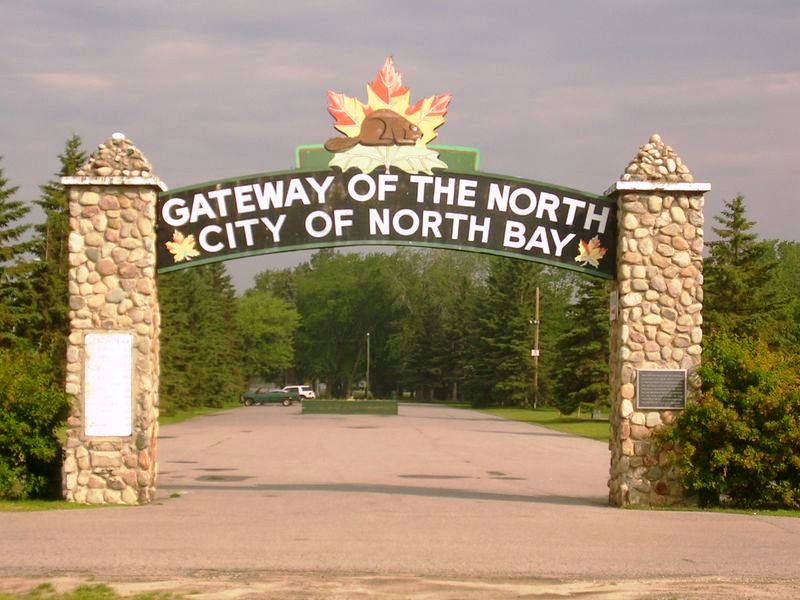
North Bay is often considered to be the "Gateway" to Northern Ontario

=== Cities ===
Northern Ontario has nine cities. In order of population as of the Canada 2021 Census, they are:

Name of city	Population	CMA/CA population	CMA/CA
Greater Sudbury	166,004	170,605	CMA
Thunder Bay	108,843	123,258	CMA
Sault Ste. Marie	72,051	76,731	CA
North Bay	52,662	71,736	CA
Timmins	41,145	41,145	CA
Kenora	14,967	14,967	CA
Elliot Lake	11,372	11,372	CA
Temiskaming Shores	9,634	N/A	
Dryden	7,388	N/A	

In the Province of Ontario there are no requirements to become a city and the designation is voluntary. As a result, there are four towns in Northern Ontario that have a larger population than its smallest city Dryden.

Until the City of Greater Sudbury was created in 2001, Thunder Bay had a larger population than the old city of Sudbury, but the Regional Municipality of Sudbury was the larger Census Metropolitan Area as Sudbury had a much more populous suburban belt (including the city of Valley East, formerly the region's sixth-largest city.) However, as the former Regional Municipality of Sudbury is now governed as a single city, it is both the region's largest city and the region's largest CMA.

=== Towns ===
Other municipalities in Northern Ontario include:

Name of Town	Population (2021)	Population (2016)	Population percentage change, 2016 to 2021
West Nipissing	14,583	14,364	1.5
Kapuskasing	8,057	8,292	-2.8
Kirkland Lake	7,750	7,981	-2.9
Fort Frances	7,466	7,739	-3.5
Parry Sound	6,879	6,408	7.4
Oliver Paipoonge	6,035	5,922	1.9
Cochrane	5,390	5,321	1.3
Sioux Lookout	5,839	5,272	10.8
Hearst	4,794	5,070	-5.4
Espanola	5,185	4,996	2.7
Greenstone	4,309	4,636	-7.1
Iroquois Falls	4,418	4,537	-2.6
Red Lake	4,094	4,107	-0.3

== Economy ==
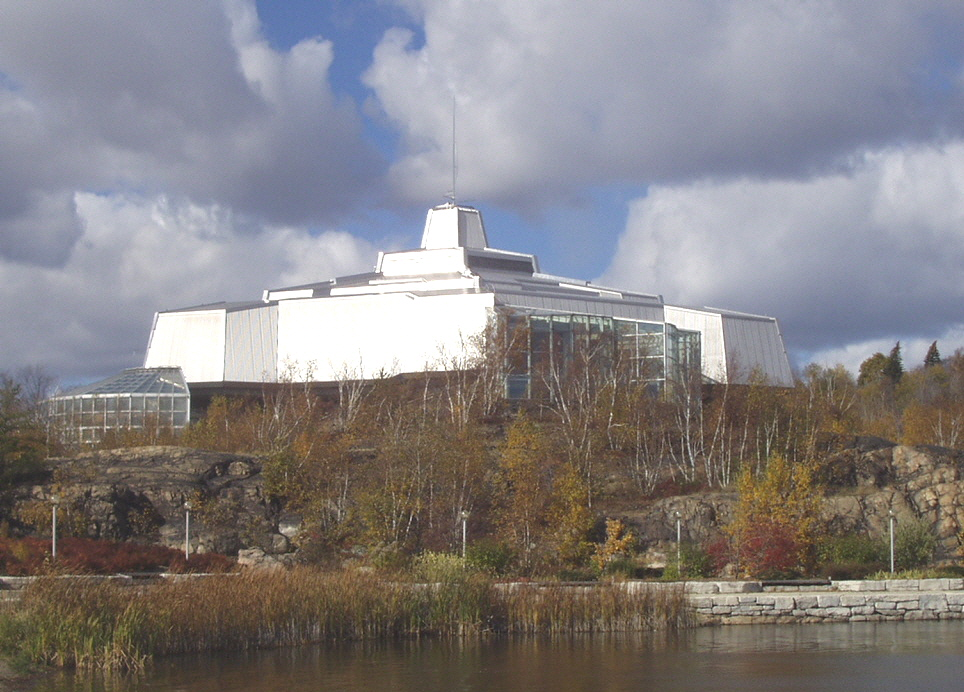
Science North in Sudbury.

Sudbury is the dominant city in Northeastern Ontario, and Thunder Bay is the dominant city in Northwestern Ontario. These two regions are quite distinct from each other economically and culturally, and although the two regions are adjacent, their population centres are quite distant from each other. As a result, Sudbury and Thunder Bay are each the primary city in their part of the region but neither city can be said to outrank the other as the principal economic centre of Northern Ontario as a whole.

In fact, each city has a couple of distinct advantages that the other city lacks — Sudbury is at the centre of a larger economic sphere due to the city's, and Northeastern Ontario's, larger population but Thunder Bay is advantaged by air, rail and shipping traffic due to its prime location along major continental transportation routes. The Thunder Bay International Airport is the third busiest airport in Ontario after Toronto Pearson International Airport and Ottawa Macdonald–Cartier International Airport, carrying some 600,000 passengers in 2004 with over 100 domestic flights and four international flights daily. Sudbury's economy, in which the largest sectors of employment are government-related fields such as education and health care, is somewhat more diversified than Thunder Bay's, which is still based primarily on natural resources and manufacturing. Yet, in the era of government cutbacks, Thunder Bay's economy has been less prone to recession and unemployment. Sudbury trades more readily into Southern Ontario, whereas Thunder Bay has closer trade ties to Manitoba and Minnesota.

Under the staples thesis of Canadian economic history, Northern Ontario is a "hinterland" or "periphery" region, whose economic development has been defined primarily by providing raw natural resource materials to larger and more powerful business interests from elsewhere in Canada or the world.

Northern Ontario has had difficulty in recent years maintaining both its economy and its population. All of the region's cities declined in population between the censuses of 1996 and 2001. (This coincides with the discontinuation of the operation of the subsidized government airline norOntair in March 1996.) Although the cities have tried with mixed results to diversify their economies in recent years, most communities in the region are resource-based economies, whose economic health is very dependent on "boom and bust" resource cycles. Mining and forestry are the two major industries in the region, although manufacturing, transportation, public services and tourism are represented as well. After 2001, the major cities returned to patterns of modest growth in the censuses of 2006, 2011, 2016 and 2021, although many of the smaller towns saw further declines.

The cities have, by and large, been very dependent on government-related employment and investment for their economic diversification. The Liberal government of David Peterson in the 1980s moved several provincial agencies and ministries to Northern Ontario, including the Ontario Lottery and Gaming Corporation (which maintains a large office in Sault Ste. Marie) and the Ministry of Northern Development and Mines (whose head office is in Greater Sudbury).

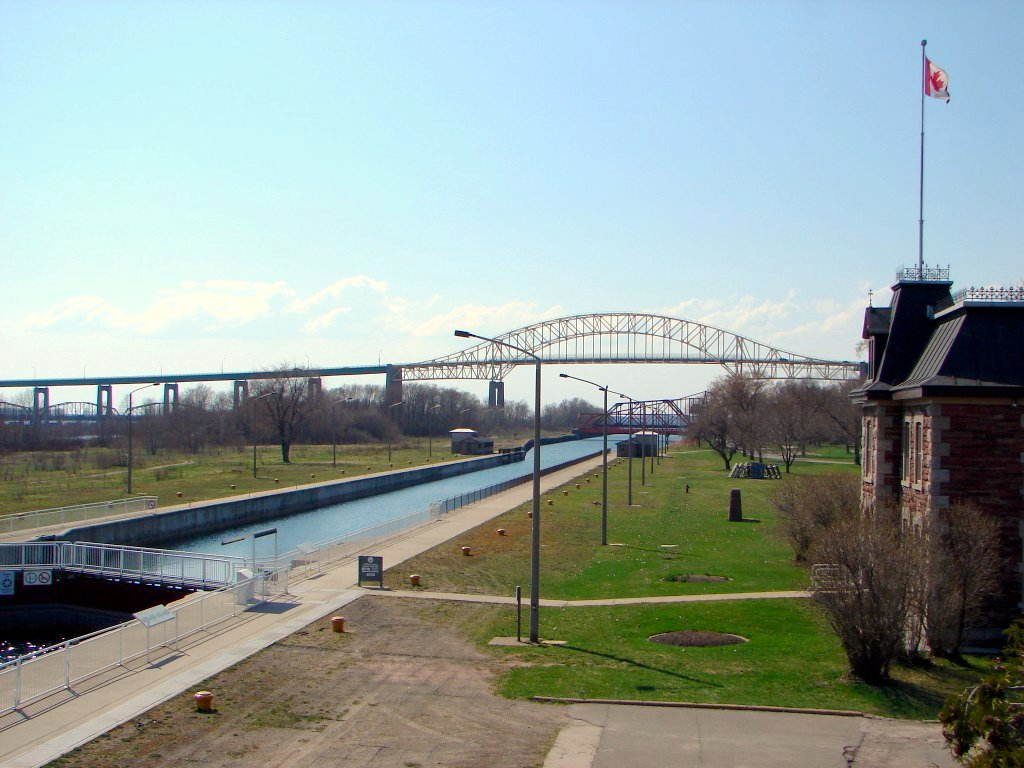
Sault Locks in Sault Ste. Marie.

As well, many of Northern Ontario's major tourist attractions (e.g. Science North, Dynamic Earth, the Sault Locks, etc.) are agencies of the provincial or federal governments. Further, much of the funding available for economic development in Northern Ontario comes from government initiatives such as the federal government's Federal Economic Development Initiative for Northern Ontario (FedNor) and the provincial Northern Ontario Heritage Fund.

Over the past several years, there has been a renewed interest in mining exploration. McFaulds Lake in the James Bay Lowlands has attracted the attention of junior mining exploration companies. Since the 2003 investigation of the area for diamonds, some 20 companies have staked claims in the area, forming joint ventures. While still in the exploration phase, there have been some exciting finds that could bring prosperity to the region and the First Nations communities in that area. New mining sites have also been investigated and explored in Sudbury, Timmins, Kirkland Lake, Elliot Lake and the Temagami area. In Chapleau, Probe Mines Limited is in the advanced stage of exploration and was recognized in 2013 with the Ontario Prospectors Association 2013 Ontario Prospector Award.

== Politics ==
Northern Ontario has generally been one of the weakest areas in all of Canada for both the federal Progressive Conservative and Conservative parties, as well as one of the weakest areas for the provincial Progressive Conservatives. Instead, the Liberal Party has traditionally taken the majority of the region's seats at both the federal and provincial levels. The New Democrats also have a significant base of support, thanks to Northern Ontario's history of labour unionism, support from First Nations communities, and the personal popularity of local NDP figures.

Two Premiers of Ontario, William Hearst (1914–1919) and Mike Harris (1995–2002), represented Northern Ontario constituencies in the Legislative Assembly of Ontario. However, Harris himself was the only Conservative candidate elected in a true Northern Ontario riding in either the 1995 or 1999 elections (if the definition of Northern Ontario includes the Parry Sound District, then Harris was joined by Ernie Eves in Parry Sound—Muskoka). Following Eves' retirement from politics, Norm Miller was also elected in Parry Sound—Muskoka in a by-election in 2001, and was re-elected in the 2003 and 2007 elections.

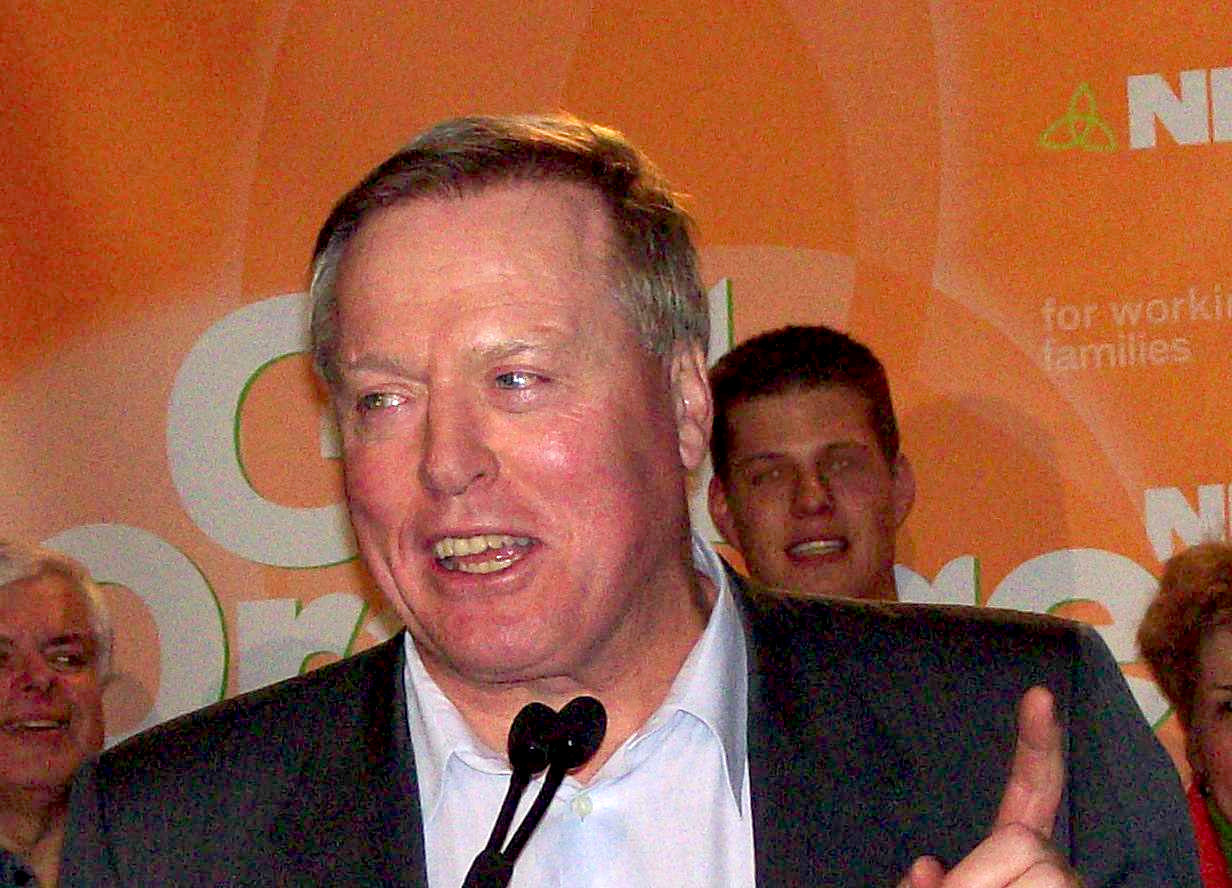
Former Ontario NDP leader Howard Hampton, MPP for Kenora—Rainy River

Former Ontario New Democratic Party leader Howard Hampton and former Ontario Liberal Party leader Lyn McLeod also represented Northern Ontario ridings in the provincial legislature; the six months in 1996 between Hampton's accession to the NDP leadership in June and McLeod's departure as Liberal leader in December marked the first and only time in Ontario's history that all three parties in the legislature were simultaneously led by Northern Ontario MPPs.

The riding of Algoma East was represented federally by Prime Minister Lester B. Pearson from 1948 to 1968. Pearson was not from the district, however, but represented the district because it had been chosen as a safe seat for him to run in a 1948 by-election following the appointment of Thomas Farquhar to the Senate of Canada.

In the 2008 federal election, the New Democratic Party won nearly every seat in the region, with the exception of Nipissing—Timiskaming, which was retained by its Liberal incumbent Anthony Rota, and Kenora, which was won by Conservative Greg Rickford. This sweep included several seats which were formerly seen as Liberal strongholds, including Sudbury, Algoma—Manitoulin—Kapuskasing, Thunder Bay—Rainy River and Thunder Bay—Superior North. In the 2011 election, the NDP retained nearly all of these seats with the exception of Sault Ste. Marie, where longtime incumbent MP Tony Martin was defeated despite that election's historic increase in NDP support nationwide; in the 2015 election, however, a resurgence of Liberal support under Justin Trudeau resulted in the Liberals regaining all of the region's seats except Timmins-James Bay and Algoma—Manitoulin—Kapuskasing, where the NDP incumbents were successfully re-elected.

Major political issues in recent years have included the economic health of the region, the extension of Highway 400 from Parry Sound to Sudbury, issues pertaining to the quality and availability of health care services, mining development in the Ring of Fire region around McFaulds Lake, the closure of Ontario Northland, the Algo Centre Mall roof collapse of 2012, and a controversial but now-defunct plan to ship Toronto's garbage to the Adams Mine, an abandoned open pit mine in Kirkland Lake.

In the redistribution of provincial electoral districts before the 2007 election, the province retained the existing electoral district boundaries in Northern Ontario, rather than adjusting them to correspond to federal electoral district boundaries as was done in the southern part of the province. Without this change, the region would have lost one Member of Provincial Parliament. For the 2018 election, the province further diverged from the federal electoral districts in the region, creating the special districts of Kiiwetinoong and Mushkegowuk—James Bay to accommodate the unique political concerns of the rural far north.

Due to the region's relatively sparse population, federal and provincial electoral districts in the region are almost all extremely large geographically. The federal electoral district of Sudbury and the provincial electoral districts of Sudbury and Sault Ste. Marie are the only ones that are comparable in size to an electoral district in Southern Ontario, while at the other extreme the districts of Kiiwetinoong and Mushkegowuk—James Bay are both geographically larger than the entire United Kingdom. One consequence of this, for example, is that a politician who represents a Northern Ontario riding in the House of Commons of Canada or the Legislative Assembly of Ontario must typically maintain a much higher budget for travel and office expenses than one who represents a small urban district does.

=== Secession movements ===
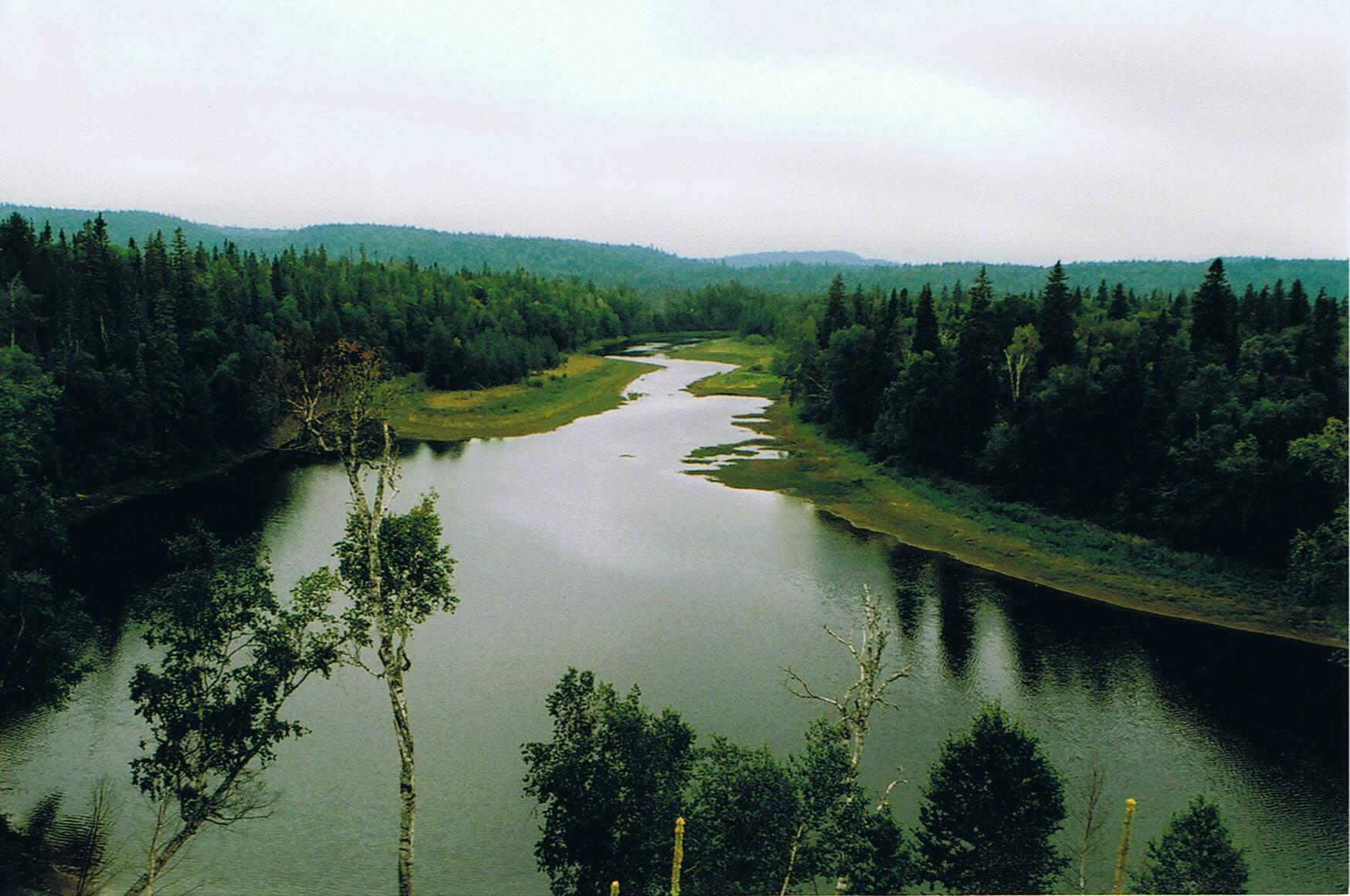
Forests, lakes, and rivers dominate much of the Northern Ontario landscape.

Ongoing high unemployment, lack of awareness of or concern for Northern Ontario's problems, and difficulties in achieving economic diversification have led to discontent amongst Northern Ontarians; throughout the region's history, there have been various movements proposing that the region secede from Ontario to form its own separate province or territory within Canada. The first to raise the issue of secession was Simon James Dawson in 1875, then the representative of the Algoma district in the Legislative Assembly of Ontario. Then, a movement emerged in Sudbury in the 1890s, when the provincial government began taxing mines; a second movement emerged following the creation of Alberta and Saskatchewan in 1905. In the 1940s, an organization called the New Province League formed to lobby for the creation of a new territory of "Aurora".

In 1966, a committee of mayors from the region, comprising Max Silverman of Sudbury, G. W. Maybury of Kapuskasing, Ernest Reid of Fort William, Leo Del Villano of Timmins, Merle Dickerson of North Bay and Leo Foucault of Espanola, formed to study the feasibility of Northern Ontario forming a new province.

In the late 1970s, North Bay businessman and city councillor Ed Deibel formed the Northern Ontario Heritage Party to lobby for the formation of a separate province of Northern Ontario. The party attracted only modest support and folded in 1984, but was reestablished in 2010. Both the party's original and revived forms have varied their platforms at different times, sometimes advocating for full independence of the region and other times lobbying for measures to increase the region's power over its own affairs within the province, including increasing the number of Northern Ontario electoral districts in the Legislative Assembly of Ontario and the creation of a special district for the region's First Nations voters.

In 1999 the Northeastern Ontario Municipal Association, a committee consisting of the mayors of 14 Northern Ontario municipalities, wrote a letter to Prime Minister Jean Chrétien asking him to outline the necessary conditions for the region to secede from Ontario to form a new province. This movement emerged as a reaction to the government of Mike Harris, whose policies were widely unpopular in the region even though Harris himself represented the Northern Ontario riding of Nipissing in the legislature.

More recently, some residents of the city of Kenora have called for the city or the wider region to secede from Ontario and join Manitoba. A few residents throughout the region continue to suggest splitting all or part of the region into a separate province. The latter movement, known as the Northern Ontario Secession Movement, has begun to attract attention and support; most notably by the mayors of Kenora and Fort Frances. The crisis in the Ontario forest industry, and the perceived inaction by the provincial government, has in particular spurred support for the idea of secession. In particular, many residents feel that the industrial energy rate is too high to allow the industry to remain competitive.

While also stopping short of advocating for full independence, Sudbury's Northern Life community newspaper published a number of editorials in the 2010s calling on the province to create a new level of supraregional government that would give the Northern Ontario region significantly more autonomy over its own affairs within the province. In the 2013 Ontario Liberal Party leadership race, candidate Glen Murray similarly proposed a distinct level of supraregional government for Northern Ontario.

== Education ==
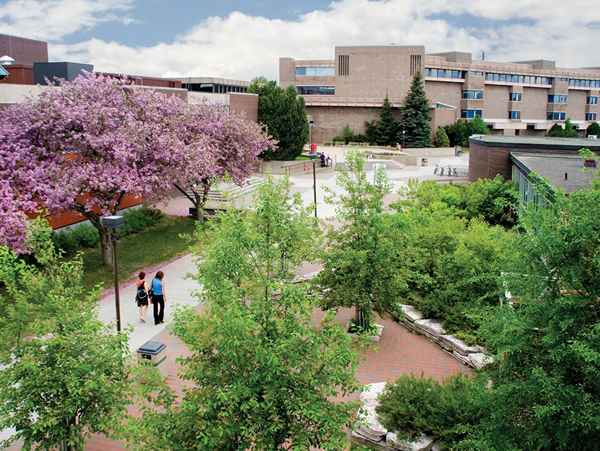
Lakehead University in Thunder Bay.

The region is home to five universities: Lakehead University in Thunder Bay, Laurentian University in Sudbury, Nipissing University in North Bay, Algoma University in Sault Ste. Marie, and the Université de Hearst in Hearst, Kapuskasing and Timmins. All except Lakehead began as federated schools of Laurentian University, before being rechartered as independent universities at different times.

The region also has six colleges: Confederation College in Thunder Bay, Sault College in Sault Ste. Marie, Northern College in Timmins, Canadore College in North Bay, and the anglophone Cambrian College and francophone Collège Boréal in Sudbury. Several of the colleges also have satellite campuses in smaller Northern Ontario communities.

A large distance education network, Contact North, also operates from Sudbury and Thunder Bay to provide educational services to small and remote Northern Ontario communities.

The Northern Ontario School of Medicine opened in 2005. Initially a joint faculty of Laurentian and Lakehead universities, it became a standalone university in 2022 dually based in Sudbury and Thunder Bay. NOSM has clinical placements throughout Northern Ontario and a special research focus on rural medicine. In 2011, Laurentian University was granted a charter to launch the McEwen School of Architecture in Sudbury, and Lakehead University was granted approval to launch the Bora Laskin Faculty of Law in Thunder Bay. As with the Northern Ontario School of Medicine, each was the first school of its type ever established in the region, as well as the first new school of its type launched in Ontario since the 1960s.

== Culture ==
Outdoor recreation is popular in the region year-round. In summer, fishing, boating, canoeing, ATVing, and camping are enjoyed by residents. Hunting remains popular in autumn, especially for moose, whitetail deer, and grouse, although goose hunting is exceptionally popular near James Bay. Group hunting for moose is a favourite social outing. In winter, snowmobiling, ice fishing, outdoor shinny, cross-country skiing, and snowshoeing are popular activities. The region boasts extensive snowmobiling trails and many lakes are dotted with ice hut villages throughout the winter.

The region is home to numerous major cultural events, including Sudbury's La Nuit sur l'étang, Northern Lights Festival Boréal and Cinéfest, the Festival of the Sound in Parry Sound and the Red Rock Folk Festival in Red Rock. Many communities host festivals celebrating local ethnic groups such as French, Métis, First Nations, Finnish, and Italian. Other communities have celebrations of unique local heritage such as Kapuskasing's Lumberjack Days, Mattawa's Voyageur Days, Sioux Lookout's Blueberry Festival, Elliot Lake's Uranium Heritage Days, and Red Lake's Norseman Festival. Even the smallest First Nations in the region will have an annual pow wow, which bring in many people from outside the community as well, although by far the largest and most famous powwow in the region is held in Wiikwemkoong on Manitoulin Island. In winter, many towns will host a winter carnival celebrating the cold weather; the largest of these is Sault Ste. Marie's Bon Soo Winter Carnival.

As of 2017, LGBT pride events take place in Sudbury (Sudbury Pride), Thunder Bay (Thunder Pride), Sault Ste. Marie, North Bay, Timmins, Elliot Lake and Kenora.

There is no single regional culinary dish. Fish and wild game, such as walleye (pickerel) and moose, can be considered regional favourites. Roadside chip trucks are popular choices for meals for locals and tourists alike, and almost every community has at least one. Poutine, which originated in Quebec with early adoption in Northern Ontario, is a core dish at these and many other restaurants.

Italian cuisine has had an influence on the culture of Northeastern Ontario, with porchetta considered a culinary signature of Sudbury and Sault Ste. Marie, while Thunder Bay's food culture is distinctively Finnish, with the Hoito restaurant known internationally for its Finnish-style pancakes and other traditional Finnish dishes.

Chinese Canadian restaurants have been common in every city and many smaller settlements in Northern Ontario since the early 20th century, satisfying "the ubiquitous Northern demand for Chinese food," albeit often heavily Westernized.

Although maple syrup is not produced in most of Northern Ontario, it is still made in some areas near North Bay, Sudbury, Manitoulin Island, and Sault Ste. Marie. St. Joseph Island near Sault Ste. Marie is noted for the large quantity of maple syrup produced there.

Since the demise of Northern Breweries, formerly the region's primary local brewery, in 2006, several new local craft brewers have emerged in the region, including Stack Brewing in Sudbury, OutSpoken Brewing and Northern Superior Brewing in Sault Ste. Marie, Sleeping Giant Brewing and Dawson Trail Craft Brewery in Thunder Bay, Lake of the Woods Brewing in Kenora, Manitoulin Brewing in Little Current, New Ontario Brewing Company in North Bay, and Full Beard Brewing in Timmins.

== Sports ==
Although many sports are played in the region, ice hockey and curling are the most popular. Almost every community is home to both a hockey and curling rink. In fact, Northern Ontario is the only provincial or territorial subregion in Canada that sends its own teams to the Brier and the Tournament of Hearts separately from its province. Hockey is often played on artificial outdoor rinks, and sometimes on frozen lakes.

The North Bay Battalion, Sault Ste. Marie Greyhounds, and Sudbury Wolves play in the Ontario Hockey League at the Major Junior level. The Northern Ontario Junior Hockey League and Superior International Junior Hockey League operate at the Junior A level and the Lakehead Junior Hockey League at Junior B.

The Algoma Thunderbirds, Lakehead Thunderwolves, Laurentian Voyageurs, and Nipissing Lakers compete in U Sports as members of Ontario University Athletics.

Also, the Thunder Bay Chill soccer teams play in the Prairies Premier League, formally played in USL League Two until 2026.

Northern Ontario has hosted the 1981 Canada Summer Games, 1988 World Junior Championships in Athletics, FIS Nordic World Ski Championships 1995 and 2003 Continental Cup of Curling.

In 2018, the Sudbury Five were launched in the National Basketball League of Canada, later joining the Basketball Super League.

== Media ==
As of 2017, only the CTV and Global networks have comprehensive terrestrial coverage in Northern Ontario, while services such as CBC Television, City, CTV Two, TVOntario, TFO and Ici Radio-Canada Télé are available almost exclusively via cable carriage of stations from Toronto. In the northeast, the four CTV Northern Ontario stations are the only television stations with locally based studios, while the region receives Global and CHCH-TV via rebroadcast transmitters; in Thunder Bay, where Dougall Media's two television stations are the only locally owned twinstick operation remaining in English Canada, one station operates as a Global affiliate while the other switched its affiliation from CBC to CTV on September 1, 2014.

Daily newspapers in the region include the Sudbury Star, the Chronicle-Journal in Thunder Bay, the Sault Star in Sault Ste. Marie, the North Bay Nugget, the Timmins Daily Press and the Kenora Daily Miner and News. The Chronicle-Journal is owned by Continental Newspapers, and all of the other daily newspapers are owned by Postmedia. Community newspapers include Northern Life in Sudbury, Northern News in Kirkland Lake, Thunder Bay's Source, the Dryden Observer, Sault This Week, the Mid-North Monitor in Espanola, the Manitoulin Expositor on Manitoulin Island and the Village Media network of web hyperlocals.

Noted magazines published in the region include HighGrader, Northern Ontario Business and Sudbury Living.

Most commercial radio stations in Northern Ontario are owned by the national radio groups Rogers Communications, Vista Broadcast Group, Bell Media or Stingray Group, although a few independent and community broadcasters are represented as well. CBC Radio One has stations in Sudbury (CBCS), with rebroadcasters throughout Northeastern Ontario, and in Thunder Bay (CBQT), with rebroadcasters in the Northwest. The French Ici Radio-Canada Première has a station in Sudbury (CBON), with rebroadcasters throughout Northern Ontario. CBC Music is currently heard only in Sudbury (CBBS) and Thunder Bay (CBQ), and the French Ici Musique is currently heard only in Sudbury (CBBX).

Cable television service is provided by Shaw Cable in Sault Ste. Marie and virtually all of Northwestern Ontario, by Cogeco in North Bay, and by EastLink in Northeastern Ontario apart from North Bay and Sault Ste. Marie.

In December 1951, CFCL went to air, broadcasting from Timmins. The first French-language radio station in Ontario, reached listeners from Kirkland Lake to Hearst, showcasing local talent and creating a sense of community among the widely dispersed francophone population of Northern Ontario. Until then greeted with enthusiasm by Franco-Ontarians who until then had heard limited programming in French over the airwaves.

== Demographics ==
The mining boom of the early twentieth century attracted many francophones to Northeastern Ontario, and French is still widely spoken there. While the Canadian constitution never required the province of Ontario to recognize French as an official language, the government provides full services in the French language to any citizen, resident, or visitor wishing it including communications, schools, hospitals, social services, and in the courts, under the French Language Services Act of 1986. Bilingualism is higher than the Canadian average – in 2011, 180,020 people, or 24.6% of the population, spoke both English and French. There were also 8,910 people, or 1.2% of the population, who only spoke French. All of Northeastern Ontario, with the technical exception of Manitoulin Island, is designated as a French language service area, as are a few individual municipalities in the Northwest; Manitoulin Island, while not officially designated as a French language service area, effectively functions as one anyway since it receives most provincial government services from the designated Sudbury District seat in Espanola rather than functioning as its own jurisdictional area.

The government of Canada provides French and English equally in all matters. In 2011, 10.2% of people in Northern Ontario spoke French most often at home, mostly in Northeastern Ontario.

The 2016 Canadian Census found that the population of Northern Ontario was 780,140. During the Canada 2011 Census, data was not included from 17 incompletely enumerated Indian Reserves across the region. Four reserves were not counted due to permission not being given, and another 13 in Northwestern Ontario were not counted due to evacuations caused by forest fires. The census was later adjusted with the figures for these reserves showing a total population of 11,435. The median age for Northern Ontario in 2011 was 43.9. There were 43,670 immigrants in 2011, representing 5.8% of the population, down from 6.8% in 2006.

The region also has a significant First Nations population, primarily of the Ojibwe, Cree and Oji-Cree nations, with smaller communities of Nipissing, Algonquin, Odawa and Saulteaux.

In 2016, Northwestern Ontario was 71% white, 26.2% indigenous and 2.8% visible minorities. The largest visible minority groups in the region were South Asian (0.5%), Black (0.4%), Chinese (0.4%), Filipino (0.4%) and Southeast Asian (0.3%) Northeastern Ontario was 82.5% white, 15% indigenous and 2.5% visible minorities. The largest visible minority groups were South Asian (0.6%), Black (0.6%) and Chinese (0.4%).

A 2001 census showed Catholicism as the most commonly practiced religion in Northern Ontario (50.8%). The Precious Blood Cathedral in Sault Ste. Marie is the official cathedral for the diocese. However, the Pro-Cathedral of the Assumption in North Bay acts as the unofficial Episcopal See for the Diocese of Sault Sainte Marie.

The languages that had at least 1,000 native speakers (single mother-tongue response) in Northern Ontario in 2006 were:

		2011	%	2006	%
1.	English	533,980	73.94%	525,230	70.98%
2.	French	125,675	17.40%	131,450	17.76%
3.	Italian	11,245	1.56%	14,560	1.97%
4.	Ojibwe	10,570	1.46%	10,655	1.44%
5.	Oji-Cree	6,325	0.88%	6,120	0.83%
6.	Finnish	5,615	0.78%	7,130	0.96%
7.	German	5,125	0.71%	6,275	0.85%
8.	Cree	3,485	0.48%	3,150	0.43%
9.	Polish	2,700	0.37%	3,655	0.49%
10.	Ukrainian	2,475	0.34%	3,950	0.53%
11.	Chinese	1,620	0.22%	1,945	0.26%
12.	Dutch	1,400	0.19%	1,790	0.24%
13.	Spanish	1,140	0.16%	1,035	0.14%
14.	Portuguese	1,100	0.15%	1,395	0.19%
15.	Croatian	945	0.13%	1,160	0.16%

Ethnic Origin (2016)	Population	Percent
Canadian	287,835	36.9%
French	204,775	26.2%
English	185,075	23.7%
Irish	142,055	18.2%
Scottish	138,470	17.7%
First Nations	104,945	13.5%
German	74,195	9.5%
Italian	62,405	8.0%
Ukrainian	42,795	5.5%
Métis	37,290	4.8%
Finnish	33,490	4.3%
Polish	28,160	3.6%
Dutch (Netherlands)	23,340	3.0%
Swedish	15,905	2.0%
British Isles, n.i.e.	13,340	1.7%
Welsh	11,145	1.4%
Norwegian	10,075	1.3%

Religion in Northern Ontario at the 2001 census

Religion	People	%
Total	729,210	100
Catholic	370,305	50.8
Protestant	241,145	33.2
No Religion	95,610	13.2
Other Christians	11,825	1.6
Other Religions*	3,540	0.5
Christian Orthodox	3,425	0.5
Muslim	990	0.1
Buddhist	820	0.1
Hindu	535	0.1
Jewish	505	0.1
Eastern Religions	455	0.1
Sikh	65	0.0

Note: Other religions mostly native spirituality

Out-migration from Northern Ontario especially of young and working-age adults, either to Southern Ontario or interprovincially especially to Western Canada, has been a prominent public issue since the 1990s.

== Fiction set in Northern Ontario ==
=== Novels ===
- Shut Up and Eat Your Snowshoes (1970), by Jack Douglas
- Surfacing (1972), by Margaret Atwood
- Bear (1976), by Marian Engel
- La Vengeance de l'orignal (1980), by Doric Germain
- Le Trappeur du Kabi (1981), by Doric Germain
- Loon (1992) and Freddy Dimwhistle's Northcountry Sketchbook (1997), by A. W. (Bill) Plumstead
- Logan in Overtime (1990), by Paul Quarrington
- Bastion Falls (1995), by Susie Moloney
- No Great Mischief (1999), by Alistair MacLeod
- Forty Words for Sorrow, The Delicate Storm, Blackfly Season, and By the Time You Read This (2000–2006), by Giles Blunt
- Crow Lake (2002) and The Other Side of the Bridge (2006), by Mary Lawson
- The Neanderthal Parallax (2002–2003), trilogy by Robert J. Sawyer
- Three Day Road (2005), by Joseph Boyden
- Someone Comes to Town, Someone Leaves Town (2005), by Cory Doctorow
- Voyageurs (2003), by Margaret Elphinstone
- Indian Horse (2012), by Richard Wagamese
- The City Still Breathing (2013), by Matthew Heiti
- We're All in This Together (2017), by Amy Jones
- Moon of the Crusted Snow (2018), by Waubgeshig Rice

=== Plays ===
- 1932, la ville du nickel by Jean-Marc Dalpé and Brigitte Haentjens (1984)
- Le Chien by Jean-Marc Dalpé (1987)
- The Rez Sisters by Tomson Highway (1988)
- Dry Lips Oughta Move to Kapuskasing by Tomson Highway (1989)
- Wildcat by Charlie Angus and Brit Griffin (1998)
- The (Post) Mistress by Tomson Highway (2009)

=== Films ===
- Captains of the Clouds - 1942
- Between Friends - 1973
- Roadkill - 1989
- Termini Station - 1989
- Highway 61 - 1991
- Dance Me Outside - 1994
- Mum's the Word (Maman et Ève) - 1996
- Men with Brooms - 2002
- Looking for Angelina - 2002
- Phil the Alien - 2003
- Shania: A Life in Eight Albums - 2005
- That Beautiful Somewhere - 2006
- Snow Cake - 2006
- Sleeping Giant - 2015
- Indian Horse - 2017
- Castle in the Ground - 2019

North Bay inventor Troy Hurtubise was the subject of the documentary film Project Grizzly (1996).

=== Television series ===
- The Forest Rangers (1963–1965, CBC)
- Adventures in Rainbow Country (filmed 1969, first aired 1970–1971, CBC)
- Spirit Bay (1984–1987, CBC)
- The Rez (1995–1998, CBC)
- Wind at My Back (1996–2001, CBC)
- Total Drama Island (2007–2008, Teletoon)
- Météo+ (2008–2011, TFO)
- Les Bleus de Ramville (2012–2014, TFO)
- Hard Rock Medical (2013–2018, TVOntario)
- St. Nickel (2016, Unis)
- Cardinal (2017–2020, CTV)
- What Would Sal Do? (2017, HBO Canada)
- Shoresy (2022–, Crave)

Television series The Red Green Show (1991–2005) and its spinoff theatrical film Duct Tape Forever (2002) are set in the fictional town of Possum Lake. The animated sitcom Chilly Beach (2003–2008, CBC), set in a fictional town of unspecified location in Northern Canada, was produced in Sudbury.

=== Comics ===
In the comic strip For Better or For Worse, Elizabeth Patterson attended North Bay's Nipissing University, and subsequently taught school in the fictional reserve of Mtigwaki on Lake Nipigon. Lynn Johnston, the strip's cartoonist, lives in Corbeil, near North Bay in real life, although the strip is set primarily in Southern Ontario.
