= The Fat and the Furriest =

- The Simpsons episode
- Episode no.: Season 15; Episode 5
- Directed by: Matthew Nastuk
- Written by: Joel H. Cohen
- Production code: EABF19
- Original air date: November 30, 2003

Guest appearance
- Charles Napier as Grant Conor

Episode features
- Couch gag: In a parody of the opening of the 1960s sitcom, Get Smart, Homer follows a red line down stairs, out of an elevator, through double-doors that open automatically, in an elevator and into an ascending door to the telephone box. He falls onto the couch with the family already there.
- Commentary: Al Jean; Joel H. Cohen; Matt Selman; Tim Long; Tom Gammill; Mike B. Anderson; Valentina L. Garza

Episode chronology
← Previous "The Regina Monologues"	Next → "Today I Am a Clown"
- The Simpsons season 15

"The Fat and the Furriest" is the fifth episode of the fifteenth season of the American animated television series The Simpsons. It originally aired on the Fox network in the United States on November 30, 2003. The episode was written by Joel H. Cohen and directed by Matthew Nastuk.

In this episode, Homer is humiliated after he is attacked by a bear, so he tries to regain his dignity. Charles Napier guest starred as Grant Conor. The episode received mixed reviews.

== Plot ==
Homer goes to Sprawl-Mart, and he buys Marge a "Kitchen Carnival" for Mother's Day, a machine that houses a cotton candy maker, a vat of liquid caramel, and a deep fryer. Eventually Homer uses it to make a giant ball of deep-fried, caramel-covered, cotton candy. When it becomes too dirty and inedible, Marge orders him to take it to the dump. While there, he is confronted by a large grizzly bear, from whom he cowers. The bear eventually wanders off without attacking, annoyed by Homer's tearful cowering. The incident becomes well known due to a nearby hunter with a camera.

Homer becomes a nervous wreck, hallucinating bears like Winnie-the-Pooh, Paddington Bear, Gummy Bears, Smokey Bear, the Snuggle Bear, Teddy Grahams, the Chicago Bears, and an "Intensive Care Bear." To add insult to injury, the hunter's tape is shown on the news, and Homer is mocked by many. Homer hires the hunter, named Grant Connor, to assist him in confronting the animal. Homer makes a near-useless suit of armor: despite Marge's objections and Lisa begging to him to not take revenge on the bear, Bart, Lenny and Carl join him as they start on their quest.

The four of them make camp in the woods. As his homemade armor is hot, Homer eventually takes it off and bathes in a stream, where he is again attacked by the bear. With Bart, Lenny and Carl dancing to the radio and paying no attention, the bear drags Homer to his cave. Deciding to die facing the bear as a man, Homer later discovers that the bear is only angry and hostile because of the painful electrical prod that Grant attached to the bear's ear. To make sure of it, Homer takes the tag off the bear and tries it on himself, resulting in a lot of pain before taking it off. Because of being freed from the electrical prod, the bear reverts to his friendly state, licking Homer and giving him a bear hug as a thanks.

Realizing this, Homer becomes friends with the bear. In the meantime, Marge and Lisa have discovered Homer, Bart, and the suit of armor missing, and Marge hires Grant to help track Homer down, though Lisa disapproves of Grant's methods to take down the bear. Homer decides to take the bear to a nearby wildlife refuge, but on the way, they are attacked by Grant and other hunters. To ensure the bear's survival, Homer dresses the bear up in the homemade armor, which surprisingly resists the gunfire and allows the bear to reach the wildlife refuge where he is promptly attacked by Stampy the elephant, but then fights back against him for good. It is then the whole family declares to be proud of Homer for his efforts of saving the bear from the hunters, to which he responds that he loves nature.

== Cultural references ==
The creation of bear-proof armor after surviving a bear attack (but not Homer's public cowardice) was inspired by Troy Hurtubise, whose story was told in the documentary Project Grizzly. Sprawl-Mart is a parody of Wal-Mart. The Bible cartoon shown at Sprawl-Mart is a parody of the Christian animated series VeggieTales.

== Reception ==
=== Viewing figures ===
The episode was watched by 11.7 million viewers, which was the 25th most watched show that week.

=== Critical response ===
Colin Jacobson of DVD Movie Guide called the episode a "pretty dopey concept" because it did not make sense.

On Four Finger Discount, Brendan Dando and Guy Davis thought the episode was "uneventful, but it's still entertaining." They thought the sympathy for Homer was earned.

Tyler Clark of Consequence called the episode the best one of the season. He said the episode was "simple, stupid, and satisfying" and showed what the show can be with a good writer.

=== Themes and analysis ===
Massih Zekavat and Tabea Scheel wrote how the episode demonstrates how people try to dominate nature by destroying it. They cite the examples of the electronic tracking device causing the bear's aggression and the bear fighting the elephant after it is sent to the sanctuary.

=== Awards and nominations ===
At the 14th Environmental Media Awards, this episode won the award for Television Episodic Comedy.
