= KWG Resources =

Junior mining company in Toronto, Ontario, Canada

KWG Resources Inc
- Industry: Mining
- Founded: 1937
- Headquarters: Toronto, Ontario, Canada
- Key people: Frank Smeenk CEO Director; Moe Lavigne
- Subsidiaries: Canada Chrome Corporation
- Website: kwgresources.com

KWG Resources Inc. is a Toronto, Ontario-based publicly traded junior Canadian mining company, most recently notable for its association with the development of chromite deposits in the mineral rich but largely inaccessible Ring of Fire in the James Bay lowlands of Northern Ontario. By 2013, KWG's wholly owned subsidiary, Canada Chrome Corporation, had "staked" a 330 km (210 mi)-long "string of mining claims" in anticipation of the construction of a transportation corridor that they hoped would link the stranded assets of the remote Big Daddy chromite deposit to CN Rail (CN) near Nakina, Ontario.

== History ==
KWG Resources was incorporated in 1937. Its principal business activities, based in Canada, are the exploration and evaluation of base metals and precious metals.

=== The Ring of Fire ===
Through its wholly owned subsidiary, Canada Chrome Corp., KWG Resources has interests in the development of claims to various chromite deposits in an area of northwest Ontario known as the Northern Ontario Ring of Fire. By April 2017, in a joint venture with mining developer Noront Resources in the Big Daddy chromite deposit, which is about 280 km (170 mi) north of Nakina, Ontario, KWG held a 30 per cent share. Noront had three high-grade chromite deposits, as well as nickel and base metal deposits in the region by 2019. In an agreement with Bold Ventures, KWG held a 50 per cent share in the Black Horse chromite deposit. Other Ring of Fire mining companies along with KWG, Noront, and Bold Ventures, include Fancamp Exploration and Probe Metals.

The Ring of Fire region is rich in minerals, though largely inaccessible.

=== Transportation corridor ===
KWG Resources is also interested in the development of transportation links to the remote Ring of Fire where KWG Resources has mineral interests.

By April 2013, KWG's 100 percent owned subsidiary, Canada Chrome Corporation, had "staked" a 330 km (210 mi)-long "string of mining claims" which would eventually provide a transportation corridor from the Big Daddy chromite deposit to CN Rail (CN) near Nakina. (Note: In 2013, Cliffs Natural Resources held the majority share of Big Daddy and KWG held 30 percent.) Big Daddy chromite deposit to CN Rail (CN) near Nakina. According to KWG, their subsidiary, Canada Chrome Corporation "conducted a $15 million surveying and soil testing program for the engineering and construction of a railroad to the Ring of Fire from Exton, Ontario." Moe Lavigne, KWG's vice-president of exploration and development, said that they had staked mining claims to eventually build the railroad and make their stranded assets "viable." Lavigne said that "Ontario's Mining Act would safeguard his company's corridor claims."

In February 2013, KWG released the Tetra Tech report that it had commissioned, in which the engineering firm concluded that a railroad would provide better access to ore in the Ring of Fire, than a road. In an April 2013 interview, Moe Lavigne, VP of KWG Resources, a former Ontario Geological Survey geologist, said that the federal government would consider Tetra Tech's findings. In 2013, Cliffs Natural Resources, the Ohio-based firmed that held the major share in Big Daddy, was seeking an easement through Ontario's Mining and Landings Commissioner on the KWG corridor to build their access road. In November 2013, The Globe and Mail, reported on the controversy over whether the province of Ontario, could afford a CAD$2.25 billion road the Trans-Canada Highway near Kenora to the Ring of Fire.

In 2017, the then-Ontario Premier, Kathleen Wynne, pledged support for the construction of a year-round access road from Nibinamik and Webequie First Nations, to Ontario Highway 599 at Pickle Lake, which would "also facilitate access to the Ring of Fire, located about 575 km (357 mi) north of Thunder Bay.

In the spring of 2016, engineers from the Xi'an, China-based China Railway Group Limited (FSDI)—which is owned by the Government of China through the China Railway Engineering Corporation—and KWG's Moe Lavigne visited the Ring of Fire in Northern Ontario to explore a potential north-south route for a chromite ore-haul railroad from the Ring of Fire. KWG's Chinese partners feasibility study had concluded that the route that traverses the traditional territory of the Marten Falls First Nation (MFFN) to reach Nakina in northwestern Ontario, was a "viable alignment". China consumes approximately 60% of the world's ferrochrome production.

According to an April 2017 Northern Ontario Business article, KWG said it was "working towards" creating an "equal partnership" to develop the chromite deposit with one of the First Nation's communities, Marten Falls First Nation, whose traditional territory includes the Ring of Fire nickel and chromite deposits and would also be traversed by the proposed north-south railway. The five Ring of Fire mining companies began planning on extending partnership offers to other nearby communities such as Aroland First Nation and Webequie First Nation, the Northern Ontario Business said. Aroland First Nation signed a memorandum of understanding (MOU) with Norand on June 6, 2019, regarding the development of Norand's Eagle's Nest nickel and base metal deposit.

In April 2017, KWG also requested a guarantee of a billion dollars from Ontario's Ring of Fire Infrastructure Development Corporation (ROFIDC) to use as "consideration for project financing terms from Chinese lenders."

In May 2017, representatives from KWG and the Marten Falls First Nation (MFFN), made an official visit to FSDI headquarters in Xi'an, China The FSDI feasibility study estimated that the capital cost of building the Far North railroad would be about $2 billion, says a June 2017 Northern Ontario Business article. The same article said that the proposed railroad would transport 10 million tonnes of chromite annually by 2030, potentially growing to a yearly volume of up to 24 million tonnes by 2040.

To complete the project, KWG is seeking financing from both China and the Government of Ontario, including supply agreements with the Chinese stainless steel industry.

KWG CEO Smeenk proposed the creation of the James Bay & Lowlands Transportation Authority, which would be "similar to an airport or port authority". He said that the federal government should participate in the Ring of Fire development by creating James Bay & Lowlands Transportation Authority—"similar to a port of airport— for the purpose of transporting ore from the Ring of Fire to Sault Ste. Marie where there is already a port and a rail line. The railway runs from Sault Ste. Marie to Hearst which is "half way to the Ring of Fire". Smeenk told Postmedia that in the current "political realities" and "regulatory environments", in order to extract minerals from the Ring of Fire and to avoid "political whims" from preventing the extraction of the minerals in the future, it was necessary to do "business with the United States."

In KWG hosted a fundraising event on April 5, 2018, Toronto's original stock exchange Bay Street in support of the establishment of the Transportation Authority to facilitate the transport of chromite ore "from the Ring of Fire to a proposed KWG processing plant in Sault Ste. Marie."

Invited guests included Premier Doug Ford, Maxime Bernier, and Chief Jason Gauthier, of the Missinabie Cree First Nation. KWG CEO Smeenk said that the transportation corridor would "ensure the viability" of the Algoma Central Railway, which is one of the goals of the Missanabie First Nation. The invitation for the April 5 event announced a discussion on the merits of "making ferrochrome in Sault Ste. Marie, Michigan for a new North American stainless steel joint-venture with Sault Ste. Marie, Ontario." Sault Ste. Marie's Mayor Christian Provenzano said in a March 22 news report, expressed concern that he was not aware of this joint venture, nor were their "partners in Sault Ste. Marie, Michigan." The news report said that "KWG is believed to be interested in partnering with the United States to take advantage of President Donald Trump's 'America First' approach to international trade."

== Management ==
The CEO and President of KWG Resources is Frank Smeenk, who is also the head of the "True North Strong and Free Advertising Corporation." The "True North Strong and Free Advertising Corporation" (TNSFAC) registered as a "third party" with Elections Canada on August 16, 2019. Journalistic reports by The Toronto Star and the CBC uncovered Mr. Smeenk as the person behind a number of billboard signs supporting Maxime Bernier and the People's Party of Canada in the 2019 Canadian federal election. According to The Toronto Star, Mr. Smeenk "declined to comment on the billboard beyond what appeared in the Elections Canada filing," thus confirming his participation in TNSFAC.

Data submitted to Elections Canada demonstrate that Mr. Smeenk's TNSFA corporation received only one donation, of $60,000, by Bassett & Walker International Inc. (BWI), the latter being directed by CEO Nicholas Walker. Most of BWI's money (i.e. $59,890.00) was used to pay for the above-mentioned billboard signs on August 16, 2019. Bassett & Walker International Inc. is a company based in Toronto, Ontario, which focuses on "the procurement of agricultural commodities" and "specializes in the international trade of a variety of proteins for the use in the food processing industries." BWI claims to "believe that equitable market practices and corporate social responsibility are essential to long-term business success."

The message depicted on the billboards ("say NO to mass immigration"), and which appeared in Vancouver, Halifax, Toronto, and Regina, received "overwhelming" criticism on social media and by prominent figures such as Nova Scotia's Premier Stephen McNeil. According to the Calgary Herald, other critics such as Saima Jamal, a Calgary-based social activist, considered the message a “slap to every immigrant” and an “insult” to all Canadians. Other critics focused on the substance of Mr. Smeenk's TNSFAC's message. For instance, Avnish Nanda, of Everyone's Canada, told the Calgary Herald that “[f]irst and foremost, it contains a lie. There’s no mass immigration to Canada. [...] There’s no threat of mass immigration. We think this is a dog whistle seeking to demonize immigrants and to divide Canadians around questions about migration and multiculturalism.”

Mr. Maxime Bernier mentioned that "[t]he billboards are not the product of the People's Party of Canada [...] They are authorized by a third party and the PPC has not been in contact with this third party." However, Mr. Smeenk, as CEO of KWG Resources, had been in contact with Mr. Bernier in the past. For instance, according to an interview given by Mr. Smeenk to CBC News, he invited Mr. Maxime Bernier, then Federal MP, and Mr. Doug Ford, leader of the Ontario Progressive Conservative Party, as "special guests" to a fundraising event scheduled for April 2018. The money obtained from the fundraiser would go "toward the research required for the partnership [i.e. the Ring of Fire Limited Partnership] to create its own transportation authority. The authority, similar to an airport or port authority, would help in transporting raw materials from the Ring of Fire to a proposed KWG processing plant in Sault Ste. Marie."

This is not the first time that Mr. Frank Smeenk is involved in controversy. Mr. Smeenk was criticized in the past for using a promotional video that featured "two women in bikini tops, crop tops and shorts extolling the virtues of the so-called Ring of Fire," according to a report by The Globe and Mail. "[S]ex sells," Mr. Smeenk was quoted saying in the interview with the newspaper.
