= Village Media =

Canadian media company

Village Media Inc.
- Headquarters: 298 Queen Street East; Sault Ste. Marie, ON; P6A 1Y7
- Website: villagemedia.ca

Village Media is a Canadian media company which operates a number of hyperlocal online news and community websites throughout Ontario.

Village Media's news sites focus on providing local stories written by local journalists in the communities that they serve. In addition to local news, the sites offer weather, events, obituaries, and a wide range of community information. Village Media is known for supporting local events and charitable causes.

The company also maintains content and marketing partnerships with community newspapers in several other Ontario cities, including TBNewswatch.com in Thunder Bay and Manitoulin.ca on Manitoulin Island. Village Media was also a partner with the defunct LocalXpress in Halifax, providing them with the publication platform.

== History ==
SooToday.com was originally launched in 2000 as a regional tabloid shopping and business directory, owned by former broadcaster Dick Peplow.

Following significant news cutbacks at MCTV, which merged all of the region's local television newscasts into a single regional program produced in Sudbury, SooToday began producing locally focused news content. In doing so, they became one of the first prominent Canadian ventures in hyperlocal web-only media. Peplow launched sister site BayToday.ca in 2003.

Following Peplow's death in 2007, local IT consultant Jeff Elgie, formerly a minority investor in the site, increased his ownership stake, and eventually became CEO.

Inspired by the SooToday.com model, a different company launched TimminsToday.com, which was acquired by Village Media in 2014.

The company's recent expansion efforts have concentrated on midsized cities in Southern Ontario, typically launching soon after the closure of the community's prior daily newspaper. It launched BarrieToday.com in October 2015 in Barrie, GuelphToday.com in February 2016 in Guelph, and OrilliaMatters.com in Orillia in 2018.

Village Media also operated HalifaxToday.ca in Halifax, OttawaMatters.com in Ottawa and KitchenerToday.com in Kitchener, in conjunction with Rogers Radio-owned news radio stations in those markets, although all have since been converted to the Rogers-owned CityNews brand.

In 2020, the company acquired the assets of Laurentian Media Group, including the Sudbury.com news website and the business magazine Northern Ontario Business. Village Media ceased publication of Laurentian's twice-weekly print newspaper Northern Life while retaining the Sudbury.com web edition.

In early 2021, the company expanded into the United States for the first time, with the acquisition of The Longmont Leader in Longmont, Colorado. The news website was shuttered in 2024.

In February 2023, the company launched The Trillium, an outlet that focuses on Ontario politics. They hired iPolitics's alumnus Jessica Smith Cross, the editor of publication and Charlie Pinkerton, a reporter, after they resigned over allegations that iPolitics suppressed on developers attending a stag and doe party for Ontario Premier Doug Ford's daughter's wedding. On May 4th 2026, it hired former CityNews reporter and Queens Park correspondent Tina Yazdani, who alleged that she was fired by Rogers media for her reporting.

The company formerly operated the video news portal local2.ca in Sault Ste. Marie, and the VM Radio network of internet radio streams. Local2 was fully integrated into SooToday. VM Radio was shut down.

In 2024 the company announced plans to launch Spaces, a localized social networking platform that will enable users to join customized groups to discuss topics of community interest, such as local sports and history.

In August 2026, the company announced a second attempt at a U.S. expansion, backed by funding from the Knight Foundation.

== Assets owned by Village Media ==
=== Ontario ===
- Aurora Today — Aurora
- Barrie Today — Barrie
- Bay Today — North Bay
- Bradford Today — Bradford
- Burlington Today — Burlington
- Cambridge Today — Cambridge
- Collingwood Today — Collingwood
- Elliot Lake Today — Elliot Lake
- Elora Fergus Today — Centre Wellington
- Flamborough Today — Flamborough
- Guelph Today — Guelph
- Halton Hills Today — Halton Hills
- Innisfil Today — Innisfil
- Midland Today — Midland
- Milton Today — Milton
- Newmarket Today — Newmarket
- Niagara on the Lake Local — Niagara-on-the-Lake
- Oakville News — Oakville
- Orillia Matters — Orillia
- Pelham Today — Pelham
- Soo Today — Sault Ste. Marie
- Stratford Today — Stratford
- Sudbury.com — Sudbury
- Thorold Today — Thorold
- Timmins Today — Timmins
- Toronto Today — Toronto

=== International ===
- Alimosho Today — Alimosho, Nigeria
- Soo Leader — Sault Ste. Marie, Michigan

=== Specialty publications ===
- Northern Ontario Business: Business news in the Northern Ontario region.
- The Trillium: Reportage on Ontario provincial politics.
- Village Report: National news portal comprising reportage from other Village Media titles and Canadian Press.
- Village Life: Lifestyle news.
