= Moon of the Crusted Snow =

2018 post-apocalyptic novel by Waubgeshig Rice

- Author: Waubgeshig Rice
- Language: English
- Genre: Post-apocalyptic fiction; thriller
- Set in: Canada
- Publisher: ECW Press
- Publication date: 2 Oct 2018
- Publication place: Canada
- Pages: 213 (paperback)
- Followed by: Moon of the Turning Leaves

Moon of the Crusted Snow is a 2018 post-apocalyptic thriller novel by Waubgeshig Rice. Set in a rural Anishinaabe community in northern Canada, it follows a group of community members after they are cut off from the rest of the world amidst a societal collapse. A sequel, Moon of the Turning Leaves, was published on October 10, 2023 by Random House Canada. Moon of the Crusted Snow was nominated for the 2019 John W. Campbell Memorial Award for Best Science Fiction Novel.

== Inspiration ==
Rice stated in an interview with the Toronto Star that he had always been intrigued by post-apocalyptic stories such as Lord of the Flies and The Chrysalids. After reading The Road, he wondered if he could put "an Indigenous lens" on that type of story.

Rice grew up in an Anishinaabe community not unlike the one depicted in Moon of the Crusted Snow. In an interview with CBC, Rice said that he "wanted the events in this story to slowly unfold" to reflect the distinction between the Anishinaabe community and urban Canadian cities.

== Process ==
Rice began writing Moon of the Crusted Snow in September 2015. He spent his mornings and weekends writing while working as a journalist. He took a two-week Indigenous writer's program at the Banff Centre for Arts and Creativity in Alberta, Canada that helped him focus on the novel.

== Plot ==
Evan Whitesky and his wife Nicole raise their two children on an Anishinaabe reserve in northern Ontario, Canada. The reserve loses power and all connection to the outside world, though the town's generators are able to power essential services through the winter. Two college students return from the south, bringing stories of societal collapse. A white man named Justin Scott arrives on the reserve, seeking shelter from the chaos. The chief and council allow him to stay, though they do not trust him.

The council institutes food and electricity rationing. Two young women freeze to death after drinking with Scott. Another group of white people arrive at the reserve begging for food, and Scott shoots one of them. As conditions deteriorate, Scott's influence increases and the band council's diminishes. There is a riot at the food handout line, and Scott suggests that he has found an alternative food source. A body goes missing from the morgue; Evan suspects Scott of cannibalism. He and other community leaders confront Scott, who is cooking the body into a stew. Scott is shot and killed; Evan is shot as well.

In an epilogue two years later, the power has never returned and the community is returning to their ancestral way of life; Evan has survived. They leave the reserve for a new settlement.

== Major themes ==
Alicia Elliott of the CBC writes that many non-Indigenous horror novelists use "old Indian burial grounds" as an explanation for why white protagonists are haunted. They may also use plot devices such as viruses wiping out entire populations, which have actually happened to Indigenous populations. In contrast, Moon of the Crusted Snow begins when the power goes out and the community is cut off from the wider world. At first, the community does not recognize the gravity of the situation, since their phone and Internet connections are frequently disrupted. As more community members die, the protagonist Evan notes that northern communities such as the one in the novel are "familiar with tragedy". According to Elliot, this serves as a magnification of "generations of intergenerational trauma and genocide."

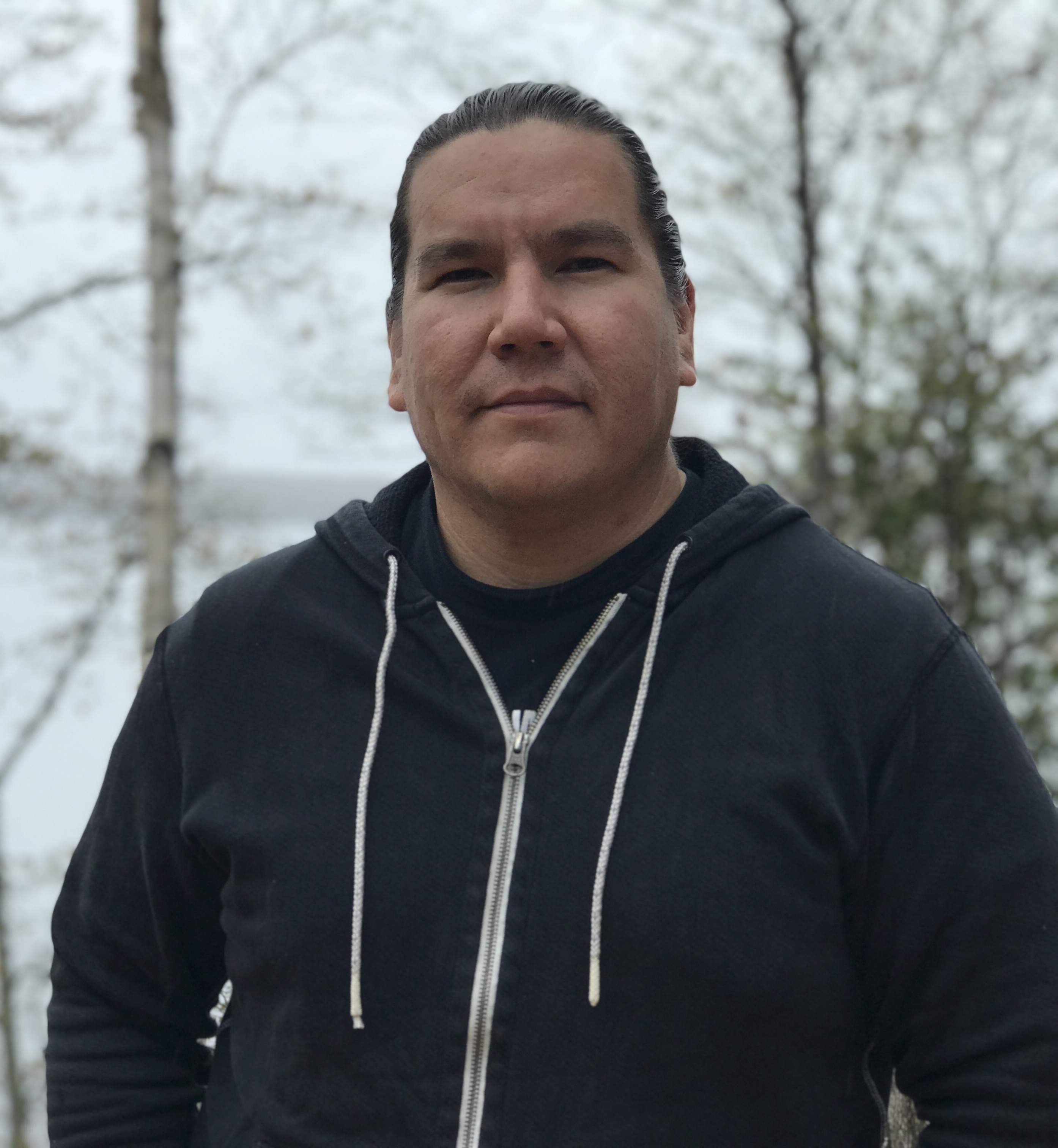
Waubgeshig Rice, author of Moon of the Crusted Snow

The Literary Review of Canada wrote that the novel explores a "doubled apocalypse": the fictional breakdown of society is contrasted to the real historical and cultural genocide against the Anishinaabe and other First Nations Peoples. Justin, a white man, eventually cannibalizes a Native American corpse, serving as a metaphor for cultural genocide.

In a review for Strange Horizons, Sean Guynes explored the concept of Anishinaabe "separation" from the "white world". Guynes wrote that the character of Scott and his appearance on the reservation underscored the band's separation from white Canada; Scott has a "fetish" for Indigenous women and misuses Anishinaabemowin words. The elder Aileen explains that the Anishinaabe were not originally an arctic people. They were driven from their ancestral lands by men similar to Scott. The band's reliance on white-owned convenience stores and white-owned power plants is a symptom of this earlier genocide. Additionally, Evan and Nicole have traditionally white names as a result of white influence on native names, language, and culture. Their children Maiingan and Nangohns have traditional Anishinaabemowin names, which indicates a return to a more traditional way of life.

== Style ==
The Anishinaabe language appears frequently in the novel. The words are sometimes defined and sometimes only understood through context. There is no glossary or pronunciation guide. This reflects an intentional choice by the author, who wanted readers to "do [work] on their own" as a "part of active learning." The title, Moon of the Crusted Snow, comes from the Anishnaabe phrase "Onaabenii Giizis." A reviewer for the Ripple Foundation said that "the author’s use of Indigenous words and phrases throughout the book add to its authenticity and cultural accuracy."

Rice uses jump cuts in which time passes without explicit description, similar to the works of James Joyce. He uses vivid imagery to describe the cold environment of winter in northern Canada.

Katharine Coldiron compared the novel's tight focus to the style of Alas, Babylon by Pat Frank. Both novels describe the "eye-level" view of people reacting to a disaster.

== Reception and awards ==
Moon of the Crusted Snow received praise from critics. Katharine Coldiron of Locus praised the novel's "slow, deliberate" prose, calling it a "humble but welcome addition" to the postapocalyptic genre. Publishers Weekly called the book a "powerful story of survival [that] will leave readers breathless." The Seattle Book Review gave the novel five out of five possible stars, calling it a "frighteningly plausible" story that "shouldn't be missed."

The book saw a resurgence in interest after the COVID-19 pandemic. When one Quebec couple traveled thousands of miles to the community of Old Crow, Yukon in an attempt to avoid COVID-19, many users on Twitter compared the story to a plot point from the novel.

In 2019, Moon of the Crusted Snow received the Evergreen Award, which invites people to read and vote on a selection of Canadian books curated by librarians. It was nominated for the 2019 John Campbell Award. In 2020, the novel was selected as Hamilton, Ontario's "must-read book" of the year.

In 2023, Moon of the Crusted Snow made the Canada Reads longlist.
