= Laurentian Media Group =

Former Canadian publishing group

Laurentian Media Group was a Canadian newspaper and magazine publishing company. Founded in 1973 by Michael Atkins, Laurentian published several titles in the Greater Sudbury, Ontario area, including the twice-weekly community newspaper Northern Life, the magazines Northern Ontario Business and Sudbury Living, and the trade publication Sudbury Mining Solutions Journal, as well as several national and international digital publications, including SCOREGolf and IT World Canada.

The company has also previously owned publications in other markets, including the Parry Sound North Star and the Parry Sound Beacon Star in Parry Sound.

In 2014, the company launched a content and business partnership with the Village Media network of internet media properties in other markets in the Northern Ontario region. In 2020, the two companies merged under the management of Village Media, with several of its key executives and staff taking new positions within the Village Media corporate structure.

== Publications ==
=== Northern Life ===
Northern Life was a community newspaper in Sudbury. The main office is located at 158 Elgin Street in Sudbury. The paper published twice a week, on Tuesday and Thursday. It formerly published three times a week, also putting out a Sunday edition, but in June 2006, the paper announced that it would be returning to twice-a-week publication in July, merging its Friday and Sunday editions into an expanded Friday paper which later became a Thursday paper. Northern Life celebrated its 40th anniversary in 2013.

On April 12, 2016, the paper's website northernlife.ca was relaunched as sudbury.com, although the print edition retained the Northern Life name.

On March 26, 2020, Northern Life published its final edition after 47 years.

The sudbury.com website is still in operation as a publication of the Village Media network.

=== Northern Ontario Business ===
Northern Ontario Business is a monthly trade magazine based in Sudbury, with monthly readership of 25,000, which covers business news and issues in Northern Ontario, and serves the region's business community.

=== Sudbury Mining Solutions Journal ===
Sudbury Mining Solutions Journal is a trade magazine covering news and business developments in Northeastern Ontario's mining industry.

=== Sudbury Living ===
Sudbury Living is a quarterly arts and lifestyle magazine, similar to Toronto Life. Sudbury Living has expanded to include three other publications called Sudbury Living Students, Sudbury Living Parents, and Sudbury Living Weddings. All three additional magazines are published annually.

== See also ==
- List of newspapers in Canada
