= Trojan Ballistics Suit of Armor =

Canadian protection suit

The Trojan Ballistics Suit of Armour is a protection suit designed by Troy Hurtubise for Canadian soldiers in Iraq and Afghanistan. Hurtubise claimed that it was "the first suit of its kind in the world, it is the first ballistics exoskeleton body suit of armour." Despite his efforts to promote the suit, the inventor experienced personal and financial hardship.

Hurtubise's death in a traffic collision in June 2018 was believed to have aborted any future research on the Trojan suit.

== Development ==
Troy Hurtubise spent two years and $150,000 developing the Trojan suit. When worn, the Trojan provided 97% coverage of the body and a claimed 95% flexibility. The suit also weighed 50 lbs maximum. He claimed that it could be suited to a soldier for CA$2000 if it were mass-produced. It was originally designed to stop Improvised Explosive Devices like the kind used in Iraq. However, he never actually tested the suit against a live IED.

The suit used a bullet-resistant foam of Hurtubise's own design to repel bullets and knives.

== Features ==
The Trojan Ballistics Suit of Armour's main weapons were dual pistols on magnetic holsters. There was a sheath on the wrist that contained a knife for close-quarter combat. The suit also contained a Pepper spray capsule for emergency situations. Hurtubise stated that this could be used to incapacitate 40 insurgents. This was supposedly made possible because his capsule would contain 3% oleoresin capsicum. However, it would be illegal to use in a combat situation, as capsicum is banned for use in war by the 1997 Chemical Weapons Convention.

The helmet utilized both an intake fan and an exhaust fan to keep the soldier who wore it from overheating in countries like Iraq and Afghanistan. It also included a perfectly centered laser targeting system to mark a target to be taken out by a sniper or assault vehicle. Hurtubise integrated a voice-activated radio into the helmet for easy communication. Two high-power lights were integrated into the side of the helmet. Hurtubise also included a voice-changing mechanism in the suit's helmet.

A compartment on the left arm contained a small vial of salt for the soldier, and the inventor stated that each Trojan suit would contain one dose of morphine. Also, a "last-words" recorder could be taken off of a soldier and given to the family of the soldier. A transponder chip was included that can be swallowed by a soldier so that he could be extracted. A light transponder on the chest could also be activated to signal a helicopter.

On the right leg was a small remote-controlled surveillance robot. The soldier watched the robot on a small fold-out screen on the left leg. A military time world clock was integrated into the groin protector that Hurtubise claimed was "where it's got to be." One of the shoes also had a small handheld shovel locked into it.

== Raffle ==
Hurtubise held a raffle for his Trojan suit to raise funds to continue development. But the winner, Sara Markis, agreed to let Troy keep the suit.

== Media coverage ==
The Trojan was featured on a Discovery channel special where he explained the features of his suit in detail.

== Similarities ==
The Trojan suit bore a striking resemblance to the MJOLNIR battle armours from the Halo video game series. Hurtubise confirmed this in an interview, saying, "I did look at Star Wars. I looked at Halo, the video game."

== See also ==
- Body armor
