= Project Grizzly (film) =

- Theatrical release poster
- Directed by: Peter Lynch
- Produced by: Michael Allder
- Starring: Troy Hurtubise
- Cinematography: Tony Wannamaker
- Edited by: Caroline Christie
- Music by: Anne Bourne; Ken Myhr
- Production company: National Film Board of Canada
- Distributed by: Reaction Releasing
- Release dates: September 1996 (Toronto International Film Festival); 1997 (Theatrical)
- Running time: 72 minutes
- Country: Canada
- Language: English
- Box office: Can$30 million

Project Grizzly is a 1996 documentary about Canadian inventor Troy Hurtubise. The film follows Hurtubise's obsession with researching the Canadian grizzly bear up close ever since surviving an early encounter with such a bear. The film was directed by Peter Lynch and produced by the National Film Board of Canada who approached Hurtubise after reading his 1990 book White Tape: An Authentic Behind the Scenes Look at Project Grizzly.

== Synopsis ==
After a dangerous but victimless encounter with a giant grizzly bear during a camping trip in 1984, North Bay, Ontario resident Troy Hurtubise is inspired to research the species up close. A scrap-metal merchant, Hurtubise builds a space suit-like "grizzly-proof" suit of armour inspired by the film RoboCop, which he calls "Ursus Mark VI". The inventor works diligently to improve the $150,000 suit, continuously testing its resilience by subjecting himself to would-be injuries from moving automobiles and bar brawls. He then forays into the Rockies to track down the grizzlies he dreams of meeting. Hurtubise ultimately leaves without repeating the bear encounter, which director Peter Lynch optimistically notes is the only way "the quest [can live] on."

== Production ==
Project Grizzly was filmed in Rocky Mountains of Alberta. To aid in the capture of the film's spontaneous moments, director Peter Lynch used compact Super 16 cameras, a format typically reserved for non-theatrical filmmaking. According to Lynch, the maintenance of believability and continuity was taken into consideration throughout the filming process.

== Release ==
Project Grizzly premiered at the Toronto International Film Festival in September 1996 where it was selected as "best of festival." The film was subsequently screened at other Canadian film festivals throughout the fall of 1996 before receiving a wider theatrical release throughout 1997. As of 2001, Project Grizzly has grossed Can$30 million.

The film was released on DVD on 11 October 2004.

== Reception ==
Rick Groen of The Globe and Mail awarded the film three stars out of four, describing it as "often hilarious", "occasionally touching", and "a curious source of national pride." Writing for the Ottawa Citizen, Noel Taylor rated the film three stars out of five, while Roger Levesque of the Edmonton Journal gave the film four stars out of four.

Filmmaker Quentin Tarantino called the film his favourite documentary of all time. While giving Hurtubise an honorary award, Harvard University described Project Grizzly as a "powerful and moving film."

=== Accolades ===
Project Grizzly was nominated for the Canadian Screen Award for Best Feature Length Documentary at the 17th Genie Awards on November 27, 1996, with director Peter Lynch as the recipient of the nomination.

== Aftermath ==
Following the release of the film, Hurtubise was awarded the 1998 Ig Nobel Prize for Safety Engineering by the scientific humor journal Annals of Improbable Research.

In 1998, following the theatrical success of the film, Hurtubise admitted to not liking the end result. "I told the NFB people we shouldn't go looking for grizzlies in October, so what we do? We go looking for grizzlies in October," he complained. He also criticizes the NFB for the humorous tone of the film which he claims failed to include much of his research, and says the five months he spent working on the film caused him to go bankrupt.

In 2001, Hurtubise took part in a controlled test with the help of an apprehensive bear handler in an undisclosed location to realize his dream of coming face-to-face with a grizzly bear once more. Wearing his Ursus Mark VI suit, Hurtubise stepped into a cage with both a grizzly and a larger kodiak. Neither bear attempted to attack him, leading him to conclude that a successful controlled attack would require a "bear suit that looks more human."

=== In popular culture ===
- Hurtubise's armored suit was parodied in The Simpsons episode "The Fat and the Furriest" when Homer is attacked by a bear, then constructs a bear attack-proof suit.
- The aforementioned suit was also referenced in the ninth episode of LoadingReadyRun's commodoreHUSTLE during which the comedy troupe constructs a mock version of the suit which they then use to attempt to meet a bear.
- In a deleted scene of Talladega Nights: The Ballad of Ricky Bobby during which Ricky is explaining to his mother how he had spent his day, Project Grizzly is playing in the background.
- A clip of Troy being hit by a log in his suit was featured in Friday Night with Jonathan Ross during an interview of Robert Downey Jr. in reference to the film Iron Man 2.
- The aforementioned clip of Troy being hit by a log in his suit was also used in Dinner for Schmucks as an example of a former idiot that had attended the dinner.
- The film is mentioned in Aesop Rock's song Bring Back Pluto: "I show up late looking project grizzly"
