= Margaret Elphinstone =

Scottish author (born 1948)

- Born: 1948 (age 77–78); Kent, England
- Education: Queen's College, London University; University of Durham
- Occupation: Author

Margaret Elphinstone (born 1948) is a Scottish author of novels, short stories and poetry. She is known especially for The Sea Road, a re-telling of the Viking exploration of the North Atlantic.

== Biography ==
Margaret Elphinstone was born in Kent, England. At one point she studied at Queen's College in London. She also graduated with a degree in English from Durham University. She was until recently, Professor of Writing in the Department of English Studies at the University of Strathclyde in Glasgow, now retired. Her academic research areas are Scottish writers and the literature of Scotland's offshore islands.

She did extensive study tours in Iceland, Greenland, Labrador and the United States. She lived for eight years in the Shetland Islands and is the mother of two children.

Before becoming professor in Glasgow in 2003, she worked at a variety of jobs in different locations. Some of her experiences were later used in her books:

- Islanders is based on her participation in archaeological excavations on the Shetland island of Papa Stour.
- Two garden books emerged after her work as a gardener in Galloway.
- Voyageurs arose after a one-year stay at Central Michigan University and canoeing adventures on the Ottawa River.

== Bibliography ==
- 1985 "Spinning the Green", short story
- 1987 The Incomer or Clachanpluck, novel. ISBN 0-7043-4070-4
- 1989 A Sparrow's Flight, novel. ISBN 0-7486-6025-9
- 1991 An Apple from a tree, short stories. ISBN 0-7043-4281-2
- 1994 Islanders, novel. ISBN 0-7486-6178-6
- 2000 The Sea Road, novel. (Ger 2001: Der Weg nach Vinland), based on the life of Gudrid of Iceland
- 2002 Hy Brasil, novel. (Ger 2004: Inselnotizen), based on the mythical island of Brasil
- 2003 Voyageurs, novel. (Ger 2006: Stromaufwärts)
- 2006 Light, novel. ISBN 978-1-84195-805-7
- 2009 The Gathering Night, novel. ISBN 978-1-84767-288-9
- 2024 Lost People, novel. ISBN 978-1-80432-317-5

...

== Prizes ==
- 1990 Scottish Arts Council Writer's Bursary
- 1991 Scottish Arts Council Travel Award

for The Sea Road

- 1993 Scottish Arts Council Writer's Bursary
- 1994 Scottish Arts Council Travel Award
- 2001 Scottish Arts Council Spring Book Award

for Hy Brasil

- 1997 Scottish Arts Council Writer's Bursary

for Voyageurs

- 2000 Scottish Arts Council Writer's Bursary

== Reviews ==
- Gladstone, Mary (1987), A New Promise, a review of The Incomer, in Cencrastus No. 28, Winter 87/88, pp. 14 & 15, ISSN 0264-0856
