= Voyageurs (novel) =

2003 novel by Margaret Elphinstone

- First edition
- Author: Margaret Elphinstone
- Language: English
- Set in: Northern Ontario
- Published: 2003
- Publisher: Canongate Books

Voyageurs is the title of the 2003 novel by Scottish writer Margaret Elphinstone. It sets a young Quaker farmer from rural England in search of his missing missionary sister; he must work as a voyageur to have any hope of finding her.
