= Manitoulin Expositor =

Canadian newspaper in Ontario

- Type: Weekly newspaper
- Owner(s): Manitoulin Publishing Company Ltd
- Founder(s): William Loe Smith
- Founded: 1879
- Headquarters: 1 Manitowaning Road Little Current, Ontario P0P 1K0
- Website: https://www.manitoulin.com/

The Manitoulin Expositor is a Canadian weekly newspaper, published in Little Current, Ontario to serve residents of Manitoulin Island.

== History ==
Launched in 1879 by editor William Loe Smith, it is the oldest still-extant newspaper in the Northern Ontario region.

The paper is nationally most noted for winning the Michener Award for public service journalism in 1982, for its investigation into the high local suicide rate. The investigation led to the launch of a community-operated suicide prevention hotline.

The paper was acquired in 1970 by Rick McCutcheon, who had joined the paper as an editor in 1968. He remains the paper's owner and publisher emeritus today, although he is semi-retired and day to day operations as editor and publisher are now handled by his daughter Alicia McCutcheon. In 2020, Rick McCutcheon was inducted into the Ontario Community Newspapers Association's Hall of Fame.

In 2001, the paper acquired the formerly competing Manitoulin West Recorder in Gore Bay. Both titles are still in operation as of 2020.
