= Waubgeshig Rice =

Canadian Anishinaabe writer and journalist

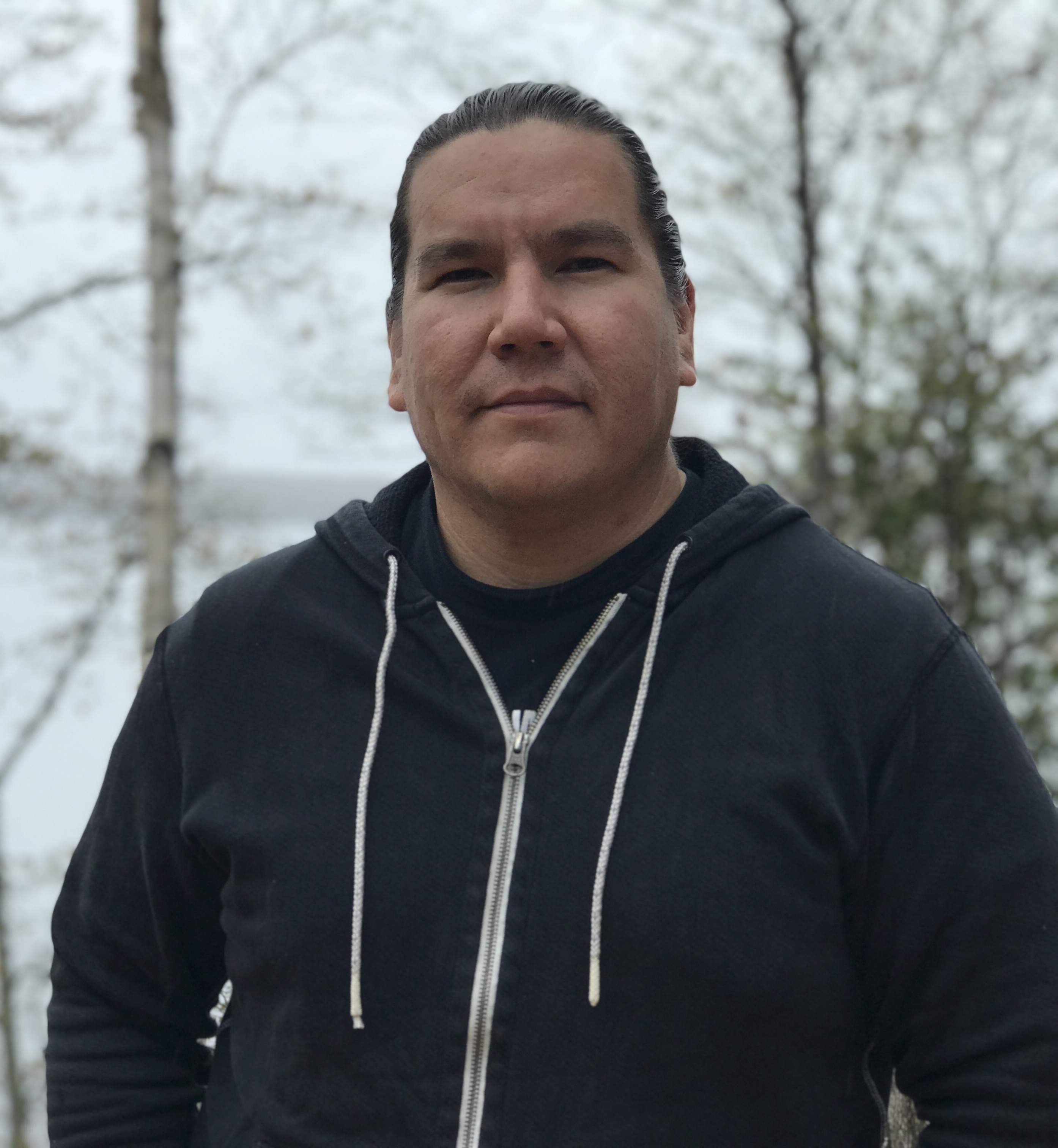
- Born: Toronto, ON
- Education: Ryerson University
- Occupations: Writer, journalist
- Website: Waubgeshig Rice

Waubgeshig Isaac Rice is an Anishinaabe writer and journalist from the Wasauksing First Nation near Parry Sound, Ontario. Rice has been recognized for his work throughout Canada, including an appearance at Wordfest's 2018 Indigenous Voices Showcase in Calgary.

== Career ==
=== Journalism ===
Waubgeshig Rice began his journalism career when he spent a year in Germany on a student exchange program and wrote a series of articles about his experience for the First Nations newspaper Anishinabek News. He graduated from Ryerson University in 2002, and began working as a freelance journalist for media outlets such as The Weather Network and Wasauksing's community radio station CHRZ-FM before joining the CBC's local news bureau in Winnipeg in 2006 and transferring to Ottawa in 2010.

With the CBC, Rice was a contributor to the radio and television documentary series ReVision Quest and 8th Fire. In 2014, he received the Debwewin Citation for Excellence in First Nations Storytelling from the Union of Ontario Indians. Rice became the new host of Up North, CBC Radio One's local afternoon show on CBC Sudbury, in 2018. He has also been on the national CBC Radio network as a guest host of Unreserved. Rice left the CBC in 2020 to concentrate on writing.

=== Writing ===
Rice published the short story collection Midnight Sweatlodge in 2011, as well as the novel Legacy in 2014, with Theytus Books. His second novel, Moon of the Crusted Snow, was published in October 2018 by ECW Press, and the audiobook was narrated by Billy Merasty and released in December 2018. The sequel, Moon of the Turning Leaves, was published in February 2024.

The New York Times named Rice, alongside Cherie Dimaline, Rebecca Roanhorse, Darcie Little Badger, and Stephen Graham Jones, as "some of the Indigenous novelists reshaping North American science fiction, horror and fantasy."

=== Podcast ===
In 2021, Rice launched the Storykeepers podcast with author Jennifer David, with assistance from an Ontario Arts Council grant. Rice and David discuss Indigenous literatures, "to bring conversations about Indigenous books to a wider audience in an audio book-club format." The podcast ran until 2023.

== Bibliography ==
=== Novels ===
- Legacy. (2014). Theytus Books. ISBN 1926886348.

==== Moon ====
- Moon of the Crusted Snow. (2018). ECW Press. ISBN 1770414002.
- Moon of the Turning Leaves. (2023). Random House Canada. ISBN 9780735281585.

=== Collections ===
- Midnight Sweatlodge. (2011). Theytus Books. ISBN 1926886143.

=== Nonfiction ===
- Drum making: A Guide for the Anishinaabe Hand Drum. Ed. Suzanne Methot. (2005). Ningwakwe Learning Press. ISBN 9781896832548.
- Laughter Is Good Medicine: Don Burnstick. (2009). Ningwakwe Learning Press. ISBN 9781897541074.

=== Short stories ===
- "Limbs" in Never Whistle At Night: An Indigenous Dark Fiction Anthology. Eds. Shane Hawk and Theodore C. Van Alst Jr. (2023). Penguin Random House. ISBN 9780593468463.

=== Other ===
- Brian D. McInnes. Sounding Thunder: The Stories of Francis Pegahmagabow. (2016). ISBN 0887558240. Foreword by Waubgeshig Rice.
- Ed. Warren Cariou, Katherena Vermette, Niigaan James Sinclair. Impact: Colonialism in Canada. (2017). Manitoba First Nations Education Resource Centre. ISBN 9781927849293. "Undercover" by Waubgeshig Rice.
- Le legs d'Eva: roman. Tr. Marie-Jo Gonny. (2017). Éditions David. ISBN 9782895976219. Translation of Legacy (2014).
- On Spirit Lake: Georgian Bay Stories. (2018). The Church Street Press. "Manido-gaming"by Waubgeshig Rice.
- Ed. Karen Schauber. The Group of Seven reimagined : contemporary stories inspired by historic Canadian paintings. (2019). ISBN 9781772032888. “The Stranger in the Cove” by Waubgeshig Rice.
- La cérémonie de guérison clandestine. Tr. Marie-Jo Gonny. (2019). Éditions David. ISBN 9782895976615. Translation of Midnight Sweatlodge (2011).
- Neige des lunes brisées. Tr. Yara El-Ghadban. (2022). Mémoires d'encrier. ISBN 978-2-89712-865-4. Translation of Moon of the Crusted Snow (2018).

== Awards ==
- Independent Publisher Book Award for Midnight Sweatlodge, 2012.
- Northern Lit Award for Midnight Sweatlodge, 2012.
- Debwewin Citation for Excellence in First Nation Storytelling, 2004.
