= Troy Hurtubise =

Canadian inventor and conservationist (1963–2018)

- Born: Troy James Hurtubise; November 23, 1963; Hamilton, Ontario, Canada
- Died: June 17, 2018 (aged 54); Ontario 17, North Bay, Ontario, Canada
- Other name: The Bear Man
- Education: Sir Sandford Fleming College
- Known for: Project Grizzly
- Notable work: Firepaste, Hurtzee, Ursus Series of Armour, Trojan Series of Armour, Godlight, Achilles, Vulkanite-H, L.I.M.B.C.
- Spouse: Lori Hurtubise
- Children: Brett Hurtubise
- Awards: Ig Nobel Prize

Troy James Hurtubise (November 23, 1963 – June 17, 2018) was a Canadian inventor, entrepreneur and conservationist, noted for creating the Ursus series of bear suits which showed the Ursus Mark VI in the 1996 film Project Grizzly directed by Peter Lynch for the National Film Board of Canada.

Hurtubise starred in the 1996 film Project Grizzly documenting his development of a series of protective suits that would allow for close-quarters bear research as well as testing of deterrent bear sprays. For his suit invention, he was awarded the satirical Ig Nobel Prize for Safety Engineering in 1998.

He also developed the Trojan Ballistics Suit of Armor, an exoskeleton suit intended for soldiers.

== Personal life ==
Born in Hamilton, Ontario, he moved to North Bay and later died in a vehicle collision west of there on June 17, 2018.

== Inventions ==
=== Ursus suit ===
Hurtubise built a metal suit for protection from grizzly bears; recorded as a National Film Board of Canada documentary and called Project Grizzly, in which Hurtubise tested the capabilities of the suit using himself as the test subject. Hurtubise discovered that bears wouldn't attack the suit. This resulted in his Ig Nobel Prize for Safety Engineering in 1998. The documentary focuses on version six of the suit ("Ursa Mark VI"), and also includes clips of the previous versions being tested.

=== Firepaste ===
Firepaste (see also Starlite) is an intumescent white paste that, when dry, is flame and heat resistant. It has a consistency and texture similar to clay when wet and dries into a gray ceramic material which resembles concrete. The impetus for firepaste came from a failed fire test with the Ursus Mark VII where the metal exoskeleton heated up, popped the air bags and left Hurtubise with numerous burns. Like Project Grizzly, Hurtubise has tested the material on himself. For a demonstration for the media and military in summer 2004, he made a thin mask of the material, put it over his face, and aimed a specialized blowtorch at thousands of degrees directly at the mask. The temperature was intentionally much hotter than the temperatures reached by the Space Shuttle on reentry. A thermometer located between his face and the mask measured no appreciable temperature change below the mask after nearly ten minutes, and the integrity of the material was not compromised.

=== Angel Light ===
According to Hurtubise, this device made walls, hands, stealth shielding, and other objects transparent. He claimed that beams from the device had the side-effects of damaging electronic devices and killing goldfish. After testing the device on his own hand, he claimed he could see his own blood vessels and muscle tissue as clearly as if the skin had been pulled back, but the beam caused numbness and he began to feel ill. He also claimed to be able to read the licence plate on a car in his garage from his workshop and see the road salt on it. Many experts have discounted Hurtubise's invention and accused him of quackery.

=== Trojan armor ===
In early 2007, Hurtubise made public his new protective suit which was designed to be worn by soldiers. Calling it the "Trojan Ballistics Suit of Armor", Hurtubise described it as the "first ballistic, full exoskeleton body suit of armour". He claimed that the 40-pound (18 kg) suit could withstand bullets fired from high powered weapons (including an elephant gun). Hurtubise published a demonstration video in which 9mm, .357 handgun rounds, and a 12 gauge shotgun round were fired at the suit's vest from short range; the apparently uncut video shows no marks at all on the ballistic clay underneath. The suit also features a knife holster and a helmet with two fans, one for intake and one for exhaust, to help cool the wearer.

The suit has many features including a solar powered air system, recording device, compartments for emergency morphine and salt, and a knife and gun holster. He estimates that the cost of each suit to be roughly $2,000 if mass-produced. It has been called the "Halo suit", after the fictional MJOLNIR battle armor worn by the Master Chief character in the Xbox and PC video game series Halo.

In early February 2010, after failing to receive any offers to buy the Trojan, Hurtubise, now bankrupt from the expense of creating the suit, was forced to put the prototype up for auction on eBay in the hopes that it would bring in enough money to sustain his family. The auction's reserve bid was not met. There was a raffle for the suit on the Mission Trojan website, whose goal is to raise money for further prototypes and testing of the Trojan Suit to demonstrate its abilities for military applications. The suit was won by Sara Markis of Florida who donated it back to Hurtubise for work on his next prototype.

== Death ==
On June 17, 2018, Hurtubise was travelling on Highway 17, west of North Bay, when his car collided with a transport truck carrying gasoline, sparking an explosion. The transport truck driver suffered minor injuries, but Hurtubise's body was discovered inside the burned passenger vehicle. Hurtubise left behind a wife and son.

== See also ==
- List of Ig Nobel Prize winners
